= 1805 in France =

- Decades: 1780s; 1790s; 1800s; 1810s; 1820s
- See also: History of France; Timeline of French history; List of years in France

Events from the year 1805 in France.

== Incumbents ==
- Emperor – Napoleon I

== Events ==
- 22 July - Battle of Cape Finisterre, British defeat of Franco-Spanish fleet.
- 8 October - Battle of Wertingen, French victory over Austrian forces, opening battle of the Ulm Campaign.
- 11 October - Battle of Haslach-Jungingen, French victory over Austrian forces.
- 14 October - Battle of Elchingen, French victory over Austria.
- 16–19 October - Battle of Ulm, decisive French victory culminating in the surrender of an entire Austrian army.
- 21 October - Battle of Trafalgar, decisive British victory over French and Spanish Navies.
- 23 October - On the early death of her husband, François, Madame Clicquot Ponsardin takes over his champagne house as Veuve Clicquot.
- 30 October - Battle of Caldiero, French victory over Austrian forces.
- 31 October - Sweden declares war on France.
- 3 November - Battle of Cape Ortegal, decisive British victory, the final action of the Trafalgar campaign.
- 5 November - Battle of Amstetten, French victory over forces of Austria and Russia.
- 11 November - Battle of Dürenstein, between French, Austrian and Russian forces had an inconclusive result.
- 16 November - Battle of Schöngrabern, French tactical victory.
- 2 December - Battle of Austerlitz, decisive French victory, effectively destroying the Third Coalition.
- 4 December - Truce signed between France and Austria.
- 26 December - Peace of Pressburg signed between France and Austria, as a consequence of the Austrian defeats by France.
- 31 December - The French Republican calendar is used for the last time, 8 days after being annulled by Napoleon with effect from 1 January 1806, the final official date being "9 Nivôse in Year XIV of the Revolution". This year also he has ordered his soldiers to be vaccinated.
- Pernod Fils founded in Pontarlier, Franche-Comté, by Henri-Louis Pernod and starts the production of the anise-flavored liquor known as absinthe.

== Births ==
- 15 January - Louise Bertin, composer (died 1877)
- 10 March - Auguste Joseph Alphonse Gratry, author and theologian (died 1872)
- 29 May - Paul Gallocher de Lagalisserie, engineer (died 1871)
- 3 June - Adolphe Dugléré, chef (died 1884)
- 13 June - Bénilde Romançon, saint (died 1862)
- 19 June - Mathieu-Richard-Auguste Henrion, magistrate, historian and journalist (died 1862)
- 28 June - Napoléon Coste, guitarist and composer (died 1883)
- 29 July - Alexis de Tocqueville, political thinker and historian (died 1859)
- 19 August - Jules Barthélemy-Saint-Hilaire, philosopher, journalist and statesman (died 1895)
- 24 August - Jean-Jacques Meyer, steam locomotive engineer (died 1877)
- 24 October - Jean-Baptiste Pallegoix, vicar apostolic of Eastern Siam (died 1862)
- 19 November - Ferdinand de Lesseps, developer of the Suez Canal (died 1894)
- 19 November - Édouard Drouyn de Lhuys, statesman and diplomat (died 1881)
- 16 December - Isidore Geoffroy Saint-Hilaire, zoologist (died 1861)
- 31 December - Marie d'Agoult, author, pen name Daniel Stern (died 1876)

== Deaths ==
- 17 January - Abraham Hyacinthe Anquetil-Duperron, orientalist (born 1731)
- 23 January - Claude Chappe, inventor (born 1763)
- 4 March - Jean-Baptiste Greuze, painter (born 1725)
- 18 March - Étienne Eustache Bruix, sailor (born 1759)
- 19 June - Louis-Jean-François Lagrenée, painter (born 1724)
- 2 October - Georges René Le Peley de Pléville admiral and Naval Minister (born 1726)
- 8 November - François-Thomas-Marie de Baculard d'Arnaud, writer and dramatist (born 1718)
- 24 November - Jacques Antoine Marie de Cazalès, orator and politician (born 1758)
- 1 December - Joseph Bernard de Chabert, sailor, geographer and astronomer (born 1724)

=== Full date unknown ===
- Gabrielle Gauchat, French memoir writer (born 1767)
- Pierre-François Hugues d'Hancarville, "baron" and art historian, in Italy (born 1719)
