= 1808 in France =

- Decades: 1780s; 1790s; 1800s; 1810s; 1820s
- See also: History of France; Timeline of French history; List of years in France

Events from the year 1808 in France.

== Incumbents ==
- Emperor – Napoleon I

== Events ==
- 22 January – The Bragança Portuguese Royal Family arrives in Brazil, having fled the French army.
- 2 February – French troops occupy Papal States (Vatican).
- February – Under the pretext of reinforcing the Franco-Spanish army occupying Portugal, French troops begin filing into Spain.
- 29 February – A French column, disguised as a convoy of wounded, takes Barcelona by convincing the authorities to open the city's gates.
- 23 March – Madrid is occupied by French forces.
- 2 May – Dos de Mayo Uprising, the people of Madrid rebel against the occupation of the city by French troops, provoking a brutal repression by the French.
- 5 May – Napoleon forces the Spanish royal family to abdicate and hands the throne to his brother Joseph.
- 25 May – Asturias rises up in arms, casting out its French governor.
- 17 April – Bayonne decree, ordering the seizure of American vessels in France.
- 4 June – Peninsular War: Battle of El Bruc, Spanish victory over French forces.
- 12 June – Peninsular War: Battle of Cabezón, decisive French victory over Spanish forces.
- 15 June – Peninsular War: Siege of Saragossa begins, as French forces repeatedly attack the city.
- 14 July – Peninsular War: Battle of Medina del Rio Seco, crushing defeat of Spanish army by the French.
- 18–22 July – Peninsular War: Battle of Bailén, Spanish forces surround the French and compel the surrender of almost 18,000 men. It was the worst disaster suffered by the French during the Iberian campaign.
- 30 July – Peninsular War: French forces massacre the population of Évora.
- 13 August – Peninsular War: Siege of Saragossa ends in defeat for the French who were forced to lift the siege and retreat.
- 17 August – Peninsular War: Battle of Roliça, British victory over the French, first battle fought by the British army during the war.
- 20 August – Peninsular War: Battle of Vimeiro, Anglo-Portuguese victory over French forces.
- 30 August – Peninsular War: Convention of Sintra signed, by which the defeated French are allowed to evacuate their troops from Portugal without further conflict.
- 27 September – Congress of Erfurt, between Emperor Napoleon and Tsar Alexander I of Russia begins.
- 14 October – Congress of Erfurt ends.
- 31 October – Peninsular War: Battle of Zornoza, indecisive battle between French and Spanish forces.
- 4 November – Napoleon creates the département of Tarn-et-Garonne.
- 5 November – Peninsular War: Battle of Valmaseda, Spanish victory over French forces.
- 7 November – Peninsular War: Battle of Burgos, French victory over Spanish forces.
- 10–11 November – Peninsular War: Battle of Espinosa, French victory over Spanish forces.
- 23 November – Peninsular War: Battle of Tudela, French victory over Spanish forces.
- 30 November – Peninsular War: Battle of Somosierra, outnumbered Spanish force fails to prevent Napoleon from moving on Madrid.
- 1 December – Peninsular War: French patrols reach the outskirts of Madrid.
- 4 December – Peninsular War: Madrid surrenders and French enter the city for the second time that year.
- 21 December – Peninsular War: Battle of Sahagún, British victory over French forces.

== Births ==
=== January to June ===
- 4 February – Charles-Pierre Denonvilliers, surgeon (died 1872)
- 26 February – Honoré Daumier, printmaker, caricaturist, painter and sculptor (died 1879)
- 20 March – Antoine Étex, sculptor, painter and architect (died 1888)
- 20 April – Napoleon III, first President of the French Republic and the only emperor of the Second French Empire (died 1873)
- 15 May – Marie Dominique Bouix, Jesuit canon lawyer (died 1870)
- 22 May – Gérard de Nerval, poet, essayist and translator (died 1855)
- 30 May – Felix-Joseph Barbelin, Jesuit influential in the development of the Catholic community in Philadelphia (died 1869)
- 8 June – Etienne-Paulin Gagne, poet, essayist, lawyer, politician, inventor, and eccentric (died 1876)
- 13 June – Patrice de Mac-Mahon, duc de Magenta, general and politician, first president of the Third Republic (died 1893)

=== July to December ===
- 5 July – Jacques Claude Demogeot, man of letters (died 1894)
- 30 August – Jean-Charles Chenu, physician and naturalist (died 1879)
- 28 September – Jean Pierre Pellissier, missionary to Southern Africa (died 1867)
- 2 November – Jules Amédée Barbey d'Aurevilly, novelist and short story writer (died 1889)

== Deaths ==
- 1 April – Jean-Baptiste Dubois de Jancigny, French agronomist and scientist (born 1753)
- 26 April – Jean-Baptiste Pillement, painter and designer (born 1728)
- 30 May – Louis-Charles, Count of Beaujolais, younger brother of King Louis-Philippe I of the French (born 1779)
- 10 June – Jean-Baptiste de Belloy, Archbishop of Paris and Cardinal (born 1709)
- 17 June – Louis-Joseph de Laval-Montmorency, Cardinal (born 1724)
- 23 July – François-Hippolyte Barthélémon, composer and violinist (born 1741)
- 6 September – Louis-Pierre Anquetil, historian (born 1723)
