= 1894 in France =

- Decades: 1870s; 1880s; 1890s; 1900s; 1910s
- See also: History of France; Timeline of French history; List of years in France

Events from the year 1894 in France.

== Incumbents ==
- President: Marie François Sadi Carnot (until 26 June), Jean Casimir-Perier (starting 26 June)
- President of the Council of Ministers: Jean Casimir-Perier (until 30 May), Charles Dupuy (starting 30 May)

== Events ==
- 4 January – Franco-Russian Alliance: A military alliance is established between France and the Russian Empire, pledged to remain so as long as the Triple Alliance (1882) exists.
- 12 February – Ère des attentats: Café Terminus attack – In one of the first acts of modern terrorism, anarchist Émile Henry throws a bomb into the Café Terminus in Paris, killing one person and injuring at least seventeen.
- 15 February (04:51 GMT) – French anarchist Martial Bourdin attempts to destroy the Royal Observatory, London, England with a bomb.
- 22 June – Dahomey becomes a French colony.
- 23 June – International Olympic Committee is founded at the Sorbonne, Paris, at the initiative of Baron Pierre de Coubertin.
- 24 June – Assassination of Marie François Sadi Carnot, President of France.
- 15 August – Sante Geronimo Caserio is executed for the assassination of Marie François Sadi Carnot.
- 15 October – Alfred Dreyfus is arrested for spying: Dreyfus affair begins.
- 5 November – Crédit Agricole established.
- 7 November – The Masonic Grand Lodge de France is founded, splitting from the larger and older Grand Orient de France.
- 19 December – Trial and conviction of Alfred Dreyfus begins at the Cherche-Midi prison and lasts four days.
- 22 December – Alfred Dreyfus is convicted of treason.
- 31 December – Dreyfus' appeal to the military court of revision — a formality — is rejected.
- Venus of Brassempouy is discovered.
- Émile Delahaye produces the first Delahaye automobile in Tours.
- Paul Cézanne paints Rideau, Cruchon et Compotier.

== Literature ==
- Camille Flammarion - Omega: The Last Days of the World
- Anatole France - Le Lys rouge
- Jules Renard - Poil de carotte
- Jules Verne - Mirifiques Aventures de Maître Antifer

== Music ==
- Claude Debussy
  - Prélude à l'après-midi d'un faune
  - Proses lyriques
- Gabriel Fauré
  - Hymne à Apollon
  - La Bonne Chanson
  - Nocturne No. 6
  - 2 Motets, Op. 65
- Vincent d'Indy - Prélude et Petit Canon, Op. 38
- Jules Massenet
  - Thaïs
  - La Navarraise
- Camille Saint-Saëns
  - 3 Preludes and Fugues, Op. 99
  - Thème varié

== Births ==
=== January to June ===
- 12 January – Georges Carpentier, boxer (died 1975)
- 18 January – Romain Bellenger, cyclist (died 1981)
- 6 February – André Marchal, organist and organ teacher (died 1980)
- 14 March – Marie-Simone Capony, teacher, fifth-oldest person in the world (died 2007)
- 26 March – Albert Achard, World War I flying ace (died 1972)
- 9 April – Jean Gounot, gymnast and Olympic medallist (died 1978)
- 23 April – Georges Renavent, actor (died 1969)
- 10 May – Paul Dujardin, water polo player and Olympic medallist (died 1959)
- 27 May – Louis-Ferdinand Céline, writer (died 1961)
- 2 June – Jean Gachet, boxer and Olympic medallist (died 1968)
- 13 June – Jacques Henri Lartigue, photographer and painter (died 1986)

=== July to September ===
- 25 July – Yvonne Printemps, singer and actress (died 1977)
- 19 August – André Lefèbvre, automobile engineer (died 1963)
- 27 August – André Lurçat, architect (died 1970)
- 3 September
  - Marie Dubas, music-hall singer and comedian (died 1972)
  - André Hébuterne, painter (died 1992)
- 8 September – Andrée Vaurabourg, pianist and teacher (died 1980)
- 14 September – Pierre-Marie Théas, Bishop (died 1977)
- 15 September – Jean Renoir, film director (died 1979)

=== October to December ===
- 17 October – Félix Amiot, aircraft constructor (died 1974)
- 25 October – Claude Cahun, photographer and writer (died 1954)
- 30 October – Jean Rostand, biologist and philosopher (died 1977)
- 4 November – Gabriel Auphan, Admiral (died 1982)
- 5 November – René Laforgue, psychiatrist and psychoanalyst (died 1962)
- 7 December – Louis Béguet, rugby union player (died 1983)
- 19 December – Paul Baudouin, banker, politician and Minister (died 1964)
- 25 December – Maurice Floquet, France's oldest man on record (died 2006)

=== Full date unknown ===
- Marcel LaFosse, classical trumpeter (died 1969)
- Georges Miquelle, cellist (died 1977)

== Deaths ==
- 29 January – Armand Gautier, painter and lithographer (born 1825)
- 3 February – Edmond Frémy, chemist (born 1814)
- 6 February – Maria Deraismes, author and pioneer for women's rights (born 1828)
- 9 February – Maxime Du Camp, writer and photographer (born 1822)
- 14 February – Jacques-Léonard Maillet, sculptor (born 1823)
- 20 May – Philippe Édouard Foucaux, Tibetologist (born 1811)
- 25 June – Marie François Sadi Carnot, President of France (assassinated) (born 1837)
- 1 July – Jean-Joseph Carriès, sculptor, ceramist, and miniaturist (born 1855)
- 2 September – Pauline Duvernay, dancer (born 1813)
- 8 November – Louis Figuier, scientist and writer (born 1819)
- 7 December – Ferdinand de Lesseps, developer of the Suez Canal (born 1805)

=== Full date unknown ===
- Jacques Claude Demogeot, man of letters (born 1808)
