= 1795 in France =

- Decades: 1770s; 1780s; 1790s; 1800s; 1810s
- See also: History of France; Timeline of French history; List of years in France

Events from the year 1795 in the French First Republic.

== Incumbents ==
- The Committee of Public Safety (until 2 November)
- The National Convention (until 2 November)
- The French Directory (from 2 November)

== Events ==
=== January to June ===
- 16 January – France occupies Utrecht, Netherlands.
- 17 January – Revolution breaks out in Amsterdam.
- 18 January – William V, Prince of Orange, flees the Dutch Republic for exile at Kew.
- 19 January – The Batavian Republic is proclaimed in the Netherlands.
- 20 January – French troops enter Amsterdam.
- 21 January – Dutch fleet in IJsselmeer is captured by France.
- 29 January – Chouans attack the Republican held town of Guémené.
- 17 February – Peace made with Chouans after their defeat.
- 13–14 March – Battle of Genoa, British-Neapolitan victory over French fleet.
- 5 April – The Peace of Basel is signed, between France and Prussia.
- 7 April – France adopts the metre as the unit of length.
- 23 April – Sweden becomes the first monarchy to recognize the French Republic – Swedish ambassador introduced into the French Convention.
- 16 May – Treaty of The Hague signed between French Republic and the Batavian Republic ceding territory to France.
- 31 May – French Revolution: Revolutionary Tribunal suppressed.
- 7 June – Siege of Luxembourg ends with surrender of fortress by Austrian forces to the French.
- 8 June – Dauphin, would-be-Louis XVII dies. Louis XVIII becomes titular king of France (he becomes the actual king on 6 April 1814).
- 17 June – First Battle of Groix, British naval victory over France.
- 23 June – Battle of Groix, British naval victory over France.
- 26 June – Hostilities resume after Royalist émigré force lands at Carnac.

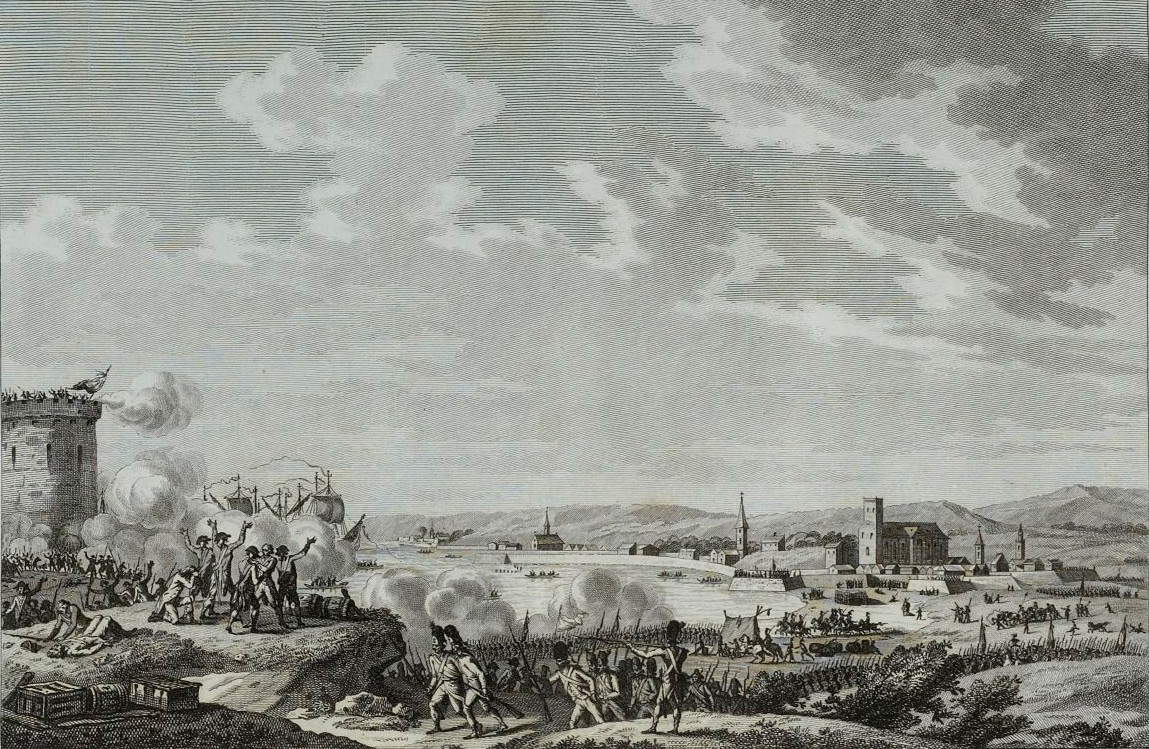
Victory of French Republicans in Quiberon on 21 July., (musée de la Révolution française).

- 27 June
  - French troops recapture St. Lucia.
  - British forces land off Quiberon, to aid the revolt in Brittany.
- 28 June – The French government announces that the heir to the French throne has died of illness (many doubt the statement).

=== July to December ===
- 13 July – Battle of the Hyères Islands, British–Neapolitan victory over French fleet.
- 15 July – The Marseillaise officially adopted as French national anthem.
- 21 July – Émigré force is defeated during the assault on Quiberon.
- 22 July – The Second Treaty of Basel is signed between the French First Republic and Spain, ending the War of the Pyrenees. Spain cedes its half of the Caribbean island of Hispaniola to France.
- 22 August – Constitution of the Year III enacted, establishing the Directory.
- 25 August – Battle of Trincomalee: British forces capture Trincomalee in Ceylon.
- 28 August - The Third Treaty of Basel is signed, between the French First Republic and the Landgraviate of Hesse-Kassel.
- 15 September -French Revolutionary Wars - Invasion of the Cape Colony: British forces capture Cape Town in the Dutch Cape Colony, to use its strategic facilities against the French Navy.
- 25 September - Royalist defeat at Saint-Cyr.
- 28 September – The Alliance of St Petersburg formed between Britain, Russia and Austria against France.
- 1 October - Austrian Netherlands annexed to the French Republic as the Belgian departments.
- 2 October – British forces capture Ile d'Yeu, off the coast of Brittany.
- 5 October – 13 Vendémiaire, battle between French Revolutionary troops and Royalist forces in the streets of Paris, resulting in defeat of Royalist insurrection.
- 29 October – Battle of Mainz, Austrian victory over French forces.
- 2 November – French Revolution: The French Directory takes power; the influence of the Sans-culottes declines.

=== Ongoing ===
- French Revolution
- French Revolutionary Wars
- War of the First Coalition

== Births ==
- 6 January – Anselme Payen, chemist (died 1878)
- 15 February – Charles Niellon, soldier (died 1871)
- 5 May – Pierre Louis Alphée Cazenave, dermatologist (died 1877)
- 10 July – Jean-Baptiste Guimet, industrial chemist (died 1871)
- 30 August – Amable Tastu (Sabine Casimire Amable Voïart), femme de lettres (died 1885)
- 6 September – Achille Baraguey d'Hilliers, Marshal of France and politician (died 1878)
- Full date unknown – Philippe Gustave le Doulcet, Comte de Pontécoulant, astronomer (died 1874)

== Deaths ==
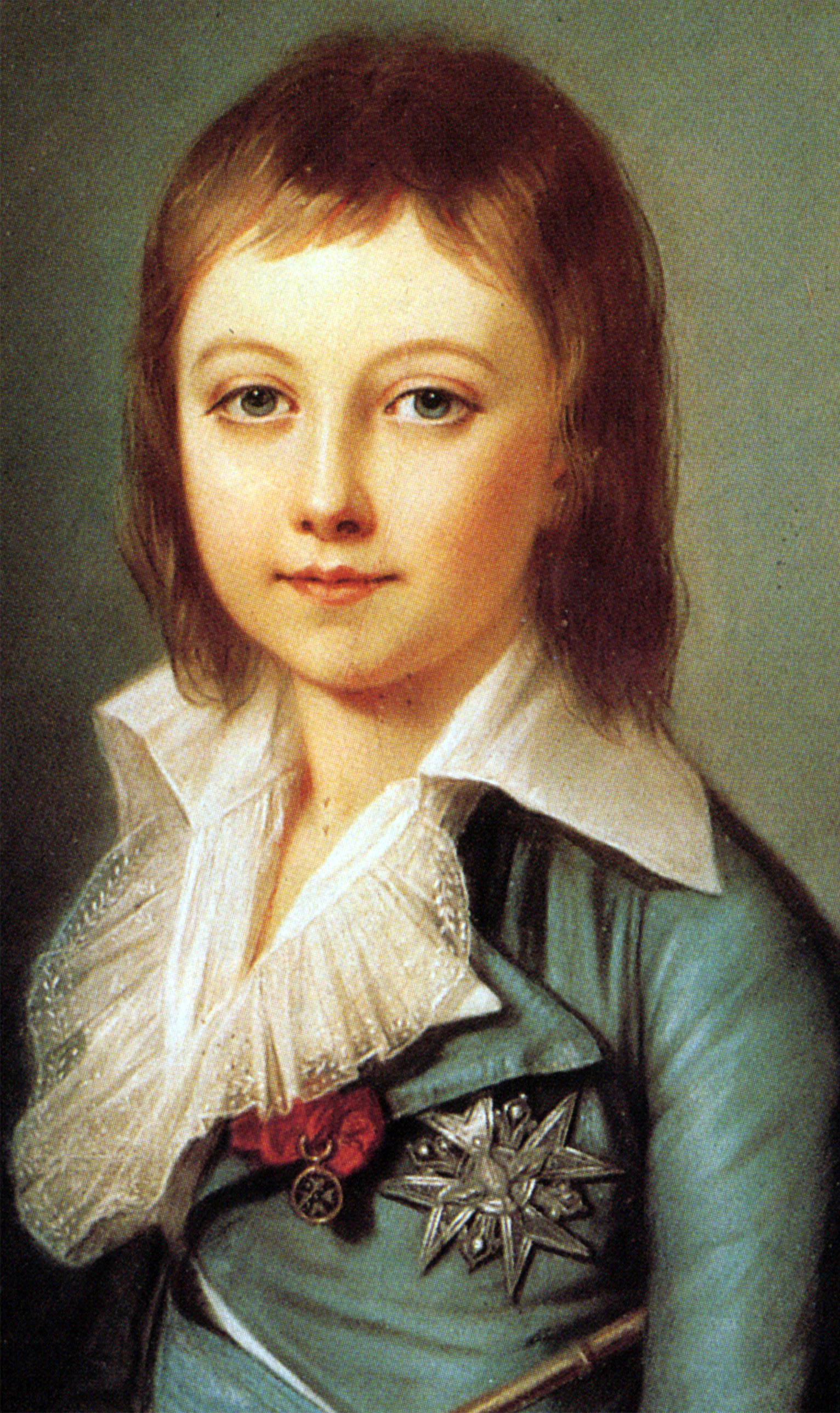
Louis XVII

- 30 April – Jean-Jacques Barthélemy, writer and numismatist (born 1716)
- 7 May – Antoine Quentin Fouquier-Tinville, lawyer and revolutionary leader (executed) (born 1746)
- 1 June – Pierre-Joseph Desault, anatomist and surgeon (born 1744)
- 8 June – Louis XVII, former dauphin and pretender King (born 1785)
- 17 June – Gilbert Romme, politician and mathematician (born 1750)
- 18 June – Marie Marguerite Bihéron, anatomist (born 1719)
- 3 July – Louis-Georges de Bréquigny, historian (born 1714)
- 27 July – Louis Grégoire Deschamps Destournelles, politician (born 1744)
- 31 August – François-André Danican Philidor, chess player and composer (born 1726)
- 15 November – Charles-Amédée-Philippe van Loo, painter (born 1719)
