= Arosa (surname) =

Arosa is a surname. Notable people with the surname include:

- Gustave Arosa (1818–1883), French art collector
- Marguerite Arosa (1852/4–1903), French painter
