= Panckoucke =

The Panckoucke family was a French family engaged in publishing and printing.

- Amélie Panckoucke (1750-1830), writer and salonnière, sister of Charles-Joseph;
- André Joseph Panckoucke (1703-1753), founder of the Panckoucke bookstore in Lille;
- Charles-Joseph Panckoucke (1736-1798), son of André Joseph, writer and publisher;
- Charles-Louis-Fleury Panckoucke (1780-1844), also writer and publisher, son of Charles-Joseph;
- Henry Panckoucke (1780-1812), directeur des Domaines in Rome, husband of Cécile Bochet painted by Ingres;
- Ernestine Panckoucke née Désormeaux (1784-1860), botanical illustrator of François-Pierre Chaumeton's "Flore médicale" (1818)
