= Henrion =

Henrion is a surname. Notable people with the surname include:

- Daphne Hardy Henrion (1917–2003), British sculptor
- Denis Henrion, French mathematician born at the end of the 16th century
- Henri Kay Henrion (1914–1990), German graphic designer
- Jean Henrion, former French figure skater
- John Henrion (born 1991), American professional ice hockey center
- Ludivine Henrion (born 1984), Belgian road bicycle racer
- Mathieu-Richard-Auguste Henrion (1805–1862), Baron, French magistrate, historian, and journalist
- Paul Henrion, (1819–1901), French composer
- Robert Henrion (1915–1997), Belgian fencer
- Pierre Paul Nicolas Henrion de Pansey (1742–1829), French jurist and politician
- Michael Robert Henrion Posner (born 1988), American singer-songwriter, poet, and record producer

== See also ==
- Henrion, Dassy & Heuschen double-barrel revolvers, type of revolver with two stacked barrels and two concentric sets of chambers, each serving its own barrel
- Henri
