= 1731 in France =

- Decades: 1710s; 1720s; 1730s; 1740s; 1750s
- See also: History of France; Timeline of French history; List of years in France

Events from the year 1731 in France.

== Incumbents ==
- Monarch – Louis XV

== Events ==
- 9 April – The Diocese of Dijon established

== Births ==
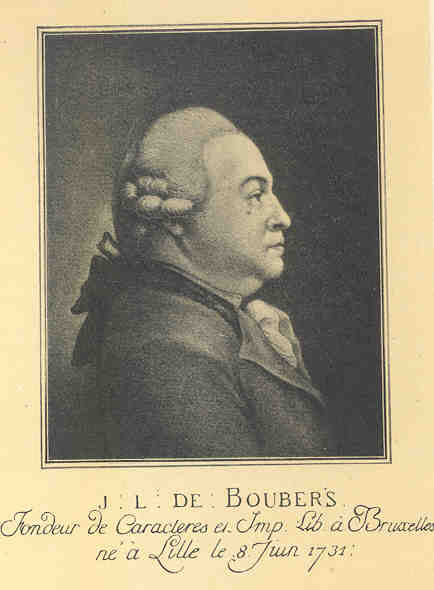
Jean-Louis de Boubers

- 18 June – Jean-Louis de Boubers, printer, publisher and bookseller (died 1804)
- 24 July – Louis Claude Cadet de Gassicourt, chemist (died 1799)
- 12 October – Jean-Baptiste Blanchard. Jesuit and educator (died 1797)

=== Full date unknown ===
- André-Charles Cailleau, book publisher (died 1798)

== Deaths ==
- 6 January – Étienne François Geoffroy, physician and chemist (born 1672)
- 21 February – Blaise Gisbert, Jesuit rhetorician (born 1657)
- 11 July – Jean-François Leriget de La Faye, diplomat (born 1674)
- 3 August – Charles Saint-Yves, ophthalmologist (born 1667)
- 26 December – Antoine Houdar de la Motte, author (born 1672)
