= André-Joseph Panckoucke =

French author and bookseller (1703–1753)

- Born: 31 January 1703; Lille (France)
- Died: 19 January 1753 (aged 49); Lille (France)
- Occupations: Author, printer and bookselle
- Known for: Publishing Voltaire

André-Joseph Panckoucke (31 January 1703 – 19 January 1753) was a French author and bookseller. He was the first of the Panckoucke family directly or indirectly involved in French publishing (Encyclopédie, Encyclopédie Méthodique, Le Moniteur Universel, Dalloz).

== Biography ==
André-Joseph Panckoucke, born in Lille, French Flanders, in France, was the son of Pierre Panckoucke and Marie Angélique Hennion.

Firstly trader haberdasher, he founded his bookshop on Place Rihour (fr), Lille, between 1728 and 1733.

On 12 February 1730, he married Marie-Marguerite Gandouin, the daughter of Pierre Gandouin (1672-1743), a Parisian scholar and bookseller whose bookshop was located at Quai des Grands-Augustins (fr) in Paris and named A la belle image. They had 15 children.

André-Joseph published several well-known works: in 1746 the periodical L'abeille flamande (a Flemish historical review stopped after 10 issues), in 1745 La bataille de Fontenoy (Battle of Fontenoy), in 1759 L'heureux citoyen, discours à M. J.J. Rousseau.

He was the father of Charles-Joseph Panckoucke and of Amélie Panckoucke, French writer and salonnière, wife of the journalist, translator and man of letters Jean-Baptiste-Antoine Suard. He was the father-in-law of the Brussels printer Jean-Louis de Boubers (fr).

He was Jansenist, opposed to the absolutism of royal power and admired Voltaire with whom he corresponded for a time. Died in Lille, he could not have been buried without orders from the Bishop of Tournai.

His widow took over the direction of the family business and developed the publishing catalogue. In 1759, she was prosecuted for publishing Voltaire Précis de l'Ecclésiaste en vers and her son Charles-Joseph Panckoucke was imprisoned for 6 months.

== Selected works ==
- Dictionnaire géographique de la châtellenie de Lille (1723),
- L'art de se désopiler la rate (1754),
- L'abrégé chronologique de l'histoire de Flandre contenant les traits remarquables de l'histoire des comtes de Flandre depuis Baudouin Ier dit Bras de fer, jusqu'à Charles II, roi d'Espagne (1762),
- Dictionnaire des proverbes françois et des façons de parler comiques (1748),
- Etudes convenables aux demoiselles contenant la grammaire, la poésie, la réthorique (1749).
