= 1862 in France =

- Decades: 1840s; 1850s; 1860s; 1870s; 1880s
- See also: History of France; Timeline of French history; List of years in France

Events from the year 1862 in France.

== Incumbents ==
- Monarch – Napoleon III

== Events ==
- 6 January - French, Spanish and British forces arrive in Veracruz, Mexico, beginning the French intervention in Mexico.
- 22 March - the vietnamese emperor Tu Duc suffers a heavy military defeat; French troops capture the provincial capital Vĩnh Long
- April - Tu Duc agrees to the Treaty of Saigon
- 5 June - This treaty is signed. It establishes the colony French Indochina
- 5 May - Battle of Puebla, victory for the Mexican Army against the French occupational forces.

== Arts and literature ==
- 3 April - The first two volumes of Les Misérables by Victor Hugo is published.
- 15 May - The remainder of Les Misérables is published.

== Births ==
- 28 March - Aristide Briand, statesman, Prime Minister and Nobel Peace Prize winner (died 1932)
- 6 April - Georges Darien, writer (died 1921)
- 22 August - Claude Debussy, composer (died 1918)
- 19 October - Auguste Lumière, filmmaker (died 1954)
- 7 December - Paul Adam, novelist (died 1920)
- 8 December - Georges Feydeau, playwright (died 1921)

== Deaths ==
- 11 January - Jean Philibert Damiron, philosopher (born 1794)
- 7 February - Prosper Ménière, scientist (born 1799)
- 11 February - Jules Lequier, philosopher (born 1814)
- 17 March - Fromental Halévy, composer (born 1799)
- 9 April - Charles Deval, ophthalmologist (born 1806)
- 18 June - Jean-Baptiste Pallegoix, vicar apostolic of Eastern Siam (born 1805)
- 5 July - Étienne-Denis Pasquier, statesman (born 1767)
- September - Mathieu-Richard-Auguste Henrion, magistrate, historian and journalist (born 1805)

=== Full date unknown ===
- Louis Alfred Becquerel, physicist and medical researcher (born 1814)
- Antoine Fauchery, photographer (born 1823)
- Louis Petitot, sculptor (born 1794)
