= 1722 in France =

- Decades: 1700s; 1710s; 1720s; 1730s; 1740s
- See also: History of France; Timeline of French history; List of years in France

Events from the year 1722 in France.

== Incumbents ==
- Monarch: Louis XV
- Regent: Philippe II, Duke of Orléans

== Events ==
- University of Burgundy established in Dijon.

== Births ==
- 19 February – Charles-François Tiphaigne de la Roche, author (died 1774)
- 7 March – Louis-Jacques Goussier, illustrator (died 1799)
- 23 March – Jean-Baptiste Chappe d'Auteroche, astronomer (died 1769)
- 23 May – Claudius Franciscus Gagnières des Granges, Jesuit (massacred 1792)
- 14 July – Jean-Pierre du Teil, general (died 1794)
- 23 July
  - Anne-Catherine de Ligniville, Madame Helvétius, salon holder (died 1800)
  - Antoine Petit, physician (died 1794)
- 11 November – Nicolas Antoine Boulanger, philosopher (died 1759)
- 22 November – Marc Antoine René de Voyer, ambassador and Minister of War (died 1787)
- 1 December – Jean-Pierre de Bougainville, writer (died 1763)
- 4 December – Guillaume Piguel, French-born Apostolic Vicar of Cochin (died 1771)

== Deaths ==
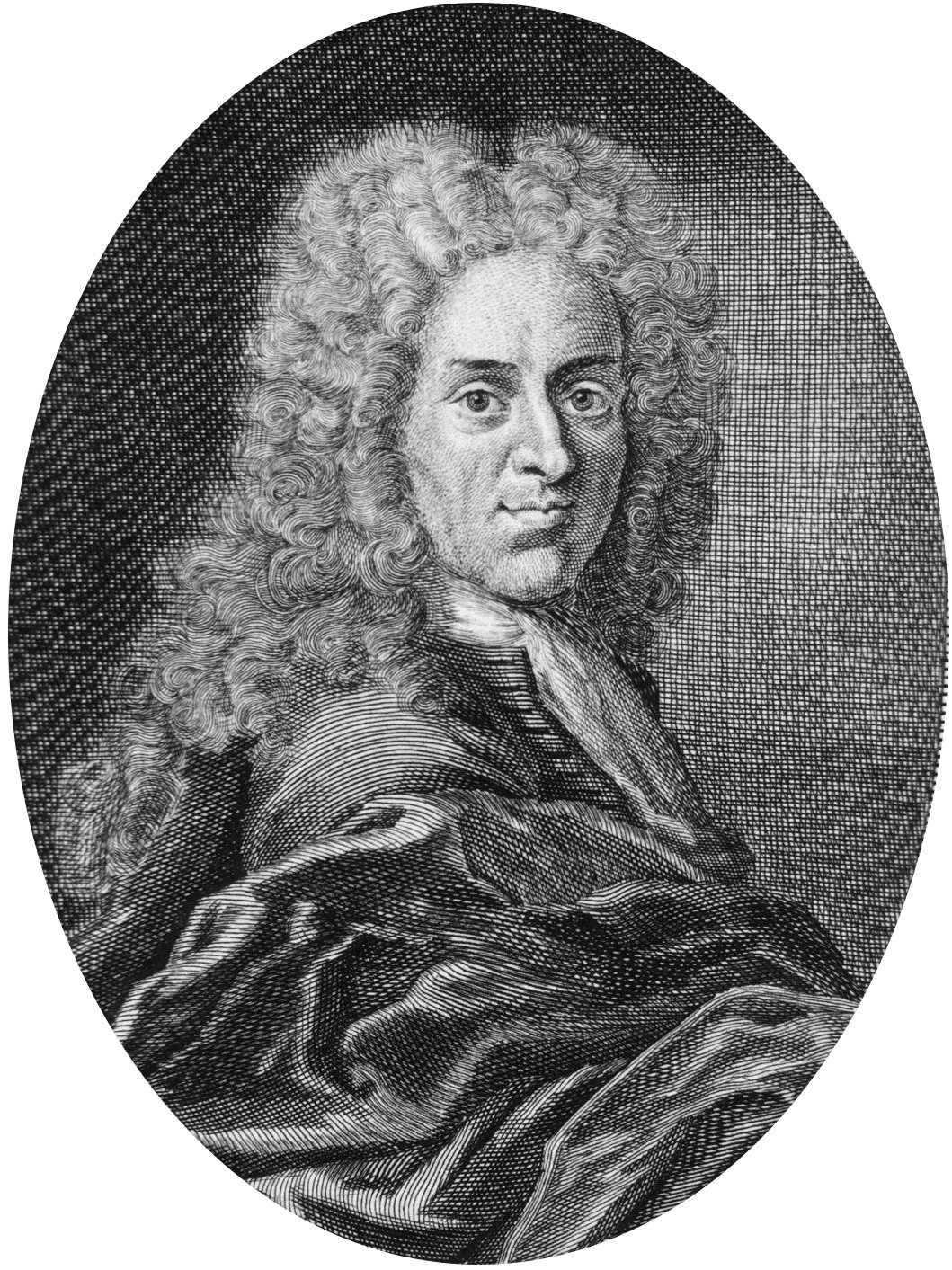
Sébastien Vaillant

- 23 January – Henri de Boulainvilliers, nobleman and historian (born 1658)
- 4 May – Claude Gillot, painter, engraver, book illustrator, metal worker and theatrical designer (born 1673)
- 20 May – Sébastien Vaillant, botanist (born 1669)
- 23 May – Pierre Aveline, engraver (born 1656)
- 26 September – Guillaume Massieu, clergyman (born 1665)

=== Full date unknown ===
- Charles de Ferriol, ambassador (born 1652)
