= Jean-Baptiste Dubois =

Jean-Baptiste Dubois may refer to:

- Jean-Baptiste Dubois (actor) (1762–1818?), French actor, comedian, dancer and singer
- Jean-Baptiste Dubois (cellist) (1870–1938), Belgian-born Canadian cellist, conductor, composer, and music educator
- Jean-Baptiste Dubois de Jancigny (1753–1808), French agronomist and scientist
- Jean-Baptiste Dubois, a 19th century bishop in the Archdiocese of Dijon

== See also ==
- Jean-Baptiste Dubos (1670–1742), French author, diplomat and art critic.
