= 1714 in France =

- Decades: 1690s; 1700s; 1710s; 1720s; 1730s
- See also: History of France; Timeline of French history; List of years in France

Events from the year 1714 in France.

== Incumbents ==
- Monarch – Louis XIV

== Events ==
- 7 March – The Treaty of Rastatt, between France and Austria
- 7 September – The Treaty of Baden between France and the Holy Roman Empire

== Births ==
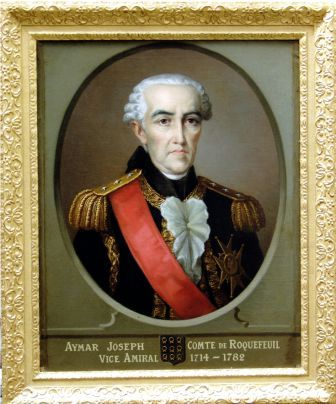
Aymar Joseph de Roquefeuil et du Bousquet.

- 22 February – Louis-Georges de Bréquigny, historian (died 1795).
- 6 March – Jean-Baptiste Marie Pierre, painter (died 1789)
- 19 March – Aymar Joseph de Roquefeuil et du Bousquet, naval officer (died 1782)
- 17 June – César-François Cassini de Thury, astronomer and cartographer (died 1784)
- 16 July – Marc René, marquis de Montalembert, military engineer (died 1800)
- 14 August – Claude Joseph Vernet, painter (died 1789)
- 27 November – Jean Philippe Goujon de Grondel, General (died 1807)

== Deaths ==
- 15 April – Jean-François de Chamillart, clergyman (born 1657)
- 28 April – Jean-Jacques Clérion, sculptor (born 1637)
- 11 May – Pierre Le Gros the Elder, sculptor (born 1629)
- 20 June – Marie Anne Mancini, duchesse de Bouillon (born 1649)
- 21 June – Paul du Ry, architect (born 1640)
- 17 August – Jules de Clérambault, ecclesiastic (born c.1660)
- 10 October – Pierre Le Pesant, sieur de Boisguilbert, lawmaker and Jansenist (born 1646)
- 11 October – Jacques de Tourreil, jurist, orator, translator and man of letters (born 1656)
- 25 October – Sébastien Leclerc, artist (born 1637)
- 13 November – Guillaume-Gabriel Nivers, organist and composer (born c.1632)
- 18 December – César d'Estrées, diplomat and Cardinal (born 1628)
- 30 December – François Adhémar de Monteil, Comte de Grignan, aristocrat (born 1632)

=== Full date unknown ===
- Philippe Grandjean, engraver (born 1666)
- Noel Aubert de Versé, advocate of religious toleration (born c.1642/5)
