= Un caprice =

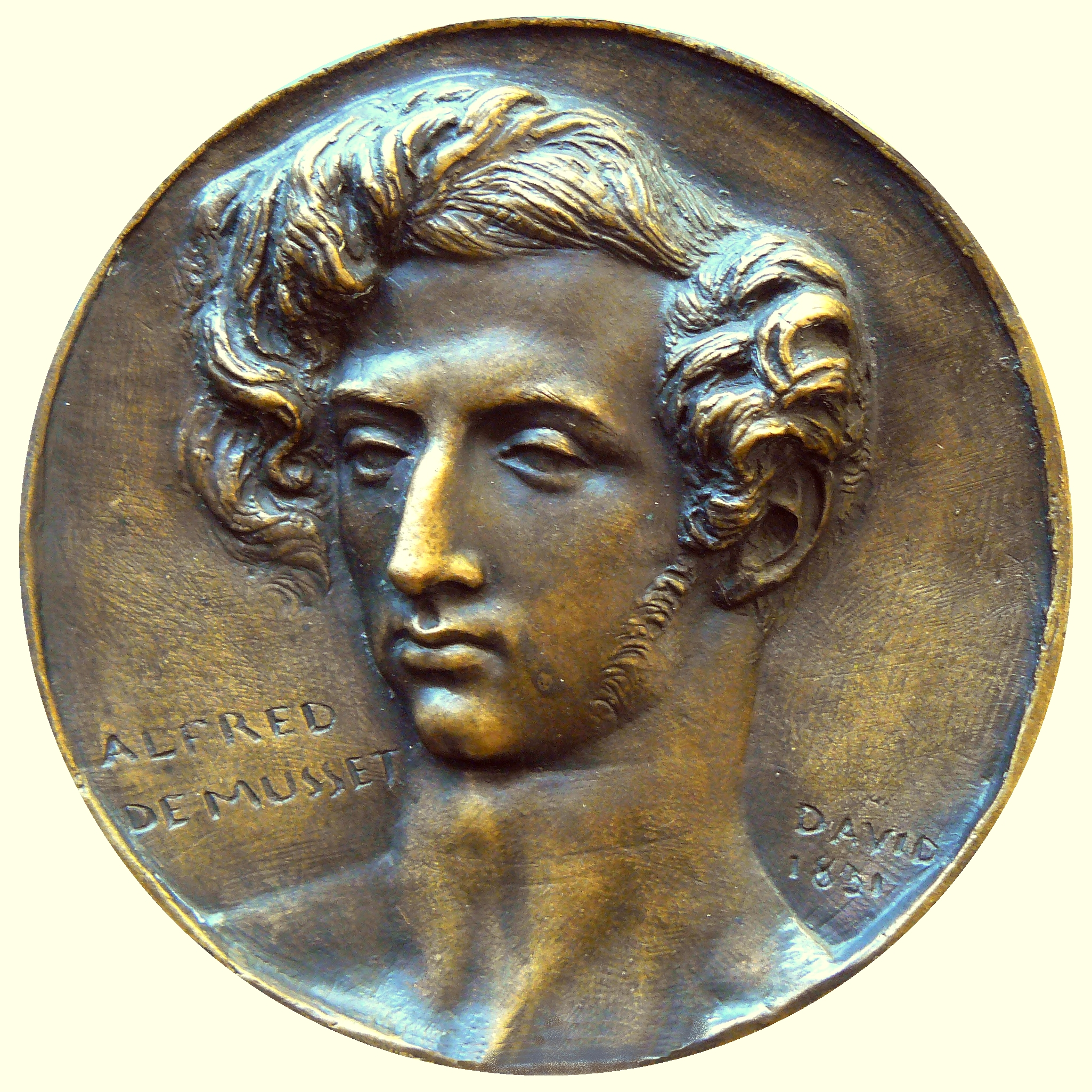
Portrait of Alfred de Musset

Un caprice is a play written in 1837 by Alfred de Musset and performed for the first time in 1843 at the French theatre in Saint Petersburg, the Mikhaylovsky Theatre, then in France at the Comédie-Française on 27 November 1847.

It was Mrs Allan-Despréaux who introduced the piece to the francophone Russian public, and played the role of Mrs de Léry, continuing it on the play's return to Paris in 1847. It was the first theatrical success for Alfred de Musset. Jules Janin praised the play in Le Journal des débats and Théophile Gautier stated in La Presse that the play was "a great literary achievement".

== Plot ==
The play deals with the story of Mathilde, a beautiful and innocent young girl married to a libertine, Mr. de Chavigny. One night when she makes a purse for her husband, she learns that he has bought one the day before. Mathilde and Mr. de Chavigny compete, then Mr. de Chavigny goes to a ball, and Madame de Lery comes to visit Mathilde. She then embarks on the difficult task of reconciling the spouses.

== Bibliography ==
- Ariane Charton, Alfred de Musset, Paris, Gallimard, coll. « Folio biographie », 2010
