= 1727 in France =

- Decades: 1700s; 1710s; 1720s; 1730s; 1740s
- See also: History of France; Timeline of French history; List of years in France

Events from the year 1727 in France.

== Incumbents ==
- Monarch: Louis XV

== Births ==
- 25 February – Armand-Louis Couperin, composer and keyboard player (d. 1789)
- 10 May – Anne Robert Jacques Turgot, statesman (d. 1781)
- 18 June – Charles-Augustin Vandermonde, physician, writer and editor (d. 1762)
- 14 August – Henriette-Anne of France (d. 1752) and Louise-Élisabeth of France (d. 1759), twin daughters of King Louis XV

== Deaths ==
- 4 August – Victor-Maurice, comte de Broglie, French general (b. 1647)
