= 1721 in France =

- Decades: 1700s; 1710s; 1720s; 1730s; 1740s
- See also: History of France; Timeline of French history; List of years in France

Events from the year 1721 in France.

== Incumbents ==
- Monarch: Louis XV
- Regent: Philip II of Orleans

== Births ==
- 19 October – Joseph de Guignes, French orientalist (d. 1800)
- 6 December – Guillaume-Chrétien de Lamoignon de Malesherbes, French statesman (d. 1794)
- 29 December – Marquise de Pompadour, mistress of King Louis XV (d. 1764)

== Deaths ==
- 14 April – Michel Chamillart, French statesman (b. 1652)
- 18 July – Antoine Watteau, French painter (b. 1684)
- 13 August – Jacques Lelong, French bibliographer (b. 1665)
- Henri Arnaud, French pastor and leader of the Waldenses (b. 1641)
