= Claude-François-Alexandre Houtteville =

French writer and churchman (1686–1742)

Claude François Alexandre Houtteville (1686, Paris – 9 November 1742, Paris) was a French churchman and religious writer.

Preceded by Guillaume Massieu	Seat 24 of the Académie française 1722–1742	Succeeded by Pierre Carlet de Chamblain de Marivaux
