= 1729 in France =

- Decades: 1700s; 1710s; 1720s; 1730s; 1740s
- See also: History of France; Timeline of French history; List of years in France

Events from the year 1729 in France.

== Incumbents ==
- Monarch – Louis XV

== Events ==
- 9 November – France signed The Treaty of Seville with Britain and Spain bringing an end to the Anglo-Spanish War started in 1727.

== Births ==
- 18 April – Gaétan Vestris, dancer (died 1808)
- 12 November – Louis Antoine de Bougainville, admiral and explorer (died 1811)
- 4 September – Dauphin Louis, Son of Louis XV (d. 1765)

=== Full date unknown ===
- Jean-Baptiste Marie de Piquet, Marquess of Méjanes, aristocrat and book collector (died 1786)

== Deaths ==
- 26 March – Simon de la Loubère, diplomat, mathematician and poet (born 1642)
- 27 June – Élisabeth Jacquet de La Guerre, French harpsichordist and composer (b. 1665)
- 18 October – Nicolas Ravot d'Ombreval, magistrate (born 1680)
- 1 December – Giacomo F. Maraldi, astronomer and mathematician (born 1665)
- 26 December – Honoré Tournély, Catholic theologian (born 1658)
