= 1717 in France =

- Decades: 1690s; 1700s; 1710s; 1720s; 1730s
- See also: History of France; Timeline of French history; List of years in France

Events from the year 1717 in France.

== Incumbents ==
- Monarch – Louis XV
- Regent: Philip II of Orleans

== Events ==
- 4 January (24 December 1716 OS) – Triple Alliance treaty between France, the Dutch Republic and Great Britain against Spain

== Arts and culture ==
- 27 March – Actress Adrienne Lecouvreur is invited to join the Comédie-Française in Paris, performing first in the title rôle of Prosper Jolyot de Crébillon's Electre
- 16 May – Voltaire is sentenced to eleven months in the Bastille and banished from Paris for criticizing the Duc D'Orléans; while in prison he writes his first play, Oedipe ("Oedipus")
- The last two volumes of Antoine Galland's Les mille et une nuits are published posthumously in Lyon of the first translation of One Thousand and One Nights into a European language, including the first translation of the story of Ali Baba

== Births ==
- 18 January – Jean-François-Marie de Surville, trader and navigator (died 1770)
- 8 May – Charles Guillaume Le Normant d'Étiolles, official, husband of Madame de Pompadour (died 1799)
- 20 June – Jacques Saly, sculptor (died 1776)
- 27 June – Louis Guillaume Lemonnier, botanist (died 1799)
- 13 August – Louis François, Prince of Conti, nobleman, military leader (died 1776)
- 15 August – Louis Carrogis Carmontelle, dramatist (died 1806)
- 5 October – Marie-Anne de Mailly-Nesle duchess de Châteauroux, mistress of King Louis XV (died 1744)
- 16 November – Jean le Rond d'Alembert, mathematician and encyclopædist (died 1783)
- 29 December – Charles Gravier, comte de Vergennes, statesman and diplomat (died 1785)

=== Full date unknown ===
- Claude Humbert Piarron de Chamousset, philanthropist (died 1773)

== Deaths ==
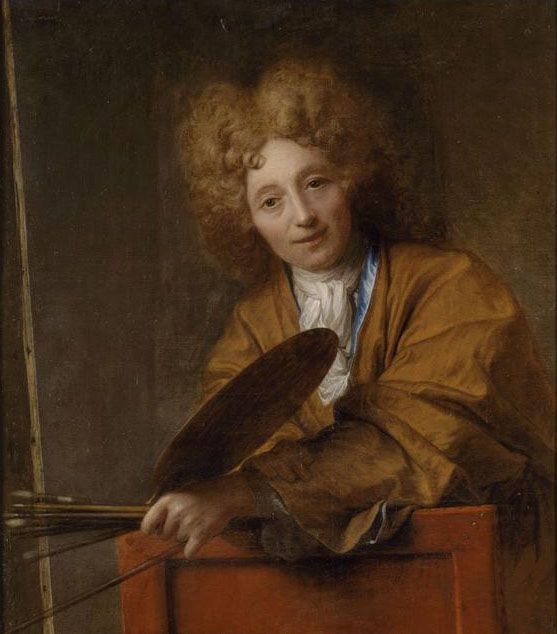
Jean-Baptiste Santerre, self-portrait

- 3 March – Pierre Allix, Protestant clergyman (born 1641)
- 5 March – François de Callières, diplomat, member of the Académie française (born 1645)
- 3 April – Jacques Ozanam, mathematician (born 1640)
- 5 April – Jean Jouvenet, painter (born 1644)
- 8 April – Antoine Benoist, painter and sculptor (born 1632)
- 17 May – Bon Boullogne, painter (born 1649)
- 9 June – Jeanne Guyon, mystic (born 1648)
- 11 June – Louis de Carrières, priest and Bible commentator (born 1662)
- 29 June – Augustin le Gardeur de Courtemanche, soldier and ambassador (born 1663)
- 13 August – Nicolas Perrot, explorer, fur trader and diplomat (born c.1644)
- September – Casimir Oudin, monk and librarian (born 1638)
- October – Philippe Pastour de Costebelle, naval officer and Governor of Newfoundland (born 1661)
- 21 November – Jean-Baptiste Santerre, painter (born 1658)
