= 1730 in France =

- Decades: 1710s; 1720s; 1730s; 1740s; 1750s
- See also: History of France; Timeline of French history; List of years in France

Events from the year 1730 in France.

== Incumbents ==
- Monarch: Louis XV

== Births ==
- 7 March – Baron de Breteuil, last prime minister of the French monarchy (d. 1807)
- 10 July - Jean-Baptiste Willermoz, French Freemason (d. 1824)
- 26 July – Charles Messier, French astronomer (d. 1817)

== Deaths ==
- 20 March – Adrienne Lecouvreur, French actress (b. 1692)
- 7 July – Olivier Levasseur, French pirate
- 18 July – François de Neufville, duc de Villeroi, French soldier (b. 1644)
- 15 October – Antoine Laumet de La Mothe, sieur de Cadillac, French explorer (b. 1658)
- 21 November – François de Troy, French portrait artist (b. 1645)
