= 1720 in France =

- Decades: 1700s; 1710s; 1720s; 1730s; 1740s
- See also: History of France; Timeline of French history; List of years in France

Events from the year 1720 in France.

== Incumbents ==
- Monarch: Louis XV
- Regent: Philip II of Orleans

== Events ==
- February 17 – Treaty of The Hague signed between Spain, Britain, France, Austria and the Dutch Republic, ending the War of the Quadruple Alliance.
- Outbreak of plague in Marseille; the bishop, Henri François Xavier de Belsunce de Castelmoron, wins approbation by remaining in his diocese.
- John Law abandons all his accumulated wealth and flees to Brussels amidst the collapse of the Mississippi Bubble.

== Births ==
- March 22 – Nicolas-Henri Jardin, French architect (d. 1799)
- November 1 – Toussaint-Guillaume Picquet de la Motte, French admiral (d. 1791)
- November 16 – Carlo Antonio Campioni, French-born composer (d. 1788)

== Deaths ==
- April 21 – Antoine Hamilton, French writer (b. 1646)
- June 27 – Guillaume Amfrye de Chaulieu, French poet (b. 1639)
- August 17 – Anne Lefèvre, French scholar (b. 1654)
- September 3 – Henri de Massue, Marquis de Ruvigny, 1st Viscount Galway, French soldier and diplomat (b. 1648)
- October 10 – Antoine Coysevox, French sculptor (b. 1640)
