= 1715 in France =

- Decades: 1690s; 1700s; 1710s; 1720s; 1730s
- See also: History of France; Timeline of French history; List of years in France

Events from the year 1715 in France.

== Incumbents ==
- Monarch – Louis XIV (until 1 September), then Louis XV
- Regent: Philippe II, Duke of Orleans (from 1 September)

== Events ==
- Persian embassy to Louis XIV

== Births ==
- 9 January – Robert-François Damiens, domestic servant, executed for the attempted assassination of Louis XV (died 1757)
- 12 January – Jacques Duphly, harpsichordist and composer (died 1789)
- 23 January – Jean-Olivier Briand, bishop of Quebec (died 1794)
- 30 January – Jean-Baptiste Lestiboudois, botanist (died 1804)
- 22 February – Charles-Nicolas Cochin, engraver (died 1790)
- 15 September – Jean-Baptiste Vaquette de Gribeauval, military officer, known for introducing the Gribeauval system (died 1789)

== Deaths ==
Louis XIV, King of France 1643-1715

- 8 January – Noël Bouton de Chamilly, military officer (born 1636)
- 29 January – Bernard Lamy, mathematician (born 1640)
- 20 May – Armand Jean de Vignerot du Plessis, sailor and nobleman (born 1629)
- 1 September – Louis XIV, King of France since 1643 (born 1638)
- 1 September – François Girardon, sculptor (born 1628)
