= 1716 in France =

- Decades: 1690s; 1700s; 1710s; 1720s; 1730s
- See also: History of France; Timeline of French history; List of years in France

Events from the year 1716 in France.

== Incumbents ==
- Monarch: Louis XV
- Regent: Philip II of Orleans

== Events ==
- May- John Law Scottish economist establishes Le Banque Générale in Paris.
- April – The Jacobite pretender to the British throne James Stuart is forced to leave France due to the terms of the Treaty of Utrecht. He takes up residence in the Papal exclave in Avignon and later moves to Italy.

== Births ==
- 20 January - Jean-Jacques Barthélemy, writer and numismatist (died 1795)
- 29 May - Louis-Jean-Marie Daubenton, naturalist (died 1800)
- 18 June - Joseph-Marie Vien, painter (died 1809)
- 16 December - Louis-Jules Mancini-Mazarini, Duc de Nivernais, diplomat and writer (died 1798)
- 26 December - Jean François de Saint-Lambert, poet (died 1803)

== Deaths ==
- 13 December - Charles de La Fosse, painter (born 1640)

=== Full date unknown ===
- Pierre-Marie-Jérôme Trésaguet, engineer (died 1796).
