= Beauséjour, Marne =

Former village in France, destroyed during WWI

Coordinates: 49°11′9″N 4°42′10″E

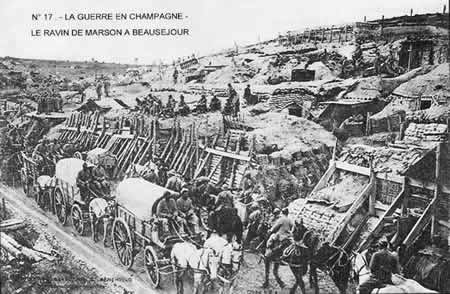
A fort in Marson Ravine, Boauséjour

Beauséjour is a former commune and was a village in France that was largely destroyed in World War I. Now it was part of the commune of Minaucourt-le-Mesnil-lès-Hurlus (Marne).

Founded in 1820, it was the scene of historic fighting between the Germans, French, and English in 1914 and 1915. It was not rebuilt after the war. Today it is the site of historic markers. The village received coverage in news articles years later, as France's oldest recorded man, Maurice Floquet, fought at the battle as a soldier and survived.
