= Château de Châteaurenard =

Ruined castle in Château-Renard in the Loiret département of France

Coordinates: 43.881°N 4.856°E

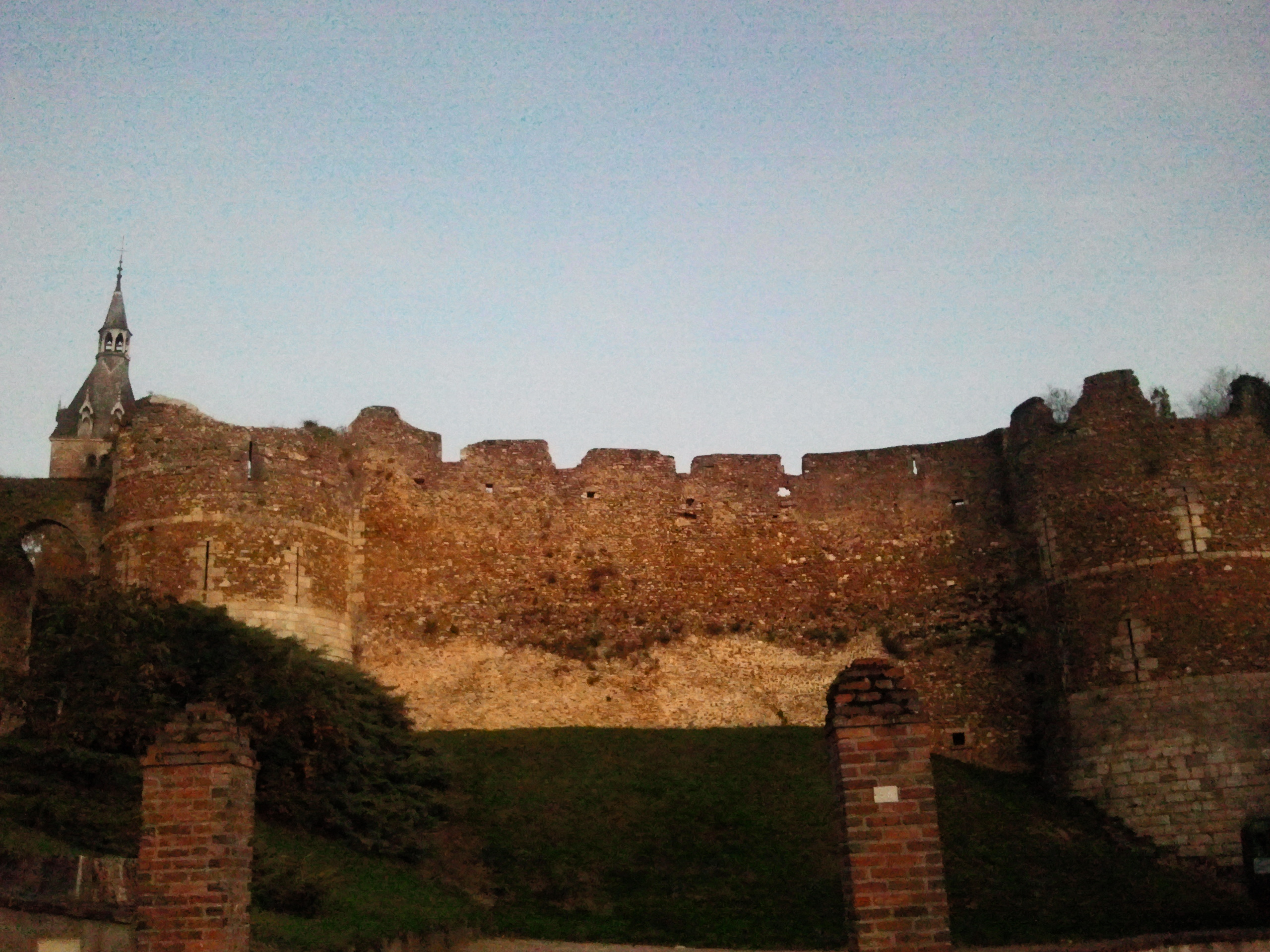
Ruins of the ramparts

The Château de Châteaurenard is a ruined castle in the commune of Château-Renard in the Loiret département of France.

== History ==
There have been three distinct castles on the site. The château de Renard, 961–1131, was situated within the upper part of the enceinte. The king, Louis VI, attacked and destroyed this castle in 1110 and again in 1131 when it seemed that it was secretly being rebuilt. Little trace of this is visible. During the next 100 years, the church inside the castle was rebuilt and a priory constructed. The second castle, château de Gaucher II de Châteaurenard, count de Joigny, built 1232–1241, provides the layout as seen today. The third castle or chastellet, 1570–1662, reused the upper part of the second castle.

In the 12th century, the property was owned by Milon de Courtenay, seigneur of Châteaurenard, Saint-Maurice and other places. His sons went to the Second Crusade with Louis VII. When the eldest son, Guillaume, was killed in Palestine in 1148, the second son, Renaud, rushed back to France to claim his inheritance.

In 1232, Gaucher II, a descendant of the original Renard, was given permission by Blanche de Castille, regent during the minority of Saint Louis, to rebuild the fortress. Gaucher was married to Amicie de Montfort, daughter of Simon de Montfort, 5th Earl of Leicester. The castle was completed in 1242 when Gaucher was crucified in the Holy Land. The result was a structure exhibiting the height of medieval military architecture. The castle has 16 towers connected by walls, including the Grant Tour, a massive keep. The current names of the towers date at least from the 14th century: anticlockwise from the main gate, these were tour de la Citerne, tour Ronde, tour Rouge, tour feu Louis de Girolles, tour de Perrichoy, tour de Gastelier (or du Chastellet), tour de la Fausse Porte, la Grant Tour, tour Clément, tour Sesneau, tour au Breton, an unnamed turret behind the priory, tour au Marichaut and tour au Portier.

The castle passed to the Coligny family in 1531. During the Wars of Religion, the castle was occupied by Protestants until 1568, when it was attacked and partially destroyed. However, Gaspard II de Coligny was restored to his rights in 1570, repaired the castle and built a second enceinte. These rights passed via Louise de Coligny to the children of her second husband, William of Orange, founder of the Netherlands. At the start of the 17th century, Orange installed Gédéon de Vaufin (or Waulfein) as governor in the castle with a small Protestant garrison. Vaufin forbade Catholics entry to the church. In May 1622, with Vaufin and some of his men lured away by an agent of Louis XIII the castle was occupied by townspeople. Louis XIII ordered the chastellet's destruction.

== Description ==
Most of the medieval castle is in ruins. It comprised a keep and sixteen towers and a six-metre moat. It had five doors, the most famous of which, the Porte Rouge (red door), is the current entrance. It was reached via a drawbridge across the moat and is so-called because hunting trophies were hung there. It is flanked by two dismantled round towers. Much of the structure has been stripped of its dressed stone for use in local buildings.

The property of the commune, it has been classified since 1911 as a monument historique by the French Ministry of Culture.

== See also ==
- List of castles in France
