= 1723 in France =

- Decades: 1700s; 1710s; 1720s; 1730s; 1740s
- See also: History of France; Timeline of French history; List of years in France

Events from the year 1723 in France.

== Incumbents ==
- Monarch – Louis XV
- Regent: Philippe II, Duke of Orléans (until 15 February)

== Events ==
- 15 February – King Louis XV attains his majority on his 13th birthday, bringing an end to the 7½-year Régence of his cousin Philippe II, Duke of Orléans.
- 22 March – 4 Protestant preachers are hanged at Montpellier.
- 10 August – Philippe II, Duke of Orléans, previously regent, is appointed by the King to serve as his chief minister, but dies in office less than four months later.

== Births ==
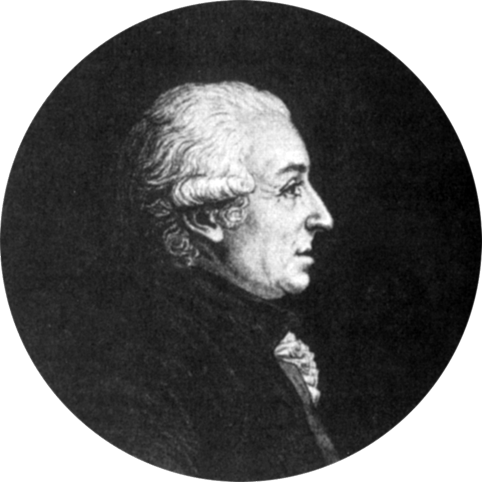
Mathurin Jacques Brisson

- 5 January – Nicole-Reine Lepaute, astronomer and mathematician (died 1788)
- 21 February – Louis-Pierre Anquetil, historian (died 1808)
- 30 April – Mathurin Jacques Brisson, zoologist (died 1806)
- 11 July – Jean-François Marmontel, historian, writer (died 1799)

== Deaths ==
- 13 March – René Auguste Constantin de Renneville, Protestant poet and historian (born 1650)
- 11 May – Jean Galbert de Campistron, dramatist (born 1656)
- 29 May – Jean de La Chapelle, novelist and playwright (born 1621)
- 10 August – Guillaume Dubois, cardinal and statesman (born 1656)
- 20 September – Félix Le Pelletier de La Houssaye, statesman (born 1663)
- 2 December – Philippe II, Duke of Orléans, chief minister, ex-regent (born 1674)

=== Full date unknown ===
- Charles d'Agar, painter (born 1669)
