= Marguerite Arosa =

French painter (1854–1903)

Marguerite Arosa (1852/4–1903) was a French portrait, landscape and genre painter and draughtswoman in 19th-century Paris. Marguerite Arosa is credited with teaching Paul Gauguin to paint. The two painted side by side in 1873.

== Life ==
Marguerite Arosa, the youngest daughter of the art collector Gustave Arosa, was born in Paris in 1852 or 1854. The family was of Spanish extraction. She studied under Mayer, Barrias and Armand-Gautier, and exhibited regularly at the Paris Salon between 1882 and 1900. She died in the 17th arrondissement of Paris on 23 February 1903.

Marguerite Arosa is credited with encouraging and teaching Paul Gauguin to paint. For a time, Gauguin lived in the household of Gustave Arosa. In 1873, Marguerite Arosa and Paul Gauguin painted side by side.

== Works ==
Among her words were coastal landscapes: Temps brumeux, in the Salon of 1891; La pêche à la Senne (Brittany), in the Salon of 1897; and Coin de port à marée basse, in the Salon of 1900. She also painted genre scenes: in the Salon of 1885 or 1886 she was represented with an Andromède standing chained to a rock, looking out to sea; and in the Brussels Salon of 1884 with a Baigneuse. The artist took part in the Exposition internationale de blanc et noir in 1892 with the watercolour Lilas en fleurs (Parc Monceau).

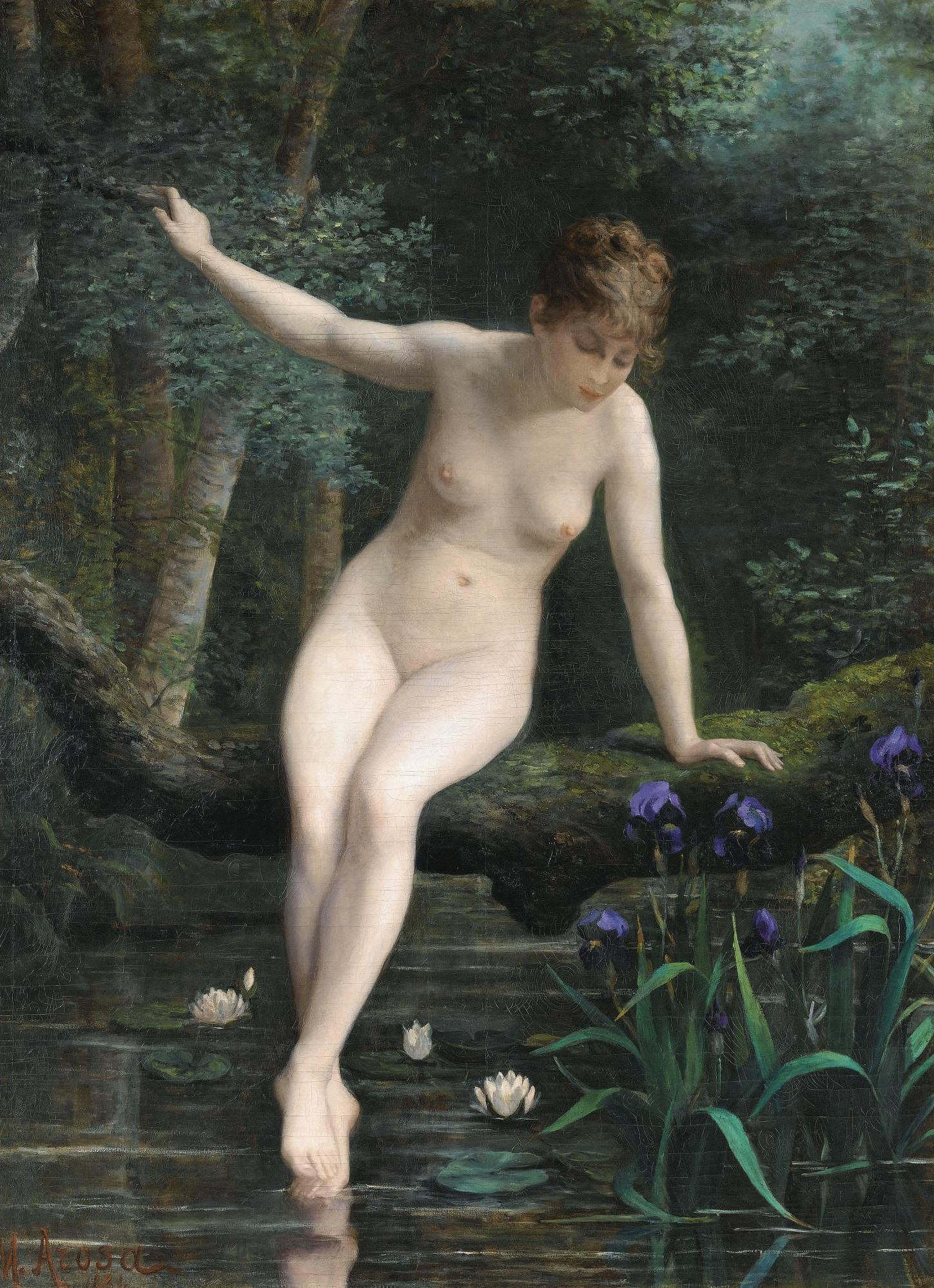
Baigneuse (1884)

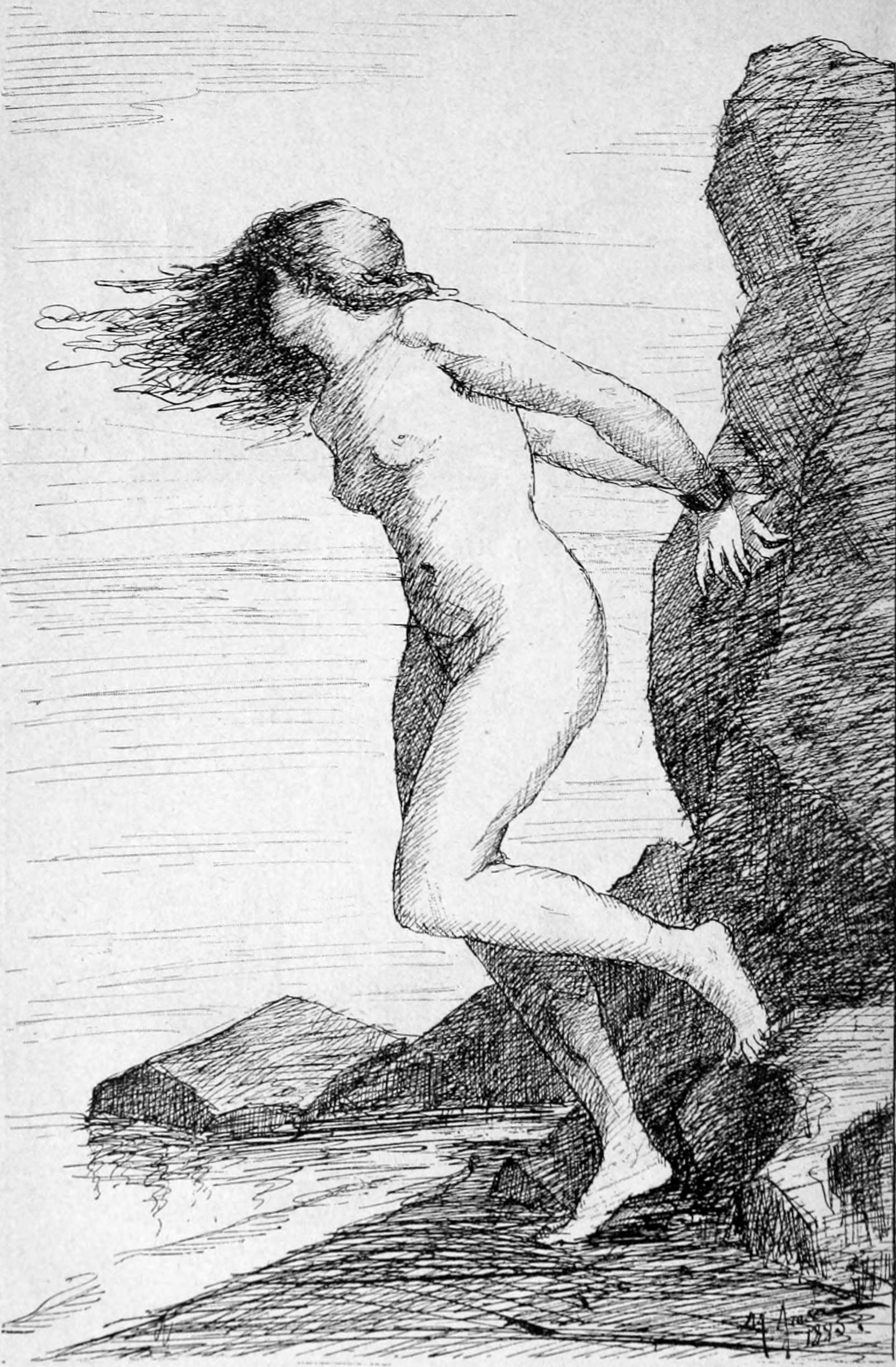
Andromède (1885)

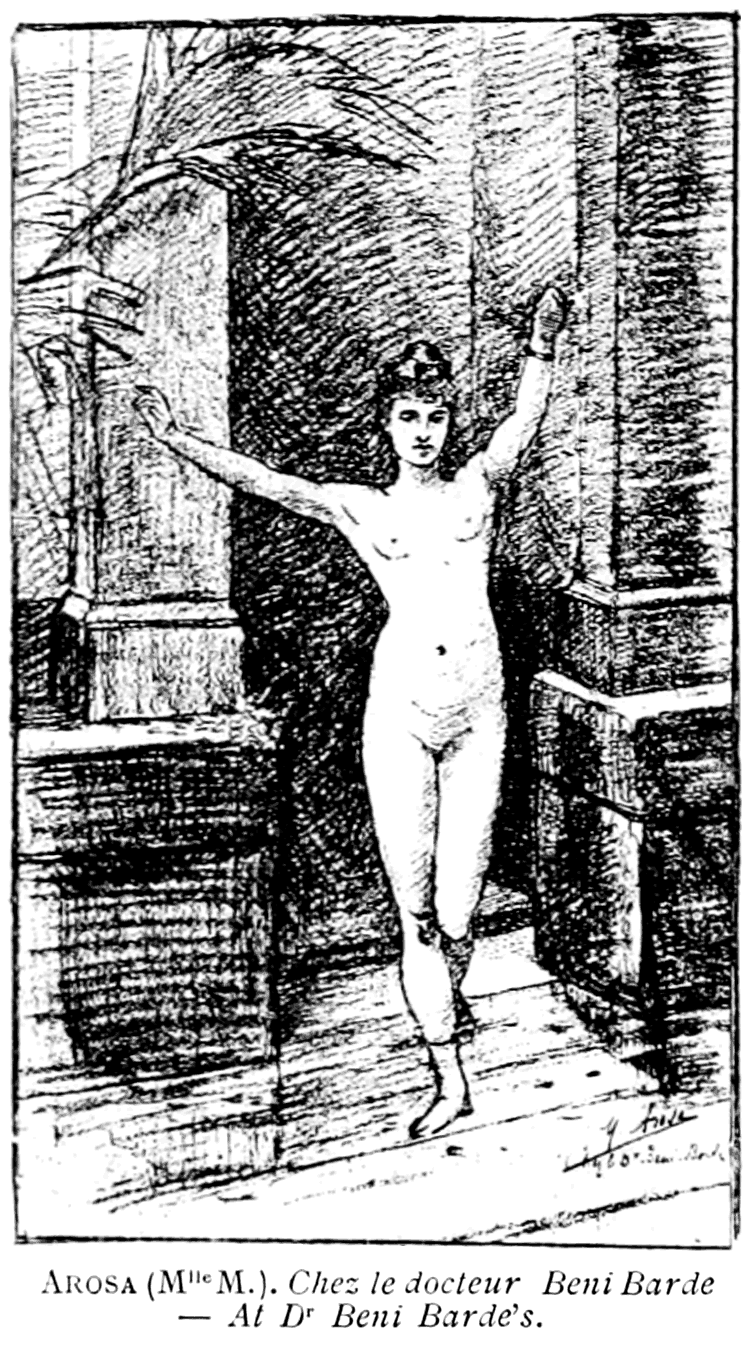
Chez le docteur Beni Barde (1887)

== Sources ==
- Bénézit, Emmanuel (1924). «Arosa (Marguerite)». In Dictionnaire critique et documentaire des peintres, sculpteurs, dessinateurs & graveurs de tous les temps et de tous les pays. Vol. 1. Paris: Ernest Gründ. p. 234.
- Van Houtven, Andrea (2007). «The model and photographer of the Portrait of a Woman submitted to the SFP in 1867 by Tessié du Motay and Maréchal". Études photographiques, no. 35.
- Thieme, Ulrich; Becker, Felix (1908). «Arosa, Marguérite». In Allgemeines Lexikon der Bildenden Künstler von der Antike bis zur Gegenwart. Vol. 2. Leipzig: E. A. Seemann. p. 150.
