= 1718 in France =

- Decades: 1690s; 1700s; 1710s; 1720s; 1730s
- See also: History of France; Timeline of French history; List of years in France

Events from the year 1718 in France.

== Incumbents ==
- Monarch: Louis XV
- Regent: Philip II of Orleans

== Events ==
- January – France declares war on Spain, leading to the 2-year War of the Quadruple Alliance.
- May 7 – New Orleans is founded.

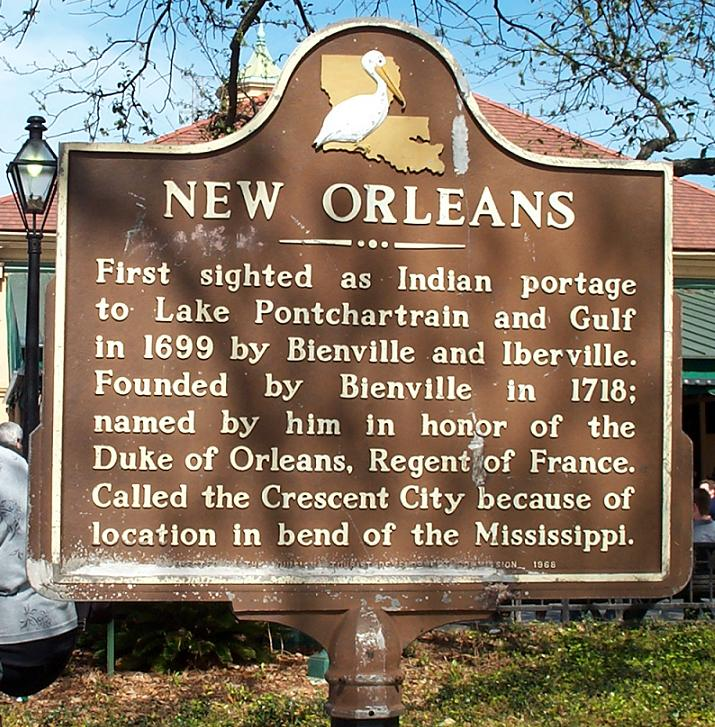
May 7: New Orleans

- November 18 – Voltaire's first play, Oedipus, premières at the Comédie-Française in Paris. This is his first use of the pseudonym.

== Births ==
- January 29 – Paul Rabaut, Huguenot pastor (d. 1794)
- October 19 – Victor-François, 2nd duc de Broglie, Marshal of France (d. 1804)

== Deaths ==
- February 18 – Pierre Antoine Motteux, French-born English dramatist (b. 1663)
- April 3 – Jacques Ozanam, mathematician (b. 1640)
- April 27 – Jacques Bernard, theologian (b. 1658)
- May 22 – Gaspard Abeille, lyric and tragic poet (b. 1648)
- June 13 – Louis, Count of Armagnac, noble (b. 1641)
- July 28 – Étienne Baluze, scholar (b. 1630)
- September 12 – Louise de Maisonblanche, illegitimate daughter of Louis XIV of France (b. 1676)
- October 19 – Alphonse Henri, Count of Harcourt, noble (b. 1646)
