= Bayonne decree =

Bayonne Decree was a Napoleonic decree passed on April 17, 1808, during the Napoleonic Wars. It ordered the seizure of all American ships arriving in France. American vessels in French ports were ruled to be in violation of the Embargo Act of 1807 passed months earlier, or if not, either British or American ships in Britain's service. An estimated US$10 million in American property was confiscated, especially due to the confiscation of vessels that were subject to unavoidable examination by British cruisers.
