= Gabrielle Gauchat =

Gabrielle Gauchat (1767-1805), was a French memoir writer. Her memoirs describe her life as a nun during the dissolution of the convents in France during the French Revolution between 1792 and 1795. Her memoir is one of the few written by nuns from the revolution: of 55 memoirs from the French Revolution, only four were from nuns.

== Biography ==
She was from Saint-Domingue. At the age of only ten, she was placed as a nun in the convent of the Order of the Visitation of Holy Mary, the St-Gengoux de Saône-et-Loire in Langres, upon the wish of her uncle, who was a priest in the cathedral of Langres.

In July 1791, the clergy was banished from Langres after having refused to make the constitutional oath, and in September 1792, the convent was closed and the nuns evicted. Similarly to other nuns who did not have a family to return to or wanted to marry or work, she lived as a guest in the private homes of devout Catholics while maintaining her vows as an individual. Though she refused to make the constitutional oath, she was not arrested during the Reign of Terror, although she was obliged to report regularly to the authorities and denied the state pension the government offered to former nuns for a long time before it was finally granted. In her diary, Gauchat describes herself as the victim of oppression. From June 1795, it was again allowed to practice Catholicism openly, and Gauchat therefore discontinued her diary. In 1802, the convents were again allowed to open in France.

Gabrielle Gauchat wrote a diary from September 1792 and June 1795, which has been published.
