= 1728 in France =

- Decades: 1700s; 1710s; 1720s; 1730s; 1740s
- See also: History of France; Timeline of French history; List of years in France

Events from the year 1728 in France.

== Incumbents ==
- Monarch: Louis XV

== Births ==
- 5 March – Jacques Beaufranchet, Beauvoisis regiment captain
- 5 October – Chevalier d'Eon, French diplomat, spy, soldier and transvestite (d. 1810)

== Deaths ==
- 14 May – Louise Marie d'Orléans, Mademoiselle, French princess (b.1726)
- 15 August – Marin Marais, French viol player and composer (b. 1656)
