= Jean-Louis de Boubers =

French printer and publisher (1731–1804)

- Jean-Louis de Boubers de Corbeville
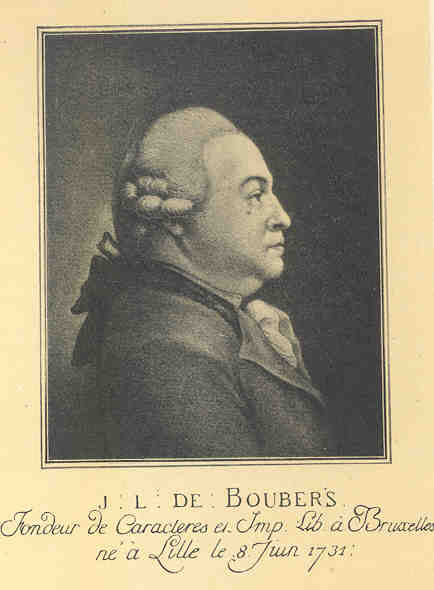
- Jean-Louis de Boubers
- Born: 18 June 1731; Lille (France)
- Died: 30 July 1804 (aged 73); Brussels, France
- Other names: Boubers the Younger
- Known for: editing Jean-Jacques Rousseau
- Spouse: Daughter of André-Joseph Panckoucke
- Scientific career
- Fields: Printer, publisher and bookseller
- Institutions: Dunkerque, Liège, Brussels

Notes
- Freemason, Brussels Lodge Les Vrais Amis de la Justice

Jean-Louis de Boubers de Corbeville sometimes named Boubers the Younger (18 June 1731 – 30 July 1804) was a French printer, publisher and bookseller who moved to the Liege area within the Holy Roman Empire. He was also characters founder, music publisher and paper producer. He became royal printer for the Royal Academy of Science, Letters and Fine Arts of Belgium in Brussels.

== Biography ==
Jean-Louis de Boubers, born in Lille, was the son of Henri-Louis de Boubers de Corbeville, Captain in the Maillé Infantry Regiment and of Marie-Catherine Gavois. He was the brother of Claude-René-Denis de Boubers, named Denis de Boubers, "one of the most remarkable typographer of France", and of Henri-François de Boubers, printer.

Son-in-law in first marriage (1752) of Louis-François Barbier, bookseller in Arras, his second wife (1759) was the daughter of the Lille bookseller André-Joseph Panckoucke. He entered the selected circle of the founder of the eighteenth century first press empire created by Charles-Joseph Panckoucke and Henri Agasse de Cresne. This northern French tradition will continue through Jean Prouvost (fr), founder of the press group Paris Match and Marie Claire.

Printer and bookseller in Dunkerque in 1748, there is strong evidence to indicate that he got another address registration in Liège. "Liège was actually a duty-free country where printing was developing in the eighteenth century because of equally free counterfeiting practices." In 1759, Jean-Louis de Boubers had allegedly been involved in the conflict between Pierre Rousseau (fr) and Liege authorities: he was ordered "to migrate from the city within three times twenty four hours". In 1760, he wished to go to Lille to replace Charles-Joseph Panckoucke but was blocked by the town councillor. However, in 1761, he obtained the Liege Bourgeois diploma.

Then he migrated to Brussels where he got authorization to establish as printer in 1768. Six years later he was responsible of the most prestigious editions of the Jean-Jacques Rousseau complete works in 12 volumes at a London address.

Granted the privilege of Théâtre Royal de la Monnaie bookseller, he published plays and opéras comiques performed from 1777 to 1799.

Freemason, he joined the Brussels Lodge Les Vrais Amis de la Justice. He printed the journal de Bruxelles. Jean-Louis de Boubers died in Brussels in 1804.

== Sources ==
- Société Jean-Jacques Rousseau, Geneva (1997). Annales de la société Jean-Jacques Rousseau. Librairie Droz. pp. 248–. ISBN 978-2-600-00208-0.
- "Boubers, Jean-Louis de". CERL Thesaurus.
- Cornaz, Marie. "Jean-Joseph-Boucherie-et-Jean-Louis-de-Boubers-deux-imprimeurs-de-musique-a-Bruxelles-dans-la-deuxieme-moitie-du-XVIIIe-siecle".
- Droixhe, Daniel. "Une contrefaçon liégeoise exemplaire : les OEuvres du philosophe bienfaisant (1764)". Groupe d'étude du dix-huitième siècle de l'Université de Liège (GEDHS).
- James Swenson (2000). On Jean-Jacques Rousseau: Considered as One of the First Authors of the Revolution. Stanford University Press. pp. 166–. ISBN 978-0-8047-3864-4.
