= Gustave Arosa =

French art collector (1818–1883)

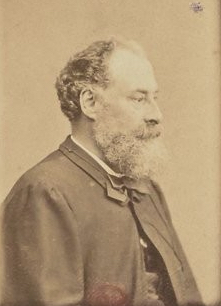
Photograph by Nadar (1865)

Gustave Arosa (1818–1883) was a French art collector and patron.

== Family origins ==
Gustave Arosa was of Spanish extraction. His father Francisco Arosa was born in Madrid in 1786 and crossed the border into France during the summer of 1813, settling first in Bagnères de Bigorre, where he married Annette Guindey in 1815 and where Gustave was born in 1818.

== Art patron ==
Arosa was a collector of realist and impressionist paintings, an art photographer, and tutor of Paul Gauguin from about 1871. His art collection included works by Camille Corot, Eugène Delacroix, and Jean-François Millet.

He introduced Gauguin into Parisian cultural circles and got him a job as a stockbroker in Paris. He also met and introduced Gauguin to Schuffenecker, and the Danish woman Mette-Sophie Gad whom Gauguin married in 1873. In 1874 he also introduced Gauguin to Camille Pissarro.

== Photography ==
Arosa partnered with Tessié du Motay and Maréchal, the inventors of a new collotype process, to create the Société de Phototypie Arosa et Cie. He also collaborated with Nadar.

== Personal life ==
His youngest daughter was the painter Marguerite Arosa.
