= Château-Renard =

- Commune
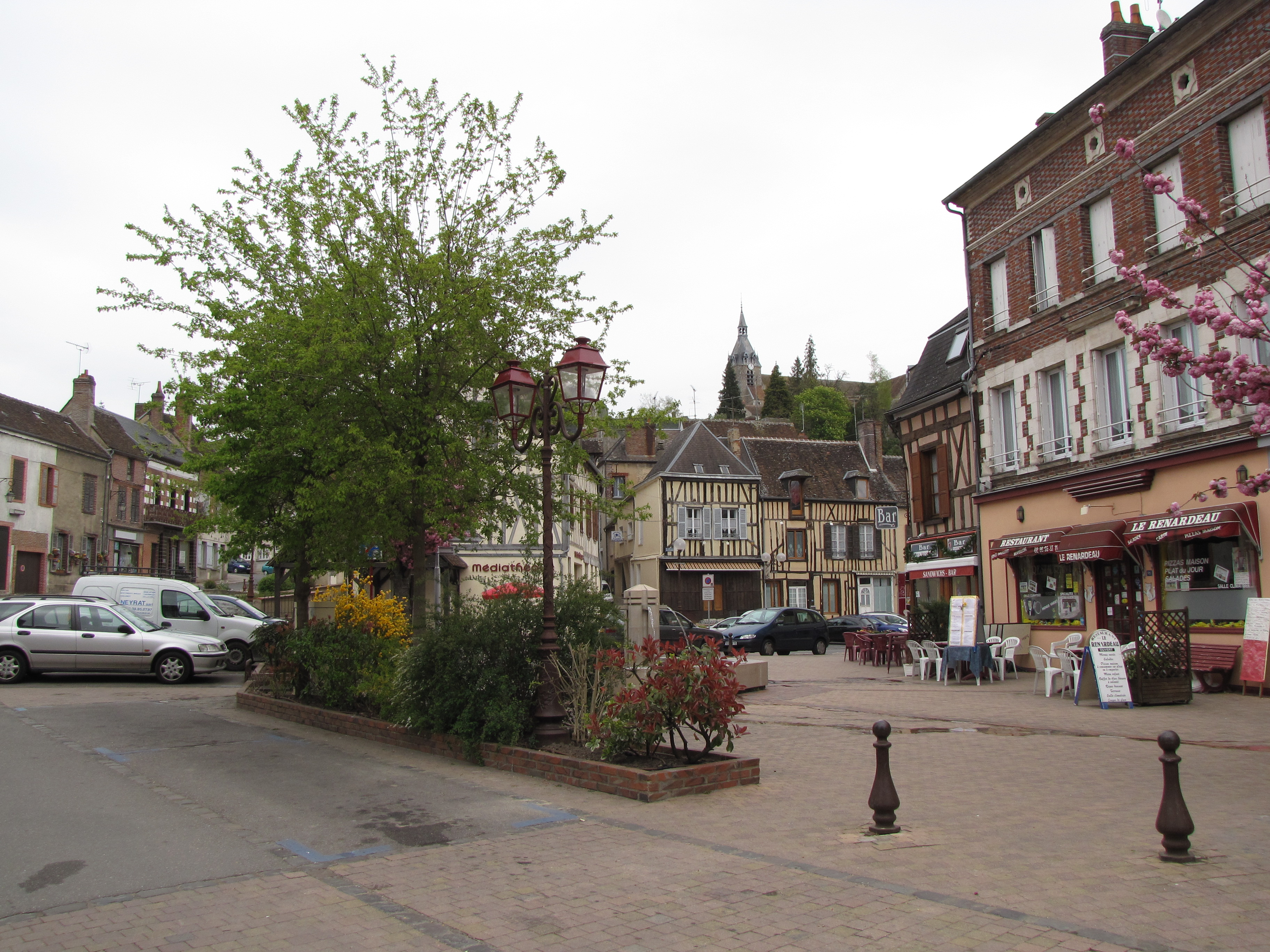
- Place de la Republique

- Coat of arms
- Location of Château-Renard
- Location within France Location within Centre-Val de Loire
- Coordinates: 47°55′53″N 2°55′41″E
- Country: France
- Region: Centre-Val de Loire
- Department: Loiret
- Arrondissement: Montargis
- Canton: Courtenay

Government
  - Mayor (2020–2026): Jocelyn Buron
- Area^{1}: 40.34 km^{2} (15.58 sq mi)
- Highest elevation: 188 m (617 ft)
- Lowest elevation: 104 m (341 ft)
- Population (2023): 2,112
  - Density: 52.35/km^{2} (135.6/sq mi)
- Demonym: Castel-Renardais
- Time zone: UTC+01:00 (CET)
  - Summer (DST): UTC+02:00 (CEST)
- INSEE/Postal code: 45083 /45220
- ^{1} French Land Register data, which excludes lakes, ponds, glaciers > 1 km^{2} (0.386 sq mi or 247 acres) and river estuaries.

Château-Renard (French pronunciation: [ʃɑto ʁənaʁ], before 1998: Châteaurenard) is a commune in the Loiret department in north-central France.

== Geography ==
The commune is traversed by the river Ouanne.

== Population ==
Historical population
Year	Pop.	±% p.a.
1968	2,120	—
1975	2,171	+0.34%
1982	2,223	+0.34%
1990	2,302	+0.44%
1999	2,389	+0.41%
2007	2,345	−0.23%
2012	2,250	−0.82%
2017	2,187	−0.57%
2023	2,112	−0.58%
Source: INSEE

== Sights and monuments ==
- Château de Châteaurenard

== See also ==
- Communes of the Loiret department
