= Louis-Pierre Anquetil =

French historian (1723–1808)

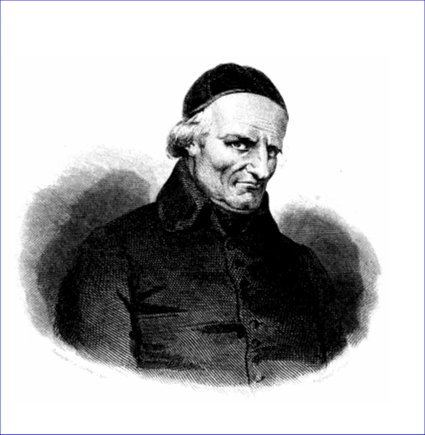
Portrait of Louis-Pierre Anquetil

Louis-Pierre Anquetil (21 February 1723 – 6 September 1808) was a French historian.

== Biography ==
He was born in Paris on 21 February 1723. In 1741, he joined the religious community of the Génofévains, where he took holy orders and became professor of theology and literature. Later, he became rector of the seminary at Reims, where he published the 3-volume "Civil and Political History of Reims" (French: Histoire civile et politique de Reims), in 1756 and 1757. In 1759, he was appointed prior of the abbey de la Roe in Anjou; shortly thereafter he became director of the college of Senlis. While there, he composed a history of France in the 16th and 17th centuries (Esprit de la Ligue, ou histoire politique des troubles de France pendant les XVI^{e} et XVII^{e} siècles) published in 1767. The year before, he had obtained the curacy or priory of Chateau-Renard near Montargis. He also became a member of the Académie des Inscriptions et Belles-Lettres.

At the beginning of the French Revolution, he moved to the curacy of La Villette near Paris but, during the Reign of Terror, he was imprisoned at St-Lazare. While there, he began his summary of world history (Précis de l'histoire universelle), afterwards published in nine volumes. On the establishment of the National Institute, he was elected as a 2nd-class member of the Academy of Moral and Political Science. He was also employed by the French Ministry of Foreign Affairs, an experience which informed his treatment of the last three kings of the Ancient Regime (Motifs des guerres et des traités de paix sous Louis XIV, Louis XV, Louis XVI).

He is said to have been asked by Napoleon to write his 14-volume "History of France" (Histoire de France, 1805). Augustin Thierry criticized the work as "cold and colourless", and mentioned that Anquetil compared unfavorably to other noted French historians. The work was compiled at second or third hand and censurable in many respects but went through numerous editions and made Anquetil famous. It was continued by Adolphe Bouillet in 6 more volumes. He died on 6 September 1808.

His younger brother Abraham was a famous orientalist.
