= The Red Lily (novel) =

1894 novel by Anatole France

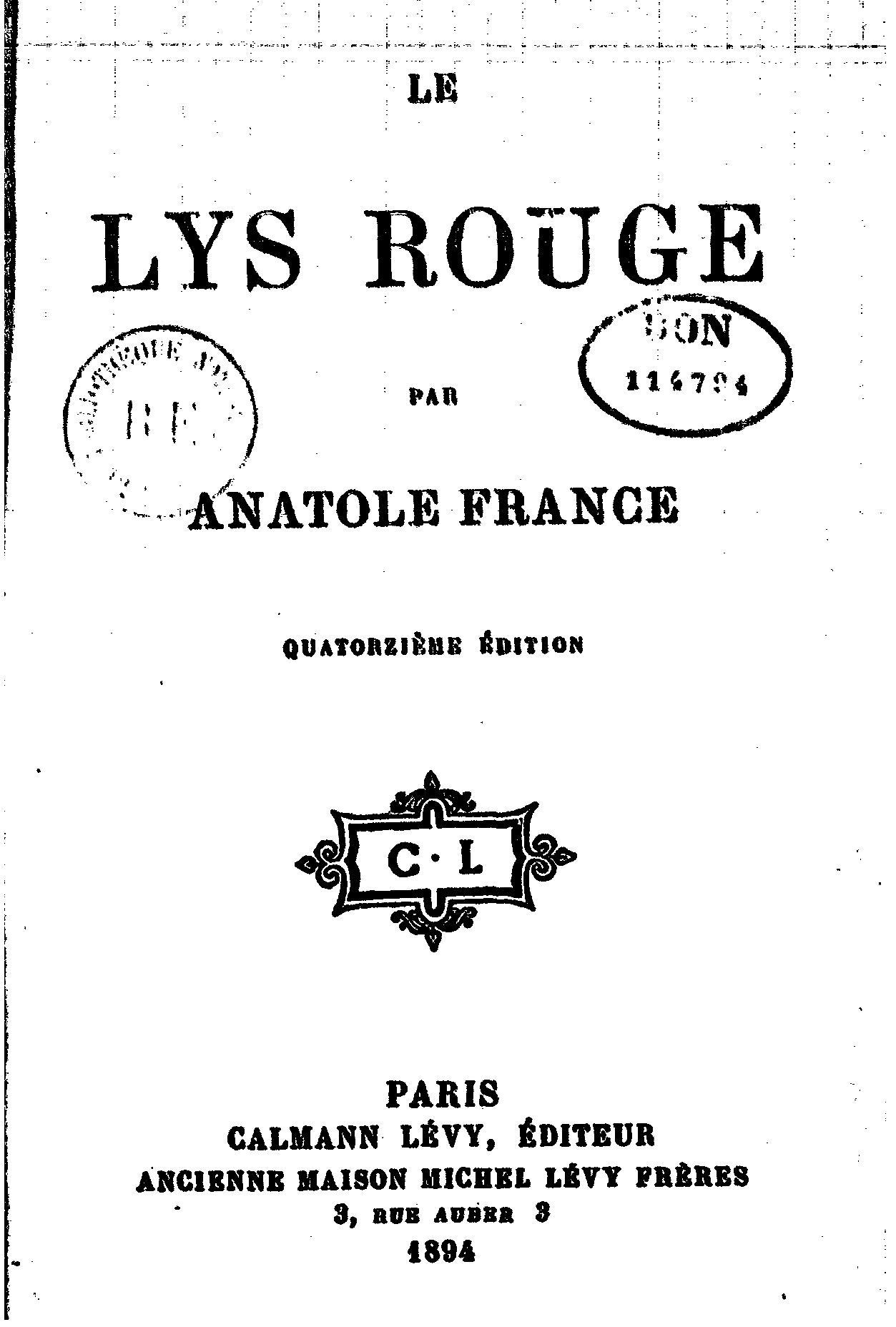
- Title page of the 14th edition
- Original title: Le Lys rouge
- Language: French
- Published: 1894

The Red Lily (French: Le Lys rouge) is a novel by Anatole France, published in 1894.

== Synopsis ==
This novel is the story of an emotional Frenchwoman's liaisons with two men. Madame Therese Martin-Bellème was married by her father to an elderly count, a government minister. After two years of this marriage of convenience she and her husband are strangers in the same house. The beautiful young countess is loved devotedly by Robert Le Menil, and she accepts his love, the first she has known, not because she loves him, but because she is carried away by his love for her. Three years later, she leaves the lover she likes for a lover she loves, Dechartre, a sculptor. She tells him truly that she has never loved another. Le Menil refuses to accept his dismissal by letter and comes to Florence where she is visiting. Dechartre hears of his presence and suspects their former intimacy, but she denies all. Later, in Paris, he hears her name coupled with that of Le Menil, and is tortured with jealousy. She is possessed by the one idea that she must not lose him, the man she loves with all her heart, and tells him again that he is her one lover. Le Menil had gone away to forget her in vain. He returns and follows her to the theatre with reproaches and entreaties which Dechartre overhears. She is obliged to tell her lover the truth. Dechartre refuses to understand that she is not a light woman, or believe her avowals that she has loved him alone, and in a pathetic last interview she realises that her happiness is at an end.

== Analysis ==
Helen Rex Keller writes, "The pictures of Florence and Paris add charm and the minor characters are of interest as personal sketches of the author himself and his contemporaries." Choulette, the anarchist and mystic, an old vagabond full of various enthusiasms, is perhaps a portrait of Verlaine. Miss Bell, the English poet, has been identified with Miss Mary Robinson (later Madame Duclaux); De Chartre has been supposed to represent the passionate side of Anatole France's nature, Paul Vence, the artistic and intellectual side; Schmoll is the Jewish scholar, Oppert.

== Sources ==
- Emery, Elizabeth (2007). "Art as Passion in Anatole France's "Le Lys rouge"". Nineteenth-Century French Studies, 35(3/4). University of Nebraska Press. pp. 641–652.

Attribution:

- Keller, Helen Rex (1924). "Red Lily, The". In The Reader's Digest of Books. The Library of the World's Best Literature. New York: The Macmillan Company. p. 716.
