= Guillaume Massieu =

French churchman, translator and poet (1665–1722)

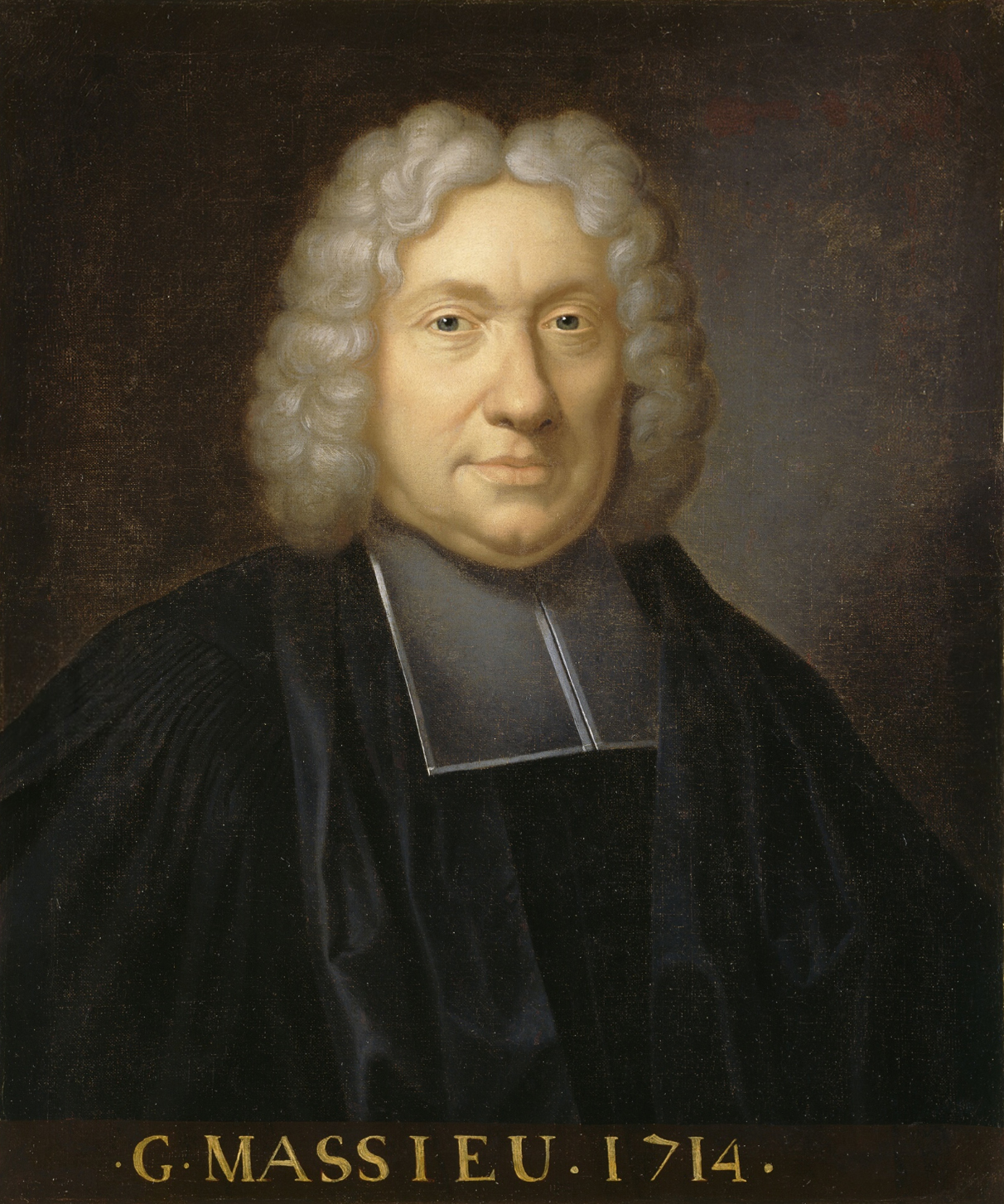
Guillaume Massieu

Guillaume Massieu (13 April 1665, Caen – 26 September 1722, Paris) was a French churchman, translator and poet, best known for his Latin verses in praise of the agreeability and benefits of coffee.

Preceded by Jules de Clérambault	Seat 24 of the Académie française 1714–1722	Succeeded by Claude-François-Alexandre Houtteville
