= Amélie Suard =

French writer and salonnière (1743–1830)

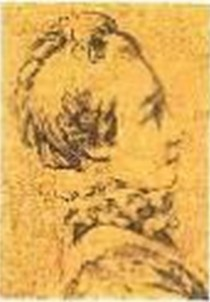
- Born: Amélie Panckoucke; 12 May 1743
- Died: 1830 (aged 86–87)
- Occupation: Salonnière

Amélie Suard (12 May 1743 – 1830) was a French writer and salonnière. Her letters provide a valuable source of information on life in France before the French Revolution of 1789. The Suards remained loyal to the Bourbon regime and experienced difficulty during the revolutionary years, but resumed their salons in 1800 under Napoleon.

== Early years and marriage (1743–67) ==
Amélie Panckoucke was born on 12 May 1743. Her parents, the author and bookseller André-Joseph Panckoucke (1703–53) and Marie–Marguerite Gandouin, married on 12 February 1730. She was one of 15 children, including the writer and publisher Charles-Joseph Panckoucke (1736–1798). Amélie married Jean Baptiste Antoine Suard (1732–1817) on 17 January 1766. They had only one child, a daughter who died very young.

J. B. A. Suard was a journalist who translated many English works into French. He was a minor philosophe who took his ideas from Marie Thérèse Rodet Geoffrin's salon. Before the marriage he also frequented Madame Geoffrin's salon. In the late 1760s and early 1770s J. B. A. Suard attached himself to encyclopédistes such as Jean le Rond d'Alembert. Possibly at the suggestion of Jeanne Julie Éléonore de Lespinasse he was given seat 26 of the Académie Française in 1772. In 1774 he was named censor of theatrical materials by Louis XV.

== Ancien Régime salons (1767–89) ==
Amélie Suard began to visit the salons in the 1760s, where she was to be a leading figure for the remainder of the Ancien Régime. She was one of the better writers of the period, and her letters have great value as sources of information on the period. Madame Geoffrin disapproved of Suard's imprudent marriage since Amélie did not bring a significant dowry and Suard had only a small income. She refused to see either of them for two years, when Madame Necker arranged a meeting. Amélie managed to charm Madame Geoffrin, who supported the Suard's petite ménage from then on. To minimise wear on her best clothes, Amélie often dressed in them just before going out to a salon. The young couple did not have a carriage, and a woman could not visit on foot, but Madame de Marchais or Madame Necker would always send their horses.

The Suards benefitted from the generosity of their friends. Madame d'Épinay reported in a letter to Ferdinando Galiani, "An unknown individual has placed a sum of twenty thousand byres to be placed on the head of M. and Mme Suard as a lifetime income. He took a long time to decide to accept it, and finally they did accept it, on the condition that the benefactor make himself known. He did make himself known after the acceptance: it was M. Necker. This anecdote should please you." The etiquette of gifts like this was that the donor would insist on being anonymous, but their name would become known.

In June 1775 her brother took Amélie to Ferney to visit Voltaire, then aged 77, a philosopher whom they both greatly admired. She was not disappointed, and described the meeting in a series of letters to her husband that combine trivial observations of Voltaire's appearance and habits with philosophical thoughts. For almost two decades Amélie was the closest female friend of the Marquis de Condorcet. He wrote her many letters describing his personal problems and his views on current affairs. Amélie and her husband became close friends of Jacques Antoine Hippolyte, Comte de Guibert when he began to frequent Necker's salon in the 1770s. The Suards held a salon frequented by people such as Joseph Joubert, Madame Geoffrin, Jacques Necker and his wife, D'Alembert and François-René de Chateaubriand. J. B. A. Suard was an acquaintance of Laurence Sterne during his visits to Paris. Unlike many couples at the time, the Suards seem to have remained faithful to each other.

== Revolution (1789–1800) ==
During the worst days of the French Revolution the Suards retired to a small house they owned at Fontenai. Condorcet came to the home of the Suards during the Terror looking for refuge, but was refused and committed suicide. They learned of the death of Maximilien Robespierre in July 1794. Despite his efforts to remain out of trouble, J. B. A. Suard was proscribed and his house was sealed. He was to have been deported as a Royalist, but avoided this by going with his wife in July 1794 to stay with Necker at Coppet.

After Madame de Staël warned her father that it was dangerous for him to shelter proscribed people J. B. A. Suard went into exile in Switzerland and Germany for three years, while Amélie stayed with friends near Paris. Although Amélie's letters were often sentimental, her actions were usually pragmatic and in her own interests. Her husband was lazy, and she had to struggle to advance his career. While he was in exile she kept the newspaper he edited running. In 1799 she joined her husband in Frankfurt, and the two moved to Ansbach where they lived among a small colony of exiles for a year.

== Empire and restoration (1800–30) ==
After Napoleon took power the Suards were able to return to France and Suard was appointed to the well-paid position of Permanent Secretary to the Académie. The Suards reopened their salon. Although Madame Suard did not object to her husband accepting honours and money from Napoleon, whom she saw as a usurper to the throne, she remained distant from Madame de Staël for some time due to her republican opinions. Later Claude Hochet met Benjamin Constant and Madame de Staël at Madame Suard's salon in Paris. Madame Suard continued to hold soirées after the Bourbon Restoration. In 1814 the king made J. B. A. Suard an officer of the Legion of Honour. J. B. A. Suard died in 1817. Amélie worked on compiling his memoirs. Amélie Suard died in 1830.

== Publications ==
- Amélie Suard (1788), Lettres d'un jeune lord à une religieuse italienne (adaptation of 1787 Maria, ou Lettres d'un gentilhomme anglois à une religieuse), Paris: chez les marchands de nouveautés, p. 247
- Amélie Suard (1802), Lettres de madame Suard à son mari sur son voyage à Ferney, suivies de quelques autres insérées dans le Journal de Paris., Guyonne-Élisabeth-Josèphe de Montmorency Luynes, p. 139
- Amélie Suard (1810), Madame de Maintenon, peinte par elle-même, preface by Jean-Baptiste-Antoine Suard, p. 422
  - Amélie Suard (2012), Madame De Maintenon, Peinte Par Elle-même... (reprint), Nabu Press, p. 384, ISBN 978-1272533434
- Amélie Suard (1814), Louis Seize, son testament et sa mort, par une femme, Paris: J. G. Dentu, p. 25
- Amélie Suard (1820), Essais de mémoires sur M. Suard, Paris: impr. de P. Didot, p. 322
- Amélie Suard (1825), Dernier Écrit de Condorcet, précédé d'une notice sur ses derniers momens, Paris: J.-L.-J. Brière, p. 32
- Amélie Suard (1881), Mémoires biographiques et littéraires, Paris: Firmin-Didot, p. 299
- Jean-Antoine-Nicolas de Caritat Condorcet; Amélie Suard (1988), Élisabeth Badinter (ed.), Correspondance inédite de Condorcet et Mme Suard, M. Suard et Garat 1771–1791, Paris: Fayard, p. 262, ISBN 2213021643
- Amélie Suard; Louis P. Couret de Villeneuve (2012), Mes Matinées D'été, Ou Opuscules En Vers Et En Prose: Soirées D'hiver D'une Femme Retirée À La Campagne (reprint), Nabu Press, pp. 328 pages, ISBN 978-1274056726

== Sources ==
- Abel, Jonathan (2016-09-13), Guibert: Father of Napoleon's Grande Armée, University of Oklahoma Press, ISBN 978-0-8061-5691-0
- Amélie Suard (1743–1830) (in French), BnF: Bibliotheque nationale de France
- Barbier, Frédéric; Juratic, Sabine; Vangheluwe, Michel (2002), Lumières du nord: imprimeurs, libraires et "gens du livre" dans le nord au XVIIIe siècle (1701–1789) : dictionnaire prosopographique, Librairie Droz, ISBN 978-2-600-00683-5
- Blennerhassett, Charlotte (1889), Madame de Staël: Her Friends, and Her Influence in Politics and Literature, Cambridge University Press, ISBN 978-1-108-05986-2
- Howes, Alan B. (2002-09-09), Laurence Sterne: The Critical Heritage, Routledge, ISBN 978-1-134-78292-5
- Mme de Staël : Selected Correspondence, translated by Jameson-Cemper, K., Springer Science & Business Media, 2012-12-06, ISBN 978-94-011-4283-0
- Landy, Rémy, "Jean Baptiste SUARD (1732-1817)", Dictionnaire des journalistes (in French), Institut des Sciences de l'Homme - CNRS
- Lilti, Antoine (2015), The World of the Salons: Sociability and Worldliness in Eighteenth-century Paris, Oxford University Press, ISBN 978-0-19-977234-6
- Morgan, Lady Sydney (1817), France
- Popkin, Jeremy (Autumn 1985), "The Condorcet-Suard Correspondence", Eighteenth-Century Studies, 18 (4), The Johns Hopkins University Press. Sponsor: American Society for Eighteenth-Century Studies (ASECS): 550–557, doi:10.2307/2739009, JSTOR 2739009
- Sala, George Augustus; Yates, Edmund Hodgson, eds. (1896), "A Vanished World", Temple Bar, Ward and Lock
- Suard, Amélie (in German), Deutscher Nationalbibliothek
