= Joseph Alphonse de Véri =

French abbot

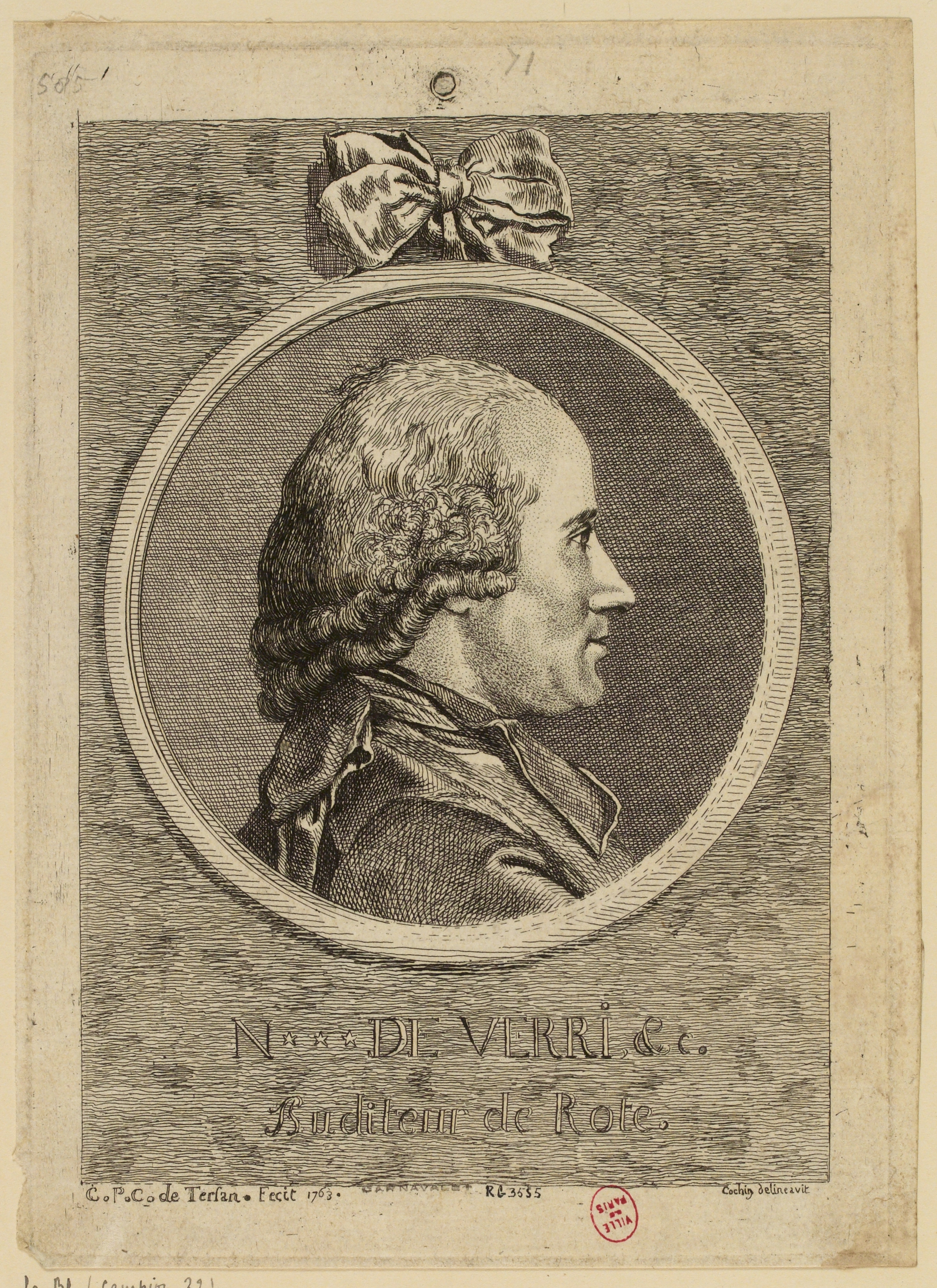
Joseph Alphonse de Véri

Joseph Alphonse de Véri (16 October 1724 – 28 August 1799) was a French abbot. Son of Louis de Veri, a descendant of a noble Florentine family that had settled in the Papal States, Veri was educated at The Sorbonne in Paris, where he gained a doctorate in theology. He was described as an "enlightened clergyman and great admirer of Benjamin Franklin” and Jean-Frédéric de Maurepas’s intimate and confessor.
