= Maurice Floquet =

French supercentenarian (1894–2006)

- Born: Maurice Noël Floquet; 25 December 1894; Poissons, French Third Republic
- Died: 10 November 2006 (aged 111 years, 320 days) Montauroux, France
- Allegiance: France
- Branch: Artillery
- Service years: 1914–1919
- Conflicts: World War I
- Awards: Légion d'honneur

Maurice Noël Floquet (25 December 1894 – 10 November 2006) was France's oldest man on record and was one of the last surviving French veterans of World War I. He is also France's longest-lived soldier of all time. He died on 10 November 2006 at the age of 111 year, 320 days.

== Military service ==
=== World War I ===
Floquet was in the artillery during World War I. His military history has been variously reported. It was said that he joined in September 1914 and served on the Belgian front in December 1914. He was wounded on several occasions. The first of these wounds came at the First Battle of the Marne. A second occurred at the Somme during hand-to-hand fighting with bayonets. The third wound occurred at Beauséjour, part of the 2nd Battle of Champagne; a lump of rock pierced Floquet's throat and obstructed his breathing. By all accounts, it was an enemy soldier who removed the rock and so saved Floquet's life.

A year later, and back on the front line, Floquet was again wounded in the head and left arm when a grenade exploded. The hole in Floquet's head was patched up by a nurse who found a piece of someone else's cartilage. Floquet's outer ear was blown off. After recuperating, toward the end of the war, Floquet was sent to a bomb factory, and was decommissioned in 1919. Floquet still had a German bullet lodged in his arm.

== Later life ==
After the war, Floquet married and became a tractor repairman. He worked his garden until he was over age 100. At age 110, he still rode an exercise bike for 20 minutes a day in the backyard of his apartment — an unusual feat for a supercentenarian. However, by November 2006, Floquet was described as "confined to bed".

Floquet became France's oldest living veteran on 22 March 2002 when Hilaire-Francois Dharboulle died aged 109 years, 54 days, and later also the oldest living man in France upon the death of 111-year-old Polish-born Joseph Rabenda on 20 February 2003, and the oldest living European man upon the death of Jerzy Pajaczkowski-Dydynski on 6 December 2005.

On 24 March 2005, Floquet was promoted by president Jacques Chirac to the rank of officer in the Légion d'honneur.

In May 2006, Floquet became France's oldest verified man on record, when he surpassed Algerian-born Émile Fourcade (1884–1995), who lived to age 111 years and 153 days.

Floquet died aged 111 years, 320 days on 10 November 2006, just one day before the 88th anniversary of the end of World War I. Upon his death, Henry Allingham became the oldest living European man. Upon his death, only four French veterans of World War I survived him. The oldest living man in France after Floquet was Aimé Avignon, who was almost 110 years old at the time.
