= Jean-Baptiste-Antoine Suard =

French journalist, translator and man of letters (1732–1817)

- Born: 15 January 1732; Besançon, France
- Died: 20 July 1817 (aged 85); Paris, France
- Occupations: Journalist; Translator; Literary critic
- Spouse: Amélie Panckoucke

Signature
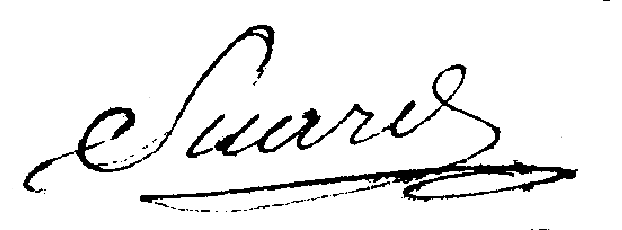

Jean-Baptiste-Antoine Suard (15 January 1732 in Besançon – 20 July 1817 in Paris) was a French writer, translator and man of letters during the Age of Enlightenment.

Suard was incarcerated in the Fort Royal on Île Sainte-Marguerite between 1751 and 1753. On 16 January 1766, he married Amélie Panckoucke, sister of Charles-Joseph Panckoucke. He edited Le journal étranger from 1760 to 1762 and La gazette littéraire d'Europe from 1764 to 1766.

Suard was on intimate terms with the philosophes and regularly attended the salon of Baron d'Holbach, although he seems to have eschewed their more radical ideas. He was closely acquainted with the Marquis de Condorcet, having stayed in residence with him back in 1772. In 1774, he was made a member of the French Academy, and later a state censor. For all his caution, he was later harassed by the Revolutionary and Napoleonic regimes. His Mélanges de littérature were published between 1803 and 1805.

== Bibliography ==
- Académie française: "Jean-Baptiste-Antoine Suard".
