= 1725 in France =

- Decades: 1700s; 1710s; 1720s; 1730s; 1740s
- See also: History of France; Timeline of French history; List of years in France

Events from the year 1725 in France.

== Incumbents ==
- Monarch: Louis XV

== Events ==
- 16 September – The Treaty of Hanover is signed between Great Britain, France and Prussia.
- 1725–1730 - Freemasonry is established in France as an English import.

== Births ==
- 25 January – Antoine Court de Gébelin, French pastor (d. 1784)
- 26 February – Nicolas-Joseph Cugnot, French steam vehicle pioneer (d. 1804)
- 12 May – Louis Philippe I, Duke of Orléans, French soldier and writer (d. 1785)
- 12 May – Jean-Baptiste Donatien de Vimeur, comte de Rochambeau, French soldier (d. 1807)
- 21 August – Jean-Baptiste Greuze, French painter (d. 1805)
- 5 September – Jean-Étienne Montucla, French mathematician (d. 1799)
- 12 September – Guillaume Le Gentil, French astronomer (d. 1792)
- 16 September – Nicolas Desmarest, French geologist (d. 1815)
- 12 October – Etienne Louis Geoffroy, French pharmacist and entomologist (d. 1810)

== Deaths ==
- 6 April – Étienne Chauvin, French Protestant divine (b. 1640)
- 16 September – Antoine V de Gramont, French military leader (b. 1672)
- 10 October – Philippe de Rigaud Vaudreuil, Governor-General of New France (b. c.1643)
- 7 December – Florent Carton Dancourt, French dramatist and actor (b. 1661)
