= Jules de Clérambault =

French abbot (1660–1714)

Jules de Clérambault (ca. 1660 – 17 August 1714) was a French ecclesiastic and Abbot of Saint-Taurin d’Évreux.

He was the son of Marshal of France Philippe de Clérambault de La Palluau, and brother of Philippe, who in 1704 as lieutenant general, was responsible for the defense of the village of Blindheim in the Battle of Blenheim and was killed (drowned) during the battle.

In 1695, he is elected member of the Académie française, succeeding the famous poet and fabulist Jean de La Fontaine.

As Clérambault was a hunchback, he was nicknamed Aesop, after a figure in one of De La Fontaine's stories.

He was a historian and theologian.

Cultural offices
Preceded by Jean de La Fontaine	Seat 24; Académie française 1695–1714	Succeeded by Guillaume Massieu
