= 1724 in France =

- Decades: 1700s; 1710s; 1720s; 1730s; 1740s
- See also: History of France; Timeline of French history; List of years in France

Events from the year 1724 in France.

== Incumbents ==
- Monarch: Louis XV

== Events ==
- The Rémy Martin cognac house is established.

== Births ==
- July 31 – Noël François de Wailly, French lexicographer (d. 1801)
- October 16 – Joseph Alphonse de Véri, abbot (d. 1799)
- December 30 – Louis-Jean-François Lagrenée, French painter (d. 1805)

== Deaths ==
- October 2 – François-Timoléon de Choisy, French writer (b. 1644)
