= Jean-Baptiste Blanchard =

French Jesuit and educator

Jean-Baptiste Blanchard (12 October 1731, at Tourteron in the department of Ardennes – 15 June 1797) was a French Jesuit and educator, one of the contemporary opponents of Rosseau.

== Biography ==
Blanchard was born in Tourteron in the department of Ardennes. In 1746 he entered the Society of Jesus, and later was professor at Metz, Verdun, and Pont-à-Mousson. At the time of the suppression of the Society he changed his name of Duchesne to that of Abbé Blanchard, under which his works were published. He left the order, however, in 1762, before it was suppressed, retired to Belgium, and for seven years remained near Namur, occupied with pedagogical questions. He wrote "Le temple des Muses fabulistes" (Liège, 1776, 2 vols.) and "L'Ecole des mœurs" (Namur and Paris, 1775, 2 vols.). The latter work was first published without the author's name under the title, "Les poète des mœurs, ou les maximes de la sagesse..." (1771), and later was reprinted several times with the title "Maximes des l'honnête homme, ou les poète des mœurs."

Blanchard's main work was published after his death by Bruyset, "Préceptes pour l'éducation des deux sexes à l'usage des families chrétiennes" (Lyon, 1803, 2 vols.); a new edition in 1807 was entitled "Education chrétienne à l'usage de l'un et de l'autre sexe." This work aims to apply the principles of Rousseau's "Emile" to Christian education. It is divided into three parts: physical education, moral education, and education of girls.

In this book, Blanchard attaches great importance to physical culture, health, hygiene of the whole organism, and of the special sense-organs, and gives practical rules for the formation of intellect, feelings, and will. He insists on good pronunciation and reading, and rejects Rousseau's principle of negative education as harmful. Blanchard writes that women are made for dependence, and that therefore the instruction of girls should be basic and limited, founded on Fénelon's principals and the "Avis d'une mère à sa fille" of Madame de Lambert.
