= Louise Rosalie Allan-Despreaux =

French actress (1810–1856)

Louise Rosalie Allan-Despreaux (1810 – March 1856) was a French actress.

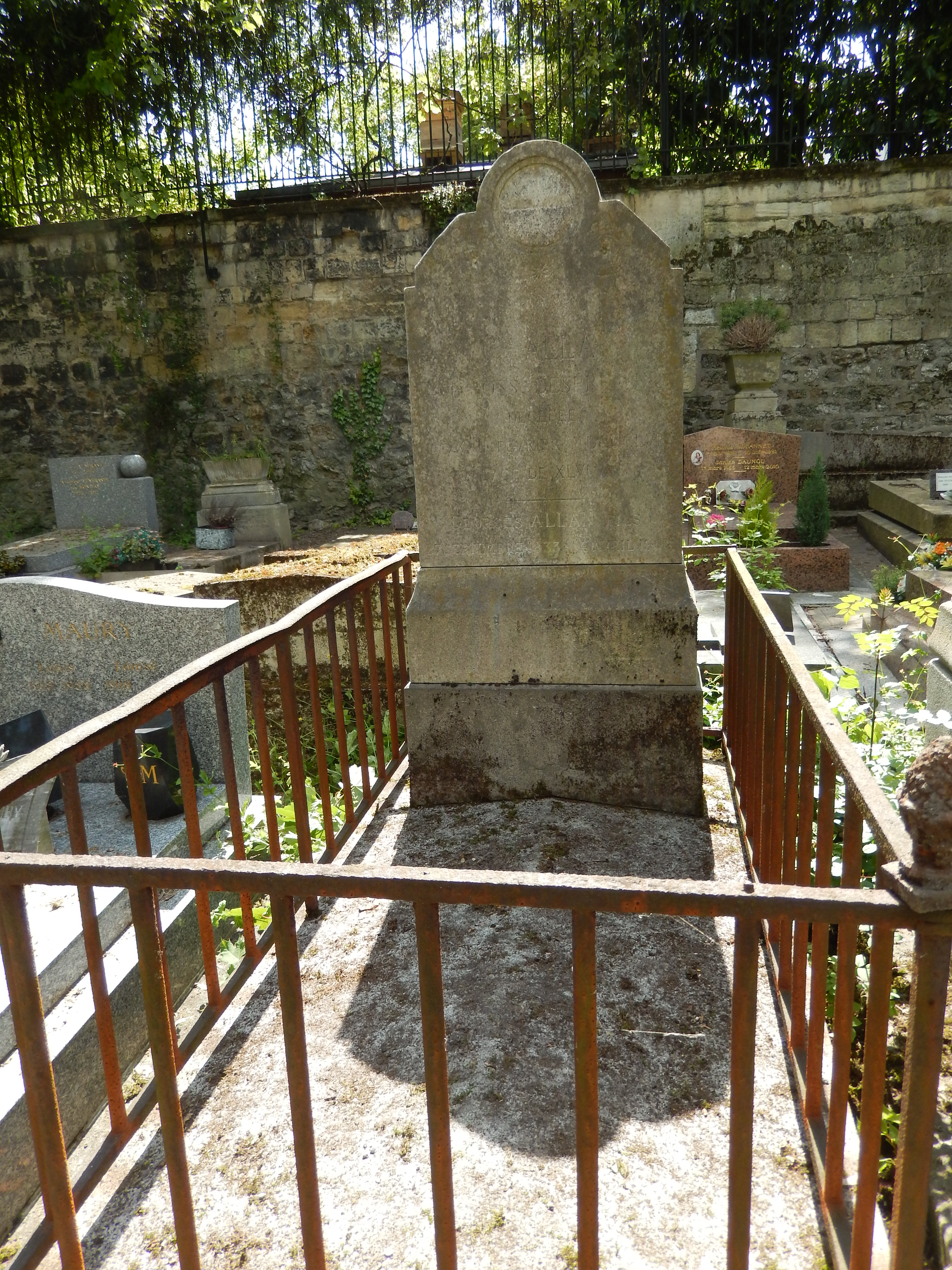

She was "discovered " by François Joseph Talma at Brussels in 1820, when she played Joas with him in Athalie. At his suggestion she changed her surname, Ross, for her mother's maiden name, and, as Mlle. Despreaux, was engaged for children's parts at the Comédie-Française. At the same time she studied at the Conservatoire. By 1825 she had taken the second prize for comedy, and was engaged to play ingenue parts at the Comédie-Française, where her first appearance in this capacity was as Jenny in L'Argent on 8 December 1826.

In 1831 the director of the Gymnase succeeded in persuading her to join his company. Her six years at this theatre, during which she married Allan, an actor in the company, were a succession of triumphs. She was then engaged at the French theatre at St. Petersburg, a scene praised by the Russian aristocracy and the Imperial family.

Returning to Paris, she brought with her, as Legouve says, a thing she had unearthed, a little comedy never acted until she took it up, a production half-forgotten, and esteemed by those who knew it as a pleasing piece of work in the Marivaux style: Un Caprice by Alfred de Musset, which she had played with success in French in St. Petersburg. Her selection of this piece for her reappearance at the Comédie-Française (1847) laid the cornerstone of Musset's lasting fame as a dramatist. In the following year his comedy Il ne faut jurer de rien was acted at the same theatre, and thus led to the production of his finer plays.

Among plays by other authors in which Mlle Allan-Despreaux won special laurels at the Comédie-Française, were Par droit de conquête, Péril en la demeure, La joie fait peur, and Lady Tartuffe. In the last, with a part of only fifty lines, and playing by the very side of the great Rachel, she yet held her own as an actress of the first rank.

Mlle Allan-Despreaux died in Paris, in the height of her popularity, in March 1856.
