= Jacques Claude Demogeot =

Jacques Claude Demogeot (5 July 1808 – 1894) was a French man of letters.

== Biography ==
Demogeot was born in Paris. He was professor of rhetoric at the Lycée Saint-Louis, and subsequently assistant professor at the Sorbonne. He wrote many detached papers on various literary subjects, and two reports on secondary education in England and Scotland in collaboration with Henry Montucci. His reputation rests on his Histoire de la littérature française depuis ses origines jusqu’à nos jours (1851), which has passed through many subsequent editions. He was the author of a Tableau de la littérature française au XVII^{e} siècle (1859), and of a work (3 vols., 1880–1883) on the influence of foreign literatures on the development of French literature. He died in Paris in 1894.
