= 1726 in France =

- Decades: 1700s; 1710s; 1720s; 1730s; 1740s
- See also: History of France; Timeline of French history; List of years in France

Events from the year 1726 in France.

== Incumbents ==
- Monarch: Louis XV

== Events ==
- 11 July – André-Hercule Cardinal de Fleury, recalled from exile by King Louis XV, banishes Louis Henri, Duke of Bourbon, and Madame de Prie from court.

== Births ==
- 14 January – Jacques-Donatien Le Ray, French supporter of the American Revolution (d. 1803)
- 20 June – Louise Henriette of Bourbon, Duchess of Orléans, mother of Philippe Égalité (d. 1759)
- 1 September – François-André Danican Philidor, French composer and chess player (d. 1795)

== Deaths ==
- 25 January – Guillaume Delisle, French cartographer (b. 1675)
- 18 June – Michel Richard Delalande, French organist and composer (b. 1657)
