= Armand Gautier =

French painter

Amand Gautier
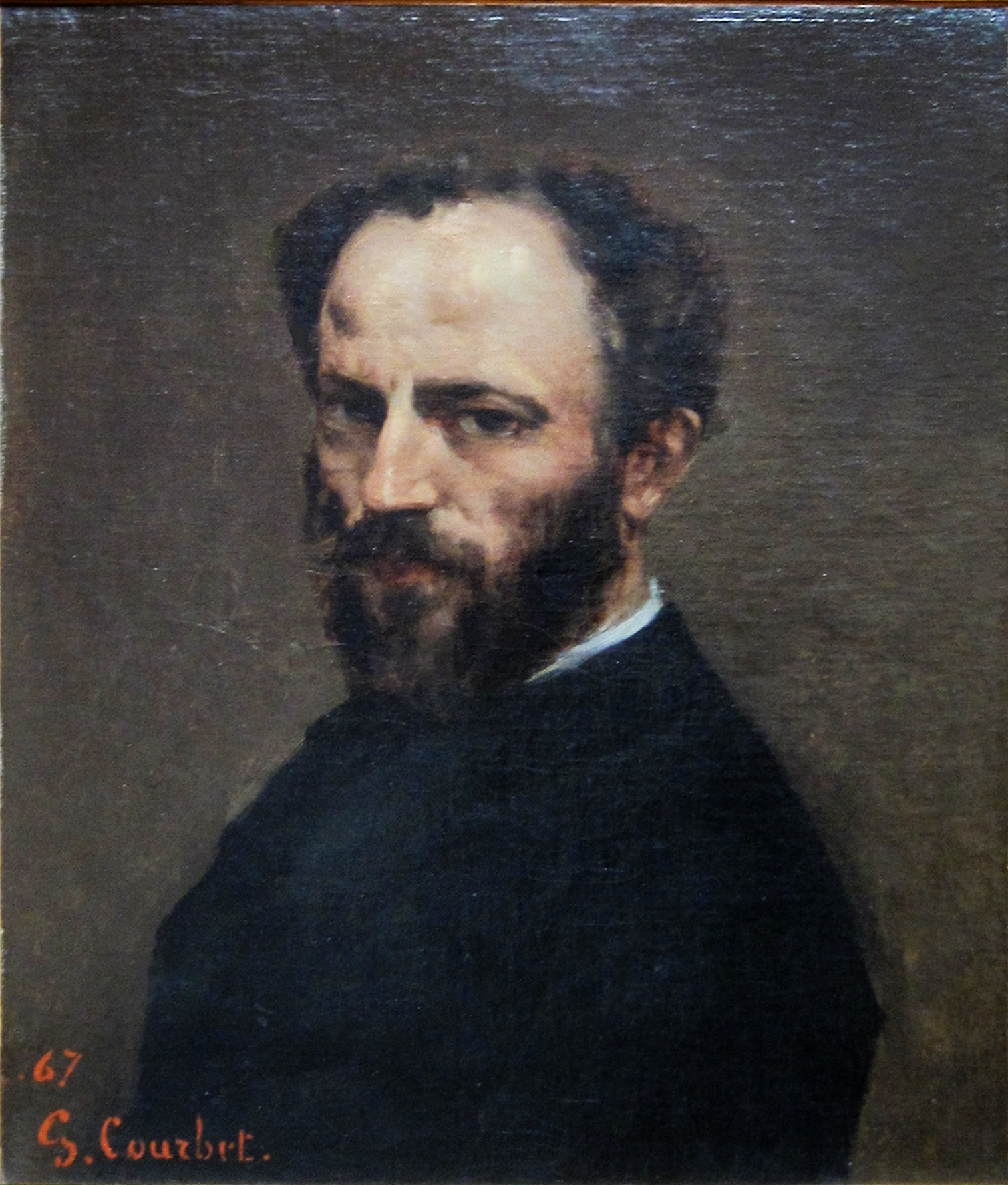
- Born: 19 June 1825; Lille, France
- Died: 29 January 1894 (aged 68); Paris, France

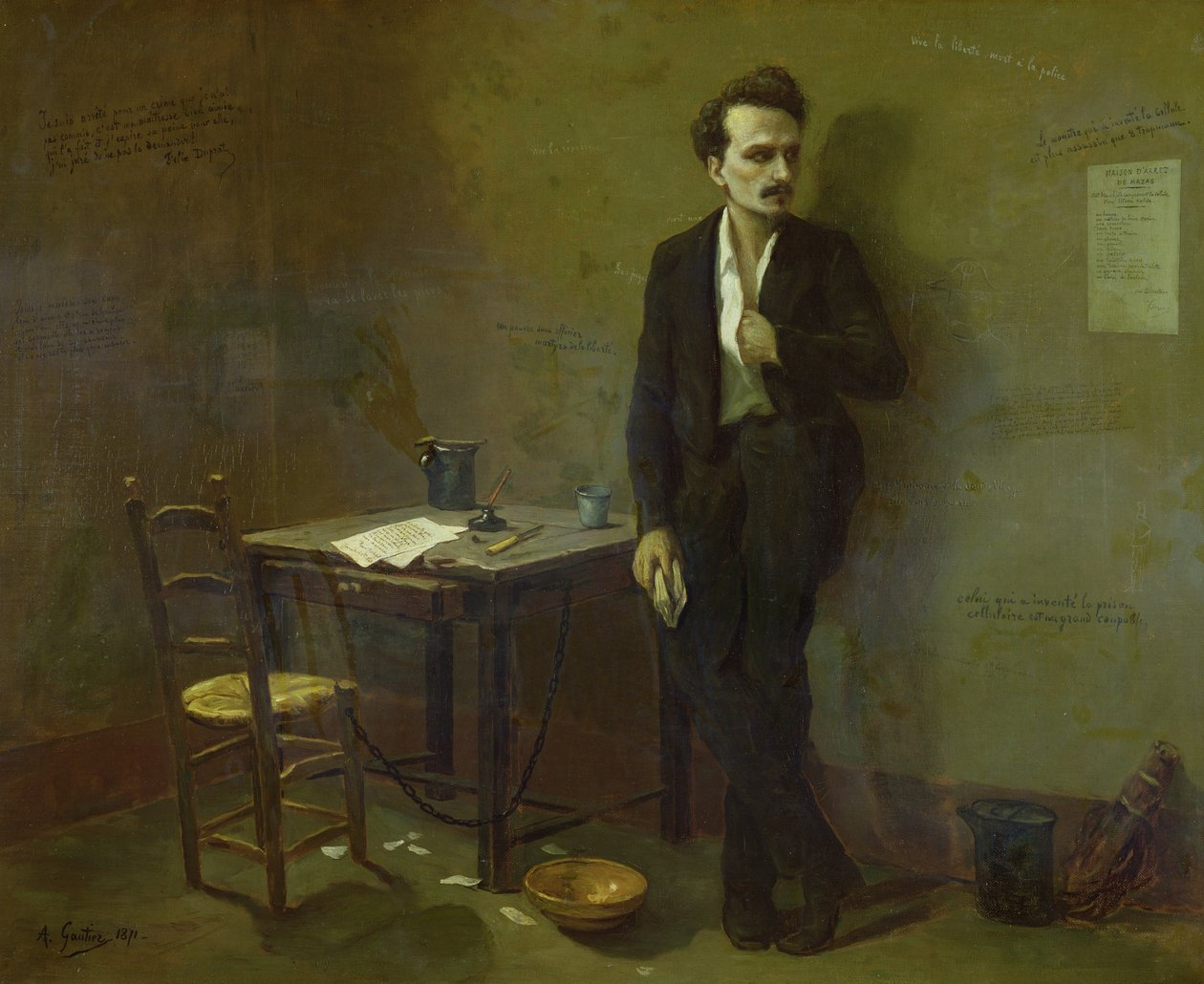
Armand Gautier, Henri Rochefort in Mazas Prison, 1871, oil on canvas. Musee d'Art et d'Histoire, Saint-Denis, France

Armand Désiré Gautier (19 June 1825 – 29 January 1894) was a French painter and lithographer. He was a student of Léon Cogniet. He was named "the Painter of the Sisters of Charity", and the E. Boudin Museum preserves one of his works.
