= Jean-Baptiste Dubois de Jancigny =

French agronomist and scientist

Jean-Baptiste Dubois de Jancigny (21 May 1753 – 1 April 1808) was a French agronomist and scientist.
