= 1719 in France =

- Decades: 1690s; 1700s; 1710s; 1720s; 1730s
- See also: History of France; Timeline of French history; List of years in France

Events from the year 1719 in France.

== Incumbents ==
- Monarch – Louis XV
- Regent: Philip II of Orleans

== Events ==
- 1718 to 1720 – The Pontcallec Conspiracy
- April 4 – The French army under James FitzJames, 1st Duke of Berwick invades the Basque provinces of Spain, with 20,000 troops crossing into Navarre
- May 23 – Mississippi Company becomes the Compagnie Perpétuelle des Indes
- June 30 – Berwick begins the Siege of San Sebastian in northern Spain
- August 19 – San Sebastian surrenders to Berwick. Local leaders petition for the surrounding province to be annexed to France, but is later returned to Spain at the Treaty of The Hague

== Births ==
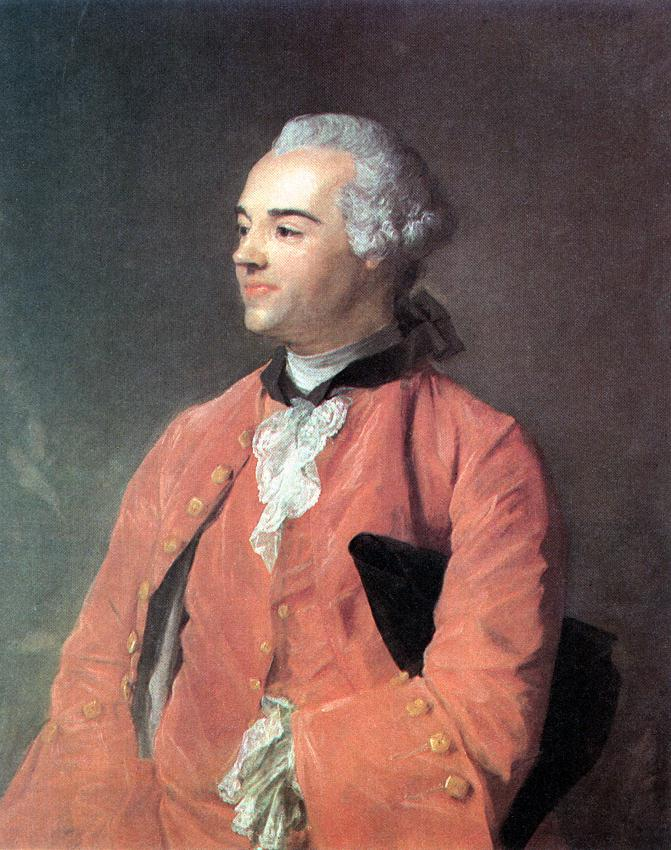
Jacques Cazotte

- October 17 – Jacques Cazotte, writer (died 1792)

== Deaths ==
- March 3 – Jacques-Louis de Valon, soldier and poet (born 1659)
- March 10 – Jean-Baptiste Alexandre Le Blond, architect and garden designer (born 1679)
- November 8 – Michel Rolle, mathematician (born 1652)
