= Mathieu-Richard-Auguste Henrion =

Mathieu-Richard-Auguste Henrion (b. Metz, 19 June 1805; d. Aix-en-Provence, September, 1862) was a Baron, French magistrate, historian, and journalist. After completing his studies in law, he became a member of the Paris Bar as avocat à la cour royale. Under the July Monarchy he was made assistant librarian at the Bibliothèque Mazarine; Napoleon III appointed him counsellor at the court of appeals of La Guadeloupe, whence he was transferred in the same capacity to the court of Aix, a position which he occupied until his death.

He contributed for the greater part of his life to Catholic and royalist periodicals—first to the Drapeau Blanc, then the Journal de l'Instruction Publique, and to others of lesser importance. Finally, in 1840, he assumed the editorship of L'Ami de la Religion, which in 1848 came under the control of Felix Dupanloup. Besides his numerous articles in periodicals, Henrion wrote many books which show his Catholic and royalist convictions - he belonged to the generation of fiery French Ultramontanes of the middle of the nineteenth century. His principal works are:

- Histoire des ordres religieux (Paris, 1831)
- Tableau des congrégations religieuses formées en France depuis le XVIIe siècle (Paris, 1831)
- Histoire de la papauté (History of the Papacy), Paris, 1832
- Histoire générale de l'Eglise pendant les XVIIIe et XIXe siècles (Paris, 1836)
- Histoire littéraire de la France au moyen-age (Paris, 1837)
- Vie et travaux apostoliques de M. de Quélen, archevêque de Paris (Paris, 1840)
- Histoire generale de l'Eglise (Paris, 1843-)
- Vie de M. Frayssinous (Paris, 1844)
- Vie du Père Loriquet (Paris, 1845).
