= 1868 in France =

- Decades: 1840s; 1850s; 1860s; 1870s; 1880s
- See also: History of France; Timeline of French history; List of years in France

Events from the year 1868 in France.

== Incumbents ==
- Monarch – Napoleon III

== Events ==
- March - Geologist Louis Lartet discovers the first identified skeletons of Cro-Magnon, the first anatomically modern humans (early Homo sapiens sapiens), at Abri de Crô-Magnon, a rock shelter at Les Eyzies in the Dordogne.
- 18 August - The element later named as helium is first detected in the spectrum of the Sun's chromosphere by astronomer Jules Janssen during a total eclipse in Guntur, India, but assumed to be sodium (on 20 October English astronomer Norman Lockyer identifies it).
- October - The French military mission to Japan (1867–68) is ordered to leave by Imperial decree.
- Jules-Emile Planchon and colleagues propose Phylloxera as the cause of the Great French Wine Blight.
- Jean-Martin Charcot describes and names multiple sclerosis.
- Louis Arthur Ducos du Hauron patents methods of color photography.
- Ernest and Auguste Bollée first patent the Éolienne Bollée wind turbine.

== Arts and literature ==
- January - Émile Zola defends his first major novel, Thérèse Raquin (1867), against charges of pornography and corruption of morals.
- Establishment of the Académie Julian, a major art school in Paris that admits women, by Rodolphe Julian.
- Aristide Cavaillé-Coll's organ at Notre-Dame de Paris is dedicated.

== Sport ==
- The first documented bicycle race is generally held to be a 1,200 m race at the Parc de Saint-Cloud in Paris.

== Births ==
=== January to June ===
- 17 January - Louis Couturat, logician, mathematician, philosopher, and linguist (died 1914)
- 27 January - Jenny Sacerdote, under birth name Jeanne Adèle Bernard, famous Parisian dressmaker (died 1962)
- 3 March - Émile Chartier, philosopher, journalist and pacifist (died 1951)
- 1 April - Edmond Rostand, poet and playwright (died 1918)
- 28 April - Émile Bernard, painter (died 1941)
- 6 May - Gaston Leroux, journalist, detective and novelist (died 1927)
- 18 June - Georges Lacombe, sculptor and painter (died 1916)

=== July to December ===
- 27 July - Eugène Apert, pediatrician (died 1940)
- 28 July - André Spire, poet, writer, and Zionist activist (died 1966)
- 6 August - Paul Claudel, poet, dramatist and diplomat (died 1955)
- 11 August - Théodore Eugène César Ruyssen, historian of philosophy and pacifist (died 1967)
- 24 October - Alexandra David-Néel, explorer (died 1969)
- 19 November - Gustave-Auguste Ferrié, radio pioneer and army general (died 1932)
- 25 December - Eugenie Besserer, actress (died 1934)

== Deaths ==
- 13 January - Arthur-Marie Le Hir, Biblical scholar and Orientalist (born 1811)
- 22 January - Étienne Serres, physician and embryologist (born 1786)
- 8 February - Jacques Camou, general (born 1792)
- 11 February - Léon Foucault, physicist (born 1819)
- 22 April - Jean-François Jarjavay, anatomist and surgeon (born 1815)
- 24 April - Mary Euphrasia Pelletier, Roman Catholic nun (born 1796)
- 6 May - Louis Marie de la Haye, Vicomte de Cormenin, jurist and political pamphleteer (born 1788)
- 14 June - Claude Servais Mathias Pouillet, physicist (born 1791)
- 22 August - Jean-François Barrière, historian (born 1786)
- 28 August - Antoine Clot, physician (born 1793)
- 24 December - Adolphe d'Archiac, geologist and paleontologist (born 1802)
- December - Pierre Carmouche, playwright (born 1797)
