= 1871 in France =

- Decades: 1850s; 1860s; 1870s; 1880s; 1890s
- See also: History of France; Timeline of French history; List of years in France

Events from the year 1871 in France.

== Incumbents ==
- President: Louis Jules Trochu (until 13 February), Adolphe Thiers (starting 17 February)
- President of the Council of Ministers: Louis-Jules Trochu (until 22 January), Jules Armand Dufaure (starting 19 February)

== Events ==
- 3 January - Battle of Bapaume, a Prussian victory in the continuing Franco-Prussian War.
- 10 January - Besieged city of Péronne surrenders to Prussian forces.
- 10–12 January - Battle of Le Mans ends French resistance in western France.
- 15–17 January - Battle of the Lisaine: Prussian victory.
- 18 January - Prussian King Wilhelm I is proclaimed German Emperor in the Hall of Mirrors at Versailles.
- 19 January - Battle of St. Quentin: Prussians defeat French attempts to relieve the siege of Paris.
- 19–20 January - Battle of Buzenval: Prussian victory.
- 28 January - Siege of Paris (1870–71) ends with the city falling to Prussian forces.
- 8 February - 1871 French legislative election elects the first legislature of the Third Republic; monarchists (Legitimists and Orleanists) favourable to peace with the German Empire gain a large majority. The National Assembly meets in Bordeaux.
- 15 February - Armistice signed between France and Prussia.
- 18 February - Siege of Belfort ends with surrender of French garrison.
- 26 February - Treaty of Versailles ends the Franco-Prussian War.
- 18 March - Troops of the regular French Army sent by Adolphe Thiers, Chef du pouvoir executive de la République française, to seize cannons stored on the Butte Montmartre fraternise with civilians and the National Guard, and two army generals are killed: origin of the Paris Commune. Regular troops are evacuated to Versailles.
- 23 March - Marseille Commune begins.
- 26 March - The Paris Commune is formally established.
- 4 April - Marseille Commune suppressed with the loss of 30 soldiers and 150 insurgents.
- 10 May - Treaty of Frankfurt is signed confirming the frontiers between Germany and France. The provinces of Alsace and Lorraine are transferred from France to Germany.
- 21 May - Government troops enter Paris to overthrow the Commune, beginning "Bloody Week" (Semaine sanglante).
- 27 May - Government troops massacre 147 Communards from Belleville at Père-Lachaise Cemetery.
- 28 May - Paris Commune falls to government forces.
- 2 July - July 1871 French by-elections for the legislative assembly are held.
- 31 August - Adolphe Thiers becomes President.
- 27 October - Henri, Count of Chambord, refuses to be crowned "King Henry V of France" until the country abandons its tricolor, and returns to the old Bourbon flag.

== Literature ==
- Jules Verne - Une ville flottante
- Émile Zola - La Fortune des Rougon

== Births ==
- 7 January - Émile Borel, mathematician and politician (died 1956)
- 6 May - Victor Grignard, chemist, shared the Nobel Prize in Chemistry in 1912 (died 1935)
- 27 May - Georges Rouault, painter and printmaker (died 1958)
- 10 July - Marcel Proust, novelist, essayist and critic (died 1922)
- 29 August - Albert Lebrun, politician and President of France (died 1950)
- 30 October - Paul Valéry, poet, essayist and philosopher (died 1945)
- Undated
  - Camille Gandilhon Gens d'Armes, French poet (d. 1948)

== Deaths ==
- 25 January - Jeanne Villepreux-Power, marine biologist (born 1794)
- 2 March - Antoine Léon Morel-Fatio, naval painter (born 1810)
- 3 April - Gustave Flourens, revolutionary leader and writer (born 1838)
- 8 April - Jean-Baptiste Guimet, industrial chemist (born 1795)
- 13 May - Daniel Auber, composer (born 1782)
- 22 May - Jean-François Cail, entrepreneur and industrialist (born 1804)
- June - Charles Antoine Lemaire, botanist and botanical author (born 1800)
- 1 July - Charles Texier, historian and archaeologist (born 1802)
- 20 July - François Delsarte, musician and teacher (born 1811)
- 5 August - Paul Gallocher de Lagalisserie, engineer (born 1805)
- 9 September - Louis Édouard Bouët-Willaumez, admiral (born 1808)
- Full date unknown - Louis Dominique Girard, hydraulic engineer (born 1815)
