= 1869 in France =

- Decades: 1840s; 1850s; 1860s; 1870s; 1880s
- See also: History of France; Timeline of French history; List of years in France

Events from the year 1869 in France.

== Incumbents ==
- Monarch – Napoleon III

== Events ==
- 2 May - Folies Bergère opens in Paris as the Folies Trévise.
- 23 May - Legislative election held.
- 6 June - Legislative election held to elect the fourth legislature of the French Second Empire.
- 15 July - Hippolyte Mège-Mouriès files a patent for margarine.

== Births ==
- 7 March - Paul Émile Chabas, painter (died 1937)
- 8 April - Charles Binet, Archbishop of Besançon and Cardinal (died 1936)
- 12 April - Henri Désiré Landru, serial killer (executed 1922)
- 23 April - Louise Compain, feminist author (died 1941)
- 29 July - Paul Aymé, tennis player (died 1962)
- 22 November - André Gide, author and winner of Nobel Prize in literature in 1947 (died 1951)
- 31 December - Henri Matisse, artist (died 1954)

== Deaths ==
- 8 January - Joseph Jean Baptiste Xavier Fournet, geologist and metallurgist (born 1801)
- 8 March - Hector Berlioz, composer (born 1803)
- 31 March - Allan Kardec, founder of Spiritism (born 1804)
- 8 June - Felix-Joseph Barbelin, Jesuit influential in the development of the Catholic community in Philadelphia (born 1808)
- 6 September - Jean-Pierre Dantan, sculptor (born 1800)
- 7 September - Auguste Simon Paris, notary and entomologist (born 1794)
- 13 October - Charles Augustin Sainte-Beuve, literary critic (born 1804)
- 15 October - Charles Nicholas Aubé, physician and entomologist (born 1802)
- 31 December - Louis James Alfred Lefébure-Wély, organist (born 1817)
