= 1800 in France =

- Decades: 1780s; 1790s; 1800s; 1810s; 1820s
- See also: History of France; Timeline of French history; List of years in France

Events from the year 1800 in France.

== Incumbents ==
- The French Consulate

== Events ==
- January - Constitutional Referendum held which ratifies a new constitution.
- 21 January - decree abolishing the commissioners of the Treasury and entrusting the service to Bertrand Dufresne, director general subordinate to the Minister of Finance Martin-Michel-Charles Gaudin.
- 13 February - Foundation of the Banque de France.
- 6 April - Siege of Genoa begins, with the Austrians besieging the French garrison.
- 3 May - Battle of Engen, French victory over Austrian forces.
- 3 May - Battle of Stockach, French victory.
- 15 May - Battle of Erbach, French victory with heavy casualties on both sides.
- 15 May - Napoleon Bonaparte crosses the Alps and invades Italy.
- 4 June - Siege of Genoa ends in a tactical victory for Austria.
- 9 June - Battle of Montebello, French victory.
- 14 June - Battle of Marengo, French victory, driving the Austrians out of Italy.
- 19 June - Battle of Höchstädt, French victory.
- 5 September - At the invitation of the Maltese, British troops liberate the Islands of Malta and Gozo from the French.
- 30 September - The Convention of 1800 (Treaty of Mortefontaine), signed between the United States and France, ends the Quasi-War.
- 1 October - Third Treaty of San Ildefonso, secretly negotiated between France and Spain, by which Spain returns the colonial territory of Louisiana to France.
- 10 October - Conspiration des poignards, conspiracy to assassinate Napoleon Bonaparte, which is prevented.
- 12 October - Boston-Berceau Action: The United States captures a French ship.
- 3 December - Battle of Hohenlinden, decisive French victory over Austrian forces.
- 24 December - Plot of the Rue Saint-Nicaise, assassination attempt on Napoleon Bonaparte in Paris.
- 25 December - Battle of Pozzolo: French victory.

== Births ==
=== January to June ===
- 3 January - Etienne-Michel Faillon, Roman Catholic historian (died 1870)
- 12 January - Eugène Lami, painter and lithographer (died 1890)
- 6 February - Achille Devéria, painter and lithographer (died 1857)
- 12 March - Louis Prosper Gachard, man of letters (died 1885)
- 25 March - Alexis Paulin Paris, scholar and author (died 1881)
- 13 April - Princess Elisabeth of Savoy-Carignan (died 1856)
- 5 May - Louis Christophe François Hachette, publisher (died 1864)
- 8 May - Armand Carrel, writer (died 1836)
- 12 May - Jean-Félix Adolphe Gambart, astronomer (died 1836)
- 30 May - Henri-Marie-Gaston Boisnormand de Bonnechose, Cardinal (died 1883)

=== July to December ===
- 14 July - Jean-Baptiste Dumas, chemist (died 1884)
- 31 July - Louis Viardot, writer, art historian and critic, theatrical figure, hispanophile and translator (died 1883)
- 28 July - Frédérick Lemaître, actor and playwright (died 1876)
- 12 August - Jean-Jacques Ampère, philologist and man of letters (died 1864)
- 26 August - Félix Archimède Pouchet, naturalist (died 1872)
- 12 September - Pierre Charles Fournier de Saint-Amant, chess master (died 1872)
- 22 September - Jean Louis Lassaigne, chemist (died 1859)
- 8 October - Jules Desnoyers, geologist and archaeologist (died 1887)
- 23 October - Henri Milne-Edwards, zoologist (died 1885)
- 25 October - Jacques Paul Migne, priest, theologian and publisher (died 1875)
- 1 November - Charles Antoine Lemaire, botanist and botanical author (died 1871)
- 17 November - Achille Fould, financier and politician (died 1867)
- 22 November - Jules Bastide, publicist (died 1879)
- 10 December - Philippe Ricord, physician (died 1889)
- 28 December - Jean-Pierre Dantan, sculptor (died 1869)

=== Full date unknown ===
- Auguste Belloc, photographer (died 1867)
- Ximénès Doudan, journalist (died 1872)
- Jean Louis Marie Eugène Durieu, photographer (died 1874)
- Charles Auguste Désiré Filon, historian (died 1875)
- Jacques-François Ochard, painter (died 1870)

== Deaths ==
=== January to March ===
- 1 January - Louis-Jean-Marie Daubenton, naturalist (born 1716)
- 9 January - Jean Étienne Championnet, General (born 1762)
- 18 February - Jean-Baptiste Perrée, Admiral (born 1761)
- 27 February - Princess Marie Adélaïde of France (born 1732)
- 16 March - Jean-Joseph Casot, Jesuit in Canada (born 1728)
- 29 March - Marc René, marquis de Montalembert, military engineer and writer (born 1714)
- March - Joseph de Guignes, orientalist and sinologist (born 1721)

=== April to June ===
- 19 April - Jean Antoine Marbot, general and politician (born 1754)
- 4 May - Armand, duc d'Aiguillon, nobleman (born 1750)
- 7 May - Jean-Baptiste Vallin de la Mothe, architect (born 1729)
- 10 May - Jacques Mallet du Pan, journalist (born 1749)
- 14 June - Louis Charles Antoine Desaix, General (born 1768)
- 14 June - Jean Baptiste Kléber, General (born 1753)
- 18 June - Francis V of Beauharnais, nobleman, soldier, politician, colonial governor and admiral (born 1714)
- 28 June - Théophile Corret de la Tour d'Auvergne, Military officer and antiquarian (born 1743)

=== July to December ===
- 2 July - Victor Louis, architect (born 1731)
- 12 August - Anne-Catherine de Ligniville, Madame Helvétius, maintained a renowned salon (born 1722)
- 18 August - Charles Louis L'Héritier de Brutelle, botanist and magistrate (born 1746)
- 13 September - Claude Martin, military officer in French and British armies (born 1735)
- 23 September - Dominique de La Rochefoucauld, Cardinal (born 1712)
- 27 September - Hyacinthe Jadin, composer (born 1776)
- 14 November - François Claude Amour, marquis de Bouillé, General (born 1739)
- December - Jean-Baptiste Audebert, artist and naturalist (born 1759)

=== Full date unknown ===
- François-Nicolas Martinet, engraver and naturalist (b. c.1760)
- André-Robert Andréa de Nerciat, novelist (born 1739)
