= 1796 in France =

- Decades: 1770s; 1780s; 1790s; 1800s; 1810s
- See also: History of France; Timeline of French history; List of years in France

Events from the year 1796 in France.

== Incumbents ==
- The French Directory

== Events ==
- 9 March - Widow Joséphine de Beauharnais marries General Napoléon Bonaparte.
- 12 April - Battle of Montenotte, French victory over Austria and Sardinian forces. Napoleon Bonaparte's first victory as an army commander.
- 13 April - Battle of Millesimo, French victory against Austrian and Sardinian forces.
- 14 April-15 April - Second Battle of Dego, French victory over Austro-Sardinian forces.
- 21 April - Battle of Mondovì, French victory over the Kingdom of Sardinia.
- 10 May - Battle of Lodi, French victory over Austria.
- 15 May - French troops take Milan.
- 5 July - Battle of Rastatt, French victory against Austria.
- 3-4 August - 2nd Battle of Lonato, French victory over Austria.
- 5 August - Battle of Castiglione, French victory over Austria.
- 11 August - Battle of Neresheim, French victory over Austria.
- 19 August - Second Treaty of San Ildefonso, signed by France and Spain, to ally against Great Britain.
- 24 August - Battle of Amberg, Austrian victory over French forces.
- 3 September - Battle of Würzburg, Austrian victory over France.
- 4 September - Battle of Rovereto, French victory against Austria.
- 8 September - Battle of Bassano, French victory over Austrian forces.
- 15 November-17 November - Battle of the Bridge of Arcole, French victory over Austria.

== Births ==
- 8 February - Barthélemy-Prosper Enfantin, social reformer (died 1864)
- 17 February - Louis Eugène Marie Bautain, philosopher and theologian (died 1867)
- 22 February - Alexis Bachelot, Roman Catholic priest and Prefect Apostolic of the Sandwich Islands (present Hawaii) (died 1837)
- 17 March - Jean-François Bayard, playwright (died 1853)
- 24 March - Zulma Carraud, children's author (died 1889)
- 31 March - Philippe Buchez, author and politician (died 1866)
- 1 June - Nicolas Léonard Sadi Carnot, physicist and military engineer (died 1832)
- 24 June - Charles Cousin-Montauban, Comte de Palikao, general and statesman (died 1878)
- 17 July - Jean-Baptiste-Camille Corot, painter (died 1875)
- 24 September - Antoine-Louis Barye, sculptor (died 1875)
- 6 November - Jean-Claude-Léonard Baveux, priest and missionary in Canada (died 1865)
- 21 November - Jean Zuléma Amussat, surgeon (died 1856)

=== Full date unknown ===
- Auguste-Marseille Barthélemy, satirical poet (died 1867)

== Deaths ==
- 1 January - Alexandre-Théophile Vandermonde, musician and chemist (born 1735)
- 8 January - Jean-Marie Collot d'Herbois, actor, dramatist, essayist, and revolutionary (born 1749)
- 23 February - Jean-Nicolas Stofflet, leader of Revolt in the Vendée (born 1751)
- 6 March - Guillaume Thomas François Raynal, writer (born 1711)
- 26 March - François de Charette, soldier and politician (born 1763)
- 1 May - Alexandre Guy Pingré, astronomer and naval geographer (born 1711)
- 30 July - Nicolas de Pigage, architect (born 1723)
- 21 September - François Séverin Marceau-Desgraviers, General (born 1769)
- 27 September - Jean-Bernard Gauthier de Murnan, General (born 1748)
- 16 October - Antoine-Joseph Pernety, writer (born 1716)

=== Full date unknown ===
- Jean Avisse, furniture maker (born 1723)
- Pierre-Marie-Jérôme Trésaguet, engineer (born 1716)
