= 1867 in France =

- Decades: 1840s; 1850s; 1860s; 1870s; 1880s
- See also: History of France; Timeline of French history; List of years in France

Events from the year 1867 in France.

== Incumbents ==
- Monarch – Napoleon III

== Events ==
- 1 January - Napoleon III announces liberal reforms.
- 13 January - French military mission to Japan (1867–68) arrives in Yokohama.
- February - Strike of bronzeworkers in Paris.
- 5 February - Second French intervention in Mexico: French troops evacuate from the capital; on 12 March the last French forces leave the country.
- 1 April–3 November - Exposition Universelle in Paris.
- 10 April - Victor Duruy introduces legislation for female education.
- 6 June - Polish nationalist émigré Antoni Berezowski makes an attempt on the lives of Tsar Alexander II of Russia and Emperor Napoleon III in the Bois de Boulogne.
- 7 June - Adolphe Dugléré prepares the Three Emperors Dinner.
- 25 June - The provinces of Châu Đốc, Hà Tiên and Vĩnh Long, ceded by Annam, are added to French Cochinchina.
- 24 July - Law on Sociétés anonymes.
- Pierre Michaux invents the front wheel-driven velocipede, the first mass-produced bicycle.

== Births ==
- 21 January - Maxime Weygand, military commander (died 1965)
- 14 April - René Boylesve, author (died 1926)
- 17 May - Georgette Agutte, painter (died 1922)
- 3 October - Pierre Bonnard, painter and printmaker (died 1947)

== Deaths ==
- 14 January - Jean Auguste Dominique Ingres, painter (born 1780)
- 17 January - Jacques Amand Eudes-Deslongchamps, naturalist and palaeontologist (born 1794)
- 31 May - Théophile-Jules Pelouze, chemist (born 1807)
- 11 June - Jean Pierre Pellissier, missionary to Southern Africa (born 1808)
- 7 July - François Ponsard, dramatist (born 1814)
- 31 July - Benoît Fourneyron, engineer, designed the first practical water turbine (born 1802)
- 23 August - Auguste-Marseille Barthélemy, satirical poet (born 1796)
- 31 August - Charles Baudelaire, poet, critic and translator (born 1821)
- 5 October - Achille Fould, financier and politician (born 1800)
- 15 October - Louis Eugène Marie Bautain, philosopher and theologian (born 1796)
- 28 November - Jean-Charles-Alphonse Avinain, "The Terror of Gonesse", serial killer, executed (born 1798)
- 6 December - Jean Pierre Flourens, physiologist (born 1794)
- 22 December - Jean-Victor Poncelet, engineer and mathematician (born 1788)
- Full date unknown - Auguste Belloc, photographer (born 1800)
