= 1794 in France =

- Decades: 1770s; 1780s; 1790s; 1800s; 1810s
- See also: History of France; Timeline of French history; List of years in France

The following lists events that happened during 1794 in the French Republic.

== Incumbents ==
- The Committee of Public Safety (de facto)
- The National Convention

== Events ==
=== January to March ===
- 4 February – The French Republic abolishes slavery.
- 15 February – Modern arrangement of Flag of France adopted.
- 26 February – Ventôse Decrees, proposed to confiscate the property of exiles and opponents of the Revolution, and redistribute it to the needy.
- 3 March – Ventôse Decrees.
- 23 March – British troops capture Martinique from the French.
- 27 March – The Marquis de Condorcet is arrested (while in disguise) in Clamart and imprisoned in Bourg-l'Égalité; two days later he is found dead in his cell.

=== April to June ===
- 5 April – Execution of Georges Danton.
- 19 April – Britain signs a treaty of alliance with Prussia and the Netherlands against France.
- 21 April – British troops seize Guadeloupe but the French regain control on 7 June.
- 30 April–1 May – War of the Pyrenees: Second Battle of Boulou, French victory against Spain and Portugal.
- 7 May – French Revolution: Robespierre establishes the Cult of the Supreme Being as the new state religion of the French First Republic.
- 8 May – French Revolution: Reign of Terror – Chemist Antoine Lavoisier is tried, convicted and executed by guillotine in Paris, on the same day as with 27 co-defendants also associated with the former ferme générale.
- 18 May – Battle of Tourcoing, French victory over Austrian and British forces.
- 22 May – Battle of Tournay, Coalition forces (Austrian, British, and Hanoverian troops) defeat the French.
- 1 June – Glorious First of June, French naval battle with the British; both sides claim victory.
- 4 June – British troops capture Port-au-Prince in Saint-Domingue from the French.
- 10 June – Law of 22 Prairial enacted, also known as the loi de la Grande Terreur.
- 17 June
  - The Anglo-Corsican Kingdom is established.
  - Battle of Mykonos: HMS Romney captures French frigate Sibylle.
- 26 June – Battle of Fleurus: French forces defeat the Austrians and their allies, leading to permanent loss of the Austrian Netherlands and destruction of the Dutch Republic. French use of an observation balloon marks the first participation of an aircraft in battle.

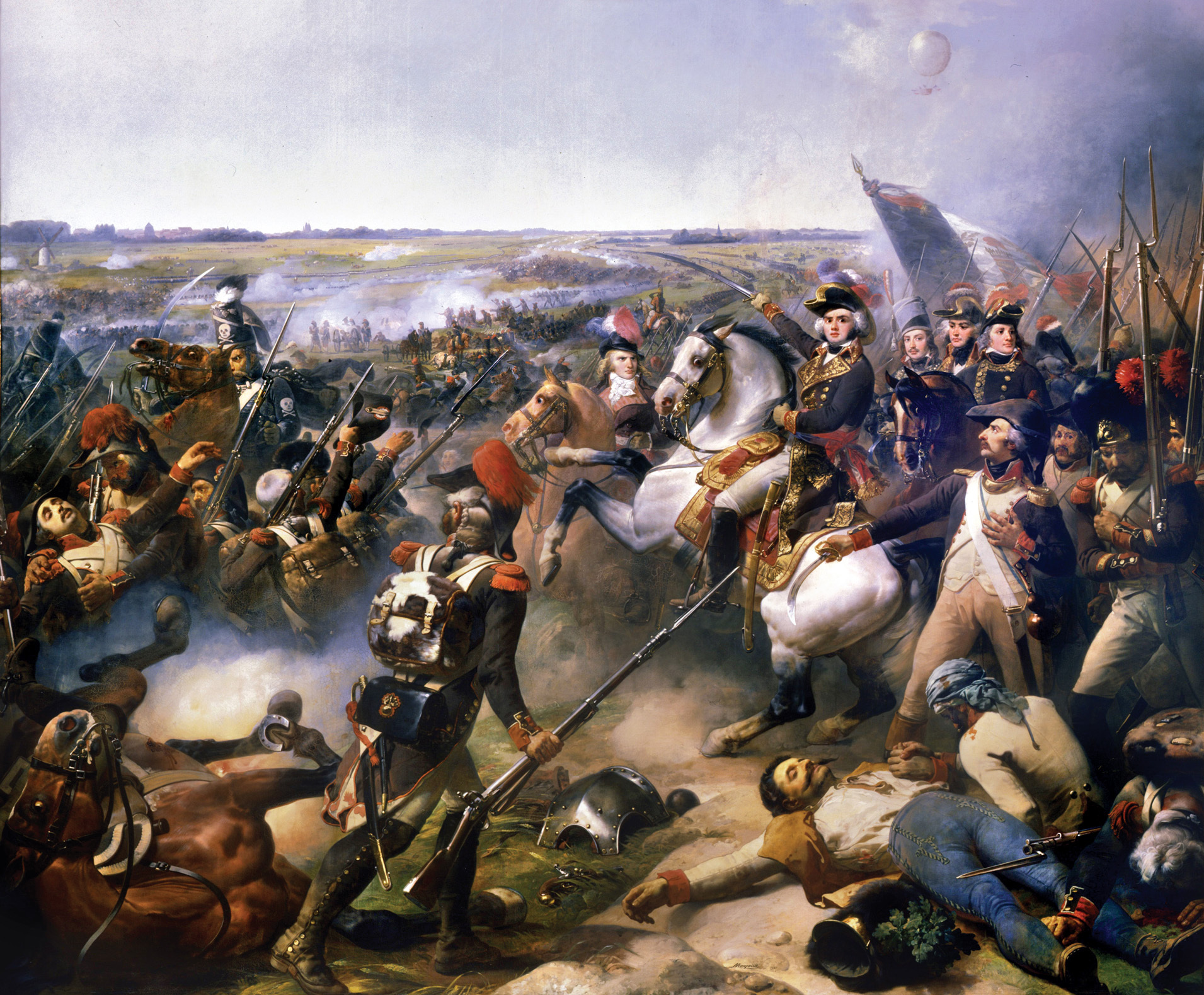
June 26: Battle of Fleurus

=== July to December ===
- 13 July – Battle of Trippstadt, French defeat Austrian, Prussian and Saxony forces.
- 17 July – The sixteen Carmelite Martyrs of Compiègne are executed 10 days prior to the end of the French Revolution's Reign of Terror.

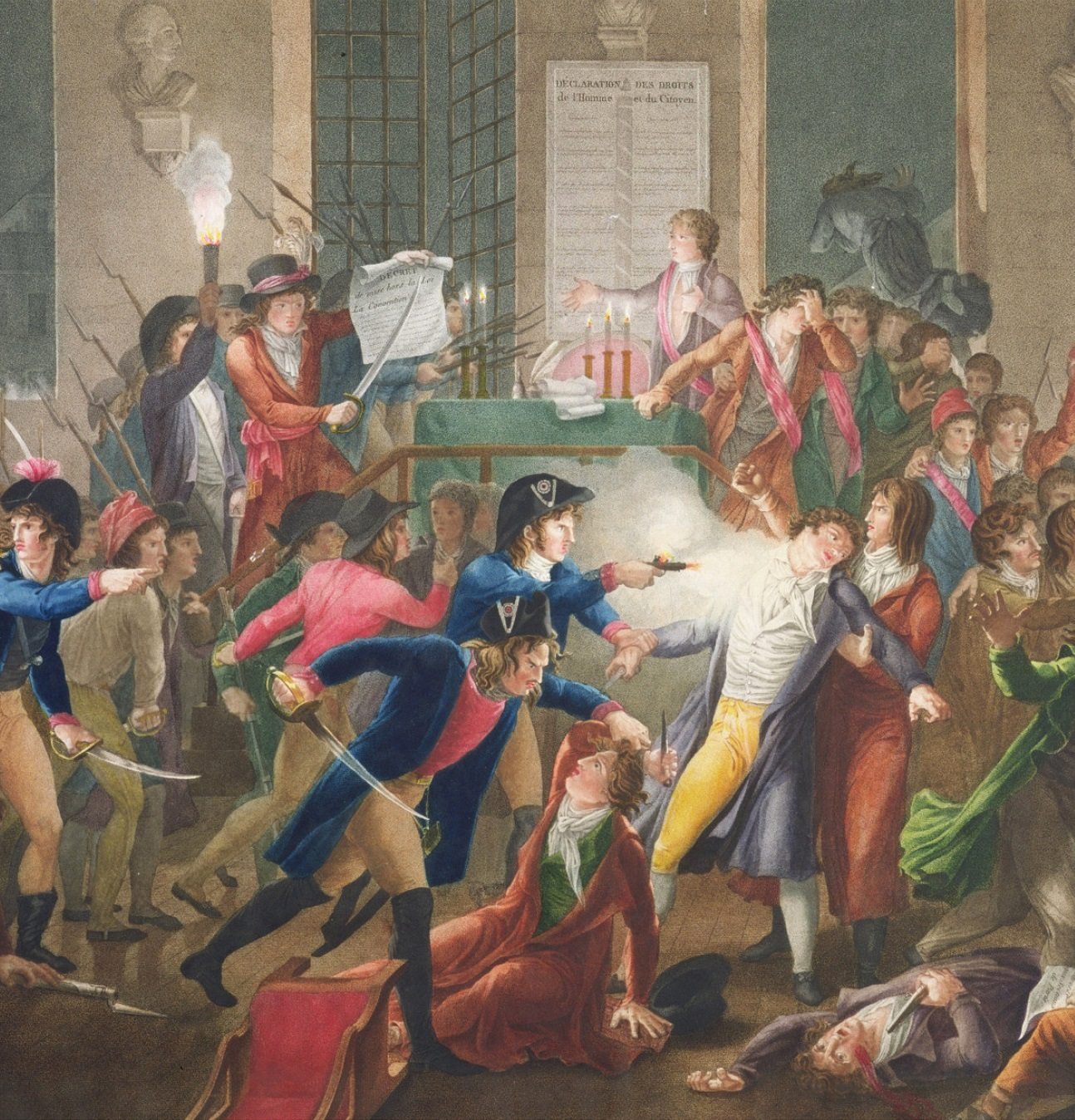
July 27: Robespierre and Saint-Just are arrested

- 27 July – Thermidorian Reaction begins against the excesses of the Reign of Terror. Robespierre and leaders of the Paris city government arrested.
- 28 July – Robespierre, Saint-Just, Georges Couthon, and others, including members of the Paris Commune are guillotined.
- 21 August – British troops capture Corsica following the bombardment by Nelson.
- 15 September – Battle of Boxtel.
- 2 October – Battle of Aldenhoven, French defeat Austrian forces.
- 17 November-20 November – War of the Pyrenees: Battle of Sant Llorenç de la Muga, French defeat Spanish forces.
- 22 November – Siege of Luxembourg. French siege of Austrian forces begins (ends in French victory June 1795).

=== Ongoing ===
- French Revolution
- French Revolutionary Wars
- First Coalition

=== Full date unknown ===
- Hospitals pass to ownership of the state.

== Births ==
=== January to March ===
- 10 January - Jean Philibert Damiron, philosopher (died 1862)
- 13 January - Prosper Garnot, surgeon and naturalist (died 1838)
- 17 January – Jacques Amand Eudes-Deslongchamps, naturalist and palaeontologist (died 1867)
- 25 January
  - Garcin de Tassy, orientalist (died 1878)
  - François-Vincent Raspail, chemist, physiologist and socialist (died 1878)
- 2 February – Étienne Arnal, actor (died 1872)
- 9 February – Jacques-François Ancelot, dramatist (died 1854)
- 5 March – Jacques Babinet, physicist, mathematician, and astronomer (died 1872)
- 19 March – Pierre-Médard Diard, naturalist and explorer (died 1863)
- 20 March – René-Primevère Lesson, surgeon and naturalist (died 1849)

=== April to June ===
- 4 April – Sabin Berthelot, naturalist and ethnologist (died 1880)
- 12 April – Germinal Pierre Dandelin, mathematician, soldier, and professor of[engineering (died 1847)
- 15 April – Jean Pierre Flourens, physiologist (died 1867)
- 26 April – Jean-Pierre Falret, psychiatrist (died 1870)
- 17 May – Frédéric Monod, Protestant pastor (died 1863)
- 29 May – Antoine Bussy, chemist (died 1882)
- 23 June – Louis Petitot, sculptor (died 1862)

=== July to December ===
- 29 July – Auguste Regnaud de Saint-Jean d'Angély, Marshal of France (died 1870)
- 9 August – Achille Valenciennes, zoologist (died 1865)
- 29 August – Léon Cogniet, painter (died 1880)
- 10 September – François Benoist, composer and organist (died 1878)
- 24 September – Jeanne Villepreux-Power, marine biologist (died 1871)
- September – Auguste Simon Paris, notary and entomologist (died 1869)
- 15 September – Rosine de Chabaud-Latour, French religious thinker and translator (died 1860)
- 22 October – Armand-Benjamin Caillau, Roman Catholic priest, a missionary and writer (died 1850)
- 6 November – Aimable Pélissier, Marshal of France (died 1864)
- 31 December – Pierre Adolphe Piorry, physician (died 1879)

=== Full date unknown ===
- Louis Adolphe le Doulcet, comte de Pontécoulant, soldier and musicologist (died 1882)
- Jean Baptiste Douville, traveller and writer (died 1837)
- Brutus de Villeroi, submarine engineer (died 1874)

== Deaths ==
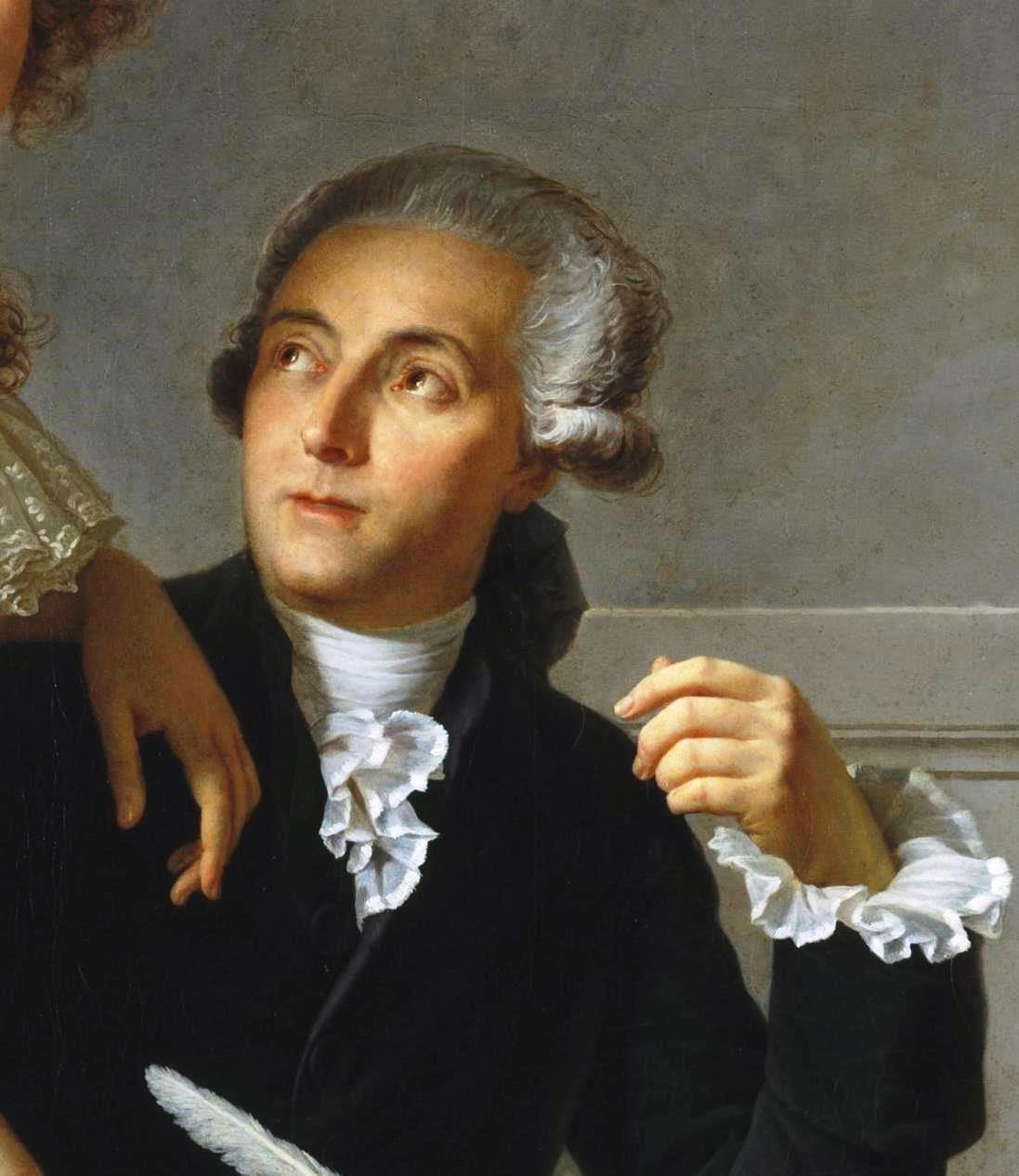
Antoine Lavoisier

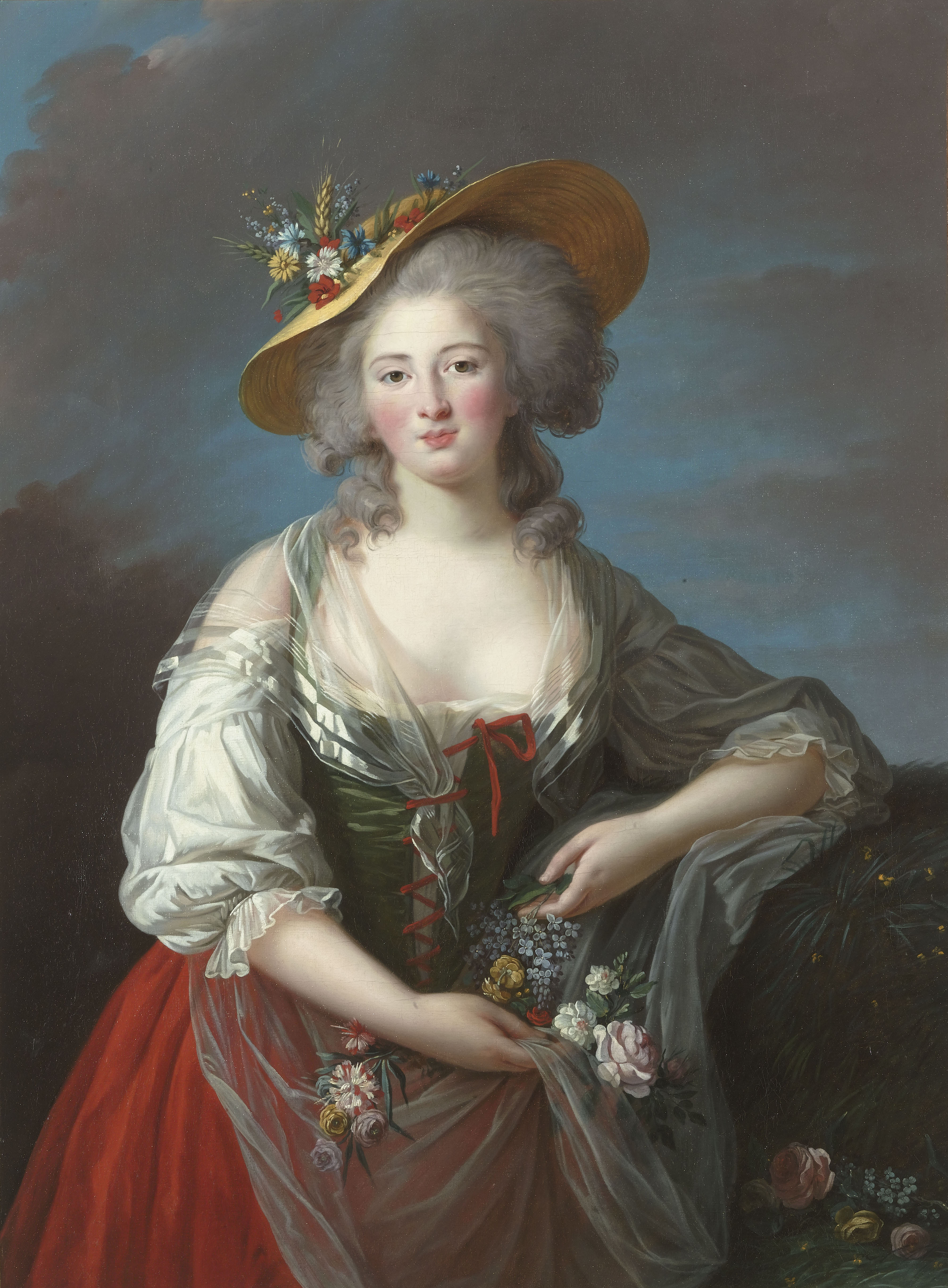
Élisabeth of France

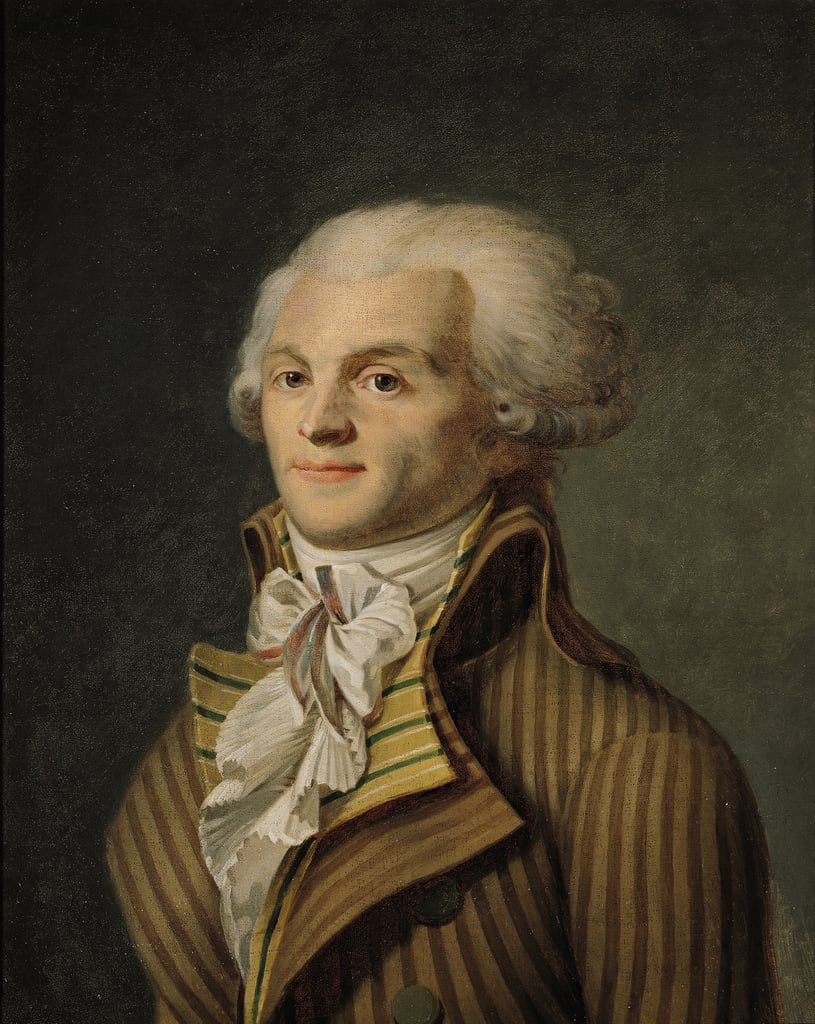
Maximilien Robespierre

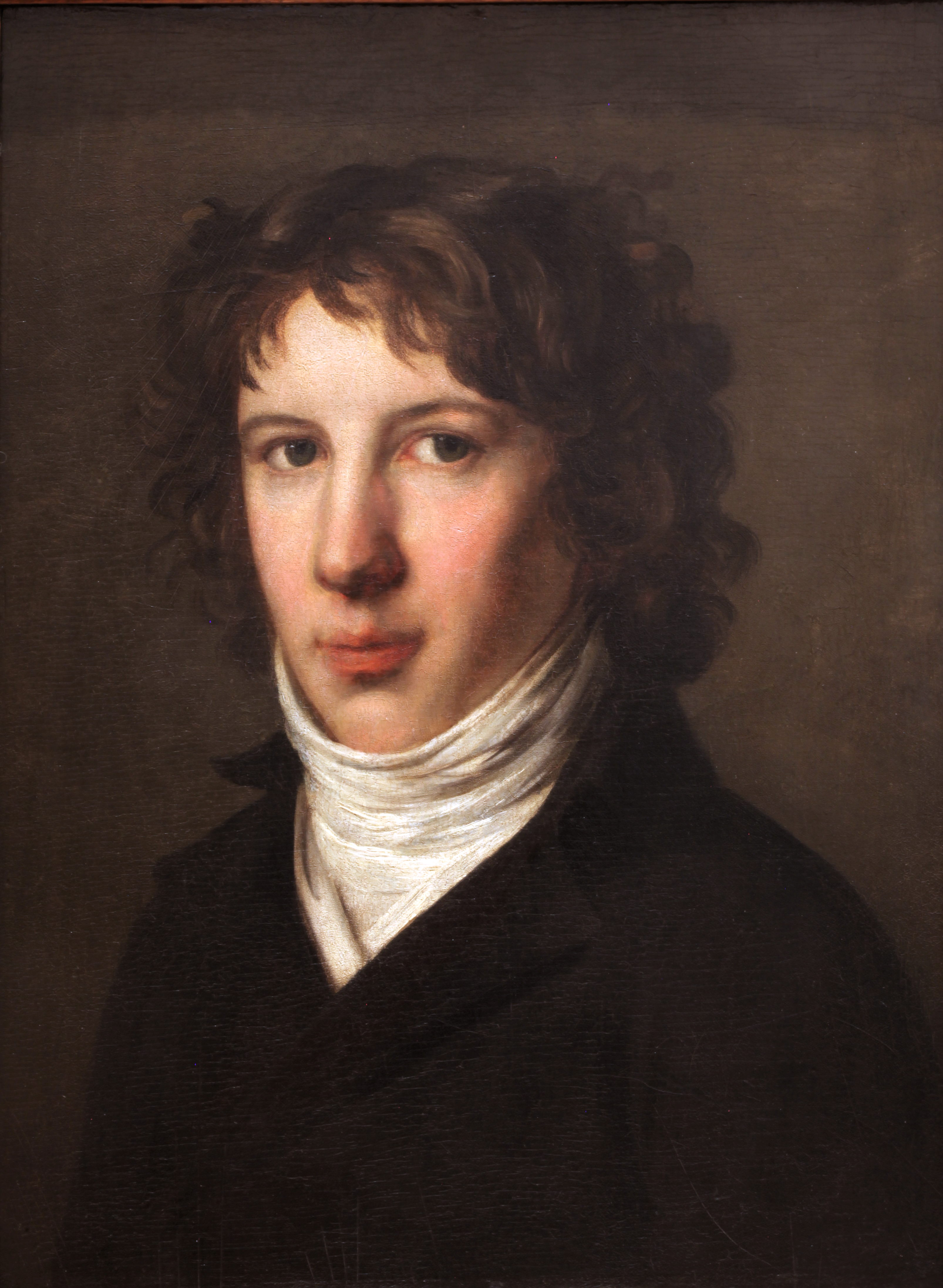
Louis Antoine de Saint-Just

=== January to March ===
- 4 January – Nicolas Luckner, Marshal of France (executed) (born 1722)
- 6 January
  - Pierre Bouchet, French physician (born 1752)
  - Maurice d'Elbée, French Revolutionary leader (executed) (born 1752)
- 28 January – Henri de la Rochejaquelein, youngest general of the Royalist Vendéan insurrection (born 1772)
- 10 February – Jacques Roux, French priest (born 1752)
- 24 March – Jacques Hébert, editor of radical newspaper Le Père Duchesne, executed (born 1757)
- 29 March – Marquis de Condorcet, philosopher, mathematician and political scientist (born 1743)

=== April to June ===
- 5 April – executions
  - Georges Danton, leading figure early in the French Revolution (born 1759)
  - Camille Desmoulins, journalist and leading figure in the French Revolution (born 1760)
  - Marie-Jean Hérault de Séchelles, Revolutionary politician (born 1759)
  - Fabre d'Églantine, actor, dramatist and Revolutionary politician (born 1750)
  - François Joseph Westermann, General and Revolutionary politician (born 1751)
- 13 April – executions
  - Pierre Gaspard Chaumette, Revolutionary politician (born 1763)
  - Lucile Duplessis, wife of Camille Desmoulins (born 1770)
- 23 April – Guillaume-Chrétien de Lamoignon de Malesherbes, statesman and Minister, executed (born 1721)
- 8 May – Antoine Lavoisier, nobleman and chemist, executed (born 1743)
- 10 May – Élisabeth of France, French princess (executed) (born 1764)
- 17 June – Marguerite-Élie Guadet, Royalist politician, executed (born 1753)
- 18 June – François Buzot, revolutionary politician (born 1760)
- 27 June – executions
  - Philippe de Noailles, duc de Mouchy, Marshal of France (born 1715)
  - Charles-Louis-Victor, prince de Broglie, soldier and politician (born 1756)

=== July to December ===
- 23 July – Alexandre, vicomte de Beauharnais, General and politician, executed (born 1760)
- 25 July – André Chénier, poet, executed (born 1762)
- 28 July – executions
  - Maximilien Robespierre, Revolutionary leader (born 1758)
  - Augustin Robespierre, Revolutionary politician (born 1763)
  - Louis Antoine de Saint-Just, Revolutionary leader (born 1767)
  - Jean-Baptiste de Lavalette, French general (executed) (born 1753)
  - François Hanriot, Revolutionary leader (born 1761)
- 11 September – Catherine Théot, French visionary (born 1716)
- 25 September – Paul Rabaut, Huguenot pastor (born 1718)
- 21 October – Antoine Petit, French physician (born 1722)
- 3 November – François-Joachim de Pierre de Bernis, Cardinal and statesman (born 1715)
- 16 December – Jean-Baptiste Carrier, revolutionary politician, executed (born 1756)
