= 1870 in France =

- Decades: 1850s; 1860s; 1870s; 1880s; 1890s
- See also: History of France; Timeline of French history; List of years in France

Events from the year 1870 in France.

== Incumbents ==
- Monarch – Napoleon III (abdicates 4 September, monarchy abolished)

== Events ==
- February - Denis Vrain-Lucas is sentenced to 2 years in prison for multiple forgery, in Paris.
- 20 April - Constitutional referendum reaffirms the status of the Second French Empire.
- 14 July - Ems Dispatch published, serving as a casus belli for war between France and Prussia.
- 15 July - French army mobilizes.
- 16 July - Corps législatif votes to declare war on Prussia.
- 19 July - France declares war on Prussia: opening of the Franco-Prussian War.
- 4 August - Battle of Wissembourg: Prussian forces overwhelm the French garrison at Wissembourg.
- 6 August
  - Battle of Spicheren, near Saarbrücken: Prussian victory.
  - Battle of Wörth: decisive Prussian victory.
- 14 August - Battle of Borny-Colombey: Prussian victory; French retreat upon Metz.
- 15 August - Siege of Strasbourg begins.
- 16 August - Battle of Mars-la-Tour: Prussian victory.
- 18 August - Battle of Gravelotte: Prussian victory.
- 30 August - Battle of Beaumont: Prussian victory.
- 31 August - Battle of Noiseville: Prussian victory.
- 1–2 September - Battle of Sedan: decisive Prussian victory. Napoleon III surrenders himself and the entire Army of Châlons and declares the Second Empire dissolved.
- 3 September - Siege of Metz begins with French forces besieged.
- 4 September - Third Republic declared in Paris. Government of National Defense established. Empress Eugenie flees to England with her son.
- 19 September - Siege of Paris begins.
- 27–30 September - Battle of Le Bourget, part of the siege of Paris: Prussian victory.
- 28 September - Siege of Strasbourg ends with French surrender.
- 30 September - Battle of Chevilly, part of the siege of Paris: Prussian victory.
- 8 October - Leon Michel Gambetta escapes besieged Paris in a hot-air balloon.
- 18 October - Battle of Bellevue, near Metz: Prussian victory.
- 23 October - Siege of Metz ends with French surrender.
- 3 November - Siege of Belfort begins with French troops besieged.
- 9 November - Battle of Coulmiers: French victory over Bavarian forces.
- 11 November - French retake Orléans.
- 27 November - Battle of Amiens: Prussian victory.
- 28 November - Battle of Beaune-la-Rolande: Prussian victory.
- 29 November - Battle of Villiers, largest of the French sorties from besieged Paris, begins.
- 2 December - Battle of Loigny-Poupry, Prussian victory.
- 3 December - Battle of Villiers ends with Prussian victory.
- 3–4 December - Second Battle of Orléans: Prussians recapture Orléans.
- 23–24 December - Battle of Hallue results in stalemate.

== Arts and literature ==
- February - Sculptor Aimé Millet is appointed professor at the École des Arts décoratifs.
- 25 May - Léo Delibes' ballet Coppélia debuts at the Théâtre Impérial de l'Opéra at the Salle Le Peletier in Paris.
- 28 June - Claude Monet marries his mistress and model Camille Doncieux in Paris; Gustave Courbet is a witness.

== Births ==
- 25 January - Henry Bordeaux, writer and lawyer (died 1963)
- 28 April - Frédéric Justin Collet, pathologist and otolaryngologist (died 1966)
- 20 June - Georges Dufrénoy, post-impressionist painter (died 1943)
- 27 July - Hilaire Belloc, French-born English writer (died 1953 in the United Kingdom)
- 24 September - Georges Claude, engineer, chemist and inventor (died 1960)
- 30 September - Jean Baptiste Perrin, physicist and Nobel laureate (died 1942)
- 8 October - Louis Vierne, organist and composer (died 1937)
- 10 December - Mary Bonaparte, eldest daughter of Prince Napoléon Bonaparte of Canino (died 1947)

== Deaths ==
=== January to June ===
- 19 January - Jean-Baptiste Troppmann, spree killer, executed (born 1849)
- 1 February - Auguste Regnaud de Saint-Jean d'Angély, Marshal of France (born 1794)
- 19 February - Nathaniel de Rothschild, founder of the wine-making branch of the Rothschild family (born 1812)
- 20 June - Jules de Goncourt, writer (born 1830)

=== July to December ===
- 15 August - Ardant du Picq, Colonel and military theorist (born 1819)
- 2 September - Charles Joseph, comte de Flahaut, general and statesman (born 1785)
- 23 September - Prosper Mérimée, dramatist, historian and archaeologist (born 1803)
- 25 October - Etienne-Michel Faillon, Roman Catholic historian (born 1800)
- 28 October - Jean-Pierre Falret, psychiatrist (born 1794)
- 29 October - Jules Baroche, statesman and Minister (born 1802)
- 24 November - Comte de Lautréamont, poet (born 1846 in Uruguay)
- 28 November - Frédéric Bazille, painter, killed in action (born 1841)
- 5 December - Alexandre Dumas, père, writer (born 1802)
- 26 December - Marie Dominique Bouix, Jesuit canon lawyer (born 1808)

=== Full date unknown ===
- Jacques-François Ochard, painter (born 1800)
