= Belloc (surname) =

Belloc is a surname. Notable people with this surname include:

- Auguste Belloc (1800–1867), French erotic photographer
- Hilaire Belloc (1870–1953), British-French writer
- Jean-Hilaire Belloc (1786–1866), French painter
- Louise Swanton Belloc (1796–1881), French translator and early feminist
- Marie Belloc Lowndes (1868–1947), English novelist and sister of Hilaire

== Fictional characters ==
- Elaine Belloc, fictional character in the DC/Vertigo Comics series Lucifer

== See also ==
- Belloc
