= Hégésippe Moreau =

French lyric poet (1810–1838)

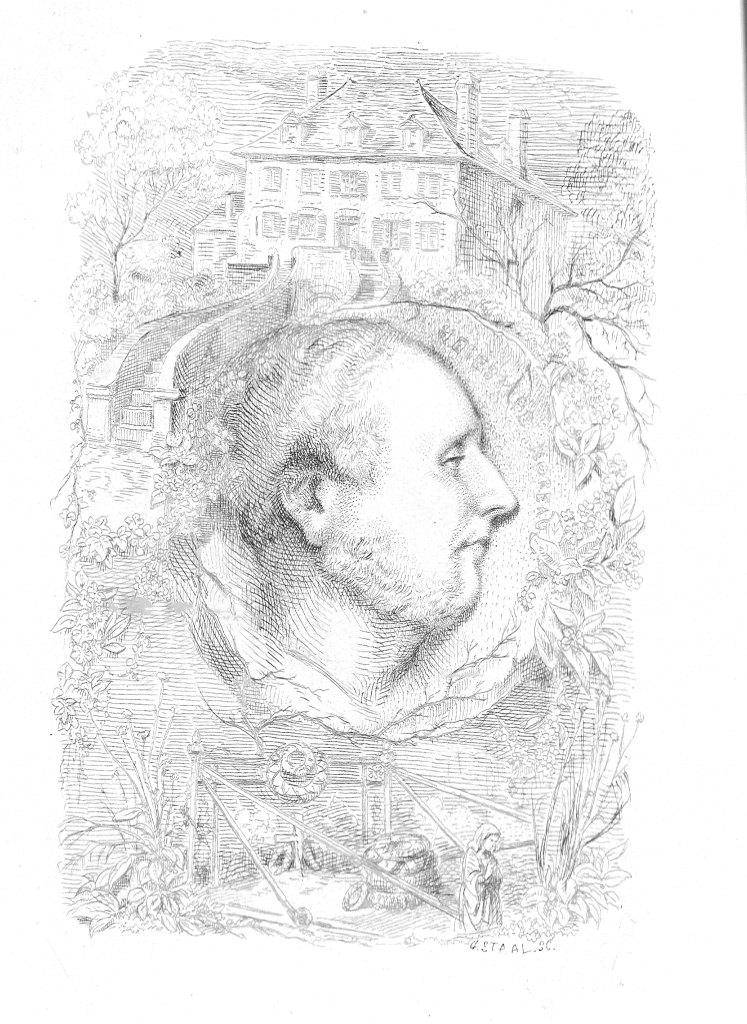
A portrait painting of Hégésippe Moreau

Hégésippe Moreau (born Pierre-Jacques Roulliot; April 8, 1810 – December 20, 1838) was a French lyric poet. From birth, he was called by the last name of his biological father (Moreau) and took on the pseudonym Hégésippe when he first began publishing poetry in 1829. In the imagination of the French romantics and the 19th century public, the difficulties of Hégésippe Moreau's life and his untimely death made him a romantic equivalent of the earlier poets Thomas Chatterton, Nicolas Joseph Laurent Gilbert and Jacques Clinchamps de Malfilâtre. This romantic myth was solidified by the publication of his complete works, together with the works of Gilbert and a list of poets who died of hunger, in 1856; the 1860 edition of his works included an important biographical preface by Sainte-Beuve.

== Life and career ==
Moreau was born and died in Paris. In his infancy, his parents, who were poor, migrated to Provins. His father, Claude-François Moreau, born in Poligny Jura, took a post of professor in the collège of Provins (Seine-et-Marne) in 1810, but died of tuberculosis on May 16, 1814. Hégésippe's mother Marie Roulliot (born Jeanne-Marie Rouillot, March 12, 1774 in Cluny Saône-et-Loire) went into the service of a Madame Guérard in Provins, and this lady would become Hégésippe's benefactor. Hégésippe began his studies in Provins, and then, when the Guérard family moved to the country, was placed in the seminary of Meaux (Seine-et-Marne), and later in the seminary of Avon (near Fontainebleau). His mother died of tuberculosis on February 5, 1823, while Hégésippe was a student at Avon.

When he left Avon in 1828 (in his preface to the collected works of Hégésippe, Sainte-Beuve informs us that Hégésippe was an excellent student of classical literature and that he had a talent for Latin versification), he entered into apprenticeship as a proofreader for a publisher in Provins, Monsieur Lebeau—in his works, Hégésippe refers to the daughter of M. Lebeau as his "sister" and he dedicated his short prose tales to her. Upon the passage of Charles X through Provins in 1828, Sainte-Beuve informs us, Moreau wrote his patriotic poem Vive le roi !.

Hégésippe Moreau went to Paris before 1830. On the advice of M. Lebrun, he sent a copy of his Epistle on Printing to M. Firmin Didot and he was hired by the Didot publishing house, which was located on the rue Jacob, but left this employer shortly after. He took part in the July Revolution of 1830, worked briefly as a tutor (maître d’étude), and began to lead the Bohemian life. Shortly after the July Revolution, M. Lebrun was named director of the Imprimerie royale (Royal Publishing House) and tried to hire Hégésippe, but the twenty-year-old poet had already abandoned this career. In Paris, he was habitually houseless, and exposed himself to the dangers of a cholera hospital in the great epidemic of 1832 simply to obtain shelter and food.

In 1833, ailing, he returned to Madame Guérard's in Provins to recuperate and began a kind of satirical serial called Diogène (named after the Greek Cynic Diogenes) modelled on the journal La Némésis published by Auguste-Marseille Barthélemy, but a lack of readership in the provincial town and creative rivalties made the venture a failure. Having alienated several of his supporters and participated in a duel, Hégésippe returned to Paris.

From 1834 to 1838, he lived in great misery in Paris, and entirely ruined in his health, he was forced to take lodgings in a refuge of the destitute (Hôpital de la Charité). It was only just before his death that he succeeded in getting his collected poems published, selling the copyright for 4 sterling and 80 copies of the book. This volume, Myosotis (1838), was received not unfavourably, but the author's death of tuberculosis on 20 December 1838 created an interest in it which was proportionately excessive.

== Writings ==
Moreau's work has a strong note of imitation from André Chénier, Pierre-Jean de Béranger and Auguste-Marseille Barthelemy. His earlier songs are distinguished from those of his model, Béranger, chiefly by their elegiac note. Some of his poems, such as the elegy La Voulsie (1837) and the charming romance La Fermire (1835), have great sweetness and show incontestable poetic power. Moreau wrote some charming prose stories: Le Gui de chene, La Souris blanche, etc.

Charles Baudelaire however saw Moreau's work as pompous and derivative.

=== Poetry collections ===
- Le Myosotis, petits contes et petits vers; Desessart, Paris, 1838. Choice of poems and tales, including Contes à ma Sœur.
- Œuvres de Hégésippe Moreau, preface de Sainte-Beuve, Paris, 1860. Available on Gallica (in an incomplete version; the poem « Dix-huit ans » is missing)
- Contes à ma Sœur; Petite Collection rose, Librairie A. Lemerre, Paris (no date), which includes :
  - Le Gui de Chêne,
  - La Souris blanche,
  - Les Petits Souliers,
  - Thérèse Sureau,
  - Le Neveu de la Fruitière.
- Contes à ma Sœur, notes by E. Gœpp; A. Lemerre, Paris; 1889. Including :
  - Contes à ma Sœur
    - Le Gui de Chêne,
    - La Souris blanche,
    - Les Petits Souliers,
    - Thérèse Sureau,
    - Le Neveu de la Fruitière.
  - Poésies
    - Un Souvenir à l'Hôpital,
    - La Fermière,
    - La Mort d'une Cousine de sept ans,
    - La Voulzie

=== Tales ===
- Le Neveu de la fruitière, originally published in Journal des Enfants in 1836
- M; Scribe à l’Académie, originally published in La Psyché in January 1836
- Jeanne d’Arc, originally published in Journal des Demoiselles in May 1836
- Les petits Souliers , originally published in Journal des demoiselles in April 1836
- La Dame de cœur, originally published in Le petit Courrier des Dames in September 1836
- Le Gui de chêne, originally published in Journal des demoiselles in January 1837
- Thérèse Sureau, originally published in la Psyché in January 1837
- La Souris blanche, originally published in Journal des demoiselles in January 1837

The French version of Wikisource has copies of his works available.
