= 1866 in France =

- Decades: 1840s; 1850s; 1860s; 1870s; 1880s
- See also: History of France; Timeline of French history; List of years in France

Events from the year 1866 in France.

== Events ==
- 31 May - Napoleon III announces the withdrawal of French forces in the French intervention in Mexico.
- 26 July - French evacuate Monterrey.
- 5 August - French evacuate Saltillo.
- 14 October - French troops land at Ganghwa Island, Korea as part of French Campaign against Korea for the execution of French Jesuit priests. It is the first military contact between Korea and a Western force.

== Arts and literature ==
- 31 October - Jacques Offenbach's opéra bouffe La Vie parisienne is premiered at the Théâtre du Palais-Royal in Paris.

== Births ==
- 17 January - Joseph Bernard, sculptor (died 1931)
- 29 January - Romain Rolland, writer, recipient of Nobel Prize in Literature (died 1944)
- 19 February - Louis-Henri Foreau, painter (died 1938)
- 17 May - Erik Satie, composer and pianist (died 1925)
- 23 May - Ellen Richards Ridgway, American golfer (died 1934)
- 6 July - Charles Mangin, general during World War I (died 1925)
- 13 July - La Goulue, dancer (died 1929)
- 4 August - Maurice Schutz, actor (died 1955)
- 7 September - Tristan Bernard, playwright, novelist, journalist and lawyer (died 1947)
- 21 September - Charles Nicolle, bacteriologist, recipient of Nobel Prize in Physiology or Medicine, 1928 (died 1936)

== Deaths ==
- 8 March - Siméon-François Berneux, Roman Catholic missionary killed in Korea (born 1814).
- 11 August - Philippe Buchez, author and politician (born 1796).
