= 1865 in France =

- Decades: 1840s; 1850s; 1860s; 1870s; 1880s
- See also: History of France; Timeline of French history; List of years in France

The following lists events that happened during 1865 in the French Empire.

== Incumbents ==
- Monarch – Napoleon III

== Events ==
- 1 January - The French government suppresses promulgation of the Papal "Syllabus of Errors" from the pulpit.
- 3 November - Opening of the first Printemps department store, in Paris.
- 6 December - Treaty with Monaco.
- Count Alexandre Colonna-Walewski, son of Napoleon, becomes President of the Corps législatif.
- Flag reformed.

== Arts and literature ==
- 1 January - Hector Berlioz finishes his memoirs.
- Édouard Manet's painting Olympia is first exhibited, at the Salon (Paris), and causes controversy.
- Jean-François Millet's painting The Angelus (L'Angélus) is first exhibited and becomes very popular in France.

== Births ==
- 20 January - Yvette Guilbert, singer and actress (died 1944)
- 5 March - Clémentine Delait, bearded lady (died 1939)
- 9 June - Albéric Magnard, composer (died 1914)
- 1 October - Paul Dukas, composer and teacher (died 1935)
- 8 December - Jacques Hadamard, mathematician (died 1963)

== Deaths ==
- 19 January - Pierre-Joseph Proudhon, political philosopher (born 1809)
- 16 February - Louis Pierre Gratiolet, anatomist and zoologist (born 1815)
- 13 April - Achille Valenciennes, zoologist (born 1794)
- 18 April - Léon Jean Marie Dufour, medical doctor and naturalist (born 1780)
- 30 March - Gustave de Beaumont, magistrate, prison reformer and travel companion to Alexis de Tocqueville (born 1802)
- 18 November – Joseph Déjacque, anarcho-communist poet and writer (born 1821).
- 21 November - Jean-Claude-Léonard Baveux, priest and missionary in Canada (born 1796)
- Full date unknown - César Lecat de Bazancourt, military historian (born 1810)
