= 1803 in France =

- Decades: 1780s; 1790s; 1800s; 1810s; 1820s
- See also: History of France; Timeline of French history; List of years in France

Events from the year 1803 in France.

== Incumbents ==
- The French Consulate

== Events ==
- 30 January
  - Monroe and Livingston sail for Paris to discuss, and possibly buy, New Orleans: they end completing the Louisiana Purchase.
  - Napoleon authorizes the celebration of a Joan of Arc feast in Orléans on 8 May.
- 30 April - Louisiana Purchase made by the United States from France.
- May - The First Consul of France Citizen Bonaparte begins making preparations to invade England.
- 18 May - The United Kingdom redeclares war on France, after French refuse to withdraw from Dutch territory.
- 5 July - Convention of Artlenburg, the surrender of the Electorate of Hanover to Napoleon's army.
- 18 November - Haitian Revolution: Battle of Vertières, decisive Haitian victory over the French colonial army.

== Births ==
=== January to June ===
- 16 February - Louis-Antoine Garnier-Pagès, politician (died 1878)
- 3 March - Alexandre-Gabriel Decamps, painter (died 1860)
- 15 March - Alexandre Boreau, pharmacist and botanist (died 1875)
- 7 April - Flora Tristan, socialist writer and activist (died 1844)
- 24 April - Jean Étienne Bercé, entomologist (died 1879)
- 24 May - Charles Lucien Bonaparte, naturalist and ornithologist (died 1857)

=== July to December ===
- 22 July - Eugène Isabey, painter, draftsman, and printmaker (died 1886)
- 24 July - Adolphe Adam, composer and music critic (died 1856)
- 8 September - Léon Faucher, politician and economist (died 1854)
- 12 September - Julien Auguste Pélage Brizeux, poet (died 1858)
- 13 September - Jean Ignace Isidore Gérard, caricaturist (died 1847)
- 23 September - Jacques Crétineau-Joly, journalist and historian (died 1875)
- 28 September - Ferdinand Berthier, deaf educator, intellectual and political organiser (died 1886)
- 28 September - Prosper Mérimée, dramatist, historian and archaeologist (died 1870)
- 11 December - Hector Berlioz, composer (died 1869)
- 24 December - Jean-Rémy Bessieux, founder of Roman Catholic mission in Gabon and first Bishop there (died 1876)

=== Full date unknown ===
- Hélène Jégado, domestic servant and serial killer, executed (died 1852)

== Deaths ==
=== January to June ===
- 18 January - Sylvain Maréchal, essayist, poet and philosopher (born 1750)
- 29 January - La Clairon, actress (born 1723)
- 9 February - Jean François de Saint-Lambert, poet (born 1716)
- 11 February - Jean-François de La Harpe, playwright, writer and critic (born 1739)
- 16 February - Louis René Édouard, cardinal de Rohan, Cardinal (born 1734)
- 20 February - Marie Dumesnil, actress (born 1713)
- 4 March - Madame de Marsan, Royal children's governess (born 1720)
- 24 April - Adélaïde Labille-Guiard, painter (born 1749)
- April - Louis François Antoine Arbogast, mathematician (born 1759)
- 29 May - Louis-Antoine Caraccioli, writer, poet, historian and biographer (born 1719)
- 6 June - Louis Gallodier, ballet dancer and choreographer (b. c1734)

=== July to December ===
- 16 August - Gabriel Sénac de Meilhan, writer (born 1736)
- 5 September
  - François Devienne, composer and flautist (born 1759)
  - Pierre Choderlos de Laclos, General and novelist (born 1741)
- 7 October - Pierre Vachon, composer (born 1731)
- 12 October - Jacques Gamelin, painter and engraver (born 1738)
- 7 November - Pierre Brugière, priest and Jansenist (born 1730)
- 27 November - Antoine Guenée, priest and Christian apologist (born 1717)
