= 1873 in France =

- Decades: 1850s; 1860s; 1870s; 1880s; 1890s
- See also: History of France; Timeline of French history; List of years in France

Events from the year 1873 in France.

== Incumbents ==
- President: Adolphe Thiers (until 24 May), Patrice de MacMahon, Duke of Magenta (starting 24 May)
- President of the Council of Ministers: Jules Armand Dufaure (until 24 May), Albert, duc de Broglie (starting 24 May)

== Events ==
- 16 September – German troops leave France upon completion of payment of indemnity for Franco-Prussian War.
- 27 October - Henry, Count of Chambord, refuses to be crowned 'King Henry V of France' until France abandons its tricolour and returns to the old Bourbon flag.
- 21 December – Francis Garnier is attacked outside Hanoi by Black Flag mercenaries fighting for the Vietnamese.

== Literature ==
- Alphonse Daudet - Robert Helmont
- Jules Verne - Le Pays des fourrures
- Émile Zola - Le Ventre de Paris

== Music ==
- Georges Bizet - Jeux d'enfants (Petite Suite)
- Jules Massenet
  - Marie-Magdeleine
  - Les Érinnyes
- Jacques Offenbach
  - Pomme d'api
  - La jolie parfumeuse

== Births ==
- 2 January – Thérèse de Lisieux, Roman Catholic Carmelite nun, canonised as a saint (died 1897)
- 28 January – Colette, writer (died 1954)
- 2 February – Maurice Tourneur, film director and screenwriter (died 1961)
- 19 February – Louis Feuillade, film director (died 1925)
- 17 May – Henri Barbusse, novelist, journalist and communist (died 1935)
- 28 June – Alexis Carrel, surgeon and biologist, recipient of the Nobel Prize in Physiology or Medicine (died 1944)
- 1 July – Alice Guy-Blaché, pioneer filmmaker, first female film director (died 1968 in the United States)
- 4 August –
  - Joseph Paul-Boncour, politician (died 1972)
  - Alice Pruvot-Fol, malacologist (died 1972)
- 14 August
  - Madeleine Fournier-Sarlovèze, golfer (died 1962)
  - Alice Jouenne educator, socialist activist, and writer (died 1954)
- 8 September – Alfred Jarry, playwright and novelist (died 1907)
- 25 November – Pierre Lacau, Egyptologist and philologist (died 1963)

== Deaths ==
- 10 January – Napoleon III of France, first President of the French Republic and only emperor of the Second French Empire (born 1808)
- 23 January – Louis Gustave Ricard, painter (born 1823)
- 1 April – Marc Girardin, politician and man of letters (born 1801)
- 16 April – Joseph Albert Alexandre Glatigny, poet (born 1839)
- 4 May – Charles Rigault de Genouilly, Admiral (born 1807)
- 16 June – Eugène Flachat, civil engineer (born 1802)
- 18 July – Philarète Chasles, critic and man of letters (born 1798)
- 8 August – Antoine Chintreuil, painter (born 1814)
- 7 September – Jules Verreaux, botanist and ornithologist (born 1807)
- 21 September – Auguste Nélaton, physician and surgeon (born 1807)
- 23 September – Jean Chacornac, astronomer (born 1823)
