= 1799 in France =

- Decades: 1770s; 1780s; 1790s; 1800s; 1810s
- See also: History of France; Timeline of French history; List of years in France

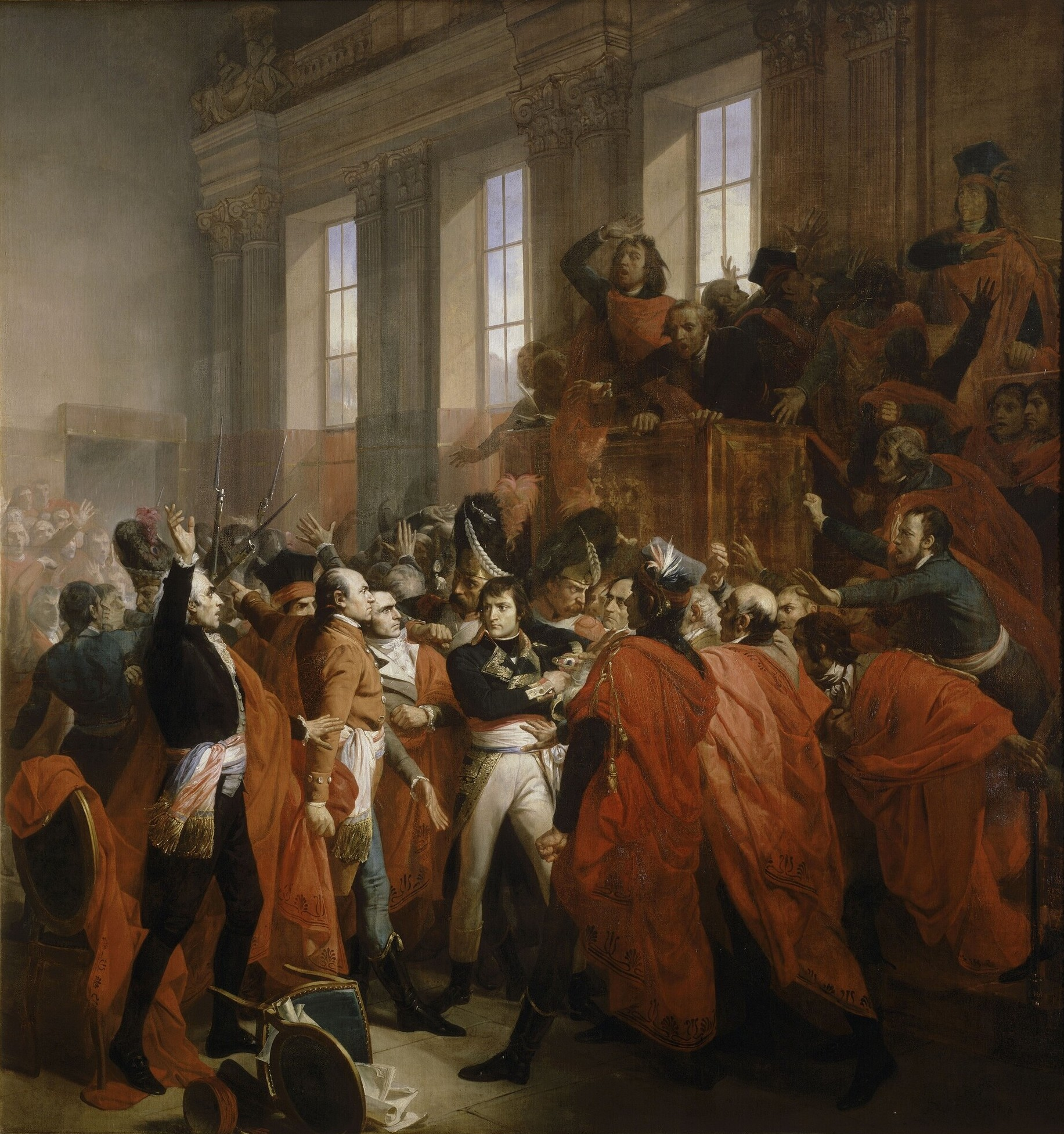
Napoleon Bonaparte seizes power during the Coup of 18 Brumaire.

This article lists events from the year 1799 in France

== Incumbents ==
- Until 10 November – the French Directory – five Directors
- From 10 November – the French Consulate – three consuls

== Events ==
- The French Revolutionary Wars resumed, with a number of campaigns
- 9 November – Coup of 18 Brumaire
- 10 November – disbanding of the French Directory, and establishment of the French Consulate

== Births ==
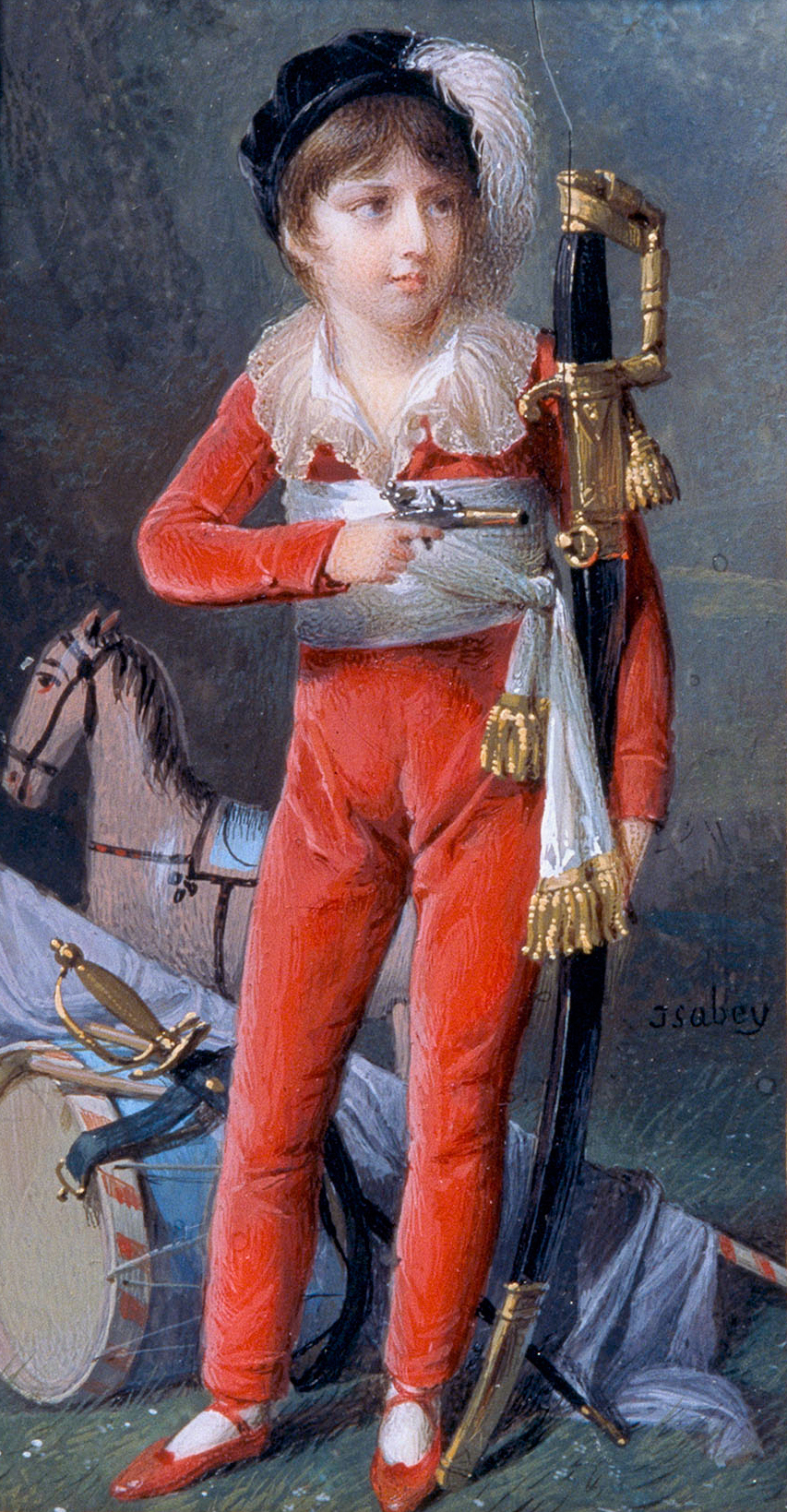
Oscar I of Sweden was born in Paris.

- 20 May – Honoré de Balzac, novelist and playwright (died 1850)
- 8 July – Oscar I of Sweden, king of Sweden and Norway (died 1859)
- 9 July – Théophile Tilmant, violinist (died 1878)

== Deaths ==
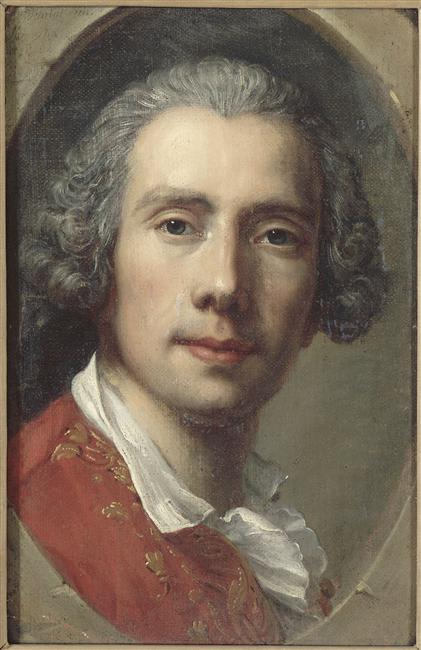
Self portrait, Guillaume Voiriot.

- 19 February – Jean-Charles de Borda, mathematician (born 1733)
- 5 April – Honoré Fragonard, anatomist (born 1732)
- 28 April – François Giroust, composer (born 1737)
- 9 May – Claude Balbastre, composer (born 1724)
- 18 May – Pierre Beaumarchais, playwright, watchmaker, satirist and revolutionary (born 1732)
- 31 May – Pierre Charles Le Monnier, astronomer (born 1715)
- 27 June 27 – Élisabeth Jacquet de La Guerre, harpsichordist and composer (b. 1665)
- 7 September – Louis-Guillaume Le Monnier, scientist (born 1717)
- 17 October – Louis Claude Cadet de Gassicourt, chemist (born 1731)
- 9 December – Guillaume Voiriot, portrait painter (born 1712)
- 18 December – Jean-Étienne Montucla, mathematician (born 1725)
- 31 December – Louis-Jean-Marie Daubenton, naturalist (born 1716)
- 31 December – Jean-François Marmontel, historian (born 1723)

== See also ==
Media related to 1799 in France at Wikimedia Commons
