= Joseph Jean Baptiste Xavier Fournet =

French geologist (1801–1869)

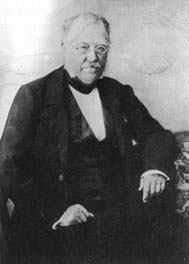
- Jean-Baptiste Fournet
- Born: May 15, 1801; Strasbourg
- Died: January 8, 1869 (aged 67); Lyon
- Education: École des Mines
- Scientific career
- Fields: geology, metallurgy
- Workplaces: University of Lyon

Joseph Jean Baptiste Xavier Fournet (May 15, 1801 – January 8, 1869), French geologist and metallurgist, was born at Strasbourg.

He was educated at the École des Mines in Paris, and after considerable experience as a mining engineer he was in 1834 appointed professor of geology at Lyon.

He was a man of wide knowledge and extensive research, and wrote memoirs on chemical and mineralogical subjects, on eruptive rocks, on the structure of the Jura Mountains, the metamorphism of the Western Alps, on the formation of oolitic limestones, on kaolinization and on metalliferous veins. On metallurgical subjects he also was an acknowledged authority; and he published observations on the order of sulphurability of metals (loi de Fournet).

He died in Lyon. His chief publications were: Études sur les dépôts métallifères (Paris, 1834); Histoire de la dolomie (Lyon, 1847); De l'extension des terrains houillers (1855); and Géologie lyonnaise (Lyon, 1861).
