= Jean Avisse =

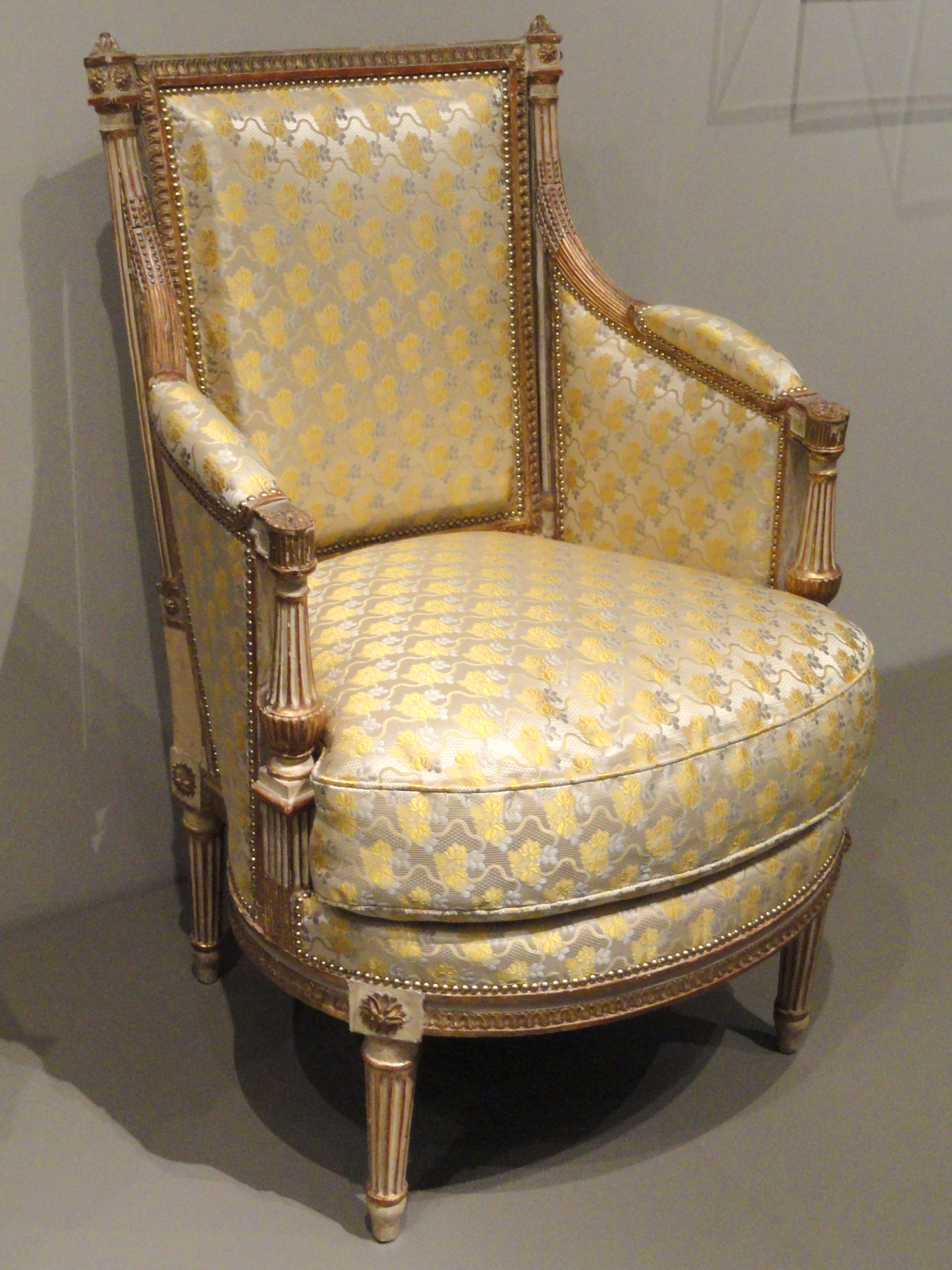
Armchair by Jean Avisse, 1780-1785.

Jean Avisse (1723 – 1796) produced chairs, sofas, chaises and similar furniture in 18th century France.

== Design ==
His chairs are elaborately decorated with natural images such as shells, flowers, and leaves. He stamped his work with the signature IAVISSE. Reproductions in his style are often called Avisse.

== Bankruptcy ==
He was not very successful during his life. Twice he was forced into bankruptcy, first in 1769 and again in 1776. He died in Paris.
