= Jenny Sacerdote =

French grand couturier (1868–1962)

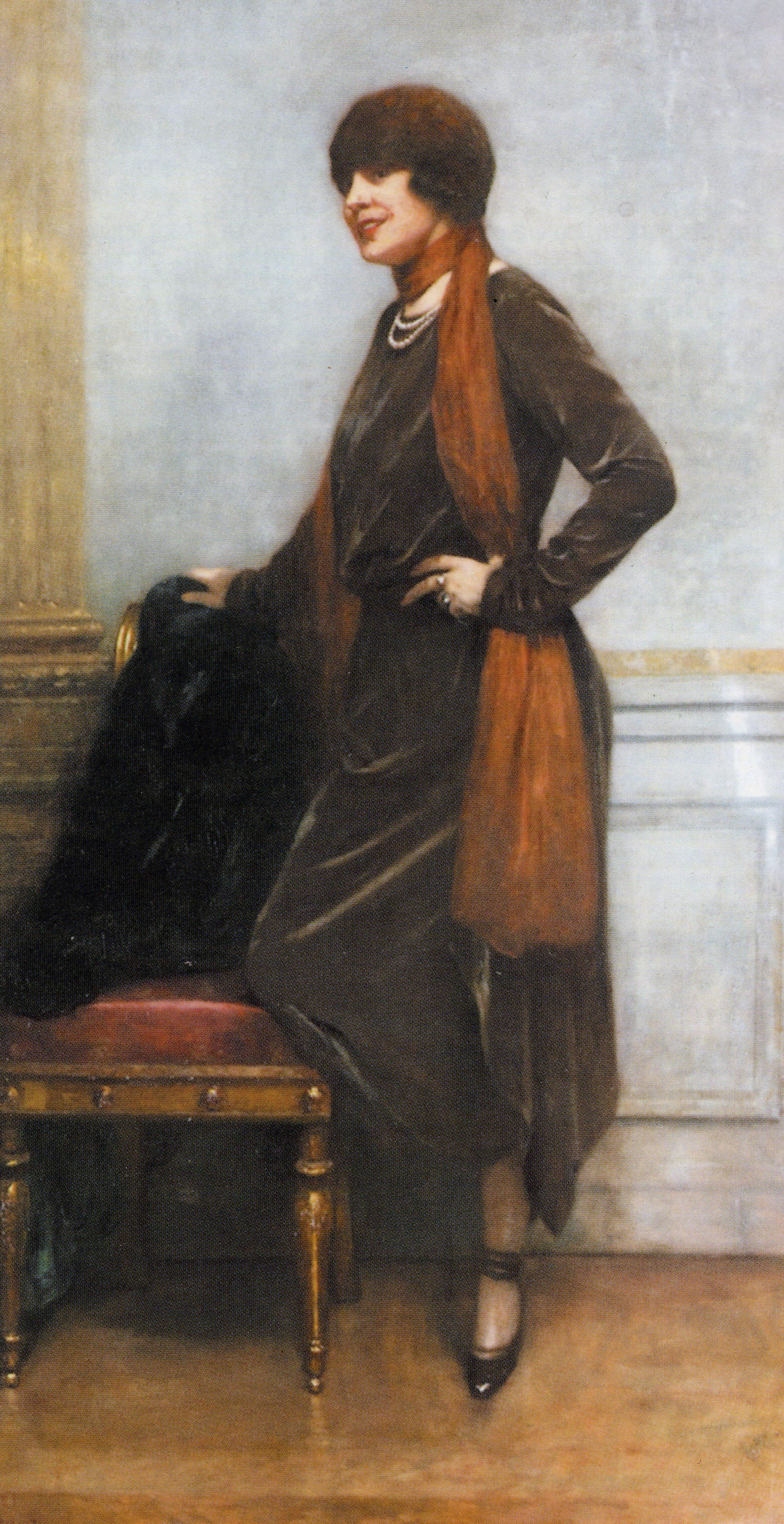
- Painting of Sacerdote, 1921, by Henri Gervex
- Born: Jeanne Adèle Bernard; 1868; Périgueux, Dordogne, France
- Died: 1962 (aged 93–94); Nice, France
- Other names: Madame Jenny
- Occupations: Fashion designer; dressmaker
- Known for: Little grey suit

Jeanne Adèle Bernard (1868–1962), known as Jenny Sacerdote and Madame Jenny, was a French couturier known for the "little grey suit". Her fashion brand was Jenny, and in 2018 a brand La Suite Jenny Sacerdote was established, paying tribute to her name.

== Personal life ==
Jeanne Adèle Bernard was born in Périgueux in the Dordogne in 1868. Her mother and grandmother worked in fashion, but she studied to become an academic before turning to fashion at the age of 39. She bought the chateau of Château-l'Évêque, the former summer palace of the Bishop of Périgueux, in 1923. She married Emil Sacerdote in 1909 and they divorced in 1940. She died in Nice in 1962.

== Career ==
Sacerdote opened her first shop at 1 rue de Castiglione in 1909. She developed the "Jenny neck", a boat neck, in 1911 and the "little grey suit" in 1915. By 1915 her premises at 70, Champs-Élysées, included 22 workshops, a restaurant, and showrooms decorated by Robert Mallet-Stevens. It was said that she invented the "little black dress" before Chanel. Her fashion house closed in 1940.

Sacerdote became a Chevalier of the Legion of Honour in 1926, for services to fashion. She was only the second woman to be granted this honour.

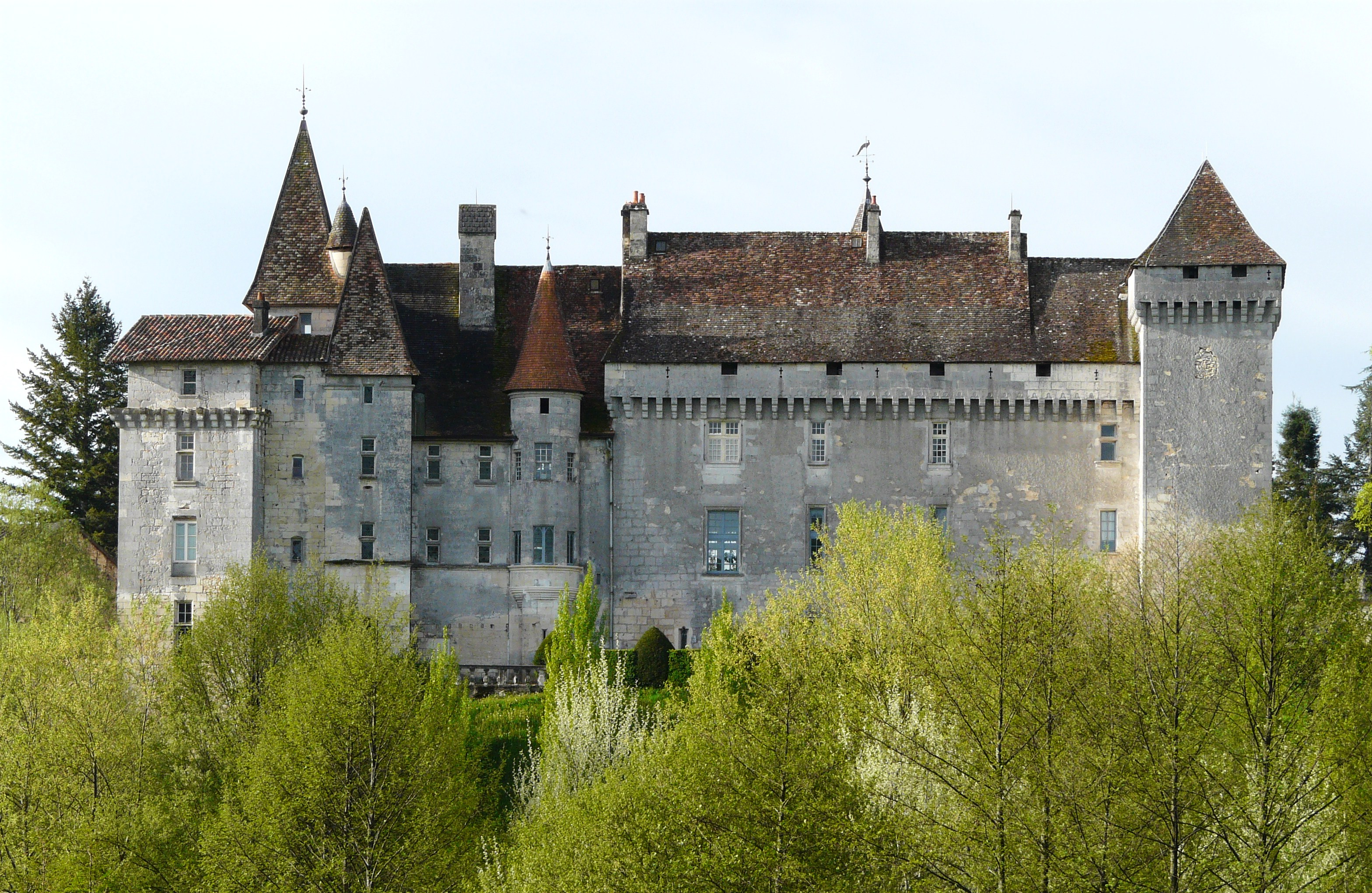
The Chateau of Château-l'Evêque, which Sacerdote bought in 1923
