= Camille Gandilhon Gens d'Armes =

French poet (1871–1948)

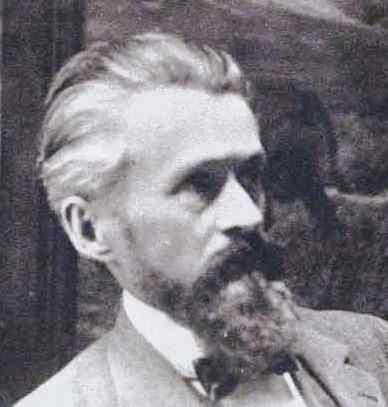
Poète Gandilhon -.jpg

Camille Gandilhon Gens d'Armes (1871–1948) was a French poet. He was born in Murat. He is known for his Poèmes arvernes, published in two volumes.
