= Jean-François Jarjavay =

French anatomist and surgeon (1815–1868)

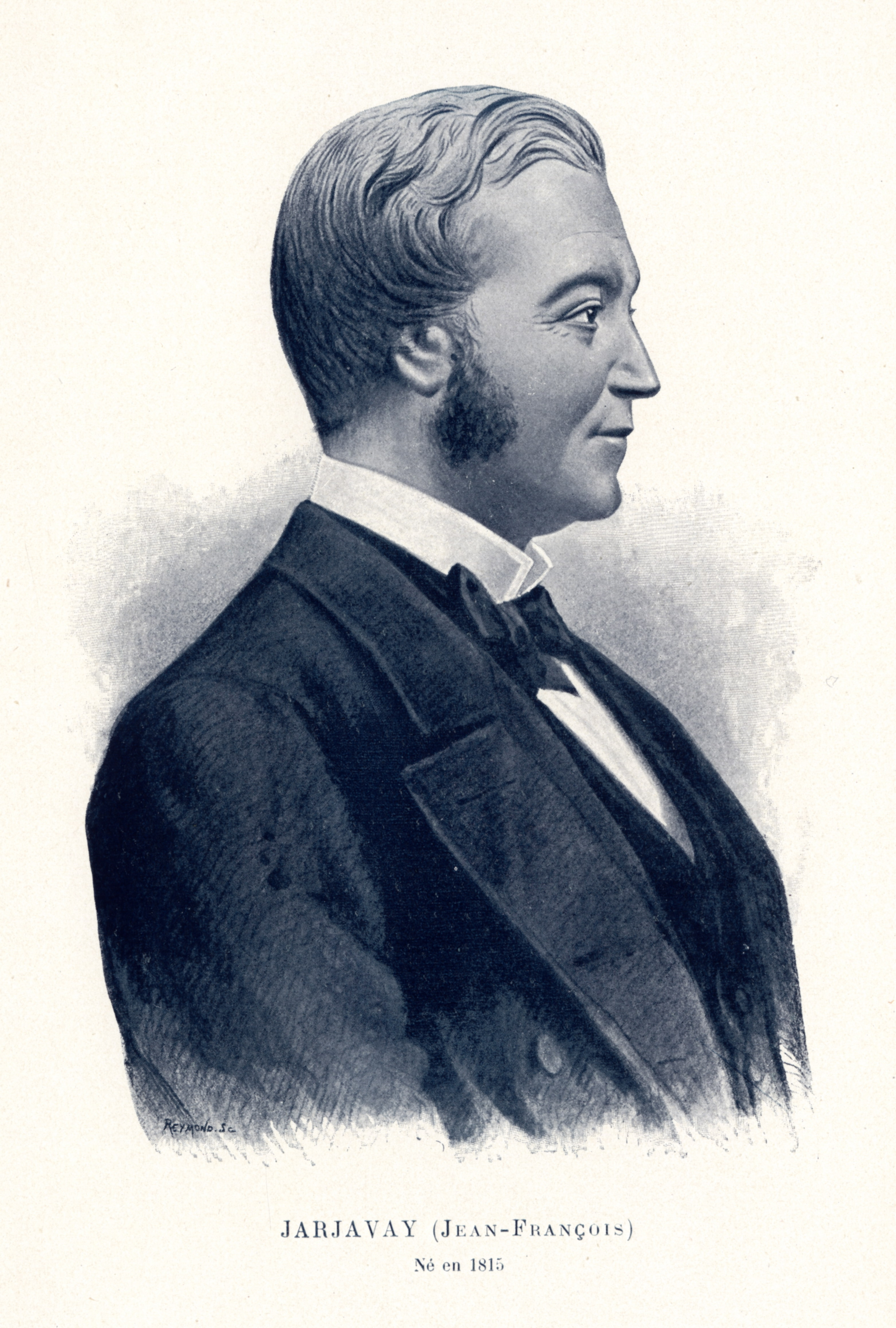
Jean-François Jarjavay

Jean-François Jarjavay (25 April 1815 – 22 April 1868) was a French anatomist and surgeon who was a native of Savignac-les-Églises in the department of Dordogne. He practised medicine at the Hôpital Lourcine and Hôpital Beaujon in Paris, and in 1859 became a professor of anatomy.

In 1867 Jarjavay provided the first description of the morbid processes associated with subacromial bursitis, a disorder also known as subacromial impingement syndrome. His name is lent to "Jarjavay's ligament", which is a fold of peritoneum that is also known as a sacrouterine fold, and "Jarjavay's muscle", which is a structure arising from the ramus of the ischium and inserted into the constrictor muscle of the vagina.

== Written works ==
Among his written works is an 1856 book on the urethra titled Recherches anatomiques sur l’urèthre de l’homme. Other noted works are as follows:

- Propositions d'anatomie, de physiologie et de chirurgie (1846)
- De l'influence des efforts sur la production des maladies chirurgicales (1847)
- Mémoire sur les fongus du testicule (1849)
- Des fractures des articulations (1851)
- Traité d'anatomie chirurgicale (1852–54).

== Bibliography ==
- Dorlands Medical Dictionary (definition of eponyms)
