= Étienne Arnal =

French comic actor (1794–1872)

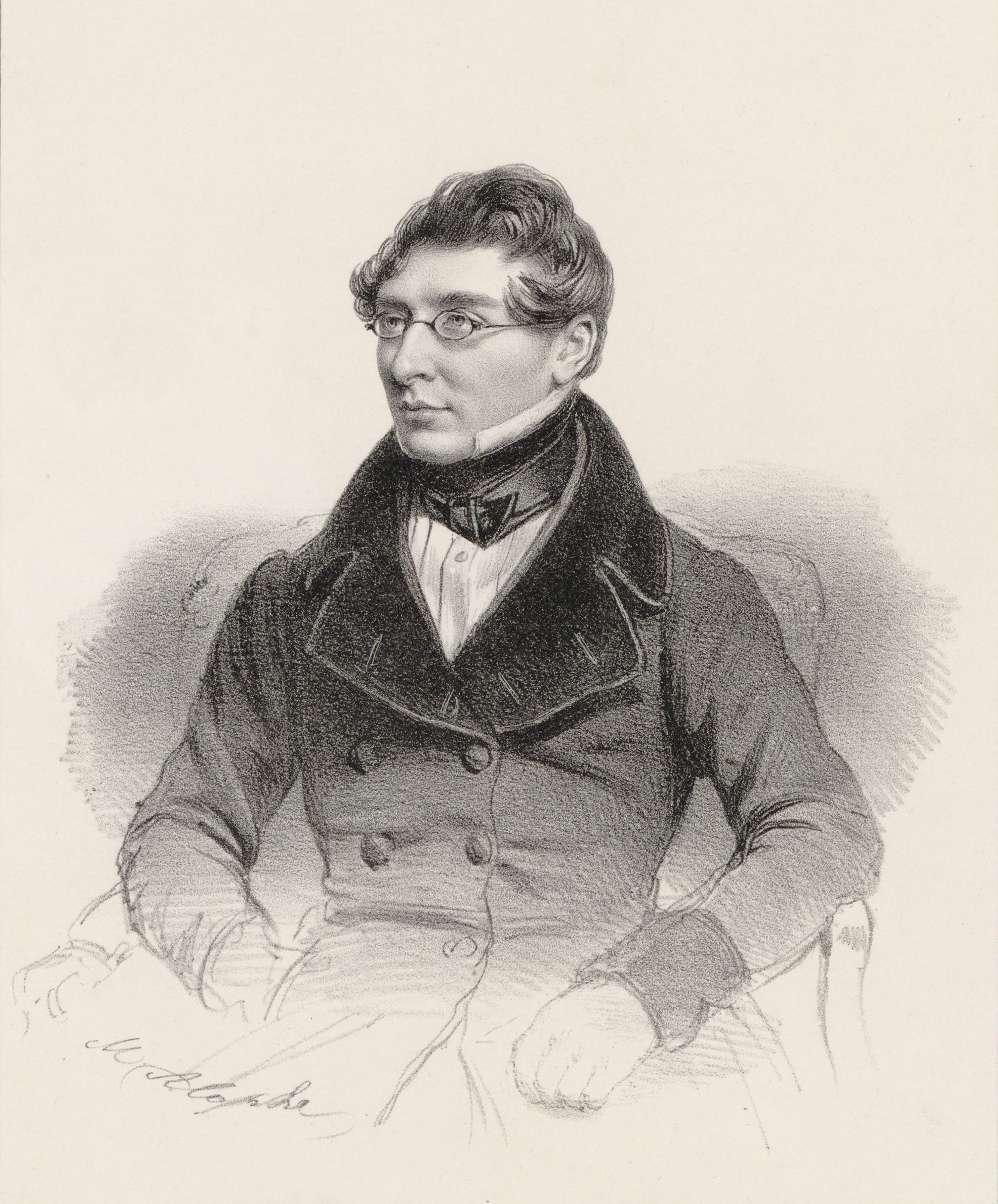
Arnal

Étienne Arnal (2 February 1794 – 10 December 1872) was a French comic actor.

== Life ==
Arnal was born at Meulan, Yvelines. After serving in the army, and working in a button factory, he took to the stage. His first appearance (1815) was in tragedy, and for some time he was unsuccessful; it was not until 1827 that he showed his real ability in comedy parts, especially in plays by Felix August Duvert (1795–1876) and Augustin Theodore Lauzanne (1805–1877), whose Cabinets particuliers (1832), Le Mari de la dame de châteurs (1837), Passe minuit, L'Homme blast (1843), La Clef dans le dos (1848), etc., contained parts written for him. He was twenty years at the Vaudeville, and completed at the various Parisian theatres a stage career of nearly half a century.

The composer Frédéric Chopin describes, in a letter, visiting the theatre in 1847 to see Arnal: "[He] tells the audience how he was desperate to pee in a train, but couldn't get to a toilet before they stopped at Orléans. There wasn't a single vulgar word in what he said, but everyone understood and split their sides laughing."

Arnal was the author of Épître à bouffe (1840), which is reprinted in his volume of poetry, Boutades en vers (1861). He died in Geneva, aged 78.

== Sources ==
- Attwood, William G. (1999). The Parisian Worlds of Frédéric Chopin. New Haven: Yale University Press. ISBN 0-300-07773-4.
- Gautier, Théophile (1988). Correspondance générale ed. Claudine Lacoste-Veysseyre, Volume 3.
