= Louis Dominique Girard =

French hydraulic engineer

Louis Dominique Girard (1815- Paris, 1871) was a French hydraulic engineer.

A friend and colleague of Léon Foucault, Girard was most notable for his work with impulse turbines. His 1856 design greatly improved on the Jonval turbines that were then common, although it was in turn supplanted by the Pelton wheel in the latter portion of the 19th century.
