= 1797 in France =

- Decades: 1770s; 1780s; 1790s; 1800s; 1810s
- See also: History of France; Timeline of French history; List of years in France

Events from the year 1797 in France.

== Incumbents ==
- The French Directory

== Events ==
- 14 January-15 January - Battle of Rivoli, decisive French victory over Austria.
- 19 February - Treaty of Tolentino signed between France and the Papal States.
- 22 February - The Last invasion of Britain begins. French forces under the command of American Colonel William Tate land near Fishguard in Wales.
- 25 February - Tate surrenders at Fishguard.
- 16 March - Battle of Tagliamento, French victory over Habsburg Austria.
- 21-23 March - Battle of Tarvis, French victory over Austria.
- 17 April - Treaty of Leoben, preliminary accord between France and Austria.
- 18 April - Battle of Neuwied, French victory over Austria.
- 20 April - Battle of Diersheim, French victory over Austrian forces.
- 12 May - France conquers Venice, ending the 1100 years of independence of the city.
- 17 October - Treaty of Campo Formio signed between France and Austria.
- 17 December - Napoleon leads a successful French charge against Fort l'Aiguilette to secure Toulon.

== Births ==
- 27 March - Alfred de Vigny, poet, playwright, and novelist (died 1863)
- 16 April - Adolphe Thiers, politician, historian and Prime Minister of France (died 1877)
- 27 April - Jean Victoire Audouin, naturalist, entomologist and ornithologist (died 1841)
- 10 September - Benjamin Nicolas Marie Appert, philanthropist (died 1847)
- 6 November - Gabriel Andral, pathologist (died 1876)

== Deaths ==
- 11 February - Antoine Dauvergne, composer and violinist (born 1713)
- 17 May - Michel-Jean Sedaine, dramatist (born 1719)
- 27 May
  - François-Noël Babeuf, political agitator and journalist, executed (born 1760)
  - Augustin Alexandre Darthé, Revolutionary, executed (born 1769)
- 18 November - Jacques-Alexandre Laffon de Ladebat, shipbuilder and merchant (born 1719)
