= 1791 in France =

- Decades: 1770s; 1780s; 1790s; 1800s; 1810s
- See also: History of France; Timeline of French history; List of years in France

Events from the year 1791 in France.

== Incumbents ==
- Monarch: Louis XVI
- The Legislative Assembly (after 1 October)

== Events ==
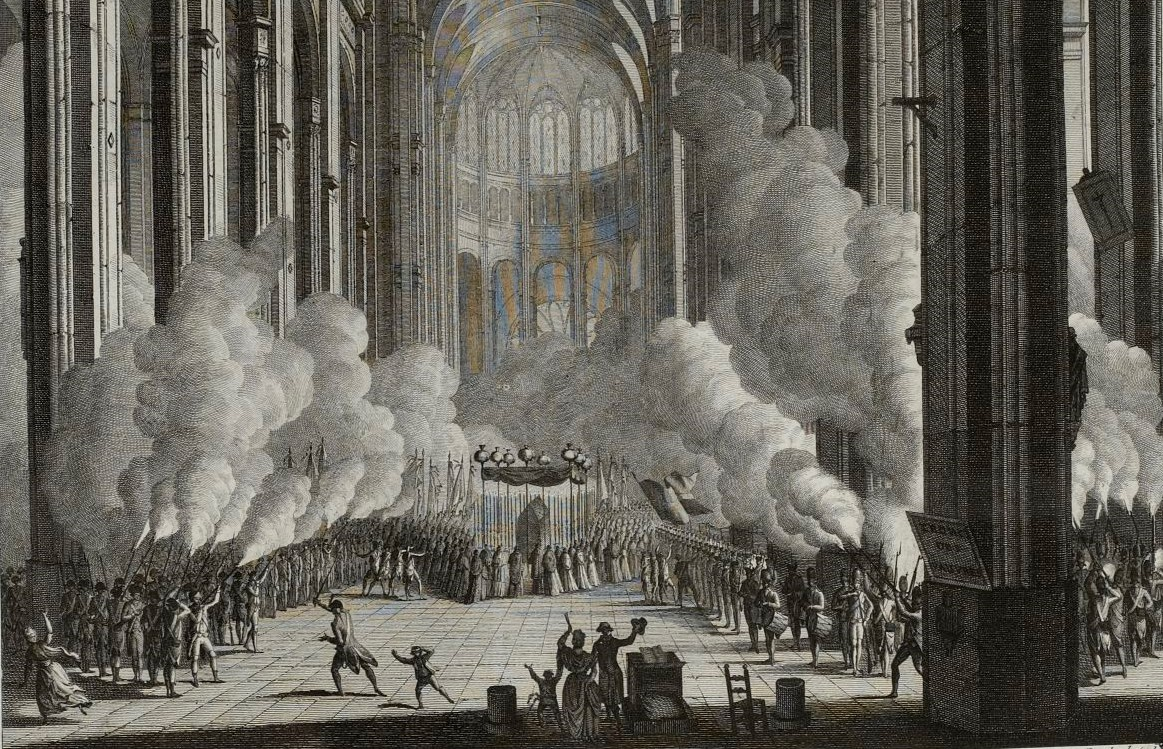
Funeral of Comte de Mirabeau in the Church of St Eustache, April 4, 1791, (Musée de la Révolution française).

=== January ===
- 28 January – Robespierre discusses the organisation of the National Guard in the Assembly; for three years a hot topic in French newspapers.

=== February ===
- 28 February – Day of Daggers; a confrontation between the guards and nobles.

=== March ===
- 2 March – Claude Chappe and his brothers first demonstrate the optical telegraph.
- Early March – Provincial militias are abolished and the Département de Paris is placed above the Paris Commune (1789-1795) in all matters of general order and security.
- March – The National Constituent Assembly accepts the recommendation of its Commission of Weights and Measures that the nation should adopt the metric system.

=== May ===
- 9 May – The Assembly discusses the right to petition.
- 15 May – The Constituent Assembly declares full and equal citizenship for all free people of color.
- 16–18 May – Elections begin; Robespierre proposes and carries the motion that no deputy who sat in the Constituent assembly can sit in the succeeding Legislative assembly.
- 28 May – Robespierre proposes all Frenchmen should be declared active citizens and eligible to vote.
- 30 May – Robespierre delivers a speech on the abolition of the death penalty but without success.

=== June ===
- 14 June – The abolition of the guild system is sealed; the Le Chapelier Law 1791 passes, which prohibits any kind of workers' coalition or assembly.
- 20–21 June – During the Flight to Varennes, Louis XVI and his family attempt to escape Paris, but are instead arrested at Varennes.

=== July ===
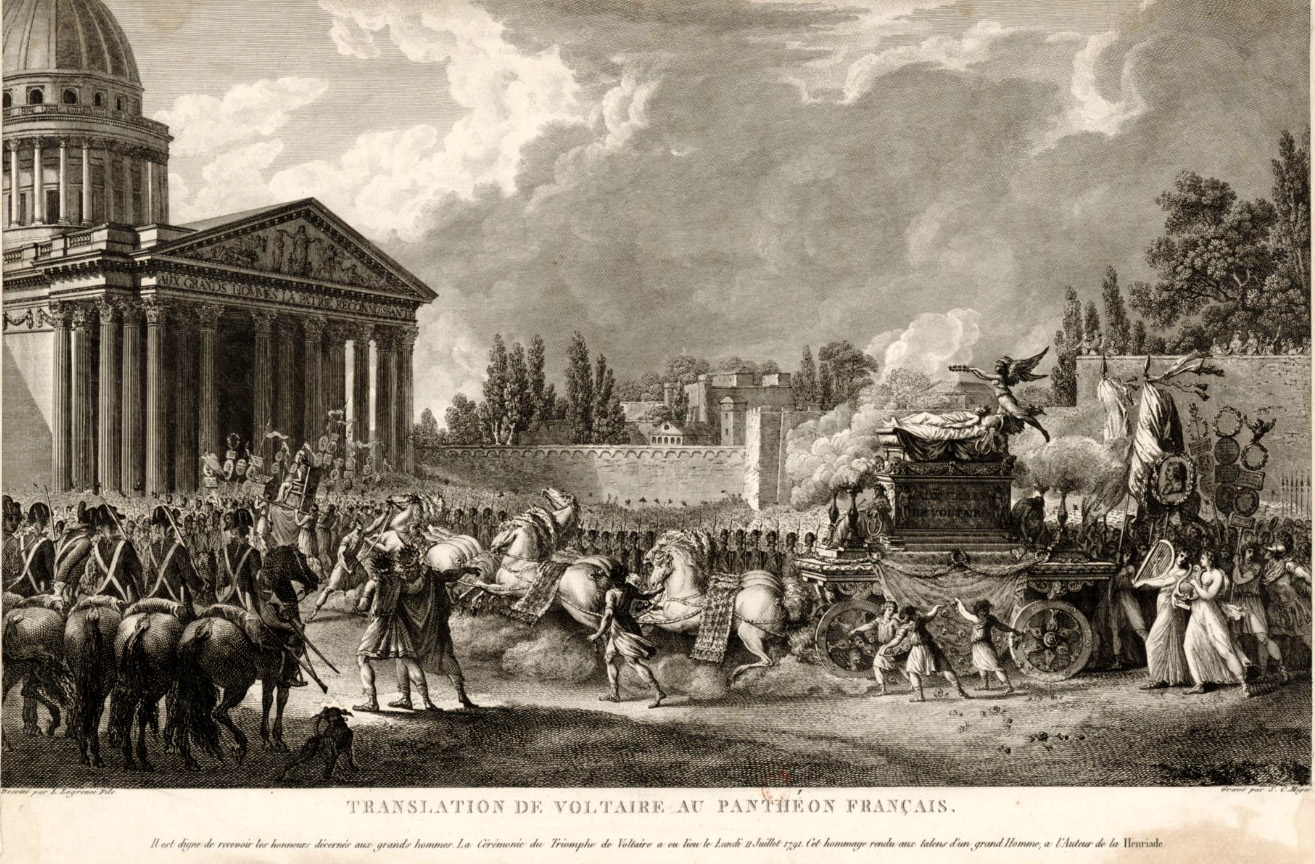
Translation of Voltaire

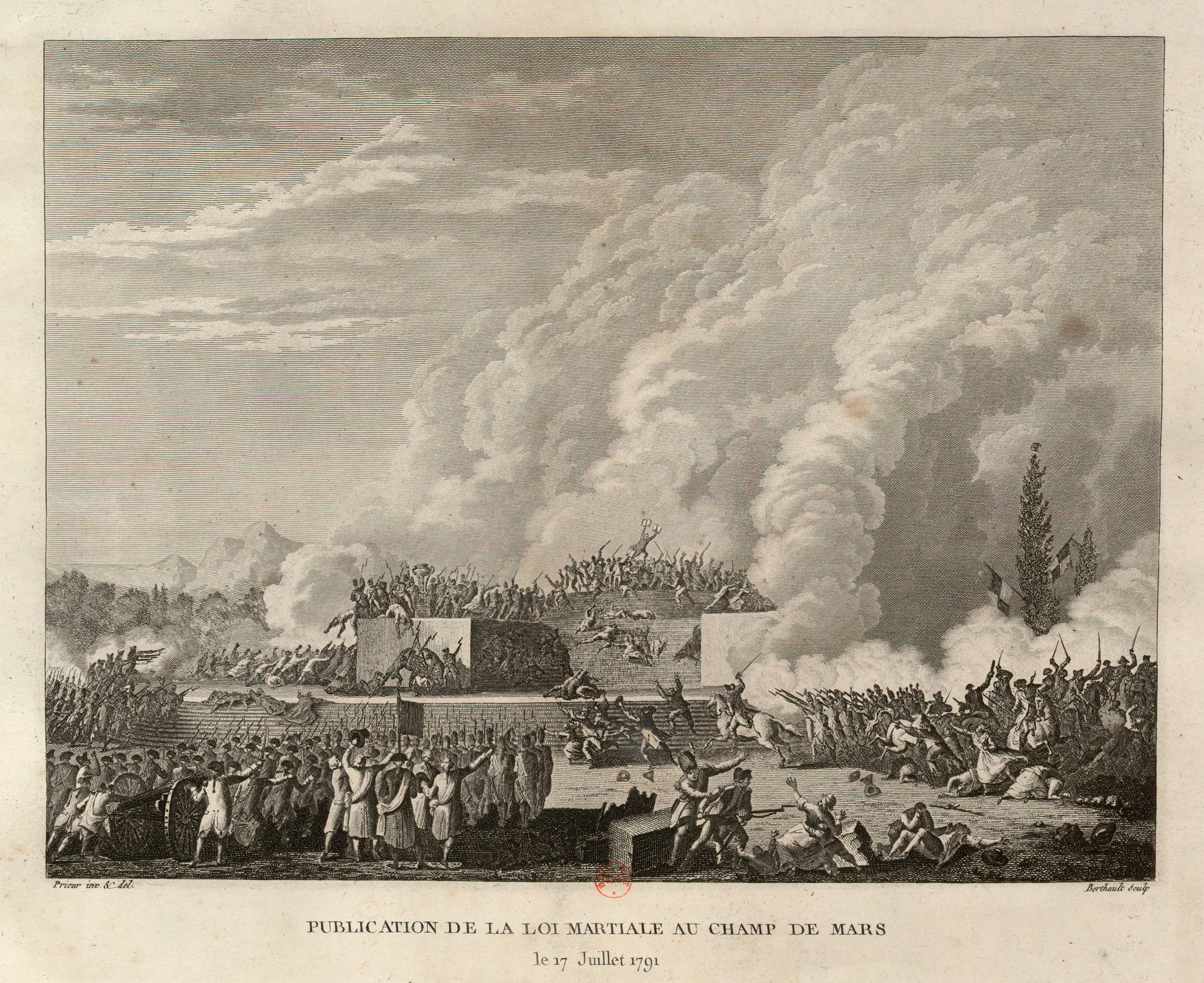
Champ de Mars massacre

- 11 July – The ashes of Voltaire are transferred to the Panthéon. An estimated million people attend the procession.
- 13–15 July – The Assembly debates the restoration of the king and his constitutional rights.
- 17 July – The Champ de Mars massacre occurs in Paris. Jean Sylvain Bailly and Marquis de LaFayette declare a ban on gathering followed by martial law.
- 19 July – The King is restored to his functions.

=== August ===
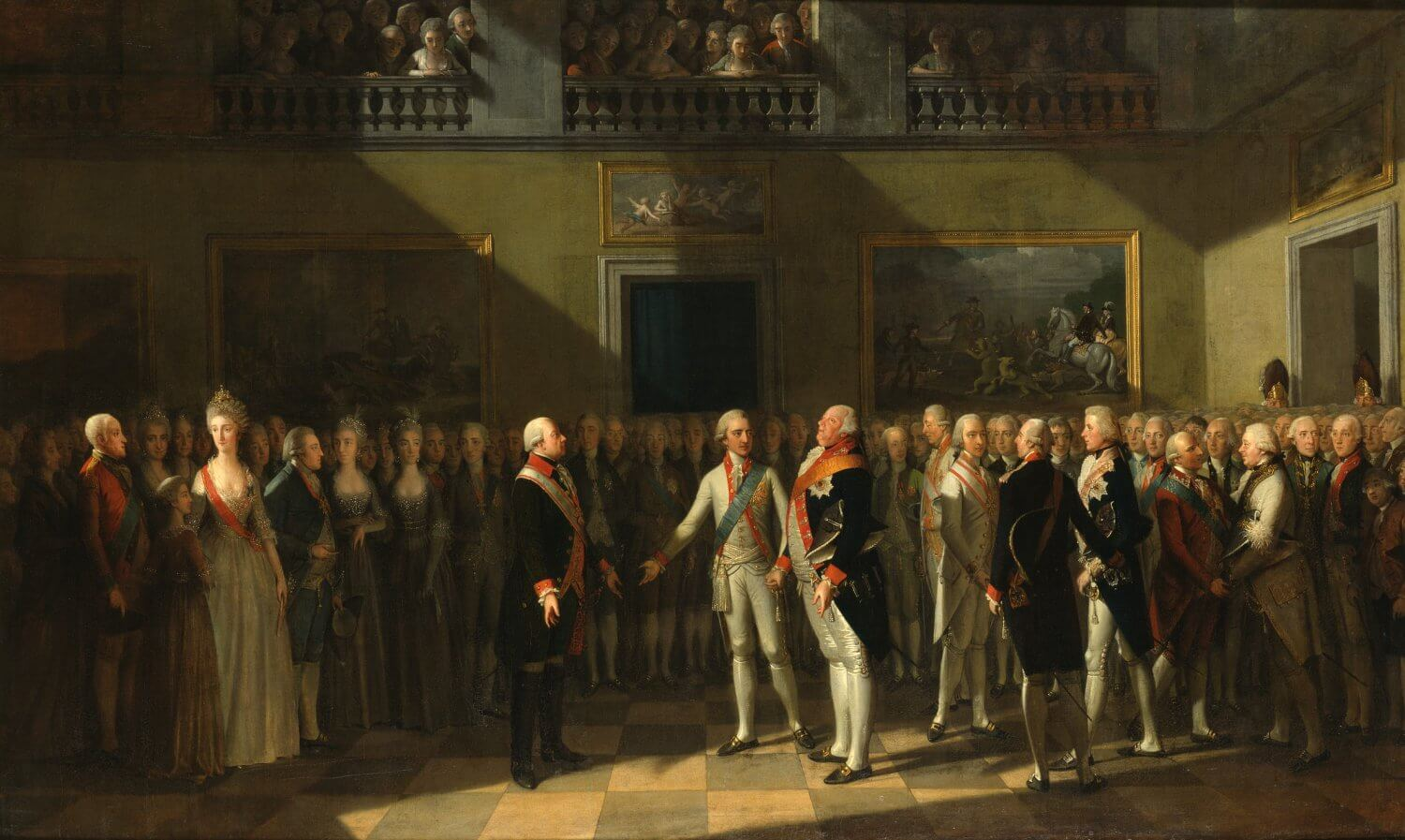
Declaration of Pillnitz

- 21 August – Haitian Revolution: A slave rebellion breaks out in the French colony of Saint-Domingue.
- 27 August
  - Declaration of Pillnitz: A proclamation by Frederick William II of Prussia and the Habsburg Leopold II, Holy Roman Emperor, affirms their wish to "put the King of France in a state to strengthen the bases of monarchic government."
  - Third Anglo-Mysore War: Battle of Tellicherry: Off the south-west coast of India: a British Royal Navy patrol forces a French convoy bound for Mysore to surrender.
- 29 August–5 September – 1791 French legislative election.

=== September ===
- 3 September – The French Constitution of 1791 is accepted.
- 4 September – Louis XVI receives the title of King of the French.
- 13 September – Louis XVI accepts the final version of the completed constitution.
- 14 September – The Papal States lose Avignon to France.
- 28 September – Law on Jewish emancipation is promulgated, the first such legislation in modern Europe.
- 29 September – On the day before the dissolution of the Assembly, Robespierre opposes Jean Le Chapelier, who wants to proclaim an end to the revolution and restrict the freedom of the clubs.

=== October ===
- 1 October – The Legislative Assembly convenes.
- 6 October – The French Penal Code of 1791 is adopted.
- 14 October – A law is passed to reorganize the Garde Nationale in cantons and districts; officers and sub-officers are to be elected for one year only.
- 16–17 October – Massacres of La Glacière.
- 28 October – The Declaration of the Rights of Woman and of the Female Citizen is published.

=== November ===
- 16 November – Pétion de Villeneuve is elected mayor of Paris in a contest against Lafayette.

=== Undated ===
- Camembert cheese reputedly first made by Marie Harel, a farmer from Normandy.

== Births ==
- 28 January – Ferdinand Hérold, composer
- 26 May – Jean Vatout, poet and historian
- 30 June – Félix Savart, physicist
- 19 July – Odilon Barrot, politician
- 26 September – Théodore Géricault, painter
- 17 November – Louis-Étienne de Thouvenin, general
- 24 December – Eugène Scribe, dramatist and librettist

== Deaths ==
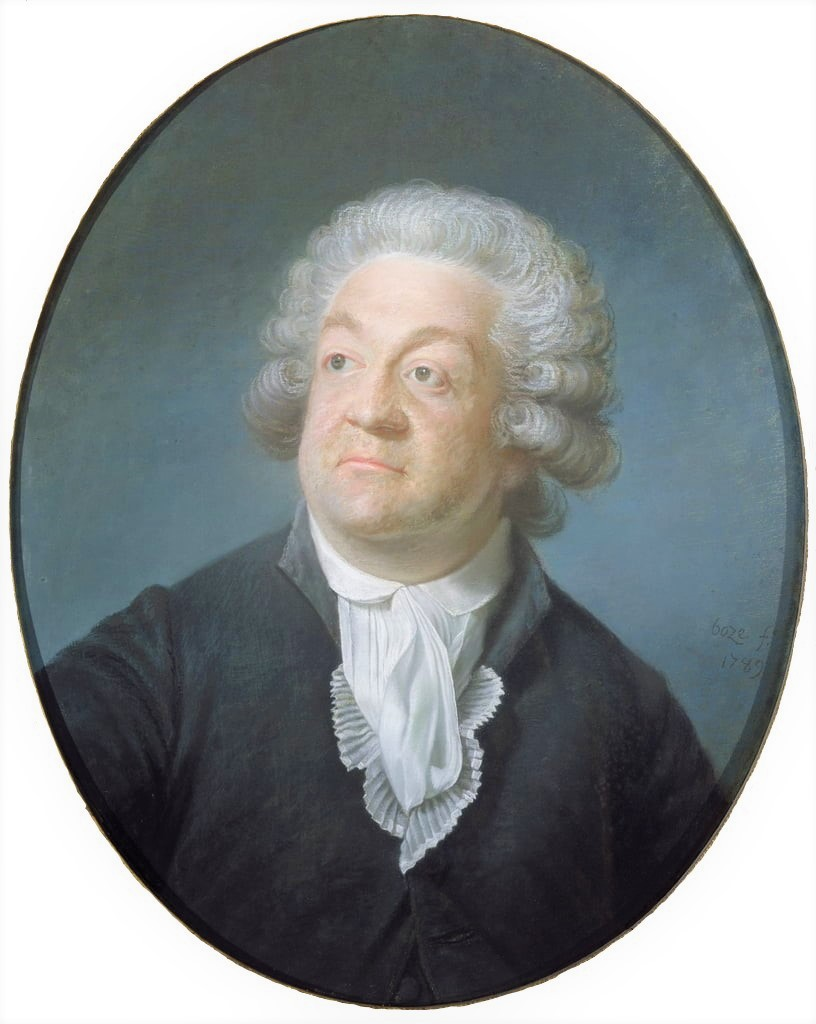
Honoré Gabriel Riqueti, comte de Mirabeau

- 2 April – Honoré Gabriel Riqueti, comte de Mirabeau, revolutionary leader
- 10 June – Toussaint-Guillaume Picquet de la Motte, admiral
- 9 July – Jacques-Nicolas Tardieu, engraver
- 26 November – Nicolas Bricaire de la Dixmerie, man of letters
- 12 December – Etteilla, occult cartomancer
- 13 December – Mathieu Tillet, botanist
