= Louis-Henri Foreau =

French painter

- Born: 1866; France
- Died: 1938 (aged 71–72); France
- Education: Jules Lefebvre; Luc-Olivier Merson; Henri Harpignies
- Known for: Landscape painting
- Movement: Impressionism, Symbolism, Barbizon school

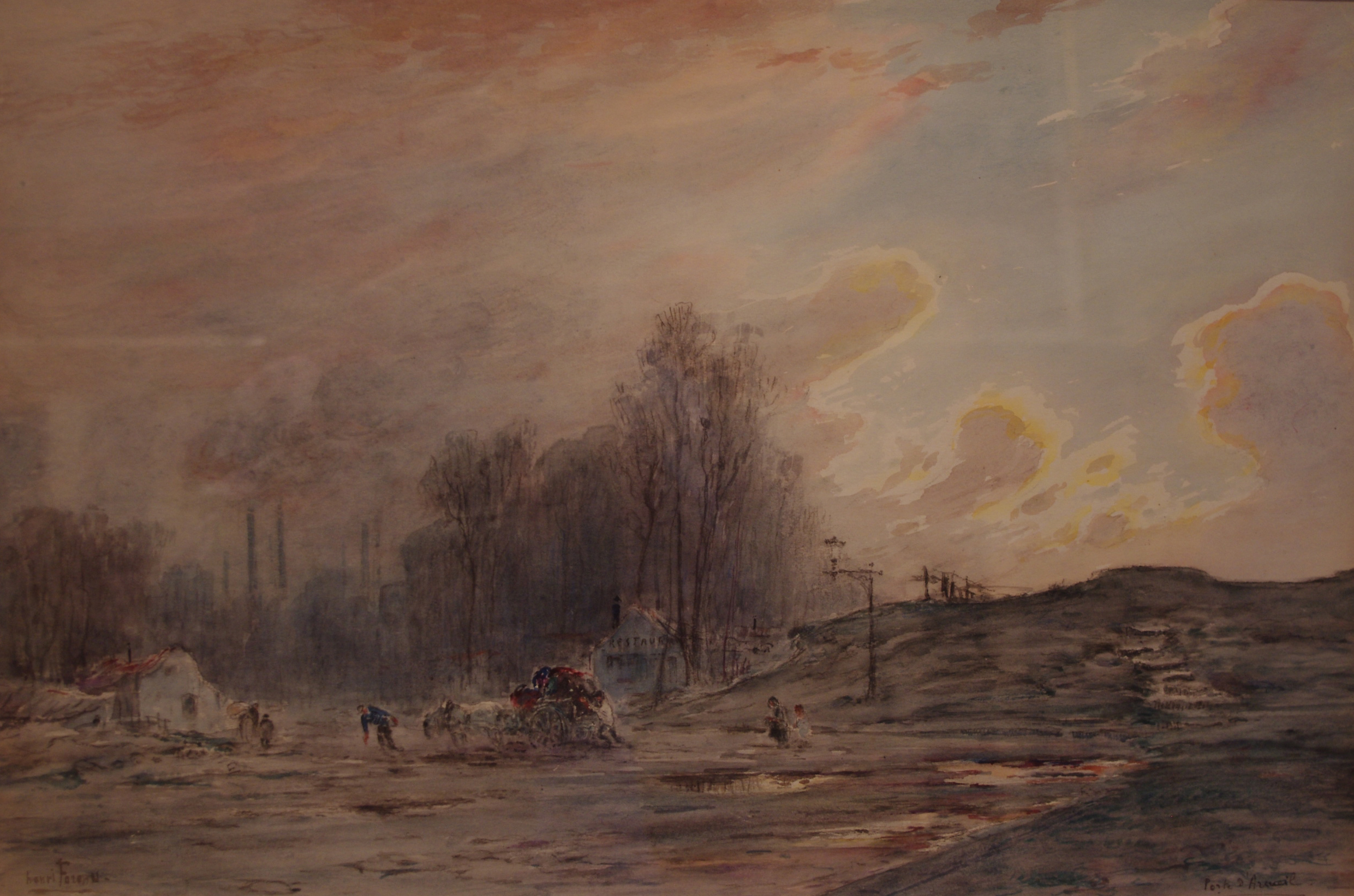
Porte d'Arcueil by Louis-Henri Foreau

Louis-Henri Foreau (1866–1938) was a French artist.

Foreau was a student of Jules Lefebvre, Henry Lévy, Luc-Olivier Merson and mainly of Henri Harpignies, with whom he became good friends.

From 1888 onwards he often participated in the different Salon exhibitions in France and abroad. He became a jury member of the Société des Artistes Français, and chairman of the Association des Paysagistes Français.

In his work influences from the Impressionists, the Symbolists and Barbizon movement are visible. Nevertheless, Foreau created his own style, which is characterized by a strict technique, an intense form of observation and a refined, somewhat melancholic atmosphere, which is also apparent in the work of Corot.

In his oeuvre he drew on three themes: rural life, gardens and parks and Paris and its surroundings.
