= 1802 in France =

- Decades: 1780s; 1790s; 1800s; 1810s; 1820s
- See also: History of France; Timeline of French history; List of years in France

Events from the year 1802 in France.

== Incumbents ==
- The French Consulate

== Events ==
- 23 February - Haitian Revolution: Battle of Ravine-à-Couleuvres, French victory.
- 4 March-24 March - Haitian Revolution: Battle of Crête-à-Pierrot, French victory, taking a besieged fort from Haitian forces.
- 25 March - Treaty of Amiens, temporarily ended hostilities between France and the United Kingdom during the French Revolutionary Wars.
- 8 April - Organic Articles presented by Napoleon.
- 26 April - General amnesty signed by Napoleon Bonaparte allowed all but about one thousand of the most notorious émigrés of the French Revolution to return to France.
- 10 May - Constitutional Referendum ratified the new constitution of the Consulate, which made Napoleon Bonaparte First Consul for life.
- 19 May - Napoleon establishes the légion d'honneur (Legion of Honour).
- 20 May - Napoleon Bonaparte reinstates slavery in the French colonies, which had been abolished during the French Revolution.
- 8 June - Haitian Revolution: Revolutionary Toussaint Louverture is seized by French troops and sent to Fort de Joux prison.
- 11 September - The Italian region of Piedmont becomes a part of the French First Republic.
- October - French army enters Switzerland.

== Births ==
=== January to June ===
- 3 January - Félix Dupanloup, Bishop of Orléans (died 1878)
- 6 February - Gustave de Beaumont, magistrate, prison reformer and travel companion to Alexis de Tocqueville (died 1865)
- 26 February - Victor Hugo, poet, playwright, novelist and statesman (died 1885)
- 5 May - Jean-Joseph Gaume, Roman Catholic theologian and author (died 1879)
- 6 May - Charles Nicholas Aubé, physician and entomologist (died 1869)
- 22 June - Émile de Girardin, journalist, publicist and politician (died 1881)

=== July to December ===
- 24 July - Alexandre Dumas, père, writer (died 1870)
- 2 August - Louis Désiré Blanquart-Evrard, photographer (died 1872)
- 24 September - Adolphe d'Archiac, geologist and paleontologist (died 1868)
- 30 September - Antoine Jérôme Balard, chemist and discoverer of bromine (died 1876)
- 10 October - Napoleon Charles Bonaparte, eldest son of Louis Bonaparte (died 1807)
- 15 October - Louis-Eugène Cavaignac, General (died 1857)
- 31 October - Benoît Fourneyron, engineer, designed the first practical water turbine (died 1867)
- 13 November - Jean Gailhac, priest (died 1890)
- 18 November - Jules Baroche, statesman and Minister (died 1870)
- 1 December - Armand-François-Marie de Charbonnel, Bishop of Toronto (died 1891)

=== Full date unknown ===
- Eugène Flachat, civil engineer (died 1873)

== Deaths ==
=== January to June ===
- 18 January - Antoine Darquier de Pellepoix, astronomer (born 1718)
- 7 February - Philippe-Louis-François Badelard, soldier and surgeon (born 1728)
- 21 February - René Maugé de Cely, zoologist
- 7 March - Clothilde of France, Princess and Queen Consort of Sardinia (born 1759)
- 1 April - Joseph Duplessis, painter (born 1725)
- 3 April - Philippe-François de Rastel de Rocheblave, soldier, businessman and politician in Lower Canada (born 1727)

=== July to December ===
- 11 July - Alexandre Dumas, lawyer, notary, businessman and political figure in Lower Canada (b. c.1726)
- 15 July - Louis-Marie Stanislas Fréron, politician and journalist (born 1754; yellow fever)
- 22 July - Xavier Bichat, anatomist and pathologist (born 1771)
- 24 July - Joseph Ducreux, painter and engraver (born 1735)
- 12 August - Louis Lebègue Duportail, soldier and Minister (born 1743)
- 3 September - Antoine Richepanse, Revolutionary general and colonial administrator (born 1770)
- 11 October - André Michaux, botanist and explorer (born 1746)
- 30 October - Charles Alexandre de Calonne, statesman (born 1734)
- 2 November - Charles Leclerc, General and brother-in-law of Napoleon I of France (born 1772)
