= 1804 in France =

- Decades: 1780s; 1790s; 1800s; 1810s; 1820s
- See also: History of France; Timeline of French history; List of years in France

Events from the year 1804 in France

== Incumbents ==
- French Consulate (until 18 May) then Napoleon I

== Events ==
- 21 March – The Napoleonic Code entered into force, forbidding privileges based on birth, allowing freedom of religion, and specifying that government jobs should go to the most qualified
- 14 May – Napoleon Bonaparte was given the title of Emperor by the French Senate.
- 18 May – First French Empire established.
- 2–3 October – Raid on Boulogne
- November – Constitutional referendum concerning the establishment of the French Empire
- 2 December – Coronation of Napoleon I

== Births ==
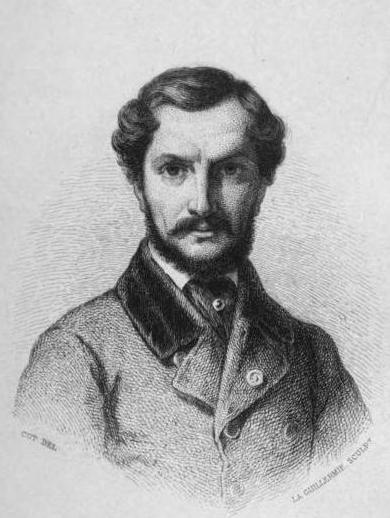
Francisque Joseph Duret.

- 3 October – Allan Kardec, writer (died 1869)
- 19 October – Francisque Joseph Duret, sculptor (died 1865)
- 24 December – Édouard Chassaignac, surgeon (died 1879)

== Deaths ==
- 28 February – Marie Louise Marcadet, opera singer and actress (born 1758 in Sweden)
- 20 September – Pierre Méchain, astronomer (born 1744)
- 2 October – Nicolas-Joseph Cugnot, inventor (born 1725)
- 15 October – Antoine Baumé, chemist (born 1728)
- 2 November – Armand-Gaston Camus, revolutionist (born 1740)
- 1 December – Philippe le Bon, engineer (born 1767)
