= Jean-Claude-Léonard Baveux =

French Sulpician priest

- Born: November 6, 1796; Montier-en-Der, France
- Died: November 21, 1865 (aged 69); Montreal, Lower Canada
- Church: Roman Catholic

Jean-Claude-Léonard Baveux (November 6, 1796 – November 21, 1865) was a Sulpician priest, teacher, and a member of the Missionary Oblates of Mary Immaculate ministry.

Baveux was born in France, served in Napoleon’s army, and then studied for the priesthood. Wishing to serve in Canada, he joined the Sulpicians in 1827. He was ordained the next year and left for Montreal, Lower Canada. In 1842 he entered the noviciate of the Oblates at Longueuil, Quebec, Canada, and was immediately active in that organization.

In October 1846 Joseph-Bruno Guigues encouraged Baveux to recruit new Oblates for the Canadian mission and he was very successful in France and Belgium.
