= Auguste Simon Paris =

French notary and entomologist

Auguste Simon Paris (September 1794, in Charleville-Mézières in the Ardennes – 7 September 1869, in Paris) was a French notary and entomologist.

A former notary who retired to live in Épernay, he was interested in butterflies and Coleoptera and assembled a rich personal collection, sold on his death. He was a Member of the Société entomologique de France from 1834, and its president in 1866.

== Sources ==
- Robert Constantin (1992). Mémorial des coléoptères français. Supplément n° 14 au Bulletin de l’Association des coléoptères de la région parisienne (Acorep) : 92 p. et 5 planches.
- Translation from French Wikipedia.
