= Jacques-François Ochard =

French painter

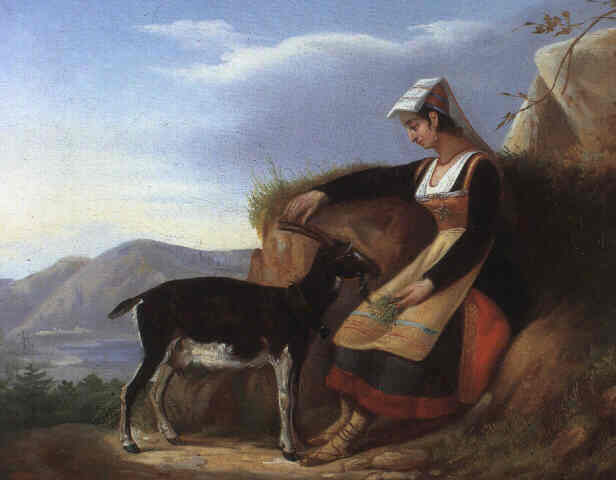
La Jeune Italienne by Jacques-François Ochard

Jacques-François Ochard (1800–1870) was a French artist, remembered as the first art teacher of Claude Monet at his high school.

Ochard had been a student of Jacques-Louis David (1748–1825), and lived in Normandy, to where Monet's family had moved in 1845. Ochard's method of instruction was the traditional one of drawing from plaster casts of the human figure.
