= Auguste Belloc =

French photographer

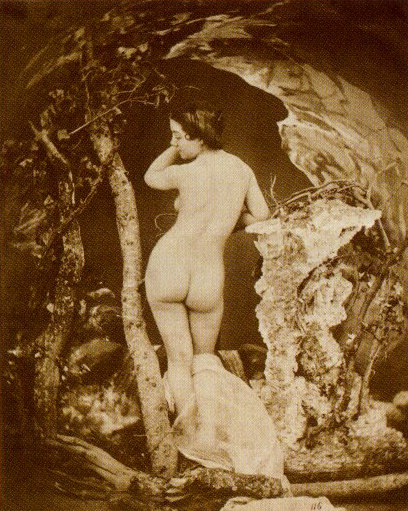
Baigneuse, circa 1855

Auguste Belloc (French: [bɛlɔk]; 1805, Montrabé – 1867, Paris) was a French photographer, known for his erotic works. He was born in Montrabé, and died in Paris. Belloc began his career as a painter of miniatures and watercolors. Belloc's first photographic studio was mentioned in 1851. Belloc practiced daguerreotype, he became involved in wet collodion development and improved the wax coating process, helping the photos to keep their wet-like luster.

Belloc led important research about color stereoscopy (3-dimensional photography).

== In literature ==
Belloc is one the main characters of the novel "La sed del ojo" (2004) written by the colombian Pablo Montoya. In this book, Belloc is portrayed as one of the masterminds behind the erotic photos that flooded Paris in the mid-19th century, and is chased by the detective Madeleine, another voyeurist.

In this book are displayed several erotic photos of Belloc's work and another artists.
