= Auguste-Marseille Barthélemy =

French poet (1796–1867)

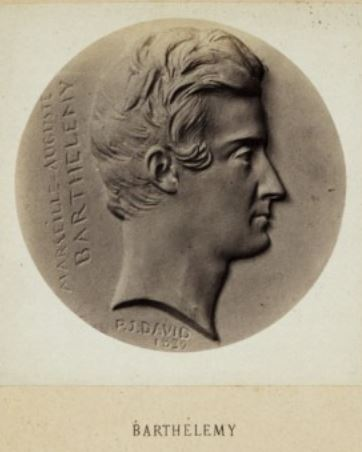

Auguste-Marseille Barthélemy (1796 – 23 August 1867) was a French satirical poet. His name can hardly be separated from that of his friend and compatriot, Joseph Méry (1798–1866), with whom he carried on so intimate a collaboration that it is not possible to distinguish their personalities in their joint works.

== Life ==
Auguste-Marseille Barthélemy was born in 1796 in Marseille. After having established some local reputation as a poet, Barthélemy went to Paris, where by one of his first efforts, Le Sacre de Charles X (1825) he gained the favor of the court. His energies, however, were soon enlisted in the service of the opposition party. In 1825 appeared a clever political satire, Les Sidiennes, followed by La Villéliade ou la prise du château de Rivoli (1827), La Corbiéréide (1827), La Peyronnéide, the joint productions of Barthélemy and Méry. The success was immediate and pronounced; fifteen editions of the Villéliade were called for during the year. A rapid succession of political squibs and satires was now poured forth by the authors, among the most remarkable being Biographie des quarante de l’Académie française (1826) and Napoléon en Égypte (1828), which passed through nearly a dozen editions in a year.

In 1829 Barthélemy was imprisoned and fined 1000 francs for the publication of their Fils de l'homme, a poem on the Duke of Reichstadt, Napoleon's son. The July Revolution of 1830 liberated him; and in company with Méry, he celebrated the triumph of the people in one of their most brilliant efforts, L'Insurrection. From March 1831 to April 1832 they produced a series of verse satires issued weekly, the Némésis, attacking the government and ministers of Louis Philippe. The small pension of which Barthélemy was the recipient was stopped. When the publication ceased there was a strong suspicion that Barthélemy had been paid for his silence, although a collection of the satires went through several editions in the 1830s. In 1832 he published an anonymous poem, supporting some acts of the government which were peculiarly obnoxious to the liberal faction of the Orléanist party. This change of front destroyed his influence and his later writings passed unnoticed.

For the next few years he enjoyed a handsome pension from the government and refrained from all satirical writing. He again resumed his old style in 1844. and a collection of 24 satires entitled "Nouvelle Némésis" was published in 1845, but, apparently, without the former success. From that date he contented himself with occasional poems. Barthélemy died on 23 August 1867 in Marseille.
