= 1793 in France =

- Decades: 1770s; 1780s; 1790s; 1800s; 1810s
- See also: History of France; Timeline of French history; List of years in France

Events from the year 1793 in France.

== Incumbents ==
- The National Convention
- The Committee of Public Safety (de facto from 6 April)

== Events ==
=== January to June ===
- 21 January – French Revolution: After being found guilty of treason by the French National Convention, Citizen Capet, former king Louis XVI, is guillotined in Paris.

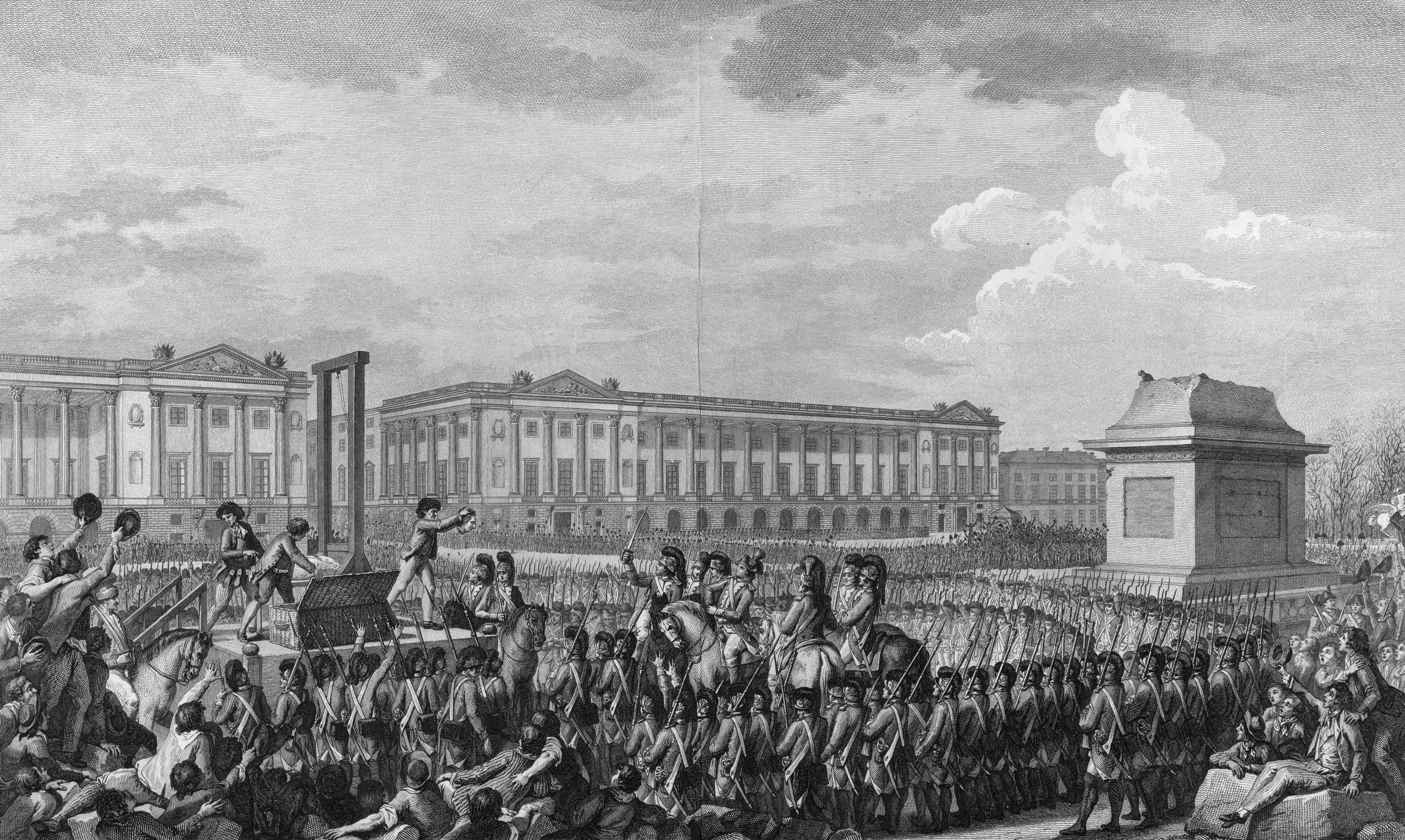
January 21: Louis XVI is guillotined in Paris.

- 1 February – French Revolutionary Wars: The French First Republic declares war on Great Britain, the Dutch Republic and (soon afterwards) Spain.
- 11 February – French expedition to Sardinia (Expédition de Sardaigne): A French fleet under admiral Laurent Truguet debarks troops near Cagliari in Sardinia.
- 22 February – French expedition to Sardinia: A small French and Corsican force briefly occupies the small Sardinian island of La Maddalena, then withdraws to Corsica. 23-year-old lieutenant Napoleone Buonaparte is second-in-command.
- 6 April – French Revolutionary Wars: The Committee of Public Safety is established in France, with Georges Danton as its head.
- 9 April – Edmond-Charles Genêt, France's new Minister to the United States, arrives at Charleston, South Carolina.
- 25 May – French expedition to Sardinia: The last French troops occupying the small Sardinian island of San Pietro surrender to a Spanish fleet.
- 31 May – French Revolution: Regular troops under François Hanriot demand that the Girondins be expelled from the National Convention.
- 2 June – French Revolution: The Girondins are overthrown in France.
- 10 June – French Revolution: The Jardin des Plantes and the Muséum national d'histoire naturelle are created by the National Convention. The museum opens in Paris the following year, and the garden houses one of the first public zoos.

=== July to September ===
- 13 July – French Revolution: Charlotte Corday kills Jean-Paul Marat in his bath.
- 17 July – French Revolution: Charlotte Corday is executed.
- 10 August – French Revolution: Feast of Unity.
  - Crowds in Paris burn monarchist emblems.
  - The Louvre in Paris opens to the public as an art museum.
- 23 August – French Revolution: The following universal conscription decree is enacted in France: "The young men shall go to battle and the married men shall forge arms. The women shall make tents and clothes and shall serve in the hospitals; children shall tear rags into lint. The old men will be guided to the public places of the cities to kindle the courage of the young warriors and to preach the unity of the Republic and the hatred of kings."
- 5 September – French Revolution: The National Convention begins the 10-month Reign of Terror.
- 13 September – Battle of Méribel
- 17 September – The Army of the Eastern Pyrenees, one of the French Revolutionary armies, defeats a Spanish force at the Battle of Peyrestortes.
- 18 September-18 December – French Revolutionary Wars: Siege of Toulon – Admiral Hood's squadron of Royal Navy ships supporting French Royalists is forced to withdraw from Toulon after a successful siege by Napoleon, taking a number of French ships – including the Lutine – with them.
- 20 September – British troops from Jamaica land on the island of Saint-Domingue to join the Haitian Revolution in opposition to the French Republic and its newly-freed slaves; on 22 September the main French naval base on the island surrenders peacefully to the Royal Navy.
- 22 September – Battle of Truillas: Spanish forces defeat the French in the Pyrenees.

=== October to December ===
- 5 October – French Revolutionary Wars: Raid on Genoa – the Royal Navy boards and captures French warships sheltering in the neutral port of Genoa.
- 15–16 October – French Revolution: Battle of Wattignies – A French Republican force commanded by Jean-Baptiste Jourdan compels a Habsburg Austrian Coalition army to retire.
- 16 October – French Revolution: Marie Antoinette, the widowed queen consort of Louis XVI, is guillotined in the Place de la Révolution in Paris at the conclusion of a 2-day trial before the Revolutionary Tribunal.

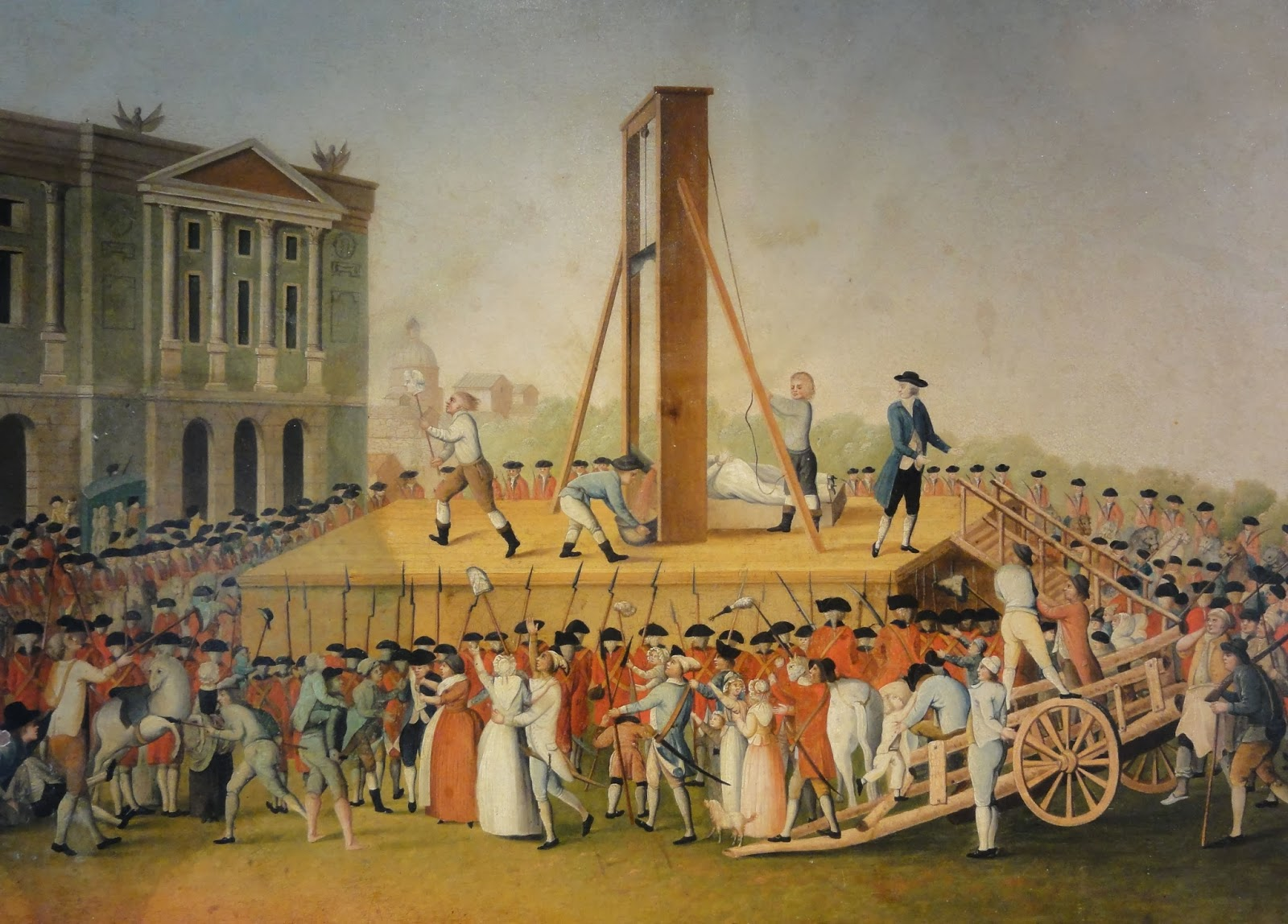
October 16: Marie Antoinette's execution

- 24 October – French Revolution: The French Republican calendar is adopted by the National Convention.
- 10 November – The dechristianization of France during the French Revolution reaches a climax with the celebration of the Goddess of Reason in the cathedral of Notre Dame de Paris.
- 12 November – French Revolution: Jean Sylvain Bailly, the first Mayor of Paris, is guillotined.
- 8 December – French Revolution: Madame du Barry is guillotined.
- 18 December – French forces under Dugommier capture Toulon from royalists and British forces under Vice Admiral Lord Hood. The British fire the dockyards and take 16 ships, one of which, the Lutine, becomes a famous treasure ship.
- 23 December – War in the Vendée: Battle of Savenay – A Republican force decisively defeats the counterrevolutionary Catholic and Royal Army, ending the Virée de Galerne.

=== Ongoing ===
- French Revolution
- French Revolutionary Wars
- War of the First Coalition

== Births ==
- 31 January – Joseph Paul Gaimard, naturalist (died 1858)
- 18 July – Maria Caroline Gibert de Lametz, stage actress, later Princess Consort and regent de facto of Monaco (died 1879 in Monaco)
- 19 August – Barthélemy Thimonnier, inventor (died 1857)

== Deaths ==
=== January to September ===
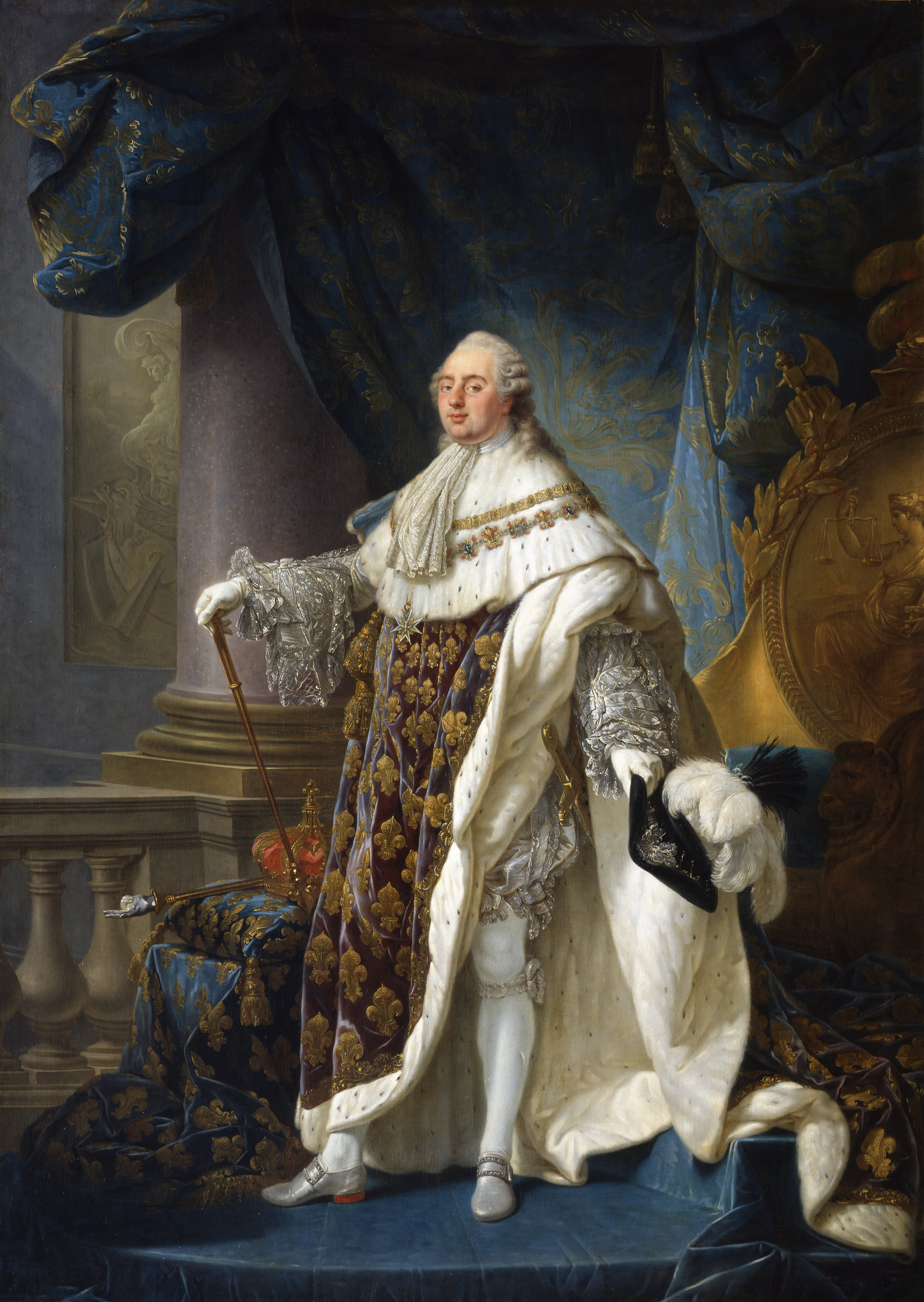
Louis XVI

- 21 January – King Louis XVI (executed) (born 1754)
- 4 March – Louis Jean Marie de Bourbon, Duke of Penthièvre, admiral (born 1725)
- 13 July – Jean-Paul Marat, French Revolutionary leader (assassinated) (born 1743 in Prussia)
- 17 July – Charlotte Corday, assassin of Jean-Paul Marat (executed) (born 1768)
- 22 August – Louis de Noailles, French peer and Marshal of France (born 1713)
- 28 August – Adam Philippe, Comte de Custine, general (executed) (born 1740)

=== October ===
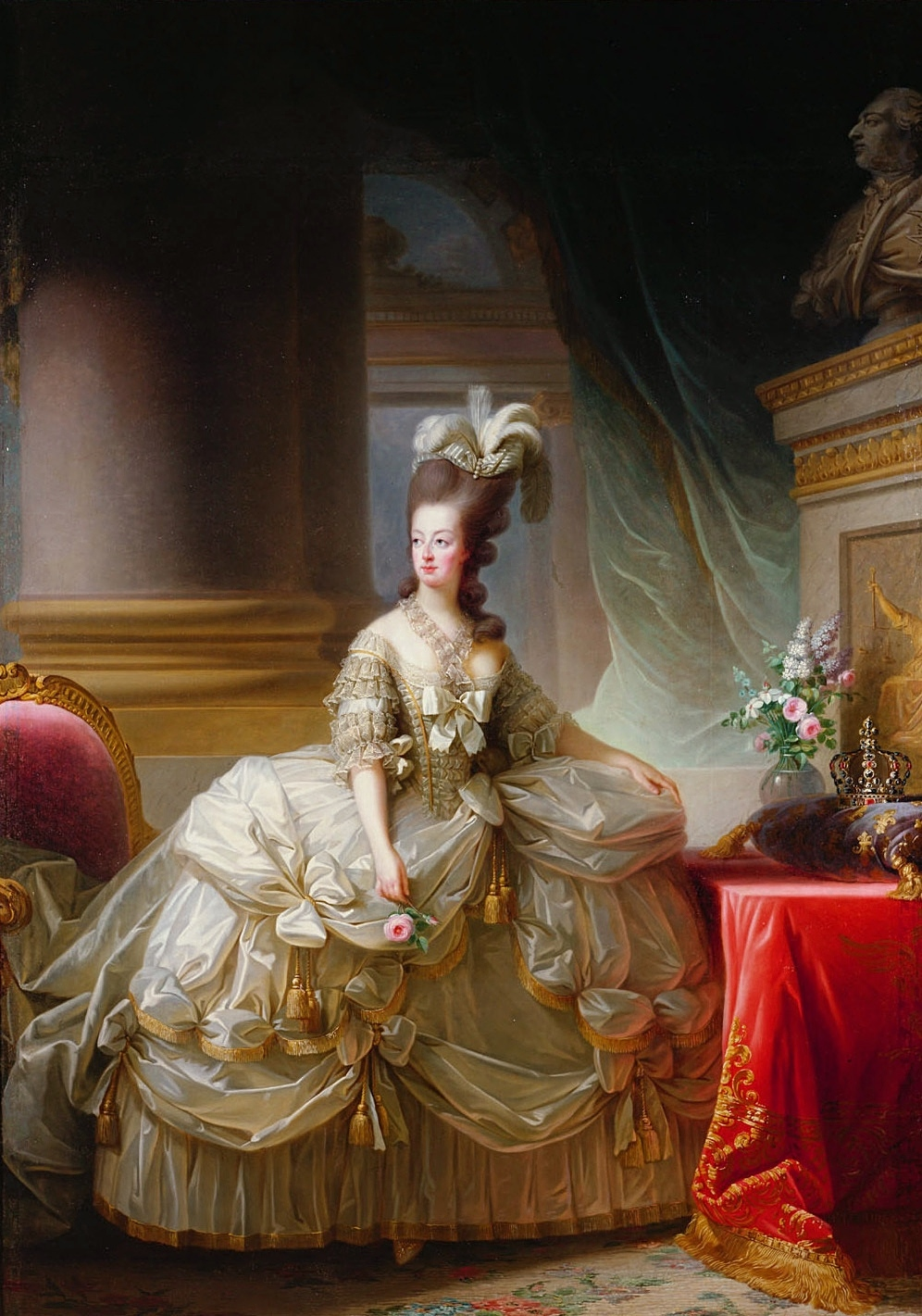
Marie Antoinette

- 7 October – Antoine Joseph Gorsas, publicist, politician (born 1752)
- 9 October – Jean Joseph Marie Amiot, Jesuit missionary (born 1718)
- 16 October – Marie-Antoinette, Queen Consort of France (executed) (born 1755 in Austria)
- 31 October
  - Pierre Victurnien Vergniaud, revolutionary leader (executed) (born 1753)
  - Claude Fauchet, revolutionary leader (executed) (born 1741)
  - Armand Gensonné, revolutionary leader (executed) (born 1758)
  - Jacques Pierre Brissot, revolutionary leader (executed) (born 1754)

=== November ===
- 3 November – Olympe de Gouges, playwright and political activist (executed) (born 1748)
- 6 November – Louis Philippe II, Duke of Orléans, noble, revolutionary leader (executed) (born 1747)
- 8 November – Madame Roland, Revolutionary hostess (executed) (born 1754)
- 10 November – Jean-Marie Roland, vicomte de la Platière, revolutionary leader (suicide) (born 1734)
- 12 November – Jean Sylvain Bailly, astronomer (born 1736)
- 24 November – Clément Charles François de Laverdy, statesman (executed) (born 1723)
- 29 November – Antoine Barnave, revolutionary leader (executed) (born 1761)

=== December ===
- 4 December – Armand de Kersaint, revolutionary leader (executed) (born 1742)
- 5 December – Jean-Paul Rabaut Saint-Étienne revolutionary leader (executed) (born 1743)
- 7 December – Joseph Bara, French Revolution child-hero (born 1779)
- 8 December
  - Étienne Clavière, financier, politician (suicide) (born 1735 in Geneva)
  - Madame du Barry, courtesan (executed) (born 1743)
- 10 December – Louis-Félix Guinement de Kéralio, French soldier and academic (executed) (born 1731)
