= 1817 in France =

- Decades: 1790s; 1800s; 1810s; 1820s; 1830s
- See also: History of France; Timeline of French history; List of years in France

Events from the year 1817 in France.

== Incumbents ==
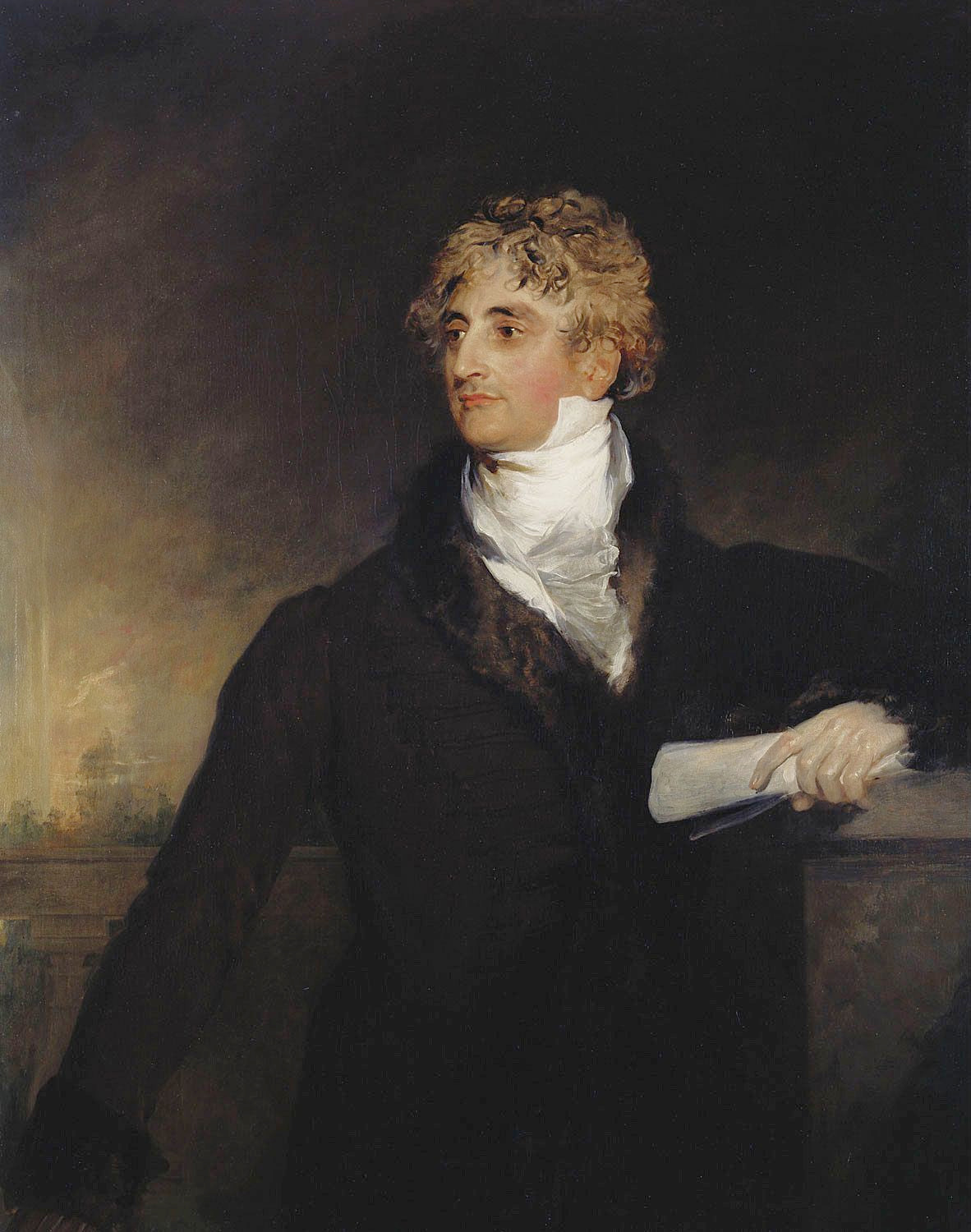
The Duke of Richelieu, French Prime Minister. 1818 portrait by Thomas Lawrence.

- Monarch – Louis XVIII
- Prime Minister – Armand-Emmanuel de Vignerot du Plessis, Duc de Richelieu

== Events ==
- 11 June - Concordat of 11 June 1817.
- Unknown date - The song "Te souviens-tu?" is written by Émile Debraux commemorating the past campaigns of Napoleon

== Births ==
- 2 January - François Chabas, egyptologist (died 1882)
- 3 February - Achille Ernest Oscar Joseph Delesse, geologist and mineralogist (died 1881)
- 15 February - Charles-François Daubigny, painter (died 1878)
- 24 February - Auguste-Alexandre Ducrot, general (died 1882)
- 6 March - Princess Clémentine of Orléans, youngest daughter of Louis-Philippe, King of the French (died 1907)
- 10 March - Claude Marie Dubuis, second Roman Catholic bishop of Texas (died 1895)
- 23 May - Gustave Thuret, botanist (died 1875)
- 31 May
  - Edouard Deldevez, violinist, conductor and composer (died 1897)
  - Joseph Marie Élisabeth Durocher, geologist (died 1860)
- 12 July - Paul-Quentin Desains, physicist (died 1885)
- 23 October - Pierre Larousse, grammarian and lexicographer (died 1875)
- 3 November - Ernest Hébert, painter (died 1908)
- 13 November - Louis James Alfred Lefébure-Wély, organist (died 1869)

== Deaths ==
- 14 January - Pierre-Alexandre Monsigny, composer (born 1729)
- 4 April - André Masséna, Marshal of France (born 1758)
- 12 April - Charles Messier, astronomer (born 1730)
- 20 June - Marie-Gabriel-Florent-Auguste de Choiseul-Gouffier, diplomat and historian (born 1752)
- 14 July - Anne Louise Germaine de Staël, author (born 1766)
- 22 July - François-Philippe Charpentier, engraver and inventor (born 1734)
- 7 August - Pierre Samuel du Pont de Nemours, writer, economist and government official (born 1739)
- 4 October - Étienne-François Letourneur, lawyer, soldier and politician (born 1751)
- 27 December - Jean Baptiste Camille Canclaux, general (born 1740)

=== Full date unknown ===
- Le Clerc Milfort, expedition leader and general (born 1752)
