= 1806 in France =

- Decades: 1780s; 1790s; 1800s; 1810s; 1820s
- See also: History of France; Timeline of French history; List of years in France

Events from the year 1806 in France.

== Incumbents ==
- Emperor – Napoleon I

== Events ==
- 6 February – Battle of San Domingo, British naval victory over French squadron.
- February – France invades the Kingdom of Naples.
- 26 February – Siege of Gaeta begins: French besiege Neapolitan forces.
- 10 March – Battle of Campo Tenese: Decisive French victory over Neapolitan forces.
- 8 April – Marriage of Stéphanie de Beauharnais, adopted daughter of Napoleon Bonaparte, to Prince Karl Ludwig Friedrich of Baden.
- 5 June – Louis Bonaparte is appointed as king of Holland by his brother Napoleon.
- 4 July – Battle of Maida: British tactical victory over French forces.
- 18 July – Siege of Gaeta ends as French artillery breaks through the city's defences.
- 6 August – Napoleon dissolves the Holy Roman Empire
- September – Prussia declares war on France, and is joined by Saxony and other minor German states.
- 9 October – Battle of Schleiz: French victory over Prussia.
- 10 October – Battle of Saalfeld: French victory over Prussian forces.
- 14 October – Battle of Jena-Auerstedt: Decisive French victory over Prussia.
- 24 October – French forces enter Berlin.
- 6 November – Battle of Lübeck: French victory over Prussian forces.
- 21 November – Berlin Decree, issued by Napoleon, forbidding the import of British goods into European countries allied with or dependent upon France.
- 24 November – The last major Prussian field force surrenders to the French near Lübeck.
- 30 November – Napoleon captures Warsaw.
- 11 December – Treaty of Poznań ends the war between France and Saxony (Prussia's ally).
- 26 December – Battle of Pułtusk: Inconclusive battle leading to Russian retreat.
- 26 December – Battle of Golymin: Russian forces disengage successfully from superior French forces.

== Births ==
- 13 January – Michel Chevalier, engineer, statesman and economist (died 1879)
- 1 February – François Jouffroy, sculptor (died 1882)
- 10 April – Juliette Drouet, actress (died 1883)
- 30 April – Charles Théodore Colet, Roman Catholic Archbishop (died 1883)
- 21 July – Louis Victor Leborgne, also known as Tan, patient of Paul Broca (died 1861)
- 12 August – Adolphe Granier de Cassagnac, journalist and politician (died 1880)
- 28 October – Alphonse Pyrame de Candolle, botanist (died 1893)
- 3 December – Jacques-Marie-Achille Ginoulhiac, Bishop (died 1875)

== Deaths ==
- 2 February – Nicolas-Edme Rétif, novelist (born 1734)
- 22 April – Pierre-Charles Villeneuve, naval officer, probable suicide (born 1763)
- 23 June – Mathurin Jacques Brisson, zoologist and natural philosopher (born 1723)
- 22 August – Jean-Honoré Fragonard, painter and printmaker (born 1732)
- 23 August – Charles-Augustin de Coulomb, physicist (born 1736)
- 9 September – Gui-Jean-Baptiste Target, lawyer and politician (born 1733)
