= 1740 in France =

- Decades: 1720s; 1730s; 1740s; 1750s; 1760s
- See also: History of France; Timeline of French history; List of years in France

Events from the year 1740 in France.

== Incumbents ==
- Monarch – Louis XV

== Events ==
- Vincennes porcelain factory established.
- Approximate date − The mystical tradition called Martinism is established as a masonic high-degree order.

== Births ==
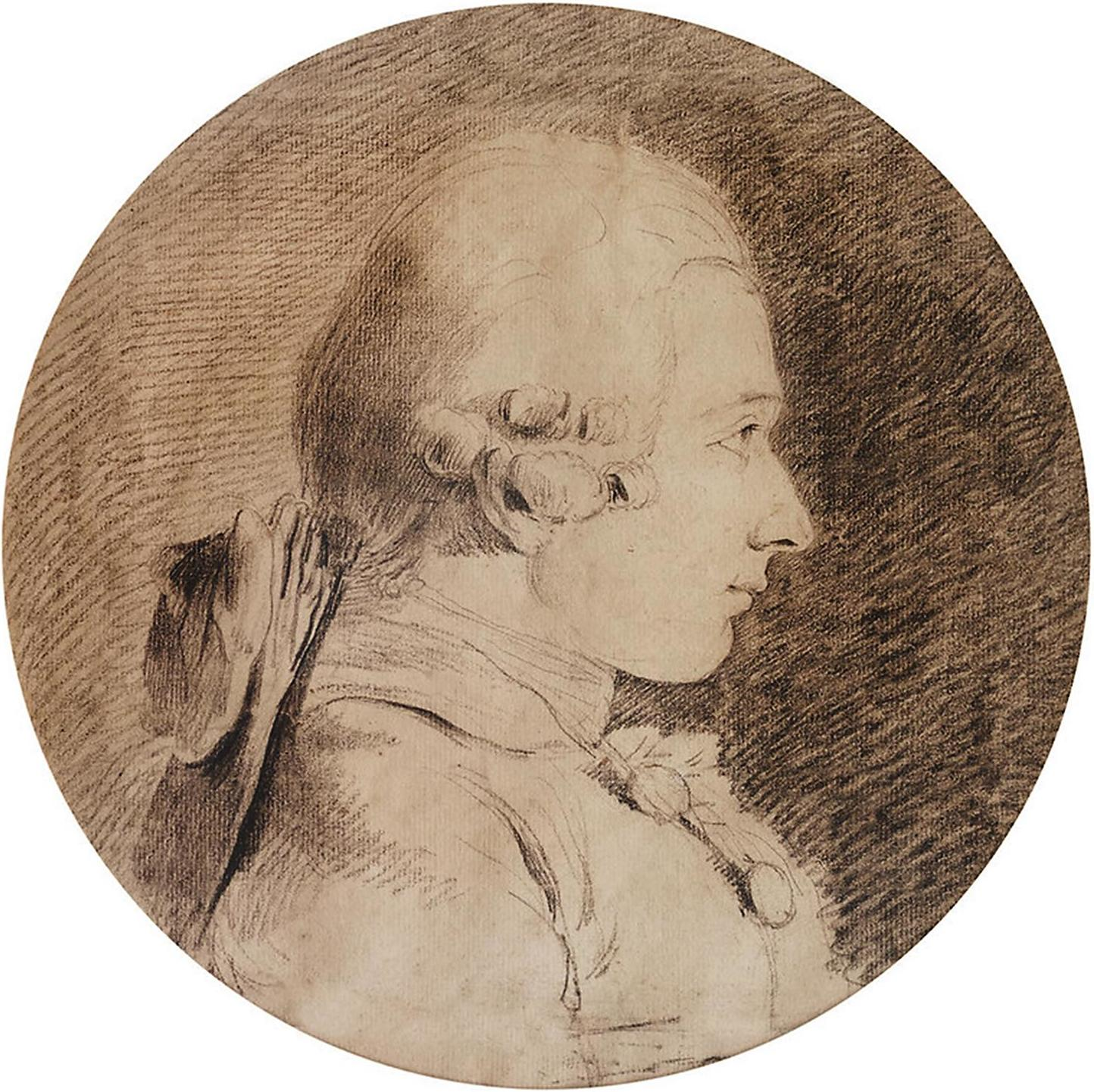
Marquis de Sade

- 12 April − Claude André Deseine, sculptor (d. 1823)
- 26 April − Jean-Jacques Paulet, mycologist (d. 1826)
- 2 June − Marquis de Sade, nobleman, revolutionary politician, philosopher and writer (d. 1814)
- 6 June − Louis-Sébastien Mercier, dramatist and writer (d. 1814)
- 10 July − Louis-Étienne Ricard, politician (d. 1840)
- 27 July − Jeanne Baret, first woman to circumnavigate the globe (d. 1807)

=== Full date unknown ===
- Catherine Éléonore Bénard, noble (d. 1769)
- François Cointeraux, architect (d. 1830)
- Jean Baptiste François de La Villéon, vice-admiral

== Deaths ==
- 27 January − Louis Henri, Duke of Bourbon, Prime Minister of France (born 1692)
- 15 February − Nicolas Prosper Bauyn d'Angervilliers, politician (born 1675)
- 2 March − John Gagnier, orientalist (born 1670?)
- July − Jacques Barbel, French soldier in Canada (born c.1670)

=== Full date unknown ===
- Jacques Cassard, naval officer (born 1679)
- Pierre Crozat, art collector (born 1665)
- Jean Soanen, bishop (born 1647)
