= 1750 in France =

- Decades: 1730s; 1740s; 1750s; 1760s; 1770s
- See also: History of France; Timeline of French history; List of years in France

Events from the year 1750 in France.

== Incumbents ==
- Monarch – Louis XV

== Events ==
- 16 May – Two weeks after police in Paris arrest six teenagers for gambling in the suburb of Saint-Laurent, rioting breaks out when a rumor spreads that plainclothes policemen are hauling off small children between the ages of five and ten years old, in order to provide blood to an ailing aristocrat. Over the next two weeks, rioting breaks out in other sections of the city. Police are attacked, including one who is beaten to death by the mob, until order is restored and police reforms are announced.
- 20 August – French astronomer Nicolas-Louis de Lacaille, by way of the Foreign Minister, the Marquis de Puisieulx and Netherlands ambassador to Paris Mattheus Lestevenon, sends a letter that ultimately persuades the States-General of the Dutch Republic to allow and partially finance Lacaille's stellar trigonometry mission to the Cape of Good Hope. The expedition departs Lorient on 21 October.
- 14 October – Display of 110 paintings from the royal art collection at the Luxembourg Palace in Paris is arranged by Abel-François Poisson, the Marquis de Marigny, origin of both the Louvre museum and Musée du Luxembourg.
- École Militaire established.
- The learned society Académie de Stanislas founded.

== Births ==
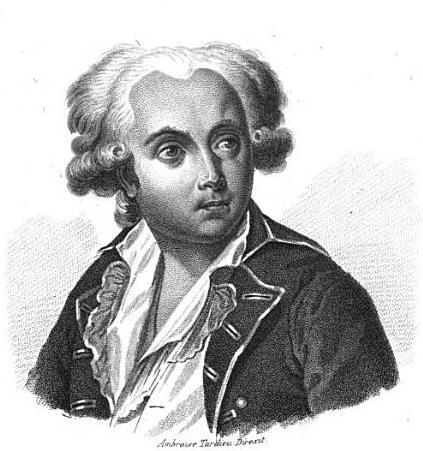
Nicolas Bergasse

- 24 January – Nicolas Bergasse, lawyer, philosopher and politician (died 1832)
- 20 May – Stephen Girard, French-born, naturalized American, philanthropist and banker (died 1831)
- 5 December – Pierre-Henri de Valenciennes, painter (died 1819)
- 8 December – Gabriel-Taurin Dufresse, bishop (died 1815)

=== Full date unknown ===
- Thérèse Caval, French revolutionary (died 1795)

== Deaths ==
- 3 April – Nicolas Antoine II Coulon de Villiers, military officer (born 1708)
- 20 April – Jean Louis Petit, surgeon (born 1674)
- 31 July – Juste-Aurèle Meissonnier, goldsmith, sculptor, painter, architect, and furniture designer (born 1695)
- 20 November – Louise Adélaïde de Bourbon, princess (born 1696)
