= 1749 in France =

- Decades: 1720s; 1730s; 1740s; 1750s; 1760s
- See also: History of France; Timeline of French history; List of years in France

Events from the year 1749 in France.

== Incumbents ==
- Monarch – Louis XV

== Births ==
=== Full date unknown ===
- Louis-Pierre Deseine – sculptor (died 1822)

== Deaths ==
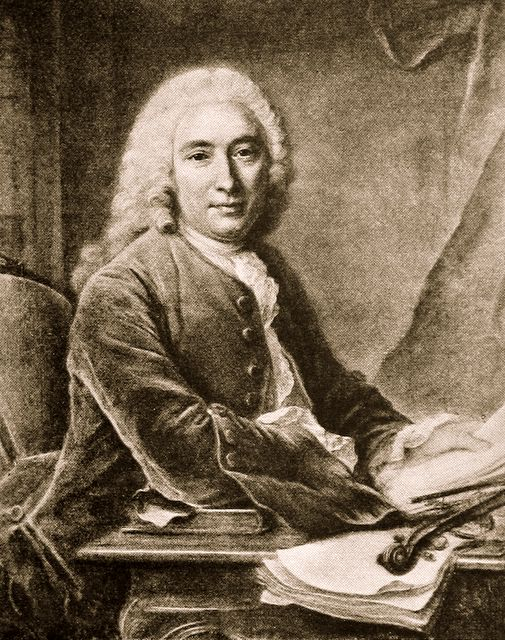
André Cardinal Destouches

- 7 February – André Cardinal Destouches, composer (born 1672)
- 28 May – Pierre Subleyras, painter (born 1699)
- 12 July – Charles de la Boische, Marquis de Beauharnois, naval officer (born 1671)
- 19 July – Armand Gaston Maximilien de Rohan, churchman and politician (born 1674)
- 13 November – Louis Marie, Duke of Rambouillet, prince (born 1746)

=== Full date unknown ===
- Madeleine Leroy, industrialist (born 1685)
