= 1735 in France =

- Decades: 1710s; 1720s; 1730s; 1740s; 1750s
- See also: History of France; Timeline of French history; List of years in France

Events from the year 1735 in France.

== Incumbents ==
- Monarch: Louis XV

== Events ==
- Quebec: Construction begins on the Chemin du roy between Quebec and Montreal.
- Niderviller pottery established.

== Births ==
- 27 January – Étienne Clavière, financier and politician (d. 1793)
- 28 February – Alexandre-Théophile Vandermonde musician and chemist (d. 1796)
- 31 December – J. Hector St. John de Crèvecœur, writer on America (d. 1813)
