= 1737 in France =

- Decades: 1710s; 1720s; 1730s; 1740s; 1750s
- See also: History of France; Timeline of French history; List of years in France

Events from the year 1737 in France.

== Incumbents ==
- Monarch: Louis XV

== Events ==
- February 20 – Foreign Minister Germain Louis Chauvelin is dismissed by Louis XV's Chief Minister, Cardinal André-Hercule de Fleury.
- February 27 – Scientists Henri-Louis Duhamel du Monceau and Georges-Louis Leclerc de Buffon publish the first study on dendrochronology.
- March 16 – In Paris, representatives sign an armistice bringing an end to the Spanish–Portuguese War (1735–1737).
- April 5 – Jesuit priest Jean-François Régis is canonized as Saint Regis by the Roman Catholic Church under the reign of Pope Clement XII.

== Births ==
- January 18 – Jacques-Henri Bernardin de Saint-Pierre, botanist (d. 1814)
- February 12 – Henriette Anne Louise d'Aguesseau, salon hostess (d. 1794)
- Marie-Catherine de Maraise, businesswoman (d. 1822)
- Anne Couppier de Romans, royal mistress (d. 1808)
- Marguerite Du Londel, ballerina (d. 1804 in Sweden)

== Deaths ==
- June 4 – François Lemoyne, rococo painter (b. 1688)
- December 27 – Victor-Marie d'Estrées, marshal (b. 1660)
