= 1683 in France =

- Decades: 1660s; 1670s; 1680s; 1690s; 1700s
- See also: History of France; Timeline of French history; List of years in France

Events from the year 1683 in France.

== Incumbents ==
- Monarch: Louis XIV

== Births ==
- 4 February – Jean-Baptiste Bénard de la Harpe, explorer of North America (d. 1765)
- 28 February – René Antoine Ferchault de Réaumur, scientist (d. 1757)
- 23 June – Etienne Fourmont, orientalist (d. 1745)
- 25 September – Jean-Philippe Rameau, composer (d. 1764)

== Deaths ==
- 10 July – François-Eudes de Mézeray, French historian (b. 1610)
- 30 July – Maria Theresa of Spain, first wife of Louis XIV (b. 1638)
- 6 September – Jean-Baptiste Colbert, French minister of finance (b. 1619)
