= 1685 in France =

- Decades: 1660s; 1670s; 1680s; 1690s; 1700s
- See also: History of France; Timeline of French history; List of years in France

Events from the year 1685 in France.

== Incumbents ==
- Monarch – Louis XIV

== Events ==
- 22 October – Louis XIV issues the Edict of Fontainebleau, which revokes the Edict of Nantes and declares Protestantism illegal, thereby depriving Huguenots of civil rights. Their Temple de Charenton-le-Pont is immediately demolished.
- The decree Code Noir, passed by King Louis XIV, defines the conditions of slavery in the French colonial empire.
- French colonization of Texas.

== Births ==
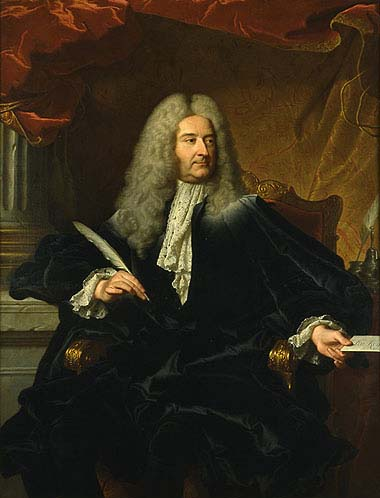
Germain Louis Chauvelin

- 6 January – Martin Bouquet, Benedictine and historian (died 1754)

=== Full date unknown ===
- Germain Louis Chauvelin, politician (died 1762)
- Marie Adélaïde of Savoy, princess (died 1712)
- Madeleine Leroy, industrialist (died 1749)

== Deaths ==
- 9 February – Pierre Bourdelot, physician, anatomist, freethinker, abbé and libertine (born 1610)
- 25 March – Nicolas Robert, miniaturist and engraver (born 1614)
- 30 October – Michel Le Tellier, statesman (born 1603)
- 5 November – Jean de Montpezat de Carbon, bishop (born 1605)
- 28 November – Nicolas de Neufville de Villeroy, nobleman (born 1598)
- 25 December – Jacob Spon, archaeologist (born 1647)
