= 1744 in France =

- Decades: 1720s; 1730s; 1740s; 1750s; 1760s
- See also: History of France; Timeline of French history; List of years in France

Events from the year 1744 in France.

== Incumbents ==
- Monarch – Louis XV

== Events ==
- 30 September – Battle of Madonna dell'Olmo
- Planned French invasion of Britain

== Births ==
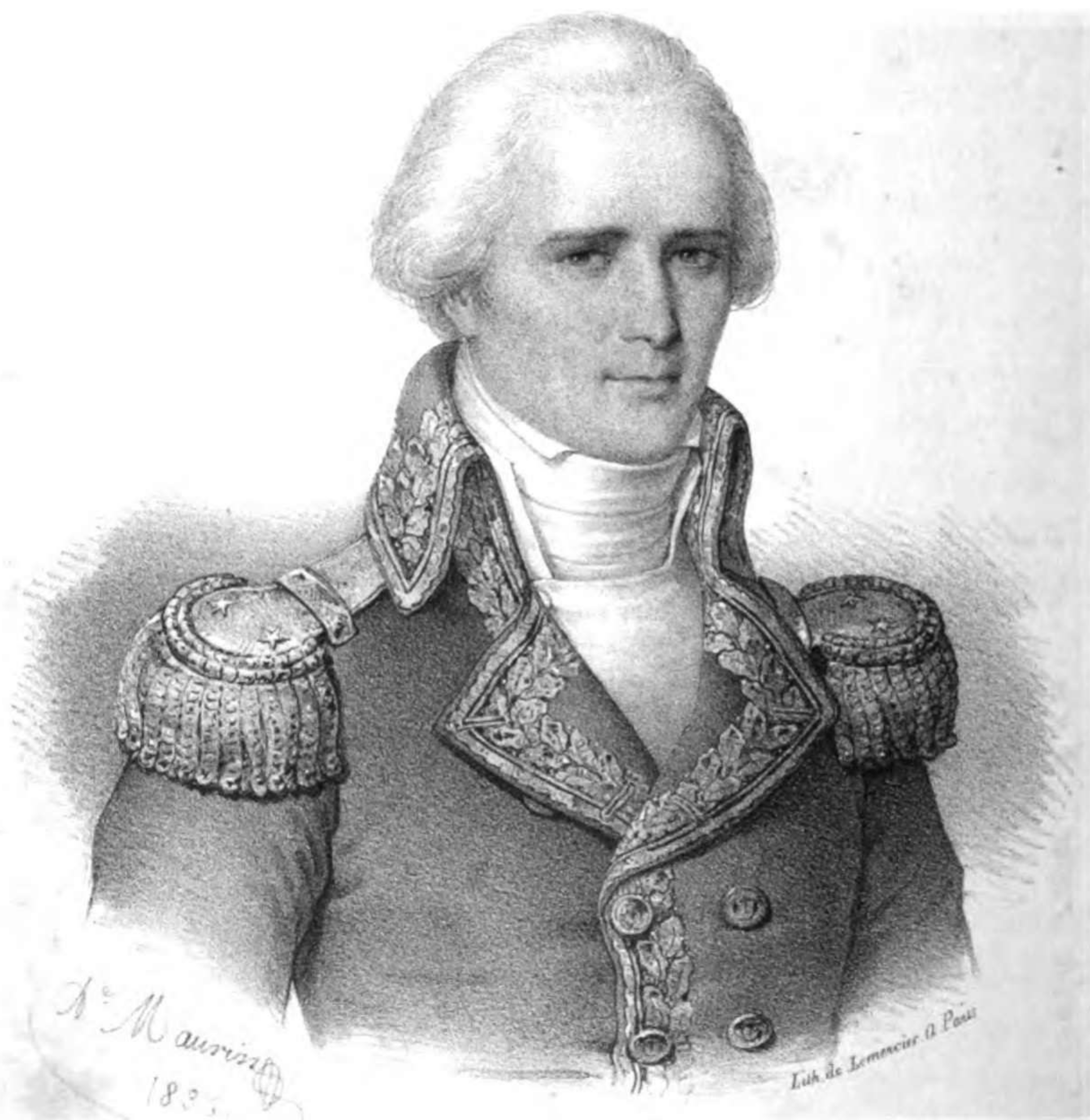
Pierre Jean Van Stabel

- 8 October – Marc Marie, Marquis de Bombelles, diplomat (died 1822)
- 8 November – Pierre Jean Van Stabel, naval officer (died 1797)

=== Full date unknown ===
- Jean-Jacques Boisard, fabulist (died 1833)

== Deaths ==
- 13 February – Pierre Gobert, painter (born 1662)
- 29 June – André Campra, composer and conductor (born 1660)
- 17 July – Charles d'Orléans de Rothelin, clergyman (born 1691)
- 10 August – Marc Marie, Marquis de Bombelles, clergyman (born 1677)
