= 1738 in France =

- Decades: 1710s; 1720s; 1730s; 1740s; 1750s
- See also: History of France; Timeline of French history; List of years in France

Events from the year 1738 in France.

== Incumbents ==
- Monarch – Louis XV

== Events ==
- 18 November – Signing of the Treaty of Vienna

== Births ==
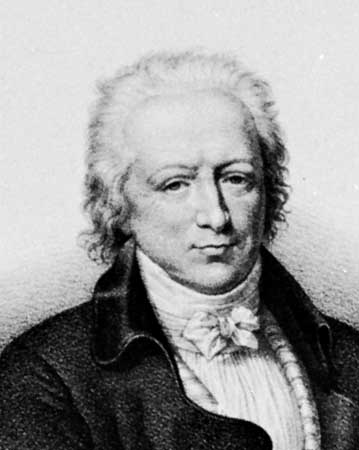
Stanislas de Boufflers

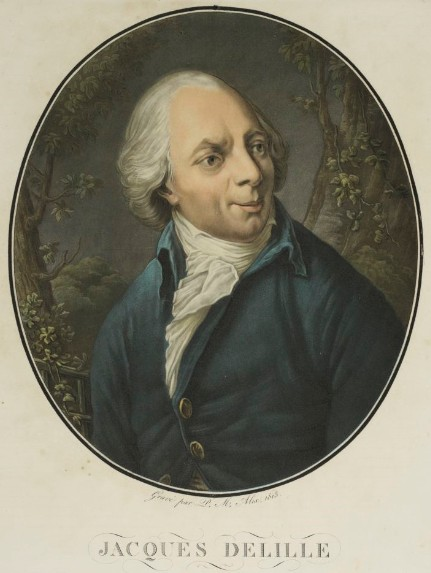
Jacques Delille

- 31 May – Stanislas de Boufflers, statesman and writer (died 1815)
- 22 June – Jacques Delille, poet and translator (died 1813)
- 28 August – Etteilla, occult cartomancer (died 1791)

=== Full date unknown ===
- Philippe-Étienne Lafosse, veterinarian (died 1820)

== Deaths ==
- 6 January – Jean-Baptiste Labat, clergyman, botanist and writer (born 1663)
- 15 January – Claude de Beauharnais, nobleman (born 1680)
- 30 January – Benoît de Maillet, diplomat and natural historian (born 1656)
- 9 February – Béatrice Hiéronyme de Lorraine, Abbess of Remiremont (born 1662)
- 5 June – Isaac de Beausobre, exiled Protestant pastor (born 1659)
- 7 June – Antoine Crozat, proprietary owner of French Louisiana (born c.1655)
- 8 July – Jean-Pierre Nicéron, lexicographer (born 1685)

=== Full date unknown ===
- De Lafontaine, ballerina (born 1655)
- Jean-Louis d'Usson, ambassador (born 1672)
