= 1684 in France =

- Decades: 1660s; 1670s; 1680s; 1690s; 1700s
- See also: History of France; Timeline of French history; List of years in France

Events from the year 1684 in France.

== Incumbents ==
- Monarch – Louis XIV

== Events ==
- 15 August – Signing of the Truce of Ratisbon
- The Hall of Mirrors at the Palace of Versailles, designed by Jules Hardouin Mansart, is completed
- The Château de Marly in the Marly-le-Roi commune is completed for Louis XIV
- The Canal de l'Eure with its notable aqueduct, designed by the military engineer Lieutenant Général Vauban to serve Versailles for Louis XIV, is begun; work is abandoned about 1690

== Births ==
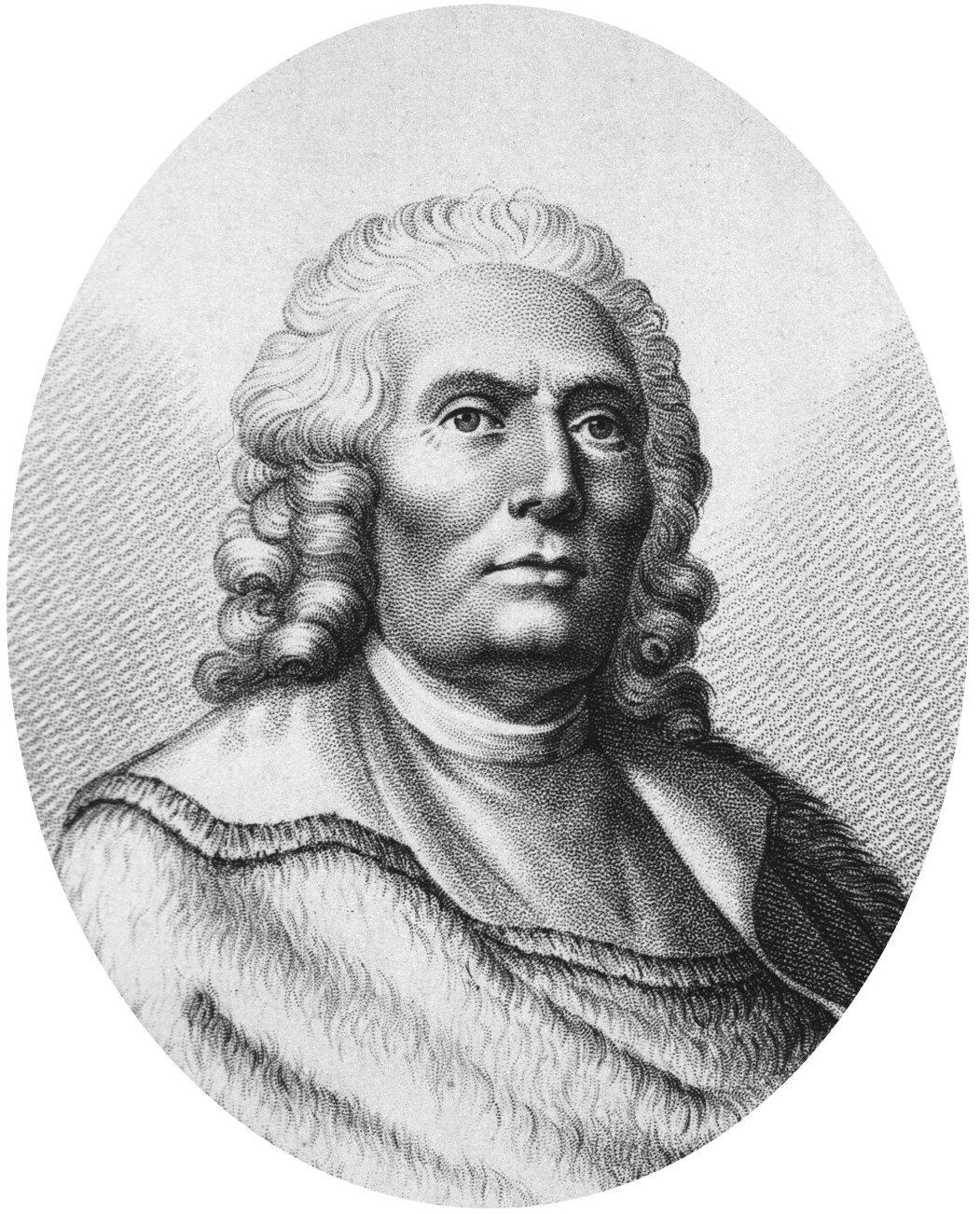
Jean Astruc

=== Full date unknown ===
- Jean Astruc, physician and professor (died 1766)

== Deaths ==
=== Full date unknown ===
- Anne de La Vigne, natural philosopher (born 1634)
- Claude Bazin de Bezons, lawyer and politician (born 1617)
- Marguerite, Duchess of Rohan, noblewoman (born 1617)
- Pierre Corneille, playwright (born 1606)
- François Pallu, bishop (born 1626)
- Peter du Moulin, clergyman (born 1601)
- Antoine Gombaud, writer (born 1607)
- Edme Mariotte, physicist (born c.1620)
- Gabriel de Guilleragues, politician (born 1628)
