= 1687 in France =

- Decades: 1660s; 1670s; 1680s; 1690s; 1700s
- See also: History of France; Timeline of French history; List of years in France

Events from the year 1687 in France.

== Incumbents ==
- Monarch – Louis XIV

== Events ==
- March – Embassy of Loubère-Céberet to Siam, consisting of a French expeditionary force of 1,361 soldiers, missionaries, envoys and crews aboard five warships.
- Fort Denonville established

== Births ==
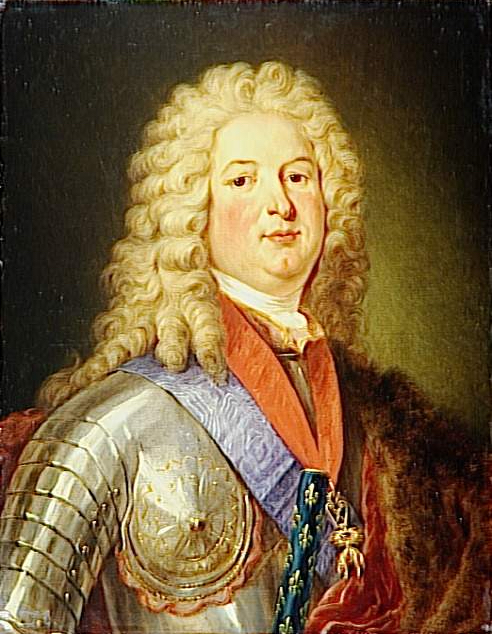
Philippe Charles de La Fare

- 15 February – Philippe Charles de La Fare, a Marshal of France (d. 1752)
- 8 May – Jean Henri Desmercières, French-Danish merchant, banker and landowner (d. 1778)

== Deaths ==
- 18 March – François Collignon, engraver, print-seller and publisher (born c.1609)
- 19 March – René-Robert Cavelier, Sieur de La Salle, explorer (b. 1643)
- 6 November – Charles de Grimaldi-Régusse, aristocrat, landowner and politician (b. 1612)
