= 1688 in France =

- Decades: 1660s; 1670s; 1680s; 1690s; 1700s
- See also: History of France; Timeline of French history; List of years in France

Events from the year 1688 in France.

== Incumbents ==
- Monarch – Louis XIV

== Events ==
- January 29 – Madame Jeanne Guyon, French mystic, is arrested in France and imprisoned for seven months.
- February 28 – The French opera David et Jonathas, composed by Marc-Antoine Charpentier, is performed for the first time.
- May 17 - Louis-Hector de Callière, Governor of Montreal proposes to Louis XIV to invade New England by land and sea. The attack began in 1690.
- December 11 – Having led his army to Salisbury and been deserted by his troops, James VII and II attempts to flee to France.

== Births ==
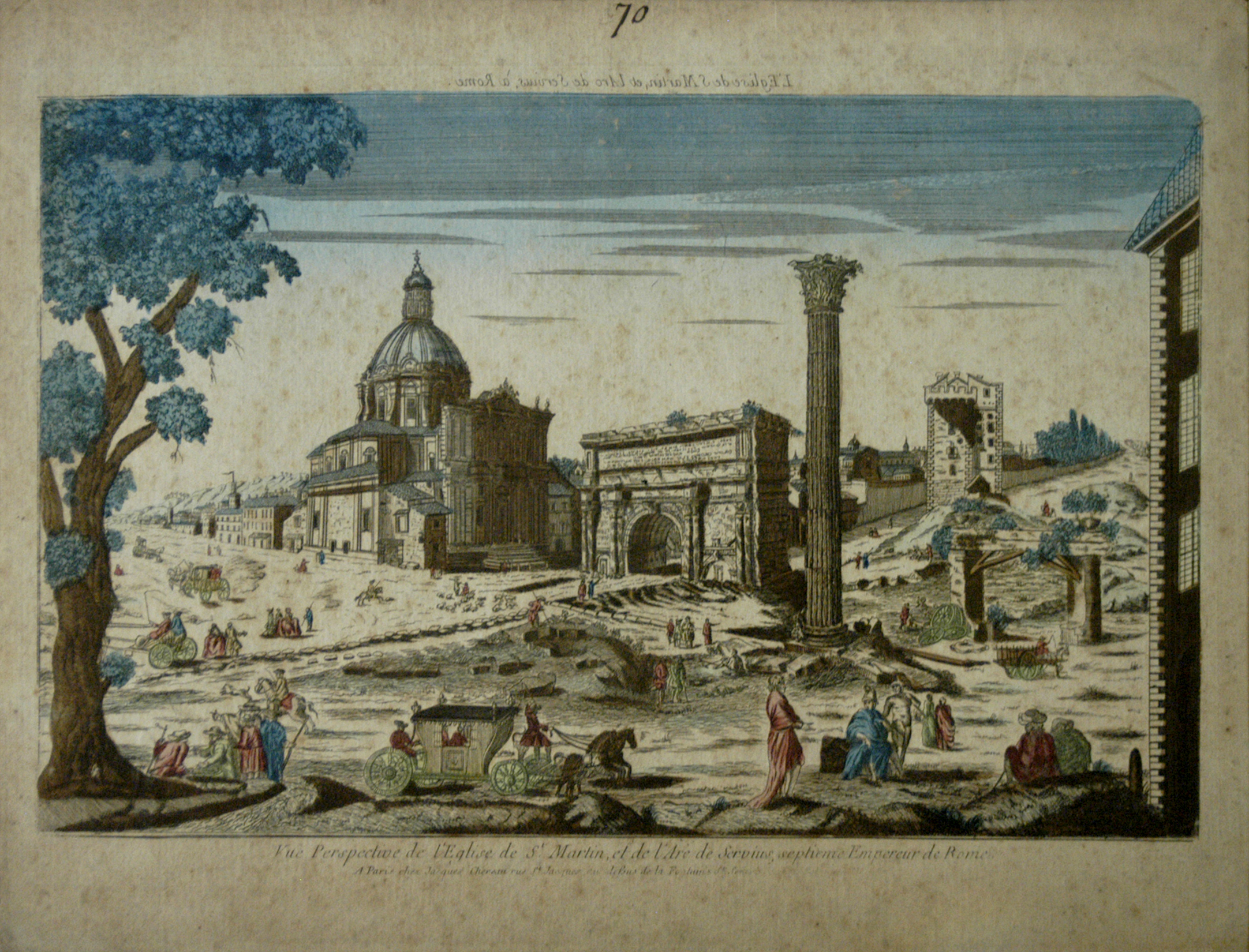
An Optical Print of The Roman Forum by Jacques Chereau

- 29 April - Charles-Nicolas Cochin the Elder, engraver (died 1754)
- 29 October - Jacques Chereau, engraver and printmaker (died 1776

== Deaths ==
- 2 February - Abraham Duquesne, naval officer (born 1610)
- 14 May - Antoine Furetière, writer (born 1619)
- 9 September - Claude Mellan, engraver and painter (born 1598)
- 9 October - Claude Perraut, architect (born 1613)
- 26 November - Philippe Quinault, librettist and dramatist (born 1635)
- Unknown - Nicolas Denys, aristocrat, explorer, colonizer and soldier in New France (born 1598?)
