= 1816 in France =

- Decades: 1790s; 1800s; 1810s; 1820s; 1830s
- See also: History of France; Timeline of French history; List of years in France

Events from the year 1816 in France

== Incumbents ==
- Monarch – Louis XVIII
- Prime Minister – Armand-Emmanuel de Vignerot du Plessis, Duc de Richelieu

== Events ==
- 8 May – Divorce is abolished by the Chambre introuvable, after having been permitted following the French Revolution.
- 2 July – French frigate Méduse (1810) runs aground off the coast of Senegal, with 140 lives lost in the botched rescue that takes weeks, leading to a scandal in the French government.
- 6 September – King Louis XVIII dissolves the Chambre introuvable, the legislature that had been elected after the Second Restoration re-established the old monarchy.
- 25 September and 4 October – 1816 French legislative election.

== Arts and culture ==
- 21 March – The Institut de France is reorganized by Louis XVIII into four royal academies: a revived Académie française; the Royal Academy of Inscriptions and Belles Lettres; the Royal Academy of Sciences; and the Académie des Beaux-Arts.

== Finance ==
- 28 April – The Caisse des dépôts et consignations, a public investment body, is created by Louis XVIII.
- Mutuelle de L'assurance contre L'incendie ("L'Anciente Mutuelle"), predecessor of Axa, the global insurance and financial services company, is founded in Rouen.

== Births ==
- 18 February – Ferdinand Dugué, poet and playwright (died 1913)
- 19 February – Louis-Guillaume Perreaux, inventor and engineer (died 1889)
- 14 July – Arthur de Gobineau, aristocrat, novelist, diplomat, travel writer and racist theorist (died 1882 in Italy)
- 4 September – François Bazin, opera composer (died 1878)
- 29 September – Paul Féval, père, novelist and dramatist (died 1887)

== Deaths ==
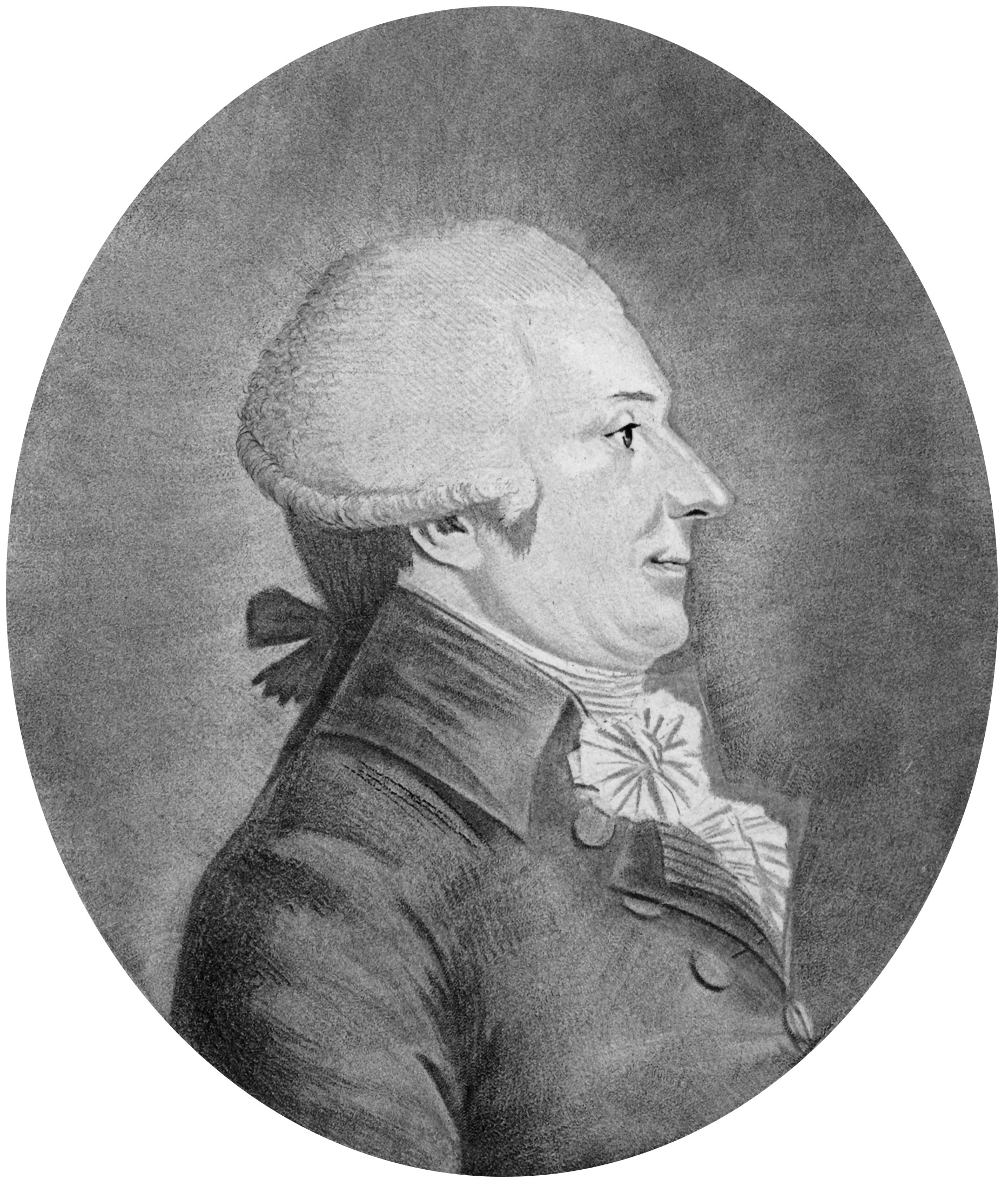
Louis-Bernard Guyton de Morveau is credited with producing the first systematic method of chemical nomenclature.

- 2 January – Louis-Bernard Guyton de Morveau, chemist and politician (born 1737)
- 16 January – Jacques-René Tenon, surgeon (born 1724)
- 31 March – Jean-François Ducis, dramatist (born 1733)
- 8 April – Julie Billiart, religious leader (born 1751)
- 28 April – Edme Mentelle, geographer (born 1730)
- 4 May – Marie-Madeleine Guimard, ballerina (born 1743)
- 7 June – Louis-Mathias, Count de Barral, clergyman (born 1746)
- 4 August – François-André Vincent, painter (born 1746)
- 7 August – François-Joseph Duret, sculptor (born 1729)
- 30 September – Joseph Caillot, actor and singer (born 1733)
- 18 October – Claude Dejoux, sculptor (born 1732)
- 21 December – Jean-Pierre-André Amar, politician (born 1755)

=== Exact date missing ===
- François-Guillaume Ménageot, painter (born 1744)
