= 1686 in France =

- Decades: 1660s; 1670s; 1680s; 1690s; 1700s
- See also: History of France; Timeline of French history; List of years in France

Events from the year 1686 in France.

== Incumbents ==
- Monarch: Louis XIV

== Events ==
- July – The League of Augsburg was founded in response to claims made by Louis XIV on the Electorate of the Palatinate in western Germany. It comprises the Holy Roman Empire, the Netherlands, Sweden, Spain and the electors of Bavaria, Saxony and the Electorate of the Palatinate.
- The Café Procope, which remains in business in the 21st century, was opened in Paris by Procopio Cutò as a coffeehouse.

== Births ==
- 6 July – Antoine de Jussieu, French naturalist (d. 1758)

== Deaths ==
- 31 January – Jean Mairet, French dramatist (b. 1604)
- 11 November - Louis II de Bourbon, Prince de Condé, French general (b. 1621)
