= 1736 in France =

- Decades: 1710s; 1720s; 1730s; 1740s; 1750s
- See also: History of France; Timeline of French history; List of years in France

Events from the year 1736 in France.

== Incumbents ==
- Monarch: Louis XV

== Events ==
- May 26 – Battle of Ackia: British and Chickasaw Native Americans defeat French troops.
- June 19 – French Academy of Sciences expedition led by Pierre Louis Maupertuis, with Anders Celsius, begins work on measuring a meridian arc in Torne Valley of Finland.

== Births ==
- February 19 – Simon Charles Miger, engraver (d. 1828)
- March 21 – Claude Nicolas Ledoux, neoclassical architect (d. 1806)
- June 14 – Charles-Augustin de Coulomb, physicist (d. 1806)
- June 22 – Auguste-Louis de Rossel de Cercy, painter primarily of naval scenes (d. 1804)
- August 26 – Jean-Baptiste L. Romé de l'Isle, geologist (d. 1790)
- September 15 – Jean Sylvain Bailly, astronomer (d. 1793)
- November 30 – Jean-Jacques de Boissieu, painter and etcher (d. 1810)
- Honoré Blanc, gunsmith (d. 1801)

== Deaths ==
- April 2 – Étienne Allegrain, topographical painter (b. 1644)
- April 24 – Prince Eugene of Savoy, French-born Austrian general (b. 1663)
- July 25 – Jean-Baptiste Pater, rococo painter (b. 1695)
- September 26 – Louise Diane d'Orléans, youngest child of Philippe II, Duke of Orleans (b. 1716)
- November 2 – Louis Antoine de Pardaillan de Gondrin, duke (b. 1664)
