= 1753 in France =

- Decades: 1730s; 1740s; 1750s; 1760s; 1770s
- See also: History of France; Timeline of French history; List of years in France

Events from the year 1753 in France.

== Incumbents ==
- Monarch – Louis XV

== Events ==
- The chemical element bismuth discovered by Claude François Geoffroy

== Births ==
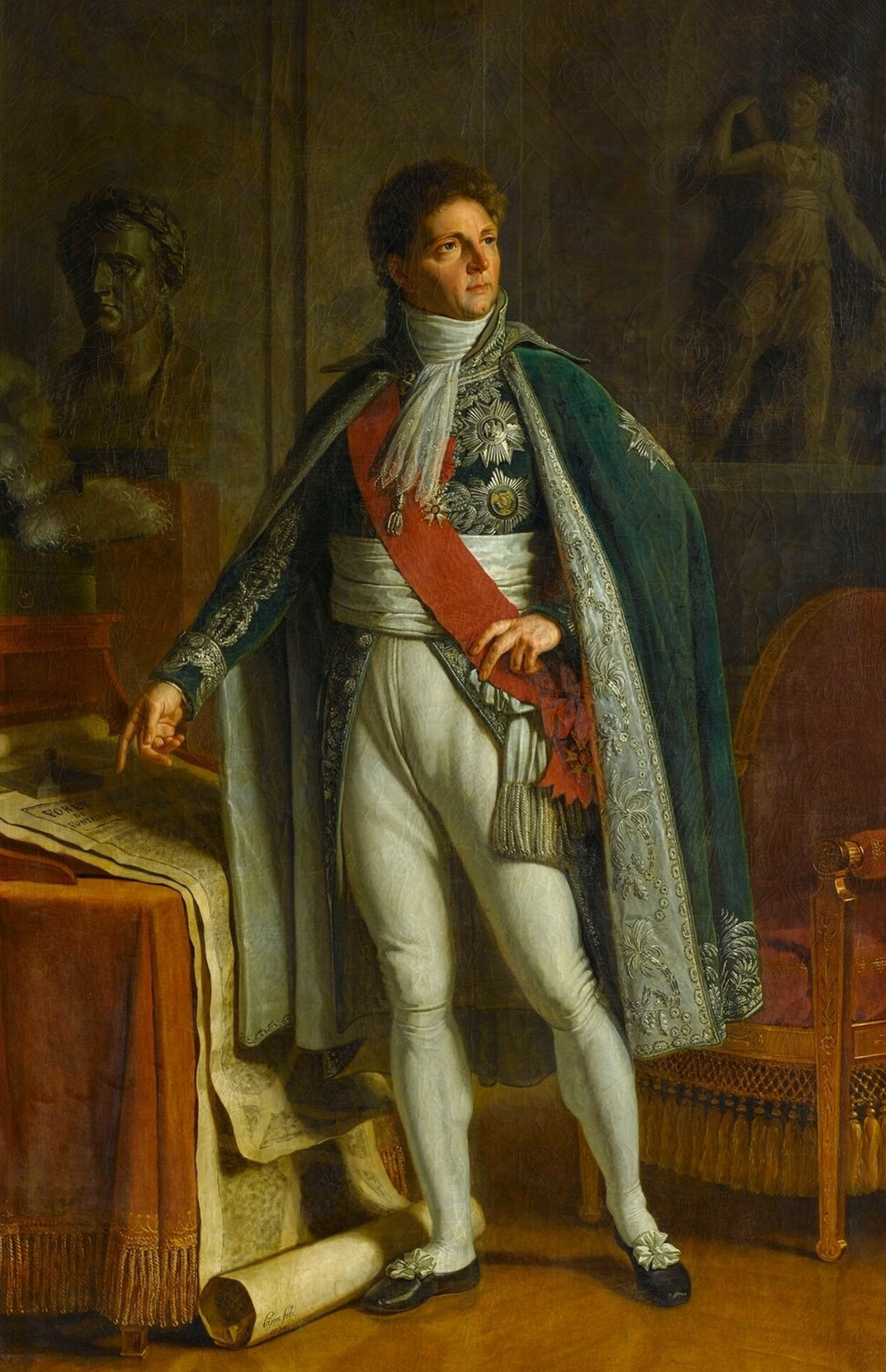
Louis-Alexandre Berthier

- 4 July –Jean-Pierre Blanchard, inventor, pioneer in balloon flight (died 1809)
- 25 July – Santiago de Liniers, 1st Count of Buenos Aires, military officer in Spanish colonial service, Viceroy of the Río de la Plata (executed 1810)
- 20 November – Louis-Alexandre Berthier, maréchal de France (died 1815)
- 23 November – Guillaume-Mathieu Dumas, military officer (died 1837)

=== Full date unknown ===
- Pierre Cuillier-Perron, military adventurer (died 1834)
- Charles Julien Fanneau de Lahorie, French sailor (died 1822)

== Deaths ==
- 18 June – Claude François Geoffroy, chemist (born 1729)
- 10 November – Bertrand-François Mahé de La Bourdonnais, naval officer (born 1699)
- 10 December – Claude Gros de Boze, scholar and numismatist (born 1680)
