= 1748 in France =

- Decades: 1720s; 1730s; 1740s; 1750s; 1760s
- See also: History of France; Timeline of French history; List of years in France

Events from the year 1748 in France.

== Incumbents ==
- Monarch: Louis XV

== Events ==
- April – Maastricht is conquered by Maurice de Saxe.
- 24 April – War of the Austrian Succession: A congress assembles at Aix-la-Chapelle (Aachen) with the intent to conclude the war.
- 18 October – War of the Austrian Succession: The Treaty of Aix-la-Chapelle is signed to end the war. Great Britain obtains Madras, in India, from France, in exchange for the fortress of Louisbourg in Canada.
- Louis XV authorizes a 5% income tax on every individual regardless of social status; the Parlement of Paris protests.

== Births ==
- 12 April – Antoine Laurent de Jussieu, botanist (d. 1836)
- 27 April – Pierre-Louis Ginguené, author (d. 1815)
- 3 May – Emmanuel Joseph Sieyès, cleric and constitutional theorist (d. 1836)
- 7 May – Olympe de Gouges, playwright and political activist (guillotined 1793)
- 10 May – Louis Pierre Vieillot, ornithologist (d. 1831)
- 30 June – Jacques Dominique, comte de Cassini, astronomer (d. 1845)
- 30 August – Jacques-Louis David, historical painter (d. 1825)
- 9 December – Claude Louis Berthollet, chemist (d. 1822)
- Rosalie Duthé, courtesan and artists' model (d. 1830)

== Deaths ==
- 7 March – Élisabeth Thérèse de Lorraine, noblewoman, Princess of Epinoy by marriage (b. 1664)
- 17 May – Henri, Duke of Elbeuf, member of the House of Lorraine (b. 1661)
- 16 June – Jean Philippe d'Orléans, illegitimate son of future regent Philippe d'Orleans (b. 1702)
- 14 August – Thomas Germain, silversmith (b. 1673)
