= 1746 in France =

- Decades: 1720s; 1730s; 1740s; 1750s; 1760s
- See also: History of France; Timeline of French history; List of years in France

Events from the year 1746 in France.

== Incumbents ==
- Monarch – Louis XV

== Events ==
- May 9 – Voltaire, on being admitted into the Académie française, gives a discours de réception in which he criticizes Boileau's poetry
- June 16 – Battle of Piacenza: Austrian forces defeat the French and Spanish (War of the Austrian Succession)
- August 12 – Battle of Rottofreddo: French forces repel an Austrial attack before withdrawing (War of the Austrian Succession)
- October 11 – Battle of Rocoux: French forces defeat the allied Austrian, British, Hanoverian and Dutch (War of the Austrian Succession)
- Jean-Étienne Guettard presents the first mineralogical map of France to the Académie des sciences
- DMC (Dollfus-Mieg & Cie.) established as a textile spinning company in Mulhouse by Jean-Henri Dollfus

== Births ==
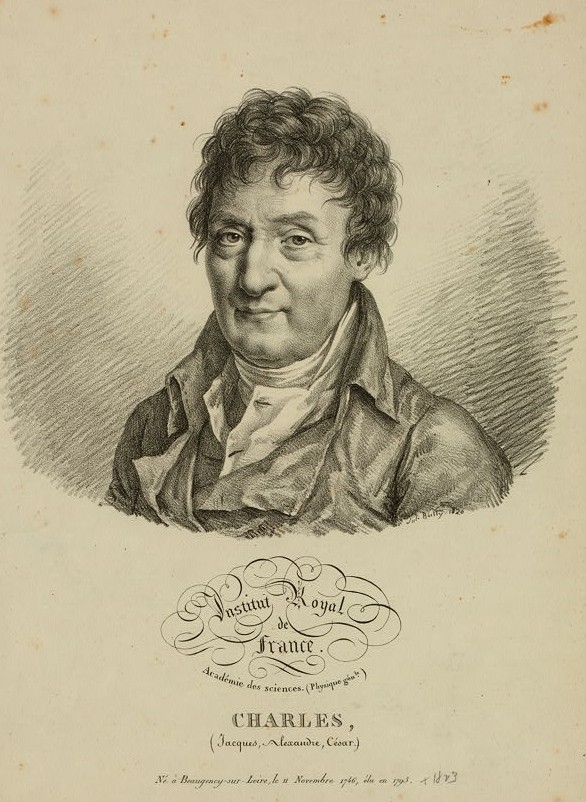
Jacques Charles

- January – Stéphanie Félicité, comtesse de Genlis, writer, harpist and educator (died 1830)
- March 7 – André Michaux, botanist (died 1802)
- March 30 – Francisco Goya, Spanish-born painter (died 1828)
- May 5 – Jean-Nicolas Pache, politician (died 1823)
- May 9 – Gaspard Monge, mathematician and geometer (died 1818)
- July 30 – Louise du Pierry, astronomer (died 1807)
- November 12 – Jacques Charles, physician (died 1823)
- Victor d'Hupay, philosopher and writer (died 1818)

== Deaths ==
- February 22 – Guillaume Coustou the Elder, sculptor and academician (born 1677)
- March 20 – Nicolas de Largillière, painter (born 1656)
- July 3 – Joseph-François Lafitau, Jesuit missionary and naturalist (born 1681)
- August 11 – Nicolas-Hubert de Mongault, ecclesiastic and writer (born 1674)
- Jacques Bonne-Gigault de Bellefonds, archbishop (born 1698)
- Michel Fourmont, antiquarian, scholar and forger (born 1690)
- Joseph d'Abbadie de Saint-Castin, military officer in Acadia (born c. 1690?)
