= Battle of Méribel =

Coordinates: 49.233661°N 0.742953°W

- Part of the Alps Campaign
Date	28 September 1793
Location	Méribel, near Sallanches
Result	French victory

Belligerents
(French First Republic) French Republic	Kingdom of Sardinia

Commanders and leaders
(French First Republic) Charles Verdelin	

The Battle of Méribel was fought on 28 September 1793 at the village of Méribel, near Sallanches in the modern French department of Haute-Savoie, during the War of the First Coalition. The forces of the Kingdom of Sardinia were defeated by the French Revolutionary Army.

== Background ==
Méribel is a hamlet in the present-day commune of Sallanches, in the department of Haute-Savoie. At the time, the territory was part of Mont-Blanc, a French department created in November 1792 after the annexation of Savoy from Sardinia. Sardinia would only recognize the loss of Savoy at the Treaty of Paris (1796).

In August 1793, a 1,000-men Sardinian army engaged in a counter-offensive in the Faucigny against French revolutionary troops. The Coalition armies crossed the Alpine passes to counter the French troops. On 21 August, a first major battle took place at the Saint-Martin bridge, near Sallanches, allowing the Sardinian army to retake the towns of Cluses (24 August) and Bonneville. This attempt to restore the rule of the House of Savoy in the region was, however, short-lived. The following month, the French recaptured the lost territories.

At Cluses on 16 September, French troops commanded by Charles Verdelin attacked the town of Sallanches, where the Sardinian Army had taken refuge. However, the French experienced difficulties in face of an organized defense, including chasseurs, who had taken up position at the Méribel redoubt. The French attack failed. A letter stated, "On 17 September, the French attacked Sallanches but without fruition because we had a good redoubt defended by the chasseurs from the Méribel heights. We also had some cannons. It is said that the enemy here lost nearly 500 of their own."

On 21 September, Verdelin demanded the population not to revolt again. Philibert Simond, who had been sent by the National Convention to accompany the Army of the Alps, had orders from the Committee of Public Safety to take reprisals against the revolting populace. Simond, being originally from the Duchy of Savoy, hesitated, but implemented a purge in Samoëns.

== Battle ==
The French army resumed the assault on Sallanches on 27 September. On the 28th they attacked the Méribel redoubt, located about 1 kilometre (0.6 mi) downstream from the town of Saint-Martin-sur-Arve. The redoubt was taken on 29 September. In the evening, the victorious troops of Verdelin and Simond entered Sallanches. 540 people were taken prisoner, while some peasants were executed by firing squad. The Sardinians retreated to the Bonhomme pass.

== Commemoration ==
On 18 September 2004, the Ligue savoisienne unveiled a plaque commemorating the defense of the valley by the Savoyards in face of revolutionary troops.
