= Paul-Quentin Desains =

French physicist

Paul-Quentin Desains (12 July 1817 – 3 May 1885) was a French physicist.

He was born at Saint-Quentin, Aisne, France. He studied literature at the Collège des Bons-Enfants in his native town and then entered the Lycée Louis-le-Grand in Paris. Here he distinguished himself, taking the first prize in physics. In 1835 he entered the science section of the Ecole Normale where his brother Edouard had preceded him. He made the acquaintance there of La Provostaye who was at the time a surveillant and who became his lifelong friend and his associate in his researches. After completing his course, he accepted a professorship in 1839 at Caen, and in 1841 returned to Paris where he received similar appointments, first at the Lycée St-Louis and later at the Lycée Condorcet, where he succeeded La Provostaye who was forced to retire on account of ill-health. His growing reputation won for him in 1853 the chair of physics at the Sorbonne which he held for thirty-two years.

Between 1858 and 1861 he made many observations in connexion with terrestrial magnetism. His most important contributions to physics, however, were his researches on radiant heat made in conjunction with La Provostaye. The two physicists concluded that radiant heat, like light, was a disturbance set up in what was then called the ether and propagated in all directions by transverse waves. They showed in a series of "Mémoires" published in the Annales de Chimie et de Physique that it manifests the characteristic phenomena of reflection, refraction, and polarization, as well as of emission and absorption. They also made a study of the latent heat of fusion of ice, and a careful investigation of the range of applicability of the Dulong-Petit law representing the law of cooling.

He also worked in connexion with the establishment and development of laboratory instruction in physics. When the Ecole pratique des hautes études was founded in 1869 he was commissioned to organize the physical laboratory. During the Siege of Paris (1870–1871), he succeeded after many difficulties in establishing electrical communication with d'Alméida who was outside the lines. The exposure he underwent brought on rheumatism which greatly weakened his constitution. He died in Paris. Desains published a Traité de Physique (Paris, 1855) and numerous articles, chiefly with La Provostaye.
