= Joseph Marie Élisabeth Durocher =

French geologist (1817–1860)

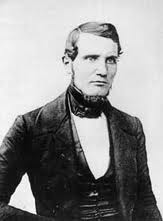

Joseph Marie Élisabeth Durocher (31 May 1817, Rennes - 3 December 1860, Rennes) was a French geologist.

Educated at the École Polytechnique and École des Mines in Paris, he qualified as a mining engineer. Early in his career he travelled in the northern parts of Europe to study the metalliferous deposits, and he contributed the articles on geology, mineralogy, metallurgy and chemistry to Paul Gaimard's Voyages de la commission scientifique du Nord de la Scandinavie, en Laponie, au Spitlberg et aux Feroe, pendant les annes 1838-1840.

In 1844 he became professor of geology and mineralogy at Rennes. His attention was now largely directed to the study of the artificial production of minerals, to the metamorphism of rocks, and to the genesis of igneous rocks. In 1857 he published his famous Essai de pétrologie comparée, in which he expressed the view that the igneous rocks have been derived from two magmas which coexist beneath the solid crust, and are respectively acid and basic.
