= 1745 in France =

- Decades: 1720s; 1730s; 1740s; 1750s; 1760s
- See also: History of France; Timeline of French history; List of years in France

Events from the year 1745 in France.

== Incumbents ==
- Monarch: Louis XV

== Events ==
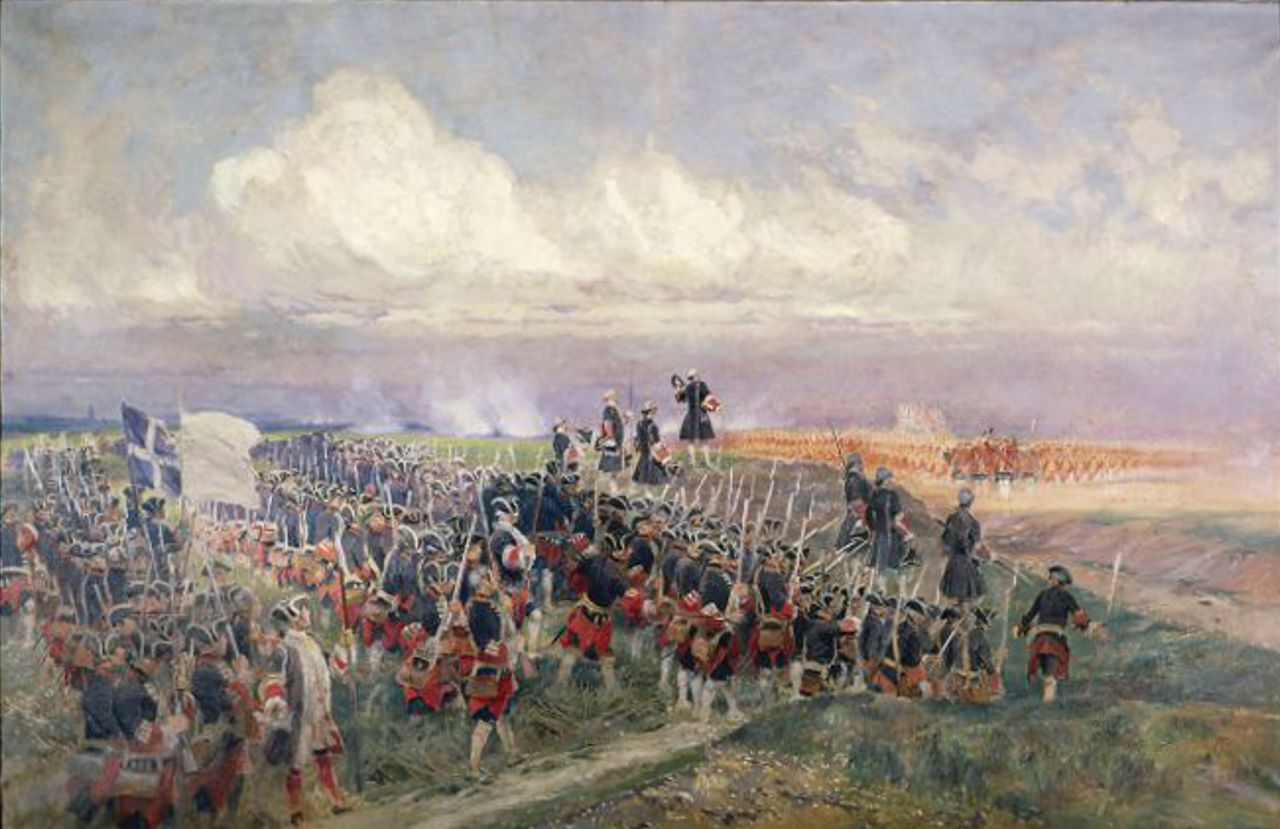
May 11: Battle of Fontenoy.

- 11 May – War of the Austrian Succession: Battle of Fontenoy – French forces defeat an Anglo-Dutch-Hanoverian army including the Black Watch.
- 9 July – War of the Austrian Succession: Battle of Melle – The French are victorious in an engagement against the Pragmatic Allies.
- 14 September – Madame de Pompadour is officially presented in the court of Louis XV.

== Births ==
- 6 January – Jacques-Étienne Montgolfier, French inventor (d. 1799)
- 20 April – Philippe Pinel, French physician (d. 1826)
- 8 July – Sara Banzet, educator and diarist (d. 1774)

== Deaths ==
- 22 May – François-Marie, 1st duc de Broglie, French military leader (b. 1671)
- 9 December – Étienne Fourmont, French orientalist (b. 1683)
- 19 December – Jean-Baptiste van Loo, French painter (b. 1684)
