= Henri Fouquet =

French physician (1727–1806)

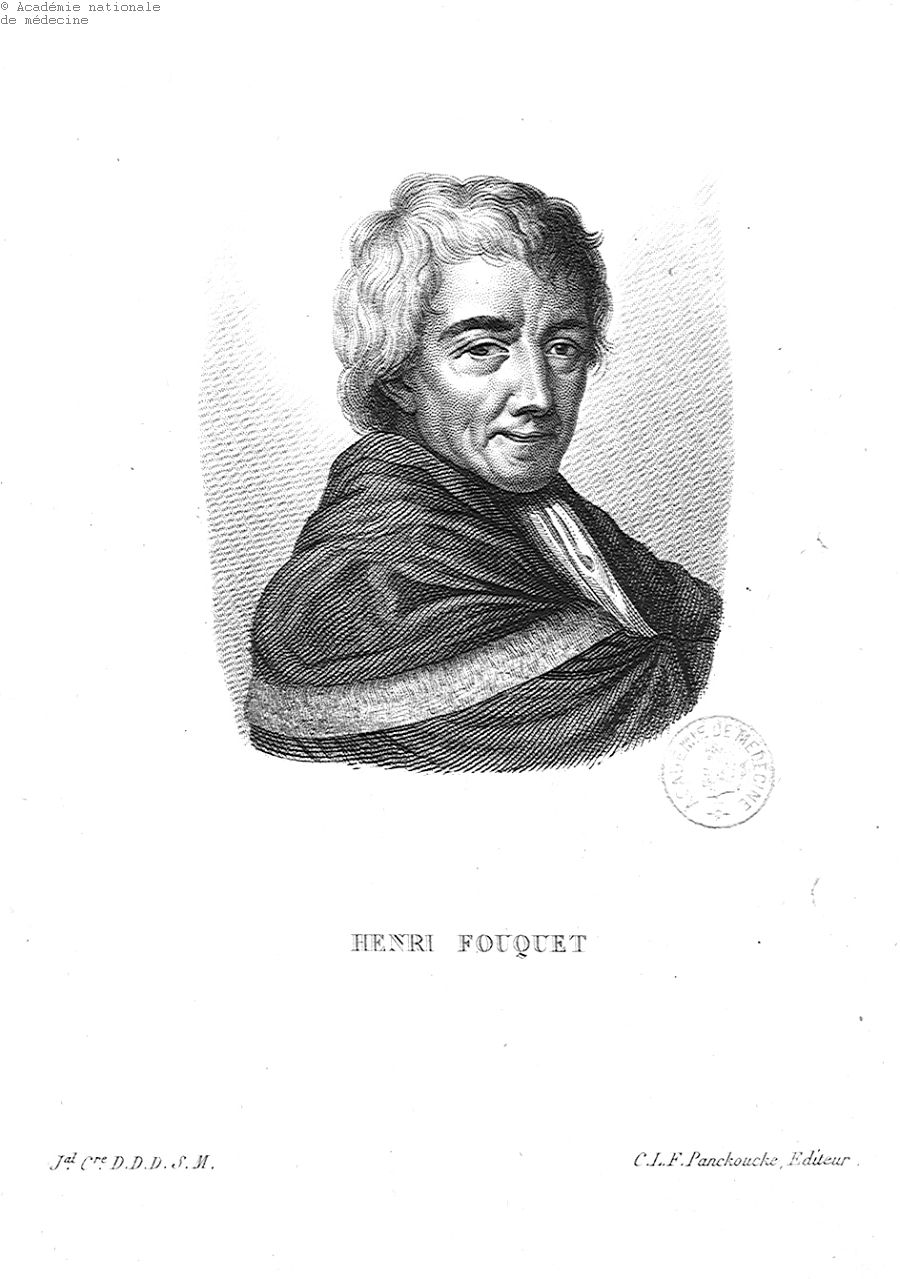
- Born: 31 July 1727; Montpellier
- Died: 10 October 1806 (aged 79)
- Occupation: Physician

Henri Fouquet (French: [ɑ̃ʁi fukɛ]; 31 July 1727 – 10 October 1806) was an 18th-century French physician.

He was a student of Gabriel François Venel at the faculté de médecine de Montpellier.

A military physician, inspector of the army of the Pyrénées-Orientales, he held the first chair of internal clinic of Montpellier from 1794 to 1803.

He collaborated with the Dictionnaire raisonné des sciences, des arts et des métiers, was a member of the Institut de France and chevalier of the Légion d'honneur (decree dated 17 July 1804).

In 1800 he went to Andalusia to analyze the variations of the pulse based on various conditions and provided graphical representations of these conditions.

== Works ==
- Wetsh, with inset comments by Henri Fouquet, Medicina ex pulsu, sive systema doctrinae sphygmicae, Vindobonae, 1770.
- Discours sur la Clinique, Montpellier, at G. Izar and A. Ricard, Imprimeurs de l’École de Médecine, An X.

== Sources ==
- Charles-Louis Dumas, Éloge de M. Fouquet. In : Bulletin de la Société libre des sciences et belles-lettres de Montpellier, Montpellier, Tournel, 1809 (supplément au n° XXXVII)
