= François Cointeraux =

French architect

- Born: 1740; Lyon
- Died: 1830 (aged 89–90); Paris
- Occupation: Architect

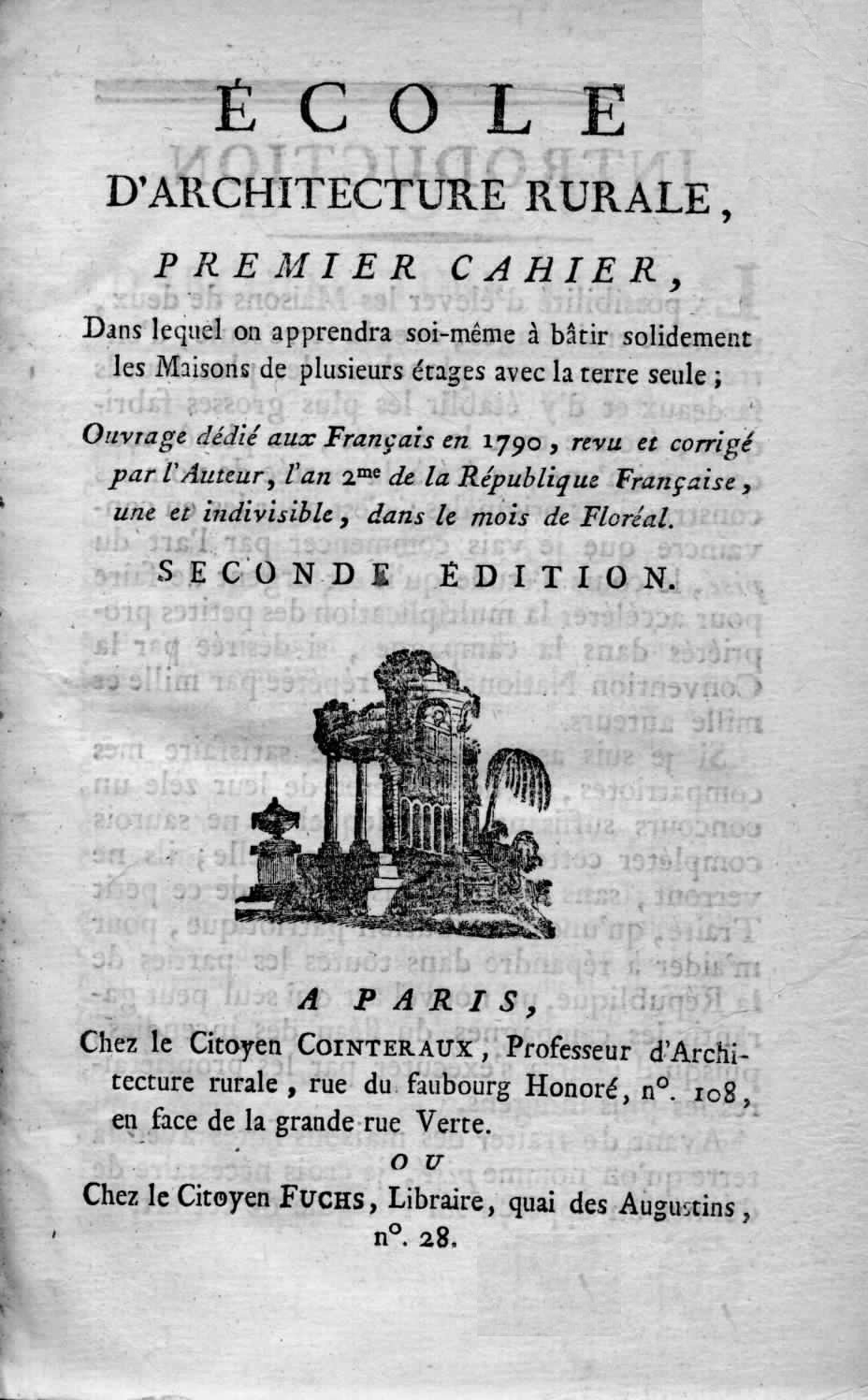
Rural Architecture School

François Cointeraux (1740–1830) was a French architect. He "discovered" pisé de terre (rammed earth) architecture in the Lyon region and promulgated its use in Paris.

Born in Lyon, he was the nephew of a master mason, with whom he learned drawing, architecture and perspective. He started working in his city of birth and in Grenoble as a construction entrepreneur and a land surveyor for Lyon until 1786, when he entered an examination of the Academy of Amiens. He was accepted in 1787, and moved to Paris the following year. There, he established several schools of rural architecture. His work at that time was mainly oriented towards the construction of incombustible rammed earth buildings built for agricultural purposes. In 1789, he was distinguished by the Royal Society of Agriculture of Paris. In year III of the revolutionary calendar, he was part of the Société des inventions et découvertes.

He was the inventor of the crécise a mechanical device allowing the production of rammed earth bricks. He derived from this device another invention, l'épurateur de légumes, allowing to dry vegetables. He also invented the pierre carton and studies concrete.

He was a productive author, producing 72 booklets relating to rammed earth construction, and these writings were translated and widely spread, helping this construction style to flourish. He was also interested in agriculture, being the first author, with Léon de Perthuis de Laillevault in 1805 and 1810, to study rural construction in the French agronomy, in an apology of rammed earth and its use. He was also interested in manufactures built in an industrial style.

He was the architect of dozens of rammed earth buildings in Lyon and its vicinity, in Grenoble, Amiens and Napoléon-Vendée, a town he was tasked to rebuild in 1807 by Emmanuel Crétet, Minister of the Interior and director of the Corps of Bridges, Waters and Forests of Napoleon. The town, destroyed during the French Revolution, was rebuilt by Cointeraux. His use of rammed earth was criticized by the Emperor, who described his work as a "city of mud", and he was accused of having wasted the means available to him.

== Published works ==
- L'école d'architecture rurale, ou Leçons par lesquelles on apprendra soi-même à bâtir solidement les maisons de plusieurs étages, avec la terre seule ou autres matériaux les plus communs et du plus vil prix (2 ed.). Lyon: l’École d’architecture rurale. 1796.
- La Ferme, prix remporté à la Société d'agriculture de Paris, le 28 décembre 1789 (3 ed.). Paris. 1796.
- Architecture périodique, ou notice des travaux et approvisionnemens que chacun peut faire, a peu de frais, chaque mois et chaque année, soit pour améliorer ses fonds, soit pour construire toutes sortes de batisses, soit pour multiplier les engrais (PDF). Paris: Bureau de l'école d'architecture rurale. 1792.
- Les Erreurs de mon siècle sur l'agriculture et sur les arts, avec le recueil de mes procédés économiques, de mes inventions et découvertes. Paris. 1793.
- Nouveau traité d'économie rurale ou Recueil de procédés, méthodes et inventions que chacun doit employer dans ses cultures et bâtisses. Saint-Mandé: École d’architecture rurale. 1803.
- Des Récoltes, méthode préservatrice pour garantir les récoltes des foins et des céréales contre l'intempérie des saisons. Paris: Brunot-Labbé. 1816.
- Traité sur la construction des manufactures et maisons de campagne. Paris. 1791.
