= 1747 in France =

- Decades: 1720s; 1730s; 1740s; 1750s; 1760s
- See also: History of France; Timeline of French history; List of years in France

Events from the year 1747 in France.

== Incumbents ==
- Monarch – Louis XV

== Events ==
- 2 July – Battle of Lauffeld
- 19 July – Battle of Assietta

== Births ==
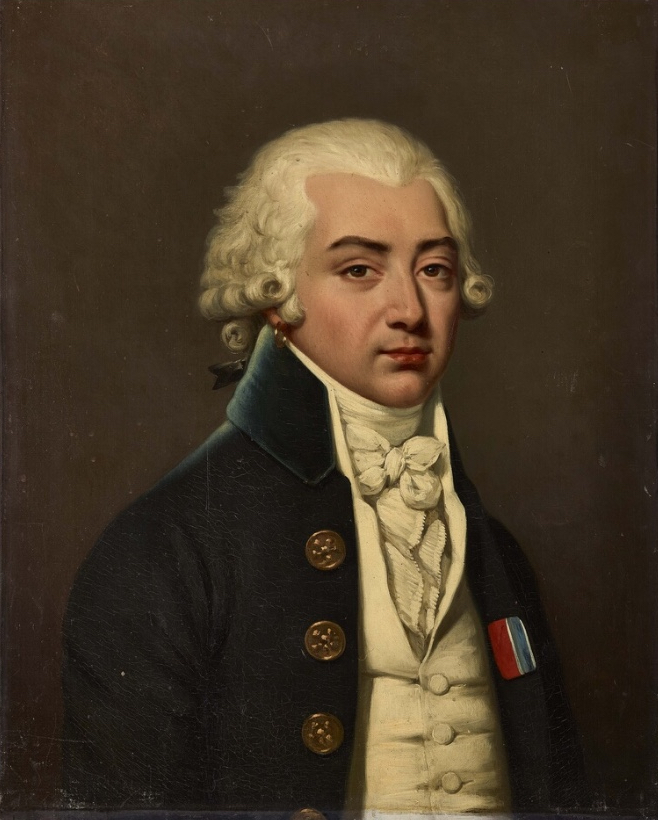
Armand Louis de Gontaut

- 23 January – Joséphine Leroux, Ursuline nun (died 1794)
- 13 April – Armand Louis de Gontaut, military officer and politician (died 1793)
- 29 May – Louis Thomas Villaret de Joyeuse, admiral (died 1812)
- 2 July – Rose Bertin, hatmaker and dressmaker (died 1813)

== Deaths ==
- 7 March – Nicholas Mahudel, antiquarian (born 1673)
- 6 June – Jean-Baptiste Barrière, cellist and composer (born 1707)
- 9 November – Philibert Orry, statesman (born 1689)

=== Full date unknown ===
- Antoine Monnoyer, painter (born 1670)
