= 1741 in France =

- Decades: 1720s; 1730s; 1740s; 1750s; 1760s
- See also: History of France; Timeline of French history; List of years in France

A list of events from the year 1741 in France.

== Incumbents ==
- Monarch – Louis XV

== Events ==
- The cavalry unit Régiment des Hussards de Saxe formed

== Births ==
=== Full date unknown ===
- Antoine-François Callet, painter (died 1823)

== Deaths ==
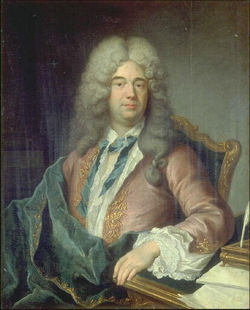
Jean-Baptiste Rousseau

- 17 March – Jean-Baptiste Rousseau, poet and dramatist (born 1671)
- 18 June – François Pourfour du Petit, anatomist (born 1664)
- 11 August – Marie Anne de Bourbon, noblewoman (born 1697)
- 25 August – Gabriel-Vincent Thévenard, singer (born 1669)
- 7 September – Henri Desmarets, composer (born 1661)
- 21 December – Bernard de Montfaucon, monk and scholar (born 1655)

=== Full date unknown ===
- Françoise Prévost, ballerina (born c.1680)
