= Jean-Jacques Boisard =

French fabulist

Jean-Jacques François Marius Boisard (Caen, 1743 – 1831) was a French fabulist.

== Biography ==
Boisard was a French fabulist born in 1743 in Caen, a historical town located in the Province of Normandy, France, about 150 kilometers from Paris. Educated by his family to be a member of the local Bar, he was appointed Secretary of the Finance Council and, in 1778, Secretary of the Chancery of "Monsieur", namely the elder brother of the king of France. With the French Revolution, he lost his post and, later on, the modest pension allocated to it.

As a member of the Royal Academy of Literature (Académie royale des Belles-lettres) of Caen, the first academy established in France after the "Académie française", he started publishing fables in 1764 in the Mercure de France. Fables were very popular in the French literature of the 18th century, the Age of Enlightenment, under the shadow of Jean de La Fontaine. In 1771, the publisher Lottin published the Fablier français, which was a compilation of texts from some hundred authors who wrote fables, since La Fontaine. This literary art dates back, at least, to Greek antiquity. Fables were usually written in verses and used animals for their symbolic value. They carry implicit or explicit messages of moral philosophy.

Facing problems due to his antirevolutionary ideas against the Republic, Boisard left Paris and returned to Caen. The city was incidentally a centre of "federalist" insurgents against the revolutionary government. One of its citizens, Charlotte Corday, in 1793, murdered a prominent leader of the Revolution, Jean Paul Marat. Boisard was, at this time, apparently not involved in politics. Up to 1805, he published several collections of fables and various works. The richness of his imagination was matchless.

At the time, he was recognized as a very respectable author. Beside the fables, he wrote some light poetry and translated several poems of Horace. Voltaire praised him, Diderot (Epitre à Boisard) dedicated one of his very few rhymed Epistle to the fabulist: "nobody has been such a charming rhyme writer ... Nobody has been such a perfect rhyme writer" ("Oncques ne fut un rimeur si charmant ... Oncques ne fut un rimeur si parfait"). It must be noticed however that modern literary critics are now of the opinion that this epistle may have been addressed to his nephew (mentioned below) since it implicitly refers to a bad fortune. For his part, Jacob Grimm, who was a close friend, considered Boisard's fables as natural and diverse, but sometimes naïve. He was quite laudatory in writing that Boisard was the fabulist who imitated the less La Fontaine, but came the closest to the master. The polemical writer Antoine de Rivarol was sarcastic in stating that Boisard's fables "have outmoded those of La Fontaine, which is always somewhat unfair" ("ont fait passer de mode celles de La Fontaine, ce qui est toujours un peu injuste!")

Boisard is one of the most prolific authors of French literature. His publications were produced over a period of 33 years (1773 to 1806). Presently, he is broadly considered as the best fabulist after La Fontaine, although his literary style, pleasant and light but sometimes inelegant, is certainly not of the same standard. In 1806, Mille et une fables (A Thousand and One Fables) was published as a compilation of at least five former editions. It was a bulky and sumptuously printed and illustrated publication, which does not seem to be available now. As with hundreds of French fabulists of that time, except La Fontaine, the work of Boisard did not really survive as centuries passed. Boisard also produced a lyrical poem, "Ode sur le déluge", which was crowned, in 1790, by the Academy of Rouen. Boisard died in his home town of Caen in 1831 or 1833.

== Works ==
First collection of Fables published in 1773, second collection in 1777, third collection in 1803, fourth in 1804, fifth in 1805. Final publication: Mille et une fables, in 1806
