= 1739 in France =

- Decades: 1710s; 1720s; 1730s; 1740s; 1750s
- See also: History of France; Timeline of French history; List of years in France

Events from the year 1739 in France.

== Incumbents ==
- Monarch: Louis XV

== Births ==
- 25 January – Charles François Dumouriez, French general (d. 1823)
- 15 February – Alexandre-Théodore Brongniart, French architect (d. 1813)
- 19 March – Charles-François Lebrun, duc de Plaisance, Third Consul of France (d. 1824)
- 20 November – Jean-François de La Harpe, French critic (d. 1803)
- 14 December – Pierre Samuel du Pont de Nemours, French politician (d. 1817)
  - Bénédict Chastanier, French surgeon (d. 1816)

== Deaths ==
- 15 January – Eléonor Marie du Maine, French Nobleman.
- 11 August – François de La Rochefoucauld, Marquis de Montandre
