= 1733 in France =

- Decades: 1710s; 1720s; 1730s; 1740s; 1750s
- See also: History of France; Timeline of French history; List of years in France

Events from the year 1733 in France.

== Incumbents ==
- Monarch: Louis XV

== Births ==
- May 4 – Jean-Charles de Borda, French mathematician, physicist, political scientist, and sailor (d. 1799)

== Deaths ==
- March 4 – Claude de Forbin, French naval commander (b. 1656)
- September 12 – François Couperin, French composer (b. 1668)
