= 1751 in France =

- Decades: 1730s; 1740s; 1750s; 1760s; 1770s
- See also: History of France; Timeline of French history; List of years in France

Events from the year 1751 in France.

== Incumbents ==
- Monarch: Louis XV

== Events ==
- 28 June – The first volume of Diderot and d'Alembert's Encyclopédie (Encyclopédie, ou dictionnaire raisonné des sciences, des arts et des métiers) is published, notably including a map of their figurative system of human knowledge.
- 3 December – Battle of Arnee in India (Second Carnatic War): A British East India Company-led force under Robert Clive defeats and routs a much larger Franco-Indian army under the command of Raza Sahib at Arni.

== Births ==
- 1 March – Amand-Marie-Jacques de Chastenet, Marquis of Puységur, mesmerist (d. 1825)

== Deaths ==
- 5 February – Henri François d'Aguesseau, Chancellor of France (b. 1668)
