= 1742 in France =

- Decades: 1720s; 1730s; 1740s; 1750s; 1760s
- See also: History of France; Timeline of French history; List of years in France

Events from the year 1742 in France.

== Incumbents ==
- Monarch: Louis XV

== Events ==
- 24 May – War of the Austrian Succession: Battle of Sahay

== Deaths ==
- 20 November – Melchior de Polignac, French diplomat (b. 1661)
