= Thérèse Caval =

18th century French revolutionary

Thérèse Caval (1750–1795), was a French revolutionary. She is regarded as a symbolic heroine of the French revolution in Marseille. With Elisabeth Taneron, she is regarded as the leading figure in the hanging of the anti revolutionary Cayole in 1792. In 1795, she was one of 26 murdered in a massacre performed by royalist forces.
