= 1743 in France =

- Decades: 1720s; 1730s; 1740s; 1750s; 1760s
- See also: History of France; Timeline of French history; List of years in France

Events from the year 1743 in France.

== Incumbents ==
- Monarch: Louis XV

== Events ==
- 10 May – In New France, Governor Jean-Baptiste Le Moyne de Bienville ends his final term (multiple times over 43 years) as Governor of colonial French Louisiana, which he helped colonize; he is succeeded by the Marquis de Vaudreuil (for the next 10 years) and returns to France.
- The Moët & Chandon champagne house is established by Claude Moët in Épernay as Moët et Cie.

== Births ==
- 18 January – Louis Claude de Saint-Martin French philosopher, known as le philosophe inconnu. (d. 1803)
- 24 May – Jean-Paul Marat, French revolutioner, doctor, scientist (d. 1793)
- 17 September – Marquis de Condorcet, French mathematician, philosopher, and political scientist (d. 1794)

=== Unknown date ===
- Catherine Dorothée de Saint-Pierre, French writer

== Deaths ==
- 29 January – Charles-Irénée Castel de Saint-Pierre, French writer (b. 1658)
- 16 June – Louise-Françoise de Bourbon, eldest daughter of Louis XIV and Madame de Montespan; she built the Paris Palais Bourbon where she died (b. 1673)
- 27 December – Hyacinthe Rigaud, French painter (b. 1659)
