= Louis-Étienne Ricard =

French politician (1740–1814)

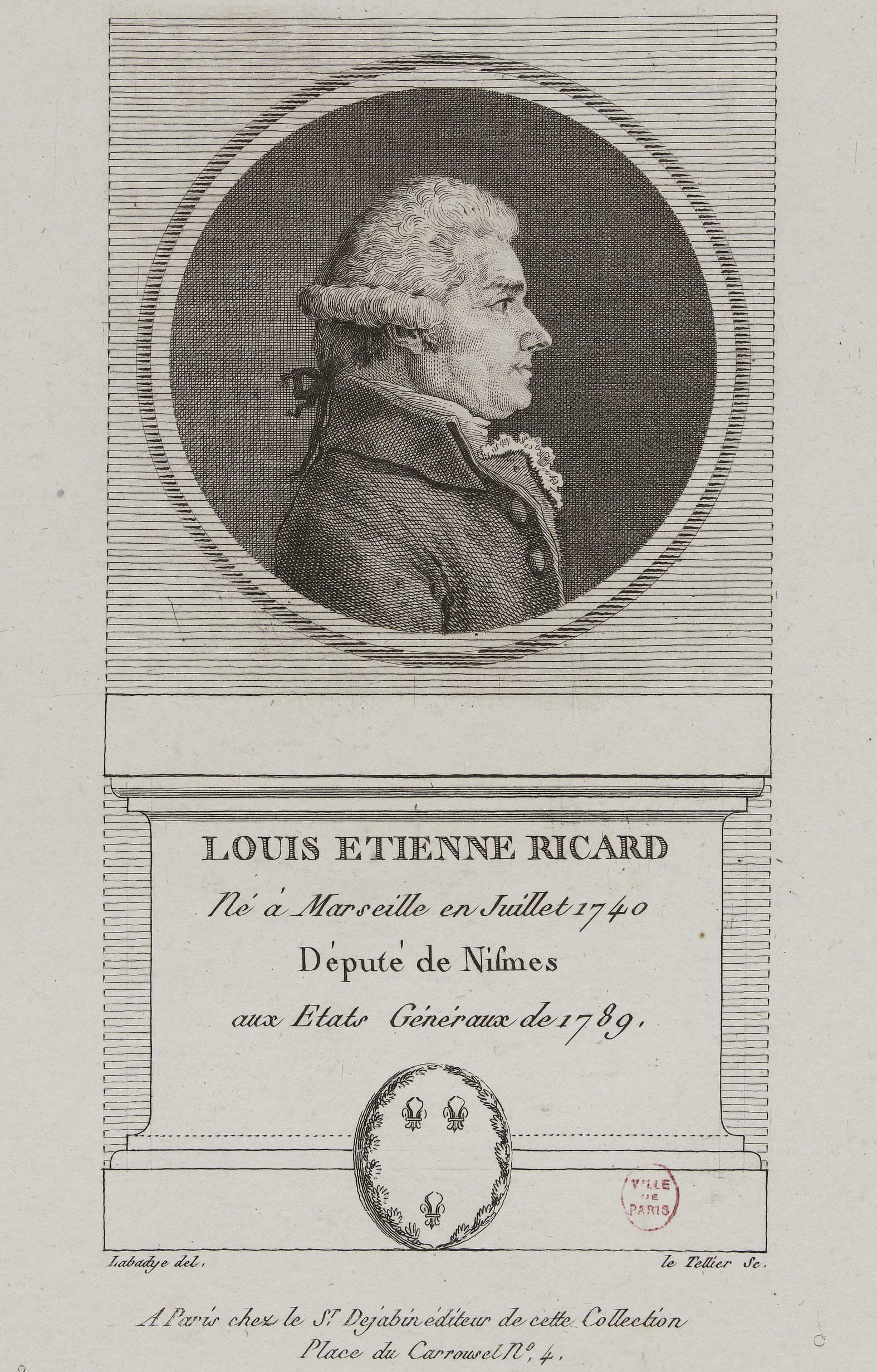
- The French deputy to the Estates-General of 1789, Louis-Etienne Ricard

Member of the National Assembly
- In office 29 March 1789 – 30 September 1791
- Constituency: Gard

Personal details
- Born: October 7, 1740 Marseille, France
- Died: January 6, 1814 (aged 73)
- Spouse: Julie Ginhoux de Saint-Vincent

Louis-Étienne Ricard (July 10, 1740 – January 6, 1814) was a French politician who served as a member of the National Assembly for Gard during the French Revolution.
