= Charles Julien Fanneau de Lahorie =

French sailor

Charles Julien Fanneau de Lahorie (1758–1822) was a French sailor. He was awarded the Knight of the Royal and Military Order of Saint Louis. He died in Cayenne at the age of 63.
