= 1732 in France =

- Decades: 1710s; 1720s; 1730s; 1740s; 1750s
- See also: History of France; Timeline of French history; List of years in France

Events from the year 1732 in France.

== Incumbents ==
- Monarch – Louis XV

== Events ==
- The closing of the Saint-Médard Cemetery.

== Births ==
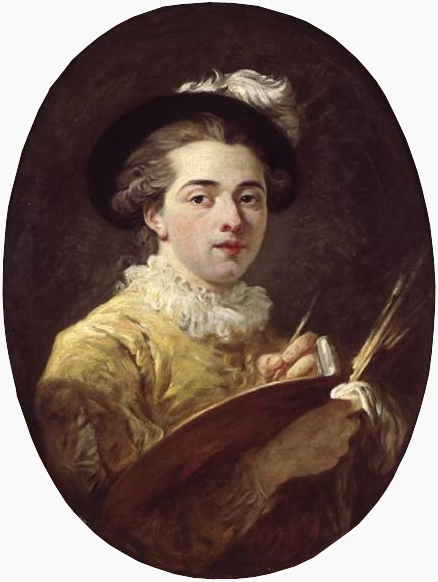
Jean-Honoré Fragonard

- 5 April - Jean-Honoré Fragonard, painter and printmaker (died 1806)
- 13 June - Honoré Fragonard, anatomist (died 1799)
- Pierre Augustin (died 1799)
- 23 March - Princess of France Marie Adélaïde, the fourth daughter of King Louis XV.
- 30 September 1732 - Jacques Necker, was a Swiss banker and became the finance minister of France during the reign of King Louis XVI.
- 9 November - Jeanne Julie Éléonore de Lespinasse, a remarkable French writer.
- 11 July - Jérôme Lalande, a French astronomer.

== Deaths ==
- 29 February - André Charles Boulle, cabinetmaker (born 1642)
- 5 March - Joseph François Salomon, composer (born 1649)
- 18 April - Louis Feuillée, a French explorer geographer and batonist.

=== Full date unknown ===
- Emine Mihrişah Sultan, concubine
- Claude Desgots
