= Jean Baptiste François de La Villéon =

Jean Baptiste François, comte de La Villéon, seigneur du Frescheclos (born 1740) was a French vice admiral. He was member of the Order of Cincinnatus and knight of the ordre de Saint-Louis.

== Career ==
- Garde de la Marine in 1755
- Captain of a navy vessel in 1781
- Contre-amiral in 1792
- Vice-amiral in 1814

== Sources ==
- Christian de Jonquière, "Officiers de Marine aux Cincinnati", Ed. Poliphile 1988.
