= 1754 in France =

- Decades: 1730s; 1740s; 1750s; 1760s; 1770s
- See also: History of France; Timeline of French history; List of years in France

Events from the year 1754 in France.

== Incumbents ==
- Monarch: Louis XV

== Events ==
- 28 May – The Battle of Jumonville Glen begins the French and Indian War in North America: 22-year-old George Washington leads a company of militia from the Colony of Virginia in an ambush on a force of 35 French Canadians.
- 3 July – French and Indian War: Battle of Fort Necessity – George Washington surrenders Fort Necessity to French Capt. Louis Coulon de Villiers.

== Births ==
- 2 February – Charles Maurice de Talleyrand, French politician (d. 1838)
- 15 January Jacques Pierre Brissot, French politician (d. 1795)
- 17 February – Nicolas Baudin, French explorer (d. 1803)
- 17 March – Madame Roland (Jeanne Marie Manon Philipon), French politician (d. 1793)
- 9 August – Pierre Charles L'Enfant, French architect (d. 1825)
- 18 August – François, marquis de Chasseloup-Laubat, French general (d. 1833)
- 23 August – Prince Louis-Auguste, grandson and eventual successor (as Louis XVI) of the reigning King Louis XV (d. 1793)
- 26 September – Joseph Proust, French chemist (d. 1826)
- 9 December – Etienne Ozi, French composer (d. 1813)

== Deaths ==
- 4 July – Philippe Néricault Destouches, French dramatist (b. 1680)
- 27 November – Abraham de Moivre, French mathematician (b. 1667)
