= Philippe-Étienne Lafosse =

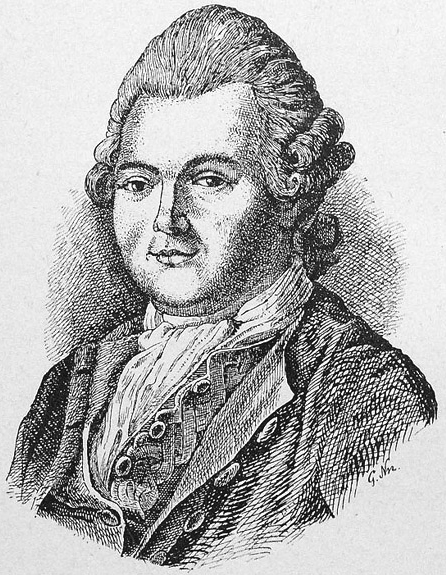
Philippe-Etienne Lafosse

Philippe-Étienne Lafosse (1738 in Paris, France – June 1820 in Villeneuve-sur-Yonne, France), was a French veterinarian and the son of Étienne-Guillaume Lafosse, a farrier.

He is famous for a series of books on horse care, medicine and anatomy which feature elaborate and often highly abstracted illustrations. His works can be found today at the Ecole Nationale Vétérinaire d'Alfort, France's oldest and most prestigious veterinary school and hospital on the outskirts of Paris. At the time of the school's founding 1766 and Lafosse's work, horses played an important role in French economic, and military success and as such many scientists devoted careers to the study of equine science.

== Publications ==
father of veterinary anatomy

- Mémoire sur la morsure de la musaraigne (1763) (Memoire on the bite of the shrew) (It was still believed at this time that the bite of the shrew was venomous like the spider's. In fact, in French, the scientific name for shrew, musaraneus, is formed from the Latin root for mouse "mus" and for spider "araneau").
- Guide du Maréchal (1766) (Guide for shoeing horses).
- Cours d'hippiatrique, ou traité complet de la médicine des chevaux (1772) (Veterinary studies, or complete treatise on equine medicine).
- Dictionnaire raisonné d'hippiatrique, cavalerie, manège et maréchallerie (1775) (Dictionary of Veterinary studies, cavalry, horse tack and horse-shoeing).
