= 1752 in France =

- Decades: 1730s; 1740s; 1750s; 1760s; 1770s
- See also: History of France; Timeline of French history; List of years in France

Events from the year 1752 in France.

== Incumbents ==
- Monarch – Louis XV

== Births ==
- 10 May – Pierre de Ruel, marquis de Beurnonville, military officer (died 1824).
- 20 August – Peter Ochs, French-born Swiss politician (died 1821)
- 21 August – Jacques Roux, priest (died 1794)

=== Full date unknown ===
- Pierre Joseph Bonnaterre, naturalist (died 1804).

== Deaths ==
- 9 March – Claude Joseph Geoffroy, apothecary and chemist, 66
- 17 March – Jacques-Pierre de Taffanel de la Jonquière, Marquis de la Jonquière, admiral and governor, 66
- 14 June – Charles-Antoine Coypel, painter, 57
- 19 September – Louis Fuzelier, playwright, 80?
