= Madeleine Leroy =

Madeleine Leroy (1685–1749) was a French industrialist. She was the owner and manager of one of the biggest faience-factories in France in Marseille between 1710 and 1749.

== Life and career ==
Madeleine Leroy was one of seven children of Anne Heraud (d. 1710) who was one of the pioneers of the faience manufacture in Marseille and who had expanded the business, considerably after the death of her spouse in 1706.

Leroy was the heir of her mother and took over the business upon her mothers death in 1710. As such she managed one of the major businesses of the region. She manufactured and exported faiance to Italy, Egypt and the Middle East, as well as the American colonies.

She was the mentor of one of her employees, Claude Perrin (d. 1748), was himself to become the founder of a major faiance company, which was developed by his widow Pierrette Perrin.
