= 1734 in France =

- Decades: 1710s; 1720s; 1730s; 1740s; 1750s
- See also: History of France; Timeline of French history; List of years in France

Events from the year 1734 in France.

== Incumbents ==
- Monarch – Louis XV

== Events ==
- 29 June – Battle of San Pietro
- 19 September – Battle of Guastalla

== Births ==
- 18 February – Jean-Marie Roland de la Platière, manufacturer and revolutionary (died 1793)
- 9 March – Marie-Suzanne Giroust, painter (died 1772)
- April – Nicolas Champenois, missionary (died 1811)

=== Full date unknown ===
- Gilles-Barnabé Guimard, architect (died 1805)

== Deaths ==
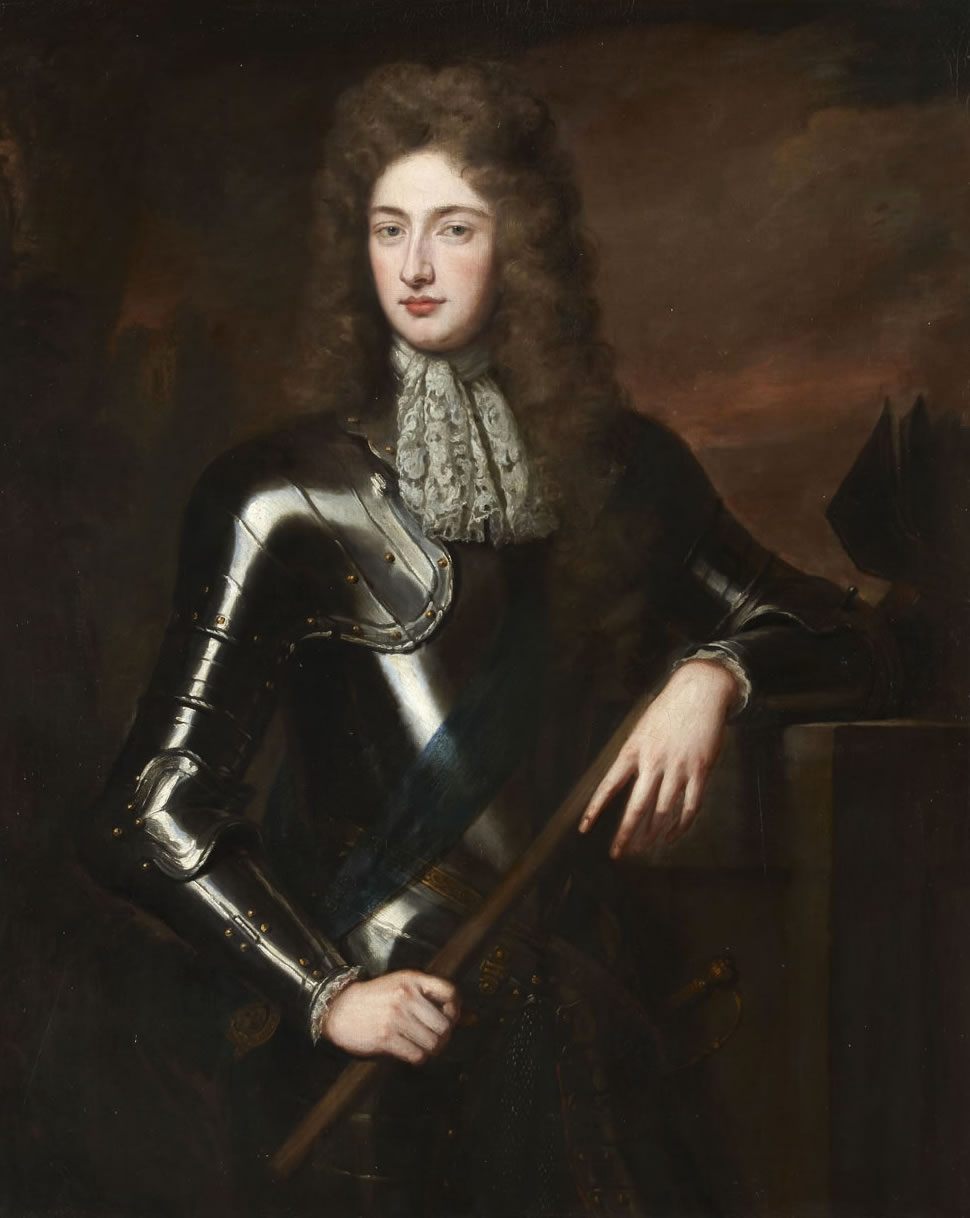
James FitzJames, 1st Duke of Berwick

- 9 February – Pierre Polinière, investigator of electricity and electrical phenomena (born 1671)
- 10 February – Jean Raoux, painter (born 1677)
- 1 April – Louis Lully, composer (born 1664)
- 21 May – Philippine Élisabeth d'Orléans, princess (born 1714)
- 27 May – Claude Audran III, painter (born 1658)
- 12 June – James FitzJames, 1st Duke of Berwick, military leader (born 1670)
- 5 September – Nicolas Bernier, composer (born 1664)
- 14 November – Louise de Kérouaille, Duchess of Portsmouth, mistress of Charles II of England (born 1649)
- 21 November – Alexis Simon Belle, painter (born 1674)

=== Full date unknown ===
- Louis de Chastillon, painter (born c.1639)
- Étienne de Veniard, Sieur de Bourgmont, explorer (born 1679)
