= 1872 in France =

- Decades: 1850s; 1860s; 1870s; 1880s; 1890s
- See also: History of France; Timeline of French history; List of years in France

Events from the year 1872 in France.

== Incumbents ==
- President: Adolphe Thiers
- President of the Council of Ministers: Jules Armand Dufaure

== Events ==
- 22 May - Georges Bizet's comic opera Djamileh is premièred at the Opéra-Comique in Paris.
- 13 November (07:35) (probable date) - Claude Monet begins painting Impression, Sunrise (Impression, soleil levant, the painting that will give a name to Impressionism) as viewed from his hotel room at Le Havre.
- 27 November - Meteor shower display over France.
- Louis Ducos du Hauron creates an early color photograph.
- Chargeurs established as a shipping company.
- S. T. Dupont begins manufacture of luxury leather goods.

== Art ==
- Gustave Courbet - Nature morte aux fruits
- Edgar Degas - Le Foyer de la danse à l'Opéra de la rue Le Peletier
- Gustave Doré - Le Christ quittant le prétoire
- Henri Fantin-Latour - Un coin de table
- Jean-Léon Gérôme - Pollice Verso
- Édouard Manet
  - Berthe Morisot au bouquet de violettes
  - Portrait de Clemenceau
- Claude Monet
  - Impression, soleil levant
  - Régates à Argenteuil
  - La Seine à Rouen
  - Printemps
- Berthe Morisot - Le Berceau
- Pierre-Auguste Renoir
  - Parisiennes habillées en Algériennes
  - Le Pont-Neuf
- Alfred Sisley
  - Le Pont de Villeneuve-la-Garenne
  - Le Canal Saint-Martin
  - Pêcheurs étendant leurs filets
  - Le Bac de l'île de la Loge, inondation
  - La Grand-Rue à Argenteuil
  - Rue de la Chaussée in Argenteuil
  - The Seine at Argenteuil
  - Villeneuve-la-Garenne
- Alfred Stevens - La parisienne japonaise
- James Tissot
  - An Interesting Story
  - Le Thé

== Literature ==
- Alphonse Daudet - Tartarin de Tarascon
- Jules Verne
  - Aventures de trois Russes et de trois Anglais dans l'Afrique australe
  - Le Tour du monde en quatre-vingts jours
- Émile Zola - La Curée

== Music ==
- Georges Bizet - L'Arlésienne
- Charles Gounod - Marche funèbre d'une marionnette
- Jules Massenet - Don César de Bazan
- Jacques Offenbach
  - Le roi Carotte
  - Fantasio
- Camille Saint-Saëns
  - Gavotte, Op. 23
  - Romance, Op. 37

== Births ==
- 16 January - Henri Büsser, composer and conductor (died 1973)
- 18 January - Prince Emmanuel, Duke of Vendôme, noble from the House of Orléans (died 1931)
- 24 February - Gustave Sandras, artistic gymnast (died 1951)
- 26 March - Émile Armand, individualist anarchist (died 1962)
- 7 June - Rodolphe d'Erlanger, painter and musicologist (died 1932)
- 1 July - Louis Blériot, inventor, engineer and aviation pioneer (died 1936)
- 2 July - Gaëtan Gatian de Clérambault, psychiatrist (died 1934)
- 15 July - Jean Dargassies, racing cyclist (died 1965)
- 28 July - Albert Sarraut, politician, twice Prime Minister of France (died 1962)
- 22 September - Octave Denis Victor Guillonnet, painter (died 1967)
- 17 October – Madeleine Rolland, translator and peace activist (died 1960)
- 30 November - Maurice de la Taille, priest and writer (died 1933)
- 12 December - Daniel Halévy, historian (died 1962)

=== Full date unknown ===
- Léon Bouly, inventor of the cinématographe (died 1932)
- François-Victor Équilbecq, author (died 1917)
- Colette Reynaud, feminist, socialist and pacifist journalist (died 1965)

== Deaths ==
=== January to June ===
- 6 February - Auguste Joseph Alphonse Gratry, author and theologian (born 1805)
- 31 March - Jules Guyot, physician and agronomist (born 1807)
- 5 April - Paul Auguste Ernest Laugier, astronomer (born 1812)
- 28 April - Louis Désiré Blanquart-Evrard, photographer (born 1802)
- 20 June - Elie Frédéric Forey, Marshal of France (born 1804)
- 27 June - Michel Carré, librettist (born 1821)

=== July to December ===
- 5 July - Charles-Pierre Denonvilliers, surgeon (born 1808)
- 4 October - Jean-Jacques Bourassé, priest, archaeologist and historian (born 1813)
- 21 October - Jacques Babinet, physicist, mathematician and astronomer (born 1794)
- 23 October - Théophile Gautier, poet, novelist, journalist, dramatist and literary critic (born 1811)
- 29 October - Pierre Charles Fournier de Saint-Amant, chess master (born 1800)
- 6 December - Félix Archimède Pouchet, naturalist (born 1800)
- 10 December - Étienne Arnal, actor (born 1794)
- December - Jean-Baptiste Honoré Raymond Capefigue, historian and biographer (born 1801)

=== Full date unknown ===
- Ximénès Doudan, journalist (born 1800)
