= Portrait of Clemenceau =

Portrait of Clemenceau may refer to:

- Portrait of Clemenceau (Manet, Paris)
- Portrait of Clemenceau (Manet, Fort Worth)
