= Ximénès Doudan =

French journalist (1800–1872)

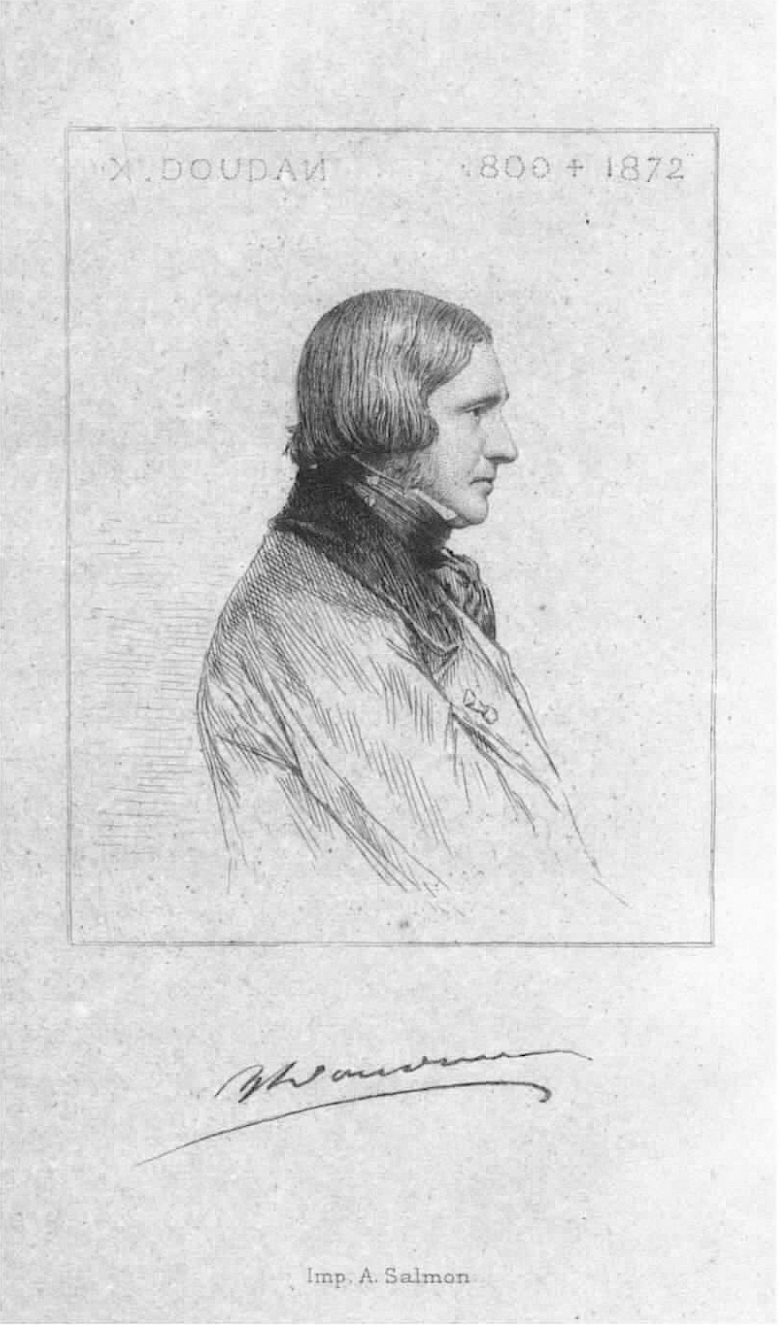
image of Ximénès Doudan

Ximénès Doudan, born in Douai in 1800, died in Paris on August 20, 1872, was a French journalist, critic and moralist.

== Biography ==
During his youth in Paris, and after a stay in Cambrai, he became tutor at the college Henri-IV, lived rue des Sept-Voies, and had as comrades Saint-Marc Girardin and Silvestre de Sacy. He wrote in La Revue française and in the Journal des Débats. In the mid-1820s, Girardin recommended him to Abel François Villemain, who in turn introduced him to Victor de Broglie.

Having become a close friend of Albertine de Staël-Holstein, daughter of Germaine de Staël who had married Victor de Broglie, he was appointed tutor to Louis-Alphonse (1812–1842), son of Albert de Rocca and Germaine de Staël, a child who was orphaned in 1818.

Doudan became the head of the cabinet of the various ministries of the Duc de Broglie between 1830 and 1836, then remained his private secretary, before being appointed master of requests at the Conseil d'Etat.

Very big reader, admirer of Sainte-Beuve, he published literary criticism in newspapers and corresponded with a circle of friends, including Eugénie de Guérin and Theobald Piscatory. His preserved correspondence runs from 1823 to 1872.

No book by Doudan was published during his lifetime. After his death, it was mainly Alfred-Auguste Cuvillier-Fleury who edited his Mélanges et Lettres (1876–1877), Lettres (1879), Pensées and fragments, followed by the Revolutions of taste (1881). In October 1876, Cuvillier-Fleury gave a lecture at the Institut de France and brought out of oblivion "the amiable Doudan", whom he presented as "an unknown author, a free-thinker in the world", and whom the literary press soon described as an "unpublished moralist". Doudan was read by Friedrich Nietzsche, Jean-Marie Guyau, and Marcel Proust, among others.

Pasteur gave a certain notoriety, quoting it in his Speech of acceptance to the French Academy, to a passage from Doudan which begins with the sentence: "I have thought for a long time that someone with only clear ideas would certainly be a fool".

According to Antoine Compagnon, Doudan fell after 1910 into relative oblivion.

== Works ==
- Mélanges et lettres, avec une introduction de Joseph d'Haussonville et des notices signées Silvestre de Sacy et Alfred-Auguste Cuvillier-Fleury (1876–1877).
- Lettres (1879) — tomes I à IV, sur Gallica (BNF)
- Pensées et fragments suivis des révolutions du goût (1881)
- Des révolutions du goût, suivi de deux articles non-recueillis précédemment. Introduction par Henri Moncel. Paris, 1924.

== Bibliography ==
- Mary Fischer, A group of French critics: Edmond Schérer, Ernest Bersot, Saint-Marc Girardin, Ximénès Doudan, Gustave Planche, Chicago, A.C. McClurg and company, 1897, p. 198–227 — on archive.org.
- Claire Witmeur, Ximénès Doudan. Sa vie et son œuvre, Paris, E. Droz, Bibliothèque de la faculté de philosophie et lettres de l'université de Liège -LX-, 1934.
- Ernest Seillière, Un familier des doctrinaires, Ximénès Doudan, Recueil Sirey, 1943.
- Gabrielle Clopet, Ximénès Doudan, épistolier au XIXe siècle, 1953.
