= Frederick Harford =

Frederick Harford may refer to:

- Frederick Kill Harford (1832–1906), English clergyman, musician, and hymn writer
- Frederick Henry Harford (1841–1926), British colonel
