= Epic of Samba Gueladio =

18th-century Fula epic poem

Folk tale
- Name: Epic of Samba Gueladio
- Aarne–Thompson grouping: ATU 300 (Dragonslayer)
- Mythology: Fula
- Country: Senegal and Mauritania
- Region: Futa Tooro
- Origin Date: Late 18th century
- Published in: First written version by Anne Raffenel (1856)

The Epic of Samba Gueladio is a Fula legend based on the power struggle of Samba Gueladio Djegui, an 18th-century king of the Denianke dynasty of Futa Tooro (modern-day Senegal and Mauritania). The story is about Samba's exile and his heroic actions such as slaying a monster before his return to the throne. Widely known across the Fula region, it is considered the national epic of Senegal and is listed as UNESCO Intangible Cultural Heritage for Mauritania.

The epic's hero, Samba, is the son of a king who dies before his birth, leading Samba's uncle, Konko Bou Moussa, to take power. Samba goes into exile and is granted power from a djinn. He goes to the kingdom of the Moors, where he kills a water monster and performs a cattle raid under orders of the Moorish king. He is granted an army to return home, where he reclaims the throne before being killed by his female cousin. The hero is portrayed as courageous, determined, and morally ambiguous, and his intense violence reflects the ethos of the ceddo warrior class.

There are at least fourteen distinct written versions of the Epic of Samba Gueladio. The first was by Anne Raffenel in 1856, written in a European literary style, which influenced adaptations by writers including Laurent Jean Baptiste Bérenger-Féraud. François-Victor Équilbecq, an early scholar of African epics, wrote a study about the versions of the epic as well as his own version, published in 1913. The epic saw a wave of attention beginning in the 1970s, with historian Oumar Kane composing a reconstructed version. Written versions began to be directly based on performances, transcribed by writers including Amadou Ly and Issagha Correra.

== Background ==
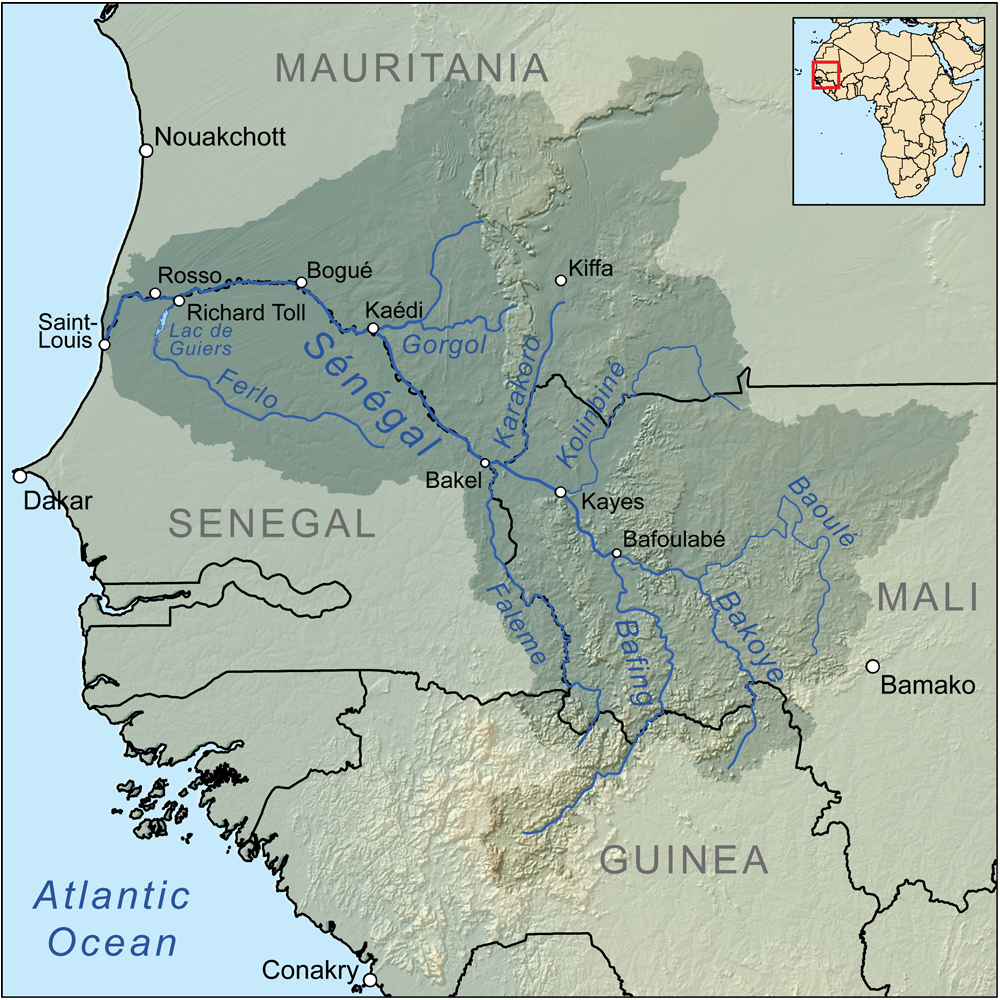
The Futa Tooro region is centered on the Senegal River.

The legend of Samba Gueladio, sometimes described as an epic, is from the Fula peoples, particularly the Haalpulaar and Toucouleur of Senegal and Mauritania, respectively. It is part of the oral tradition of Futa Tooro, a Fula-speaking region centered on the Senegal River. However, the precise geographic origin of the story is unknown. The legend is conveyed through the spoken word along with music during performances by griots or community gatherings such as birthdays and weddings. It is classified as a hoddu, a Fula performance genre named for the instrument that accompanies it.

The epic identifies its hero, Samba Gueladio Djegui, as a leader of the Denianke dynasty of Futa Tooro. This dynasty ruled from around the 16th century, succeeding the kingdom of Takrur. Records from the early 18th century indicate that the region experienced a civil war as well as trade with France, both having parallels with events in the epic. The dynasty was conquered by an Islamic imamate, circa 1776. As the Denianke dynasty was the predecessor of an Islamic state, it became symbolic of the pre-Islamic era, and griots developed stories such as Samba Gueladio to praise the Denianke era, particularly its warrior class of ceddo. The Islamic era was the start of written history in Futa Tooro, weakening the importance of the oral tradition. The imamate ruled until French colonization in 1861, and independence in 1960 divided the region between the republics of Senegal and Mauritania, where the Fula are minorities.

Samba Gueladio's reign has been placed in multiple timespans. Early-20th-century scholars noted similar names that appear on various versions of the Denianke king list: Henri Gaden identifies him with Samba Lamu (r. circa 1640), (Note: Gaden's source was an unpublished manuscript, likely by the Fula writer Sirê Abbas Sôh.) while François-Victor Équilbecq identifies him with Sambaboe (r. 1690s). Scholars from the 1960s onward have placed the story's setting in the 18th century, based on king lists and commercial records. The accepted chronology states that Samba Gueladio ruled initially from 1725 to 1730, and again from 1738 until his death around 1741, both times being succeeded by Konko Abou Moussa. The historical Samba Gueladio fought to regain his throne but might not have maintained power. This chronology places him as one of the last leaders of the Denianke dynasty.

Virtually all historians have agreed that Samba Gueladio existed. However, the epic is only loosely based on a historical era, and it may be mostly legendary. According to literary scholar Stephen Belcher, the story may have evolved over time to include elements from later parts of history.

== Summary ==
The hero of the epic is Samba Gueladio Djegui, the heir to the throne of the Denianke dynasty, depicted as a Muslim. (Note: There is no evidence that the historical Samba Gueladio was Muslim.) His uncle, Konko Bou Moussa, has claimed the throne, and the story is about Samba's exile and attempt to become king. Samba is portrayed as cunning, courageous, independent, and morally ambiguous. Either Samba or the antagonist may have braided hair in some versions. The story is often violent, with Samba fighting monsters, domestic animals, and humans, including his own relatives. Samba represents the ceddo warriors, with his violence reflecting the ceddo ethos. Other characters that generally appear include Samba's horse, Oumoulatouma.

The story begins with Samba's birth after the death of his father, Gueladio Djegui, by which time Konko has usurped the throne. In some versions, he orders to kill the infant Samba, who is saved by being disguised as either a girl or a servant.

Early scenes contain similar elements across many versions, conveying Samba's courage and determination, as well as his competition with a cousin. Once he is an adolescent, Samba demands inheritance from his uncle. In some versions, Samba receives only a horse, depicting him as foolish; in others, he receives several false gifts, including sleep, but he responds by being so loud that the entire village cannot sleep until he receives what he is owed. Other sources of conflict include an encounter with a European trader, as well as attempts to kill Samba during events such as a circumcision ceremony. Samba goes into exile after fighting one of Konko's sons. In some versions, upon his exile, an unspoken message between Samba and his uncle is communicated using a gift.

In exile, Samba brings his horse and his griot. The defining events of the story are mostly consistent across versions, beginning with Samba's encounter with a djinn, during which he receives his musical theme. The djinn grants Samba magical protection and weapons, with which he then kills the djinn. He and his griot continue to the kingdom of the Moors. In some versions, Samba and his griot had been travelling with their mothers before departing for the Moorish kingdom, entrusting a nearby ruler, the Tunka of Tiyabu, to take care of them; later, when the two return from exile, they punish the Tunka for poor treatment of their mothers.

The most important event is Samba's slaying of a water monster, establishing his heroism. The monster controls the Moorish city's water supply, and Samba arrives the day before the scheduled sacrifice for it to grant access. Samba takes his horse to water, but the monster attacks, so Samba kills it. Samba is recognized for this action by the Moorish king. (Note: The story says little about the kingdom of the Moors, and historians have not identified it with particular places. Many versions give the king's name as El-Kebrir, possibly from the Arabic El-Kebir ('The Great').)

The Moorish king begins sending Samba on missions, fighting monsters and kings. In many versions, Samba and the Moorish king do not trust each other. Some of the missions are meant to kill Samba. An event included in most versions of the story is a cattle raid under orders of the Moorish king; he raids the cattle of a rebel king, Birama Ngourori, leaving a few behind as a courtesy. The Moors grant Samba a strong army to return home.

The day Samba returns to his village, he either joins a dance (Note: Samba is able to dance despite being surrounded by enemies due to the ceddos' protections of hospitality.) or encounters Konko. The next day, Samba wins the battle of Bilbassi before fighting Konko. He takes the throne and kills his male cousins. He is ultimately betrayed and killed by a female cousin, who is also his wife; (Note: Depending on the version, the female cousin who kills Samba is named either Diyé Konko or Rella.) she gives him a poison, which he knowingly accepts to avoid dishonor. After Samba dies, his head kills a man.

== Written versions and scholarship ==
Works including versions of the Epic of Samba Gueladio
- via Internet Archive
- Nouveau Voyage au Pays des Nègres by Anne Raffenel (1856, French)
- Recueil de Contes Populaires de la Sénégambie by Laurent Jean Baptiste Bérenger-Féraud (1885, French)
- Essai sur la Littérature Merveilleuse des Noirs by François-Victor Équilbecq (1913, French)
- Anthologie Nègre by Blaise Cendrars (1927, reprint of Équilbecq)
- Atlantis by Leo Frobenius (1921, German)
- The Epic of Samba Gueladio Diegui by Amadou Ly (1997, English)

Since 1856, at least fourteen versions of the Epic of Samba Gueladio have been published, excluding reprints and adaptations. (Note: This figure counts Raffenel's publication and those derived from it as a single version.) At least nine were recorded during the colonial era. European scholars analyzed the work as they became interested in the concept of the African epic. François-Victor Équilbecq, one of the first commentators on African epics, wrote a study of the Epic of Samba Gueladio, written in 1913–1914 and published posthumously, which described several written versions. (Note: Équilbecq's study, titled "La Légende de Samba Guélâdio Diêgui, Prince du Foûta" ("Legend of Samba Gueladio Djegui, Prince of Futa"), was first published in 1974 by his colleague Robert Cornevin.)

=== Raffenel and derived versions ===
The first thorough description of the epic was in French by Anne Raffenel as a supplement to his 1856 travel report, the Nouveau Voyage au Pays des Nègres. His version, the "Ballade de Samba Galadieghi", was not credited to a storyteller and was likely an original version, not a transcription. It describes Samba's exile, his slaying of the monster Niabardidalo, and his cattle raid against Birama Ngourori, for which el-Kebrir grants him troops to return home. Many paragraphs begin with the refrain "Il est parti" ("He has left"). The use of a refrain is not found in performances of West African epics; according to Belcher, it may instead be influenced by the gumbala musical tradition or may be an adaptation of the use of praise names.

Raffenel's work followed the European literary style and the tastes of his era, contributing to its influence and appropriation. Though Raffenel did not use the word epic, he compared Samba Gueladio to the epic hero Ulysses. According to Belcher, Raffenel's publication was possibly the first version of a West African epic in written literature.

The 1885 work Recueil de Contes Populaires de la Sénégambie by Laurent Jean Baptiste Bérenger-Féraud included a version titled "Ballade de Samba Foul". As noted in Équilbecq's study, Bérenger-Féraud's version was a shortened version of Raffenel's. Although the texts are different, the plot and the refrain are the same. Bérenger-Féraud's version became popular.

Bérenger-Féraud's version was reprinted in the second issue of the magazine Présence Africaine in 1947. The issue compiled works of traditional literature from Sub-Saharan Africa; its versions of both this epic and the Ballade de Dioudi were directly taken from Bérenger Féraud. Both of these became falsely attributed to Senegalese poet Léopold Sédar Senghor and appeared in his collected works, Poémes (1964), (Note: The first edition of Senghor's Poémes (1964) included the epic. It was excluded from the second edition in 1973 but again appeared in the 1991 edition.) stating that they were published in Présence Africaine. According to Belcher, Senghor may have been the editor who selected these texts for the magazine, where they appeared without Bérenger-Féraud's name, leading to the mistaken attribution.

Other versions of the epic resemble Raffenel's. A 1907 publication by Henri Lanrezac included some phrases taken from either Raffenel or Bérenger-Féraud; Équilbecq considered it similar to, but distinct from, Raffenel's version. Lanrezac described the story as an epic, which he considered more prestigious than other forms of oral tradition. An anthology of African epics published by the Ministry of Education of Cameroon in the 1970s included the epic, which it stated was "collected in Senegal by M. Lagrave", but it was an abridgement of Raffenel's version.

=== Équilbecq ===
Équilbecq's posthumously published study included a version of the epic he received from Faama Mademba Sy, ruler of Sansanding, as well as a reprint of Raffenel's version. It also summarized versions recorded by Gaden and Franz de Zeltner (Note: De Zeltner's version dates to circa 1910.) as well as a manuscript received by colonial administrator Capitaine Steff.

Équilbecq published a new version of the epic in his 1913 collection of West African folktales. His study included his initial transcript of the story, as told by his informant Boubacar Mahmadou in non-standard French and transcribed using stenography. Équilbecq's final version was a play, influenced by the German Romantic genre of Märchendrama. He used the term geste or chanson de geste, which referred to heroic tales in Medieval European literature, and he associated the story with the "chivalrous mentality" of this genre. His European framing distanced the story from the Black population of Senegal. (Note: Équilbecq believed the Denianke dynasty to be of Semitic origin, and therefore not fully Black, reflected in his description of the Epic of Samba Gueladio as a "half-Black Iliad".) Équilbecq's version was reprinted in Blaise Cendrar's 1927 compilation of African folklore, Anthologie Nègre.

=== Other versions ===
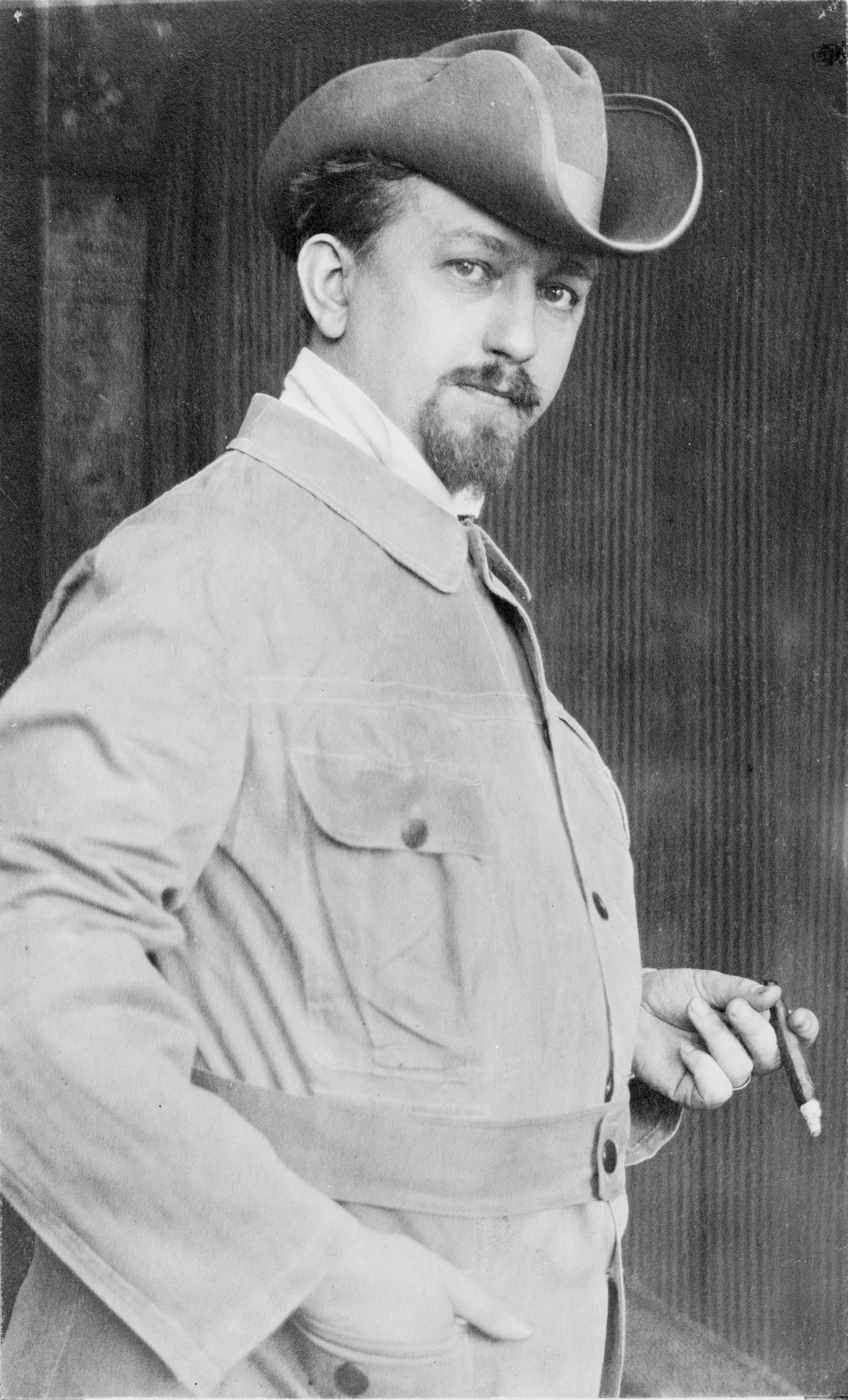
Leo Frobenius published a German-language version.

Other publications of the epic include a version collected by Leo Frobenius in his 1921 German-language compilation of West African folklore, Atlantis. Senegalese educator Abdoulaye Sadji wrote the work Ce que Dit la Musique Africaine, which compiled versions of folktales performed by the griot Bakary Diebaté. This text includes two stories, "Amadou Macina" and "Samba, ou Kongo-Moussa Galadieghi", which combine the Epic of Samba Gueladio with other narratives. (Note: Sadji's character of Amadou Macina appears to be based on Seku Amadu, founder of the Massina Empire of the early 19th century, but he is depicted as the son and killer of Samba.)

From the 1970s to the 1990s, the epic saw a surge of popularity, largely based around Dakar. Historian Oumar Kane published a reconstructed version of the historical story and an essay on its chronology, both in 1970. Direct transcriptions of oral performances of the story became available around this time. A written version by Amadou Ly was a French translation of a performance by the griot Pahel Mamadou Baïla. (Note: Ly's version depicts Samba as being from a Mandé bloodline, descended from Sundiata Keita, reflecting the genealogy by Sirê Abbas Sôh.) Other versions based on performances have been written by Abel Sy, Samba Ndaw Sar, and Issagha Correra. According to Belcher, the story had "belonged more to folklore and literature than to history" until this era, when historians increasingly focused on the oral tradition.

== Analysis ==
=== Motifs ===
The Epic of Samba Gueladio combines many common motifs of oral literature, with few elements unique to it. According to Belcher, it was created by combining various influences into a story of a local hero, only vaguely resembling the historical figure. Within the Fula tradition, the Epic of Samba Gueladio is a fergo, a story about migration.

The narrative follows a common structure of exile and return. Scholar Samba Ndaw Sar compared this structure to the Epic of Sundiata, about the exile of Mandé emperor Sundiata. This epic differs from the Epic of Samba Gueladio as it concerns the founding of a kingdom, not a war within an existing kingdom, and Sundiata usually acts with magical power, not violence. A motif shared by both involves the use of a gift to send an unspoken message upon the hero's exile; Ly's version explicitly makes this comparison with Sundiata. Both heroes' mothers also play similar roles, being placed in the care of a Tunka.

Samba's fight with a water monster is another example of a common motif, the dragonslayer (Aarne-Thompson classification 300). As observed by Frobenius, this motif is used in stories from many West African cultures. The Soninke people, neighbors of Futa Tooro, use the dragonslayer motif in the tale of the fall of Wagadu, though the dragon in this tale is protective, unlike the one fought by Samba. The legend of Hama the Red, from the Fula of Massina, has a very similar story to that of Samba Gueladio, as both exiled heroes slay a water monster by the order of a ruler before receiving an army to return home. Belcher argues that the same story was applied to both heroes, who play similar roles in their cultures as pre-Islamic leaders. The oral literature of Massina has other parallels with the Epic of Samba Gueladio, including many details of the cattle raiding scene and the presence of braided hair.

=== Themes ===
Death and killing feature prominently in the narrative. According to an analysis of Correra's version by literary scholar Blandine Koletou Manouere, death is conveyed through Samba's hyperbole, as he exaggerates his allies' might, and through his communications with characters such as Konko. This version features a monologue from Konko Bou Moussa after Samba's birth, which repeats words including 'kill', 'death', and 'annihilate'. Furthermore, Samba being killed by his cousin involves a theme of violating social norms, reflecting a gender dynamic in which a wife's betrayal threatens a man's honor. This betrayal is made explicit by Correra:

C'est ainsi qu'il n'est mort
ni par une balle ni par une autre chose,
mais par traîtris

And thus he was killed,
not by a bullet nor by any other thing,
but by treachery

— Issagha Correra, Samba Guéladio, épopée peule du Fuuta Tooro

Senegalese historian Boubacar Barry considers the Epic of Samba Gueladio representative of African epics in its glorification of violence, including slave raiding. He notes that the hero is characterized as courageous, risk-taking, and following the noble ideal that death is preferable to dishonor. He places it in the historical context of violence by the ceddo warlords, as well as by aristocrats who fueled the slave trade. He wrote, "sadly, these days the epic of Samba Gelaajo Jeegi is recalled with no awareness of its real historical context. That context was dominated by the violent slave trade, which was the real reason behind the emergence of this type of warlord, steeped in the ceddo ethos." According to Belcher, the epic's depiction of the ceddo ethos may serve to contrast the instability of the era against later Islamic values.

Samba is characterized by a determination to achieve his mission, a feature in common with other epic heroes such as Sundiata. Like other Fula heroes, Samba is also prone to exaggeration; in Correra's version, he states, "No creature can measure up to me." Samba's independence and his actions against Konko reflect a theme of defiance, a defining feature of the fergo genre, while his courage, honor, and independence reflect the Fula virtues of pulaaku.

== In modern culture ==
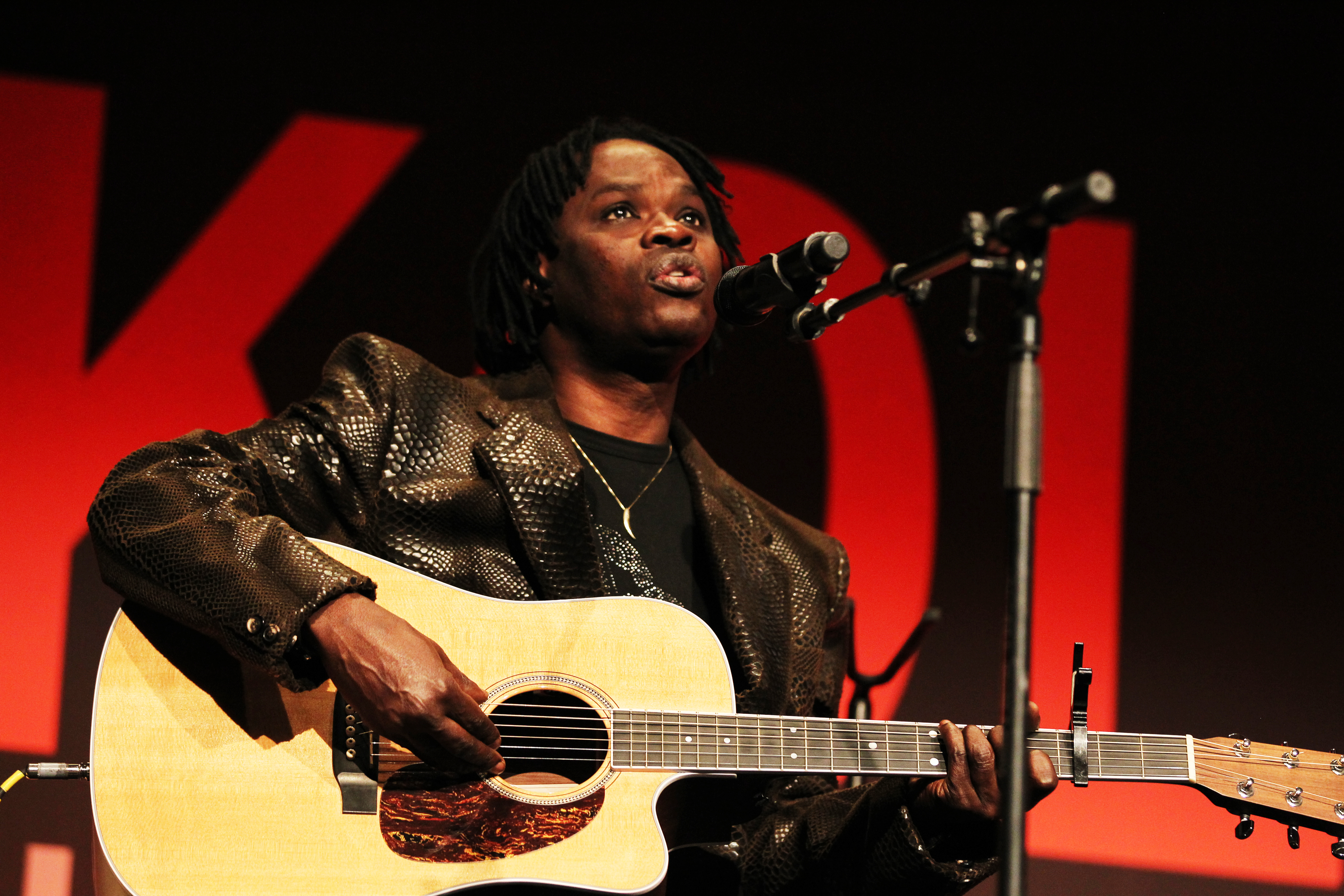
Baaba Maal recorded a song about Samba Gueladio.

The Epic of Samba Gueladio is one of the most famous African epics. It is widely known among the Fula people, both along the Senegal River and as far as Niger and Mali. The publications by Cendrars and Senghor introduced the story to readers beyond West Africa, though it is not as widely recognized as other epics of West Africa, such as that of Sundiata. It is considered a national epic of Senegal.

People in Futa Tooro view the Epic of Samba Gueladio as a way to teach the region's history and historical values, as well as a tribute to inter-ethnic alliances. Belcher attributes the epic's sustained popularity to its representation of an era in which the Fula had their own unified country, as well as the understanding of the story as an national epic of the Fula to parallel the Mandé Epic of Sundiata or those of Europe.

Popular music about Samba Gueladio includes a song by Senegalese musician Baaba Maal, which describes the character but not the plot. It includes the refrain "Samba dogaata" ("Samba will not flee"), possibly influenced by Raffenel's refrain. The name Gueladio was also used in the book Jujubier by Aminata Sow Fall, though this character has little to do with Samba Gueladio.

UNESCO listed the Epic of Samba Gueladio as Intangible Cultural Heritage for Mauritania in 2024. Initiatives supporting the listing were led by the country's president, Mohamed Ould Ghazouani, as well as Correra, who was backed by the Institut Fondamental d'Afrique Noire.
