= Regatta at Molesey near Hampton Court =

Painting by Alfred Sisley

The Regatta at Molesey
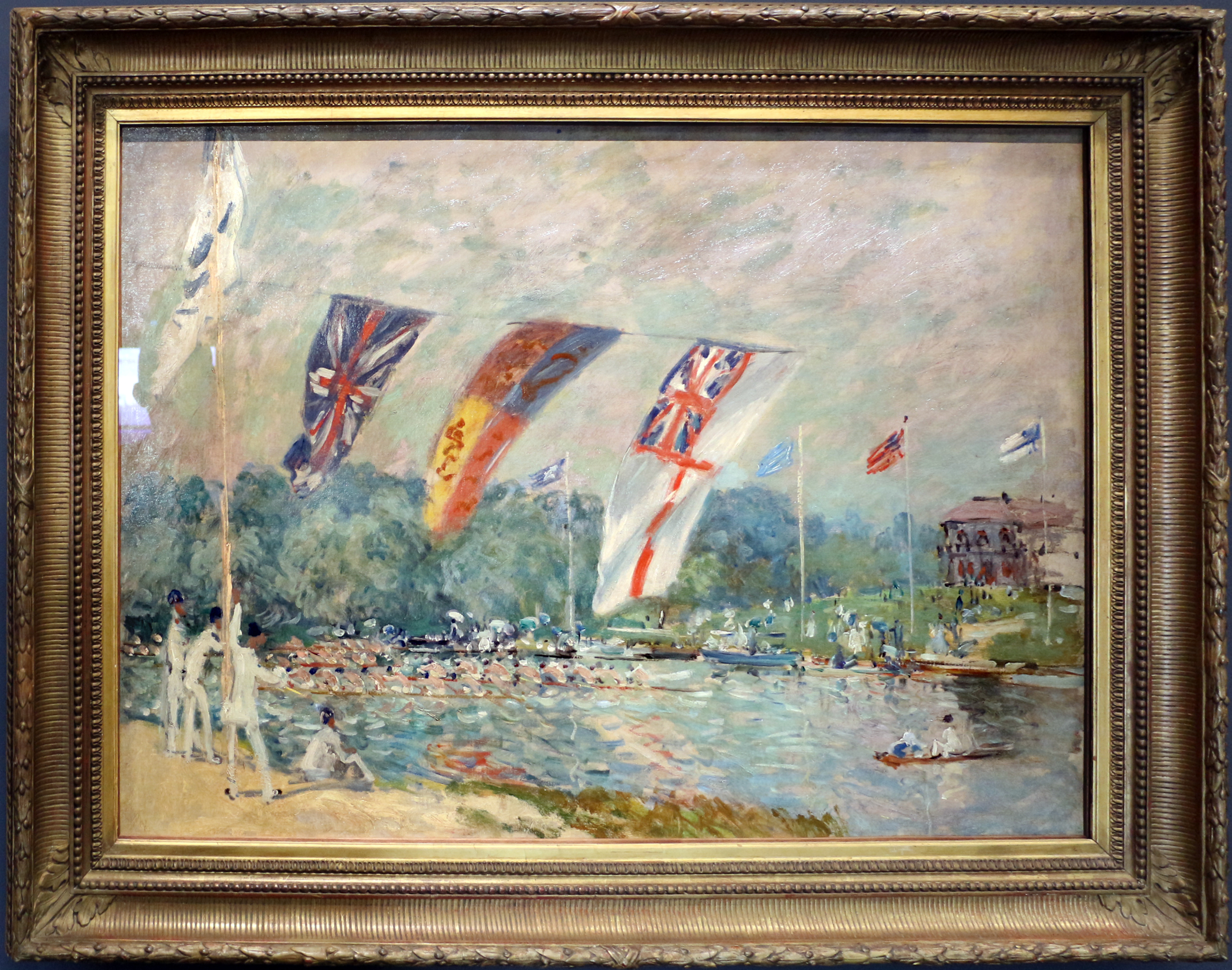
- Artist: Alfred Sisley
- Year: 1874
- Medium: Oil on canvas
- Dimensions: 66 cm × 91.5 cm (26 in × 36.0 in)
- Location: Musée d'Orsay, Paris

Regatta at Molesey near Hampton Court is an 1874 painting by Alfred Sisley, now in the Musée d'Orsay, to which it was allocated in 1986. The work shows the Molesey Regatta on the River Thames, begun by an amateur sportsman in 1873 and still in existence. The viewpoint looks upstream from Molesey Boat Club, with the recently constructed Island Hotel visible on Tagg's Island.

It was left to the French state by the painter and collector Gustave Caillebotte in 1894, and previously hung in the Musée du Luxembourg (1896–1929), the main building at the Louvre (1929–1947), and the Louvre's galerie du Jeu de Paume (1947–1986).

Sisley produced the painting during a four-month stay in England in the summer of 1874, funded and accompanied by his patron the art collector Jean-Baptiste Faure. Sisley settled at Hampton Court and produced a series of canvases of views of the non-tidal Thames. Paradoxically, in usually cloudier England, Sisley's paintings became brighter and more festive.

== Gallery ==
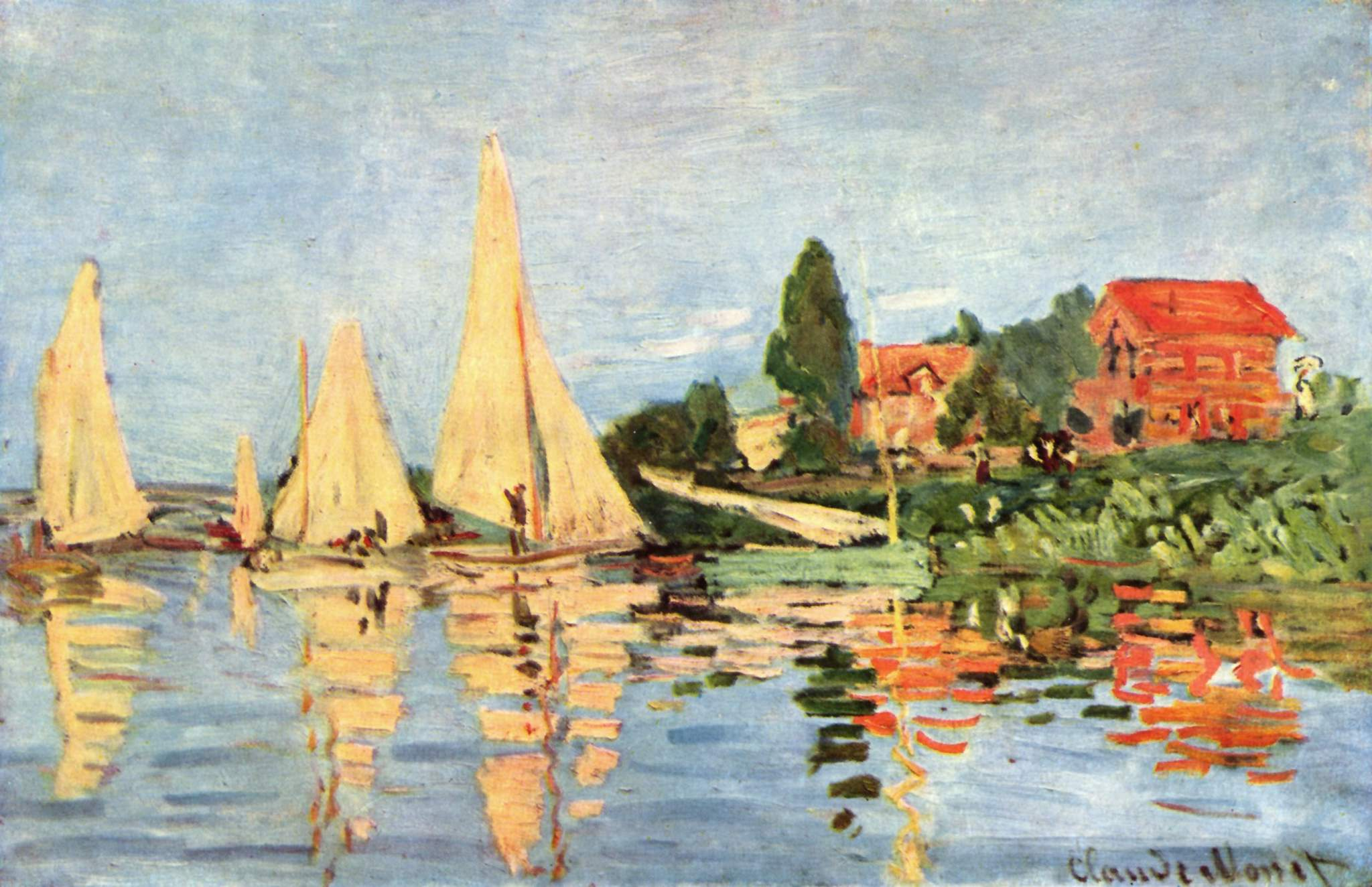
Claude Monet, Regatta at Argenteuil, 1872, Musée d'Orsay (Paris)

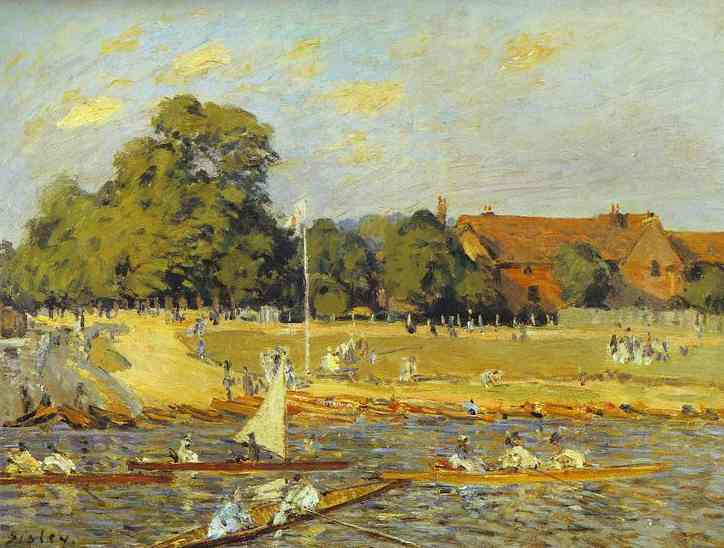
Alfred Sisley, Regatta at Hampton Court, 1874, Fondation et Collection Emil G. Bührle

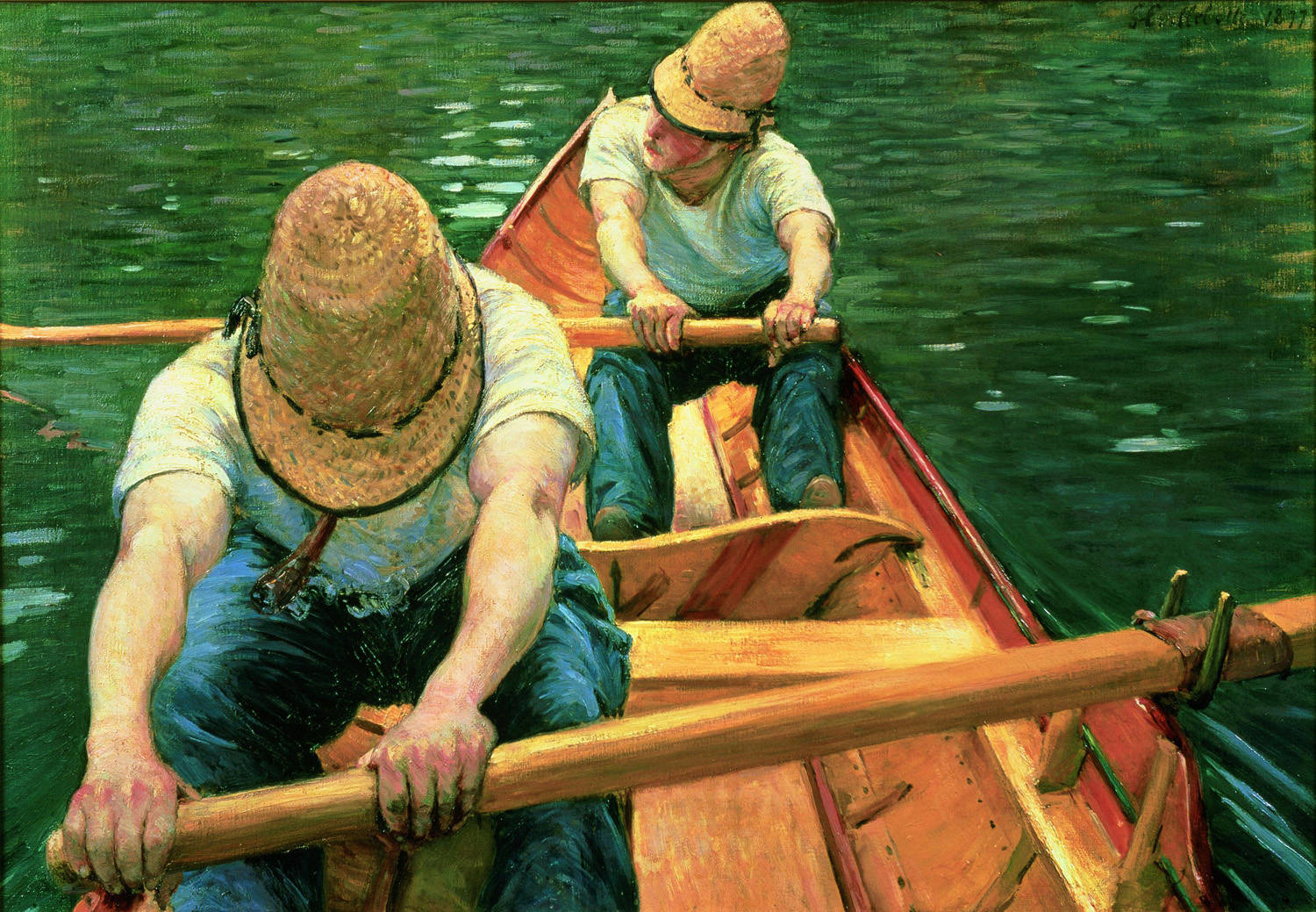
Gustave Caillebotte, Rowers, 1877

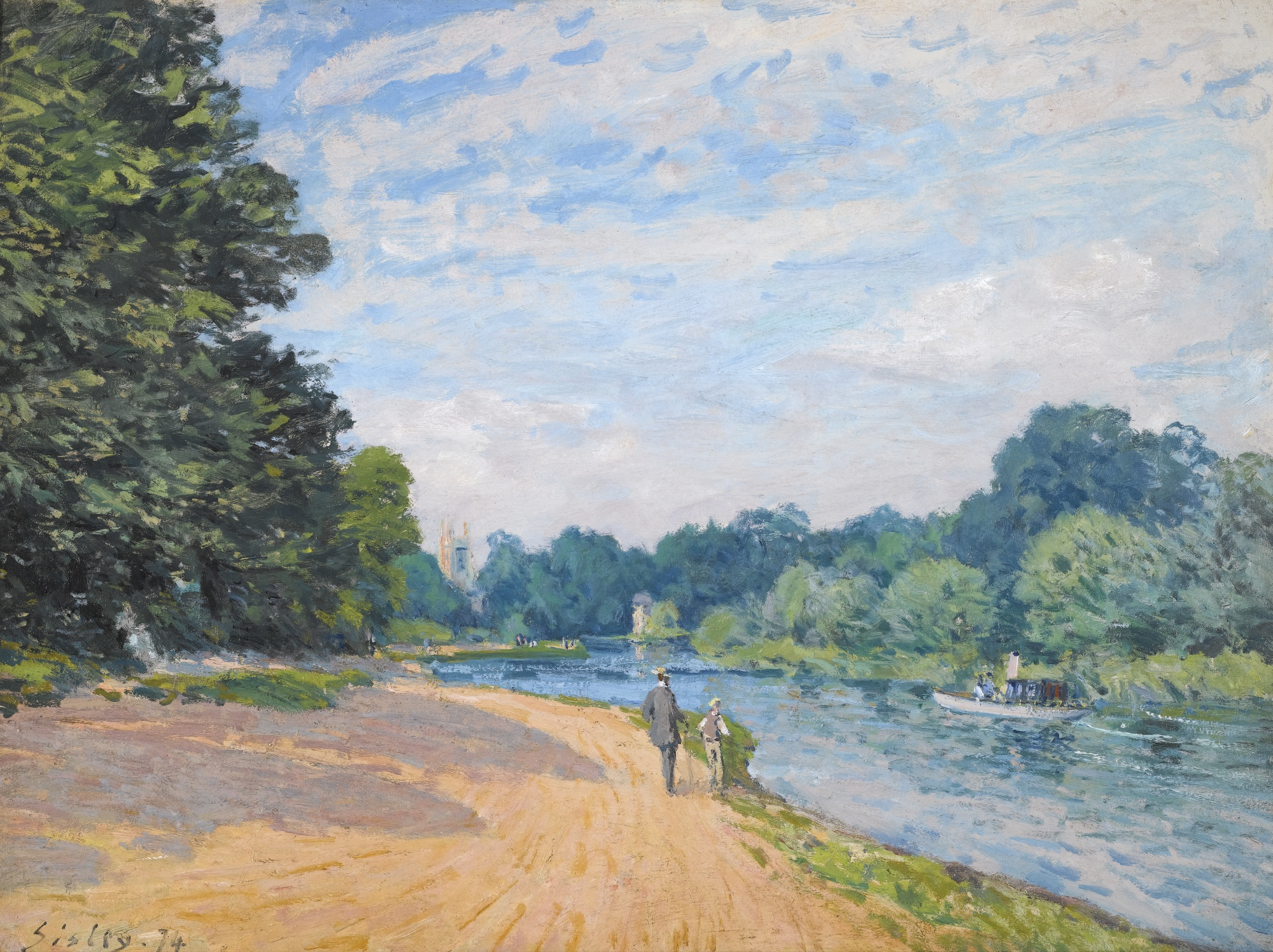
Alfred Sisley, The Thames with Hampton Church, 1874

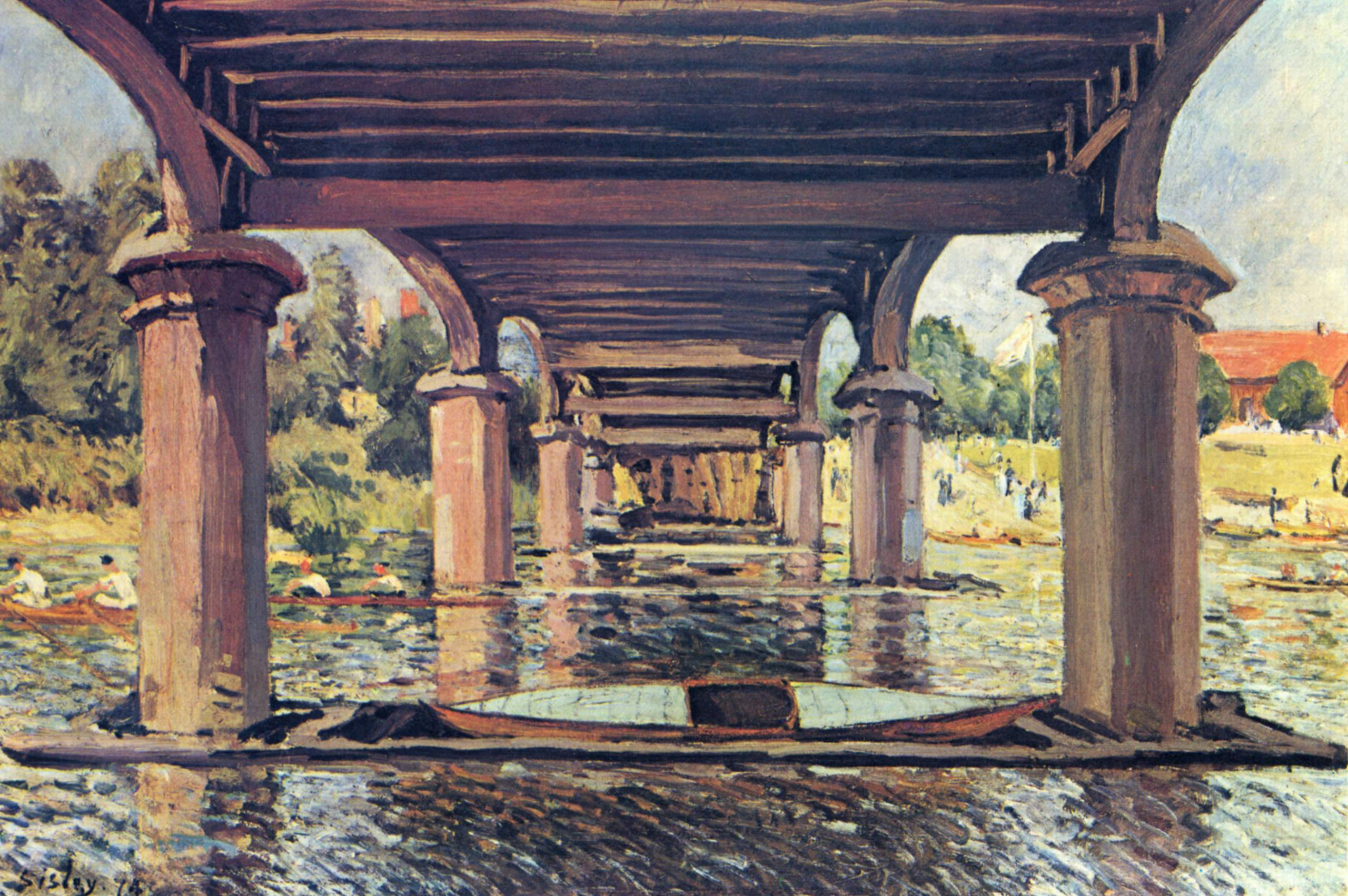
Alfred Sisley, Under Hampton Court Bridge, 1874, Kunstmuseum Winterthur (Switzerland)

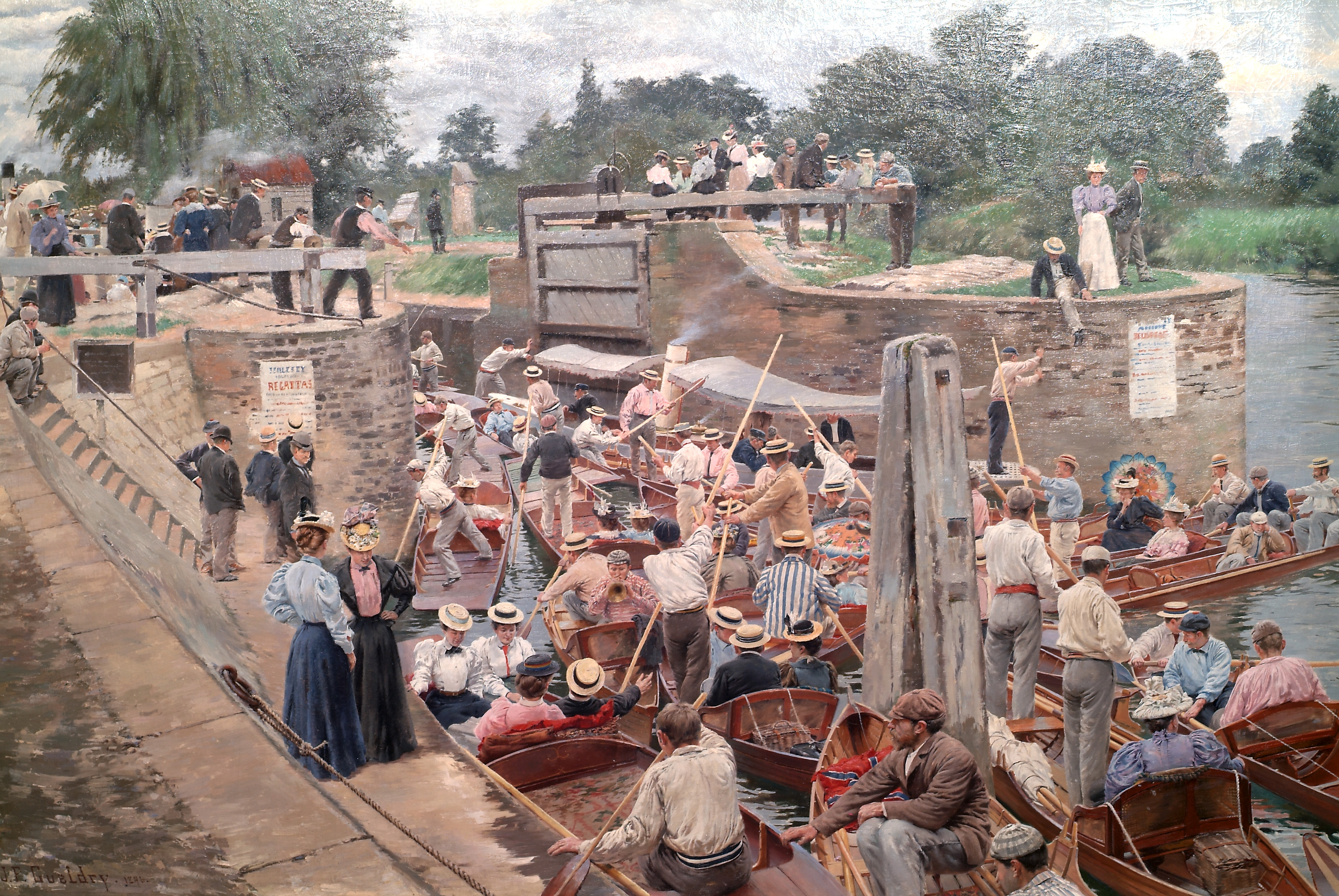
Ferdinand Gueldry, Molesey lock, 1896, Musée d eNogent-sur-Marne (France)

== See also ==
- List of paintings by Alfred Sisley
