= Christ Leaving the Praetorium =

Painting by Gustave Doré

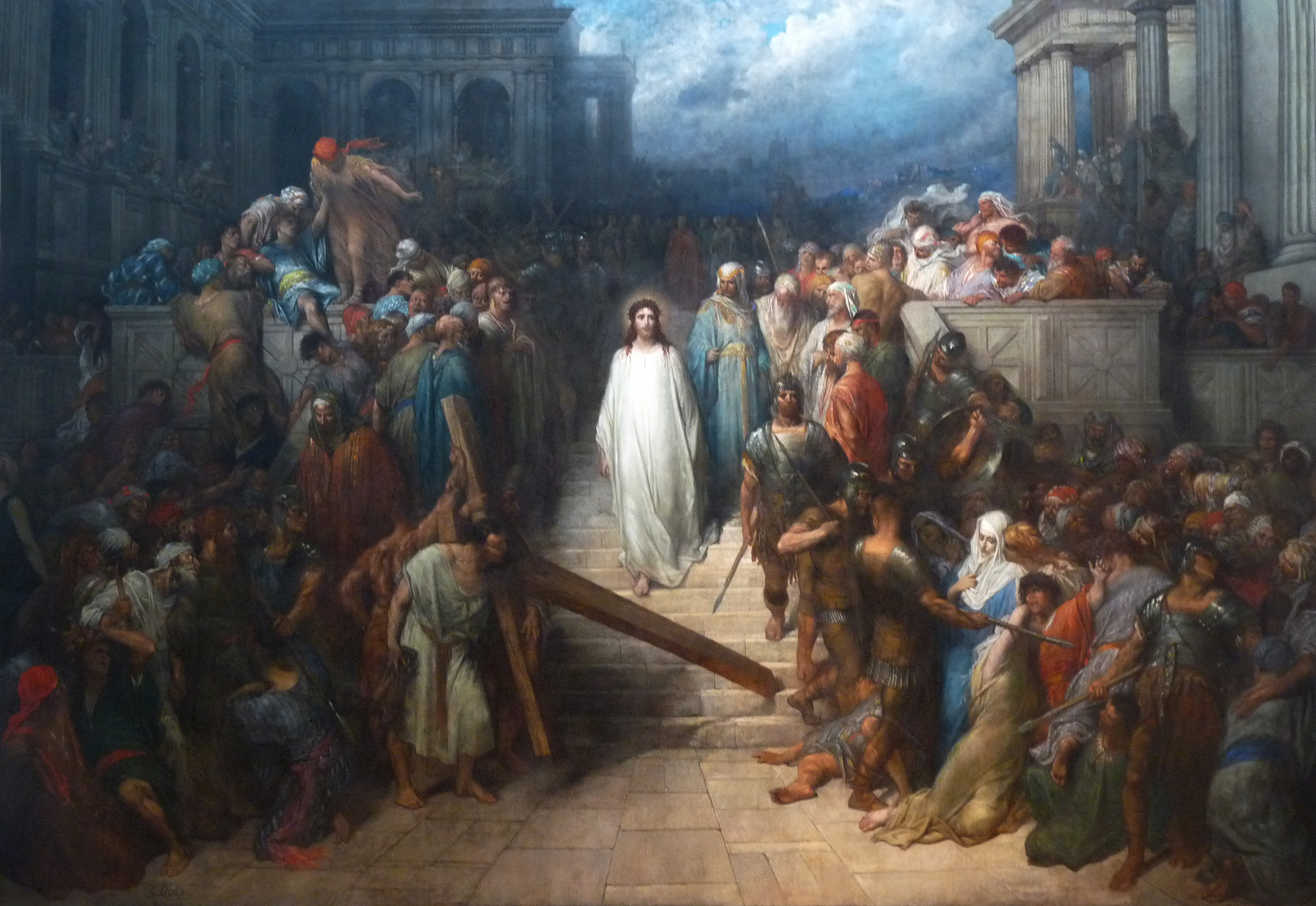
- Artist: Gustave Doré
- Year: 1872
- Medium: Oil on canvas
- Dimensions: 609 cm × 914 cm (240 in × 360 in)
- Location: Strasbourg Museum of Modern and Contemporary Art, Strasbourg

Christ Leaving the Praetorium is an oil-on-canvas painting by the French artist Gustave Doré, created between 1867 and 1872. It was the largest of his religious paintings, with the dimensions of 609 by 914 cm, and is considered to be "the work of his life". The painting was a great success, and it was reproduced in engraving in 1877. Doré himself created other replicas, of which two are known to be extant: one, significantly smaller, is in the Bob Jones University Picture Gallery in Greenville, in South Carolina; the other, almost as large as the original, is kept in the Musée d'Arts de Nantes.

The original was acquired in 1988 by the Strasbourg Museum of Modern and Contemporary Art, at the painter's birthplace. It required a long restoration, carried out in public from 1998 to 2003, in the museum's large Gustave Doré Room, where it is exposed.

== The original painting and its replicas ==
The original painting, the most monumental of Doré's paintings, was created in the largest of his Parisian studios, a former gymnasium of 400 m2, located at 3 Rue Bayard, and rented since 1865. After its completion in April 1872, it was first exhibited at the Doré Gallery, in London, starting in May.

In 1873, the owners of his London gallery, James Fairless and George Lord Beeforth, commissioned him a replica. Not having obtained satisfaction, they reiterated their request two years later. Doré created a replica, of large but slightly smaller dimensions (482 by 722 cm), painted between 1876 and 1883. It is owned by the Nantes Museum of Fine Arts, which bought it in the United States, in 1984.

Doré informed Fairless and Beeforth, on February 24, 1882, by letter, that six replicas were in the making. Of this, a third extant version, kept at Bob Jones University in Greenville, is significantly smaller than the previous two (148 by 223 cm).

== History ==
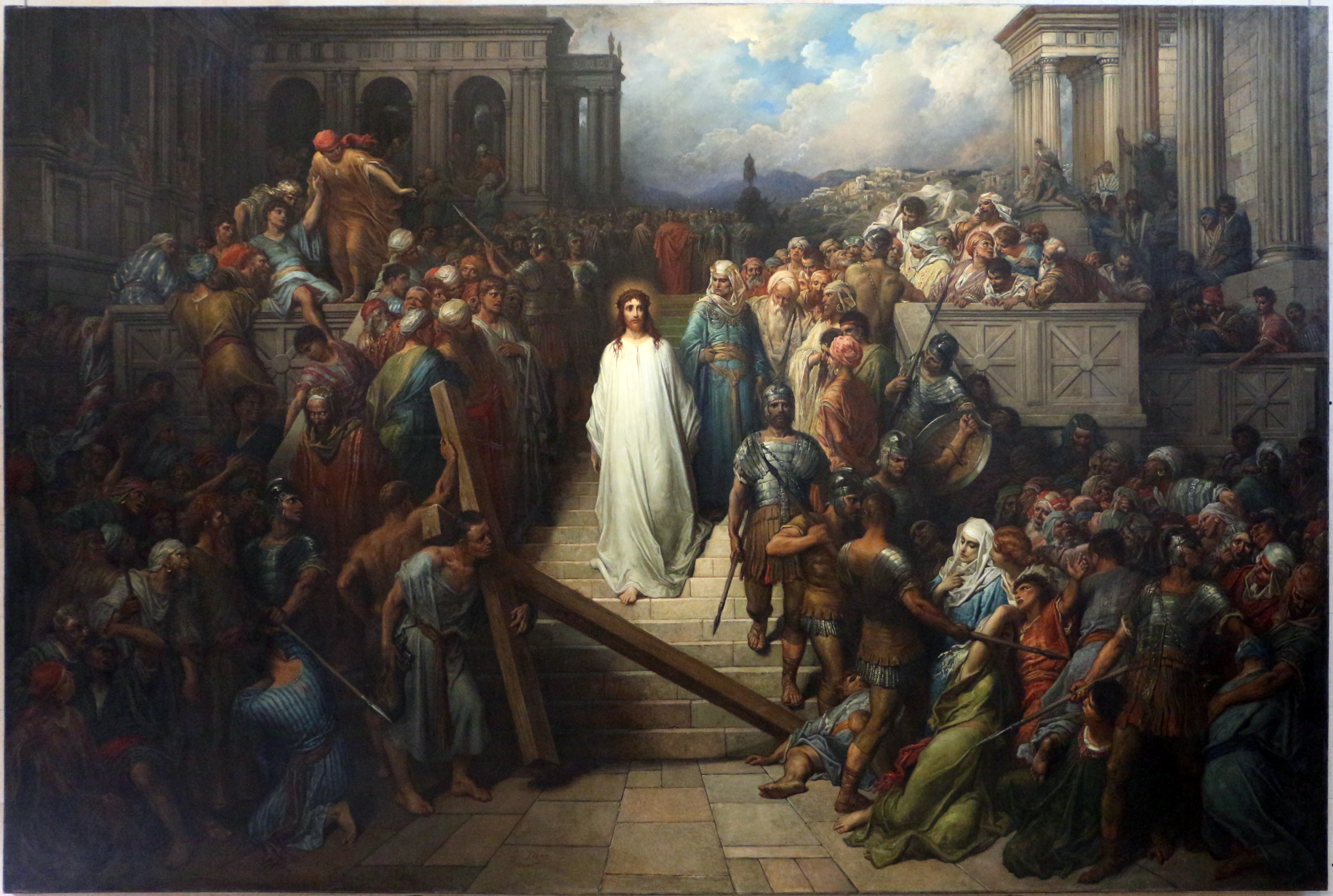
Replica in the Museum of Nantes (1876–1883)

Doré was disappointed to be seen mostly as an illustrator by the French critics, who often disregarded his painting. However, his paintings were appreciated abroad, particularly in England, where he successfully exhibited in 1867. The following year, he accepted the proposal of two London publishers, the art dealers James Fairless and George Lord Beeforth, to open a gallery at 35 New Bond Street in London, entirely dedicated to the permanent display of his paintings: the Doré Gallery.

The illustrations of his monumental Bible, published on December 1, 1865, to take advantage of Christmas sales, in all the capitals of Europe, gave him a reputation as religious painter. He created several more or less spectacular religious paintings that were intended for the Doré Gallery, which included this monumental Christ Leaving the Praetorium. He started working on it in 1867, and it would take him five years to complete it. The work was frequently interrupted by the making of several illustration works, and mostly by the siege of Paris at the French-Prussian War, and then the insurrection of the Paris Commune, during which he rolled up and buried his canvas. He only resumed his work on the painting in the beginning of 1872 and finished it in April.

The painting was finally sent to London in May 1872. After Doré's death, in 1883, the painting was part of a long traveling exhibition of the Doré Gallery in the United States, starting in 1892. It began in Carnegie Hall, in New York City, and finished triumphantly in Chicago, in 1896. When the painting returned to London in 1898, after the death of the owners of the Doré Gallery, it was stored and forgotten.

Rediscovered in the 1960s, it was acquired by Oscar Kline, owner of the Central Picture Gallery in New York, before entering the collection of George Encil in 1984, who placed it on deposit in Vienna in the Votivkirche. In 1988, it was bought by the Museum of Modern and Contemporary Art, in Strasbourg, thanks to the Regional Fund for the Acquisition of Museums, and finally returned to France. Since its restoration, this masterpiece by Gustave Doré is exhibited in a room to its measure, vast and very high, with some of his other paintings.

The episode depicted in this work is original: it took place between two episodes of the Passion of Christ, often represented in religious iconography, the Presentation of Jesus to the crowd by Pontius Pilate, who let them choose between Him and Barrabas, and the Carrying of the Cross. According to one of his first biographers, his friend William Blanchard Jerrold, the fact that this particular episode had never been represented previously in painting was evoked during a meal at George Grove in Sydenham in the company of the Rev. Frederick Harford, canon of Westminster Abbey, in 1867.

Doré immediately was set to work, and made numerous studies in black and white for the groups of figures and the head of Christ. He sometimes felt irritated at having to postpone it to work on his illustrations. When he traveled in London in the company of Blanchard Jerrold to prepare the illustrations for London: A Pilgrimage, the latter found him obsessed with his large painting, to the point of integrating certain London perspectives into it. This is how the view of the neoclassical St George's Church, in Hanover Square, with the statue of William Pitt the Younger, in the southern part of it, on a particularly gloomy morning, inspired him to create the colonnades of the temple on the right and the statue in the background at the center of the painting.

Originally, the painting was "bathed in light" according to Blanchard Jerrold. But Frederick Harford, during a visit to Doré in 1870, when the painting was practically finished, felt disappointed: for him, " the sky should have been overcast; this dreadful morning should not have been sunny", and the painter, understanding his criticism, begun to darken the top of the canvas, gradually bringing out "the awesome majesty of the Savior in the sadness of this sad morning". Shelved during the siege of Paris, the painting was not resumed and completed until after the end of the 1870 war. It was presented in Paris in April 1872, before leaving for London in May.

== Description ==
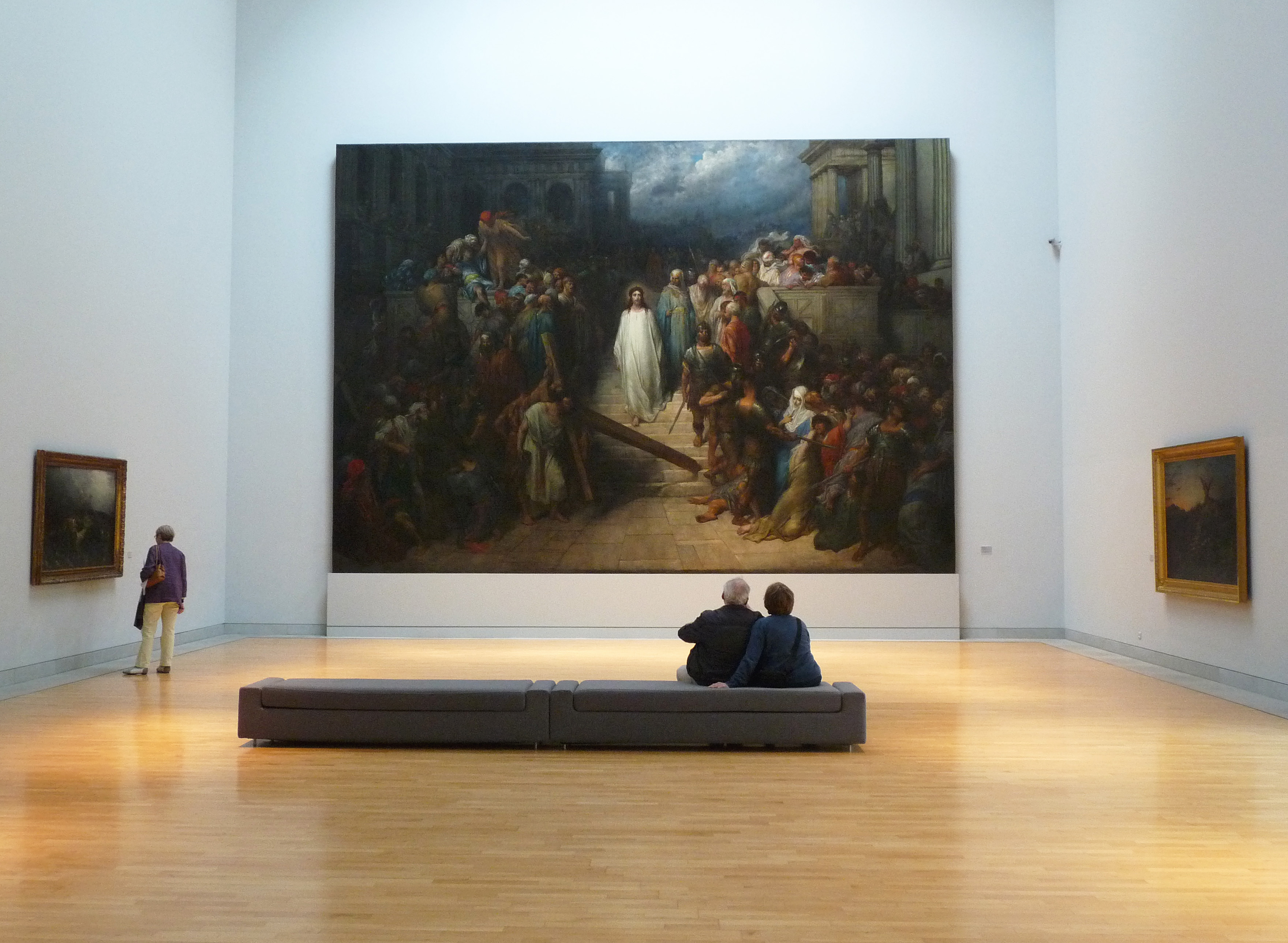
The painting in the room of the museum where it's located

Pilate, wearing a purple toga, is standing at the top of the steps, completely drowned in shadows in the background, like Herod Antipas. Caiaphas, and two other people, on the right on the steps, slightly behind Jesus, rejoice at his condemnation. Judas Iscariot, in the crowd, on the left, turns away, with his eyes lowered, while most of the figures are facing Jesus. To the right, at the bottom of the steps, standing in the middle of the crowd, pushed back by the soldiers, stands the Virgin Mary, recognizable by her blue and white clothes, in accordance with tradition, she is surrounded by the holy women and John the Apostle, on whose shoulder Mary Magdalene faints.

Because of the large dimensions of the canvas, the painter did not really unify the perspective, to avoid deformations; but it is nevertheless rigorous: the vanishing point of the paving is located towards the foot of Jesus, while the lines of the architectures in the background converge on the statue of Caesar drowned in the mist. This symbolic construction recalls the question of the two powers (temporal and spiritual) at the heart of the trial of Jesus.

Christ is placed exactly in the center of the composition, and of the guiding lines which structure the painting: the vertical axis of symmetry, the horizontal line of the balustrade, and the transverse lines, which all intersect at the level of his head. Jesus is depicted in white, with his head bloodied by the crown of thorns and a soft light around him. He is the only one who looks in the direction of the spectators. A variety of action is also shown in the surrounding characters, such as soldier pushing the crowd, and gesticulating spectators.

The composition of the painting is very classic, even academic, with its large architectures reminiscent of works like The School of Athens, by Raphael, or The Wedding at Cana, by Veronese. While falling within the contemporary imagery of Jesus, of the time, this "grand spectacle" painting, intended to impress a wide audience, seems to evoke future Hollywood blockbusters.

== Reception ==
This painting, considered by the painter as the "work of his life", is quite exemplary of his work: the composition is ample, the staging theatrical and dramatic. Admittedly, it is not free from faults: thus, Blanchard Jerrold notes "the relative proportions of the characters, the unfinished drawing, in short, various weaknesses of a technical nature", such as this fault in the perspective of the cross on the foreground (even more marked in the replica of Nantes). But to see only them would be to "reduce the artist to the rank of simple craftsman", while, in front of this painting, the viewer is emotionally carried away by the painter's force of conviction, his power to create space, to make present the multitude and the "majesty of the Savior, who directs himself, detached, in a calm serene, towards Golgotha ". Moreover, Nadine Lehni, chief curator at the Rodin Museum, analyzing the replica kept in Nantes in 1987, said that she was struck by "the gigantism of its composition and the vitality that emanates from it".
