= Molesey Regatta =

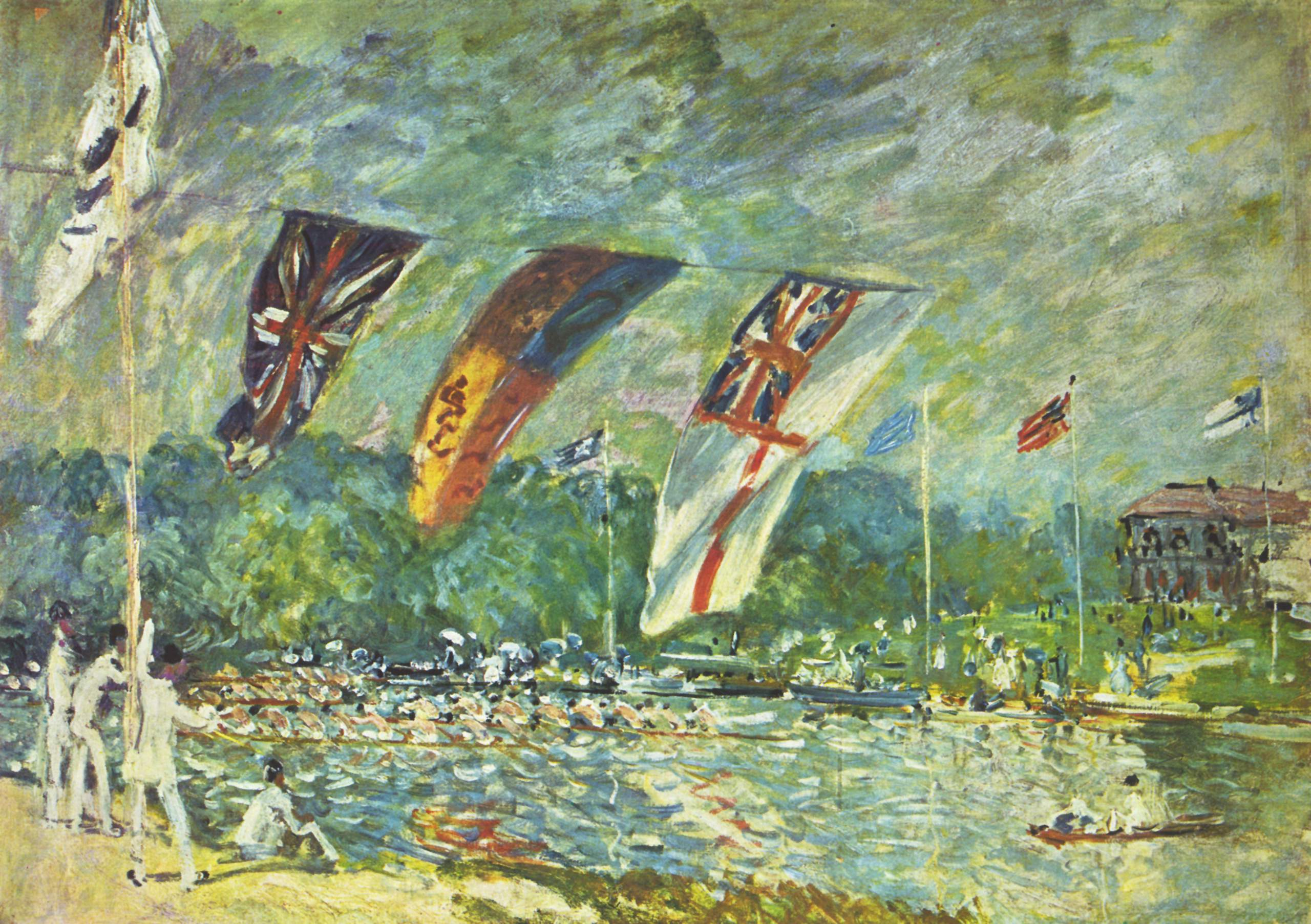
Regatta at Molesey near Hampton Court by Alfred Sisley, 1874.

Molesey Regatta is a rowing regatta that is held on the River Thames in England. It takes place at Molesey in the County of Surrey on the reach above Molesey Lock, with the finish line between Hurst Park which hosts all of its stalls and marquees and the wharf for a passenger ferry, which is cancelled during its divisions.

The event attracts crews from rowing clubs based at rivers and canals from around the United Kingdom. Racing takes place on the 850-metre downstream course that stretches from Platts Eyot. The main regatta takes place on Saturday, and the Molesey Junior Regatta, on a shorter course, takes place on Sunday.

The Regatta was established in 1867 and its main supporting club has been Molesey Boat Club. The Molesey Amateur (Note: For the historic, abolished distinction between 'Amateur' and 'Professional' rowers see British Rowing.) Regatta Committee also organizes the Molesey Veteran Head, held in the Spring about six weeks before the United Kingdom's Head of the River Race.

In 2007 the regatta was cancelled for the first time in its history due to river conditions. In 2020 the regatta was cancelled on account of COVID-19.

== See also ==
- Rowing on the River Thames

== Notes and references ==
Notes
