= Portrait of Clemenceau (Manet, Paris) =

1879–80 painting by Édouard Manet

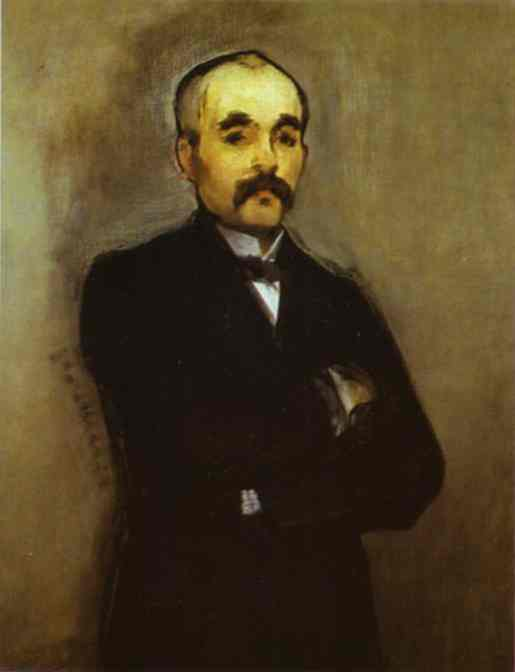
- Artist: Édouard Manet
- Year: 1879-1880
- Medium: oil on canvas
- Dimensions: 94.5 cm × 74 cm (37.2 in × 29 in)
- Location: Musée d'Orsay, Paris (France)

Portrait of Clemenceau is an oil painting on canvas of 1879–80 by Édouard Manet depicting Georges Clemenceau, now in the Musée d'Orsay. The work can be dated via two letters of 9 December 1879 and 8 January 1880 from their subject fixing sitting dates. Clemenceau was not happy with the work, stating "My portrait by Manet? Very bad, I don't have it and I don't mind that. It is at the Louvre, I ask myself why we put it there". But he enjoyed the sittings at Manet's home, enjoying the conversation and finding the painter very spiritual.

Manet's youngest brother Gustave was a municipal councillor in Paris and it may have been through his mediation that Manet met Clemenceau. Alternatively, the pair may have met at the home of Paul Meurice or Émile Zola. On Manet's death his daughter Suzanne gave the work to its subject. When Mary Cassatt brought her American friend Louisine Havemeyer to Clemenceau's home, Louisine sold her the work for 10,000 francs in 1905. Madame Havemeyer then donated it to the Musée du Louvre in 1927, from which it was later assigned to its present home.

== See also ==
- Portrait of Clemenceau (Manet, Fort Worth), Manet's larger 1872 work
- List of paintings by Édouard Manet
- 1880 in art

== Bibliography ==
- Françoise Cachin, Charles S. Moffett and Juliet Wilson-Bareau, Manet 1832–1883, Paris, Réunion des musées nationaux, 1983, p. 544 (ISBN 2-7118-0230-2)
- Adolphe Tabarant, Manet et ses œuvres, Paris, Gallimard, 1947, p. 600
- Adolphe Tabarant, Les Manet de la collection Havemeyer: La Renaissance de l'art français, Paris, 1930, XIII éd.
- Étienne Moreau-Nélaton, Manet raconté par lui-même, vol. 2, t. I, Paris, Henri Laurens, 1926
