= Dance Class at the Opera =

Painting by Edgar Degas

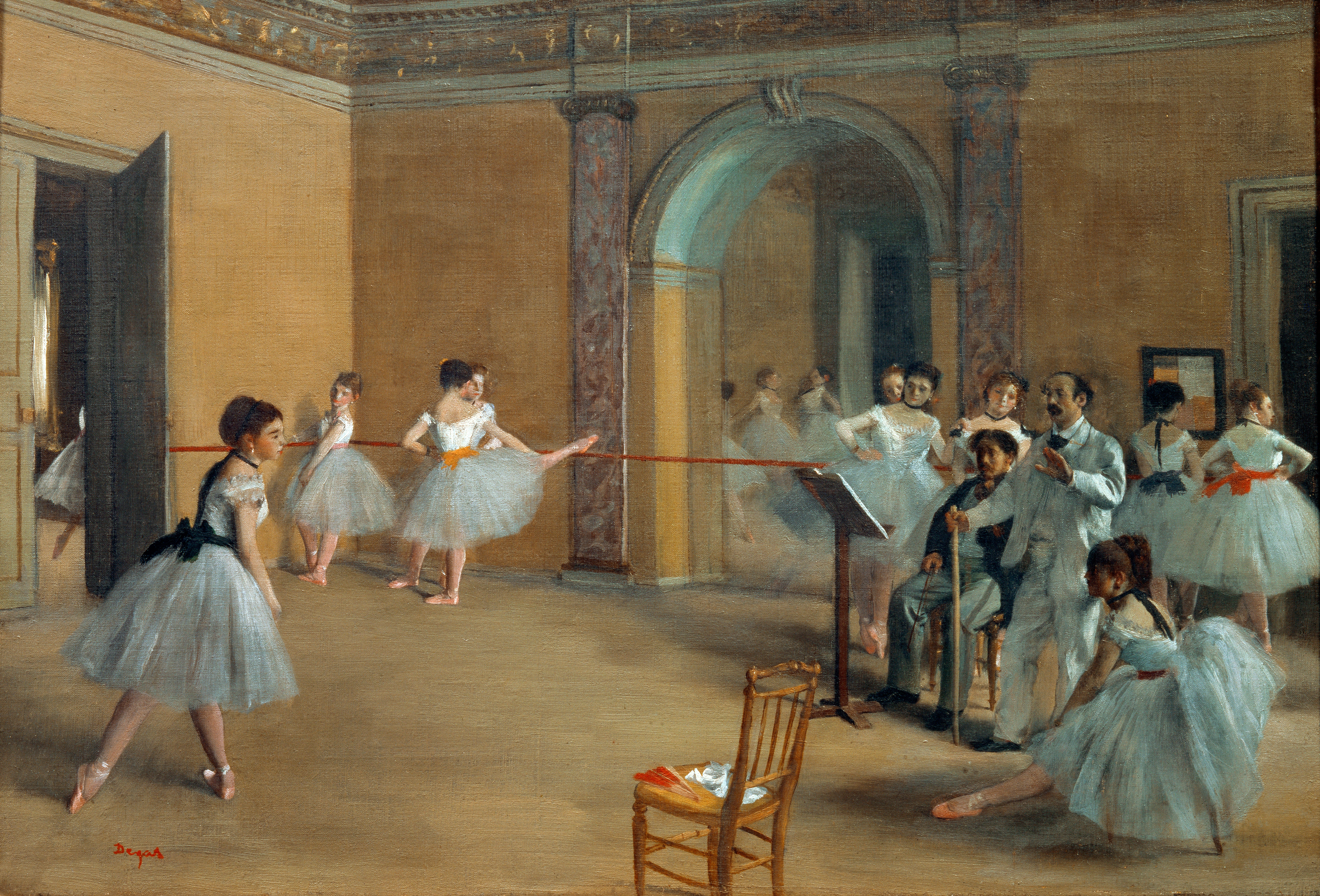
- Artist: Edgar Degas
- Year: c. 1872
- Medium: Oil on canvas
- Dimensions: 32.7 cm × 46.3 cm (12.9 in × 18.2 in)
- Location: Musée d'Orsay, Paris
- Accession: RF1977

Dance Class at the Opera is an oil on canvas painting by Edgar Degas from c. 1872. It measures 32.7 by 46.3 cm. It is in the collection of the Musée d'Orsay, in Paris.

== Description ==
The ballerinas are dressed in tutus during the lesson, with ribbons and their characteristic slippers. Each dancer has a different posture: one is waiting to begin her dance, others are practicing at the barre, and the girl on the right is resting.

One can see the ballet master standing on the right side, leaning on a cane with which he marks the rhythm and corrects the movements. He gestures with his hand to the dancer who is practicing, shown on the left side of the canvas, asking her for greater reserve and restraint.

Beside the master, a violinist is seated at a music stand. Around these figures are other dancers—some at the fixed barre along the back wall, others observing the scene.

In the painting, Degas chooses to depict the dancers as they finish their barre exercises and begin, one by one, their center work. On the left, we see Mademoiselle Hughes preparing to perform her exercise, while on the right, the master Louis-Alexandre Mérante, standing and dressed in white, gives his final recommendations. Next to him, to his left, a seated dancer, her face slightly in shadow, is drawn with particular precision. This especially idyllic and delicate scene is set in contrast by the violinist, who provides music during the rehearsal. Seated to the right of the ballet master, his dark clothing and heavy figure disrupt the harmony of the white tutus and yellow-ochre walls.

The composition is organized around a large empty central space, around which the figures are arranged. The space is expanded through the use of mirrors, which reflect other scenes, and through the open doorway. The atmospheric and lighting effects—light coming from the right, where we may assume a window is located—are perfectly achieved by softening the contours of the figures, though Degas retains a firmer foundation in drawing than the Impressionists.
