= Tea (James Tissot) =

Painting by James Tissot

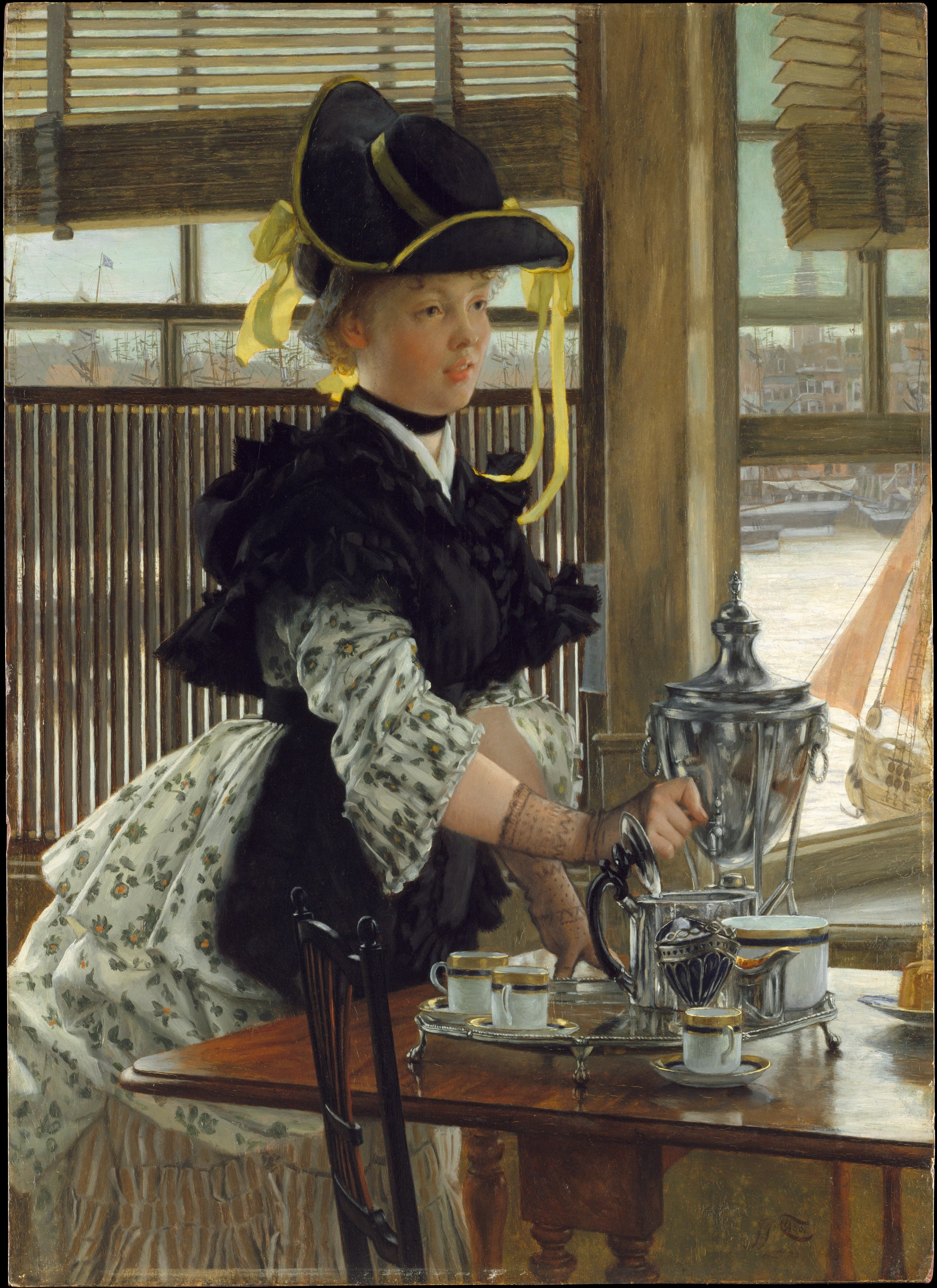
- Artist: James Tissot
- Year: 1872
- Medium: Oil on wood
- Dimensions: 66 cm × 47.9 cm (26 in × 18.9 in)
- Location: Metropolitan Museum of Art; New York City

Tea is a mid-19th century painting by French artist James Tissot. Done in oil on wood, the painting depicts a scene in which a young woman reacts to word that a captain is departing. Tea is itself a repetition of the left-hand side of a larger work by Tissot, Bad News. The work is in the collection of the Metropolitan Museum of Art.

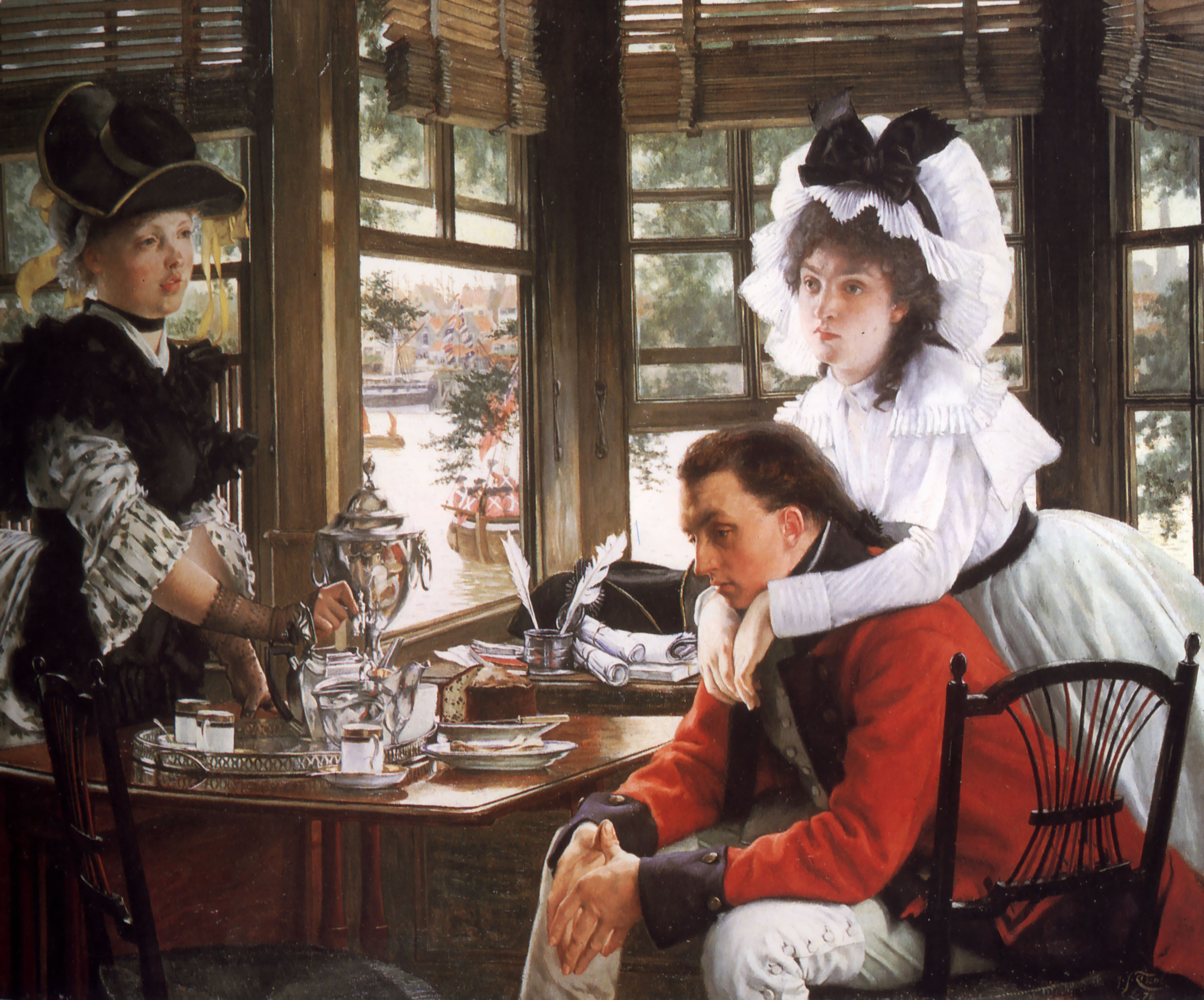
Bad News by James Tissot
