= Jean-Baptiste Capefigue =

French historian (1801–1872)

Jean-Baptiste Honoré Raymond Capefigue (1801 – December 1872) was a French historian and biographer.

He was born in Marseille, France. At the age of twenty he went to Paris to study law but soon switched to journalism. He became editor of the Quotidienne, and was afterwards connected, either as editor or leading contributor, with the Temps, the Messager des Chambres, the Revolution de 1848 and other papers.

During the ascendancy of the House of Bourbon, he held a post in the foreign office, which was due to the royalism of some of his newspaper articles (some of which were collected in his Diplomatists of Europe, his only English-translated work). Indeed, all Capefigue's works are influenced by his legitimist politics; he believed in the divine right of kings and non-resistance, and found polite words even for the profligacy of Louis XV and the worthlessness of his mistresses.

He wrote biographies of Catherine de' Medici and Marie de Medici, Anne of Austria, Maria Theresa of Austria, Catherine the Great of Russia, Elizabeth I of England, Diana of Poitiers, and Agnès Sorel — for he delighted in passing from "queens of the right hand" to "queens of the left."

His historical works, besides histories of the Jews from the fall of the Maccabees to the author's time, of the first four centuries of the Christian church, and of European diplomatists, extend over the whole range of French history. He died at Paris.

The general catalogue of printed books for the Bibliothèque Nationale contains no fewer than seventy-seven works (145 volumes) published by Capefigue during forty years. Of these only the Histoire de Philipp-Auguste (4 vols., 1829) and the Histoire de la réforme, de la ligue et du règne de Henri IV (8 vols., 1834–1835) perhaps deserve still to be remembered.

Capefigue was hasty, and although he had access to an exceptionally large number of sources of information, including the state papers, his accuracy and judgment are doubtful. Nonetheless, he was frequently cited by the Scottish historian Sir Archibald Alison in his highly successful History of Europe During the French Revolution.
