= Rue de la Chaussée in Argenteuil =

1872 painting by Alfred Sisley

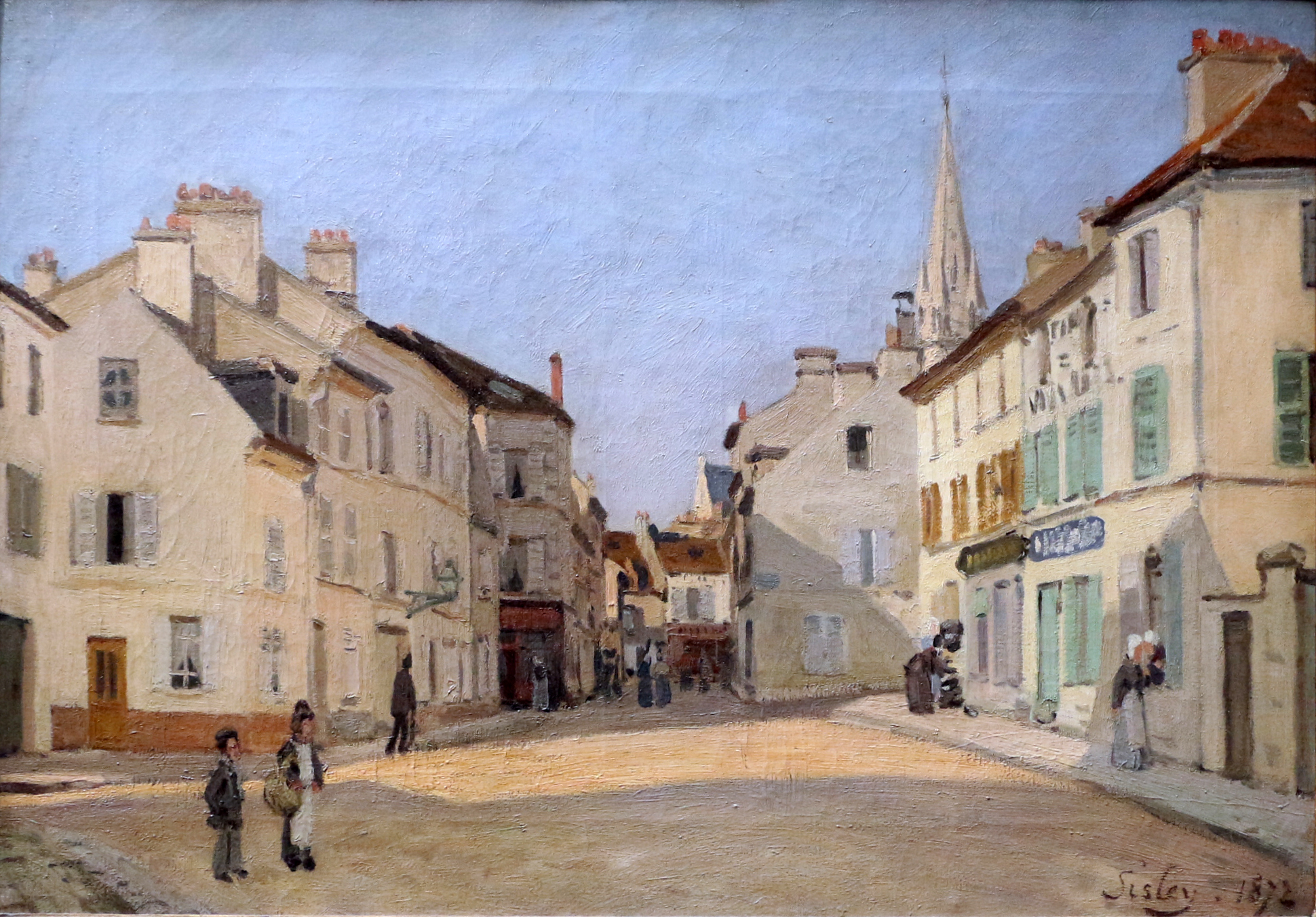
- Artist: Alfred Sisley
- Year: 1872
- Medium: oil on canvas
- Dimensions: 44 cm × 66 cm (17 in × 26 in)
- Location: Musée d'Orsay, Paris (France)

Rue de la Chaussée in Argenteuil or A Square in Argenteuil is an 1872 painting by Alfred Sisley, now in the Musée d'Orsay, where it has hung since 1986. It was left to the French state in 1906 by Étienne Moreau-Nélaton, who had bought it earlier that year from François Depeaux's collection via the art dealer Georges Petit.

== Production ==
Sisley painted several works of Argenteuil and the neighbouring stretches of the Seine, probably on frequent visits to his friend Claude Monet, who had moved to the village in December 1871. In spring 1872 Monet painted Camille and Sisley's companion Marie-Eugénie in a garden.

Sisley also made use of Monet's boat-studio to paint near the île Marande. At least twice the two artists set up their easels next to each other - in 1872 both artists painted works entitled Rue de la Chaussée in Argenteuil and Boulevard Héloïse, Argenteuil, though Shone argues Sisley's works have a more balanced composition, particularly Rue, with tones reminiscent of Jean-Baptiste Camille Corot.

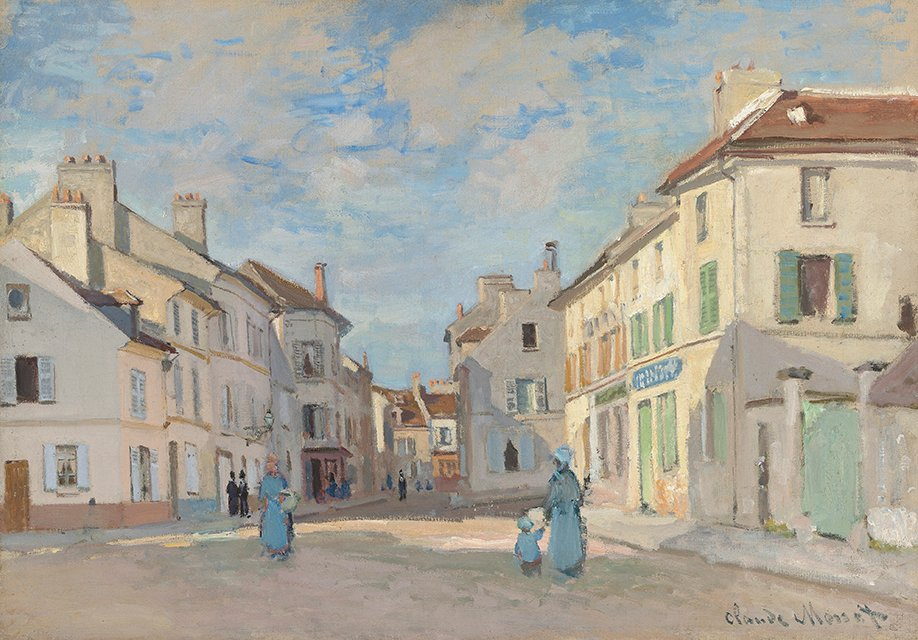
Claude Monet Rue de la Chaussée, Argenteuil, 1872, private collection.

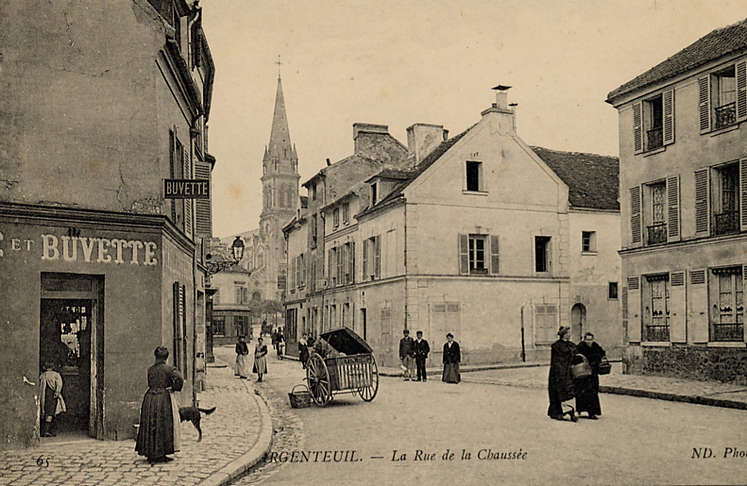
Junction of rue de la Chaussée and rue Notre Dame in the 1900s.

== See also ==
- List of paintings by Alfred Sisley
