= An Interesting Story (painting) =

Painting by James Tissot

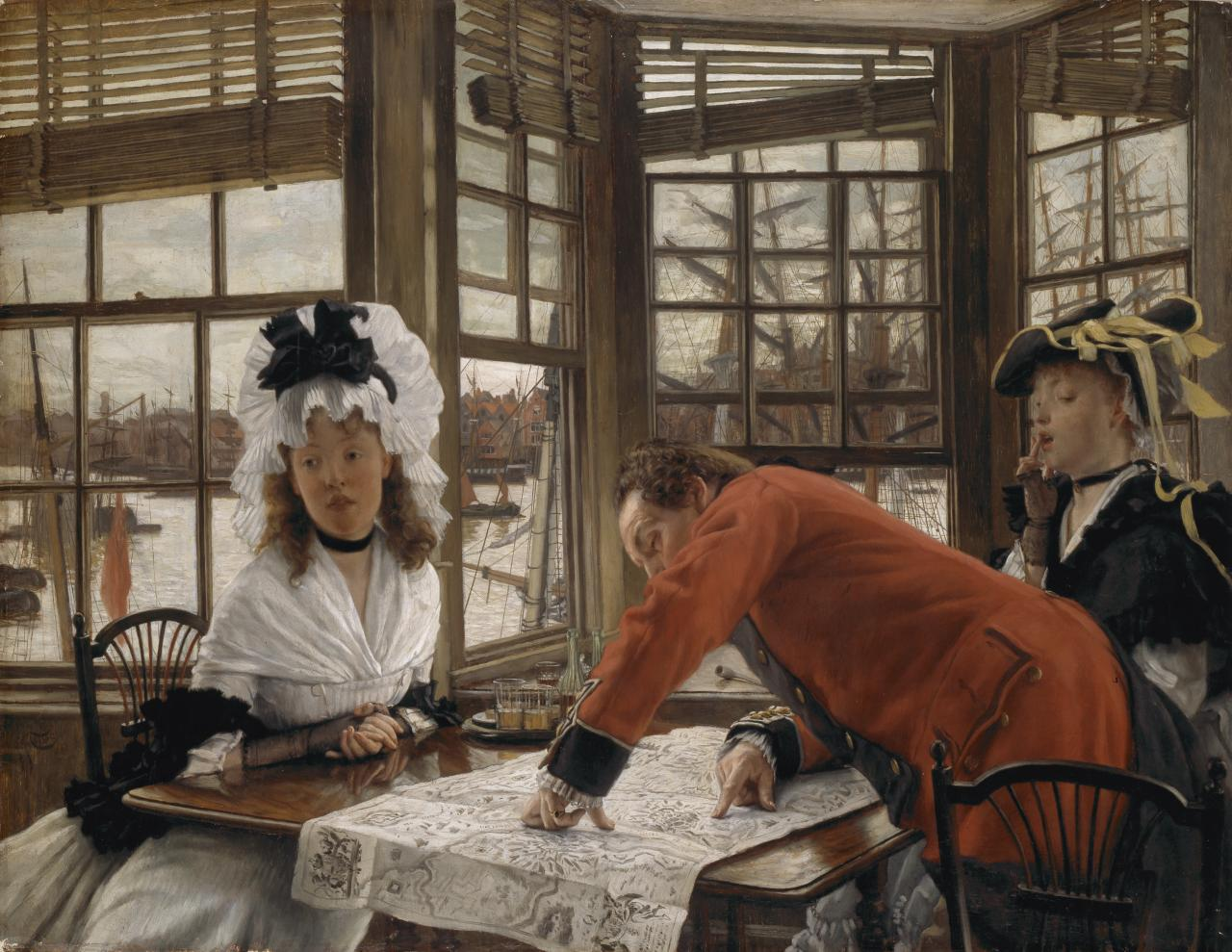
- Artist: James Tissot
- Year: 1872
- Type: Oil on panel, genre painting
- Dimensions: 59.7 cm × 76.6 cm (23.5 in × 30.2 in)
- Location: National Gallery of Victoria, Melbourne

An Interesting Story is an oil on panel genre painting by the French artist James Tissot, from 1872. It is held at the National Gallery of Victoria, in Melbourne.

== History and description ==
It depicts a scene in an English riverside tavern during the eighteenth century. The title is intended to be ironic, since the bored fashionably-dressed woman seems not to be that much interested as she stares into the distance rather than at the army officer with the map on front of him, regaling them with his exploits. The response of the other young woman is more ambiguous. Tissot created another painting of a similar scene more accurately titled The Tedious Story.

Tissot had moved to Britain following the Franco-Prussian War.The painting was displayed at the Royal Academy Exhibition of 1872 at Burlington House in London. Today the work is in the National Gallery of Victoria, in Melbourne, having been acquired in 1938.

== Bibliography ==
- Kern, Stephen. Eyes of Love: The Gaze in English and French Paintings and Novels, 1840–1900. Reaktion Books, 1996.
- Marshall, Nancy Rose & Warner, Malcolm. James Tissot: Victorian Life, Modern Love. Yale University Press, 1999.
