= Alfred-Auguste Cuvillier-Fleury =

French historian (1802–1887)

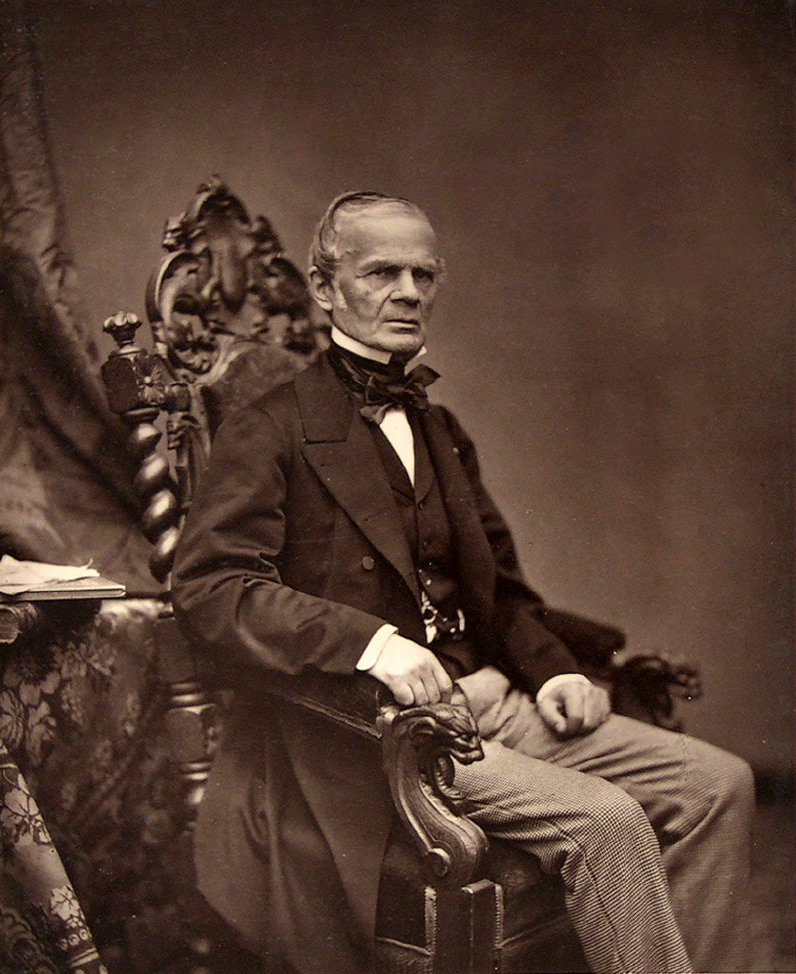
Alfred-Auguste Cuvillier-Fleury, photo by Antoine Samuel Adam-Salomon.

Alfred-Auguste Cuvillier-Fleury (18 March 1802, Paris – 18 October 1887, Paris) was a French historian and literary critic.

== Biography ==
Préfet des études at the collège Sainte-Barbe in Paris and preceptor of Henri d'Orléans, duc d'Aumale, from 1827 to 1839, he then became Henri's special secretary. He contributed to the Journal des Débats. He was elected to the Académie française in 1866.

In 1830 he published Documents historiques sur M. le comte Lavalette and edited the Mémoires of Lavalette's daughter (and Cuvillier-Fleury's lover), Joséphine de Lavalette. Although none of the works he published was reissued in his lifetime, his Correspondance avec le duc d'Aumale, as well as his Journal intime, remain important sources on the history of Orléanism.

== Main works ==
- Portraits politiques et révolutionnaires volume I, volume II (1851)
- Voyages et voyageurs (1854)
- Nouvelles études historiques et littéraires (1855)
- Dernières études historiques et littéraires volume I, volume II (1859)
- Historiens, poètes et romanciers (1863)
- Études et portraits (1865–68)
- Posthumes et revenants (1878)
- Journal intime (1903)
- Correspondance du Duc d'Aumale et de Cuvillier-Fleury (1910)
