= Ustazade Silvestre de Sacy =

French journalist (1801–1879)

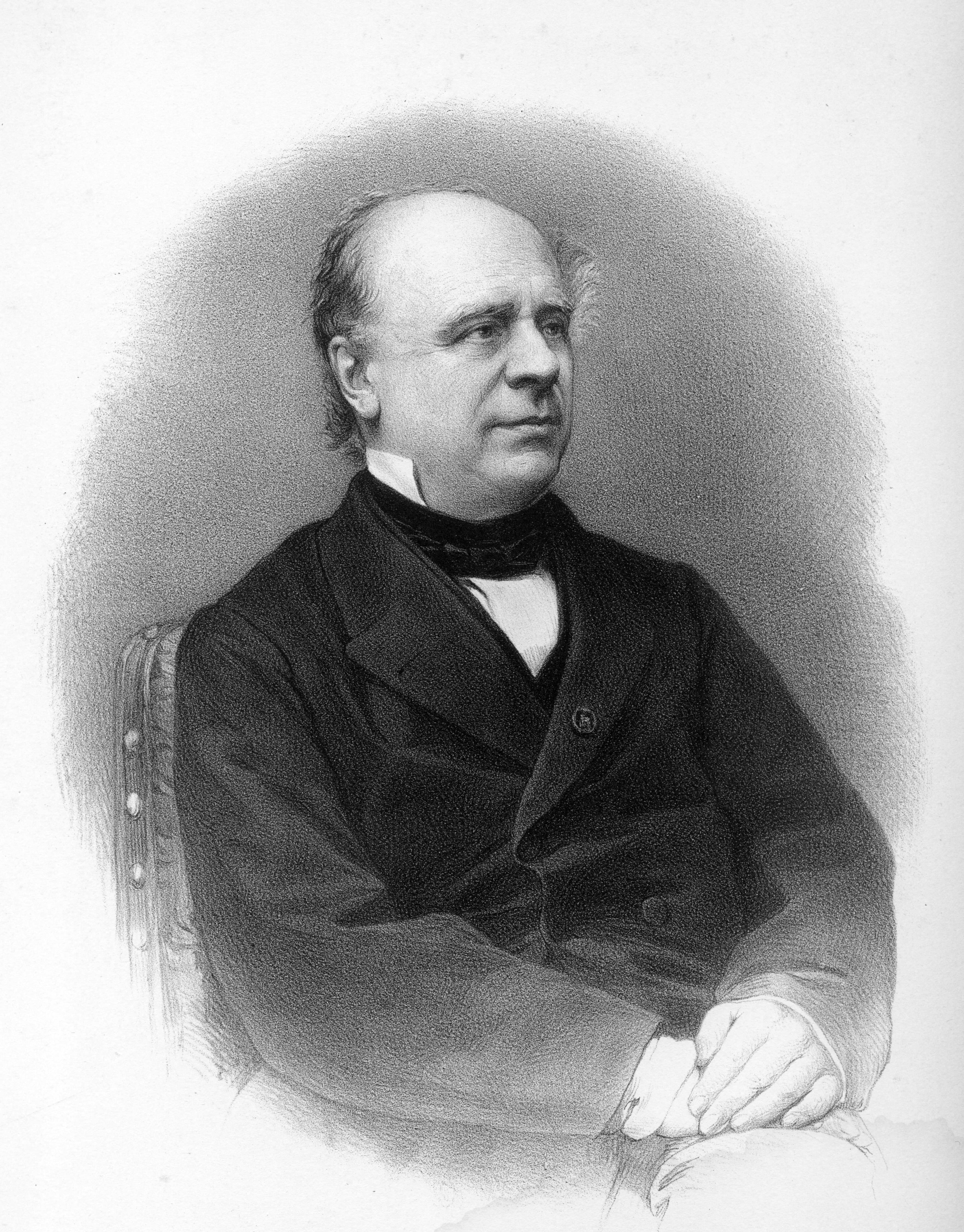
- Born: Samuel Ustazade Silvestre de Sacy; 17 October 1801 Paris, France
- Died: 14 February 1879 (aged 77) Paris, France
- Occupation: Journalist
- Relatives: Antoine Isaac Silvestre de Sacy (father)

Ustazade Silvestre de Sacy (17 October 1801 – 14 February 1879) was a French journalist. He was born in Paris, the son of the linguist Antoine-Isaac Silvestre de Sacy (1758–1838), who in 1813, was created a baron by Napoleon. His name "Ustazade" means "son of the master" in Persian, presumably due to his father's status as a celebrated orientalist. From 1828 to 1877, he was a literary and political contributor to the Journal des Débats. He became a curator at the Bibliothèque Mazarine in 1836 and became its administrator in 1848. He was elected to the Académie française on 18 May 1854, and became a senator in 1865.
