= Still-Life with Fruit (Courbet) =

Series of paintings by Gustave Coubert

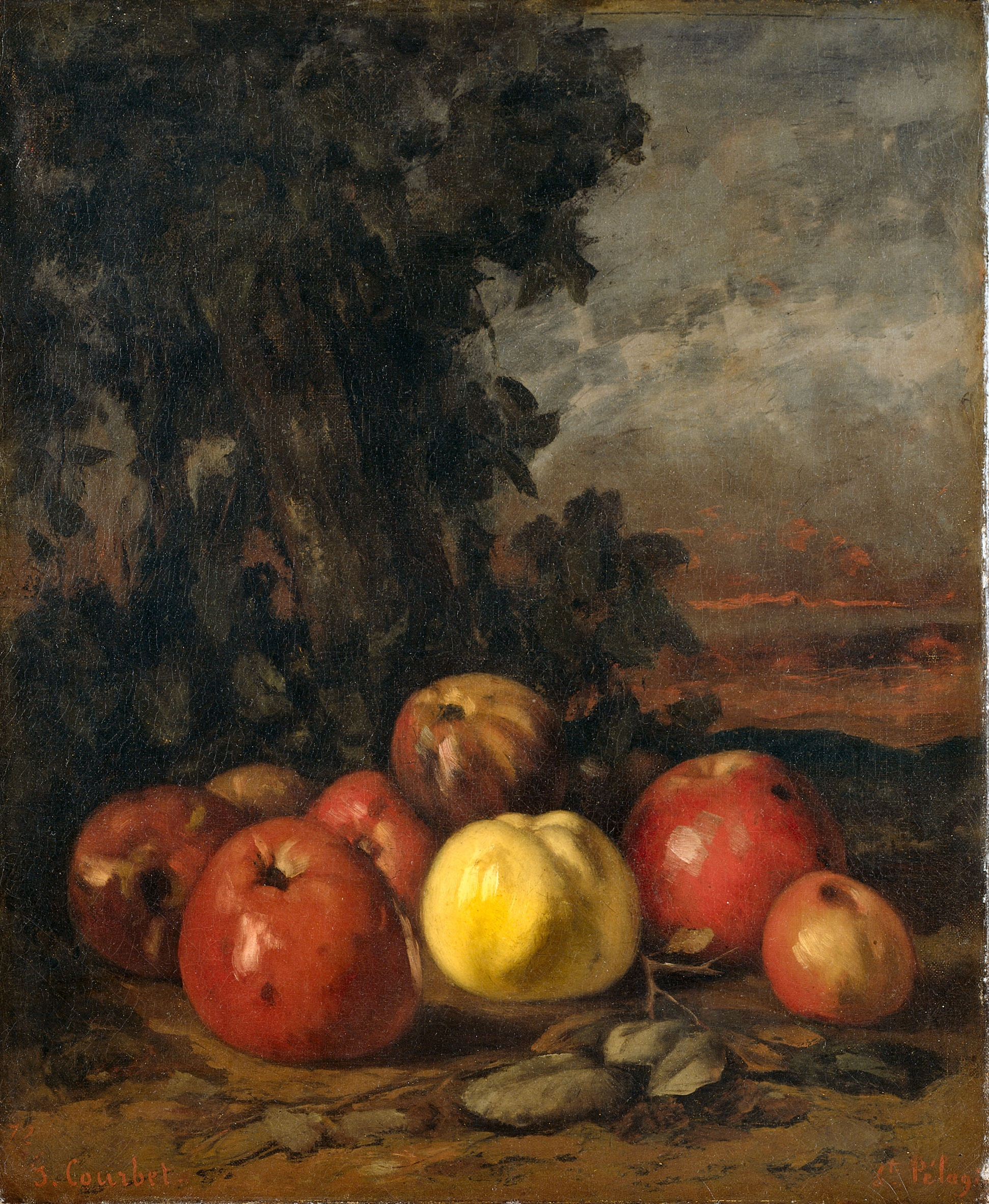
Still Life with Apples (1872)

Still-Life with Fruit (French - Nature morte aux fruits) is a series of still life paintings produced between 1871 and 1872 by Gustave Courbet, marking his return to painting after the silence forced on him by the Franco-Prussian War, the Paris Commune, imprisonment and illness.

== List ==
| Title | Dimensions (cm) | City | Collection | Catalogue no. | Entered collection |
|---|---|---|---|---|---|
| Still Life with Apples | 59 x 73 | The Hague | Mesdag Collection | F.770 | 1903 |
| Red Apples at the Foot of a Tree | 50.5 x 61.5 | Munich | Neue Pinakothek | F.771 | 1911 |
| Fruit in a Basket | 60 x 73 | Shelburne | Shelburne Museum | F.776 | |
| Apples and Pears (garden table) | 46 x 56 | Copenhagen | Ny Carlsberg Glyptotek | F.777 | 1953 |
| Apples and Pears | 24 x 32.5 | Philadelphia | Philadelphia Museum of Art | F.778 | 1963 |
| Still Life, Apples and Pomegranates | 44 x 61 | London | National Gallery | NG5983 | 1951 |
| Still Life with Apples and Pears | 27.5 x 46.5 | London | William Morris Gallery | BrO28 | 1935 |
| Pomegranates | 26.7 x 34.9 | Glasgow | Glasgow Museums | 35.67 | 1944 |
| Apple, Pear, Orange | 13 x 20.7 | Glasgow | Glasgow Museums | 2384 | 1944 |
| Fruit | 17.8 x 36.8 | Glasgow | Burrell Collection | 35.66 | 1944 |
| Still Life with Peaches | 27.3 x 50.5 | Perth | Perth Museum and Art Gallery | | Unknown, donated by Robert Browne |
| Still Life with Apples | 59 x 48 | Amsterdam | Rijksmuseum | | 1900 |
| Still Life with Fruits : Apples and Pomegranates | 22 x 27 | Paris | Musée d'Orsay | | 1948 (Alger) then 1986 |
| Apples, Pears and Primulas on a Table | 59.7 x 73 | Pasadena | Norton Simon Museum | | |
| Bunch of Grapes | 40.5 x 32.3 | Paris | Petit Palais | PPP574 | 1913 |
| Grapes | 20 x 25 | Lisieux | Musée d'art et d'histoire | MBA.97.7.1 | 1893 |
| Still Life with Apples, Pears and Pomegranates | 27.3 x 41.2 | Dallas | Dallas Museum of Art | | 1985 |
| Still Life | 30 x 40 ? | Unknown, possibly Russia | François de Hatvany collection, looted in 1944 | | |
