= François-Victor Équilbecq =

French author

François-Victor Équilbecq (1872–1917) was a French author of works on the customs and folklore from French West Africa.

== Works ==
- La légende de Samba Guélâdio Digui Prince du Foûta
- Essai sur la littérature merveilleuse des noirs, suivi de Contes indigènes de l'Ouest africain français (1913)
