= Regatta at Argenteuil =

1872 painting by Claude Monet

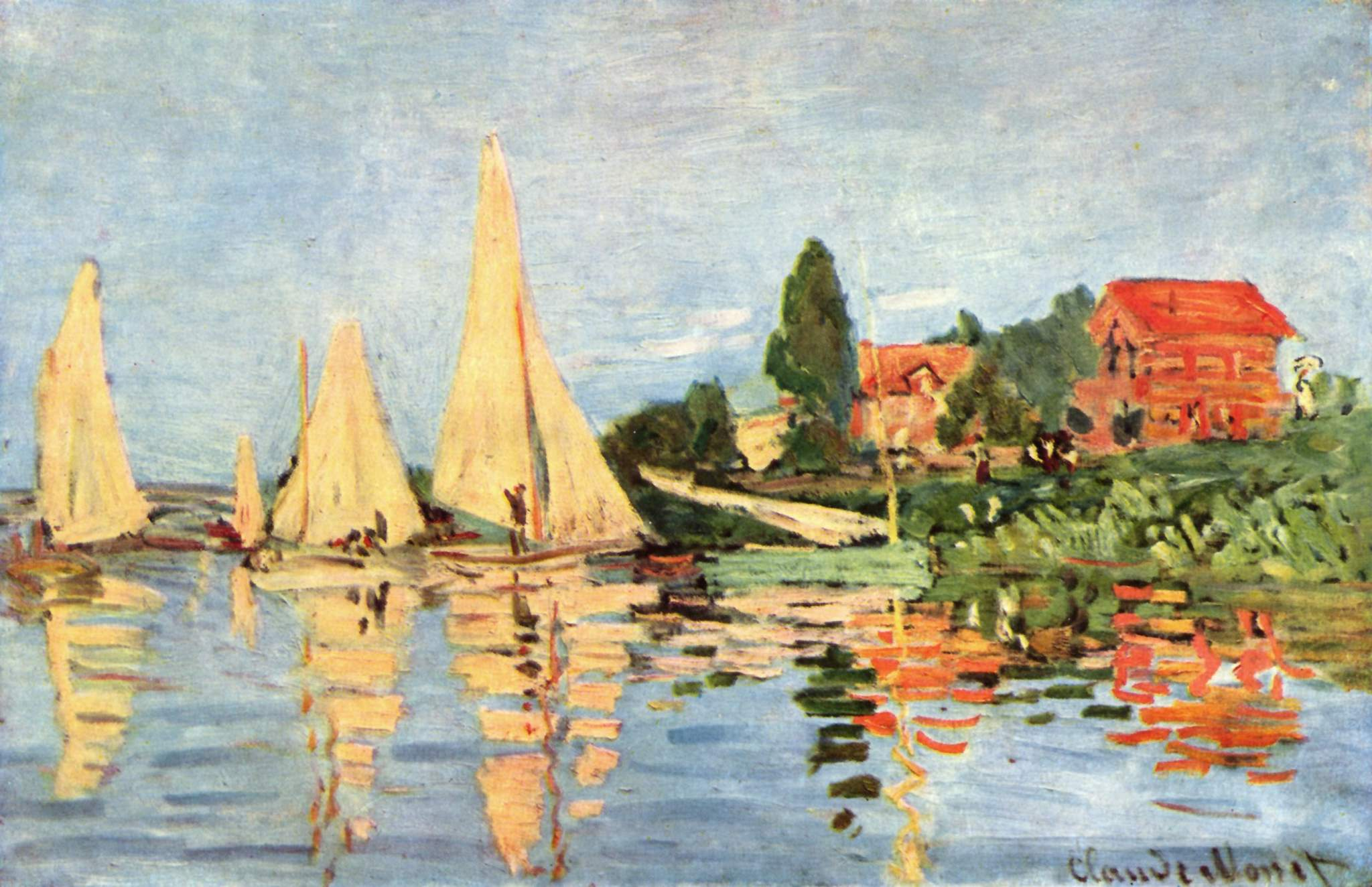
- Artist: Claude Monet
- Year: 1872
- Dimensions: 98 cm × 75.3 cm (39 in × 29.6 in)
- Location: Musée d'Orsay; Paris

Regatta at Argenteuil is a c. 1872 painting by Claude Monet, now in the Musée d'Orsay. It was left to the French state in 1894 by the painter and collector Gustave Caillebotte.

== See also ==
- List of paintings by Claude Monet
