= Frederick Kill Harford =

English clergyman, musician, poet and hymn writer

Frederick Kill Harford (1832 - 11 November 1906) was an English clergyman, musician, poet, hymn writer and pioneer of music therapy. He founded the Guild of St Cecilia in 1891, where members would perform live music to patients in hospitals.

Harford was the third son of Henry Charles Harford and grew up in Clifton near Bristol. He studied at Rugby School and matriculated at Christ Church, Oxford in 1850, graduating B.A. at New Inn Hall in 1855 and M.A. in 1858. He was ordained as a deacon by the Archbishop of Canterbury and later served as a priest and Chaplain to the Bishop of Gibraltar (1858-1861). He also served as Minor Canon, Westminster Abbey. He was an associate of the Royal Academy of Music and a friend of Gustave Doré. Harford experimented on music and its healing properties particularly on the mentally ill and wrote about its possible role in reducing pain from physical ailments such as gout. His work on music as therapy received acclaim from Florence Nightingale and Sir Richard Quain. He founded the Guild of St. Cecilia, named after Saint Cecilia the patron saint of music.
