= Portrait of Clemenceau (Manet, Fort Worth) =

1872 painting by Édouard Manet

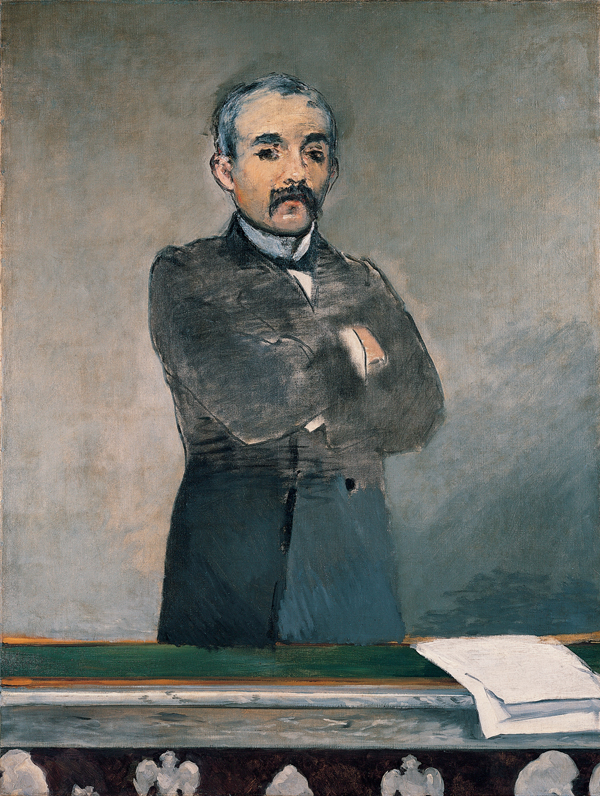
- Artist: Édouard Manet
- Year: 1879-1880
- Medium: oil on canvas
- Dimensions: 115.9 cm × 88.2 cm (45.6 in × 34.7 in)
- Location: Kimbell Art Museum, Fort Worth, Texas

Portrait of Clemenceau is an 1879-1880 painting by Édouard Manet of the French statesman Georges Clemenceau in the Kimbell Art Museum in Fort Worth, Texas.

Manet's youngest brother Gustave was a municipal councillor in Paris and it may have been through his mediation that Manet met Clemenceau. Alternatively, the pair may have met at the home of Paul Meurice or Émile Zola.

The portrait was produced at the tribune of the Jardin du Luxembourg, where the city council was sitting; it is sometimes entitled Portrait of Clemenceau at the Tribune. Less realist than the later work of the same title, it stayed in the artist's studio for a long period.

== See also ==
- List of paintings by Édouard Manet
- 1880 in art
- The museum's Catalogue entry

== Bibliography ==
- Cachin, Françoise; Moffett, Charles S.; Wilson-Bareau, Juliet (1983). Manet, 1832-1883 : Galeries nationales du Grand Palais, Paris, 22 avril-1er août 1983, Metropolitan Museum of Art, New York, 10 septembre-27 novembre 1983 (in French). Paris: Ministère de la Culture Éditions de la Réunion des musées nationaux. ISBN 2-7118-0230-2. OCLC 9663346.
- Adolphe Tabarant, Manet et ses œuvres, Paris, Gallimard, 1947, p. 600
- Étienne Moreau-Nélaton, Manet raconté par lui-même, vol. 2, t. I, Paris, Henri Laurens, 1926
