= 1813 in France =

- Decades: 1790s; 1800s; 1810s; 1820s; 1830s
- See also: History of France; Timeline of French history; List of years in France

Events from the year 1813 in France.

== Incumbents ==
- Emperor – Napoleon I

== Events ==
- 7 February - Action of 7 February 1813, stalemate between two evenly matched frigates Aréthuse and HMS Amelia
- 2 May - Battle of Lützen, French victory over a combined Prussian and Russian force.
- 20 May–21 May - Battle of Bautzen, French victory over a combined Russian/Prussian army.
- 3 June-11 June - Peninsular War: Siege of Tarragona, Anglo-Spanish-Portuguese forces fail to capture port from its Franco-Italian garrison.
- 21 June - Peninsular War: Battle of Vitoria, decisive victory by Anglo-Spanish-Portuguese forces.
- 7 July - Peninsular War: Siege of San Sebastian by Anglo-Portuguese forces begins.
- 25 July - Peninsular War: Battle of Maya, French victory over British forces.
- 25 July - Peninsular War: Battle of Roncesvalles, French victory over Anglo-Portuguese forces.
- 25 July - Peninsular War: Battle of the Pyrenees, large-scale French offensive, starts.
- 2 August - Peninsular War: Battle of the Pyrenees ends in a tactical Anglo-Spanish-Portuguese victory.
- 23 August - Battle of Großbeeren, French defeated by an allied Prussian-Swedish army.
- 26 August - Battle of Katzbach, French defeat by Russo-Prussian army.
- 26 August-27 August - Battle of Dresden results in French victory.
- 30 August - Battle of Kulm, French defeated by Austrian, Russian, and Prussian forces.
- 31 August - Peninsular War: Battle of San Marcial, Spanish victory over French army.
- 6 September - Battle of Dennewitz, Prussians and Russians victory over French forces.
- 9 September - Peninsular War: Siege of San Sebastian ends with surrender of French garrison.
- 16 October-19 October - Battle of Leipzig, one of the most decisive defeats suffered by Napoleon Bonaparte.
- 7 October - Peninsular War: Battle of the Bidassoa, tactical Anglo-Portuguese victory over French forces.
- 30 October-31 October - Battle of Hanau, tactical French victory over Austro-Bavarian forces.
- 10 November - Peninsular War: Battle of Nivelle, French defeated by British, Portuguese and Spanish forces.
- 11 December - By the Treaty of Valençay, Napoleon recognises his prisoner Ferdinand VII as King of Spain and releases him.
- 9 December-13 December - Peninsular War: Battle of the Nive, Anglo-Portuguese-Spanish army defeats French forces.
- 31 December (New Year's Eve) - Prussian forces under Gebhard Leberecht von Blücher cross the Rhine beginning the invasion of France.

== Births ==
- 23 April - Frédéric Ozanam, lawyer, literary scholar, journalist and social reformer, founder of the Society of Saint Vincent de Paul (died 1853)
- 12 July - Francisque Bouillier, philosopher (died 1899)
- 18 July - Pierre Alphonse Laurent, mathematician (died 1854)
- 15 August - Léon Gastinel, composer (died 1906)
- 23 October - Félix Ravaisson-Mollien, philosopher and archaeologist (died 1900)
- 29 October - Eugène Pelletan, writer, journalist and politician (died 1884)
- 30 November - Charles-Valentin Alkan, composer and pianist (died 1888)
- December - Pauline Duvernay, dancer (died 1894)
- 22 December - Jean-Jacques Bourassé, priest, archaeologist and historian (died 1872)

== Deaths ==
- 2 January - Pedro de Almeida Portugal, 3rd Marquis of Alorna, general in French service (born 1754 in Portugal)
- 6 January - Louis Baraguey d'Hilliers, general (born 1764)
- 9 March - Louise Contat, actress (born 1760)
- 19 March - Jean Baptiste, baron Franceschi, general (born 1766)
- 1 May - Jean-Baptiste Bessières, Marshal of France (born 1768)
- 23 May - Geraud Duroc, general (born 1772)
- 6 June - Alexandre-Théodore Brongniart, architect (born 1739)
- 26 June - Jacques Thomas Sarrut, military commander (born 1765)
- 23 July - Léger-Félicité Sonthonax, Jacobin and abolitionist (born 1763)
- 29 July - Jean-Andoche Junot, general (born 1771)
- 11 August - André Joseph Boussart, general (born 1758)
- 1 September - Edmé-Martin Vandermaesen, general (born 1767)
- 2 September - Jean Victor Marie Moreau, general (born 1763)
- 16 October - Donatien-Marie-Joseph de Vimeur, vicomte de Rochambeau, soldier (born 1755)
- 11 November - Nicolas François Conroux, military commander (born 1770)
- 12 November - J. Hector St. John de Crevecoeur, writer on America (born 1735)
- 13 December - Antoine-Augustin Parmentier, nutritionist (born 1737)
