= 1848 in France =

- Decades: 1820s; 1830s; 1840s; 1850s; 1860s
- See also: History of France; Timeline of French history; List of years in France

The year 1848 in France, like other European countries, is mostly remembered as the year of a revolution that deposed king Louis Philippe and brought Napoleon III to power as president of the second republic.

== Incumbents ==
- Monarch – Louis Philippe I (deposed 24 February, monarchy abolished)

== Events ==
- 22 February - In Paris, revolt erupts against the king, Louis Philippe I. Two days later he abdicates.
- 23 February - Prime Minister François Guizot resigns.
- 26 February - Provisional government is organised called the Second Republic.
- 7 March - The Provisional government establishes the Comptoir national d'escompte de Paris, a national bank which is the earliest predecessor of BNP Paribas.
- 23 April - Constituent Assembly election held.
- 24 April - Constituent Assembly election held.
- 27 April - Slavery is abolished in France.
- 6 May - Executive Commission of the French Republic is set up, jointly heads of state during the Second Republic.
- 15 May - Radicals invade the Chamber of deputies.
- 23 June - June Days Uprising begins after closure of the National Workshops created by the Second Republic to give work to the unemployed.
- 25 June - June Days Uprising ends with 1,500 killed; 15,000 prisoners were deported to Algeria.
- 28 June - Term of the Executive Commission of the French Republic ends.
- 28 August - Louisy Mathieu becomes the first black member to join the French parliament, as a representative of Guadeloupe.
- 4 November - France ratifies a new constitution. The Second Republic of France is set up, ending the state of temporary government lasting since the Revolution of 1848.
- 10 December - Presidential election held. Louis-Napoléon Bonaparte is elected president of the French Republic.
- 20 December - President Bonaparte takes his oath of office in front of the French National Assembly.

== Births ==
- 21 January - Henri Duparc, composer (died 1933)
- 4 February - Jean Aicard, poet, dramatist and novelist (died 1921)
- 5 February - Joris-Karl Huysmans, novelist (died 1907)
- 14 February - Benjamin Baillaud, astronomer (died 1934)
- 16 February - Octave Mirbeau, journalist, art critic, pamphleteer, novelist and playwright (died 1917)
- 10 April - Hubertine Auclert, feminist and campaigner for women's suffrage (died 1914)
- 7 June - Paul Gauguin, painter (died 1903)
- 28 June - Jean Bourdeau, writer (died 1928)
- 4 July - Louis-Robert Carrier-Belleuse, painter and sculptor (died 1913)
- 31 July - Robert Planquette, composer of songs and operettas (died 1903)
- 19 August - Gustave Caillebotte, Impressionist painter (died 1894)
- 22 September - Jules Coutan, sculptor (died 1939)
- 3 October - Henry Lerolle, painter, art collector and patron (died 1929)
- 1 November - Jules Bastien-Lepage, painter (died 1884)
- 22 November - Henri de Gaulle, bureaucrat, teacher and father of Charles de Gaulle (died 1932)

== Deaths ==
- 2 February - Rosalie Lamorlière, last servant of Marie Antoinette (born 1768)
- 17 February - Jean-Antoine Dubois, Catholic missionary in India (born 1765)
- 29 February - Louis-François, Baron Lejeune, general, painter and lithographer (born 1775)
- 8 March - Delphine Delamare, housewife and suicide (born 1822)
- 15 March - Ferdinand de Géramb, Trappist monk (born 1772)
- 27 March - Claude Charles Marie du Campe de Rosamel, politician and naval officer (born 1774)
- 21 May - Pierre Wantzel, mathematician (born 1814)
- 27 June - Denis Auguste Affre, Archbishop of Paris (born 1793)
- 28 June - Jean-Baptiste Debret, painter (born 1768)
- 4 July - François-René de Chateaubriand, writer, politician and diplomat (born 1768)
- 3 September - François, duc de La Rochefoucauld (born 1765)
- 3 November - Jean Vatout, poet and historian (born 1791)
- 2 December - Charles-Alexandre Léon Durand Linois, admiral (born 1761)
- 14 December - Jean Antoine Letronne, archaeologist (born 1787)
- 28 December - Louis François Cauchy, government official (born 1760)
