= 1845 in France =

- Decades: 1820s; 1830s; 1840s; 1850s; 1860s
- See also: History of France; Timeline of French history; List of years in France

Events from the year 1845 in France.

== Incumbents ==
- Monarch – Louis Philippe I

== Events ==
- 12 October – The Société Mathématique de France was founded.
- 20 November – Battle of Vuelta de Obligado between the Argentine Confederation and an Anglo-French fleet on the waters of the Paraná River.

== Arts and literature ==
- 1845 – Mérimée writes Carmen
- 1845 – Alexandre Dumas writes La Reine Margot

== Births ==
- 27 March – Louis Théophile Joseph Landouzy, neurologist (died 1917)
- 12 May – Henri Brocard, meteorologist and mathematician (died 1922)
- 12 May – Gabriel Fauré, composer, organist and pianist (died 1924)
- 18 June – Charles Louis Alphonse Laveran, physician, awarded 1907 Nobel Prize for Physiology or Medicine (died 1922)
- 18 July – Tristan Corbière, poet (died 1875)
- 19 August – Edmond James de Rothschild, philanthropist (died 1934)
- 11 September – Émile Baudot, telegraph engineer (died 1903)
- 9 October – Ferdinand Arnodin, engineer and industrialist (died 1924)
- 30 October – Antonin Mercié, sculptor and painter (died 1916)

=== Full date unknown ===
- Cécile Bruyère, abbess (died 1909)
- Jules Develle, politician (died 1919)
- Jean-Camille Formigé, architect (died 1926)

== Deaths ==
- 4 January – Léopold Boilly, painter (born 1761)
- 13 March – Charles-Guillaume Étienne, dramatist and writer (born 1778)
- 17 March – Pierre François Marie Auguste Dejean, entomologist (born 1780)
- 30 March – Alexandre Soumet, poet (born 1788)
- 9 April – Honoré Théodore Maxime Gazan de la Peyrière, general (born 1765)
- 21 August – Vincent-Marie Viénot, Count of Vaublanc, politician, writer and artist (born 1756)
- 23 August – Amédée Louis Michel le Peletier, comte de Saint-Fargeau, entomologist (born 1770)

=== Full date unknown ===
- Pierre Hyacinthe Azais, philosopher (born 1766)
- Éléonore-Louis Godefroi Cavaignac, politician (born 1801)
- Philippe de Girard, engineer and inventor of the first flax spinning frame (born 1775)
- Jean Henri Jaume Saint-Hilaire, naturalist and artist (born 1772)
