= 1844 in France =

- Decades: 1820s; 1830s; 1840s; 1850s; 1860s
- See also: History of France; Timeline of French history; List of years in France

Events from the year 1844 in France.

== Incumbents ==
- Monarch – Louis Philippe I

== Events ==
- 6 August - First Franco-Moroccan War begins.
- 14 August – Battle of Isly, French victory over Moroccan forces near Oujda, Morocco, ending the First Franco-Moroccan War.
- 28 August – Friedrich Engels and Karl Marx meet in Paris.
- 10 September – Treaty of Tangiers, whereby Morocco officially recognized Algeria as part of the French Empire.
- 24 October – Treaty of Whampoa, a commercial treaty between France and China, is signed.
- French Industrial Exposition of 1844

== Births ==
- 7 January – St. Bernadette Soubirous, (died 1879)
- 21 February – Charles-Marie Widor, organist and composer (died 1937)
- 26 February – Étienne Aymonier, linguist, explorer and archaeologist (died 1929)
- 30 March – Paul Verlaine, poet (died 1896)
- 16 April – Anatole France, author, awarded Nobel Prize for Literature in 1921 (died 1924)
- 3 May – Édouard Drumont, journalist and writer (died 1917)
- 21 May – Henri Rousseau, painter (died 1910)
- 3 August – Marcel-Auguste Dieulafoy, archaeologist (died 1920)
- 22 October – Sarah Bernhardt, actress (died 1923)
- 23 October – Edouard Branly, inventor and physicist (died 1940)
- 8 December – Charles-Émile Reynaud, science teacher, responsible for the first animated films (died 1918)

== Deaths ==
- 1 January – Gustave Maximilien Juste de Croÿ-Solre, Cardinal, Archbishop of Rouen (born 1773)
- 25 January – Jean-Baptiste Drouet, Comte d'Erlon, Marshal of France (born 1765)
- 27 January – Charles Nodier, author (born 1780)
- 8 March – Charles XIV John of Sweden, King of Sweden and Norway, Marshal of France (born 1763)
- 26 May – Jacques Laffitte, banker and politician (born 1767)
- 3 June – Louis-Antoine, Duke of Angoulême, the last Dauphin of France (born 1775)
- 28 July – Joseph Bonaparte, elder brother of Napoleon I, who made him King of Naples and Sicily and later King of Spain (born 1768)
- 14 November – Flora Tristan, socialist writer and activist (born 1803)

=== Full date unknown ===
- Jean-Baptiste Lepère, architect (born 1761)
