= 1890 in France =

- Decades: 1870s; 1880s; 1890s; 1900s; 1910s
- See also: History of France; Timeline of French history; List of years in France

Events from the year 1890 in France.

== Incumbents ==
- President: Marie François Sadi Carnot
- President of the Council of Ministers: Pierre Tirard (until 17 March), Charles de Freycinet (starting 17 March)

== Events ==
- 21 February – First Franco-Dahomean War begins.
- 1 March – Léon Bourgeois succeeds Ernest Constans as Minister of the Interior.
- 4 March – Battle of Cotonou, attack on French positions repulsed.
- 27 July – Death of Vincent van Gogh: van Gogh perhaps paints Tree Roots at Auvers-sur-Oise, then apparently shoots himself, dying two days later.
- 4 October – First Franco-Dahomean War ends in French victory.
- 9 October – The first brief flight of Clément Ader's steam-powered fixed-wing aircraft Ader Éole takes place in Satory. It flies uncontrolled approximately 50 m (160 ft) at a height of 20 cm (7.9 in), the first take-off of a powered airplane solely under its own power.
- Société Nationale des Beaux-Arts is founded. Pierre Puvis de Chavannes is president and co-founder.

== Literature ==
- Anatole France - Thaïs
- Octave Mirbeau - Sébastien Roch
- Georges Ohnet
  - L'Âme de Pierre
  - Serge Panine
- Albert Robida - Le Vingtième siècle. La vie électrique
- Jules Verne - César Cascabel
- Émile Zola - La Bête humaine

== Births ==
=== January to June ===
- 19 January – Élise Rivet, nun and World War II heroine (died 1945)
- 1 February – Germaine Lubin, soprano (died 1979)
- 2 February – Jules Gros, Breton linguist (died 1992)
- 24 March – Robert Schurrer, athlete and Olympic medallist (died 1972)
- 6 April – André-Louis Danjon, astronomer (died 1967)
- 21 April – Eugène Séguy, entomologist (died 1985)
- 29 April – Daisy Fellowes, society figure, writer and heiress (died 1962)
- 29 May – Robert Desoille, psychotherapist (died 1966)
- 12 June – Théophile Alajouanine, neurologist (died 1980)

=== July to December ===
- 4 July – Jacques Carlu, architect and designer (died 1976)
- 27 July – Jacques Forestier, rheumatologist (died 1978)
- 15 August – Jacques Ibert, composer (died 1962)
- 23 August – Marcelle Lalou, Tibetologist (died 1967)
- 25 September – Honoré Barthélemy, cyclist (died 1964)
- 22 November – Charles de Gaulle, general, statesman, President (died 1970)
- 29 November – Maurice Genevoix, author (died 1980)
- 2 December – Jean Médecin, lawyer and politician (died 1965)
- 20 December – Yvonne Arnaud, actress (died 1958 in the United Kingdom)
- 25 December – André Lesauvage, sailor and Olympic gold medallist (died 1971)

=== Full date unknown ===
- Henriette Sauret, feminist, author, pacifist, journalist (died 1976)

== Deaths ==
- 25 January – Jean Gailhac, priest (born 1802)
- 13 July – Auguste Jean François Grenier, doctor and entomologist (born 1814)
- 29 July – Vincent van Gogh Dutch painter (born 1853)
- 18 August – Albert Dubois-Pillet, painter and army officer (born 1846)
- 19 October – Émile Léonard Mathieu, mathematician (born 1835)
- 11 November – Marie-Charles David de Mayréna, adventurer (born 1842)
- 19 December – Eugène Lami, painter and lithographer (born 1800)
