= 1888 in France =

- Decades: 1860s; 1870s; 1880s; 1890s; 1900s
- See also: History of France; Timeline of French history; List of years in France

Events from the year 1888 in France.

== Incumbents ==
- President: Marie François Sadi Carnot
- President of the Council of Ministers: Pierre Tirard (until 3 April), Charles Floquet (until 3 April)

== Events ==
- 21 February – Vincent van Gogh moves to Arles where he will be very productive as a painter.
- 16 March – France annexes the Polynesian kingdom of Raiatea and Taha'a.
- 18 March – France annexes the Polynesian kingdom of Bora Bora.
- 8 April – The town of Mende, Lozère, becomes the first French administrative centre to have electric light installed.
- July–August – Strike of laborers in Paris.
- 8 July – Inauguration of Fontinettes boat lift on the Canal de Neufossé.
- 12 July – Georges Ernest Boulanger and his supporters win seats in the Chamber of Deputies.
- 2 October – Census of foreign residents.
- 14 October – Louis Le Prince films the first motion picture, Roundhay Garden Scene, in Roundhay, Leeds, West Yorkshire, England (followed by Traffic Crossing Leeds Bridge).
- 23 December – Having quarrelled with Gauguin, van Gogh cuts off the lower part of his own left ear, taking it to a brothel, and is removed to the hospital in Arles.
- Jeweller and glass designer René Lalique establishes the Lalique luxury goods business in Paris.

== Literature ==
- Maurice Barrès - Le Culte du moi
- Guy de Maupassant - Pierre et Jean
- Octave Mirbeau - Abbé Jules
- Jules Verne - Deux ans de vacances
- Émile Zola - Le Rêve

== Music ==
- Claude Debussy - Ariettes oubliées
- Gabriel Fauré
  - Pavane
  - 2 Mélodies, Op. 46
  - Caligula
- Emmanuel Chabrier - Joyeuse marche
- Erik Satie - Gymnopédies

== Births ==
=== January to March ===
- 8 January – Pierre Wertheimer, businessman and racehorse owner (died 1965)
- 9 January – Alfred Plé, rower and Olympic medallist (died 1980)
- 20 January – Georges Marrane, politician (died 1976)
- 4 February – Georges Girard, bacteriologist (died 1985)
- 20 February – Georges Bernanos, author (died 1948)
- 1 February – Henri Pequet, pilot, flier of first official airmail flight in 1911 (died 1974)
- 28 February – Eugène Bigot, composer and conductor (died 1965)
- 7 March – Claude Roger-Marx, writer (died 1977)
- 17 March – Henri Gance, weightlifter and Olympic gold medallist (died 1983)
- 22 March – René Massigli, diplomat (died 1988)
- 28 March – Léon Noël, diplomat, politician and historian (died 1987)

=== April to June ===
- 1 April – Lucien Callamand, actor (died 1968)
- 2 April – Roger Ducret, fencer and Olympic gold medallist (died 1962)
- 14 May – Lucien Berland, entomologist and arachnologist (died 1962)
- 15 May – Jean Wahl, philosopher (died 1974)
- 27 May – Louis Durey, composer (died 1979)
- 5 June – Armand Annet, colonial governor (died 1973)

=== July to December ===
- 14 July – Jacques de Lacretelle, novelist (died 1985)
- 26 July – Marcel Jouhandeau, writer (died 1979)
- 31 July
  - Léonce Crenier, Roman Catholic monk and theologian (died 1963)
  - Jean Moreau, politician (died 1972)
- 8 August – César Vezzani, opera singer (died 1951)
- 12 September – Maurice Chevalier, actor and singer (died 1972)
- 16 September – Lucien Lamoureux, politician and Minister (died 1970)
- 24 September – Georges Jean Marie Darrieus, aeronautical engineer (died 1979)
- 30 September – Louis Lecoin, militant pacifist (died 1971)
- 6 October – Roland Garros, aviator and World War I fighter pilot (died 1918)
- 28 October – Stéphane Boudin, interior designer (died 1967)
- 9 November – Jean Monnet, architect of European Unity (died 1979)
- 23 November – Louis Antoine, mathematician (died 1971)
- 3 December – François Dupré, hotelier, art collector and horse breeder (died 1966)
- 16 December – Alphonse Juin, Marshal of France (died 1967)
- 26 December – Marius Canard, orientalist (died 1982)

=== Full date unknown ===
- Georges Bénézé, philosopher (died 1978)
- Camille Le Mercier d'Erm, poet, historian and Breton nationalist (died 1978)

== Deaths ==
- 18 January – Auguste Nicolas, Roman Catholic apologetical writer (born 1807)
- 23 January – Eugène Marin Labiche, dramatist (born 1815)
- 13 February – Jean-Baptiste Lamy, first Archbishop of Santa Fe (born 1814)
- 20 February – François Perrier, general and geodesist (born 1835)
- 22 February – Jean-Delphin Alard, violinist (born 1815)
- 15 March – Léonard Morel-Ladeuil, goldsmith and sculptor (born 1820)
- 16 March – Hippolyte Carnot, statesman (born 1801)
- 29 March – Charles-Valentin Alkan, composer and pianist (born 1813)
- 1 April – Jules Émile Planchon, botanist (born 1823)
- 11 April – Louis-Frédéric Brugère, professor of apologetics and church history (born 1823)
- 14 July – Antoine Étex, sculptor, painter and architect (born 1808)
- 9 August – Charles Cros, poet and inventor (born 1842)
- 16 November – Arsène Darmesteter, philologist (born 1846)

=== Full date unknown ===
- Pierre Bossan, architect (born 1814)
- Émile Sagot, (1805–1888) illustrator and lithographer
