= 1814 in France =

- Decades: 1790s; 1800s; 1810s; 1820s; 1830s
- See also: History of France; Timeline of French history; List of years in France

Events from the year 1814 in France.

== Incumbents ==
- Monarch – Napoleon I (abdicated 6 April), then Louis XVIII

== Events ==
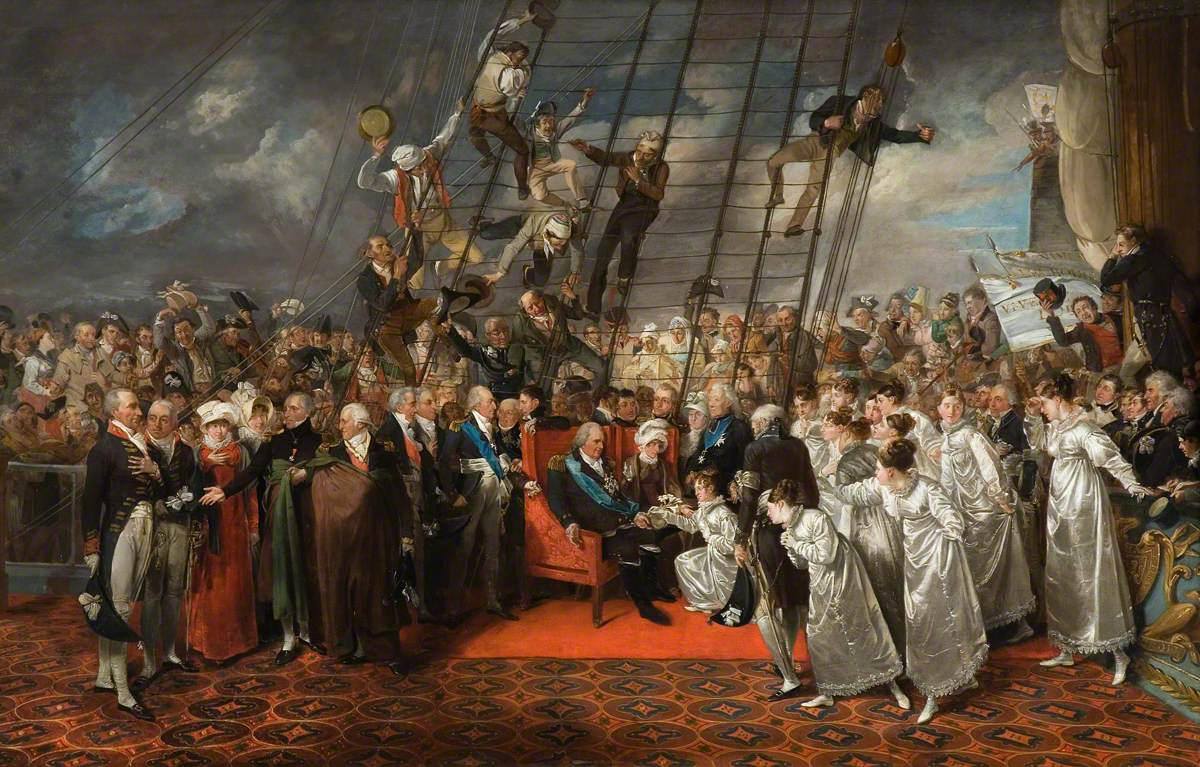
The Arrival of King Louis XVIII of France at Calais by Edward Bird, 1816

- 26 January - First Battle of Saint-Dizier, French victory over Russian forces.
- 29 January - Battle of Brienne, French victory over Prussian and Russian forces.
- 1 February - Battle of La Rothière, Prussian victory over French forces.
- 10 February - Battle of Champaubert, decisive French victory over Prussia/Russia.
- 11 February - Battle of Montmirail, French victory.
- 12 February - Battle of Château-Thierry, French victory against Prussian forces.
- 14 February - Battle of Vauchamps, French victory.
- 17 February - Battle of Mormant, French victory.
- 18 February - Battle of Montereau, French victory over Austrian forces.
- 27 February - Battle of Bar-sur-Aube, Austrian victory.
- 27 February - Peninsular War: Battle of Orthez, Anglo-Portuguese victory over French forces.
- 7 March - Battle of Craonne, French victory.
- 9 March-10 March - Battle of Laon, French defeat.
- 10 March - Napoleon rejects the proposed Treaty of Chaumont.
- 12 March - Louis-Antoine, Duke of Angoulême enters Bordeaux, marking the restoration of the Bourbon dynasty.
- 19 March - Battle of Reims, French victory.
- 20 March-21 March - Battle of Arcis-sur-Aube, Austrian victory over French forces.
- 25 March - Battle of La Fère-Champenoise, Prussian victory.
- 26 March - Second Battle of Saint-Dizier, French victory over Russian forces.
- 30 March - Battle of Montmartre, Austrian/Prussian victory.
- 30 March-31 March - Battle of Paris, decisive victory for Austria/Russia/Prussia.
- 31 March - Paris is occupied by Austrian and Prussian forces.
- 6 April - Napoleon abdicates. Louis XVIII accedes to the throne.
- 10 April - Peninsular War: Battle of Toulouse, indecisive.
- 11 April - Treaty of Fontainebleau, Napoleon is stripped of his powers as ruler of the French Empire.
- 30 May - Treaty of Paris, ends the war between France and the Sixth Coalition and Napoleon is exiled to Elba.

== Births ==
=== January to March ===
- 6 January - Hyacinthe de Valroger, Roman Catholic priest and Oratorian (died 1876)
- 15 January - Pierre-Jules Hetzel, editor and publisher (died 1886)
- 17 January - Hippolyte Lucas, entomologist (died 1899)
- 27 January - Eugène Viollet-le-Duc, architect and theorist (died 1879)
- 30 January - Jules Lequier, philosopher (died 1862)
- 6 February - Auguste Chapdelaine, Christian missionary to China (died 1856)
- 26 February - Charles Joseph Sainte-Claire Deville, geologist and meteorologist (died 1876)
- 28 February - Edmond Frémy, chemist (died 1894)

=== April to June ===
- 19 April - Louis Amédée Achard, novelist (died 1875)
- 1 May - Marie-Alphonse Ratisbonne, Jew who became a Jesuit Catholic priest and missionary (died 1884)
- 14 May - Siméon-François Berneux, Roman Catholic missionary killed in Korea (died 1866)
- 15 May - Antoine Chintreuil, painter (died 1873)
- 21 May - Louis Janmot, painter and poet (died 1892)
- 22 May - Joseph-Louis Lambot, inventor of ferro-cement (died 1887)
- 1 June - François Ponsard, dramatist (died 1867)
- 3 June - Louis Alfred Becquerel, physicist and medical researcher (died 1862)
- 5 June - Pierre Wantzel, mathematician (died 1848)
- 25 June - Gabriel Auguste Daubrée, geologist (died 1896)

=== July to September ===
- 8 September - Charles Étienne Brasseur de Bourbourg, writer, ethnographer, historian and archaeologist (died 1874)
- 16 September - Émile Saisset, philosopher (died 1863)
- 17 September - Pierre Edmond Teisserenc de Bort, writer and politician (died 1892)
- 22 September - Auguste Jean François Grenier, doctor and entomologist (died 1890)
- 23 September - Henri de Castellane, politician and nobleman (died 1847)

=== October to December ===
- 3 October - Hervé Faye, astronomer (died 1902)
- 4 October - Jean-François Millet, painter (died 1875)
- 11 October - Jean-Baptiste Lamy, first Archbishop of Santa Fe (died 1888)
- 13 October - Jules Etienne Joseph Quicherat, historian and archaeologist (died 1882)
- 25 October - Louis, Duke of Nemours, second son of King Louis Philippe I (died 1896)
- 5 November - Alfred de Bougy, poet and author (died 1874)
- 17 November - François-Louis Français, painter (died 1897)
- 30 November - Eugène Rouher, statesman (died 1884)

=== Full date unknown ===
- Louis-Auguste Bisson, photographer (died 1876)
- Pierre Bossan, architect (died 1888)

== Deaths ==
=== January to June ===
- 14 January - Charles Bossut, mathematician (born 1730)
- 21 January - Jacques-Henri Bernardin de Saint-Pierre, writer and botanist (born 1737)
- 30 January - Stephen Rochefontaine, military engineer in the Continental Army in America (born 1755)
- 2 February - Jean-Nicolas Démeunier, author and politician (born 1751)
- 27 February - Julien Louis Geoffroy, literary critic (born 1743)
- 13 March - Louis François II de Bourbon, prince de Conti, aristocrat (born 1734)
- 26 March - Joseph-Ignace Guillotin, physician who proposed the use of a mechanical device to carry out death penalties (born 1738)
- 29 March - Claude Michel, sculptor (born 1738)
- 31 March - Pierre Sonnerat, naturalist and explorer (born 1748)
- 25 April - Louis-Sébastien Mercier, dramatist and writer (born 1740)
- 29 May - Joséphine de Beauharnais, first wife of Napoleon and thus the first Empress of the French (born 1763)
- 28 June - Edmond Louis Alexis Dubois-Crancé, soldier and politician (born 1747)

=== July to December ===
- 5 July - Jean Baptiste Le Sueur Fontaine, actor and theatre director (born 1745)
- 7 September - Pierre Victor, baron Malouet, publicist and politician (born 1740)
- 13 September - Louis-François Bertin, journalist (born 1766)
- 17 September - Jacques Bernard d'Anselme, General (born 1740)
- 1 October - Guillaume-Antoine Olivier, entomologist (born 1756)
- 30 November - Jean-Michel Moreau le Jeune, draughtsman, illustrator and engraver (born 1741)
- 2 December - Marquis de Sade, aristocrat, revolutionary and writer of philosophy-laden and often violent pornography (born 1740)
- 11 December - Marie-Louise O'Murphy, child-courtesan, one of the several mistresses of King Louis XV (born 1737)

=== Full date unknown ===
- Abbé Aubert, dramatist, poet and journalist (born 1731)
- Pierre Patte, architect (born 1723)
- Jean-François Pierre Peyron, painter (born 1744)
- Jean Baptiste Louis George Seroux D'Agincourt, archaeologist and historian (born 1730)
