= 1885 in France =

- Decades: 1860s; 1870s; 1880s; 1890s; 1900s
- See also: History of France; Timeline of French history; List of years in France

Events from the year 1885 in France.

== Incumbents ==
- President: Jules Grévy
- President of the Council of Ministers: Jules Ferry (until 6 April), Henri Brisson (starting 6 April)

== Events ==
- 28 February – Siege of Tuyên Quang ends, as French Foreign Legion is relieved after being besieged by forces of the Empire of China.
- 23 March – Battle of Bang Bo in Vietnam, significant battle of the Sino-French War and French defeat, leading to the Tonkin Affair, a major political crisis.
- 28 March – French abandon Lạng Sơn.
- 9 June – Sino-French War ends as treaty is signed.
- 14 October – Legislative Election held.
- 18 October – Legislative Election held.
- November – First train crosses Garabit viaduct in the Massif Central.

== Literature ==
- Guy de Maupassant - Bel-Ami
- Jules Verne - Mathias Sandorf
- Émile Zola - Germinal

== Births ==
=== January to June ===
- 8 January – Charles Basle, American auto racer (died 1962)
- 22 January – Eugène Christophe, cyclist (died 1970)
- 28 January – Maurice Brocco, cyclist (died 1965)
- 1 February – Camille Chautemps, politician, three times Prime Minister of France (died 1963)
- 3 February – Camille Arambourg, paleontologist (died 1970)
- 6 March – Yvonne Gall, operatic soprano (died 1972)
- 16 March – Fernand Baldet, astronomer (died 1964)
- 23 March – Yves le Prieur, naval officer and inventor (died 1963)
- 6 April – Jules Goux, motor racing driver (died 1965)
- 5 June – Georges Mandel, politician and Resistance leader (executed 1944)
- 15 June – Roland Dorgelès, novelist (died 1973)
- 27 June – Pierre Montet, Egyptologist (died 1966)

=== July to December ===
- 5 July – André Lhote, sculptor and painter (died 1962)
- 26 July – André Maurois, author and man of letters (died 1967)
- 26 August – Jules Romains, poet and writer (died 1972)
- 31 August – Lucien Chopard, entomologist (died 1971)
- 15 September – Marcel Allain, writer (died 1970)
- 11 October – François Mauriac, author, winner of the Nobel Prize in Literature (died 1970)
- 25 October – Xavier Lesage, horse rider, Olympic gold medallist (died 1969)
- 10 November – Lou Albert-Lasard, painter (died 1969)
- 23 December – Pierre Brissaud, illustrator, painter and engraver (died 1964)

== Deaths ==
- 10 January – Amable Tastu, woman of letters (born 1795).
- 16 January – Edmond François Valentin About, novelist, publicist and journalist (born 1828)
- 18 April – Marc Monnier, writer (born 1827)
- 3 May – Paul-Quentin Desains, physicist (born 1817)
- 18 May – Alphonse-Marie-Adolphe de Neuville, painter (born 1835)
- 22 May – Victor Hugo, poet, playwright, novelist and statesman (born 1802)
- June – Amédée Courbet, admiral (born 1828)
- 29 July – Henri Milne-Edwards, zoologist (born 1800)
- 17 December – Augustus Thébaud, Jesuit educator and publicist (born 1807)
- 24 December – Louis Prosper Gachard, man of letters (born 1800)
