= 1846 in France =

- Decades: 1820s; 1830s; 1840s; 1850s; 1860s
- See also: History of France; Timeline of French history; List of years in France

Events from the year 1846 in France.

== Incumbents ==
- Monarch – Louis Philippe I

== Events ==
- 9 January – Barentin Viaduct on the Paris–Le Havre railway collapses soon after its completion by English engineers.
- 1 August – Legislative election held for the seventh legislature of the July Monarchy.
- 19 September – Our Lady of La Salette apparition.
- Dubonnet first sold.

== Births ==
- 1 January - Léon Denis, spiritist philosopher and researcher (died 1927)
- 4 April - Comte de Lautréamont, poet (died 1870)
- 8 May - Émile Gallé, artist (died 1904)
- 21 May - Luc-Olivier Merson, painter and illustrator (died 1920)
- 11 July - Léon Bloy, novelist, essayist, pamphleteer and poet (died 1917)
- 8 August - Élisabeth Renaud, teacher, socialist activist, and feminist (died 1932)
- 21 August - Étienne Bazeries, military cryptanalyst (died 1931)
- 2 September - Paul Déroulède, author and politician (died 1914)
- 24 October - Denis Jean Achille Luchaire, historian (died 1908)
- 28 October - Albert Dubois-Pillet, painter and army officer (died 1890)
- 28 October - Auguste Escoffier, chef, restaurateur and culinary writer (died 1935)
- 30 October - Victor, 5th duc de Broglie, aristocrat (died 1906)

=== Full date unknown ===
- Arsène Darmesteter, philologist (died 1888)

== Deaths ==
- 17 June - Jean-Gaspard Deburau, actor and mime (born 1796)
- 25 July - Louis Bonaparte, brother of Napoleon I of France (born 1778)
- 16 August - Sylvain Charles Valée, Marshal of France (born 1773)
- 22 December - Jean Baptiste Bory de Saint-Vincent, naturalist (born 1778)

=== Full date unknown ===
- Thérèse Albert, actress (b. c. 1805)
- Jacques-Antoine-Adrien Delort, general and deputy (born 1773)
- Ambroise-Louis-Marie d'Hozier, last of the juges d'armes of France (born 1764)
- Joseph Balthasar, Comte Siméon, politician (born 1781)
