= 1847 in France =

- Decades: 1820s; 1830s; 1840s; 1850s; 1860s
- See also: History of France; Timeline of French history; List of years in France

Events from the year 1847 in France.

== Incumbents ==
- Monarch – Louis Philippe I

== Events ==
- 15 April - Bombardment of Tourane: French vessels dispatched by Admiral Cécille bombard Tourane (Da Nang in Vietnam) in response to the persecution of Roman Catholic missionaries.
- 21 December - Emir Abdelkader surrenders in Algeria and is imprisoned in France.
- Jeweler Cartier established in Paris.

== Births ==
- 15 January - Camille Doncieux, first wife of Claude Monet (died 1879)
- 23 March - Victor Besaucèle, ornithologist (d. 1924)
- 25 March - Fernand Lataste, zoologist (died 1934)
- 31 May - Jules Bourgeois, entomologist (died 1911)
- 16 June - Paul Alexis, novelist, dramatist and journalist (died 1901)
- 29 June - Charles Gide, economist and historian of economic thought (died 1932)
- 1 July - Eugène Boullet, entomologist (died 1923)
- 14 July - Noël Ballay, explorer, colonial administrator and poet (died 1902)
- 22 July - Jean-Baptiste Bienvenu-Martin, Socialist leader and Minister (died 1943)
- 4 October - Louis Henri Boussenard, author of adventure novels (died 1911)
- 8 November - Jean Casimir-Périer, politician, fifth president of the French Third Republic (died 1907)
- 15 December - Gaston Floquet, mathematician (died 1920)
- 17 December - Michel-Joseph Maunoury, military leader (died 1923)
- 18 December - Augusta Holmès, composer (died 1903)

== Deaths ==
=== January to June ===
- 3 February - Marie Duplessis, courtesan (born 1824)
- 4 February - Henri Dutrochet, physician, botanist and physiologist (born 1776)
- 15 February - Germinal Pierre Dandelin, mathematician, soldier, and professor of engineering (born 1794)
- 24 February - Alexandre Guiraud, poet and novelist (born 1788)
- 2 March - Jules, prince de Polignac, statesman (born 1780)
- 17 March - Jean Ignace Isidore Gérard, caricaturist (born 1803)
- 20 March - Mademoiselle Mars, actress (born 1779)
- 29 May - Emmanuel de Grouchy, Marquis de Grouchy, Marshal of France, (born 1766)
- 12 June - Pierre-Simon Ballanche, writer and philosopher (born 1776)

=== July to December ===
- 13 September - Nicolas Oudinot, Marshal of France (born 1767)
- 7 October - Alexandre Brongniart, chemist, mineralogist, and zoologist (born 1770)
- 16 October - Henri de Castellane, politician and nobleman (born 1814)
- 31 December - Princess Adélaïde of Orléans, adviser to brother Louis Philippe, King of the French (born 1777)

=== Full date unknown ===
- Benjamin Nicolas Marie Appert, philanthropist (born 1797)
