= 1884 in France =

- Decades: 1860s; 1870s; 1880s; 1890s; 1900s
- See also: History of France; Timeline of French history; List of years in France

Events from the year 1884 in France.

== Incumbents ==
- President: Jules Grévy
- President of the Council of Ministers: Jules Ferry

== Events ==
- 7 March – Eugène Poubelle introduces the dustbin to Paris.
- June – At Bắc Lệ, Chinese forces attack a French column sent to occupy Tonkin in accordance with earlier treaties, starting the Sino-French War.
- 6 June – Treaty of Hué is signed between representatives of Vietnam and the French Empire.
- 29 July – Société des Artistes Indépendants is founded in Paris.
- 23 August – Battle of Fuzhou: Admiral Amédée Courbet's Far East Squadron virtually destroys China's Fujian Fleet.
- 1 October – French begin occupation of Keelung (Jilong).
- 23 November – Siege of Tuyên Quang begins in Indochina: The French Foreign Legion is besieged by forces of the Empire of China.

== Literature ==
- Jules Barbey d'Aurevilly - Ce qui ne meurt pas
- Alphonse Daudet - Sappho
- Joris-Karl Huysmans - À rebours
- Xavier de Montépin - La porteuse de pain
- Rachilde - Monsieur Vénus
- Jules Verne
  - L'Archipel en feu
  - L'Étoile du sud
- Émile Zola - La joie de vivre

== Births ==
=== January to June ===
- 5 January – Arnaud Denjoy, mathematician (died 1974)
- 7 February – Achille Liénart, Cardinal (died 1973)
- 24 March – Eugène-Gabriel-Gervais-Laurent Tisserant, Cardinal (died 1972)
- 26 March – Paul Legentilhomme, military officer (died 1975)
- 31 March – Henri Queuille, Radical-Socialist politician and Prime Minister of France (died 1970)
- 5 May – Jean Decoux, Governor-General of French Indochina (died 1963)
- 13 June – Étienne Gilson, Thomistic philosopher and historian of philosophy (died 1978)
- 18 June – Édouard Daladier, Radical-Socialist politician and Prime Minister of France (died 1970)
- 19 June – Georges Ribemont-Dessaignes, writer and artist (died 1974)
- 27 June – Gaston Bachelard, philosopher (died 1962)
- 30 June – Georges Duhamel, author (died 1966)

=== July to December ===
- 4 July – Pauline Carton, actress (died 1974)
- 7 July – André Dunoyer de Segonzac, painter and graphic artist (died 1974)
- 10 July – Pierre Larquey, actor (died 1962)
- 12 July – Edgar Stehli, French-born American actor (died 1973)
- 3 August – Georges Boillot, motor racing driver and World War I fighter pilot (died 1916)
- 25 August – Léon Poirier, film director, screenwriter and film producer (died 1968)
- 27 August – Vincent Auriol, politician, President of France (died 1966)
- 4 September – Henri Meslot, athlete (died 1973)
- 24 September – Gustave Garrigou, cyclist, 1911 Tour de France winner (died 1963)
- 25 September – Rita Jolivet, American-born actress (died 1971)
- 4 October – Félix Gouin, politician (died 1977)
- 27 October – André Le Troquer, politician and lawyer (died 1963)
- 2 December – Jean Paulhan, writer, literary critic and publisher (died 1968)

=== Full date unknown ===
- Jacques Maroger, painter (died 1962)

== Deaths ==
- 3 February – Eugène Rouher, statesman (born 1814)
- 4 April – Adolphe Dugléré, chef (born 1805)
- 10 April – Jean-Baptiste Dumas, chemist (born 1800)
- 6 May
  - Judah P. Benjamin, American-born Jewish United States Senator from Louisiana from 1853 to 1861 (born 1811)
  - Marie-Alphonse Ratisbonne, Jew who became a Jesuit Catholic priest and missionary (born 1814)
- 10 September – Jean-Augustin Barral, agronomist (born 1819)
- 13 December – Eugène Pelletan, writer, journalist and politician (born 1813)
