= 1886 in France =

- Decades: 1860s; 1870s; 1880s; 1890s; 1900s
- See also: History of France; Timeline of French history; List of years in France

Events from the year 1886 in France.

== Incumbents ==
- President: Jules Grévy
- President of the Council of Ministers:
  - until 7 January: Henri Brisson
  - 7 January-16 December: Charles de Freycinet
  - starting 16 December: René Goblet

== Events ==
- 15 May – Portugal and France agree to regulate the borders of their colonies in Guinea.
- 30 November – Folies Bergère in Paris stages its first revue.
- Georges Seurat finishes painting A Sunday Afternoon on the Island of La Grande Jatte.

== Literature ==
- Auguste Villiers de l'Isle-Adam - L'Ève future
- Pierre Loti - Pêcheur d'Islande
- Jules Mary - Roger la Honte
- Octave Mirbeau - Le Calvaire
- Jules Verne
  - Un Billet de loterie
  - Robur-le-Conquérant
- Émile Zola - L'Œuvre

== Births ==
=== January to June ===
- 28 January – Georges Painvin, cryptanalyst (died 1980)
- 5 March – Léon Mathot, actor and film director (died 1968)
- 7 March – Jacques Majorelle, painter (died 1962)
- 7 March – René Thomas, motor racing driver (died 1975)
- 28 March – Gustave Mesny, army general (died 1945)
- 29 March – Paul Amiot, actor (died 1979)
- 15 April – Amédée Ozenfant, cubist painter (died 1966)
- 19 April – Hermine David, painter (died 1970)
- 25 April – Marie Brémont, supercentenarian, the oldest recognized person in the world from November 2000 until her death (died 2001)
- 29 April – Count Renaud de la Frégeolière, author and first president of the Fédération Internationale de Bobsleigh et de Tobogganing (died 1981)
- 3 May – Marcel Dupré, organist, pianist and composer (died 1971)
- 24 May – Paul Paray, conductor, organist and composer (died 1979)

=== July to December ===
- 16 July – Pierre Benoit, novelist (died 1962)
- 3 August – Henri Debain, actor (died 1983)
- 8 September – Marguerite Jeanne Carpentier, painter and sculptor (died 1965)
- 15 September – Paul Lévy, mathematician (died 1971)
- 16 September – Jean Arp, sculptor, painter, poet and abstract artist (died 1966)
- 30 September – Gaston Ramon, veterinarian and biologist (died 1963)
- 3 October – Alain-Fournier, author and soldier (died 1914)
- 4 October – Laurent Eynac, politician and Minister (died 1970)
- 6 November – André Marty, leading figure in the French Communist Party (died 1956)
- 15 November – René Guénon, orientalist and philosopher (died 1951)
- 30 December – Henri Chapron, automobile coachbuilder (died 1978)

=== Full date unknown ===
- Marie-Gabriel Tissot, Abbot of Quarr (died 1983)

== Deaths ==
- 23 January – Jean Baptiste Prosper Bressant, actor (born 1815)
- 27 April – Eugène Isabey, painter, draftsman, and printmaker (born 1803)
- 17 March – Pierre-Jules Hetzel, editor and publisher (born 1814)
- 23 May – Pierre Édouard Frère, painter (born 1819)
- 12 July – Ferdinand Berthier, deaf educator, intellectual and political organiser (born 1803)
- 14 August – Edmond Laguerre, mathematician (born 1834)
- 8 September – Maurice Jean Auguste Girard, entomologist (born 1822)
- 16 September – Louis, duc de Decazes, statesman (born 1819)
- 26 September – Hippolyte Castille, writer (born 1820)
- 14 November – Alexandre-Emile Béguyer de Chancourtois, geologist and mineralogist (born 1820)
