= 1887 in France =

- Decades: 1860s; 1870s; 1880s; 1890s; 1900s
- See also: History of France; Timeline of French history; List of years in France

Events from the year 1887 in France.

== Incumbents ==
- President: Jules Grévy (until 12 December), Marie François Sadi Carnot (starting 12 December)
- President of the Council of Ministers:
  - until 30 May: René Goblet
  - 30 May-12 December: Maurice Rouvier
  - starting 12 December: Pierre Tirard

== Events ==
- 28 January – Construction of foundation of the Eiffel Tower starts in Paris. On 14 February, a letter of protest against its design signed by members of the artistic community is published on the front page of Les Temps newspaper. On 1 July, work on the iron superstructure begins.
- 11 January – Louis Pasteur's anti-rabies treatment is defended in the French Academy of Medicine by Dr. Joseph Grancher.
- 23 February – The French Riviera is hit by a powerful earthquake originating in Liguria, killing around 2,000 along the coast of the Mediterranean Sea.
- 24 February – The first international telephone line in Europe is opened to the public between Brussels and Paris.
- 21–28 April – The Schnaebele incident nearly leads to war between France and Germany.
- The Lebel Model 1886 rifle is first issued to the French army, the first military firearm to use smokeless powder ammunition.

== Literature ==
- Léon Bloy - Le Désespéré
- Édouard Dujardin - Les lauriers sont coupés
- Joris-Karl Huysmans - En rade
- Pierre Loti - Madame Chrysanthème
- Guy de Maupassant - Le Rosier de Madame Husson
- Jules Verne - Le Chemin de France / Nord contre Sud
- Émile Zola - La Terre

== Births ==
=== January to June ===
- 17 January – Marcel Godivier, cyclist (died 1963)
- 18 March – Alfred Vaucher, theologian, church historian and bibliographer (died 1993)
- 16 April – Paul Marie André Richaud, Cardinal (died 1968)
- 24 May - Jean de La Varende, Writer (died 1959)
- 31 May – Saint-John Perse, poet and diplomat, awarded the Nobel Prize for Literature in 1960 (died 1975)
- 13 June – André François-Poncet, politician and diplomat (died 1978)

=== July to December ===
- 2 July – Marcel Tabuteau, oboist (died 1966)
- 28 July – Marcel Duchamp, artist (died 1968)
- 16 September – Nadia Boulanger, composer and conductor (died 1979)
- 30 September – Joseph de Goislard de Monsabert, General (died 1981)
- 5 October – René Cassin, jurist and judge, received the Nobel Peace Prize in 1968 (died 1976)
- 11 October – Pierre Jean Jouve, writer, novelist and poet (died 1976)
- 13 November – Jean de Limur, film director (died 1976)
- 31 December – Gaston Modot, actor (died 1970)

== Deaths ==
- 2 August – Joseph-Louis Lambot, inventor of ferro-cement (born 1814)
- 14 August – Jules Pasdeloup, conductor (born 1819)
- 20 August – Jules Laforgue, poet (born 1860)
- 21 October – Bernard Jauréguiberry, Admiral and statesman (born 1815)

=== Full date unknown ===
- Jules Desnoyers, geologist and archaeologist (born 1800)
- Honoré Jacquinot, surgeon and zoologist (born 1815)
