= 1762 in France =

- Decades: 1740s; 1750s; 1760s; 1770s; 1780s
- See also: History of France; Timeline of French history; List of years in France

Events from the year 1762 in France.

== Incumbents ==
- Monarch – Louis XV

== Events ==
- 5 January–12 February – Invasion of Martinique by British forces
- 10 March – Jean Calas, a 68 year old merchant convicted unjustly of murdering his son because of religious differences, is brutally executed on orders of the Parlement of Toulouse: after his legs and hips are broken and crushed, he is tortured on the breaking wheel (la roue) to remain "in pain and repentance for his crimes and misdeeds, for as long as it shall please God to keep him alive"
- 5 April – France issues a new ordinance requiring all black and mixed-race Frenchmen to register their identity information with the offices of the Admiralty Court, upon the advice of Guillaume Poncet de la Grave, adviser to Louis XV, requiring both free and enslaved blacks and mulattoes to list data including their age, surname, purpose for which they are residing in France, whether they have been baptized as Christians, where they emigrated from in Africa and the name of the ship upon which they arrived (the declaration of 1738 required slave-owners to register their slaves, but had placed no such requirement on free people)
- 20 June – In Paris, the Comédie-Italienne, having merged with the Opéra-Comique, performs at the Hôtel de Bourgogne
- 13 November – Treaty of Fontainebleau: Louis XV secretly cedes Louisiana (New France) to Charles III of Spain
- Courses begin at the first veterinary school, established by Claude Bourgelat in Lyon
- The Sorbonne library is founded
- The Académie française produces a new edition of its dictionary of the French language, the fourth to be published
- Louis XV orders construction of the Petit Trianon in the park of the Palace of Versailles to the design of Ange-Jacques Gabriel for his mistress Madame de Pompadour
- An equestrian statue of Louis XV in the Place de la Concorde, Paris, is completed, Edmé Bouchardon's design being finished by Jean-Baptiste Pigalle; it will be destroyed during the French Revolution.
- Tassinari et Chatel, Lyon silk weavers, established

== Births ==
- 29 April – Jean-Baptiste Jourdan, marshal (died 1833)
- 20 September – Pierre-François-Léonard Fontaine, neoclassical architect, interior decorator and designer (died 1853)
- 9 October – Charles de Suremain, military officer and diplomat in Swedish service (died 1835)
- 30 October – André Chénier, Ottoman-born poet (guillotined 1794)
- 20 November – Pierre André Latreille, zoologist (died 1833)

=== Full date unknown ===
- Pierre-Michel Alix, engraver (died 1817)
- Philippe Vannier, naval officer (died 1842)

== Deaths ==
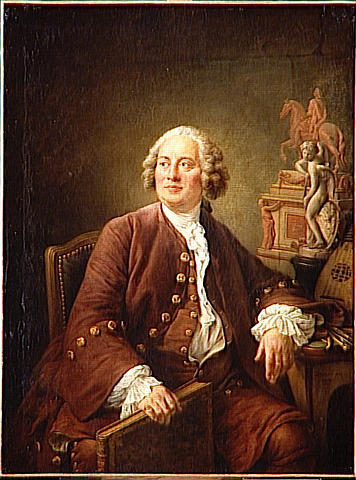
Edmé Bouchardon

- 11 January – Louis-François Roubiliac, sculptor (born 1702)
- 24 January – Bernard Baron, engraver, in London (born 1696?)
- 12 February – Laurent Belissen, composer (born 1693)
- 21 March – Nicolas-Louis de Lacaille, astronomer (born 1713)
- 29 May – Edmé Bouchardon, sculptor (born 1698)
- 17 June – Prosper Jolyot de Crébillon, poet and tragedian (born 1674)
- 28 August – Augustin de Boschenry de Drucour, military officer (baptized 1703)
- 30 September – Jacques Daviel, ophthalmologist (born 1696)

=== Full date unknown ===
- Hyacinthe Gaëtan de Lannion, politician (born 1719)
- Jean Barbault, painter and printmaker, in Rome (born 1718)
