= Ferdinand de Géramb =

Military officer and monk

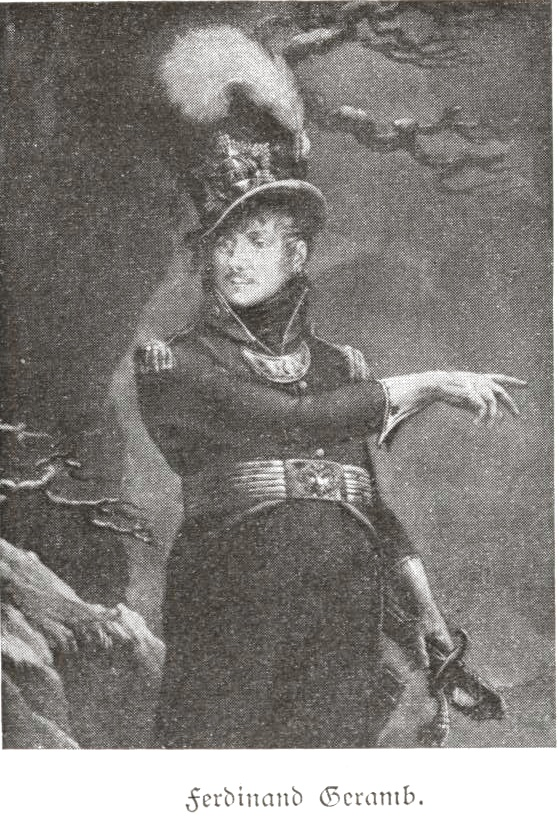
Ferdinand von Geramb, military commander

Geramb as Brother Maria-Joseph

Ferdinand de Géramb (14 January 1772 – 15 March 1848) was an Ungro-French supposed nobleman, military officer, courtier, adventurer and later Trappist monk and religious author. He served as lieutenant-general in the Austrian army, chamberlain to the Austrian Emperor and titular abbot and Bursar-general of the Trappist order.

== Life ==
He is said to have been born in Lyon, allegedly the scion of an ancient family from Hungary and an aristocratic French mother. Some historians have questioned both the place and date of his birth, and also his noble descent. He took an active part in the struggles of the monarchies of Europe against the French Revolution, and rose to the rank of lieutenant-general in Austria.

In 1808 he fell into the hands of Napoleon's forces, who imprisoned him in the Château de Vincennes until 1814, when the allied powers entered Paris. After bidding farewell to the Russian Tsar and the Emperor of Austria, he resolved to leave the world. It was at this time that he met Eugène de Laprade, Abbot of Notre Dame du Port du Salut, near Laval (France), whom he begged for admittance into the community as a novice. A widower with four surviving children, he left them in the care of his brother, a general, prior to entering the religious life. He made his religious profession in 1817, taking the name Brother Marie-Joseph. In the abbey, he was given the role of community barber, but this was not a success. Later, as architect of the chapel roof, he saw his construction collapse.

He was sent, in 1827, to Oelenberg Abbey in Alsace. During the Revolution of 1830 de Géramb faced off a troop of insurgents who had come to pillage the monastery. Although the religious had been dispersed, the abbey was spared pillage. It was at this time that de Géramb made his pilgrimage to Jerusalem.

On his return in 1833 from the Holy Land, he went to Rome, where he was appointed procurator-general of the Trappist federation. Having gained the esteem of Pope Gregory XVI, despite not being ordained a priest, he was named Titular Abbot by the Pope, allowed to bear the insignia of office, including the ring and pectoral cross, a privilege without precedent. In his monk's cowl the great nobleman was occasionally seen distributing alms to the poor, from the considerable sums of money he received from his family to "defray his expenses". He died in Rome, aged 76.

== Works ==
Brother de Géramb was the author of many works, the principal including:

- "Letters to Eugene on the Eucharist"
- "Eternity is approaching"
- "Pilgrimage to Jerusalem"
- "A Journey from La Trappe to Rome"

Other writings have an ascetical character and were often reprinted and translated.

== Family ==
In 1796, Baron de Géramb married his cousin Theresa de Adda, who died, in 1808, in Palermo. Six children were born to them, of whom two died in infancy. On his entry into the religious life, he put the surviving children into the care of his brother, Léopold de Géramb, having placed them under the protection of the Russian Tsar and the Emperor of Austria.
