= Jules Gros =

Breton linguist (1890-1992)

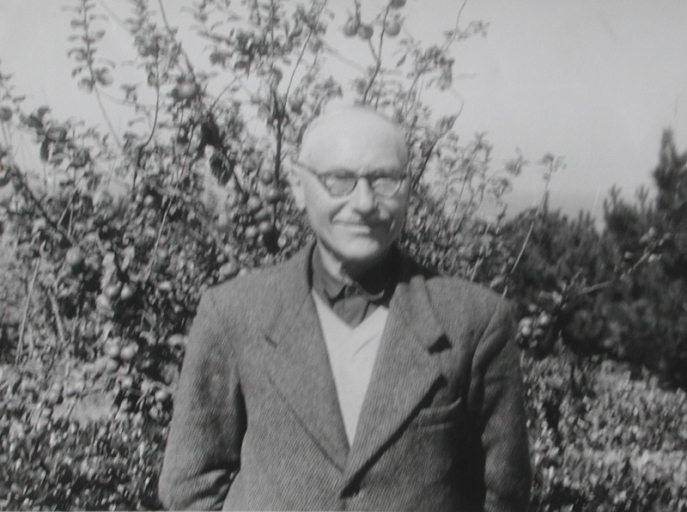
Jules Gros.

Jules Marcel Gros (French pronunciation: [ʒyl maʁsɛl ɡʁo]; 2 February 1890 – 25 December 1992) was a Breton linguist specializing in the Breton language. He was born in Paris.

Gros' studies began very early in the twentieth century, from his grandmother and other people in his village who were still unilingual Breton speakers. Gros authored Stylistique Trégorroise and various dictionaries of Breton. His books were used by a generation of students, and continue to be important as reference works cataloguing the speech patterns of the Breton language.

Gros died on 25 December 1992 in Trédrez-Locquémeau.

== See also ==
- Celtic languages
- Brittonic languages
