= Alfred de Bougy =

French poet (1814–1871)

- Born: 5 November 1814; Grenoble, France
- Died: 4 September 1871 (aged 56); Thonon-les-Bains, France
- Occupations: Poet, writer
- Writing career
- Pen name: Ethelred Bergeville
- Language: French

Alfred James Louis Joseph de Bougy (5 November 1814 — 4 September 1871), French poet and author, was born in Grenoble. He died in Thonon-les-Bains. He also wrote under the pen-name of Ethelred Bergeville.

== Works ==
- Histoire de la Bibliothèque Sainte-Geneviève, Paris: Comon, 1847
- Les Bourla-Papei ou brûleurs de papiers, 1988
- Un million de rimes gauloises: Fleur de la poésie drolatique et badine depuis le XVe siècle recueillie, Paris: Adolphe Delahays, 1858
