= 1970 French cantonal elections =

Cantonale elections to renew canton general councillors were held in France on 8 and 15 March 1970.

== Electoral system ==
The cantonales elections use the same system as the regional or legislative elections. There is a 10% threshold (10% of registered voters) needed to proceed to the second round.

== National results ==
Runoff results missing

| Party/Alliance | % (first round) | Seats |
|---|---|---|
| PCF | 23.8% | 144 |
| Miscellaneous Right | 17.8% | 389 |
| UDR | 15.6% | 206 |
| SFIO | 14.8% | 263 |
| Miscellaneous Left | 10.5% | 292 |
| CD | 9.1% | 183 |
| RI | 5.2% | 110 |
| Far-Left | 3.1% | 22 |
