= Francisque Bouillier =

French philosopher (1813–1899)

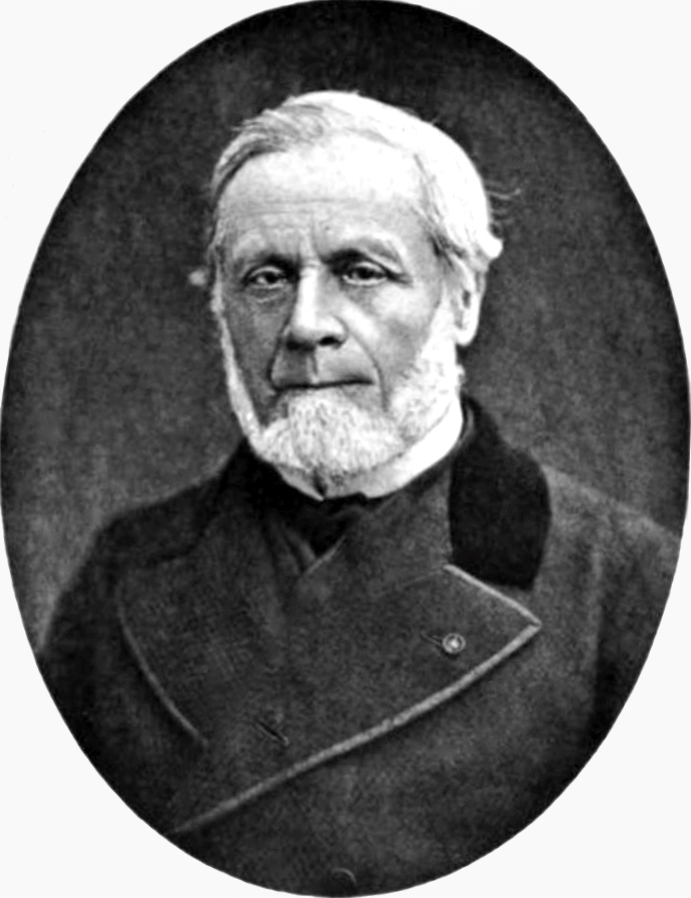
Francisque Bouillier.

Francisque Bouillier (12 July 1813 – 25 September 1899) was a French philosopher, born in Lyons. He studied at the École Normale Supérieure, Paris, and in 1839 was appointed professor of philosophy at the University of Lyons. From 1849 to 1864 he was dean of the faculty at Lyons and from 1867 to 1870 director of the École Normale Supérieure. His works include:

- Histoire et critique de la révolution cartésienne (1842)
- Théorie de la raison impersonnelle (1844)
- Du principe vital et de l'âme pensante (1862)
- Du plaisir et de la douleur (1865)
- La vraie conscience (1882)
- Souvenirs d'un vieil universitaire (1897)
