= Pierre Hyacinthe Azaïs =

French philosopher (1766–1845)

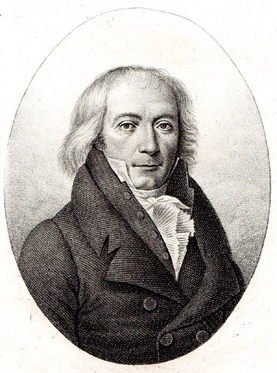
Pierre Hyacinthe Azaïs

Pierre Hyacinthe Azaïs (1 March 1766 – 22 January 1845) was a French philosopher.

== Life ==
Azaïs was born at Sorèze and died in Paris. He spent his early years as a teacher and a village organist. At the outbreak of the French Revolution he viewed it with favor, but was soon disgusted at the violence of its methods. A critical pamphlet drew upon him the hatred of the revolutionists, and it was not until 1806 that he was able to settle in Paris. In 1809 he published his great work, Des Compensations dans les destines humaines (5th ed. 1846), which pleased Napoleon so much that he made its author professor at St Cyr. In 1811 he became inspector of the public library at Avignon, and from 1812 to 1815 he held the same position at Nancy. The Restoration government at first suspected him as a Bonapartist, but at length granted him a pension. From that time he occupied himself in lecturing and the publication of philosophical works.

In the Compensations he sought to prove that, on the whole, happiness and misery are equally balanced, and therefore that men should accept the government which is given them rather than risk the horrors of revolution. Le principe de l'inégalité naturelle et essentielle dans les destinées humaines conduit inevitablement au fanatisme revolutionnaire ou au fanatisme religieux.; The principles of compensation and equilibrium are found also in the physical universe, the product of matter and force, whose cause is God. Force, naturally expansive and operating on the homogeneous atoms which constitute elemental matter, is subject to the law of equilibrium, or equivalence of action and reaction. The development of phenomena under this law may be divided into three stages: the physical, the physiological, the intellectual and moral. The immaterial in man is the expansive force inherent in him. Moral and political phenomena are the result of the opposing forces of progress and preservation, and their perfection lies in the fulfilment of the law of equilibrium or universal harmony. This may be achieved in seven thousand years, when man will vanish from the world. In an additional five thousand, a similar equilibrium will obtain in the physical sphere, which will then itself pass away.

In addition to his philosophical work, Azaïs studied music under his father, Pierre Hyacinthe Azaïs (1743-1796), professor of music at Sorèze and Toulouse, and composer of sacred music in the style of Gossec. He wrote for the Revue musicale a series of articles entitled Acoustique fondamentale (1831), containing an ingenious, but now exploded, theory of the vibration of the air.

The son's other works are: Système universel (8 vols., 1812); Du Sort de l'homme (3 vols., 1820); Cours de philosophie (8 vols., 1824), reproduced as Explication universelle (3 vols., 1826–1828); Jeunesse, maturité, religion, philosophie (1837); De la phrénologie, du magnétisme, et de la folie (1843).
