= 1764 in France =

- Decades: 1740s; 1750s; 1760s; 1770s; 1780s
- See also: History of France; Timeline of French history; List of years in France

Events from the year 1764 in France.

== Incumbents ==
- Monarch: Louis XV

== Events ==
- 15 March – The day after his return to Paris from a nine-year mission, French explorer and scholar Anquetil Du Perron presents a complete copy of the Zoroastrian sacred text, the Zend Avesta, to the Bibliothèque Royale.
- 21 April – Residents of French Louisiana are informed for the first time that they will come under Spanish rule (from 1769) as the result of a secret agreement of 13 November 1762, whereby France has ceded all of its North American territory west of the Mississippi River.
- The government withdraws wartime taxes.
- Beast of Gévaudan first appears.
- Carthusian monks at Grande Chartreuse perfect a commercial recipe for Chartreuse (liqueur).

== Births ==
- 11 February – Joseph Chénier, poet (d. 1811)
- 13 April – Laurent de Gouvion Saint-Cyr, marshal (d. 1830)
- 26 April – Claude-Laurent Bourgeois de Jessaint, aristocrat and civic administrator (d. 1853)
- 3 May – Princess Élisabeth of France, sister of Louis XVI (executed 1794)
- 13 August – Louis Baraguey d'Hilliers, general (d. 1813)
- 7 December
  - Pierre Prévost, panorama painter (d. 1823)
  - Claude-Victor Perrin, Duc de Belluno, Marshal of France (d. 1841)

=== Full date unknown ===
- Sophie de Condorcet, political hostess and feminist (d. 1822)

== Deaths ==
- 15 April – Madame de Pompadour, mistress of Louis XV (b. 1721)
- 11 September – Countess Dash, writer (born 1704)
- 12 September – Jean-Philippe Rameau, composer (b. 1683)
- 22 October – Jean-Marie Leclair, composer and violinist (murdered) (b. 1697)
- 23 October – Emmanuel-Auguste de Cahideuc, Comte Dubois de la Motte, naval officer (b. 1683)
