= Jean Baptiste, baron Franceschi =

French general (1766–1813)

- Born: 5 December 1766; Bastia
- Died: 13 March 1813 (aged 46); Danzig
- Military career
- Conflicts: French Revolutionary Wars; Siege of San Fiorenzo; Battle of Marengo; Napoleonic Wars; Battle of Borodino; Siege of Danzig

Jean Baptiste, baron Franceschi (French pronunciation: [ʒɑ̃ batist fʁɑ̃tʃɛski]; 5 December 1766, Bastia – 19 March 1813, Danzig), was a French general.

== Life ==
He entered the French service in 1793. He took part in the operations in Corsica in the following year, and received a wound at the siege of San Fiorenzo. After this he left the island and was appointed a field officer in the French Army of Italy, with which he served from 1795 to 1799. He served as a general officer in the campaign of Marengo, in the Naples campaign of 1805-1806, and in the Peninsular War from 1807 to 1809. He was created a baron by Napoleon.

He commanded a Neapolitan brigade in the Russian War of 1812, and after the retreat from Moscow took refuge, with the remnant of his command, in Danzig, where in the course of the siege of 1813 he died.
