= Maurice Lauré =

French civil servant, inventor of the value-added tax

- Born: 24 November 1917; Marrakesh, French Morocco
- Died: 20 April 2001 (aged 83); Neuilly-sur-Seine
- Known for: value added tax

Maurice Lauré (24 November 1917 – 20 April 2001) was a French civil servant. He is primarily known for creating the taxe sur la valeur ajoutée (TVA in French, otherwise known as value added tax (VAT) in English).

Originally an engineer of the École Polytechnique with the French postal and telephone service (PTT), he joined the French tax inspectorate after World War II. In 1952, he became deputy director of the new tax authority, the Direction générale des impôts, which he had helped to create.

In 1954, he invented an indirect tax on consumption which became the TVA. His idea was quickly adopted because it forced taxpayers at all levels in the production process to administer and account for the tax themselves, rather than putting the burden only on retailers or requiring assessment by the tax authorities.

He later joined the board of several private sector companies, including Société Générale (the bank) and Nouvelles Galeries (a retailer).

His name is associated to the fr:Taxe Lauré which is a tax on import goods from countries having an unfair advantage about salaries and working conditions.
