= 1969 in France =

- Decades: 1940s; 1950s; 1960s; 1970s; 1980s
- See also: History of France; Timeline of French history; List of years in France

Events from the year 1969 in France.

== Incumbents ==
- President:
  - until 28 April: Charles de Gaulle
  - 28 April–20 June: Alain Poher
  - starting 20 June: Georges Pompidou
- Prime Minister: Maurice Couve de Murville (until 20 June), Jacques Chaban-Delmas (starting 20 June)

== Events ==
- 2 March – In Toulouse the first Concorde test flight is conducted.
- 27 April – Constitutional Referendum held and proposals were rejected.
- 28 April – President Charles de Gaulle resigns as a result of the referendum.
- 1 June – Presidential Election held.
- 15 June – Presidential Election held and Georges Pompidou is elected.
- 4 August – At the apartment of French intermediary, Jean Sainteny, in Paris, U.S. representative Henry Kissinger and North Vietnamese representative Xuan Thuy begin secret peace negotiations. They eventually fail since both sides cannot agree to any terms.
- 7 October – Launch of the Renault 12 at the Paris Motor Show. The R12 will be sold as a four-door saloon and five-door estate, and is similar in size to French products like the Peugeot 504 and foreign products like the Ford Cortina and Vauxhall Victor.

== Sport ==
- 28 June – Tour de France begins.
- 20 July – Tour de France ends, won by Eddy Merckx of Belgium.

== Births ==
=== January to March ===
- 3 January – Marie Darrieussecq, writer.
- 12 January – Stéphane Stoecklin, handball player.
- 13 January – Thierry Gadou, basketball player.
- 23 January – Christophe Épalle, hammer thrower.
- 4 February – Rémi Lange, film director.
- 7 February – Jean-Michel Ferri, soccer player.
- 8 February – Adrien Duvillard, alpine skier
- 12 February – Jean-Pierre Cyprien, soccer player.
- 16 February – David Douillet, judoka.
- 7 March – Éric Decroix, soccer player.
- 7 March – Christophe Le Roux, soccer player.
- 15 March – Sylvain Curinier, slalom canoer and Olympic medallist.
- 20 March – Fabien Galthié, rugby union player and coach.

=== April to June ===
- 1 April – Jean-Michel Bayle, motorcycle racer.
- 1 April – Arnaud Boetsch, tennis player.
- 3 April – Jean-Marie Aubry, soccer player.
- 3 April – Clotilde Courau, Princess of Venice and Piedmont, actress.
- 3 April – Jean-Jacques Crenca, rugby union player.
- 20 April – Cécile Rigaux, beach volleyball player.
- 23 April – Jean-François Hernandez, soccer player.
- 28 April – Mathilde Feld, politician.
- 2 May – Benoît Cauet, soccer player.
- 5 May – Sophie Moniotte, figure skater.
- 6 May – Emmanuel Larcenet, comics writer and artist.
- 9 May – Frédéric Arpinon, soccer player.
- 13 May – Nikos Aliagas, television presenter.
- 14 May – Stéphane Adam, soccer player and coach.
- 14 May – Stéphan Grégoire, motor racing driver.
- 23 May – Laurent Aïello, motor racing driver.
- 13 June – Virginie Despentes, novelist and filmmaker.
- 16 June – Bénabar, songwriter and singer.
- 28 June – Odile Lesage, heptathlete.
- 30 June – Stéphane Azambre, cross-country skier.

=== July to September ===
- 3 July – Patrick Valéry, soccer player.
- 22 July – Joséphine Teakarotu, politician
- 22 July – Anne Le Hénanff, politician
- 23 July – Stéphane Diagana, athlete.
- 25 July – Yves Dimier, alpine skier.
- 29 July – Ludovic Depickère, swimmer.
- 31 July – Olivier Allamand French freestyle skier and Olympic medallist.
- 23 August – Jean-Marc Tellier, politician.
- 27 August – Jean-Cyril Robin, cyclist.
- 30 August – Laurent Delahousse, journalist.
- 31 August – Nathalie Bouvier, alpine skier.
- 3 September – Georges Sainte-Rose, triple jumper.
- 7 September – Jean-Benoît Dunckel, musician
- 16 September – Laurent Desbiens, cyclist.
- 24 September – Cyrille Magnier, soccer player.
- 26 September – Philippe Sanchez, cross-country skier.

=== October to December ===
- 8 October – Laurent Viaud, soccer player and scout.
- 22 October – Christophe Caze, terrorist (died 1996).
- 6 November – Sophie Villeneuve, cross-country skier.
- 7 November – Hélène Grimaud, pianist.
- 18 November – Anne-Lise Bardet, slalom canoer and Olympic medallist.
- 28 November – Jean-David Morvan, comics author.
- 4 December – Didier Mollard, ski jumper.
- 6 December – Christophe Agnolutto, cyclist.
- 9 December – Bixente Lizarazu, soccer player.
- 12 December – Laurent Chalet, Director of Photography.
- 21 December – Julie Delpy, actress.
- 27 December – Jean-Christophe Boullion, motor racing driver.

=== Full date unknown ===
- Christophe Brunnquell, art director and artist.

== Deaths ==
=== January to June ===
- 2 January – Georges Renavent, actor (born 1894).
- 20 March – Henri Longchambon, politician (born 1896).
- 22 March – Camille Mandrillon, biathlete and Olympic medallist (born 1890).
- 26 March – René Guillot, author (born 1900).
- 6 April – Gabriel Chevallier, novelist (born 1895).
- 3 May – Darius Paul Dassault, General (born 1882).
- 14 May
  - Raymond Louviot, cyclist (born 1908).
  - Jacques Thubé, sailor and Olympic gold medallist (born 1882).
- 18 May – Camille Drevet, anti-colonialist, feminist, and pacifist activist (born 1881).
- 12 June – Emmanuel d'Astier de la Vigerie, journalist, politician and French Resistance member (born 1900).

=== July to December ===
- July – Lou Albert-Lasard, Expressionist painter (born 1885).
- 18 July – Alfred Janniot, Art Deco sculptor (born 1889).
- 3 August
  - Daniel Gousseau, secretary-general of the French Cycling Union.
  - Xavier Lesage, horse rider and Olympic gold medallist (born 1885).
- 7 August – Jean Bastien, soccer player (born 1915).
- 8 September – Alexandra David-Néel, explorer (born 1868).
- 4 October – Léon Brillouin, physicist (born 1889).
- 2 December – Didier Daurat, aviation pioneer (born 1891).
- 6 December – André-Gaston Prételat, general (born 1874).
- 7 December – Élisabeth d'Ayen, tennis player (born 1898).
- 16 December – Alphonse Castex, rugby union player (born 1899).
- 21 December – Georges Catroux, military officer and diplomat (born 1877).
- 26 December – Louise Leveque de Vilmorin, novelist, poet and journalist (born 1902).

=== Full date unknown ===
- Marcel LaFosse, musician and trumpeter (born 1895).

== See also ==
- List of French films of 1969
