= Victor Besaucèle =

French ornithologist

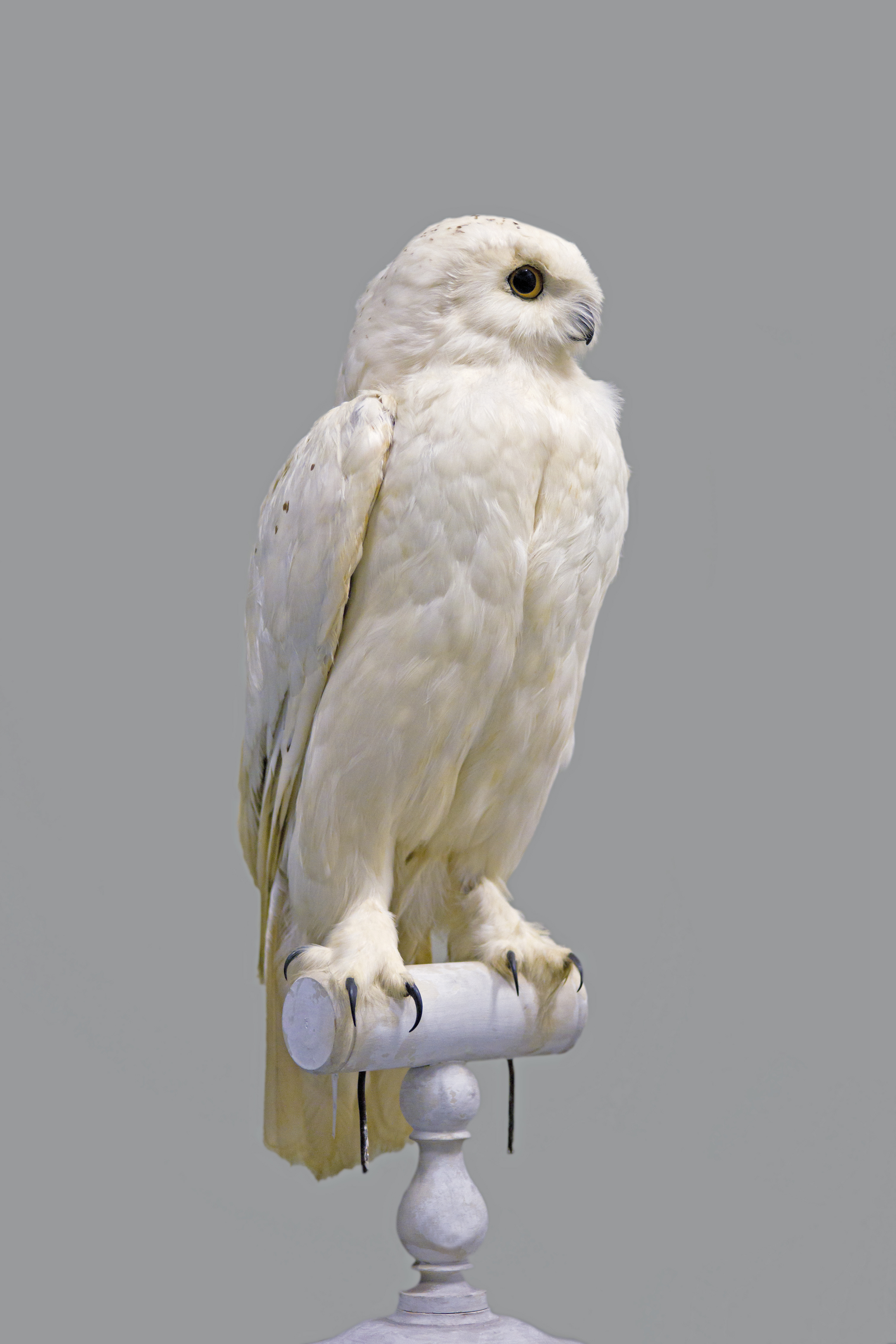
Snowy owl from the Besaucèle collection MHNT

Victor Besaucèle (23 March 1847 – 17 March 1924) was a French ornithologist.

Victor Besaucèle assembled a large collection of birds including French (mainly), European and exotic species. They are now held in the Museum de Toulouse. With 5,000 extant specimens it is one of the most important historic collections in Europe.

== Biography ==
Born in Toulouse on March 23, 1847, Henri Philippe Victor Besaucèle was the son of Henri Besaucèle, a Toulouse lawyer and moderate republican who served as secretary general of the Haute-Garonne prefecture.

After completing his secondary education in Toulouse, Victor went on to study medicine in Paris, where he became familiar with taxidermy by mounting birds at Jules Verreaux, a hub for naturalist collections worldwide in the 19th century. After graduating, he moved to Toulouse and, for two years (1867–1868), worked as a volunteer preparator at the Toulouse Museum of Natural History.

Franco-Prussian War, he was a senior physician and extern at the Hôtel-Dieu hospital in Toulouse. In 1884, he became a city councilor and deputy mayor of Toulouse under the Sirven administration. He remained in this position for four years, playing a role in major projects, the construction of university faculties, and water issues. The botanical garden, as it was in 1929, was very much his work: he redesigned the old enclosure, transforming it into an English garden, laid out paths, dug ponds, and transplanted large trees using equipment he had manufactured himself. As director of the city's gardens, he introduced the art of mosaiculture, which involves creating patterns, coats of arms, or scenes using specific plants. He also proposed moving the old Capitol gate to the botanical garden.

At the same time, Victor Besaucèle played an active role in the Toulouse press: he was a journalist at Le Progrès libéral for 15 years and, in 1885, became the owner of Le Petit Républicain, which later became Sud-Ouest and then Le Télégramme, where he remained a director after selling his shares in 1893.

In 1907, he retired to his estate, “Creuse,” in Portet-sur-Garonne, where he devoted himself to Ornithology, expanding his collection of stuffed birds to become the largest in Europe. He was, in turn, a taxidermist, carpenter, painter, and glazier, wielding a scalpel, a plane, and a paintbrush. He kept a large register, a veritable civil registry of the subjects he classified in his display cases. Despite his voluntary isolation, Victor Besaucèle maintained scientific relationships with an elite group of collectors and ornithologists. He also collected Agavoideae, plants from tropical and arid regions.

He died on March 17, 1924, after bequeathing his collection to the Muséum de Toulouse in 1923.

== Bibliography ==
- Louis Ariste, Louis and Louis Braud (1898). Histoire Populaire de Toulouse Toulouse Bureaux du Midi républicain
- Inventory of major European bird collections
