= Georges Figon =

Georges-Auguste Figon (21 October 1926 – 17 January 1966) was a French chemist who was a freelance barbouze (secret agent). He arranged the meeting with Mehdi Ben Barka in the Brasserie Lipp in Paris. He later told L'Express that he knew who killed Barka and accused General Oufkir, whom Figon had seen torturing Barka.

On 17 January 1966, before the second trial, Figon was found shot dead in his Paris apartment on Rue des Renaudes. Official records ruled death by suicide. In The Great Heroin Coup by Henrik Kruger, the author claims that Christian David shot and killed Figon.

== In popular culture ==
His involvement in the kidnapping of Mehdi Ben Barka is the plot of the movie J'ai vu tuer Ben Barka (2005).
