= André Lafargue =

French journalist and theatre critic

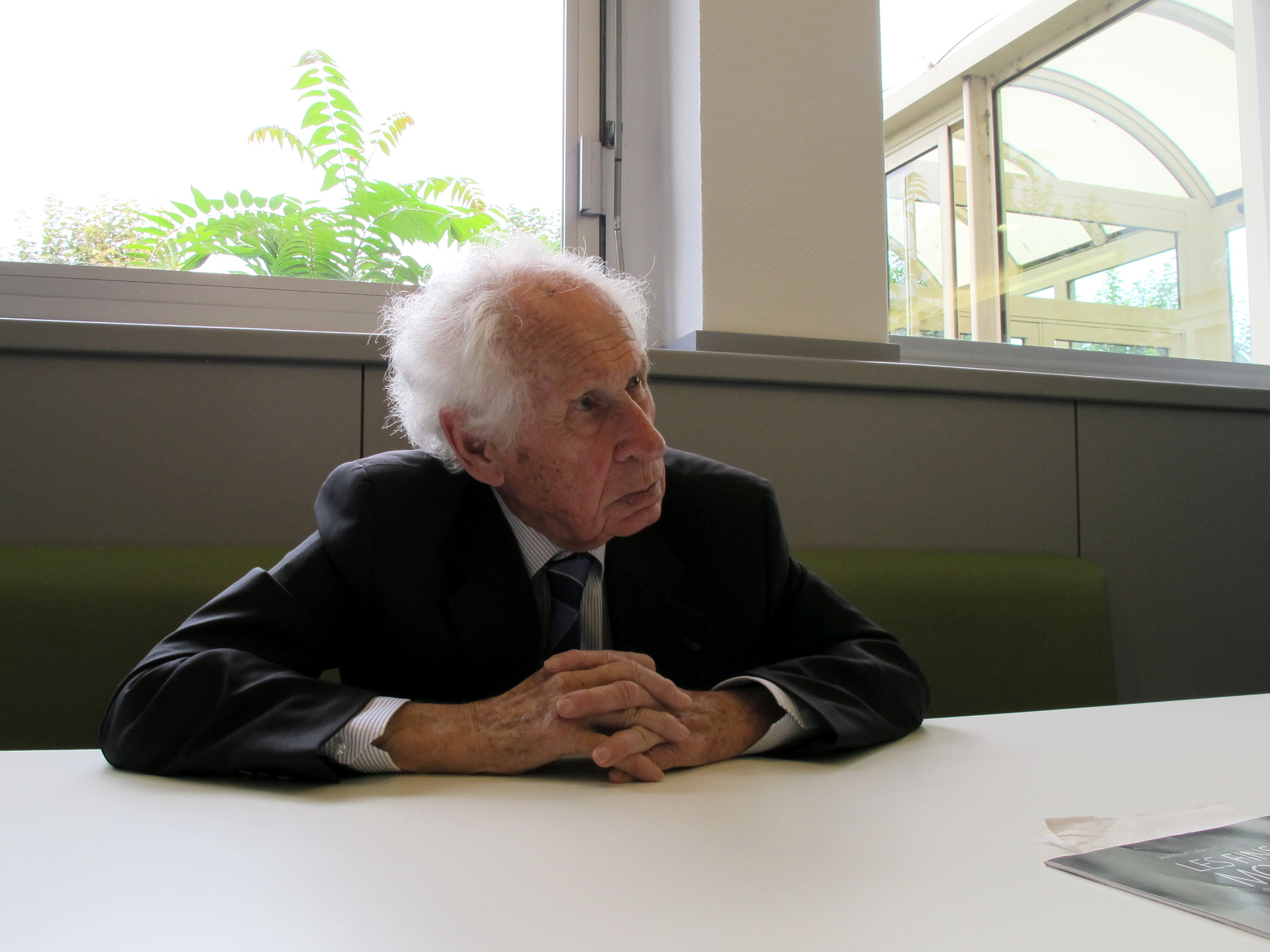
- André Lafargue in 2012
- Born: Jean André Lafargue; 2 July 1917; Paris, France
- Died: 18 July 2017 (aged 100)
- Education: Sciences Po
- Occupation: Journalist
- Spouse(s): Monique Morisi (m. 1957–2017); his death
- Children: 1 son, 1 daughter
- Parent(s): Jean Lafargue; Florence Chamier

André Lafargue (2 July 1917 – 18 July 2017) was a French journalist and theatre critic.

== Early life ==
André Lafargue was born on 2 July 1917 in Paris. His father, Jean Lafargue, was the CEO of an electricity and gas company in Nord. His mother, Florence Chamier, was British of Huguenot descent, born in New South Wales.

Lafargue attended Sciences Po in 1942. While he was a student, Lafargue began writing Résistance, a pro-French Resistance newspaper. He was arrested in 1943 and sent to the Mauthausen-Gusen concentration camp and the Ebensee concentration camp in 1944. He was released by the United States Army in May 1945.

== Career ==
Lafargue began writing for Paris-Matin, later known as Ce matin, le pays, in 1947. A year later, he joined the Parisien libéré, later known as Le Parisien, in 1948. In the 1970s, he was the founding contributor of the theatre reviews in the newspaper. Even though he retired in 1987, he still published articles for its cultural pages.

Lafargue became a knight of the Order of Arts and Letters in 1974.

== Personal life and death ==
Lafargue was married twice, and he had two children. His second wife, Monique Morisi, was an actress. He died on 18 July 2017.

== Honours and awards ==
- Resistance Medal
- Officier of the Ordre des Arts et des Lettres
