= Jean Bourdeau =

French philosopher

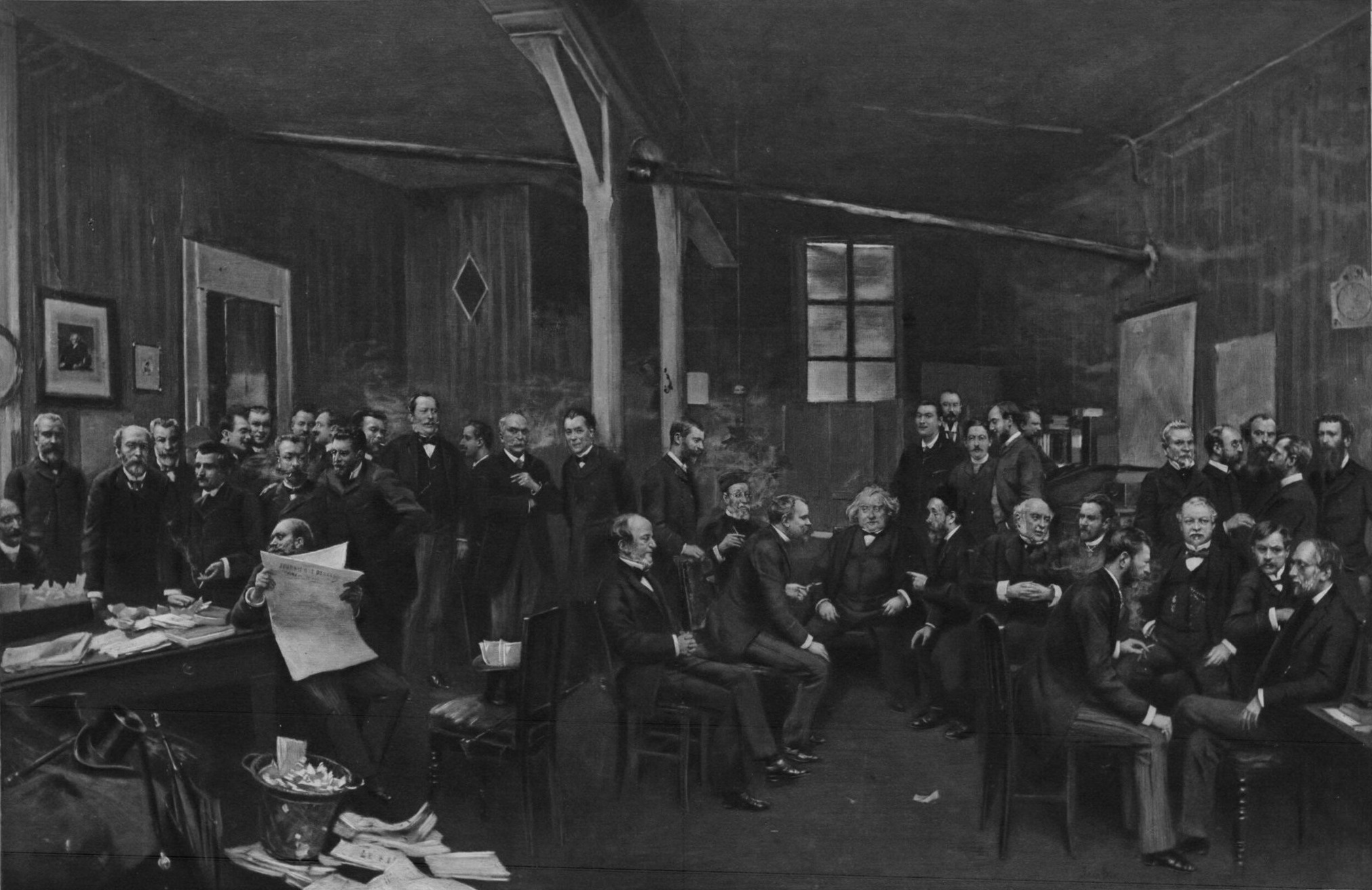
- Born: June 28, 1848; Limoges, France
- Died: September 8, 1928 (aged 80); Cognac-la-Forêt, France
- Occupations: Writer, philosopher, translator, essayist

Philosophical work
- Era: 19th-century philosophy
- Region: Western philosophy
- Main interests: Socialism, political philosophy, pragmatism
- Notable works: Le socialisme allemand et le nihilisme russe L'évolution du socialisme Pragmatisme et modernisme

Jean Bourdeau (28 June 1848 – 8 September 1928) was a French writer, known for his books on aspects of socialism. He was also a translator of Schopenhauer, and an early adopter in France of some of the thought of Nietzsche. He wrote on a wide range of subjects, from Johannes Janssen to Maxim Gorky and the rising personality cult of Lenin. He contributed in particular to the Journal des Débats, on contemporary philosophy.

He was a friend and correspondent of Georges Sorel; Sorel's side of their correspondence has been published.

== Works ==
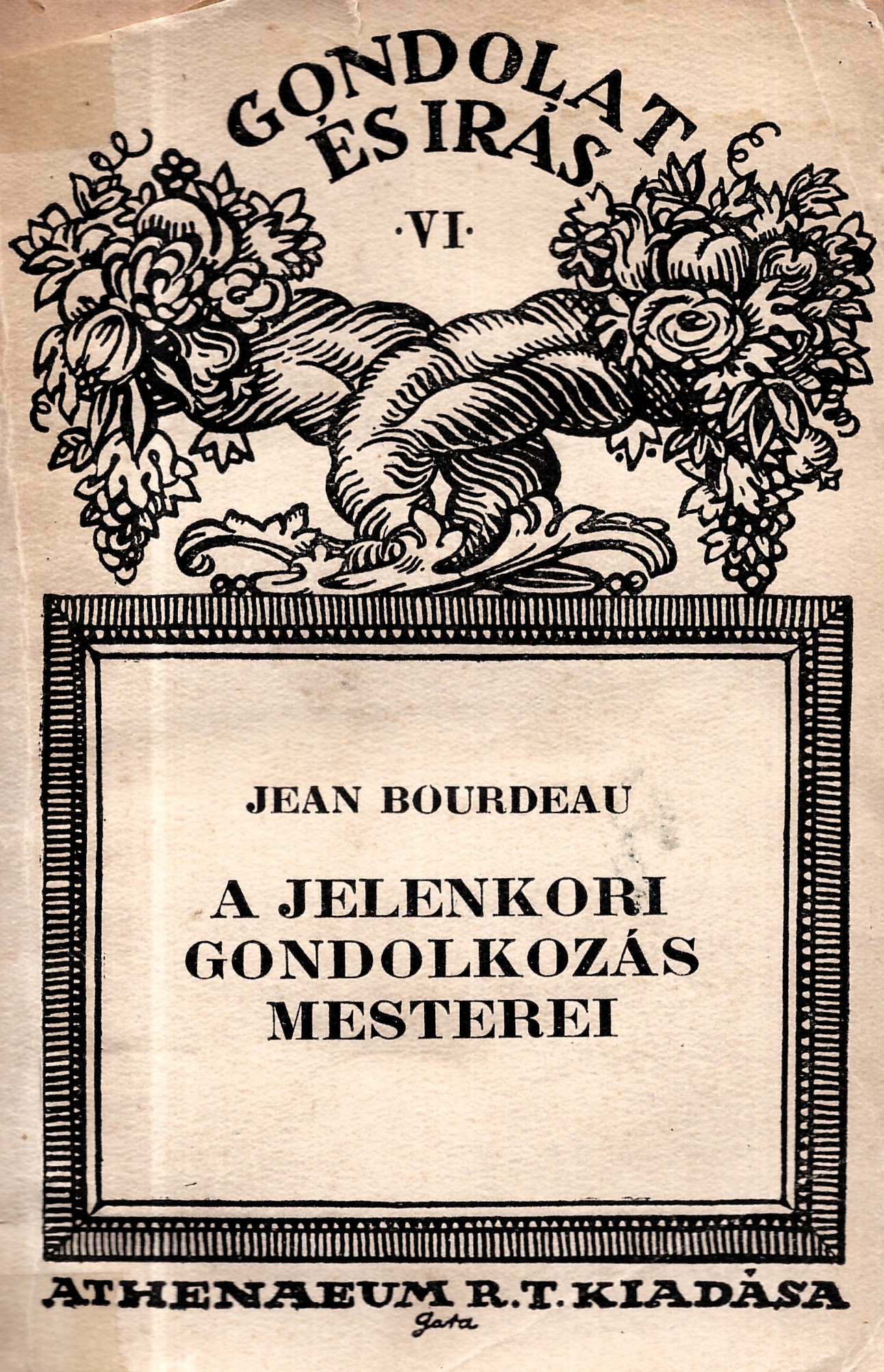

- Le socialisme allemand et le nihilisme russe (1892)
- L'anarchisme révolutionnaire (1894) in La Revue de Paris, vol. I
- La Rochefoucauld (1895)
- L'évolution du socialisme (1901)
- Socialistes et sociologies (1905)
- Poètes et humoristes de l'Allemagne (1906)
- Pragmatisme et modernisme (1909)
- La philosophie affective. Nouveaux courants et nouveaux problèmes dans la philosophie contemporaine (1912) Descartes, Schopenhauer, William James, Bergson, Ribot, A. Fouillée, Tolstoy et Leopardi
- Les maîtres de la pensée contemporaine (1913) Stendhal, Taine, Renan, Herbert Spencer, Nietzsche, Tolstoy, Ruskin, and Victor Hugo
- Tolstoï, Lénine et la Révolution russe (1921)
- La dernière évolution du Socialisme au Communisme (1927)
