= Georges Bénézé =

French philosopher (1888–1978)

Georges Bénézé (26 October 1888 – 24 February 1978) was a French philosopher with a scientific background, which enabled him to temper the French critics of Einstein's Relativity theory during the 1920s.

Bénézé was a disciple and editor of French philosopher Alain. Having completed his higher education as a student of the École normale supérieure (Paris), he taught Hegel's philosophy in a number of provincial lycées, most notably in Poitiers where Jean Hyppolite was a student, then became Professor of Lycée Henri-IV starting in 1936. A regular contributor to L'Œuvre, a collaborationist paper of Vichy France, Bénézé was sentenced to Indignité nationale by virtue of the 1944 Ordonnances, and then fired from public employment. Alain's private journal witnesses his regular calls at his old master's until 1950. His memories of Alain's philosophical teachings (Généreux Alain) were published in 1962.

== Works ==
- Allure du transcendental, 1936
- Valeur. Essai d'une théorie générale, 1936
- (ed.) Les arts et les dieux, 1958
- Généreux Alain, 1962
