= 1917 in France =

- Decades: 1890s; 1900s; 1910s; 1920s; 1930s
- See also: History of France; Timeline of French history; List of years in France

This is a list of events from 1917 in France.

== Incumbents ==
- President: Raymond Poincaré
- President of the Council of Ministers:
  - until 20 March: Aristide Briand
  - 20 March-12 September: Alexandre Ribot
  - 12 September-16 November: Paul Painlevé
  - starting 16 November: Georges Clemenceau

== Events ==
- 13 February – Dutch dancer Mata Hari is arrested in Paris for spying for Germany.
- 9 April – Battle of Arras, a British Empire offensive, begins.
- 16 April – Second Battle of the Aisne begins, the main action of the French Nivelle Offensive.
- 26 April – The Agreement of Saint-Jean-de-Maurienne, between France, Italy and the United Kingdom, to settle interests in the Middle East, is signed.
- 29 April – Architect of the Second Battle of the Aisne and French Commander-in-Chief, General Robert Nivelle, is dismissed and replaced on 15 May by Philippe Pétain.
- 3 May – 1917 French Army mutinies begin when the French 2nd Division refuses to follow orders to attack.
- 9 May – Second Battle of the Aisne ends in failure, leading to desertions.
- 27 May – 1917 French Army mutinies: French Army desertions turn to mutiny as up to 30,000 soldiers leave the front line and reserve trenches and return to the rear at Missy-aux-Bois.
- 16 May – Battle of Arras ends.
- 1 June – 1917 French Army mutinies: A French infantry regiment seizes Missy-aux-Bois, and declares an anti-war military government. Other French army troops soon apprehend them.
- 8 June – 1917 French Army mutinies: French military authorities take action with mass arrests, followed by mass trials.
- 15 August – Battle of Hill 70, an Anglo-Canadian offensive, starts on the outskirts of Lens in the Nord-Pas-de-Calais region.
- 25 August – Battle of Hill 70 ends.
- 15 October – Mata Hari is executed by firing squad at Vincennes for spying.
- 15 November – Georges Clemenceau becomes prime minister of France.
- 20 November – Battle of Cambrai, a British campaign, begins. First successful use of tanks in a combined arms operation.
- 6 December – Battle of Cambrai ends.
- 12 December – Saint-Michel-de-Maurienne derailment results in at least 675 deaths.

== Births ==
=== January to June ===
- 3 January – Pierre Dervaux, operatic conductor and composer (died 1992)
- 24 January – Marcel Hansenne, middle-distance runner (died 2002)
- 11 February – Bernard Destremau, tennis player (died 2002)
- 16 April – Lucienne Delyle, singer (died 1962)
- 22 April – Yvette Chauviré, prima ballerina assoluta (died 2016)
- 25 April – Jean Lucas, motor racing driver (died 2003)
- 29 April – Bernard Blossac, fashion illustrator (died 2002)
- 29 May – Élie de Rothschild, banker (died 2007)
- 31 May – Jean Rouch, filmmaker and anthropologist (died 2004)
- 14 June – Gilbert Prouteau, poet (died 2012)
- 25 June – Claude Seignolle, author (died 2018)

=== July to December ===
- 2 July – André Lafargue, journalist and resistance fighter (died 2017)
- 18 July – Henri Salvador, singer (died 2008)
- 25 July – Philippe De Lacy, actor (died 1995)
- 27 July – Bourvil, actor and singer (died 1970)
- 15 August – Philippe Viannay, journalist (died 1986)
- 17 August – Paul Tessier, surgeon (died 2008)
- 24 September – Jean Hermil, Roman Catholic bishop of Viviers (died 2006)
- 20 October – Jean-Pierre Melville, filmmaker (died 1973)
- 22 October – Annette Laming-Emperaire, archeologist (died 1977)
- 30 October – Maurice Trintignant, motor racing driver (died 2005)
- 5 November – Jacqueline Auriol, aviator, holder of several world speed records (died 2000)
- 11 November – Madeleine Damerment, World War II heroine (executed) (died 1944)
- 19 November – Philippe Ragueneau, journalist and writer (died 2003)
- 22 November – Jean-Étienne Marie, composer (died 1989)
- 24 November – Maurice Lauré, creator of taxe sur la valeur ajoutée (TVA) (died 2001)

=== Full date unknown ===
- Philippe Charbonneaux, industrial designer (died 1998)

== Deaths ==
=== January to June ===
- 4 January – Auguste Chauveau, professor and veterinarian (born 1827)
- 20 January – Amédée Bollée (Amédée père), bell-founder (born 1844)
- 5 February – Édouard Drumont, journalist and writer (born 1844)
- 16 February – Octave Mirbeau, journalist, art critic, pamphleteer, novelist and playwright (born 1848)
- 17 February – Carolus-Duran, painter (born 1837)
- 23 February – Jean Gaston Darboux, mathematician (born 1842)
- 26 February – Joseph Jules Dejerine, neurologist (born 1849)
- 16 March — Friedrich Manschott, German World War I flying ace (born 1893 in Germany)
- 6 April — Friedrich Karl of Prussia, Prince of Prussia (born 1893)
- 10 April – Louis Édouard Fournier, painter (born 1857)
- 7 May – Albert Ball, English fighter pilot (born 1896 in England)
- 10 May – Louis Théophile Joseph Landouzy, neurologist (born 1845)
- 25 May – René Dorme, World War I fighter ace (born 1894; killed in action)
- 30 June – Antonio de La Gandara, painter and draughtsman (born 1861)

=== July to December ===
- 3 August – Stéphane Javelle, astronomer (born 1864)
- 8 September – Charles-Edouard Lefebvre, composer (born 1843)
- 20 September – Émile Boirac, philosopher (born 1851)
- 27 September – Edgar Degas, artist (born 1834)
- 3 November – Léon Bloy, novelist, essayist, pamphleteer and poet (born 1846)
- 5 November – Henri Amédée de Broglie, nobleman (born 1849)
- 15 November – Émile Durkheim, sociologist (born 1858)
- 17 November – Auguste Rodin, sculptor (born 1840)
- 20 December – Lucien Petit-Breton, cyclist, winner of 1907 and 1908 Tour de France (born 1882)

=== Full date unknown ===
- François-Victor Équilbecq, author (born 1872)
- Adolphe Chenevière, novelist (born 1855)

== See also ==
- List of French films of 1917
