= Eugène Pelletan =

French writer, journalist and politician

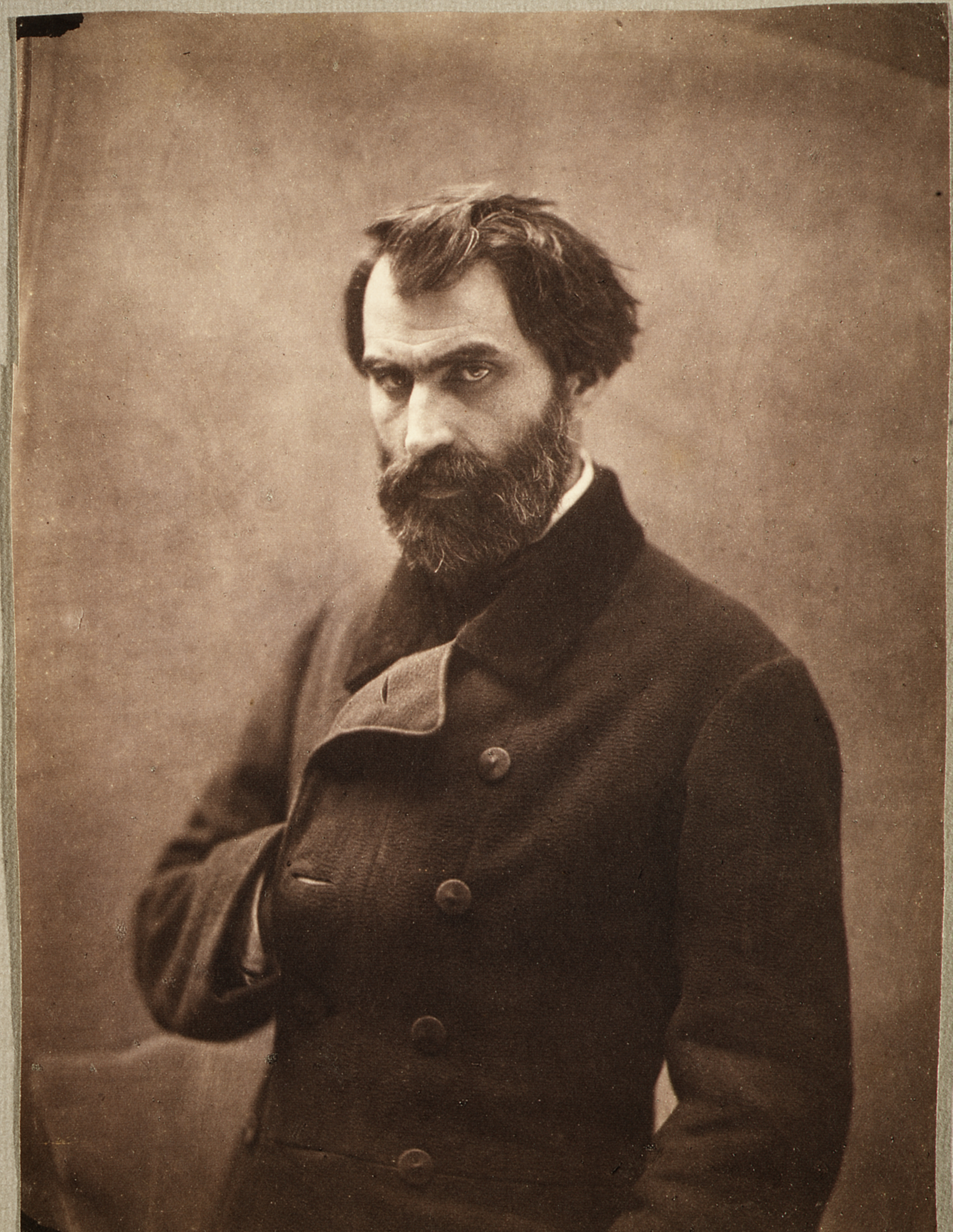
Eugène Pelletan, French writer and journalist

Pierre Clément Eugène Pelletan (29 October 1813 – 13 December 1884) was a French writer, journalist and politician.

== Career ==
Born in Royan, Charente-Maritime, Eugène Pelletan was an associate of Lamartine, but refused an appointment to the office in the foreign affairs ministry. Elected deputy in 1863, he joined the opposition to the Second Empire regime. His bright and eloquent speeches won him fame as a brilliant orator. Re-elected in 1869, he protested against the war with Prussia and became a member of the Government of National Defense on 4 September 1870. From 31 January to 4 February 1871, Pelletan exercised the duties of public education minister, but he departed for Bordeaux on 6 February.

Elected to the National Assembly in February 1871, he approved the politics of Thiers and became vice-president of the Senate in 1879. In 1884, he was elected senator for life.

He was the father of Charles Camille Pelletan (1846–1915), French politician and journalist, and also had a daughter Denise Pelletan (d.1902).
