= 1760 in France =

- Decades: 1740s; 1750s; 1760s; 1770s; 1780s
- See also: History of France; Timeline of French history; List of years in France

Events from the year 1760 in France.

== Incumbents ==
- Monarch – Louis XV

== Events ==
- 14 July – Battle of Emsdorf
- 31 July – Battle of Warburg
- 15 October – Battle of Kloster Kampen
- Claimed – Foundation of Lombart Chocolate company

== Births ==
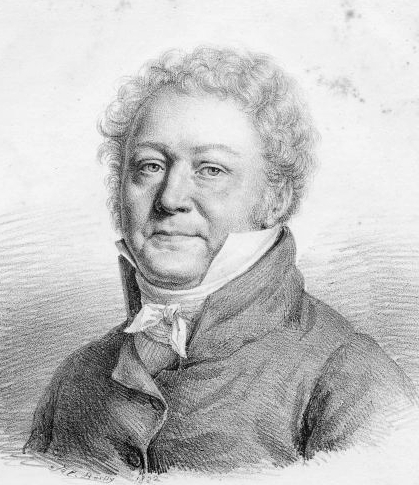
Guillaume Guillon-Lethière

- 10 January – Guillaume Guillon-Lethière, painter (died 1832)
- 5 February – Charlotte de Robespierre (died 1834)
- 2 March – Camille Desmoulins, journalist and politician during the French Revolution (executed 1794)
- 30 September – Madame de Saint-Laurent (died 1830)
- 6 October – Victoire Babois, poet and writer of elegies (died 1839)
- 20 October – Alexandre-Théodore-Victor, comte de Lameth, soldier and politician (died 1829)

== Deaths ==
- 3 April – Jacob B. Winslow, anatomist (born 1669)
- 11 April – Louis de Silvestre, painter (born 1675)
- 10 June – Louis-Gui de Guérapin de Vauréal, ecclesiastic and diplomat (born 1688)
- 13 September – Guy Auguste de Rohan-Chabot, nobleman (born 1683)
- 14 November – François Colin de Blamont, violinist and composer (born 1690)

=== Full date unknown ===
- Pierre-Alexandre Aveline, engraver, portraitist, illustrator and printmaker (born 1702)
- François Bouvard, composer (born c.1684)
- Claude Moët, wine merchant (born 1683)
