= 1767 in France =

- Decades: 1740s; 1750s; 1760s; 1770s; 1780s
- See also: History of France; Timeline of French history; List of years in France

Events from the year 1767 in France.

== Incumbents ==
- Monarch – Louis XV

== Events ==
- 24 March – Spain acquires control of the Falkland Islands (les Îles Malouines) from France, compensating Admiral Louis Antoine de Bougainville for the money spent on the construction of the settlement at Fort Saint Louis.
- 19 June – The last of several animals (probably wolves) to be known over the past 3 years as the Beast of Gévaudan is shot.
- 24 October – Several anti-Jewish regulations in place since 1661, are repealed by the King's Council. While Jewish merchants are still prohibited from owning their own retail stores, they are allowed to sell merchandise on credit to gentile merchants at legal interest rates, to legally enforce debts, and to sell jewelry.

== Popular culture ==
=== Opera ===
- 24 November – Ernelinde, princesse de Norvège, a three-act operatic tragédie lyrique, composed by François-André Danican Philidor, was first performed by the Paris Opera at the Salle des Machines in the Palais des Tuileries in Paris.

== Births ==
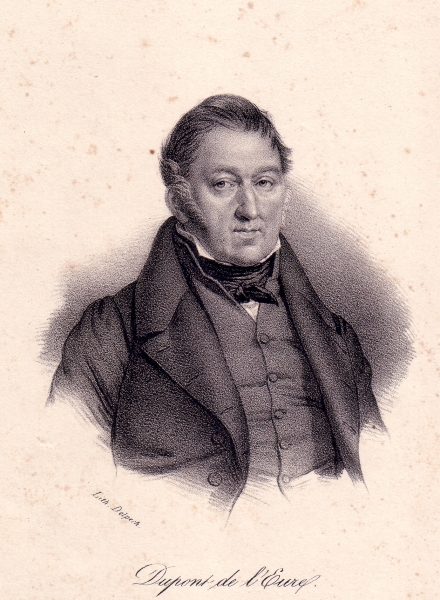
Jacques-Charles Dupont de l'Eure, 24th Prime Minister of France.

- 27 February – Jacques-Charles Dupont de l'Eure, statesman (died 1855)
- 25 March – Joachim Murat, general, Marshal of France, and King of Naples (died 1815)
- 4 April – Constance Marie Charpentier, painter (died 1849)
- 9 April – Joseph Fiévée, journalist, novelist, essayist and playwright (died 1839)
- 21 April – Étienne-Denis Pasquier, Chancelier de France (died 1862)
- 25 April – Nicolas Oudinot, Marshal of France (died 1847)
- 19 June – Joseph François Michaud, historian and publicist (died 1839)
- 27 June – Alexis Bouvard, astronomer (died 1843)
- 25 August – Louis Antoine de Saint-Just, politician during the French Revolution (died 1794)
- 1 October – Victor Marie du Pont, diplomat (died 1827)
- 15 October – Gabriel Richard, Roman Catholic priest, second founder of the city of Detroit, MI, USA, and co-founder of the University of Michigan (died 1832)
- 25 October – Charlotte Louise de Rohan, noblewoman (died 1841)

== Deaths ==
- 9 February – Hubert Drouais, painter (born 1699)
- 19 February – François Boissier de Sauvages de Lacroix, physician and botanist (born 1706)
- 6 March – Jacques Clinchamps de Malfilâtre, poet (born 1732)
- 20 March – Firmin Abauzit, scientist (born 1679)
- 9 May – Louis Vigée, painter (born 1715)
- 1 October – Léon Ménard, lawyer and historical writer (born 1706)
- 2 October – Louise-Magdeleine Horthemels, engraver (born 1686)
- 7 November – Georges Vallon, architect (born 1688)

=== Full date unknown ===
- Marie Anne Victoire Pigeon, mathematician (born 1724)
