= 1768 in France =

- Decades: 1740s; 1750s; 1760s; 1770s; 1780s
- See also: History of France; Timeline of French history; List of years in France

Events from the year 1768 in France.

== Incumbents ==
- Monarch – Louis XV

== Events ==
- 1 March – King Louis XV decrees that all cities and towns in the kingdom will be required to post house numbering on all residential buildings, primarily to facilitate the forced quartering of troops in citizens' homes
- 15 May – French conquest of Corsica: Treaty of Versailles – The island of Corsica is ceded to France by the Republic of Genoa
- 16 September – Louis XV appoints René de Maupeou as Chancellor (an office he will hold until 1790) and orders him to crush the judicial opposition
- 8 October – French conquest of Corsica: Battle of Borgo – French forces are defeated by Corsicans
- 29 October – French colonists in Louisiana refuse to accept the colony's acquisition by Spain and begin an uprising that forces Spanish Governor Antonio de Ulloa to flee

=== Full date unknown ===
- The Petit Trianon, originally designed by Ange-Jacques Gabriel for Madame de Pompadour, is completed in the park of the Palace of Versailles and inaugurated by Louis XV for Marie Antoinette

== Births ==
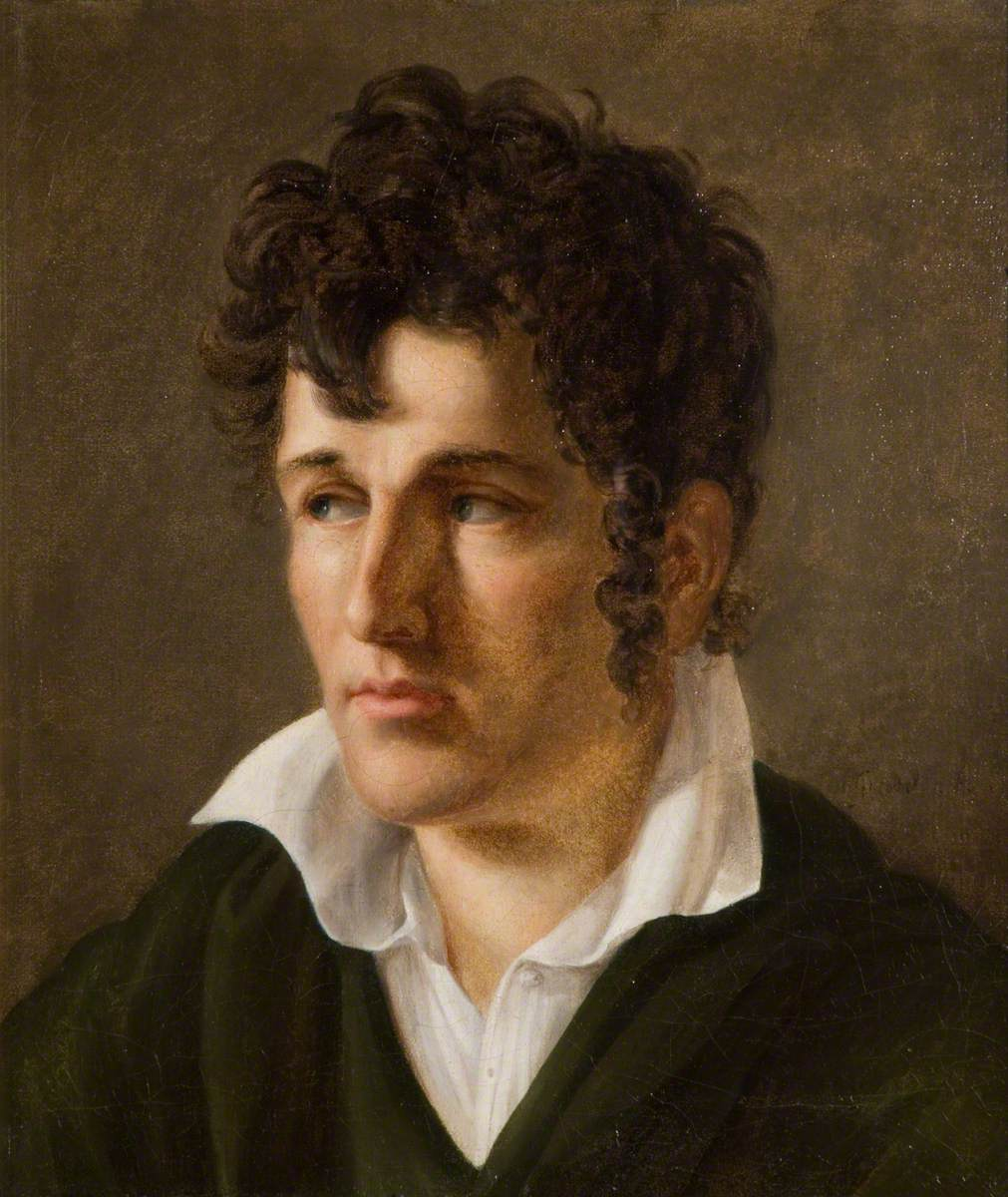
François-René de Chateaubriand

- 3 March – Rosalie Lamorlière, royal servant (died 1848)
- 21 March – Joseph Fourier, mathematician and physicist (died 1830)
- 27 July – Charlotte Corday, murderer of Jean-Paul Marat (executed 1793)
- 6 August – Jean-Baptiste Bessières, Marshall of France (died 1813)
- 4 September – François-René de Chateaubriand, writer, politician, diplomat and historian (died 1848)

== Deaths ==
- 1 January – Jean Restout the Younger, painter (born 1692)
- 2 September – Antoine Deparcieux, mathematician (born 1703)
- 8 October – Pierre Simon Fournier, punch-cutter, typefounder and typographic theoretician (born 1712)
- 28 October – Michel Blavet, composer and flutist (born 1700)

=== Full date unknown ===
- Élisabeth de Haulteterre, composer and violinist (fl. 1737)
