= 1761 in France =

- Decades: 1740s; 1750s; 1760s; 1770s; 1780s
- See also: History of France; Timeline of French history; List of years in France

Events from the year 1761 in France.

== Incumbents ==
- Monarch: Louis XV

== Births ==
- February 16 – Charles Pichegru, French general (d. 1804)
- March 6 – Antoine-Francois Andreossy, French general (d. 1828)
- October 21 – Louis Albert Guislain Bacler d'Albe, French painter and cartographer (d. 1824)
- November 4 – Bertrand Andrieu, French engraver of medals (d. 1822)
- December 1 – Marie Tussaud, French wax modeller (d. 1850)

== Deaths ==
- September 8 – Bernard Forest de Bélidor, French engineer (b. 1698)
