= 1763 in France =

- Decades: 1740s; 1750s; 1760s; 1770s; 1780s
- See also: History of France; Timeline of French history; List of years in France

Events from the year 1763 in France.

== Incumbents ==
- Monarch – Louis XV

== Events ==
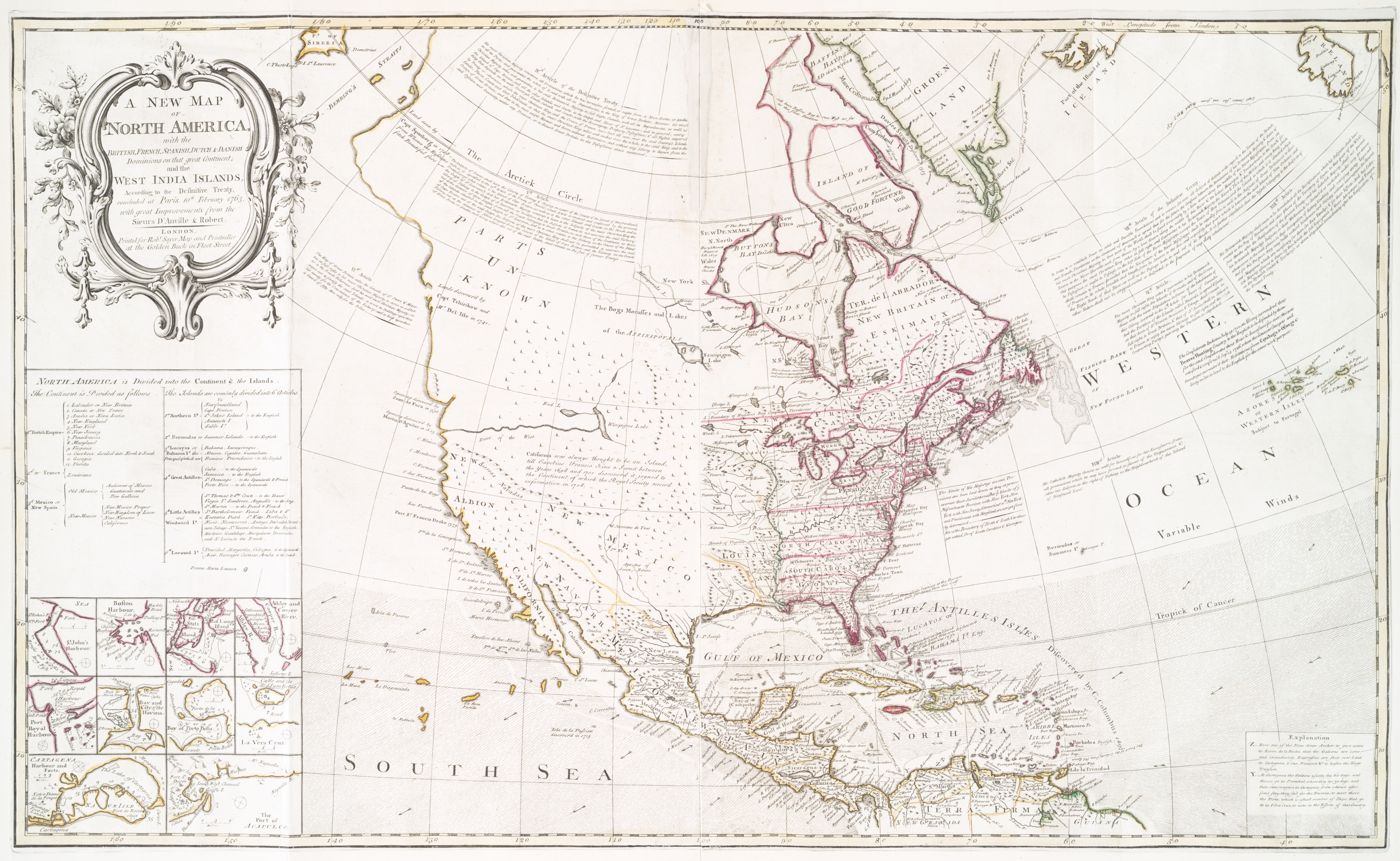
"A new map of North America" - produced following the Treaty of Paris.

- 10 February – The Treaty of Paris formally ended the Seven Years' War.

== Births ==
- 24 January – Jean-Nicolas Bouilly, playwright, librettist, children's writer, and politician (died 1842)
- 21 June – Joseph Chabran, military officer (died 1843)
- 22 June – Étienne Méhul, composer (died 1817)
- 31 December – Pierre-Charles Villeneuve, naval officer (died 1806)

== Deaths ==
- 21 January – Jean-François Oeben, cabinetmaker (born 1721)
- 23 April – Jean Daullé, engraver (born 1703)
