= 1766 in France =

France in 1766

- Decades: 1740s; 1750s; 1760s; 1770s; 1780s
- See also: History of France; Timeline of French history; List of years in France

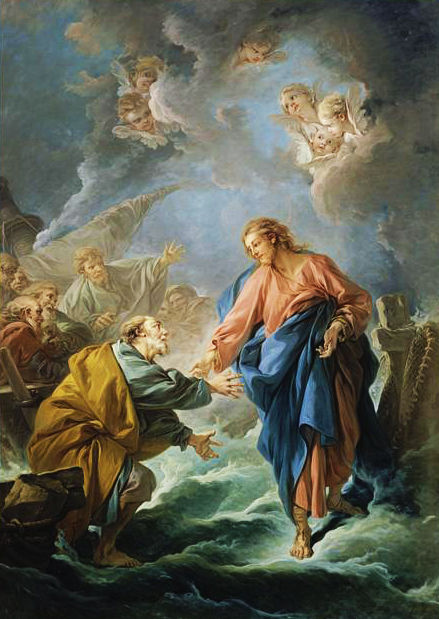
Saint Peter Attempting to Walk on Water, oil painting from 1766 by François Boucher

== Incumbents ==
- Monarch – Louis XV

== Events ==
In 1766, France was an absolute, divine-right monarchy. Society had been divided into the Three Estates. Under the reign of King Louis XV, commoners in the Third Estate faced profound social and economic inequality.

On February 23, 1766, the Duchy of Lorraine was formally annexed by the Kingdom of France, marking the kingdom's largest territorial gain since the 17th century.

On March 3, 1766, Louis XV gave a speech to the Parlement of Paris, famously known as the "Séance de la flagellation", or "Session of the Scourging." He addressed his problems with the actions of the magistrates, opposing the idea of unity and delivering a strong statement promoting absolutism. His aggressive assertion of authority further divided France.

== Art ==
- Saint Peter Attempting to Walk on Water, oil painting by François Boucher
- The Swing (commissioned 1766, painted 1767), oil painting by Jean-Honoré Fragonard

== Births ==
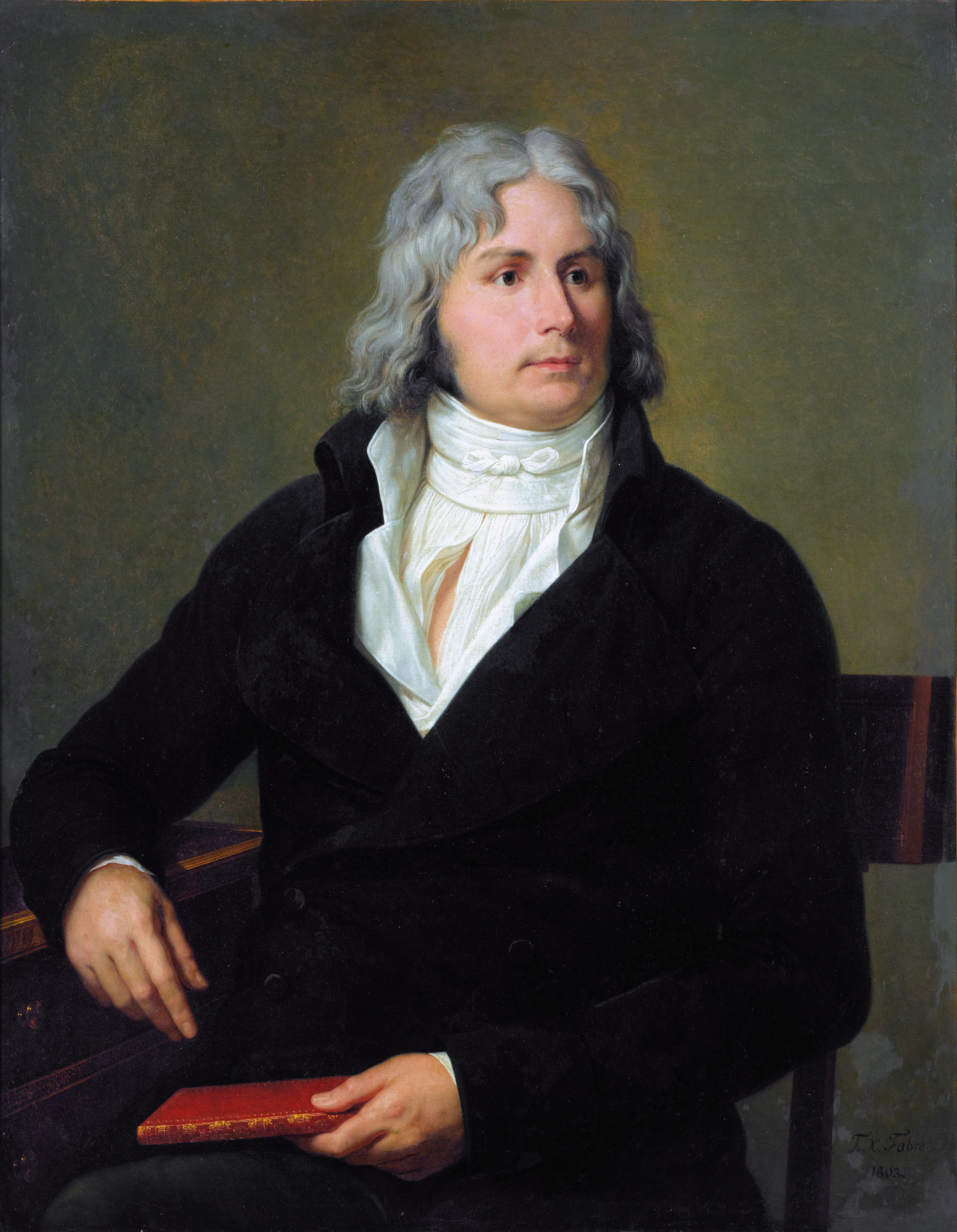
Louis-François Bertin

- 8 July – Dominique Jean Larrey, surgeon and military doctor(died 1842)
- 6 August – Charles-François Beautemps-Beaupré, hydrographic engineer and cartographer (died 1854)
- 7 October – Marie-François Auguste de Caffarelli du Falga, military officer (died 1849)
- 14 December – Louis-François Bertin, journalist and publisher (died 1841)

=== Full date unknown ===
- Thomas Henry (patron of the arts), painter and patron of the arts (died 1836)

== Deaths ==
- 19 January – Giovanni Niccolò Servandoni, decorator and architect (born 1695)
- 9 May – Thomas Arthur, comte de Lally, military officer (born 1702)
- 24 June – Adrien Maurice de Noailles, aristocrat and soldier (born 1678)
- 7 November – Jean-Marc Nattier, painter (born 1685)
