= 1765 in France =

- Decades: 1740s; 1750s; 1760s; 1770s; 1780s
- See also: History of France; Timeline of French history; List of years in France

Events from the year 1765 in France.

== Incumbents ==
- Monarch: Louis XV

== Events ==
- École nationale vétérinaire d'Alfort founded
- The Hennessy cognac house founded

== Births ==
- 11 January – Antoine Alexandre Barbier, librarian (died 1825)
- 7 March – Nicéphore Niépce, inventor, pioneer photographer (died 1833)
- 26 July – Jean-Baptiste Drouet, Comte d'Erlon, marshal (died 1844)
- 4 August – Claire Lacombe, actress and revolutionary
- 1 September – Étienne Pellot, "le Renard Basque", corsair (died 1856)
- 15 October – Joseph Dutens, engineer (died 1848)
- 17 November – Jacques MacDonald, marshal (died 1840)
- 3 December – Adélaïde Dufrénoy, poet and painter from Brittany (died 1825)

=== Full date unknown ===
- James Smithson, British chemist, mineralogist and posthumous founder of the Smithsonian Institution in the United States (died 1829 in Italy)

== Deaths ==
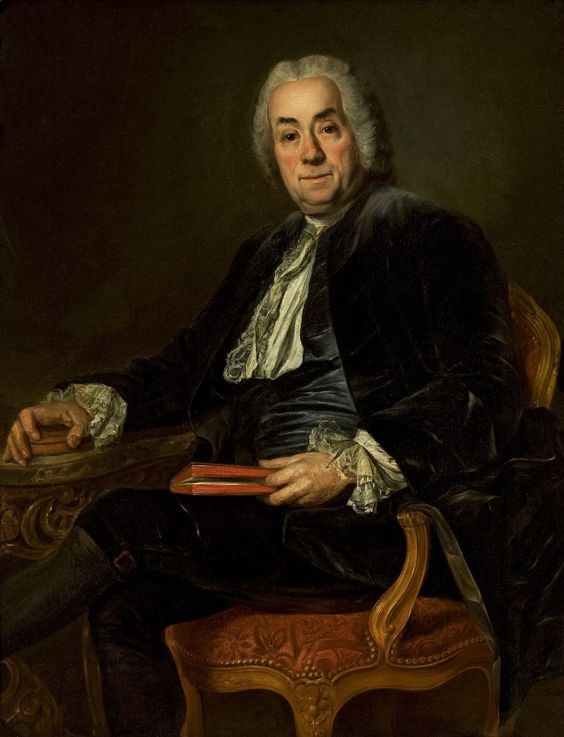
Anne Claude de Caylus

- 23 February – Jean Girard, organist (born 1696)
- 15 April – Élisabeth Alexandrine de Bourbon, princess (born 1705)
- 29 June – François Dominique Barreau de Chefdeville, architect (born 1725)
- 5 September – Anne Claude de Caylus, antiquarian, proto-archaeologist and man of letters (born 1692)
- 26 September – Jean-Baptiste Bénard de la Harpe, explorer of North America (born 1683)
- 20 December – Louis, Dauphin of France (born 1729)
