= 1970 in France =

- Decades: 1950s; 1960s; 1970s; 1980s; 1990s
- See also: History of France; Timeline of French history; List of years in France

Events from the year 1970 in France.

== Incumbents ==
- President: Georges Pompidou
- Prime Minister: Jacques Chaban-Delmas

== Events ==
- 10 February – An avalanche at Val d'Isère kills 39 tourists.
- 8 March – Cantonales Elections held.
- 15 March – Cantonales Elections held.
- 25 March – Concorde makes its first supersonic flight (700 mph/1127 km/h).
- 11 April – 74 people, mostly young boys, die as an avalanche buries a tuberculosis sanatorium in the French Alps.
- 19 May – Barbapapa was created by Annette Tison and Talus Taylor.
- 6 October – President Georges Pompidou visits the Soviet Union.
- 11 October – Eleven French soldiers are killed in a shootout with rebels in Chad.
- 1 November – Club Cinq-Sept fire in Saint-Laurent-du-Pont, Isère, kills 146.
- Undated
  - Citroen launches two new models: the GS family saloon and estate, and the SM sporting coupe. The Citroen GS is voted European Car of the Year.
  - Establishment of Parc naturel régional de Camargue.

== Sport ==
- 27 June – Tour de France begins.
- 19 July – Tour de France ends, won by Eddy Merckx of Belgium.

== Births ==
=== January to March ===
- 10 January – Christine Malèvre, serial killer.
- 28 January – Laurent Levesque, film score composer.
- 29 January
  - Jacqueline Delord, swimmer
  - Olivier Edmond, golfer.
- 3 February – Franck Gava, soccer player.
- 6 February – Patrice Loko, soccer player.
- 14 February – Guillaume Raoux, tennis player.
- 17 February – Philippe Bernat-Salles, international rugby union player.
- 4 March – Amélie Sarn, author, comic book writer and translator.
- 7 March – Nathalie Lancien, cyclist and Olympic gold medallist.
- 12 March – Marine Delterme, actress, painter, sculptor and former model.
- 13 March – Stéphane Goubert, cyclist.
- 21 March – Franck David, sailor and Olympic gold medallist.
- 27 March – Gedeon Naudet, filmmaker.
- 28 March – Benjamin Castaldi, television personality

=== April to June ===
- 10 April – Christophe Honoré, writer and film director.
- 14 April – Richard Sainct, Rally Raid Motorcycle rider (d.2004).
- 15 April – Luc Marquet, volleyball player.
- 24 April – Jean-Philippe Belloc, motor racing driver.
- 3 May – Alexia Dechaume-Balleret, tennis player.
- 5 May – Laurent Crost, judoka.
- 13 May – Wilfrid Boulineau, decathlete.
- 21 May – Pierre Billaud, radio reporter and journalist, killed in Afghanistan (d.2001).
- 22 May – Guillaume Warmuz, soccer player.
- 15 June – Gaëlle Méchaly, soprano.
- 18 June – Ludovic Pollet, soccer player.
- 27 June – Régine Cavagnoud, alpine skier (d.2001).
- 27 June – Christophe Deguerville, soccer player.
- 30 June – Emmanuel Mouret, actor, director and screenwriter

=== July to September ===
- 9 July – Benoit Pierre Emery, fashion designer.
- 18 August – Cédric Vasseur, cyclist.
- 20 August – Loïc De Kergret, volleyball player.
- 28 August – Loïc Leferme, free diver (d.2007).
- 3 September – Franck Chambilly, judoka.
- 6 September – Stéphane Guivarc'h, international soccer player.
- 9 September – Pierre Laigle, soccer player.
- 10 September – Julie Halard-Decugis, tennis player.
- 18 September – Didier Rous, cyclist.
- 22 September – Emmanuel Petit, soccer player.

=== October to December ===
- 23 October – Stéphane Nomis, judoka.
- 27 October – Alain Boghossian, soccer player.
- 5 November – Laurent D'Jaffo, soccer player.
- 11 November – Gilles Grimandi, soccer player.
- 15 November – Franck Rabarivony, soccer player.
- 25 November – Bruno Girard, boxer.
- 13 December – Pierre Laurent, soccer player.
- 15 December – Corinne Favre, ski mountaineer and mountain runner.
- 30 December – Frédéric Tatarian, soccer player.

=== Full date unknown ===
- Julien Lourau, jazz saxophonist.
- Vincent Paronnaud, comics artist and filmmaker.

== Deaths ==
=== January to March ===
- 4 January – Jean-Étienne Valluy, general (b. 1899).
- 8 January – Georges Guibourg, French actor, singer, and playwright (b. 1891)
- 20 January – François Tanguy-Prigent, politician and resistance fighter (b. 1909).
- 25 January – Jane Bathori, opera singer (b. 1877).
- 29 January – Marie-Laure de Noailles, patron of the arts (b. 1902).
- 1 February – Eugène Christophe, cyclist (b. 1885).
- 20 February – Gaston Modot, actor (b. 1887).
- 17 March – Jérôme Carcopino, historian and author (b. 1881).
- 22 March – Georges Malkine, painter (b. 1898).

=== April to June ===
- 10 April – Henri Marchal, archaeologist (b. 1876).
- 22 May – Georges Limbour, writer (b. 1900).
- 23 May – René Capitant, lawyer and politician (b. 1901).
- 2 June – Albert Lamorisse, filmmaker, producer and writer (b. 1922).
- 6 June – Camille Bombois, naïve painter (b. 1883).
- 15 June – Henri Queuille, Radical-Socialist politician and Prime Minister of France (b. 1884).
- 16 June – Elsa Triolet, writer (b. 1896).
- 27 June – Pierre Mac Orlan, novelist and songwriter (b. 1882).

=== July to September ===
- 10 July – Félix Gaillard, Radical politician and Prime Minister of France (b. 1919).
- 11 July – André Lurçat, architect (b. 1894).
- 19 July – Henri Lauvaux, athlete and Olympic medallist (b. 1900).
- 30 July – Jean d'Eaubonne, art director (b. 1903).
- 5 August – Lucien Lamoureux, politician and Minister (b. 1888).
- 25 August – Marcel Allain, writer (b. 1885).
- 1 September – François Mauriac, author, winner of the Nobel Prize in Literature (b. 1885).
- 2 September – Marie Pierre Kœnig, general and politician (b. 1898).
- 5 September – André Simon, wine merchant, gourmet and writer (b. 1877).
- 23 September – Bourvil, actor and singer (b. 1917).

=== October to December ===
- 8 October – Jean Giono, author (b. 1895).
- 9 October – Edmond Michelet, politician (b. 1899).
- 10 October – Édouard Daladier, Radical-Socialist politician and Prime Minister of France (b. 1884).
- 18 October – Jean De Briac, actor (b. 1891).
- 2 November – Pierre Veyron, motor racing driver (b. 1903).
- 6 November – Henri Jeanson, writer and journalist (b. 1900).
- 9 November – Charles de Gaulle, general, statesman, President (b. 1890).
- 1 December – Hermine David, painter (b. 1886).
- 7 December – Émile Girardeau, engineer (b. 1882).
- 16 December – Laurent Eynac, politician and Minister (b. 1886).
- 18 December – Marc Boegner, theologist, pastor, French Resistance member and essayist (d.1881).

=== Full date unknown ===
- Lucienne Abraham, Trotskyist politician (b. 1916).
- Maurice Lafforgue, alpine skier (b. 1913).

== See also ==
- List of French films of 1970
