= 1966 in France =

- Decades: 1940s; 1950s; 1960s; 1970s; 1980s
- See also: History of France; Timeline of French history; List of years in France

Events from the year 1966 in France.

== Incumbents ==
- President: Charles de Gaulle
- Prime Minister: Georges Pompidou

== Events ==
- 4 January – Feyzin disaster: a gas leak and fire at the Feyzin oil refinery near Lyon kills 18 and injures 84.
- 10 January – L'Express publishes allegations by secret agent Georges Figon, who took part in the kidnapping of Mehdi Ben Barka.
- 18 January – Police announce that Georges Figon committed suicide prior to his arrest for his part in the kidnapping of Mehdi Ben Barka.
- 7 March – Charles de Gaulle asks U.S. President Lyndon B. Johnson for negotiations about the state of NATO equipment in France.
- 11 March – President Charles de Gaulle states that French troops will be taken out of NATO and that all French NATO bases and headquarters must be closed within a year.
- 17 June – An Air France personnel strike begins.
- 20 June – President Charles de Gaulle starts a visit to the Soviet Union.
- 30 June – France formally leaves the military structure of NATO.
- 26 August – Riots occur in French Somaliland.
- 30 August – France offers independence to French Somaliland.
- 11 October – France and the Soviet Union sign a treaty for cooperation in nuclear research.
- 26 October – NATO moves its headquarters from Paris to Brussels.

== Sport ==
- 21 June – Tour de France begins.
- 14 July – Tour de France ends, won by Lucien Aimar.

== Births ==
=== January to March ===
- 12 January – Olivier Martinez, actor
- 17 January – Jean-Pierre Delaunay, soccer player and coach.
- 24 January – Julie Dreyfus, actress.
- 1 February – Laurent Garnier, techno music producer and DJ.
- 3 February – Jean-Jacques Eydelie, soccer player.
- 4 February – Guillaume Dasquié, journalist and writer.
- 28 February – Eric Dubus, athlete.
- 29 March – Stéphane Bré, soccer referee.

=== April to June ===
- 3 April – Rémi Garde, soccer player and coach.
- 19 April – Véronique Gens, soprano.
- 24 April – Pascale Paradis, tennis player.
- 26 April – Jean-Christophe Jeauffre, explorer, filmmaker and producer.
- 28 April – Jean-Luc Crétier, alpine skier and Olympic gold medallist.
- 11 May – Estelle Lefébure, supermodel.
- 14 May
  - Marianne Denicourt, actress.
  - Fab Morvan, singer
- 17 May – Gilles Quénéhervé, athlete and Olympic medallist.
- 24 May – Eric Cantona, soccer player.
- 29 May – Natalie Nougayrède, journalist.
- 30 May – Frédéric Hantz, soccer manager.
- 14 June
  - Thierry Bonalair, soccer player.
  - Béatrice Mouthon, triathlete.
  - Isabelle Mouthon-Michellys, triathlete.
- 16 June
  - Patrice Killoffer, comics illustrator and writer.
  - Stéphane Traineau, judoka and Olympic medallist.
- 18 June – Catherine Fleury-Vachon, judoka and Olympic gold medallist.
- 22 June – Emmanuelle Seigner, actress.

=== July to September ===
- 1 July – Stéphan Caron, swimmer and Olympic medallist.
- 5 July – Laurence Ferrari, journalist.
- 8 July – Jean-Philippe Jódard, beach volleyball player.
- 15 July – Irène Jacob, actress.
- 4 August – Luc Leblanc, cyclist.
- 5 August – Gilles Delion, cyclist.
- 13 August – Pascal Lino, cyclist.
- 28 August – Christophe Galtier, soccer player.
- 31 August – Thierry Champion, tennis player.
- 2 September – Olivier Panis, motor racing driver.
- 3 September – Angelo Hugues, soccer player.
- 4 September – Biréli Lagrène, guitarist and bassist.
- 24 September – Christophe Bouchut, motor racing driver.
- 29 September – Laurent Chambertin, volleyball player.

=== October to December ===
- 10 October – Laurent Duhamel, soccer referee.
- 18 October – Thierry Lamberton, ice speed skater.
- 25 October – Lionel Charbonnier, soccer player.
- 6 November – Laurent Lafforgue, mathematician.
- 17 November – Sophie Marceau, actress.
- 19 November
  - Dominique Arnould, cyclist.
  - Thierry Perez, politician
- 23 November – Vincent Cassel, actor.
- 30 November – Philippe Bozon, ice hockey player.
- 10 December – Benjamin Clément, soccer player.
- 20 December – Hélène Rollès, actress and singer.
- 29 December
  - Laurent Boudouani, boxer and Olympic medallist.
  - Patrice Rognon, judoka and Olympic medallist.

=== Full date unknown ===
- Jean-Pascal Beintus, composer.
- Catherine Dufour, writer.

== Deaths ==
=== January to March ===
- 1 January – Vincent Auriol, politician, President of France (born 1884).
- 4 January – Marcel Tabuteau, oboist (born 1887).
- 6 January – Jean Lurçat, painter and tapestry designer (born 1892).
- 22 January – Jean Galtier-Boissière, writer, polemist and journalist (born 1891).
- 11 March – Jean Laigret, biologist (born 1893).
- 16 March – Jean Neuberth, abstract painter (born 1915).
- 31 March – Andre Richaume, archetier/bowmaker (born 1905).

=== April to June ===
- 13 April – Georges Duhamel, author (born 1884).
- 4 May – Amédée Ozenfant, cubist painter (born 1886).
- 24 May – Henri Barbé, communist (born 1902).
- 7 June – Jean Arp, sculptor, painter, poet and abstract artist (born 1886).
- 13 June – Pierre Chaumié, politician (born 1880).
- 19 June – Pierre Montet, Egyptologist (born 1885).
- 26 June – François Dupré, hotelier, art collector and horse breeder (born 1888).

=== July to September ===
- 14 July – Julie Manet, painter and art collector (born 1878).
- 29 July – André Spire, poet, writer, and Zionist activist (born 1868).
- 17 August – François Piétri, politician, Minister and diplomat (born 1882).
- 18 August – Louis Renou, indologist (born 1896).
- 14 September – Alexandre Bioussa, rugby union player (born 1901).
- 21 September – Paul Reynaud, politician and lawyer (born 1878).
- 28 September – André Breton, writer, poet, and surrealist theorist (born 1896).

=== October to December ===
- 6 October – Pierre Couderc, screenwriter, actor, acrobat and film producer (born 1896).
- 8 October – Célestin Freinet, pedagogue, and educational reformer (born 1896).
- 10 October
  - Robert Desoille, psychotherapist (born 1890).
  - Louise Thuliez, resistance fighter in World War I and World War II (born 1881)
- 17 October – Cléo de Mérode, dancer (born 1875).
- 28 October – Robert Charpentier, cyclist and Olympic gold medallist (born 1916).

=== Full date unknown ===
- Charles Catteau, industrial designer (born 1880).
- Frédéric Justin Collet, pathologist and otolaryngologist (born 1870).
- Louis Couffignal, mathematician and cybernetics pioneer (born 1902).
- Edmond Locard, pioneer in forensic science (born 1877).

== See also ==
- List of French films of 1966
