= 1843 in France =

- Decades: 1820s; 1830s; 1840s; 1850s; 1860s
- See also: History of France; Timeline of French history; List of years in France

Events from the year 1843 in France.

== Incumbents ==
- Monarch – Louis Philippe I

== Events ==
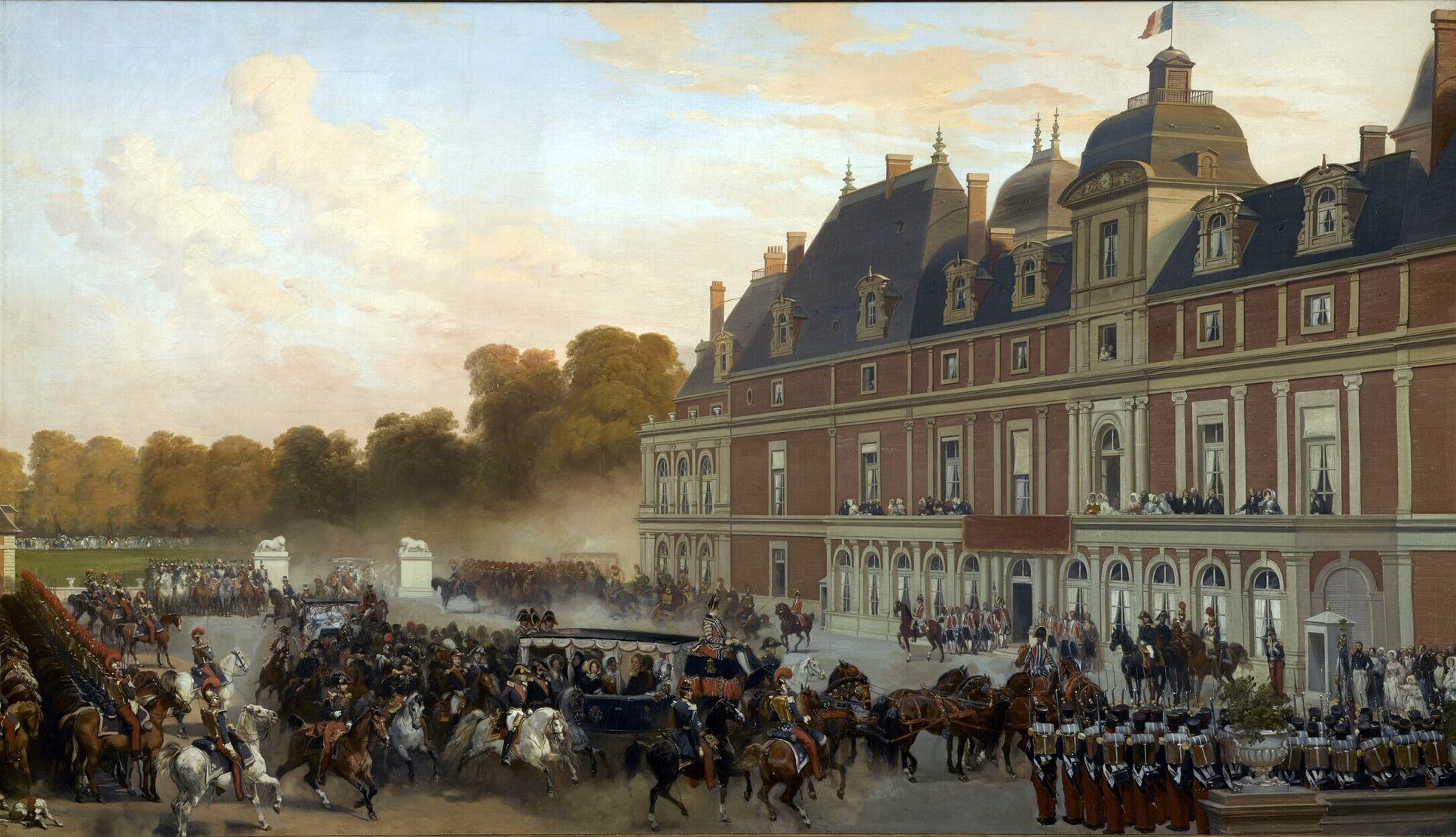
The Arrival of Queen Victoria at the Château d'Eu by Eugène Lami

- 16 May – French conquest of Algeria: Battle of the Smala - French troops led by Henri d'Orléans, duc d'Aumale, are victorious over Algerian forces led by Emir Abdelkader.
- 4 July – Sanwi, a traditional kingdom located in the south-east corner of modern-day Côte d'Ivoire, becomes a protectorate of Louis Philippe.
- 2 September – Queen Victoria of the United Kingdom arrives in Normandy to stay at the Château d'Eu with Louis Phillipe. It is the first formal visit to the country since Henry VIII at the Field of the Cloth of Gold

== Births ==
=== January to June ===
- 10 February – Philippe Alexandre Jules Künckel d'Herculais, entomologist (died 1918)
- 13 February – Célanie Carissan, composer, writer and pianist (died 1927)
- 14 February – Louis Diémer, pianist and composer (died 1919)
- 2 March – André Fernand Thesmar, enameler (died 1912)
- 5 March – Hugh Antoine d'Arcy, poet, writer and pioneer executive in the American motion picture industry (died 1925)
- 14 March – Leon Dehon, clergyman (died 1925)
- 29 March – Paul Ferrier, dramatist (died 1928)
- 21 May – Édouard-Henri Avril, painter and commercial artist (died 1928)
- 19 June – Charles-Edouard Lefebvre, composer (died 1917)
- 26 June – Paul Arène, poet and writer (died 1896)

=== July to December ===
- 13 July – Jean Marie Antoine de Lanessan, statesman and naturalist (died 1919)
- 17 August – Alexandre Lacassagne, physician and criminologist (died 1924)
- 29 August – Alfred Agache, painter (died 1915)
- 6 September – Yves Guyot, politician and economist (died 1928)
- 13 September – Louis Duchesne, priest, philologist, teacher and historian (died 1922)
- 21 September – Gabriel Paul Othenin de Cléron, comte d'Haussonville, politician and author (died 1924)
- 29 September – Jacques-Joseph Grancher, pediatrician (died 1907)
- 16 October – Émile Delahaye, automotive pioneer (died 1905)
- 12 December – Marcel Deprez, electrical engineer (died 1918)

=== Full date unknown ===
- Paul Adolphe Marie Prosper Granier de Cassagnac, journalist and politician (died 1904)

== Deaths ==
- 4 January – Hippolyte de Bouchard, sailor and corsair (b. c. 1780)
- 11 January – Antoine Bournonville, ballet dancer, actor, singer and choreographer (born 1760)
- 2 March – François-Joseph-Philippe de Riquet, nobleman (born 1771)
- 30 April – Gaspard de Chabrol, prefect of the Seine (born 1773)
- 24 May – Sylvestre François Lacroix, mathematician (born 1765)
- 7 June – Alexis Bouvard, astronomer (born 1767)
- 25 June – Marie Anne Lenormand, professional fortune-teller (born 1772)
- 12 August – Jean-Pierre Cortot, sculptor (born 1787)
- 4 September – Léopoldine Hugo, daughter of Victor Hugo (born 1824)
- 11 September – Joseph Nicollet, geographer and mathematician (born 1786)
- 19 September – Gaspard-Gustave Coriolis, mathematician, mechanical engineer and scientist (born 1792)
- 24 October – Antoine Berjon, painter and designer (born 1754)
- 11 December – Casimir Delavigne, poet and dramatist (born 1793)
- 26 December – Albert Gaspard Grimod, general and nobleman (born 1772)

=== Full date unknown ===
- Claude Louis Séraphin Barizain, actor (born 1783)
- Casimir, Comte de Montrond, diplomatic agent (born 1768)
- Auguste Defauconpret, writer and translator (born 1767)
- Pierre-Philippe Thomire, sculptor (born 1751)
