= 1842 in France =

- Decades: 1820s; 1830s; 1840s; 1850s; 1860s
- See also: History of France; Timeline of French history; List of years in France

Events from the year 1842 in France.

== Incumbents ==
- Monarch – Louis Philippe I

== Events ==
- 8 May – Versailles train crash at Meudon, results in the deaths of at least 55 passengers.
- 9 July – Legislative election held.

== Births ==
=== January to June ===
- 31 January – Marie-Charles David de Mayréna, adventurer (died 1890)
- 13 March – Joseph Valentin Boussinesq, mathematician and physicist (died 1929)
- 18 March – Stéphane Mallarmé, poet and critic (died 1898)
- 25 March – Jean Marie Charles Abadie, ophthalmologist (died 1932)
- 4 April – Édouard Lucas, mathematician (died 1891)
- 17 April – Maurice Rouvier, statesman (died 1911)
- 10 June – Jean-Jules-Antoine Lecomte du Nouy, painter and sculptor (died 1923)

=== July to December ===
- 30 July – Auguste Bouché-Leclercq, historian (died 1923)
- 14 August – Jean Gaston Darboux, mathematician (died 1917)
- 25 August – Édouard Louis Trouessart, zoologist (died 1927)
- 28 August – Placide Louis Chapelle, Archbishop in Roman Catholic Archdiocese of New Orleans (died 1905)
- 30 September – Auguste-René-Marie Dubourg, Archbishop of Rennes and Cardinal (died 1921)
- 6 October – Gustave Charles Fagniez, historian and economist (died 1927)
- 8 December – Alphonse Louis Nicolas Borrelly, astronomer (died 1926)

== Deaths ==
=== January to June ===
- 7 January – Charles Berny d'Ouvillé, miniaturist (born 1775)
- 19 January – Joseph Jérôme, Comte Siméon, jurist and politician (born 1749)
- 23 March – Stendhal, writer (born 1783)
- 30 March – Élisabeth-Louise Vigée-Le Brun, painter (born 1755)
- 8 May – Jules Dumont d'Urville, explorer and French Navy officer, and his wife Adèle, killed in Versailles rail accident (born 1790)
- 15 May – Emmanuel, comte de Las Cases, atlas-maker, member of Napoleon's entourage and member of the military (born 1766)
- 24 June – Jean-Baptiste Prosper Jollois, engineer (born 1776)

=== July to December ===
- 13 July – Ferdinand Philippe, Duke of Orléans, Prince Royal of France (born 1810)
- 19 July – Pierre Joseph Pelletier, chemist (born 1788)
- 25 July – Dominique Jean Larrey, military surgeon (born 1766)
- 20 October – Alexandre de Laborde, antiquary, liberal politician and writer (born 1773)
