= 1840 in France =

- Decades: 1820s; 1830s; 1840s; 1850s; 1860s
- See also: History of France; Timeline of French history; List of years in France

Events from the year 1840 in France.

== Incumbents ==
- Monarch – Louis Philippe I

== Events ==
- 1 January - Definitive adoption of the metric system and abandonment of the units of measurement of the Ancien Régime (which had been reinstated by Napoleon I on February 12, 1812, following their initial abolition on August 1, 1793), pursuant to the law of July 4, 1837.
- 15 January - General Bugeaud raises the issue of French policy in Algeria before the Chamber; in his view, the choice is between immediate evacuation or total occupation.
- 20 January - Dumont D'Urville discovers Adélie Land, Antarctica.
- 31 January - Auguste Blanqui is sentenced to death by the Court of Peers. The sentence is commuted to life imprisonment due to the Barbès precedent.
- 1 March - Adolphe Thiers becomes prime minister.
- 27 April – The Duke of Nemours, the second son of the king, marries Princess Victoria of Saxe-Coburg and Gotha at the Château de Saint-Cloud
- 30 September - The frigate Belle Poule arrives in Cherbourg-en-Cotentin, returning the remains of Napoleon from Saint Helena. He is buried in Les Invalides.
- 15 December – The Return of Napoleon is completed with a public procession in Paris before he is buried in Les Invalides.
- Metric system again mandatory across France.

== Arts and literature ==
- 11 February - Gaetano Donizetti's opera La Fille du Regiment premieres in Paris.

== Births ==
- 23 March -Louis-Émile Bertin, naval engineer (died 1924)
- 2 April - Émile Zola, novelist (died 1902)
- 22 April - Odilon Redon, painter and printmaker (died 1916)
- 13 May - Alphonse Daudet, novelist (died 1897)
- 20 October - Désiré-Magloire Bourneville, neurologist (died 1909)
- 12 November - Auguste Rodin, sculptor (died 1917)
- 14 November - Claude Monet, Impressionist painter (died 1926)
- 1 December - Marie Bracquemond, Impressionist painter (died 1916)

== Deaths ==
- 13 February - Nicolas Joseph Maison, Marshal of France and Minister of War (born 1770)
- 27 February - John Tessier, French Sulpician priest (born 1758)
- 22 March - Étienne Bobillier, mathematician (born 1798)
- 25 April - Siméon Denis Poisson, mathematician and physicist (born 1781)
- 7 June - Népomucène Lemercier, poet and dramatist (born 1771)
- 20 June - Pierre-Joseph Redouté, painter and botanist (born 1759)
- 7 September - Étienne-Jacques-Joseph-Alexandre MacDonald, Marshal of France (born 1765)
