= 1927 in France =

- Decades: 1900s; 1910s; 1920s; 1930s; 1940s
- See also: History of France; Timeline of French history; List of years in France

Events from the year 1927 in France.

== Incumbents ==
- President: Gaston Doumergue
- President of the Council of Ministers: Raymond Poincaré

== Events ==
- 20 May–21 May – First solo non-stop Trans-Atlantic flight from New York to Paris by Charles Lindbergh.
- 13 June – Léon Daudet, leader of French monarchists, is arrested after barricading himself into his house to avoid the police.
- 18 October – The Schwartzbard trial, relating to the murder of Symon Petliura, begins.

== Sport ==
- 19 June – Tour de France begins.
- 17 July – Tour de France ends, won by Nicolas Frantz of Luxembourg.

== Births ==
=== January to March ===
- 1 January – Maurice Béjart, choreographer who ran the Béjart Ballet Lausanne (died 2007)
- 7 February – Juliette Gréco, singer and actress (died 2020)
- 20 February – Hubert de Givenchy, aristocrat and fashion designer (died 2018)
- 23 February – Régine Crespin, opera singer (died 2007)
- 7 March – Philippe Clay, mime artist, singer and actor (died 2007)
- 19 March – Gisèle Lestrange, graphic artist (died 1991)
- 27 March – François Furet, historian (died 1997)

=== April to June ===
- 15 April – Maurice Ronet, actor, director and writer (died 1983)
- 25 April – Albert Uderzo, comic book artist and scriptwriter (died 2020)
- 3 May – Jean-Paul Martin-du-Gard, athlete (died 2017)
- 4 May – Jacques Lanzmann, writer, scriptwriter and lyric writer (died 2006)
- 18 May – François Nourissier, journalist and writer (died 2011)
- 24 May – Claude Abbes, international soccer player (died 2008)
- 20 June – Bernard Cahier, Formula One photo-journalist (died 2008)

=== July to September ===
- 3 July – Pierre Cahuzac, soccer player (died 2003)
- 13 July – Simone Veil, lawyer and politician (died 2017)
- 16 July – Serge Baudo, French conductor
- 17 July – Jean Casadesus, classical pianist (died 1972)
- 19 July – Hervé Pinoteau, historian and royalist apologist (died 2020)
- 23 July – Gérard Brach, film director and screenwriter (died 2006)
- 27 July – Pierre Granier-Deferre, film director (died 2007)
- 14 August – Roger Carel, actor and voice talent (died 2020)
- 7 September – François Billetdoux, playwright and novelist (died 1991)
- 13 September – Mathé Altéry, soprano and actress
- 13 September – Maurice Lafont, international soccer player (died 2005)

=== October to December ===
- 19 October – Jean Bastien-Thiry, attempted assassin of President Charles de Gaulle in 1962 (died 1963)
- 24 October -
  - Gilbert Bécaud, singer, composer and actor (died 2001)
  - Jean-Claude Pascal, costume designer and singer (died 1992)
- 18 November – Gérard Calvet, Roman Catholic abbot (died 2008)
- 1 December – Micheline Bernardini, dancer and model
- 9 December – Pierre Henry, musique concrète composer (died 2017)
- 25 December – Georges Besse, businessman (assassinated 1986)
- 30 December – Robert Hossein, actor (died 2020)

=== Full date unknown ===
- Claude Ponsard, economist (died 1990)

== Deaths ==
- 12 March – Léon Denis, spiritist philosopher and researcher (born 1846)
- 23 March – Paul César Helleu, artist (born 1859)
- 15 April – Gaston Leroux, journalist, detective and novelist (born 1868)
- 18 June – Gustave Charles Fagniez, historian and economist (born 1842)
- 30 June – Édouard Louis Trouessart, zoologist (born 1842)
- 10 July – Louise Abbéma, painter and designer (born 1853)
- 4 August – Eugène Atget, photographer (born 1857)
- 30 November – Célanie Carissan, composer, writer and pianist (born 1843)

== See also ==
- List of French films of 1927
