= 1839 in France =

- Decades: 1810s; 1820s; 1830s; 1840s; 1850s
- See also: History of France; Timeline of French history; List of years in France

Events from the year 1839 in France.

== Incumbents ==
- Monarch – Louis Philippe I

== Events ==
- 9 January – The French Academy of Sciences announces the Daguerreotype photography process.
- 2 March – Legislative election held.
- 12–13 May – Failed insurrection led by Louis Auguste Blanqui, Armand Barbès, Martin Bernard, and the Société des Saisons as part of the struggle for French worker's rights.
- 22 June – Louis Daguerre receives patent for his camera (commercially available by September with the prize of 400 Francs).
- 6 July – Legislative election held.
- 19 August – French government gives Louis Daguerre a pension and gives the daguerreotype "for the whole world".
- 15 October – Emir Abdelkader of Algeria declares a jihad against the French.

== Births ==
- 19 January – Paul Cézanne, painter (died 1906)
- 27 January – Marie Adolphe Carnot, chemist, mining engineer and politician (died 1920)
- 16 March – Sully Prudhomme, poet and essayist, winner of first Nobel Prize in Literature in 1901 (died 1907)
- 17 March – Louis Ricard, lawyer and politician (died 1921)
- 5 May – Louis Émile Javal, ophthalmologist (died 1907)
- 21 May – Joseph Albert Alexandre Glatigny, poet (died 1873)
- 9 August – Gaston Paris, writer and scholar (died 1903)
- 20 August – Gaston du Bousquet, steam locomotive engineer (died 1910)
- 9 October – Georges Leclanché, electrical engineer (died 1882)

=== Full date unknown ===
- Eugène Petit (1839–1886), flower painter and textile designer
- Albert Tissandier, architect, aviator, illustrator, editor and archaeologist (died 1906)

== Deaths ==
- 10 January – Charles Philippe Lafont, violinist and composer (born 1781)
- 2 March – Charlotte Napoléone Bonaparte, niece of Napoleon I (born 1802)
- 18 March – Victoire Babois, poet and writer of elegies (born 1760)
- 2 April – Toussaint-Bernard Éméric-David, archaeologist and writer on art (born 1755)
- 9 May – Joseph Fiévée, journalist, novelist, essayist and playwright (born 1767)
- 13 May – Hugues-Bernard Maret, duc de Bassano, statesman and journalist (born 1763)
- 19 July – Maurice de Guérin, poet (born 1810)
- 30 September – Joseph François Michaud, historian and publicist (born 1767)
- 26 December – Laurent Jean François Truguet, admiral (born 1752)
- 31 December – Hyacinthe-Louis de Quelen, Archbishop of Paris (born 1778)
