= 1841 in France =

- Decades: 1820s; 1830s; 1840s; 1850s; 1860s
- See also: History of France; Timeline of French history; List of years in France

Events from the year 1841 in France.

== Incumbents ==
- Monarch – Louis Philippe I

== Events ==
- 22 February - Thomas Robert Bugeaud takes office in French Algeria as Governor-General of the French Possessions in Africa.
- 25 February - Circular from the Minister of Finances Georges Humann to prefects requiring a general census of property in every commune for a door and window tax. This leads to criticism in the press and unrest in cities across the country from 7 July to 10 September.
- 22 March - Law on regulation of working conditions for children ages 8 to 16, prohibiting under-8s from employment.
- 3 April - Allocation of funds for construction of the Thiers wall, last of the city walls of Paris.
- 25 April - The Indian Ocean island territory of Mayotte is sold by its last sultan to France.
- 28 June - The ballet Giselle is first presented by the Ballet du Théâtre de l'Académie Royale de Musique, at the Salle Le Peletier in Paris, with music by Adolphe Adam and Italian ballerina Carlotta Grisi in the title rôle.
- 7 July - Opening of the railway from Bordeaux to La Teste.
- 10 September - Unrest over the tax census in Clermont-Ferrand leads to fatalities.
- 11–18 September - Unrest in Paris.
- 19 September - Inauguration of the first international railway line, between Strasbourg (France) and Basel (Switzerland).
- Undated
  - The first comprehensive geological map of France is published by Dufrénoy and Élie de Beaumont, the result of 13 years of investigations.
  - Uranium is first isolated, by Eugène-Melchior Péligot.

== Births ==
- 7 January - Bernadette Soubirous, reported apparitions at Lourdes (died 1879)
- 14 January - Berthe Morisot, Impressionist painter (died 1895)
- 18 January - Emmanuel Chabrier, composer (died 1894)
- 30 January - Félix Faure, President of France (died 1899)
- 25 February - Pierre-Auguste Renoir, Impressionist painter (died 1919)
- 28 February - Jean Mounet-Sully, actor (died 1916)
- 2 April - Clément Ader, engineer and aviation pioneer (died 1925)
- 13 April - Louis-Ernest Barrias, sculptor (died 1905)
- 28 September - Georges Clemenceau, statesman, physician, journalist and Prime Minister (died 1929)
- 6 November - Armand Fallières, politician and President of France (died 1931)
- 12 November - Charles Jean Baptiste Collin-Mezin, luthier (died 1923)
- 6 December - Frédéric Bazille, Impressionist painter (died 1870)
- 20 December - Ferdinand Buisson, academic, pacifist, politician, awarded Nobel Peace Prize in 1927 (died 1932)

== Deaths ==
- 6 January - Louis Pierre Édouard, Baron Bignon, diplomat and historian (born 1771)
- 13 January - Bertrand Barère de Vieuzac, politician and journalist (born 1755)
- 23 February - Louis Nicolas Philippe Auguste de Forbin, painter and antiquary (born 1779)
- 1 March - Claude Victor-Perrin, Duc de Belluno, Marshal of France (born 1764)
- 28 April - Peter Chanel, priest, missionary, martyr and saint (born 1803)
- 16 May - Marie Boivin, obstetrician (born 1773)
- 1 June - Nicolas Appert, confectioner, inventor of airtight food preservation (born 1749)
- 23 June - Étienne Joseph Louis Garnier-Pagès, politician (born 1801)
- 2 August - Étienne Félix d'Henin de Cuvillers, practitioner of mesmerism as a scientific discipline (born 1755)
- 15 August - François-Honoré-Georges Jacob-Desmalter, furniture maker (born 1770)
- 9 November - Jean Victoire Audouin, naturalist, entomologist and ornithologist (born 1797)
- 11 November - Alexandre-Hyacinthe Dunouy, landscape painter (born 1757)
