= 1924 in France =

- Decades: 1900s; 1910s; 1920s; 1930s; 1940s
- See also: History of France; Timeline of French history; List of years in France

Events from the year 1924 in France.

== Incumbents ==
- President: Alexandre Millerand (until 13 June), Gaston Doumergue (starting 13 June)
- President of the Council of Ministers:
  - until 8 June: Raymond Poincaré
  - 8 June-15 June: Frédéric François-Marsal
  - starting 15 June: Édouard Herriot

== Events ==
- 28 March – Total S.A. established as Compagnie française des pétroles.
- 29 March – Third Ministry of Raymond Poincaré starts.
- 27 April – Group of Alawites kill some Christian nuns in Syria; French troops march against them.
- 11 May – Legislative Election held.
- 25 May – Legislative Election held.
- 18 August – France begins to withdraw its troops from Germany.

== Sport ==
- 25 January–4 February – The 1924 Winter Olympics open in Chamonix (in the French Alps), inaugurating the Winter Olympic Games.
- 4 May–27 July – The 1924 Summer Olympics are held in Paris.
- 22 June – Tour de France begins.
- 20 July – Tour de France ends, won by Ottavio Bottecchia of Italy.
- 10–17 August – The 1924 Summer Deaflympics take place in Paris.

== Births ==
=== January to June ===
- 10 January – Pierre Plateau, Roman Catholic prelate (died 2018)
- 11 January – Roger Guillemin, neuroendocrinologist, awarded Nobel Prize for medicine in 1977 (died 2024)
- 13 January – Raymond Hermantier, actor (died 2005)
- 16 January – Henri-Jean Martin, historian of the book and printing (died 2007)
- 19 January – Jean-François Revel, politician, journalist, author and philosopher (died 2006).
- 23 January – Pierre Lacoste, admiral (died 2020)
- 13 February – Jean-Jacques Servan-Schreiber, journalist and politician (died 2006)
- 20 February – Laurent Dauthuille, boxer (died 1971)
- 23 February – Claude Sautet, author and film director (died 2000)
- 5 March – Roger Marche, international soccer player (died 1997)
- 13 March – Pierre Arpaillange, French author, senior judge and Government Minister (died 2017)
- 7 April
  - André du Bouchet, poet (died 2001)
  - Daniel Emilfork, actor (died 2006)
- 12 April – Raymond Barre, politician and economist, Prime Minister (died 2007)
- 29 April
  - Annette Chalut, Resistance worker and doctor (died 2021)
  - Zizi Jeanmaire, ballerina, actress and singer (died 2020)
- 7 May – Marcel Moussy, screenwriter and television director (died 1995)
- 17 May – Marie-Thérèse Cheroutre, historian and professor of philosophy (died 2020)
- 22 May
  - Charles Aznavour, singer-songwriter and actor (died 2018)
  - Claude Ballif, composer (died 2004)
- 12 June – Jacques Pras, cyclist (died 1982)
- 15 June – Paul Amargier, historian and Catholic priest (died 2021)

=== July to September ===
- 1 July – Georges Rivière, French actor (died unknown)
- 9 July – Pierre Cochereau, organist and composer (died 1984)
- 17 July – Françoise Adnet, painter (died 2014)
- 7 August – Georges Lévis, comic artist (died 1988)
- 8 August – Edouard Jaguer, poet and art critic (died 2006)
- 10 August – Jean-François Lyotard, philosopher and literary theorist (died 1998)
- 13 August – Josette Arène, swimmer (died 2019)
- 14 August – Georges Prêtre, conductor (died 2017)
- 17 August – Jean-Paul Alata, political prisoner (died 1978)
- 23 August – Madeleine Riffaud, Resistance member, journalist and writer (died 2024)
- 29 August – Guy Deplus, clarinetist (died 2020)
- 11 September – Louis Hon, soccer player (died 2008)
- 18 September – Antonin Rolland, road cycling racer
- 19 September – Jacques Lusseyran, author (died 1971)

=== October to December ===
- 2 October – Gilbert Simondon, philosopher (died 1989)
- 27 October – Alain Bombard, biologist, physician, politician and sailor (died 2005)
- 30 October – Hubert Curien, physicist (died 2005)
- 5 November – Alice Colonieu, artist (died 2000)
- 20 November – Michael Riffaterre, literary critic and theorist (died 2006).
- 26 November – Fernand Cazenave, international rugby union player and coach (died 2005)
- 13 December – Pierre Flamion, soccer player and manager (died 2004)

=== Full date unknown ===
- Michel Alaux, fencing master and Olympic gold medallist (died 1974)

== Deaths ==
- 24 January – Auguste-Louis-Albéric, prince d'Arenberg, noble and politician (born 1837)
- 17 March – Victor Besaucèle, ornithologist (born 1847)
- 14 April – Roland Bonaparte, prince, president of the Société de Géographie (born 1858)
- 24 April – Ferdinand Arnodin, engineer and industrialist (born 1845)
- 15 May – Paul-Henri-Benjamin d'Estournelles de Constant, diplomat and politician, recipient of the Nobel Peace Prize (born 1852)
- 11 June – Théodore Dubois, composer and organist (born 1837)
- 1 September – Gabriel Paul Othenin de Cléron, comte d'Haussonville, politician and author (born 1843)
- 21 September – Edouard Deville, first to perfect a practical method of photogrammetry (born 1849)
- 24 September – Alexandre Lacassagne, physician and criminologist (born 1843)
- 12 October – Anatole France, author, awarded Nobel Prize for Literature in 1921 (born 1844)
- 22 October – Louis-Émile Bertin, naval engineer (born 1840)
- 23 October – Marguerite de Witt-Schlumberger, feminist campaigner (born 1853)
- 4 November – Gabriel Fauré, composer, organist and pianist (born 1845)

=== Full date unknown ===
- Jean Pierre Philippe Lampué, photographer (born 1836)

== See also ==
- List of French films of 1924
