= Auguste Raffet =

French painter

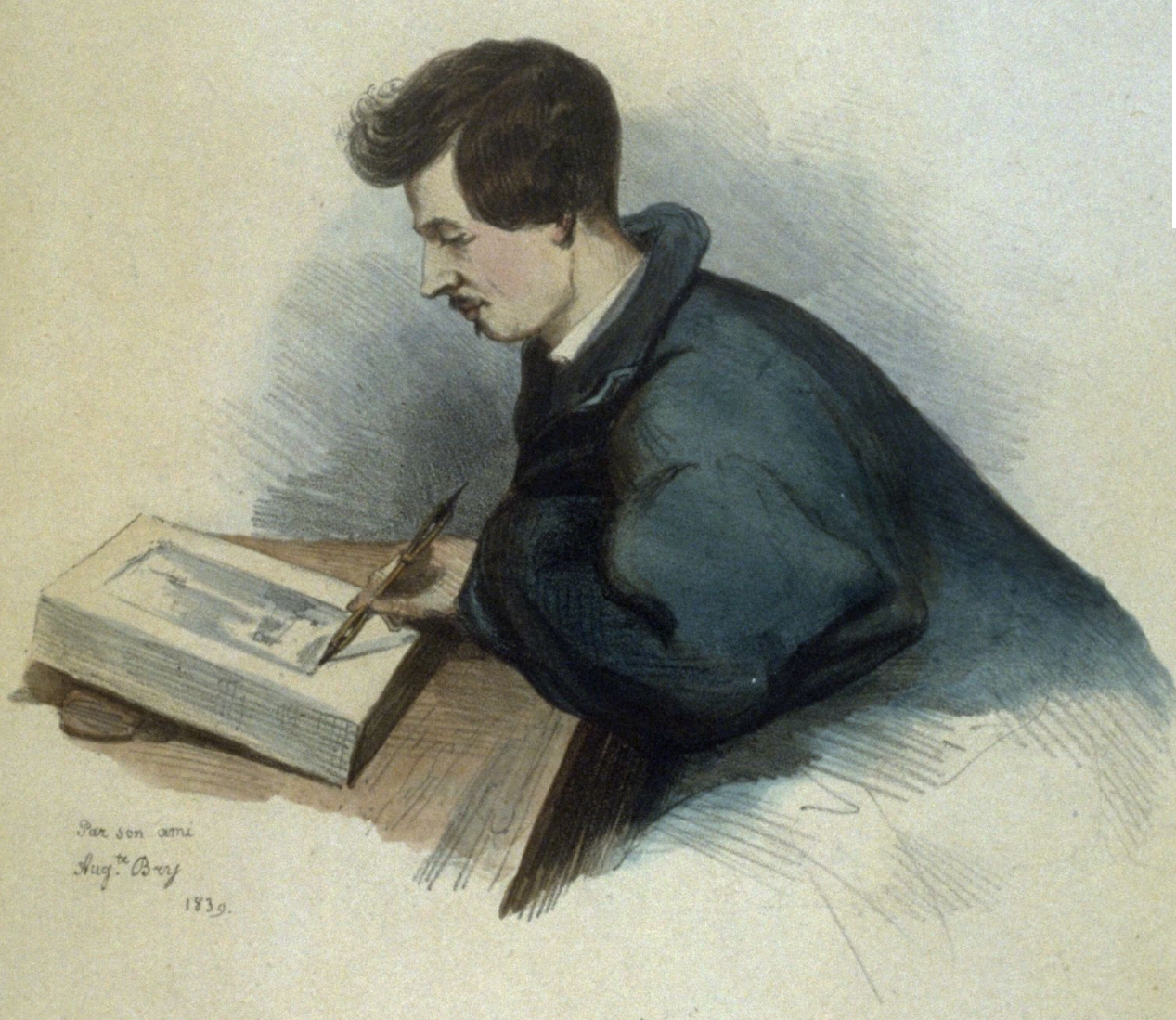
Denis Auguste Marie Raffet, portrait by Auguste Bry

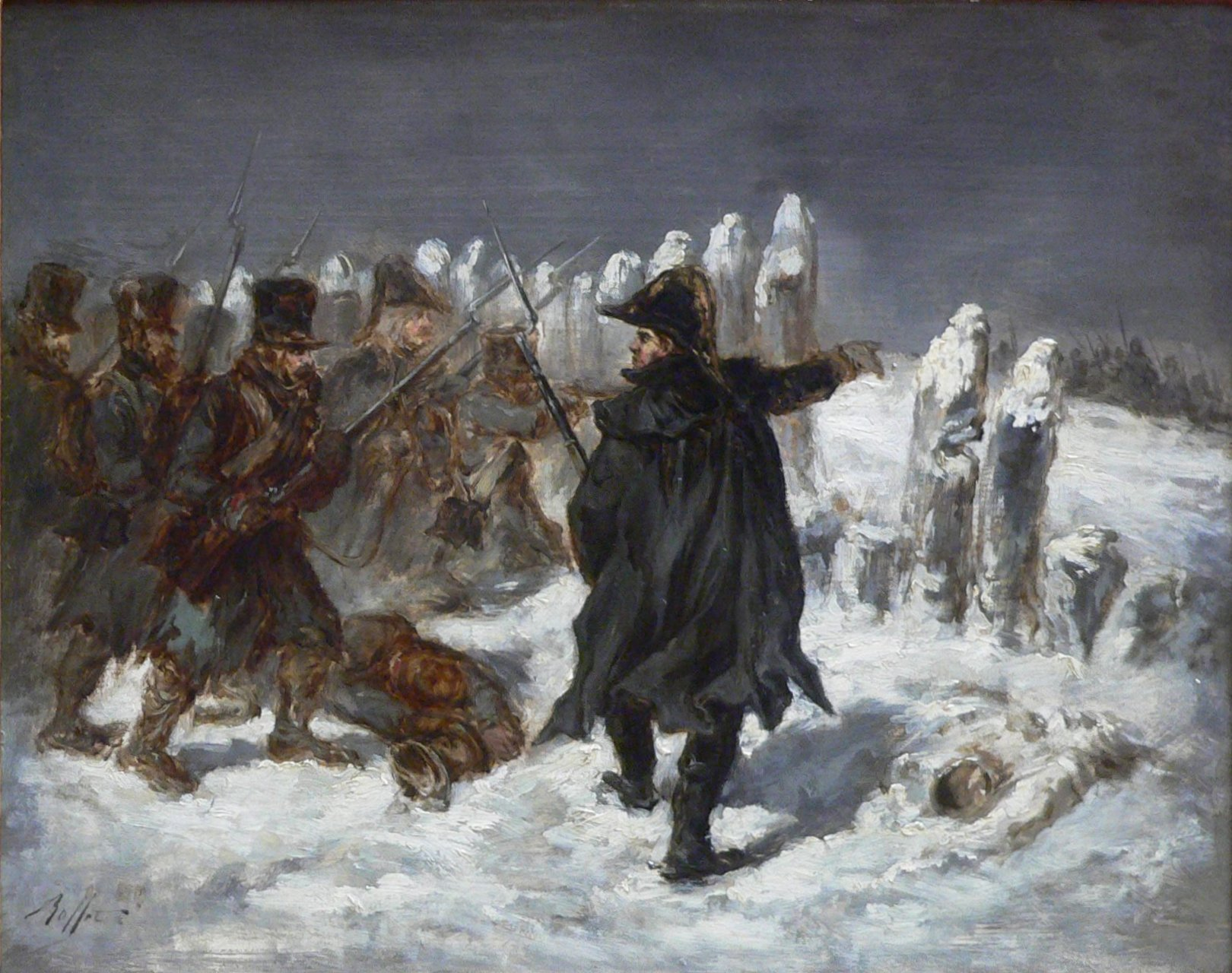
Marshal Ney at the Kowno Redoubt by Raffet

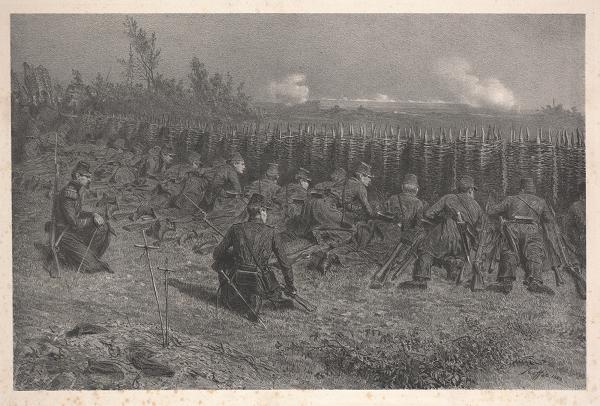
Sape Volante, 1853, Dallas Museum of Art

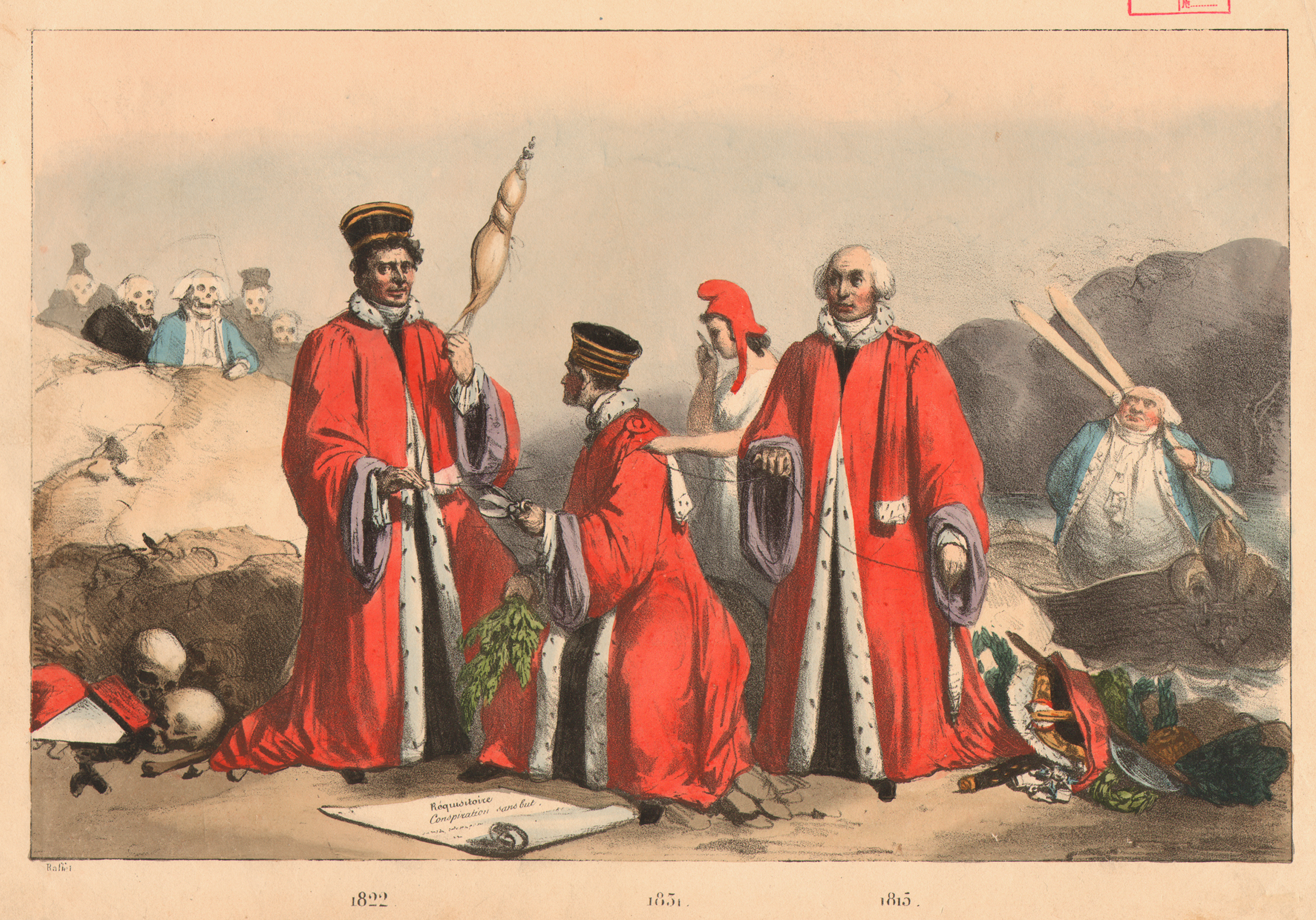
Crown Prosecution, 1831, lithograph, watercolor

Denis Auguste Marie Raffet (French: [oɡyst ʁafɛ]; 2 March 1804 – 16 February 1860) was a French illustrator and lithographer. He was a student of Nicolas Toussaint Charlet, and was a retrospective painter of the Empire.

== Biography ==
Raffet was born in Paris.

At an early age he was apprenticed to a wood turner, but took up the study of art at evening classes. At the age of 18 he entered the workshop of Cabanel, where he applied his skill to the decoration of china, and where he met Rudor, from whom he received instruction in lithography, in the practice of which he was to rise to fame. He then entered the École des Beaux-Arts, but returned to lithography in 1830 when he produced on stone his famous designs of Lützen, Waterloo, Le bal, La revue, and Les adieux de la garrison, by which his reputation became immediately established.

Raffet's chief works were his lithographs of the Napoleonic campaigns, from Egypt to Waterloo, vigorous designs inspired by ardent patriotic enthusiasm. In this endeavour he was a contemporary of other French artist-lithographers of Napoleon and the French army including Hippolyte Bellangé, Horace Vernet, and Nicolas Toussaint Charlet. As an illustrator his activity was prodigious, the list of works illustrated by his crayon amounting to about forty-five, among which are Béranger's poems, the History of the Revolution by Adolphe Thiers, the History of Napoleon by de Norvins, the great Walter Scott by Auguste Defauconpret, the French Plutarch and Frédéric Bérat's Songs.

He went to Rome in 1849, was present at the siege of Rome, which he made the subject of some lithographs, and followed the Italian campaign of 1859, of which he left a record in his Episodes de la campagne d'Italie de 1859. His portraits in pencil and water-colour are full of character. He died at Genoa in 1860. In 1893 a monument by Emmanuel Frémiet was unveiled in the Jardin de l'Infante at the Louvre, Paris. The statue was removed and melted down during the nazi occupation of Paris.

== Works ==
- Anatolīĭ Demidov (principe di San Donato), André Durand, Denis Auguste Marie Raffet: Voyage pittoresque et archéologique en Russie par le Hâvre, Hambourg, Lubeck, Saint-Petersbourg, Moscou, Nijni-Novgorod, Yaroslaw et Kasan, exécutée en 1839 sous la direction de M. Anatole de Démidoff. Paris, Gihaut frères, [1840–1848]
- Marquet de Montbreton de Norvins, Jacques, Baron – Histoire de Napoleon. – Paris, 1827–28 – 4 vols. Illustrated by Raffet and Vernet.
