= 1838 in France =

- Decades: 1810s; 1820s; 1830s; 1840s; 1850s
- See also: History of France; Timeline of French history; List of years in France

Events from the year 1838 in France.

== Incumbents ==
- Monarch – Louis Philippe I

== Events ==
- 27 November - Pastry War begins when the French fleet begins a blockade and attack on Mexico in support of a claim for supposed damages owing to a French pastry cook from earlier unrest in the country.
- Badoit mineral water from Saint-Galmier is first bottled.

== Births ==
- 4 March - Paul Lacôme, composer (died 1920)
- 2 April - Léon Gambetta, statesman (died 1882)
- 20 May - Jules Méline, statesman, Prime Minister (died 1925)
- 25 October - Georges Bizet, composer and pianist (died 1875)
- 7 November - Auguste Villiers de l'Isle-Adam, writer (died 1889)
- 31 December - Émile Loubet, politician and 7th President of France (died 1929)

== Deaths ==
- 21 February - Silvestre de Sacy, linguist and orientalist (born 1758)
- 28 February - Charles Thévenin, painter (born 1764)
- 17 May - Charles Maurice de Talleyrand-Périgord, politician and diplomat (born 1754)
- 29 September - Pierre-Dominique Bazaine, scientist and engineer (born 1786)
- 8 October - Prosper Garnot, surgeon and naturalist (born 1794)
- 21 November - Georges Mouton, Marshal of France and political figure (born 1770)
- 20 December - Hégésippe Moreau, poet (born 1810)
