= 1922 in France =

- Decades: 1900s; 1910s; 1920s; 1930s; 1940s
- See also: History of France; Timeline of French history; List of years in France

Events from the year 1922 in France.

== Incumbents ==
- President: Alexandre Millerand
- President of the Council of Ministers: Aristide Briand (until 15 January), Raymond Poincaré (starting 15 January)

== Events ==
The year 1922 was signalized at its opening by the conference of Cannes, between France, the United Kingdom, and Belgium, which met to consider the situation created by Germany's declaration of her inability to pay what was demanded of her for 1922. The chief result of this conference was a decision to hold a general European conference at Genoa, and Aristide Briand, the French premier, signed with the British prime minister, David Lloyd George, a draft pact of guarantee which stated that "guarantees for the security of France against a future invasion by Germany are indispensable to the restoration of stability in Europe, to the security of Great Britain, and the peace of the world."

At Paris, however, the political atmosphere had become hostile to Briand, who, finding that he had not the support of Parliament, resigned from the premiership at a memorable sitting on 12 January. After a very brief crisis Raymond Poincaré presented himself before Parliament with a new cabinet containing several members of the previous one.

Premier and Foreign Minister	Raymond Poincaré
Justice and Vice-Premier	Louis Barthou*
Interior	Maurice Maunoury
War and Pensions	André Maginot*
Finance	Charles de Lasteyrie
Education	Léon Bérard*
Public Works	Yves Le Trocquer*
Commerce	Lucien Dior
Agriculture	Henry Chéron
Labour	Alexandre Bérard
Colonies	Albert Sarraut*
Navy	Flaminius Raiberti
Liberated Regions	Charles Reibel
* Members of outgoing Briand cabinet.

In his ministerial address, Poincaré said bluntly that France would defend her interests as her Allies defended theirs, and he criticized adversely the conferences of the Supreme Council. His tone was aggressive, but at the same time perfectly courteous.

The old cabinet was not allowed to disappear in peace. Briand, its head, was specially marked out for attack. A report of his ineptitude while at Washington was made the most of in order to discredit him. But his unpopularity reached its height when it leaked out that at Cannes Briand, against the advice of the War Ministry, had given instructions for French war material to be handed over to the Kemalists.

The advent to power of Poincaré caused a distinct change in Franco-British relations. Poincaré did not like conferences. He preferred the old diplomatic method by which the heads of governments did not meet until everything had been discussed and put in order by the ambassadors.

In spite, however, of his avowed objections, Poincaré could not avoid the participation of France in the conference of Genoa, which had been fixed for early in March. In a memorandum sent to the British government on 6 February, Poincaré criticized severely the programme laid down at Cannes for the conference of Genoa. This document emphasized two points: first, that the treaties drawn up by the peace conference were not to be modified in any particular; secondly, that the power and the authority of the League of Nations should not be derogated from in any way, and that its place should not be usurped by the conference of Genoa in dealing with any of the questions which came within its competence. About a fortnight after the publication of this memorandum, Lloyd George and Poincaré met at Boulogne (25 February) and agreed that at Genoa no discussion should be admitted either of the Treaty of Versailles and its annexes or of reparations. Briand had already obtained a similar assurance at Cannes.

The conference of Genoa actually opened on 15 April, almost a month and a half after the date originally fixed. Whereas all the other powers were represented by their prime ministers, Poincaré remained in Paris. The French representatives were, however, men of the highest standing – Barthou, Colrat, Barrère, Seydoux, Picard, and experts of the first rank.

France's position at the conference was difficult. In regard to Russia she was torn between the desire of defending Europe against the "menace of Bolshevism", a movement that seemed repugnant to French tradition, and the fear of finding herself left behind in the struggle for concessions in Russia, where she had such important interests. In regard to reparations, again, she found herself in danger of becoming isolated on the question of the enforcement of the Treaty of Versailles. At that time France could not think without anxiety of a rupture which would leave her to assert her rights alone. Her financial situation was bad. Her industry was suffering. The Chamber had adopted the principle of military service for eighteen months, and France was accused of imperialism by those who did not see that it was only the non-execution of the Treaty of Versailles which compelled her to preserve intact her defensive force.

The conference could not agree on the guarantees to be demanded of the Russians, and the memorandum presented to them did not bear the signatures of France and Belgium. France was accused of desiring to checkmate at all costs the agreement, and some bitter words were exchanged. But calm was restored before the conference ended on 19 May. One result of the conference was to show, as Poincaré had foreseen, the irreconcilable opposition between the Soviets and the Western nations. Another result, of particular value to France, was to demonstrate the necessity of Anglo-French agreement, and to cement the alliance still further.

France at Genoa had held her own; she had neither gained nor lost anything. In regard to Russia, she had abandoned none of her claims as a creditor, and in regard to Europe, she remained the champion of the imprescriptible and sacred right of private property. But no solution had been found of the reparations problem. Would such a solution be forthcoming at the Hague conference, which had been decided on as a continuation of Genoa?

The attitude of Germany at the conference of Genoa had been regarded as satisfactory. France had had no need to exercise her right of sanction. Germany seemed willing to accept financial control, and also to impose fresh taxes. It was possible to hope that the conference of bankers which met at Paris in May to study the question of an international loan might really be successful.

The Hague conference commenced in June, and was attended by France, which found itself almost completely in accord with the British government. In order to meet the wishes of France, England consented that the holders of Russian bonds should be invited to participate in the labours of the conference in order to see if they could not come to an understanding directly with the Soviet government. In regard to war debts, the British government repeated that it was willing to annul part of its Russian claim, and this statement obviously opened up the much larger question of all the inter-Allied debts.

The international committee of bankers mentioned above had adjourned (10 June) after laying down as a condition of its assistance that the finances of Germany should be restored and that the uncertainty regarding the extent of reparations should be removed. The representative of France had refused to sign this statement, insisting that no reduction of the figure of reparations could be considered until some arrangement had been made among the Allies by which France herself should be relieved of part of her debt to England and the United States.

In home affairs, Parliament finally passed the eighteen months' service bill. The commercial difficulties with Spain were settled. The Poincaré ministry, though often assailed, remained unshaken. A new scheme of secondary education was introduced by the minister of education, Léon Bérard. The Poincaré cabinet also made efforts to refloat the Banque Industrielle de Chine. This matter raised storms of controversy in France and was utilized by the political parties as a weapon with which to vilify each other. One result of the affair was the suspension for ten years of Philippe Berthelot, the secretary general of the Foreign Office.

In the middle of May the cantonal elections took place and the results tended to show that there had been a slight movement away from the Right. Some of the anti-government candidates at these elections were supported by the local prefects, and a cry was raised against the political activity of public officials, including secondary school teachers and post office employees who adhered to Communism. The government was blamed for not taking serious steps to remove guilty officials. Whether public clamour was becoming too loud, or whether the government desired to make an example, two Communist deputies, Marcel Cachin and Vaillant Couturier, were tried on 29 July for being concerned in the publication of an article inciting soldiers to disobedience, and were condemned to pay a fine of 500 francs each. Nor was this the only trouble of its kind with which the government had to deal. A prolonged strike of metal workers at Le Havre became so serious that on 26 August the military had to be called out and several casualties ensued. The strike did not end until 9 October, after lasting 110 days, the men returning to work on terms imposed by their employers. The Communists were blamed for the strike. But the Communists had been in bad odour ever since 14 July when, on the occasion of the Fête National, a young Communist attempted to shoot the president of the republic but missed his mark.

The financial situation was a source of very grave anxiety. The deficit amounted to 4 milliards of francs, despite the yield from taxes, direct and indirect, being much larger than in 1921. The public was alarmed to see no solution proposed except to resort to economies which were not always in the best interests of the state, and to impose taxes which might prove insupportable. It was irritated by seeing the sympathy of the world directed rather to Germany and Russia than to its own embarrassments. The decision for which it waited never seemed to arrive.

The Hague conference had had no other result than to confirm the opinion formed at Genoa, of the impossibility of coming to an accord with the Soviets. Whatever the world may think, France had really sought, both at Genoa and The Hague, to bring Russia back into the comity of nations. But the time was not yet ripe.

Meanwhile, the Chamber appeared not to be disposed to ratify the Washington naval agreements. The government did indeed produce a ratification bill, but it was a long time in committee, and had not reached the full house by the end of the year.

Mention should also be made of the scheme for railway development, including the electrification of the French railways, brought forward during the year by Yves Le Trocquer, minister of public works.

France during the year watched with very close concern developments in the Near East. She did not cease to instil into Mustafa Kemal counsels of moderation, while by sending Henry Franklin-Bouillon to Angora she gave confidence to the Turks. After the Turkish victory over the Greeks, France withdrew her troops to guard against the possibility of serious incidents. She then awaited the decision of the conference of Lausanne on the question of peace with Turkey and the freedom of the Straits.

In Syria, France has reduced her troops to an absolute minimum. The civil credits for 1922 amounted to 50 million francs, but they were soon to be reduced very considerably. There was every reason to expect that before long Syria would cost France next to nothing, at any rate in comparison with the financial sacrifices hitherto made.

The colonial policy of France, under the direction of Albert Sarraut, has been highly successful in 1922, both in Madagascar, in Indochina, and elsewhere. During the year Sarraut at his own expense paid a visit to Martinique, to see what improvements could be effected in those regions. But it is in North Africa that the work of France has been particularly noteworthy. While the conference of Genoa was sitting, Alexandre Millerand, president of the republic, made a tour through Morocco, Algiers, and Tunis. Everywhere he was welcomed with great enthusiasm. The theme of all his speeches was that the future of North Africa lay in the closest possible cooperation of the native Arabs and Berbers with the French soldiers, administrators, and colonists. In Tunis, Millerand warned the people against a certain pan-Islamic agitation which has been on foot there for some time, and consulted with Lucien Saint, the resident-general, on suggested reforms in the administration. In Morocco Millerand was struck by the prestige and authority which Marshal Hubert Lyautey had managed to preserve for the person and the office of the sultan, and his success in maintaining a native government which was respected side by side with a protecting power which was obeyed. Millerand said: "France can be proud of its African domain. ... She has not come to enslave. ... The Mohammedan world can have confidence in her, and hand in hand with her aspire to a glorious future."

The last weeks of 1922 brought into view more clearly than ever the default of Germany in the matter of reparations. In spite of various interviews between ministers and the journey of Poincaré to London, no solution was discovered. On 21 December Poincaré again defined his policy in a speech in the Senate which was unanimously approved of. Repeating his formula: "No moratorium without guarantees", he reminded the Germans that they still possessed their immovable goods, their coal, their customs, and other sources of wealth and revenue. "We want these goods", he proceeded, "and others which you have, to serve as guarantees for your unpaid debts, and also as means for bringing pressure to bear on your great manufacturers, I mean those persons who are acquiring great wealth in Germany at the expense of the people itself." Thus Poincaré drew a clear distinction between the German masses and the privileged few who were exploiting them. What France desired, he went on, was that Germany should free herself as quickly as possible, the payment of reparations by instalments extending over a long period of time being full of grave inconveniences. "It is desirable, therefore, that Germany should clear herself of her debt by successive payments of lump sums, instead of yearly mites, and for this purpose should procure money from abroad." This did not mean, however, that the regulation of reparations should be put in the hands of bankers; it should remain as hitherto with the governments concerned and the Reparations Commission. With regard to the inter-Allied debts, Poincaré once more stated the French point of view: "A large part of France's war expenses is represented by its debt to England and the United States; it cannot be asked to repay these countries before it has itself been indemnified for its losses." Referring finally to relations between France and England, Poincaré expressed the hope that these would continue to be as cordial as heretofore, even should the two countries find themselves obliged to differ on any point.

== Timeline ==
- 6 February – Washington Naval Treaty is signed by United States, Britain, Japan, France and Italy.
- 25 February – Serial killer Henri Désiré Landru is beheaded by the guillotine at Versailles.
- 7 April – 1922 Picardie mid-air collision: World's first midair collision, between a Daimler Airway de Havilland DH.18 and a Compagnie des Grands Express Aériens Farman Goliath over Poix-de-Picardie, Amiens.
- 1 August – Two trains carrying pilgrims from Moulins to Lourdes collide at Miélan killing at least 33.
- 11 October – Armistice of Mudanya is signed with Turkey.

== Arts and literature ==
- 2 February – James Joyce's novel Ulysses is published in Paris by Sylvia Beach.
- 6 November – Privately owned radio station Radiola begins regular transmissions.
- 18 November – Marcel Proust, author of the In Search of Lost Time (À la recherche du temps perdu) novel sequence, dies of pneumonia and a pulmonary abscess age 51 in Paris.

== Sport ==
- 25 June – Tour de France begins.
- 23 July – Tour de France ends, won by Firmin Lambot of Belgium.

== Births ==
=== January to March ===
- 4 January – Marceau Somerlinck, soccer player (died 2005)
- 7 January – Jean-Pierre Rampal, flautist (died 2000)
- 10 January – Michel Henry, philosopher and novelist (died 2002)
- 13 January
  - Jean-Marie Domenach, writer and intellectual (died 1997)
  - Albert Lamorisse, filmmaker, producer and writer (died 1970)
- 14 February – Pierre Ghestem, bridge and checkers player (died 2000)
- 21 February – Colette Brosset, actress, writer and choreographer (died 2007)
- 27 March – Stefan Wul, writer (died 2003)

=== April to June ===
- 4 April – Armand Jammot, television producer (died 1998)
- 11 April – Antoine Blondin, writer (died 1991)
- 16 April – Boby Lapointe, singer (died 1972)
- 17 May – Jean Rédélé, automotive pioneer, pilot and founder of automotive brand Alpine (died 2007)
- 29 May – Jacques Morel, actor (died 2008)
- 13 June – Maurice Diot, cyclist (died 1972)
- 18 June – Henri Chopin, avant-garde poet and musician (died 2008)
- 18 June – Claude Helffer, pianist (died 2004)

=== July to December ===
- 2 July
  - Pierre Cardin, Italian-born fashion designer (died 2020)
  - Jacques Pollet, motor racing driver (died 1997)
- 18 July – Jean de Gribaldy, cyclist and directeur sportif (died 1987)
- 10 August – Paul Gégauff, screenwriter, actor and director (died 1983)
- 18 August – Alain Robbe-Grillet, writer and filmmaker (died 2008)
- 22 August – Micheline Presle, actress (died 2024)
- 23 August – Roland Dumas, lawyer and politician (died 2024)
- 6 September – Louis Alexandre Raimon, hair stylist (died 2008)
- 9 September – Solange Alexandre, resistance fighter and teacher (died 2026)
- 16 September – Marcel Mouloudji, singer and actor (died 1994)
- 25 September – Roger Etchegaray, cardinal (died 2019)
- 27 October
  - Michel Galabru, actor (died 2016)
  - Léon Gautier, soldier, last French survivor of D-Day (died 2023)
- 9 November – Raymond Devos, humorist, comedian and clown (died 2006)
- 25 November – Gloria Lasso, singer (died 2005)
- 12 December – Maritie Carpentier, television producer (died 2002)
- 13 December – Robert Veyron-Lacroix, harpsichordist and pianist (died 1991)
- 23 December – Micheline Ostermeyer, athlete and pianist (died 2001)
- 24 December – Serge Mouille, industrial designer and goldsmith (died 1988)

=== Full date unknown ===
- Jean Desclaux, rugby union coach (died 2006)
- Henri Jayer, vintner (died 2006)

== Deaths ==
- 16 January – Henri Brocard, meteorologist and mathematician (born 1845)
- 21 January – Pierre Giffard, journalist and publisher (born 1853)
- 22 January – Camille Jordan, mathematician (born 1838)
- 10 February – Paul Mounet, actor (born 1847)
- 25 February – Henri Désiré Landru, serial killer (executed) (born 1869)
- 26 February – Léon Levavasseur, engineer, aircraft designer and inventor (born 1863)
- 22 March – Louis-Antoine Ranvier, physician, pathologist, anatomist and histologist (born 1835)
- 21 April – Louis Duchesne, priest, philologist, teacher and historian (born 1843)
- 18 May – Charles Louis Alphonse Laveran, physician, awarded 1907 Nobel Prize for Physiology or Medicine (born 1845)
- 21 July – Eugène Vallin, furniture designer and manufacturer (born 1856)
- 5 September
  - Georgette Agutte, painter (born 1867)
  - Marcel Sembat, politician (born 1862)
- 1 November – Alfred Capus, journalist and playwright (born 1858)
- 18 November – Marcel Proust, novelist, essayist and critic (born 1871)
- 30 November – René Cresté, actor and director (born 1881)

== See also ==
- Interwar France
- List of French films of 1922
