= 1928 in France =

- Decades: 1900s; 1910s; 1920s; 1930s; 1940s
- See also: History of France; Timeline of French history; List of years in France

Events from the year 1928 in France.

== Incumbents ==
- President: Gaston Doumergue
- President of the Council of Ministers: Raymond Poincaré

== Events ==
- 22 April – Legislative Election held.
- 29 April – Legislative Election held.
- 7 July – The French government issues an order limiting the list of private radio stations permitted to continue broadcasting.
- 27 August – The Kellogg–Briand Pact is signed in Paris – the first treaty which outlaws aggressive war.

== Sport ==
- 17 June – Tour de France begins.
- 15 July – Tour de France ends, won by Nicolas Frantz of Luxembourg.

== Births ==
=== January to June ===
- 4 January – Maurice Rigobert Marie-Sainte, Martinique Roman Catholic clergyman (died 2017)
- 6 January – Capucine, actress (died 1990)
- 11 January – Andréa Guiot, soprano (died 2021)
- 17 January – Jean Barraqué, composer (died 1973)
- 23 January – Jeanne Moreau, film actress (died 2017)
- 24 January – Michel Serrault, actor (died 2007)
- 26 January – Roger Vadim, film director (died 2000)
- 10 February – Jean-Luc Lagardère, engineer and businessman (died 2003)
- 23 February – André Strappe, international soccer player (died 2006)
- 1 March – Jacques Rivette, filmmaker (died 2016)
- 3 March – Pierre Michelot, double bass player (died 2005)
- 19 March – Marceline Loridan-Ivens, writer, film director and Holocaust survivor (died 2018)
- 30 March – Robert Badinter, politician and lawyer (died 2024)
- 2 April – Serge Gainsbourg, poet, singer-songwriter, actor and director (died 1991)
- 12 April – Jean-François Paillard, conductor (died 2013)
- 28 April – Yves Klein, painter (died 1962)
- 2 May – Georges-Arthur Goldschmidt, French writer, German translator
- 3 May – Jacques-Louis Lions, mathematician (died 2001)
- 5 May – Jacques Médecin, politician (died 1998)
- 28 May – André Schwarz-Bart, novelist (died 2006)
- 19 June – Jacques Dupont, Olympic cyclist (died 2019)
- 20 June – Jean-Marie Le Pen, intelligence officer and far-right politician (died 2025)
- 29 June – Jean-Louis Pesch, writer (died 2023)
- 30 June – Nathaniel Tarn, poet, essayist, anthropologist and translator (died 2024)

=== July to December ===
- 2 July – Line Renaud, actress
- 3 July – Georges-Jean Arnaud, author (died 2020)
- 6 July – Bernard Malgrange, mathematician (died 2024)
- 10 July – Bernard Buffet, painter (died 1999)
- 13 July – Jeanne Loriod, musician (died 2001)
- 26 July – Elliott Erwitt, French-American photographer and director (died 2023)
- 30 July – Paul Bisciglia, film actor (died 2010)
- 2 August – Yoko Tani, French-born Japanese actress and nightclub entertainer (died 1999)
- 6 August
  - Jean-Christophe Averty, television and radio director (died 2017)
  - Michel Clouscard, Marxist philosopher and sociologist (died 2009)
  - Jean Carrière, writer (died 2005)
- 14 August
  - Jacques Rouffio, film director and screenwriter (died 2016)
  - Joëlle Bernard, film and television actress (died 1977)
- 21 September – Édouard Glissant, writer, poet and literary critic (died 2011)
- 27 September – Elizabeth F. Neufeld, French-born American geneticist
- 3 October – Christian d'Oriola, Olympic gold medal-winning foil fencer (died 2007)
- 23 October – Marthe Mercadier, actress (died 2021)
- 31 October – Jean-François Deniau, statesman, diplomat, essayist and novelist (died 2007)
- 13 November – Michel Gauquelin, psychologist and statistician (died 1991)
- 17 November – Arman, artist (died 2005)
- 2 December – Guy Bourdin, photographer (died 1991)
- 30 December – Christian Millau, food critic and author (died 2017)
- 31 December – Siné, cartoonist (died 2016)

=== Full date unknown ===
- Janine Chasseguet-Smirgel, psychoanalyst (died 2006)
- Jean-Jacques Millant, bow maker (died 1998)
- Jacques Poirier, painter (died 2002)

== Deaths ==
- 2 January – Yves du Manoir, rugby player (born 1904; air crash)
- 11 February – Émile Basly, miner and trade unionist (born 1854)
- 22 February – Yves Guyot, politician and economist (born 1843)
- 7 March – Jules Auguste Lemire, priest and social reformer (born 1853)
- 1 July – Achille Maffre de Baugé, poet (born 1855)
- 28 July – Édouard-Henri Avril, painter and commercial artist (born 1843)
- September – Paul Ferrier, dramatist (born 1843)
- 8 September – Jean Bourdeau, writer (born 1848)
- 23 October – François Victor Alphonse Aulard, historian (born 1849)
- 18 December
  - Louis-Anne-Jean Brocq, dermatologist (born 1856)
  - Lucien Capet, violinist and composer (born 1873)
- 23 December – Georges Destenave, explorer (born 1854)

== See also ==
- List of French films of 1928
