= Josy Moinet =

French politician (1929–2018)

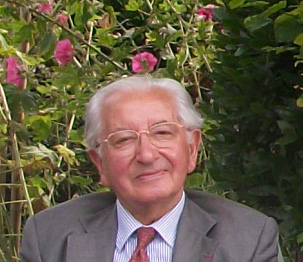

Josy Moinet (23 October 1929 – 4 August 2018) was a French politician who served as a Senator for Charente-Maritime from 1973 to 1989, and as Mayor of Saint-Rogatien from 1959 to 2008, representing the PRG.
