= Yves Le Trocquer =

French civil engineer and politician

Yves Marie François Le Trocquer
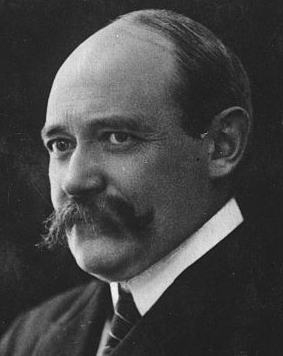

Deputy of Côtes-du-Nord
- In office 16 November 1919 – 30 January 1930

Minister of Public Works & Minister of Transport
- In office 20 January 1920 – 14 June 1924
- Prime Minister: Alexandre Millerand; Georges Leygues; Aristide Briand; Raymond Poincaré
- Preceded by: Albert Claveille
- Succeeded by: Pierre Laval

Senator of Côtes-du-Nord
- In office 14 January 1930 – 21 February 1938

Personal details
- Born: 4 October 1877 Pontrieux, Côtes-du-Nord, France
- Died: 21 February 1938 (aged 60) Paris, France
- Occupation: Engineer, administrator and politician

Yves Marie François Le Trocquer ( 4 October 1877 – 21 February 1938) was a French civil engineer, administrator and politician. After a career in public works projects he became a technical assistant to several government ministers. He administered the French waterways for military purposes during World War I (1914–18). He was elected Deputy of Côtes-du-Nord in 1919, and from 1920 to 1924 was Minister of Public Works. In 1930 he left the Chamber of Deputies for the Senate, where he served for the remainder of his life.

== Life ==
=== Early years (1877–1910) ===
Yves Marie François Le Trocquer was born on 4 October 1877 in Pontrieux, Côtes-du-Nord. When he was two years old his father, a lieutenant in the navy, died on 28 June 1879 aboard the Amiral Charner. Le Trocquer entered the Ecole polytechnique, and after graduation became a member of the Corps des ponts et chaussées. He first worked in the ports of Nantes and Saint-Nazaire, then for the Seine department. He proved very capable both as a technician and as an administrator, and became a chief engineer at the age of 36.

=== Government appointments (1910–19) ===
In 1910 Le Trocquer became technical director of the cabinet of Louis Puech, Minister of Public Works. He served in the same role in the successive cabinets of Charles Dumont and Victor Augagneur. He followed Augagneur to the Ministry of Public Education and then the Ministry of the Navy. During World War I (1914–18) in 1915 he was appointed Director of Military Transport and Operation of Waterways, and Director of the National Board of Navigation. For the services he rendered in these positions he was made an Officer of the Legion of Honour. In 1919 he became general director of the cabinet of Jules Cels^{(fr)}, Undersecretary of State for the Navy.

=== Deputy (1919–30) ===
Le Trocquer was elected Deputy of Côtes-du-Nord on 19 November 1919. He sat with the Left Republican group. Soon after being elected Le Trocquer was appointed Undersecretary of State for Liquidation of Stocks in the second cabinet of Georges Clemenceau.

Le Trocquer was next appointed Minister of Public Works in the first cabinet of Alexandre Millerand, and held this position for four and a half years in seven different governments. He oversaw a major post-war reconstruction of railways, waterways and roads in the liberated regions. The railway unions had responded to requests for responsibility by the Minister of Public Works in January 1919 by demanding nationalization of the railways, which the railway executives saw as a revolutionary and anarchic demand. During an early dispute with the railway workers, Le Trocquer supported the railway management. He said in the Chamber, "I am here to have discipline respected. I shall never commit an act which could have as a consequence the weakening of suspension of sanctions pronounced by responsible chiefs for acts of indiscipline."

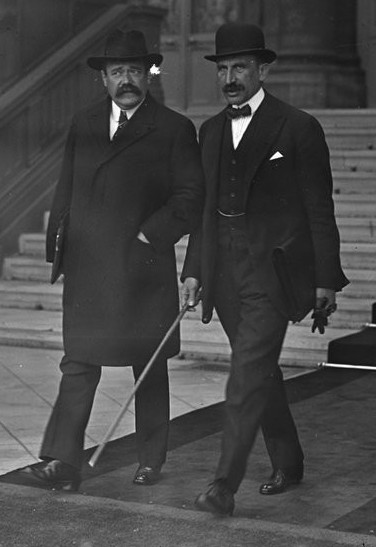
Le Trocquer and Charles de Lasteyrie leaving the Palais de l'Élysée in September 1922

Le Trocquer estimated that France needed 70 million tons of coal annually, but 1919 production was around 20 million tons and the war-damaged mines of the north were unable to produce more in the short term. Requisition of German coal in lieu of reparations was the obvious solution. In 1922 Le Trocquer warned that in less than ten years Germany would no longer be obliged by treaty to deliver coke. He called for either taking direct control of state mines in the Ruhr or gaining control of the Ruhr coal industry as reparation. Le Trocquer was involved in the 1923 occupation of the Ruhr and the rehabilitation of the Saar mines.

Le Trocquer developed the concept of "green coal", by which the water network could be put to the use of Breton industry. He promoted construction of the Guerlédan dam in 1923, and tried with less success to develop a power plant on the Rance. He was reelected on 11 May 1924, and sat with the Democratic Republican group. After leaving the cabinet Le Trocquer continued to be interested in the question of reparations, and participated in a committee of inquiry on this subject.

The French Committee of the European Customs Union (UDE) was constituted on 28 January 1927, headed by Charles Gide and Yves Le Trocquer. Le Trocquer was reelected on 22 April 1928 and sat with the Radical Left group. In 1928 Le Trocquet was chairman of the Franco-German liaison committee of French parliamentarians, with Aristide Briand and Joseph Paul-Boncour as honorary convenors. After intense lobbying the committee managed to get Germany to create a corresponding committee in 1929 chaired by Joseph Wirth. Le Troquet wrote in the left-oriented La Volonté that rapprochement with Germany was a step towards the unification of Europe. On 24 November 1928 the Federal Committee for European Cooperation was formed with Émile Borel as president. Yves Le Troquet was president of its French committee. He left the Chamber of Deputies on 30 January 1930 after being elected to the Senate.

=== Senator (1930–38) ===
Le Trocquer was elected Senator of Côtes-du-Nord on 14 January 1930, and held office until his death in 1938. He was elected at the top of on the list of the Republican and National Union. He was a member of committees on public works, colonies, Algeria and foreign affairs. He was often involved in debates on railways, ports, roads, electricity and public utilities, sometimes as rapporteur. He was also involved in various economic and social issues. Le Trocquer often travelled abroad, and developed friendships with foreign counterparts. He became President of the Democratic and Radical Union parliamentary group, and Vice-President of the Democratic Alliance.

Le Trocquer died in Paris on 21 February 1938. On 4 May 1939 the general council of Côtes-du-Nord granted 5,000 francs to the municipality of Pontrieux for a monument to Le Troquet. The granite monument to Troquet with a bronze medallion of his head by the sculptor Renaud was inaugurated in the Place Le Trocquer after World War II (1939–45) in a ceremony attended by the deputy René Pleven.

== Publications ==
Publications by Le Trocquer include:

- Yves Le Trocquer (1914), De la Politique économique, administrative et financière à suivre en matière de travaux publics (ports maritimes et canaux) (Doctoral thesis), Paris: A. Rousseau / Université de Paris. Faculté de droit, p. 343
- Samuel Gompers (1924), Ligue de nations ou ligue de financiers, Introduction by Yves Le Trocquer, translated from the English by Mlle Jeanne Laporte, Paris
- Yves Le Trocquer (1929), Union douanière européenne. Conférence de M. Yves Le Trocquer, député, ancien ministre, président du Comité français de l'Union douanière européenne. Annexes documentaires (Dotation Carnegie pour la paix internationale. Division des relations internationales et de l'éducation. Bulletin n° 4. 1929), La Flèche / Paris: Impr., service des expéditions / publications de la Conciliation internationale, p. 93
- Yves Le Trocquer (1929), La politique protectionniste des États-Unis d'Amérique en face des États d'Europe (Extrait du "Monde nouveau", avril 1929), Paris: Monde nouveau, p. 8
- Yves Le Trocquer (1929), L'Union douanière européenne est-elle désirable ? Est-elle réalisable ?, Liège : Sté belge d'études et d'expansion, p. 14
- Yves Le Trocquer (1931), La route et sa technique, Paris: F. Alcan, p. 119
- Yves Le Trocquer (1932), La Convention d'Ouchy, 1ère étape vers l'Union douanière européenne. Yves Le Trocquer,..., Liège: Sté belge d'études et d'expansion, p. 7
- Yves Le Trocquer (1935), Mémorandum adressé à la Société des nations et aux gouvernements des États européens (Congrès économique européen. 2° Congrès d'union douanière européenne, Bruxelles, 15-17 mai 1935, organisé par le Comité international d'union économique et douanière européenne, avec la collaboration de l'Institut d'économie européenne), Paris: Comité international d'union économique et douanière européenne, p. 10

== Sources ==
- Badel, Laurence (1999), "IV. Associations privées et Europe", Un milieu libéral et européen : Le grand commerce français 1925-1948 (in French), Vincennes: Institut de la gestion publique et du développement économique, doi:10.4000/books.igpde.2218, ISBN 9782821828575
- Evanno, Yves-Marie (2013), "De la Ruhr à Guerlédan : itinéraire d'un ingénieur devenu ministre, Yves Le Trocquer", En Envor (in French)
- Fischer, Conan (2017-01-26), A Vision of Europe: Franco-German Relations during the Great Depression, 1929-1932, OUP Oxford, ISBN 978-0-19-166380-2
- Jackson, Peter (2013-12-05), Beyond the Balance of Power: France and the Politics of National Security in the Era of the First World War, Cambridge University Press, ISBN 978-1-107-78303-4
- Jolly, Jean, ed. (1960), "LE TROCQUER (YVES)", Dictionnaire des parlementaires français de 1889 à 1940, Presses universitaires de France
- Le Trocquer Yves (in French), Sénat de France
- Maier, Charles S. (2015-10-27), Recasting Bourgeois Europe: Stabilization in France, Germany, and Italy in the Decade after World War I, Princeton University Press, ISBN 978-1-4008-7370-8
- Perchet, Dominique (16 December 2014), "Monument à Yves Le Trocquer – Pontrieux", e-monumen (in French)
- Yves Le Trocquer (in French), Assemblée nationale
- Yves Le Trocquer (1877-1938) (in French), BnF: Bibliotheque nationale de France
