= Claude Abbes =

French association football player (1927-2008)

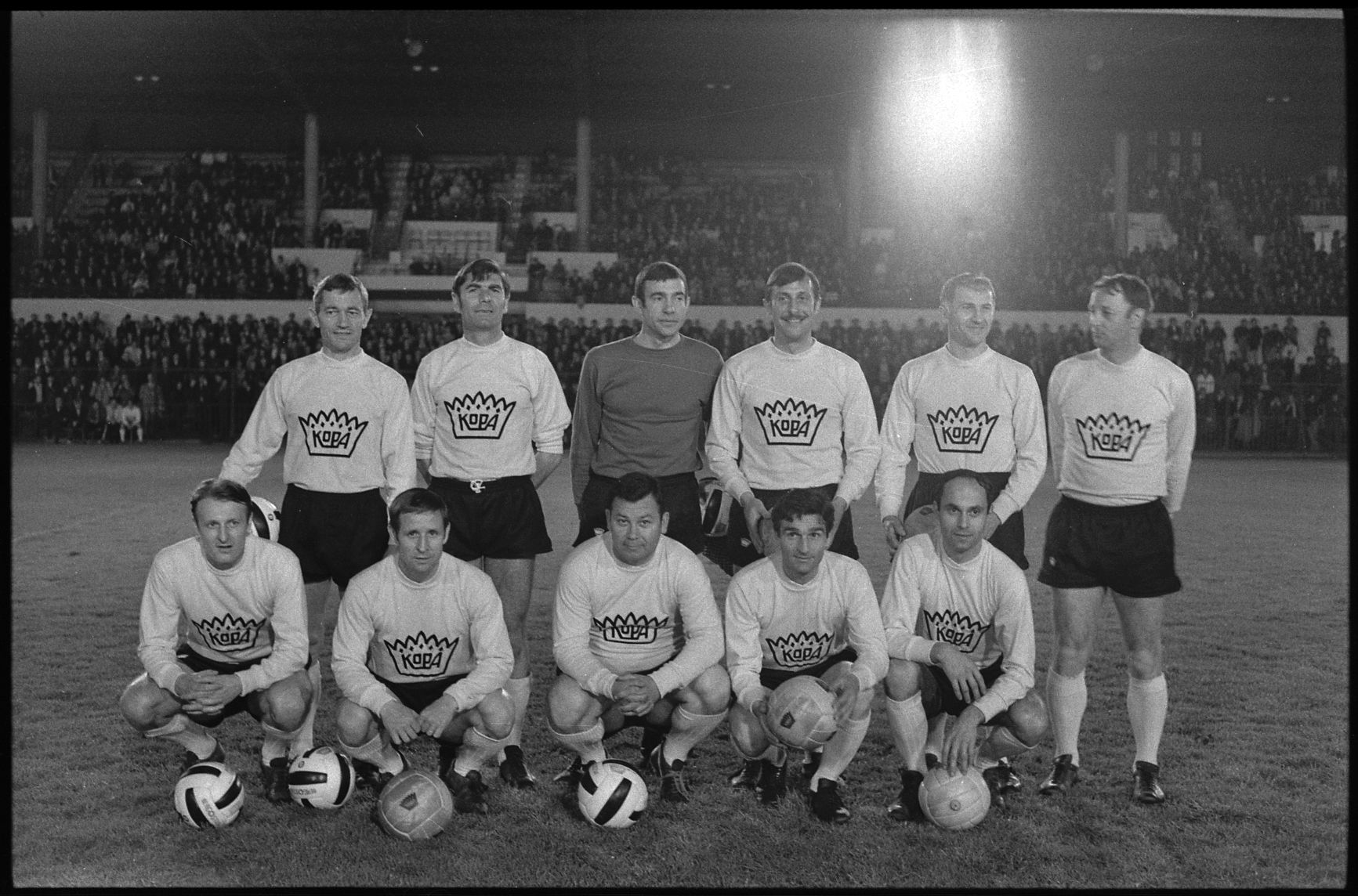
- Stadium municipal de Toulouse, 1bis allées Gabriel-Biénès. 6 Mai 1969. Vue des anciens joueurs de l'équipe de France de la Coupe du Monde de 1958 en Suède.

Personal information
- Full name: Claude Jean Jules César Abbes
- Date of birth: 24 May 1927
- Place of birth: Faugères, France
- Date of death: 11 April 2008 (aged 80)
- Place of death: Paris, France
- Height: 1.80 m (5 ft 11 in)
- Position: Goalkeeper

Youth career
- Bédarieux
- Lobastide

Senior career*
Years	Team	Apps	(Gls)
1951–1952	Béziers	75	(0)
1952–1962	Saint-Étienne	259	(0)

International career
1957–1958	France	9	(0)

Managerial career
- 1962–1967: Montélimar
Medal record
Representing France
FIFA World Cup
Third place	1958 Sweden
- * Club domestic league appearances and goals

Claude Jean Jules César Abbes (24 May 1927 – 11 April 2008) was a French professional footballer who played as a goalkeeper.

== Career ==
Abbes played the majority of his professional career for local club Saint-Étienne, where he won the 1957 Première division, the first title ever for the club.

He was also part of the France national team squads at the FIFA World Cups of 1954 and 1958, and played four matches at the latter, where France finished in third place.

He died on 11 April 2008.
