= Claude Ponsard =

French economist

Claude Ponsard (1927–1990) was a French economist who worked in spatial economics and in the application of fuzzy set theory to economics. Bo Yuan and George J. Klir noted that Ponsard was a "pioneer who initiated the reformulation of economic theory by taking advantage of fuzzy set theory" in their book, Fuzzy sets and fuzzy logic theory and applications (1995).

== Publications ==
- Claude Ponsard (October 1983). History of Spatial Economic Theory (hardcover). Texts and Monographs in Economics and Mathematical Systems).
- Claude Ponsard (1989). Some dissenting views on the transitivity of individual preference. I.M.E. Document de travail.
