= Eugène Petit =

French painter

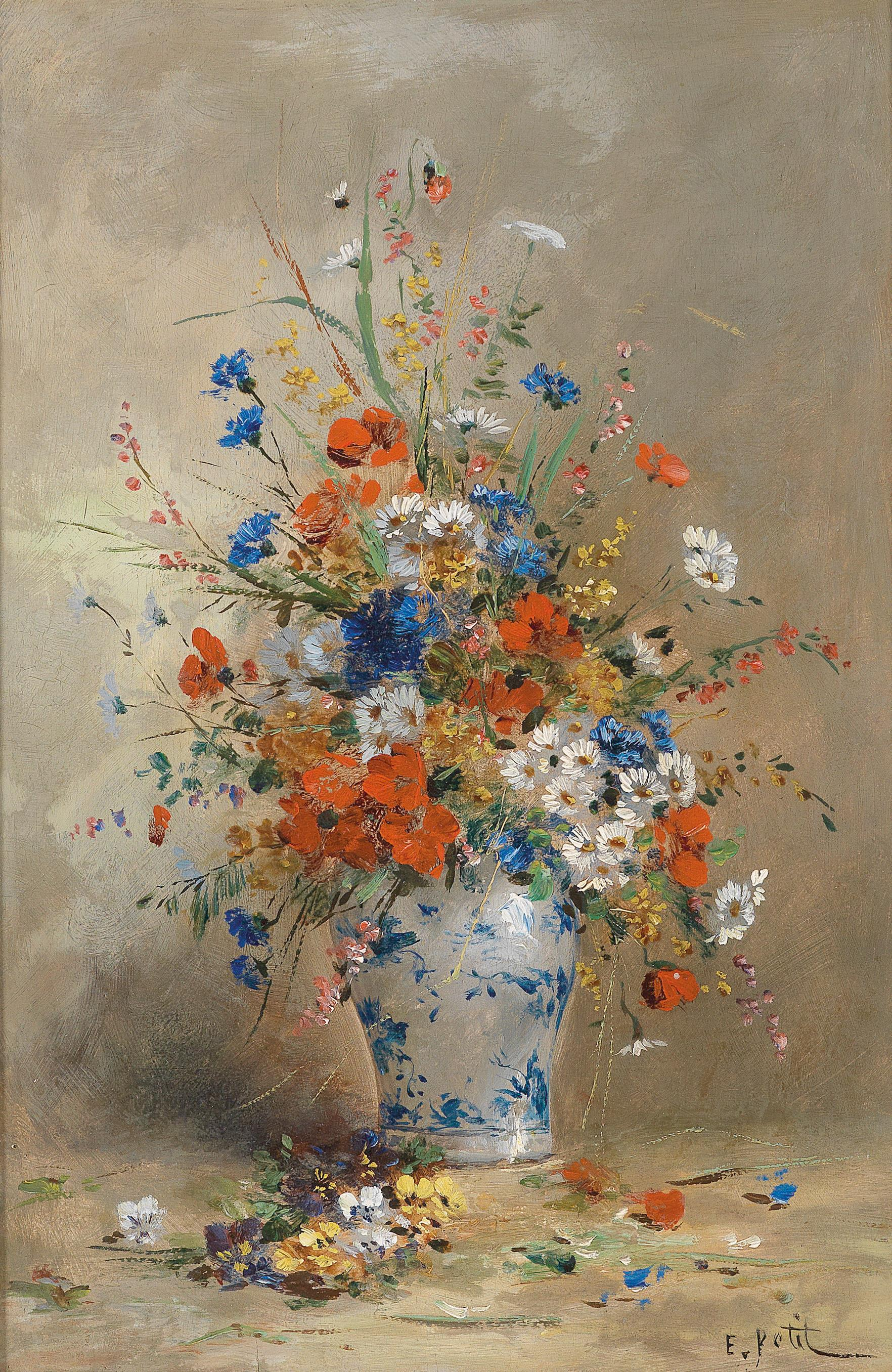
Blumenstillleben

Eugène Petit (1839–1886) was a French flower painter and textile designer.

== Biography ==
Eugene Petit was born in Paris in 1839. He briefly taught the American painter Henry Woodbridge Parton, c.1875.

He specialized in still life paintings of flowers and fruits, as well as sporting dogs. His work has been found in museums in Carcassonne, Compiègne, Courtrai, Rouen and Saint-Etienne in France as well as The Sladmore Gallery in London. Some of his work has been auctioned at Bonhams. One of his hunting scenes, "On the Scent, Setters" sold at Sothebys in New York for $13,200 in 2006.

== Work ==
- Summer Flowers in a Vase
- Still life with peonies and roses
- Daisies, Poppies And Wild Roses
- Summer blooms in a glass vase
- Spaniels hunting duck
- Still life
- Setters flushing out ducks
- Chrysanthemums in a brass urn, and a silver tray and jug on a draped table
- The Chase
- Setters flushing out duck
- Blossom branches and peonies in a vase
- On the point
- On the point 2
- Pointers on the scent
- Pointers by the edge of a lake
- A pointer and a setter on the scent
- The Garden Gate
- Two Pointers Hunting by a Path
- Le chemin aux arbres et fleurs
