= Charles Berny d'Ouvillé =

French painter

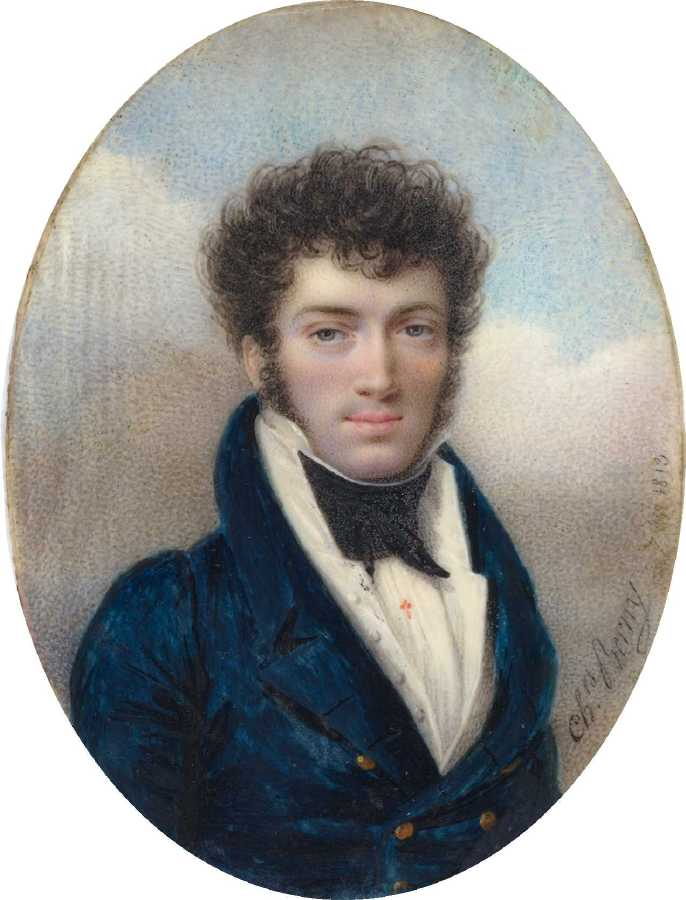
Portrait miniature of the tenor Jean Elleviou, 1813 by Charles Berny

Claude Charles Antoine Berny d'Ouvillé or Charles Berny (1771–1856) was a French painter and miniaturist. He made exhibitions of his paintings in the Salon de Paris from 1802 to 1833, one of these portraits was that of the famous actress Émilie Leverd. His Étude de jeune fille dans un drapé classique is in the Wallace Collection.

He was born in Clermont. He married Eulalie Joséphine Biju-Duval d'Algreis in 1811, and they had a child, who was portrayed by Eugène Delacroix in 1828 (the portrait is in McIlhenney Collection in Philadelphia, U.S.). He died in Batignolles.
