= Joseph Albert Alexandre Glatigny =

French poet, comedian and playwright (1839–1873)

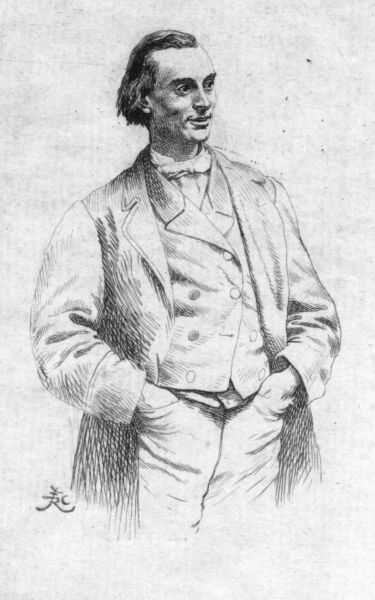
Joseph Albert Alexandre Glatigny.

Joseph Albert Alexandre Glatigny (May 21, 1839, at Lilleborne, Seine Inférieure - April 16, 1873, at Sèvres), was a French poet, comedian and playwright.

== Life and work ==
His father was a carpenter who moved to Bernay in 1844 on being made a gendarme. After an uncertain period on leaving school, the teenager took apprenticeship under a printer at Pont Audemer and there wrote a three-act verse drama for the local theatre about the townsfolk in the 17th century. He then joined a travelling company of actors as prompter.

In the course of a wandering existence about the north of France, he fell in with the publisher Auguste Poulet-Malassis, who introduced him to the Odes funambulesques (Fantastic Odes) of Théodore de Banville. Inspired by these, he published at eighteen his Vignes folles (Mad Vines, 1857), which he dedicated to his 'beloved master'. During a subsequent stay in Paris he had an act in the cafes and bars in which he improvised poems on rhymes suggested by his audience, putting to use the slight stir that this high-spirited first volume had caused. Once more on the road, still turning out plays and occasionally acting, he left a scattering of such improvisations and occasional verses in the little provincial newspapers.

His inseparable companion and trademark at this time was a French terrier named Toupinel. Its successor was the mongrel Cosette, the subject of one of Glatigny's sonnets and also included in the caricature of him by André Gill. This illustrated the bizarre episode in Corsica early in 1869 when he was arrested and put in irons for a week through being mistaken by the authorities for a notorious criminal. Typically, he immediately published an account of the incident in Le jour de l'an d'un vagabond (A day in a tramp's year). In 1871, weakened by the hardships of his life and in poor health, he married Emma Dennie, who was American-born but brought up in France. She nursed him though his final illness two years later but survived him barely a month.

Glatigny's best collection of lyrics, Les Flèches d'or (Arrows of gold), had appeared in 1864, dedicated to the Parnassian poet Leconte de Lisle, with an opening poem addressed to Théophile Gautier. It was followed by other occasional verse, including Le Fer Rouge (Red light, 1870) and a third collection of poems, Gilles et pasquins (Tom-fooleries, 1872), dedicated to the left-wing politician Camille Pelletan. In 1917 his collected works were awarded the prix de littérature by the Académie française.

== Bibliography ==
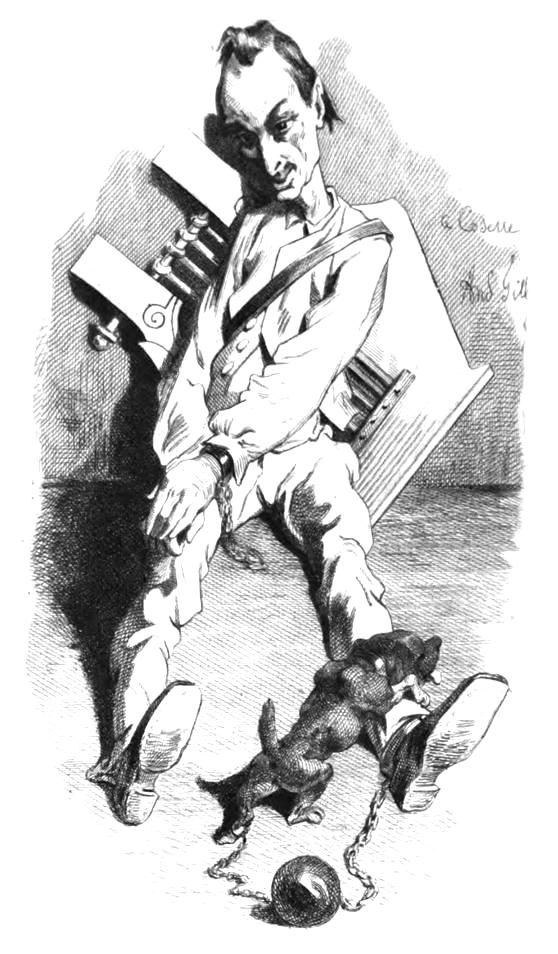
A caricature by André Gill illustrating Glatigny's imprisonment in Corsica, 1869

- Les Vignes folles, poésies (1857)
- Prologue d'ouverture, dit le 5 octobre 1863 par Mlle Jeanne Favre, théâtre de Lunéville, représentations de la troupe du théâtre de Nancy, Nancy, 1863, Gallica
- L’Ombre de Callot, prologue en vers en 1 acte, Nancy, Théâtre, 26 septembre 1863
- Vers les saules, comédie, Vichy, Casino, 25 juin 1864 Online
- Les Flèches d’or, poésies (1864)
- Joyeusetés galantes et autres du vidame Bonaventure de La Braguette (1866)
- Prologue, Paris, Théâtre des Délassements-Comiques, 4 mai 1867 Online
- Le Bois, comédie en 1 acte, Bayonne, Théâtre, janvier 1868
- Pès de Puyane, maire de Bayonne, drame en 3 actes, Bayonne, Théâtre, 2 mai 1868
- Testament de l'illustre Brisacier (c.1868)
- Le Jour de l’an d’un vagabond (1869)
- La Sultane Rozréa (1870)
- Le Fer rouge, nouveaux châtiments (1870)
- Les bons contes du sire de La Glotte: suivis de La chaste Suzanne, opéra-comique en un acte (1870)
- Le Compliment à Molière, à-propos en 1 acte, Paris, Théâtre de l'Odéon, 15 janvier 1872 Texte en ligne
- Les Folies-Marigny. Prologue, Paris, Alphonse Lemerre, 1872. Représentation : Les Folies-Marigny, 8. online
- La Presse nouvelle (1872)
- Gilles et pasquins (1872)
- Le Singe, comédie en 1 acte (1872)
- L’Illustre Brizacier, drame en 1 acte (1873)

Posthumous

- Œuvres d’Albert Glatigny Poésies complètes: Les Vignes folles. Les Flèches d’or. Gilles et Pasquins (1879)
- Scapin maquereau, drame en deux actes (1883)
- Lettres d’Albert Glatigny à Théodore de Banville, préface par Guy Chastel (1923)
- Erreur n’est pas compte, proverbe en un acte (1925)
- Lettres inédites de Albert Glatigny, publiées par Victor Sanson (1932)
- Pages retrouvées. Les Héritiers de Scarron, roman comique (1940)
- Lettres à Stéphane Mallarmé (1965)
