= Georges Lévis =

French comics artist

- Born: Jean Sidobre; 7 August 1924; Toulouse, France
- Died: 31 March 1988; Le Mesnil-Saint-Denis, France
- Occupation: Comic artist

Jean Sidobre (7 August 1924 – 31 March 1988) was a French adult comic artist.

Under the name of Georgs Lévis, he was the illustrator of the French edition of the Famous Five and other children's books. Under another pseudonym, "Sainclair", he would illustrate comic stories for various publications, including Ce soir, a newspaper founded by the French Communist Party, and Nous deux, a popular French lifestyle magazine aimed at women.
