= 1925 in France =

- Decades: 1900s; 1910s; 1920s; 1930s; 1940s
- See also: History of France; Timeline of French history; List of years in France

Events from the year 1925 in France.

== Incumbents ==
- President: Gaston Doumergue
- President of the Council of Ministers:
  - until 17 April: Édouard Herriot
  - 17 April-28 November: Paul Painlevé
  - starting 28 November: Aristide Briand

== Events ==
- 21 May – 25 October International Exhibition of Hydropower and Tourism in Grenoble.
- 25 August – Occupation of the Ruhr ends with the evacuation of the last French troops.
- Cookware manufacturer Le Creuset established in Fresnoy-le-Grand.
- Ybry, a French luxury perfume and fashion house is founded.

== Sport ==
- 21 June – Tour de France begins.
- 19 July – Tour de France ends, won by Ottavio Bottecchia of Italy.

== Births ==
=== January to March ===
- 1 January – Raymond Pellegrin, actor (died 2007)
- 6 January – Joseph-André Motte, furniture designer (died 2013)
- 7 January – Pierre Gripari, writer (died 1990)
- 18 January – Gilles Deleuze, philosopher (died 1995)
- 2 February – Marcela Delpastre, author (died 1998)
- 13 February – René Pleimelding, soccer player (died 1998)
- 16 February – François-Xavier Ortoli, politician, businessman, Minister and President of the European Commission (died 2007)
- 4 March – Paul Mauriat, musical director (died 2006)
- 12 March
  - Louison Bobet, cyclist, three times Tour de France winner (died 1983)
  - Georges Delerue, film composer (died 1992)
- 21 March – Max Varnel, film and television director (died 1996)
- 26 March – Pierre Boulez, composer and conductor (died 2016)

=== April to June ===
- 10 April – Bernard Moitessier, yachtsman and author (died 1994)
- 27 April – François Châtelet, historian of philosophy (died 1985)
- 30 April – Corinne Calvet, actress (died 2001)
- 3 May – Jean Séguy, sociologist of religions (died 2007)
- 17 May
  - Michel de Certeau, Jesuit and scholar (died 1986)
  - Claude Julien, journalist and editor (died 2005)
- 25 May – Claude Pinoteau, film director and scriptwriter (died 2012)
- 27 May – Jean-Paul Aron, writer and journalist (died 1988)
- 8 June – Claude Estier, politician and journalist (died 2016)
- 14 June – Jean-Louis Rosier, racing driver (died 2011)
- 25 June – Charles Ceccaldi-Raynaud, lawyer and politician (died 2019)
- 26 June – Jean Frydman, French resistant and businessman (died 2021)

=== July to September ===
- 3 July – Roger Chesneau, steeplechaser (died 2012)
- 8 July
  - Jean Cau, writer and journalist (died 1993)
  - Dominique Nohain, actor, dramatist and director (died 2017)
- 14 July – Gaston Rousseau, racing cyclist (died 2019)
- 19 July
  - Henri Beaujean, politician (died 2021)
  - Jean-Pierre Faye, philosopher, poet and writer (died 2026)
- 20 July
  - Jacques Delors, European politician (died 2023)
  - Frantz Fanon, Martinique-born psychiatrist and philosopher (died 1961)
- 6 August
  - Lilyan Chauvin, actress and writer (died 2008)
  - Guy Degrenne, businessman (died 2006)
- 21 August – Maurice Pialat, film director, screenwriter and actor (died 2003)
- 26 August – Alain Peyrefitte, scholar and politician (died 1999)
- 27 August – Darry Cowl, actor and musician (died 2006)
- 30 August – Laurent de Brunhoff, author and illustrator (died 2024)

=== October to December ===
- 3 October – Simone Segouin, Resistance fighter (died 2023)
- 13 October – Armand Mouyal, epee fencer (died 1988)
- 31 October -
  - Roger Nimier, novelist (died 1962)
  - Franck Ténot, press agent, pataphysician and jazz critic (died 2004)
- 24 November – André Lévy, sinologist (died 2017)
- 27 November – Claude Lanzmann, documentary filmmaker and philosopher (died 2018)
- 2 December – Jacques Lacarrière, writer, critic, journalist, and essayist (died 2005)
- 5 December – Henri Oreiller, alpine skier and Olympic gold medallist (died 1962)
- 7 December – Hermano da Silva Ramos, French-Brazilian Formula One driver (died 2026)
- 23 December – Pierre Bérégovoy, politician and Prime Minister (died 1993)
- 26 December – Claude Meillassoux, economic anthropologist and Africanist (died 2005)

=== Full date unknown ===
- Roger Giroux, poet (died 1974)
- Claude Tresmontant, philosopher, hellenist and theologian (died 1997)

== Deaths ==
=== January to June ===
- 29 January – Charles-Eusèbe Dionne, naturalist and taxidermist (born 1846)
- 10 February – Aristide Bruant, singer, comedian and nightclub owner (born 1851)
- 14 February – Jacques Rivière, man of letters (born 1886; typhoid)
- 25 February – Louis Feuillade, film director (born 1873)
- 4 March – Roger de Barbarin, trap shooter (born 1860)
- 5 March
  - Clément Ader, engineer and aviation pioneer (born 1841)
  - Michel Verne, writer (born 1861)
- 19 March – Firmin Bouisset, poster artist (born 1859)
- 22 April – André Caplet, composer and conductor (born 1878)
- 3 May – Louis Delaporte, explorer and artist (born 1842)
- 12 May
  - Léonce Bénédite, art historian and curator (born 1856)
  - Charles Mangin, general during World War I (born 1866)
- 1 June – Lucien Guitry, actor (born 1860)
- 6 June – Pierre Louÿs, poet (born 1870)
- 13 June – Paul Teste, aviator (born 1892; air crash)

=== July to December ===
- 1 July – Erik Satie, composer and pianist (born 1866)
- 5 August – Georges Palante, philosopher and sociologist (born 1862)
- 12 August – Leon Dehon, clergyman (born 1843)
- 7 September – René Viviani, politician, Prime Minister (born 1863)
- 29 September – Léon Bourgeois, politician, Prime Minister, awarded Nobel Peace Prize in 1920 (born 1851)
- 31 October – Max Linder, actor (born 1883)
- 11 November – Hugh Antoine d'Arcy, poet, writer and pioneer executive in the American motion picture industry (born 1843)
- 21 December – Jules Méline, statesman, Prime Minister (born 1838)
- 22 December – Joseph Ravaisou, landscape painter (born 1865)
- 26 December – Jules Patenotre des Noyers, diplomat (born 1845)
- 27 December – Marie-Louise Jaÿ, businesswoman (born 1838)

== See also ==
- List of French films of 1925
