= Gaspard de Chabrol =

French official

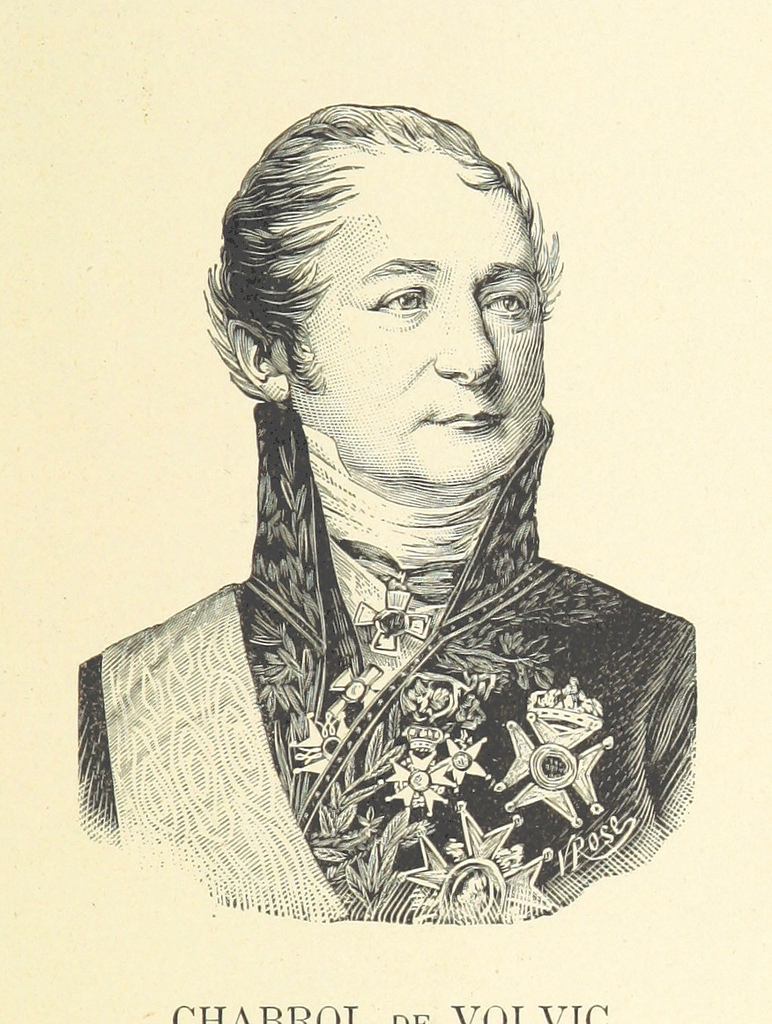
Comte de Chabrol de Volvic

Gilbert Joseph Gaspard, comte de Chabrol de Volvic (25 September 1773, Riom, Puy-de-Dôme – 30 April 1843, Paris) was a French official.

== Biography ==
Gaspard de Chabrol was born on the 25 September 1773 in Riom, Puy-de-Dôme, Auvergne, the youngest son of Gaspard-Claude-François, comte de Chabrol, a noble and statesman.

=== Napoleonic era ===
Graduating from the École Polytechnique, Chabrol was designated ingénieur des ponts et chaussées (18 April 1796), but was soon after sent to Egypt as part of the scientific commission which followed Napoleon's campaign. He published several works inspired by his time in Egypt, ranging from topographical studies to an essay on the mores of the Egyptian people.

Between 1803 and 1806 he was subprefect of the town of Pontivy, which the central authorities were trying to turn into an administrative and military center of a highly royalist Brittany. Chabrol drew the plans for the "new town", which was renamed Napoléonville in 1804, greatly expanding it by building, among others, law courts, a town hall and a school.

Between 1806 and 1812 he was prefect of the department of Montenotte, in the newly annexed Italian territory. After the annexation of the Papal States in 1809, Chabrol also served as an Imperial Commissioner to the Pope, effectively acting as a jailer of Pius VII during his exile to Savona, issuing him with a "guard of honor" that insured both the Pope's safety and his compliance.

=== Prefect of Paris ===
He was named prefect of the Seine (and thus Prefect of Paris) by Napoleon in 1812, an office he held until 1836, with a short gap in 1830. Despite the calls for dismissal of some ultra-loyalists after the Bourbon Restoration, Louis XVIII refused to depose him, claiming that "M. de Chabrol married the city of Paris, and I abolished the divorce". Indeed, in 1816 he was made a count.

He is to be credited with creating more than 130 public roads, extending the sewer system, as well as with paving several of Paris's streets and boulevards. The pavement was edged with volcanic stone from Volvic, thus boosting his namesake town. He also began the gradual conversion of the city lighting to gaslight.

Under his supervision the first statistical research of the city of Paris was undertaken beginning with 1821, which marked a transition to a more scientific approach to urban planning.

He is particularly remembered for his services to education, having taken an active interest in the reorganization of high schools, in the restoration of the Sorbonne and in the establishment of primary education. Between 1820 and 1821 he created two adult education courses in Paris (precursor of today's 'Éducation populaire'), directed by Monsieur Delahaye. Outside the capital, he also created and financed the École d'Architecture et de Sculpture de Volvic (now the École Départementale d'Architecture de Volvic).

=== Member of Parliament ===
In 1816 he is elected to the Chamber of Deputies as a representative of Puy-de-Dôme. He holds this position until the advent of the July Monarchy in 1830, when he resigns both as Prefect of the Seine and as deputy. Nevertheless, he was re-elected deputy of Puy-de-Dome in 1839 and 1842.

He died on 30 April 1843 in Paris at the age of 69. He is buried in the Père Lachaise Cemetery.

== Legacy and honours ==
Chabrol was the recipient of the Légion d'honneur in 1811, under Napoleon, and continued to be decorated under the restored monarchy as well, finally being given the highest rank, the Grand Cross of the Legion of Honour, in 1829, by Charles X. He is commemorated in the rue de Chabrol, opened in 1822 between rue La Fayette and boulevard de Magenta, and to the cité de Chabrol which links cour de la Ferme-Saint-Lazare to rue de Chabrol.

He is credited with originating the phrase "Hundred Days" - les cent jours, in his speech welcoming the returning Louis XVIII.
