= Henri Beaujean =

Guadeloupean politician (1925–2021)

Henri Beaujean (19 July 1925 – 11 May 2021) was a politician from Guadeloupe who served in the French National Assembly from 1986 to 1988. He was born in Le Moule on 19 July 1925, and died there on 11 May 2021, at the age of 95.
