= Paul Amargier =

French Dominican priest and historian (1924–2021)

- Born: 15 June 1924; Montpellier, France
- Died: 8 January 2021 (aged 96); Marseille, France
- Occupation: Historian

Paul Amargier (15 June 1924 – 8 January 2021) was a French historian and Catholic priest.

== Biography ==
Amargier was a member of the Dominican Order of Catholic priests while simultaneously working as a researcher and historian under the direction of Professor Georges Duby at the University of Provence. In 1986, he was elected to the Académie de Marseille.

Paul Amargier died in Marseille on 8 January 2021 at the age of 96.

== Publications ==
- Cartulaire de Trinquetaille (1972)
- Dauphine de Puimichel et son entourage au temps de sa vie aptésienne (1345-1360) et André Vauchez (1987)
- Un âge d'or du monachisme, Saint-Victor de Marseille (990-1090) (1990)
- Münzer H., L’itinéraire de Jérôme Münzer en l’an 1495 (1991)
- Marseille au Moyen Age (1996)
- Marseille au Ve siècle (1998)
- Balade dans les vieux quartiers de Marseille (2004)
