= Georges Boudarel =

French militant communist (1926–2003)

- Born: Émile Raymond Georges Marius Boudarel; 21 December 1926; Saint-Étienne, Loire, France
- Died: 26 December 2003 (aged 77); Les Lilas, Paris, France
- Occupations: Political commissar, academic
- Employer: University of Paris
- Known for: Torture of French prisoners during the First Indochina War

Émile Raymond Georges Marius Boudarel (French pronunciation: [emil ʁɛmɔ̃ ʒɔʁʒ maʁjys budaʁɛl]) (21 December 1926 – 26 December 2003) was a French academic and militant communist who was accused of torturing French prisoners for the Viet Minh during the First Indochina War.

== Biography ==
Born at Saint-Étienne, Loire, Boudarel studied at a Marist seminary before becoming a history professor at the Saigon Lycée Marie-Curie in the late 1940s and during the First Indochina War. He led the Indochinese branch of the French Communist Party, called Groupe culturel marxiste.

In 1949, Boudarel, now a teacher of philosophy at the Lycée Yersin in Da Lat, left his job and joined with the Viet Minh in the North of Tonkin, where he was made a political commissar in the prisoner camp "Camp 113" at Lang-Kieu, near the Chinese border, South of Ha-Giang. He went by the nom de guerre of Dai Dong. Numerous testimonies of survivors of the camp later accused Boudarel of torturing French Army prisoners "with perverse cruelty, he applied to his countrymen the method of degradation by hunger, physical decline, political indoctrination and denunciation among inmates". During the year where he was on duty at the camp, 278 prisoners out of 320 perished.

Boudarel left Vietnam in 1964 for the Soviet Union. He later worked in Czechoslovakia for the World Federation of Trade Unions.

After an amnesty law was voted by the Parliament of France in June 1966, notably granting amnesty for crimes committed during the Indochina War, he returned to France where he obtained a position as a maître de conférences at Paris Diderot University, and researcher at CNRS. He took part in the Mai 68 movement.

On 13 February 1991, during a conference organised at the French Senate by the Centre des hautes études sur l’Afrique et l’Asie modernes, he was recognised by Jean-Jacques Beucler, a former secretary of State for veterans, who had been a prisoner at Camp 113. Further testimonies emerged, and within a year, charges of crimes against humanity were raised by survivors of Camp 113. The charges were turned down by the Cour de Cassation because of the 1966 amnesty law. A recourse made on 25 February 2000 at the European Court of Human Rights against France, complaining about the decision by the French Cour de Cassation and alleged violations of freedom of speech, was similarly turned down in March 2003.

The ensuing controversy led to a proposal to amend article 213-5 of the French penal code so as to make crimes against humanity ineligible for amnesty.

== Works ==
- Georges Boudarel, La Bureaucratie au Viêt Nam, L'Harmattan, 1983.
- Georges Boudarel, Cent fleurs éclosent dans la nuit du Viêt Nam, Jacques Bertoin, 1991

=== Bibliography ===
- Yves Daoudal, préface de Jean-Baptiste Biaggi, Le dossier Boudarel, Editions Remi Perrin, 2001
- Jean-Jacques Beucler, Mémoires, France-Empire, 1991
- Thomas Capitaine, Captifs du Viet-Minh. Les victimes de Boudarel parlent, Union Nationale Inter-universitaire, Paris, 1991 available online
- Claude Cohen, « La problématique du crime contre l'humanité », Gazette du Palais, 26 février 2002, n° 57, p. 46
