= Annette Chalut =

French physician (1924–2021)

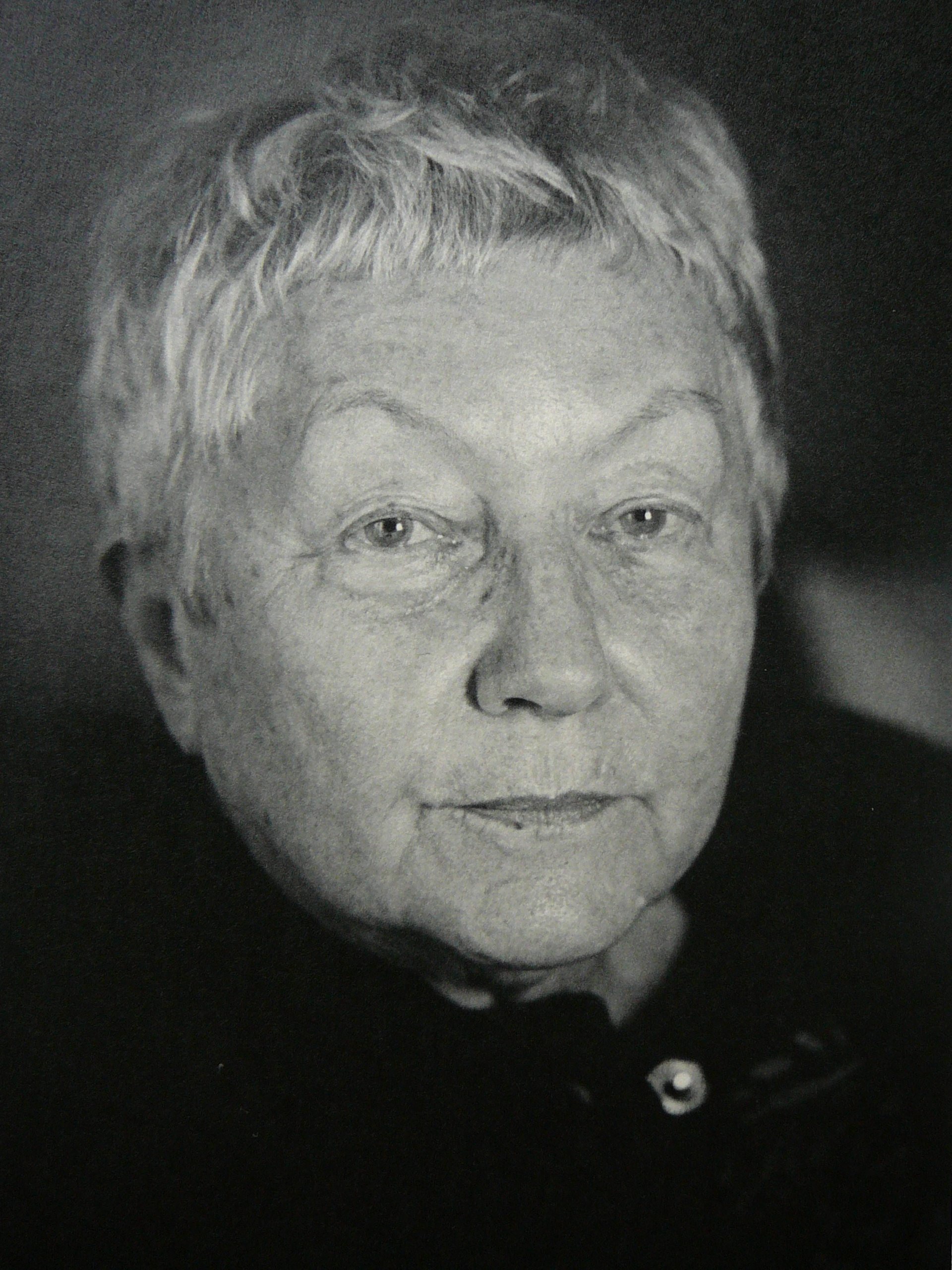
- Chalut in 2007
- Born: Annette Brigitte Weill; 29 April 1924; Paris, France
- Died: 8 November 2021 (aged 97); Paris, France
- Military career
- Allegiance: France
- Unit: French Resistance
- Conflicts: Second World War

Annette Brigitte Chalut (née Weill; 29 April 1924 – 8 November 2021) was a French physician who was a member of the French Resistance during the Second World War.

== Biography ==
Annette Weill was born in April 1924 in Paris, to a Jewish family, the daughter of Pierre Weill, a veteran of the First World War, and his wife, Emma Alexandre. On the outbreak of war, Pierre became an interpreter for the British Army. He was arrested in December 1941 but released in March 1942, reputedly based on the intervention of his wife. The family decided to leave for the free region of France.

At Toulouse, Annette succeeded in passing her PCB exams, the first step toward obtaining a medical qualification. Along with her father, she joined the Resistance. After a time, the Germans invaded this region of France also.

Pierre was arrested again, this time along with his daughter, and she was imprisoned at Fort de Romainville. On 13 May 1944, she was transported to Ravensbrück concentration camp. From there she was sent on to Hannover-Limmer concentration camp, which began operation in August 1944; there, she was forced to work on the manufacture of gas masks.

Finally, she was sent to Bergen-Belsen, where she survived until the liberation of 15 April 1945. At this point she was in poor health, weighing only 35 kilos; nevertheless she volunteered to remain behind to help treat those whose suffering was even greater.

After the war she married and completed her medical qualifications. She became a general practitioner and a member of the Medico-Social Commission of the Concours national de la résistance et de la déportation. From 1992 on, she served as a member of the International Ravensbrück Committee, and was its president from 1999 to 2015.

In 2015, Chalut returned to Ravensbrück in Germany to take a leading role in the celebrations commemorating the liberation of the concentration camp there. On 1 January 2016, she was awarded the rank of grand officier of the Légion d’honneur.

Chalut died on 8 November 2021, at the age of 97.
