= Jacques Poirier =

French painter

Jacques Poirier (1928–2002) was a French master painter who lived in Paris near Saint-Germain-des-Prés. His mother was a painter so he claimed with irony that he always sniffed turpentine between breastfeeds. He joined the École Supérieure des Beaux-Arts de Paris in 1945. Poirier came to painting quite late after a successful career as an illustrator . His paintings were done in the realist trompe-l'œil style with a mastery and a poetry rarely seen in this genre. He became a member of "Trompe-l'œil and Reality", the group of realist painters created by Henri Cadiou. His good friend fr:Pierre Gilou shared in a comment how Poirier was quickly accepted in the group back in 1970.

== Painting style ==
Jacques Poirier was a contemplative and although his subjects included a bric-a-brac of objects, antiques and other improbable unusable curiosities displayed in ever complex settings, the true subject of his art was natural light and the contemplation of its magical glow. His canvas included riddles and humour -sometimes self-deriding-.

Many of his riddles are rebuses, and the simplest are transliterated in the title (e.g. Pourquoi Faire Simple, Le Discours De La Méthode, Petit Hommage A Ce Beau Sexe Tant Chéri etc.). Others are significantly more complex and long. Histoire D'H would be a good example of such an elaborate painting. Starting with the title, we can note on the humoristic side that the capital letter "H" can be interpreted as standing for "Histoire avec un grand H" –History, spelled with a capital H- the expression French speakers use when they want to signify that a given story is significant historically. The title "Histoire D’H" can therefore be seen as humoristic when it is appreciated in a self-referring sense. Naturally, in addition, capital "H" in the title is also a direct reference to Hélène of Troy (Helen of Troy) since this painting re-tells at great length her story, in block letters, starting with L-N-N-É-O-P-Y, translating "Hélène was born in Greek land", ending with blocks showing L-Y-E-D-C and a dice (sounding "D" in French), the end translating "she died there" (see alphabet parlant), as a conclusion to the story (with many more details in between). Another of his paintings, Chanson D'Automne, is the transliteration of a famous poem by Paul Verlaine (same title).

Poirier's rebuses come often witty with multiple levels of translation and understanding. His work Artnica (a play on Arnica) is an example. It is a life size crossword puzzle grid, where words are spelled with objects arranged in wooden boxes. Poirier included a dictionary titled La Rousse & Le Robert illustrated by the famous Gabrielle d'Estrée a bare breasted redhead woman. The dictionary's cover page translates pictorially "La Rousse & Le Robert" since "la rousse" means redhead woman (Gabrielle D'Estrée) and "roberts" is old fashioned French slang for breast. Further, the title itself is a joke that associates the names of the two most common rival French language dictionaries Larousse and Robert.

== Exhibitions ==
Jacques Poirier was represented in Paris by the Alain Daune Gallery and then the Galerie Michelle Boulet. His paintings can be seen in Lyon at the Galerie Saint Hubert . Reproductions of his art have found their way online and his works rarely appear in auctions .

In 2009, one of his masterpieces Artnica was featured during the exhibit "Art and Illusions. Masterpieces of Trompe-l'œil From Antiquity to the Present Day" held in Florence, Italy at the Palazzo Strozzi. In November 20, 2009 New York Times review entitled "What Is Real, What Isn't" Roderick Conway Morris wrote: "Jacques Poirier’s “Artnica” (1997), an astonishing, visually and linguistically ingenious, modern cabinet of bric-a-brac, in which the objects, depicted with photographic accuracy, form an intricate crossword puzzle".
