= Ybry =

French luxury perfume and fashion house

Ybry BrandConcern B.V.
- Type: Privately held
- Industry: Perfumery / Fashion
- Founded: 1925 / 2005
- Founder: Simon Jarosslawski
- Headquarters: 23 Herengracht, Amsterdam, the Netherlands
- Number of locations: Worldwide online presence
- Area served: Worldwide
- Products: Luxury goods
- Website: www.ybry.com

Ybry is a French luxury perfume and fashion house founded in 1925 by Simon Jaroslawski. It formerly resided at 6 rue Ybry, Neuilly (Seine). In 2005 the brand was revitalized and the trademark and original bottle designs were filed for international protection. Amanda Witteman is the company's spokesmodel.

== History ==
Simon Jaroslawski, a respected 'nose' (perfumer) in the perfume industry, pioneered the (then) modern abstract geometric design for his bottles. He held very strong artistic views. He created perfumes for the emancipated young women of the era. A distinguishing feature of the Ybry line are the bottle designs. Ybry also had an office in New York City. Ybry perfumes were advertised as being "the most expensive in the world". During the Great Depression the unemployment and panic in the United States had a chilling effect on the fortunes of the French luxury trades. The production costs of the prestigious and luxurious Ybry creations weakened the financial position of the company and Simon Jaroslawski fell into personal bankruptcy in 1932. The original Ybry brand continued to exist in the USA until the 1940s.

== Products ==
=== Cooperation with Lalique and Baccarat ===
Jaroslawski collaborated with Baccarat bottle design but commissioned Lalique to create the Art Nouveau glass medallions. Baccarat produced the classic Ybry perfume bottle, a flattened square in colored crystal. The bottles consisted of white crystal overlaid with colored crystal to create a unique luminescent opacity. Each color delineated a specific perfume and a different gem. The colors include red, jet black, slag green to darker green, orange to butterscotch, and deep purple to lavender. The bottles generally included matching enameled and gilded metal covers. The covers were placed over stoppers at an angle on one corner of the bottle. The atomizers were given either chrome or gilt brass hardware. The colored bottles came with round, gold foil embossed labels, the black bottles with square, silver foil embossed labels. This bottle received a patent granted on 1925. The bottles ranged in size from 7 7/8" tall down to diminutive sample sizes of 1 3/8" tall. The presentation boxes were covered with fine leather and often had color-coordinated small triangular segments and luxurious silk tassels. Other boxes looked like little suitcases and were covered in suede, and held multiple presentations, such as three bottles and two atomizers. Another rare example held two bottles, one atomizer and a Lalique medallion attached to the case with a silk tassel.

=== The vintage perfumes of the Ybry line ===
- 1925 Mon Ame
- 1925 Femmes de Paris
- 1927 Desir du Coeur
- 1927 Devinez
- 1928 Les Bourgeons
- 1929 Amour Sauvage
- 1929 Les Fleurs d'Ybry
- 1929 Un Soir de Ma Vie
- 1931 Toujours l'Amaint
- 1932 L'Amour Toujours
- 1935 Joie de Vivre
- 1935 Hearts Desire
- 1939 Odorade
- 1939 Old Fashion Garden
- 1940 French Bouquet
- 1940 Eau de Cologne
- 1940 French Cologne
- 1940 Naturelle
- 1940 Honeysuckle
- 1940 Wild Daphne
- 1942 Palo Alto
- 1944 The Buds
- Infusion de Fleurs
- Mon desir

=== The relaunch ===
The perfumes Amour Sauvage, Femme de Paris, Desire du Cœur, Mon Ame, Devinez and Ruban Rose (Pink Ribbon) are offered in coloured crystal bottles with engraved and enamelled square brass toppers. Each perfume has a different colour bottle, black for Amour Sauvage emerald green for Femme de Paris, ruby red for Desir du Coeur, amethyst for Mon Ame, coral for Devinez and pink for Ruban Rose. The Ruban Rose was released in dedication to breast cancer survivors and victims.

== Current activities ==
Specializing in luxury goods (haute couture, ready-to-wear, handbags, perfumery, cosmetics, etc.), the YBRY label is striving to become a recognized name in the fashion industry.

== Kapsule the Lagerfeld imitation ==
In August 2008 Karl Lagerfeld introduced Kapsule to the luxury perfume market. Although Luz Herrmann and Karl Lagerfeld claim original design, the bottle is an exact copy of the famous Ybry bottles.
