= 1926 in France =

- Decades: 1900s; 1910s; 1920s; 1930s; 1940s
- See also: History of France; Timeline of French history; List of years in France

Events from the year 1926 in France.

== Incumbents ==
- President: Gaston Doumergue
- President of the Council of Ministers:
  - until 20 July: Aristide Briand
  - 20 July-23 July: Édouard Herriot
  - starting 23 July: Raymond Poincaré

== Events ==
- 9 May – French navy bombards Damascus because of Druze riots.
- 15 July – Grand Mosque of Paris inaugurated.
- 24 November – The village of Rocquebillier on the Riviera is almost destroyed in a massive hailstorm.
- The Guide Michelin first awards stars to restaurants.

== Arts and literature ==
- Société Nationale des Beaux-Arts institutes the Prix Puvis de Chavannes, named after co-founder and first president, Pierre Puvis de Chavannes.

== Sport ==
- 20 June – Tour de France begins.
- 18 July – Tour de France ends, won by Lucien Buysse of Belgium.

== Births ==
=== January to June ===
- 17 January – Robert Filliou, artist (died 1987)
- 2 February – Philippe Chatrier, tennis player (died 2000)
- 7 February – Pierre Villette, composer (died 1998)
- 11 February – Paul Bocuse, chef (died 2018)
- 19 February – Pierre Guénin, journalist, gay rights activist (died 2017)
- 1 March – Robert Clary, French-American actor, author and lecturer (died 2022)
- 19 March – Henri René Guieu, science fiction writer (died 2000)
- 13 April – André Testut, motor racing driver (died 2005)
- 8 May – Pierre Broué, historian and Trotskyist (died 2005)
- 5 June – Claude Berge, mathematician (died 2002)
- 12 June – Jean-Pierre Munch, cyclist (died 1996)
- 26 June – Jérôme Lejeune, paediatrician and geneticist (died 1994)

=== July to December ===
- 6 July – Serge Roullet, film director and screenwriter (died 2023)
- 18 July – Bernard Pons, politician (died 2022)
- 26 July – Monique Pelletier, politician (died 2025)
- 10 August – Michel Breitman, writer and translator (died 2009)
- 14 August – René Goscinny, author, editor and humorist (died 1977)
- 16 August – Roger Agache, archaeologist (died 2011)
- 17 August
  - Maurice Lusien, swimmer (died 2017)
  - Jean Poiret, actor, director and screenwriter (died 1992)
- 15 September – Jean-Pierre Serre, mathematician
- 17 September – Jean-Marie Lustiger, Roman Catholic Archbishop of Paris and cardinal (died 2007)
- 15 October – Michel Foucault, philosopher, historian, critic and sociologist (died 1984)
- 1 November – James Marson, politician (died 2017)
- 3 November – Paul Rebeyrolle, painter (died 2005)
- 9 November – Raymond Hains, artist and photographer (died 2005)
- 2 December – Armand Avril, painter and sculptor died 2025)
- 12 December – Étienne-Émile Baulieu, biochemist (died 2025)
- 21 December – Georges Boudarel, academic and Communist militant (died 2003)

== Deaths ==
- 14 January – René Boylesve, author (born 1867)
- 28 February – Alphonse Louis Nicolas Borrelly, astronomer (born 1842)
- 26 March – Georges Aaron Bénédite, Egyptologist (born 1857)
- 2 July – Émile Coué, psychologist and pharmacist (born 1857)
- 21 September – Léon Charles Thévenin, telegraph engineer (born 1857)
- 30 September – Agnès Souret, model, "la plus belle femme de France" (peritonitis in Argentina) (born 1902)
- 5 December – Claude Monet, painter (born 1840)
- Date unknown – Jean-Camille Formigé, architect (born 1845)

== See also ==
- List of French films of 1926
