= Auguste Defauconpret =

French man of letters

Auguste Jean-Baptiste Defauconpret (1767, Lille – 1843) was a French man of letters.

Initially a lawyer, Defauconpret relocated to England where he wrote some now forgotten novels. However, he became well known for his translations into French of English-language novels, particularly those of Walter Scott and James Fenimore Cooper, although he modified the text of The Last of the Mohicans to be more favorable to the French.

== Biography ==
In 1786, he won the honorary prize in the University’s general competition. A few years later, while working as a notary in Paris, he lost part of his fortune in ill-fated business ventures and soon left a profession that did not suit him well to retire to London. During his stay in England, which lasted no less than twenty-five years, he devoted himself entirely to his literary pursuits, publishing—in collaboration with his son Charles Auguste (December 19, 1797–December 1865), headmaster of the École Sainte-Barbe (which became the Collège Rollin in 1830) from 1829 to 1864—more than four hundred volumes of various translations of high quality (despite the haste with which they were produced), which earned him a great reputation in France.

He wrote A New Scale, or Tables Converting Ancient Coins and Measures into Corresponding Republican Coins and Measures (1799–1805) and Anecdotes on the Court and the Inner Circle of the Napoleon Family (1818), published works depicting English customs (Fifteen Days in London at the End of 1815 in 1817, A Year in London in 1819), and composed historical novels heavily inspired by Walter Scott, including Jeanne Maillotte, or the Heroine of Lille (1824), Wat Tyler, or Ten Days of Revolt (1825), Masaniello (1827), and Robert Fitzooth, nicknamed Robin Hood, or the Leader of the Outlaws (1829).

But he is best known for his translations from English.

He translated, among other works, the complete works of Walter Scott and James Fenimore Cooper, as well as a large number of works by other British authors, including John Banim, Edward Bulwer-Lytton, Charles Dickens, Maria Edgeworth, Henry Fielding, Thomas Gaspey, Ben Jonson, Frederick Marryat, James Justinian Morier, Ann Radcliffe, Horace Smith, Laurence Sterne, and the American Washington Irving.

== Bibliography ==
- 1951 paper on Fenimore Cooper by Willard Thorp
