= Gustave Charles Fagniez =

French historian and archivist

Gustave Fagniez
- Born: 6 October 1842; Paris, France
- Died: 18 June 1927 (aged 84); Meudon, France
- Spouse: Pauline Lejeune (1851–1936)
- Children: Gabriel Fagniez (1870–1927), Charles Fagniez (1874–1952), Alice Fagniez (1878–1894)
- Parent(s): Charles Fagniez (1800–1880) and Marie-Gabrielle Beschefer de Vaugency (1815–1871)

Gustave Fagniez (6 October 1842 – 18 June 1927) was a French historian, a member of the Académie des Sciences Morales et Politiques of the Institut de France.

His work focused on the economy and society of the Ancien Régime, as well as diplomatic history during the 17th century, particularly the reigns of Louis XIII and Cardinal Richelieu.

== Biography ==
=== Early life and education ===
Gustave Fagniez was born into a family originally from Arras, which prospered in banking during the Bourbon Restoration. The family moved to Paris, settling in the Chaussée d'Antin neighborhood. Liberal Orléanists, the Fagniez family included bankers, legal advisers, and a counselor at the Court of Accounts. His mother hosted a salon frequented by intellectuals such as Jules Simon, Paul Janet, Charles de Rémusat, Lucien-Anatole Prévost-Paradol, and the Goncourt brothers. Influenced by Eugène Despois, his teacher at Lycée Louis-le-Grand, as well as writer Jules Simon and journalist Auguste Nefftzer, founder of the Temps, Fagniez adopted Republican convictions.

Abandoning the family law practice, Gustave Fagniez entered the École nationale des chartes in 1864, where he studied under historian Jules Quicherat. He graduated in 1867 with a thesis titled L'Organisation du travail industriel à Paris aux XIIIe et XIVe siècles. At the École pratique des hautes études, he encountered historian Gabriel Monod.

Appointed archivist at the Archives of the Empire in 1869, his career began with the publication of his thesis under the title Études sur l’industrie et la classe industrielle à Paris aux XIIIe et XIVe siècles (1877). This work, composed largely of unpublished documents, opened up a new field of study and became a reference for over fifty years. Romanist Gaston Paris praised it as "a remarkable piece of scholarship that brought the history of 13th- and 14th-century Paris to life."

Twenty years later he supplemented this book by a collection of Documents relatifs à l'histoire de l'industrie et du commerce en France (2 volumes, 1898–1900), and in 1897 he published L'économie sociale de la France sous Henri IV, a volume containing the results of very minute research. He did not, however, confine himself to economic history. His Le Père Joseph et Richelieu (1894), though somewhat frigid and severe, is based on a mass of unpublished information, and shows remarkable psychological grasp.

=== Founding of the Revue historique (1876) ===
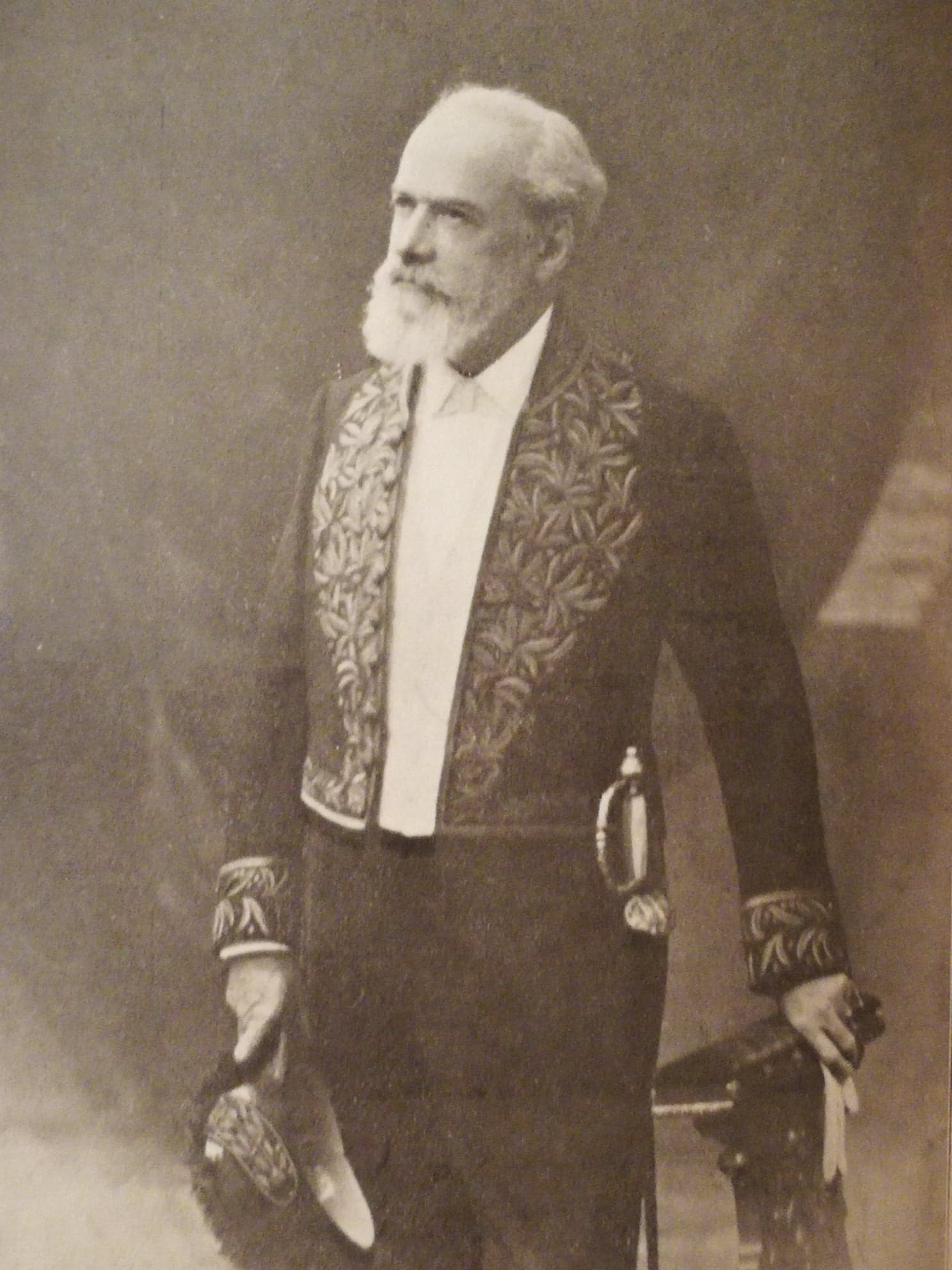
Gustave Fagniez portrait

In 1876, Gustave Fagniez co-founded the Revue historique with Gabriel Monod. The journal’s first article is considered the manifesto of the methodical school of history. Fagniez later compiled articles on diplomatic history into his two-volume Le Père Joseph et Richelieu, which won the Grand prix Gobert in 1895.

Fagniez resigned from the Revue historique in 1881, protesting its attacks on the Church. He eventually joined the conservative Revue des questions historiques.

=== Later years ===
By the late 19th century, personal tragedies, including the death of his daughter Alice in 1894, led Fagniez to embrace his Catholic faith. He collaborated on social reform projects such as workers’ unions and urban gardens. Fagniez also became involved with the monarchist Action Française, contributing to its educational effort the Institut d'Action française.

Gustave Fagniez was elected to the Académie des Sciences Morales et Politiques in 1901 and served as its president in 1913. His body of work is celebrated for its rigor and historical depth.

== Publications ==
- Études sur l’industrie et la classe industrielle à Paris aux XIIIe et XIVe siècles (1877)
- Le Père Joseph et Richelieu (1894)
- L'Économie sociale de la France sous Henri IV (1897)
- Corporations et syndicats (1904)
- La Femme et la société française dans la première moitié du XVIIe siècle (1929)
