= 1929 in France =

- Decades: 1900s; 1910s; 1920s; 1930s; 1940s
- See also: History of France; Timeline of French history; List of years in France

Events from the year 1929 in France.

== Incumbents ==
- President: Gaston Doumergue
- President of the Council of Ministers:
  - until 29 July: Raymond Poincaré
  - 29 July-2 November: Aristide Briand
  - starting 2 November: André Tardieu

== Events ==
- 24 July – Prime Minister Raymond Poincaré resigns for medical reasons – he is succeeded by Aristide Briand.
- 24 July – The Kellogg–Briand Pact, renouncing war as an instrument of foreign policy, goes into effect (it was first signed in Paris on 27 August 1928 by most leading world powers).
- 5 September – Briand presents his plan of the United States of Europe.
- 22 October – Briand's government falls.

== Arts and literature ==
- 15 January – First issue of Annales d'histoire économique et sociale published in by Armand Colin.
- October
  - Jean-Paul Sartre and Simone de Beauvoir become a couple, having met for the first time while he studied at the École Normale Supérieure in Paris. 21-year-old De Beauvoir becomes the youngest person ever to obtain the agrégation in philosophy, and comes second in the final examination, beaten only by Sartre.
  - La galerie Goemans opens in Paris with a Surrealist exhibition including Yves Tanguy.

== Sport ==
- 30 June – Tour de France begins.
- 28 July – Tour de France ends, won by Maurice De Waele of Belgium.

== Births ==
=== January to June ===
- 20 January – Jean-Jacques Perrey, electronic music producer (died 2016)
- 5 February – Luc Ferrari, composer (died 2005)
- 6 February – Pierre Brice, actor (died 2015)
- 7 February – François Fontan, politician (died 1979)
- 8 February – Claude Rich, actor and screenwriter (died 2017)
- 10 February
  - Bertrand Poirot-Delpech, journalist, essayist and novelist (died 2006)
  - Christine Renard, fantasy writer (died 1979)
- 19 February – Jacques Deray, film director (died 2003)
- 26 March – Charles Dumont, singer-songwriter (died 2024)
- 7 April – Bob Denard, mercenary (died 2007)
- 8 April – François Bruhat, mathematician (died 2007)
- 23 April – George Steiner, literary critic and philosopher (died 2020)
- 26 April – Louis Erlo, stage director and theatre manager (died 2026)
- 1 May – Valentin Huot, racing cyclist (died 2017)
- 2 May – Édouard Balladur, prime minister (died 2026)
- 3 May – Gabriel Garran, actor and theatre director (died 2022)
- 31 May – Joseph Bernardo, Olympic swimmer (died 2023)
- 27 June – Maurice Couve de Murville, Roman Catholic Archbishop of Birmingham (died 2007)

=== July to December ===
- 6 July – Hélène Carrère d'Encausse, historian (died 2023)
- 13 July – René Laloux, animator and film director (died 2004)
- 15 July – Alain Porthault, sprinter (died 2019)
- 16 July – Gaby Tanguy, swimmer (died 1981)
- 29 July – Jean Baudrillard, philosopher and sociologist (died 2007)
- 9 September – Claude Nougaro, singer and songwriter (died 2004)
- 21 September – Georges Bernier, also known as Le Professeur Choron, humorist (died 2005)
- 19 October – Henri Cueco, painter (died 2017)
- 23 October – Josy Moinet, politician (died 2018)
- 4 November - Jean Delahaye cyclist (died 2017)
- 11 November – Gwenc'hlan Le Scouëzec, writer and Grand Druid of Brittany (died 2008)
- 20 November – Raymond Lefèvre, orchestra leader, arranger and composer (died 2008)
- 7 December – Gilles Thomas, science fiction writer (died 1985)

== Deaths ==
=== January to June ===
- 21 January – Étienne Aymonier, linguist, explorer and archaeologist (born 1844)
- 30 January – La Goulue, dancer (born 1866)
- 19 February – Joseph Valentin Boussinesq, mathematician and physicist (born 1842)
- 15 March – Félix Balzer, physician (born 1849)
- 20 March – Ferdinand Foch, Marshal of France, military theorist and writer (born 1851)
- 22 April – Henry Lerolle, painter, art collector and patron (born 1848)
- 24 April – Caroline Rémy de Guebhard, socialist, journalist and feminist (born 1855)
- 25 June – Charles-Victor Langlois, historian and paleographer (born 1863)

=== July to December ===
- 10 August – Pierre Fatou, mathematician (born 1878)
- 23 September – Louis-Ernest Dubois, Roman Catholic cardinal and Archbishop of Paris (born 1856)
- 1 October – Antoine Bourdelle, sculptor (born 1861)
- 24 November – Georges Clemenceau, statesman, physician, journalist and Prime Minister (born 1841)
- 20 December – Émile Loubet, politician and 7th President of France (born 1838)
- 21 December – Gustave Belot, professor and philosopher (born 1859)

== See also ==
- List of French films of 1929
