= Célanie Carissan =

French composer and pianist (1843–1927)

- Born: Marie-Charlotte-Élisabeth Célanie Carissan; 13 February 1843; Nantes, Pays de la Loire, France
- Died: 30 November 1927 (aged 84); Neuilly-sur-Seine, Île-de-France, France
- Occupations: Composer, writer, pianist
- Writing career
- Pen name: E. de Nassirac

Célanie Carissan (13 February 1843 – 30 November 1927) was a French composer, writer and pianist.

== Biography ==
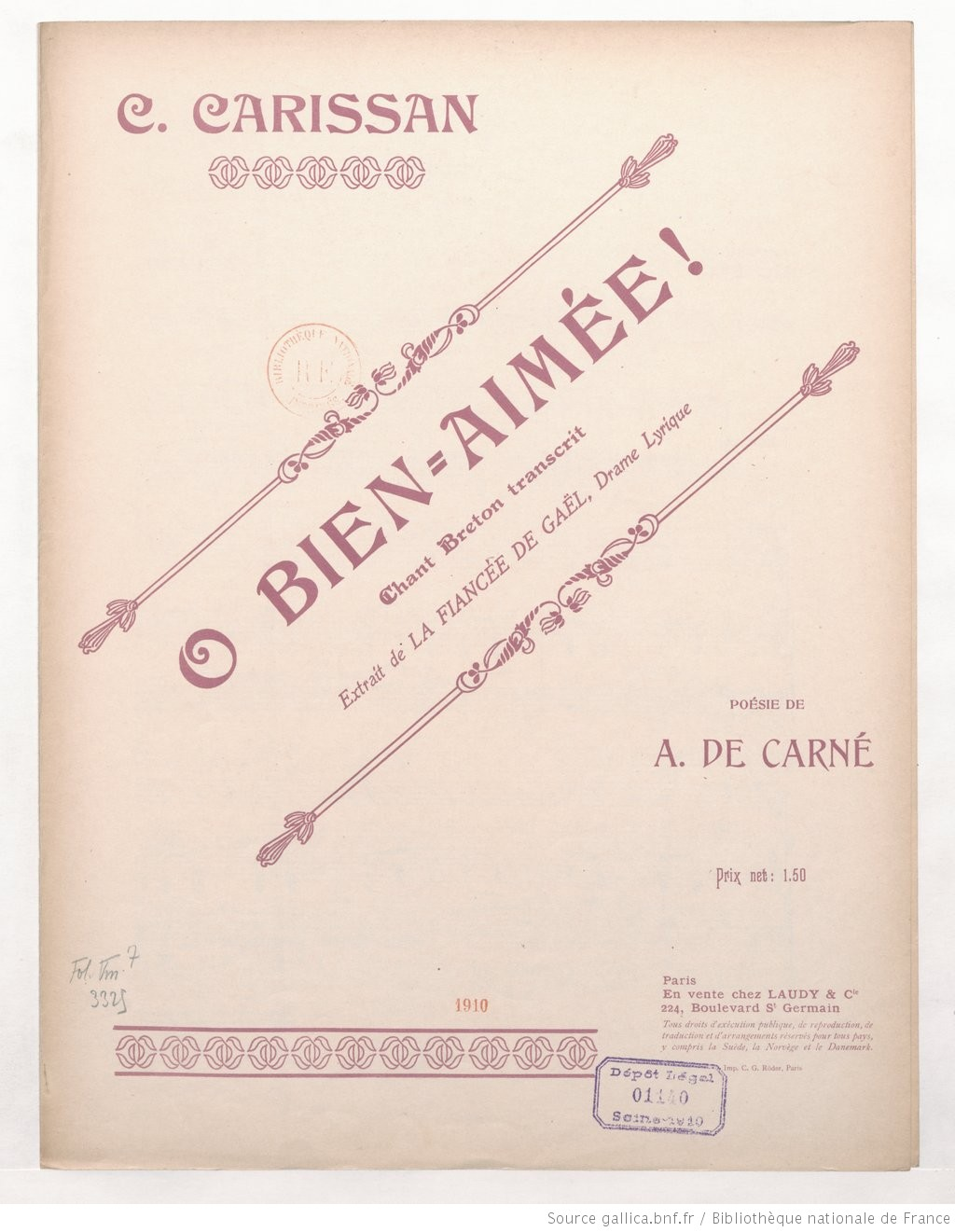
Cover of Ô bien-aimée by Célanie Carissan, an excerpt from La Fiancée de Gaël.

Marie-Charlotte-Élisabeth Célanie Carissan was born on 13 February 1843 in Nantes to Creole parents. Her father Eugène Carissan was a professor at the Ecole Supérieure des Lettres, Sciences et Arts in Nantes.

During a concert at the Société nationale de musique on 10 January 1891, two of Carissan's works, Écho and Chanson de l'abeille, were performed at the Salle Pleyel in Paris. The same year, her La Fiancée de Gaël, based on a poem by Adrien de Carné with Breton influences, was performed in Nantes and Paris. Sonneur de Bretagne critic Sullian Collin praised the use of Breton themes and stated that Carissan had "made excellent use" of it.

Carissan collaborated with Adrien de Carné and Théophile Gautier. For her own melodies, she often set music to poems by Thibaut de Champagne, Thomas Moore and Alphonse de Lamartine, including the libretto Rebecca inspired by the Book of Genesis. This piece was written for soloists, choirs and orchestra and is divided into eight scenes. She released it under the pseudonym E. de Nassirac, Carissan backwards. It was performed in Paris several times during 1893 at the Salle Érard and received critical acclaim at its premiere. The score also exists in reduction for voice and piano.

In 1893, she was invited to exhibit her works at the Palais des Femmes during the World's Columbian Exposition in Chicago, along with Augusta Holmès, Cécile Chaminade and Gabrielle Ferrari.

Carissan died on 30 November 1927, at the age of 84.
