= 1963 in France =

- Decades: 1940s; 1950s; 1960s; 1970s; 1980s
- See also: History of France; Timeline of French history; List of years in France

Events from the year 1963 in France.

== Incumbents ==
- President: Charles de Gaulle
- Prime Minister: Georges Pompidou

== Events ==
- 22 January – Élysée Treaty signed by Charles de Gaulle and Konrad Adenauer.
- 29 January – President Charles de Gaulle vetoes the United Kingdom's entry into the EEC.
- 4 March – In Paris, 6 people are sentenced to death for conspiring to assassinate President Charles de Gaulle. De Gaulle pardons 5 of them but the other conspirator is executed by firing squad few days later.
- 15 June – Carrefour open Europe's first hypermarket, in Sainte-Geneviève-des-Bois, Essonne.

== Sport ==
- 23 June – Tour de France begins.
- 14 July – Tour de France ends, won by Jacques Anquetil.

== Births ==
=== January to March ===
- 1 January – Jean-Marc Gounon, motor racing driver
- 6 January – Philippe Perrin, French Air Force officer, test pilot, and astronaut
- 7 January – Christian Louboutin, shoe designer
- 23 January – Éric Mura, soccer player
- 9 February – Lolo Ferrari, dancer, porn star, actress, and singer (died 2000)
- 24 February – Laurent Ruquier, journalist and television and radio host
- 19 March – Manu Bertin, one of the pioneers of Kite surfing
- 21 March – Thierry Froger, soccer manager, former player

=== April to June ===
- 6 April – Pauline Lafont, actress (died 1988)
- 7 April – Bernard Lama, soccer player
- 20 April – Laurent Lhardit, politician
- 23 April – Paul Belmondo, motor racing driver
- 25 April – Pascal of Bollywood, singer
- 28 April – Sandrine Dumas, actress
- 8 May – Michel Gondry, Academy Award-winning screenwriter, film, commercial and music video director
- 10 May – Patrice Kuchna, tennis player
- 20 May – Gérald J. Caussé, a general authority of the Church of Jesus Christ of Latter-day Saints
- 24 May – Ludovic Batelli, soccer player and manager
- 28 May – Marc Antoine, jazz fusion guitarist
- 30 May – Élise Lucet, investigative journalist and television host
- 3 June – Andrée Taurinya, politician
- 4 June – Nicolas Boukhrief, screenwriter, film director and actor
- 7 June – Roberto Alagna, operatic tenor
- 8 June – Agnes Clancier, novelist
- 12 June – Philippe Bugalski, rally driver (died 2012)
- 13 June – Nathalie Lupino, judoka and Olympic medallist
- 17 June – Christophe Barratier, film producer, film director and screenwriter
- 18 June – Christian Vadim, actor
- 25 June – Thierry Marie, cyclist

=== July to September ===
- 4 July – Henri Leconte, tennis player
- 7 July – Pascal Payet, criminal
- 10 July – Ronan Pensec, cyclist
- 12 July – Thierry Tulasne, tennis player
- 30 July – Benjamin de Rothschild, banker (died 2021 in Switzerland)
- 13 August – Édouard Michelin, businessman (died 2006)
- 14 August – Christophe Arleston, scenarist and editor
- 14 August – Emmanuelle Béart, actress
- 23 August – Marie-Christine Cazier, athlete
- 31 August – Sylvain Kastendeuch, soccer player
- 7 September – Éric Di Meco, politician, former soccer player
- 8 September – Éric Poulat, soccer referee and computer scientist

=== October to December ===
- 28 October – Christian Plaziat, decathlete
- 1 November – Philippe Lucas, soccer player
- 5 November – Jean-Pierre Papin, soccer manager, former player
- 10 November –
  - Sophie Amiach, tennis player
  - Sylvain Chomet, animator and film director
- 15 November – François Lemasson, soccer player
- November – Pascal Parisot, songwriter and singer
- 2 December – Éric Boyer, cyclist
- 13 December – Philippe Collet, pole vaulter
- 18 December
  - Olivier Broche, actor and producer
  - Pauline Ester, singer
- 22 December – Christophe Lavainne, cyclist
- 28 December – Béatrice Uria-Monzon, mezzo-soprano (died 2025)
- 30 December – Xavier Mauméjean, writer

=== Full date unknown ===
- Gilles Bourdos, film director, screenwriter and producer
- Stéphane Derenoncourt, oenologist
- Sophie Lacaze, composer
- Jean-Yves Malmasson, composer and conductor
- Pierre Maubouché, actor, voice over artist, producer and casting director
- Xavier Veilhan, artist

== Deaths ==
=== January to March ===
- 23 January – Gustave Garrigou, cyclist and 1911 Tour de France winner (born 1884)
- 30 January – Francis Poulenc, composer (born 1899)
- 9 February – Marcel Godivier, cyclist (born 1887)
- 10 February – Louis Paulhan, pilot (born 1883)
- 4 March – Édouard Belin, photographic inventor (born 1876)
- 10 March – André Maschinot, soccer player (born 1903)
- 11 March – Jean Bastien-Thiry, attempted assassin of President Charles de Gaulle in 1962 (born 1927)
- 26 March – Pierre Lacau, Egyptologist and philologist (born 1873)
- 29 March – Henry Bordeaux, writer and lawyer (born 1870)

=== April to June ===
- 10 May – Léonce Crenier, Roman Catholic monk and theologian (born 1888)
- 1 June – Yves le Prieur, naval officer and inventor (born 1885)
- 3 June – Edmond Decottignies, weightlifter and Olympic gold medallist (born 1893)
- 8 June – Gaston Ramon, veterinarian and biologist (born 1886)
- 9 June – Jacques Villon, painter and printmaker (born 1875)

=== July to September ===
- 1 July – Camille Chautemps, politician and three times Prime Minister of France (born 1885)
- 7 July – Géo-Charles, poet (born 1892)
- 31 August – Georges Braque, painter and sculptor (born 1882)
- 6 September – Jules Isaac, historian (born 1877)
- 11 September – Suzanne Duchamp, painter (born 1889)
- 22 September – Bernadette Cattanéo, trade unionist, communist activist, newspaper editor (born 1899)

=== October to December ===
- 10 October – Édith Piaf, singer (born 1915)
- 11 October – Jean Cocteau, poet, novelist, dramatist, designer and filmmaker (born 1889)
- 17 October – Jacques Hadamard, mathematician (born 1865)
- 21 October – Jean Decoux, Governor-General of French Indochina (born 1884)
- 25 October – Roger Désormière, conductor (born 1898)
- 11 November – André Le Troquer, politician and lawyer (born 1884)

=== Full date unknown ===
- René Baudichon, sculptor and medallist (born 1878)
- René Guyon, jurist (born 1876)

== See also ==
- List of French films of 1963
