= Parisot =

Parisot may refer to:

== People ==
- Aldo Parisot (1918–2018), Brazilian-born American cellist and cello teacher
- Dean Parisot (born 1952), Academy Award winning American film and television director
- Jean Parisot de Valette (1494–1568), Grand Master of the Knights Hospitaller from 1557
- Laurence Parisot (born 1959), head of the French MEDEF employers' union since 2005
- Mademoiselle Parisot (1775–after 1837), a French ballet dancer
- Pascal Parisot (born 1963), French songwriter and singer
- Patrick Parisot, Canadian former ambassador to Algeria

== Places in France ==
- Parisot, Tarn, a commune in the Tarn department
- Parisot, Tarn-et-Garonne, a commune in the Tarn-et-Garonne department

== Other ==
- Parisot (horse), thoroughbred racehorse that won 1796 Epsom Oaks
