= Léonce Crenier =

French monk

Léonce Crenier (1888 – May 10, 1963) was a Catholic monk who promoted the theological-political concept of precarity.

== Early years ==
Léonce Crenier was born in Ceton, a small village of the diocese of Séez, in Savoie, France, July 31, 1888. According to his "Autobiographical Notes", his father was made bankrupt and consequently reduced to the condition of a day labourer, living in a tiny room. His mother "was a woman full of idealism and hope, energetic and of excellent heart". Léonce much admired her and inherited many of her characteristics. There was little discussion of religion in the home. Although baby Léonce was baptized, his parents were not church goers. His mother "fell out with the priest and vowed not to set the foot in the church again". She continually and enthusiastically evoked "Our Lord and his Mother" as evocative of a "life of love".

Léonce received his first Communion at twelve years of age, but he stopped attending church and did not attend for Confirmation. He was a sickly student but nevertheless attained excellent result thanks to his sharp intelligence. Acute otitis in his left ear made him partially deaf for the rest of his life. After finishing at college (a rigorous high school), he became a tax-collector in an obscure corner of France. He studied at the "National School of Horticulture" in Versailles from 1908 to 1911. He became absorbed with introspection, with a fascination with questions of existence and further such mysteries, with an enthusiasm for the occult being manifested at an early age. However he was finally disillusioned with what he regarded as pseudo-knowledge.

In Versailles and Paris he realised the horror of social inequality, the misery of the proletariat and the misdeeds of capitalism. Unable to stand by, he participated in the militant socialist movement, particularly with the Anarcho-Communists. Actually, the anarchism of these young utopians did not present any great danger to the established order. Rejecting violence, this group prepared for the social world of which they dreamed, by much discussion, wrote inflammatory texts, festooned the streets with posters. Until his death, Father Crenier had fond memories of the companions of his militant youth.

== Conversion to Catholicism ==
In 1913, he felt obliged to join his sister and brother-in-law in Portugal, where he for long of heart remained for seven years. Suffering from a particularly malignant form of typhoid fever, with "violent pains started in the hip and the thigh bones, which twisted and were folded in on themselves. Soon, my right leg, become enormous and twisted back". He was worried that he might "go insane if the pain didn't leave him. The doctors could not do anything more for him. His life would undoubtedly have finished on a bed of hospital of Lisbon had it not been for the intervention of Sister Marie Moutte, of the congregation of Sisters of St Vincent de Paul. She took on the young patient, looking after him with patience and knowledge, such that life forces gradually returned to him along with the hope to survive. Such devotion intrigued him, and he wanted to know its secret. Sister Marie explained to him that such a secret was not to be found in her but in Christ whose example she did her best to follow. "He remained in bed for months, devoting himself to prayer, reading and reflection." His discussions with Sister Marie, alongside meditation on the Gospel, and study of Saint John of the Cross that led to conversion to Catholicism.

This embrace of Christianity led him to decide to devote his life to religion. Initially he approached the Lazarites who politely got rid of him for obvious reasons. He later wrote "I was, weak, deaf, lame and almost voiceless". Thereafter, at the summer 1919, a chance meeting with a Benedictine monk directed him towards the small monastery of Cogullada, in Spain, where ten monks carried out a precarious monastic life. Despite his disheveled appearance, Léonce Crenier was accepted when he knocked on their door, as the need for recruits was great."It was my chance" he later remarked, "as no other monastery wanted me ... I could only enter the Benedictine Order through a concealed door, and Cogullada was that door". The instructor of novices, Father Doreillac was a "holy old monk who had been ordained in Bordeaux". Equally sharing an enthusiasm the day's discussion quickly came to centre on the love of God and after a few minutes "we cried so much that the meeting had to end".

== From Cogullada to Abbey of Saint-Benoît-du-Lac ==
Brother Crenier quickly realised that he could not adopt the usual life of a Benedictine monk in this monastery which had been refused canonical recognition and was about to close. So he turned to the abbey of Saint Wandrille, then in exile at Conques in Belgium. He obtained a transfer there. Four years later, in 1924, he moved with the entire community in Réray, in France. Completing his philosophical and theological studies, he was ordained priest on March 3, 1928. His horticultural training led him to "cherish the hope of being put to work in the garden to help Brother Victor Brother there". But the Abbot had other plans for him. At the end of the summer, he asked Crenier to accompany Father Lohier to Canada and to help revitalise a priory which was proving hard to get off the ground. He arrived at the Abbey of St-Benoît-du-Lac on December 2, placed in charge of the noviates. By May 1929, he was under-Prior. Two years later he succeeded Father Lohier as Prior, a post he held until 1944.

== Precarity ==
The most serious problem facing the new priory was the impending threat of bankruptcy. This problem had haunted all the superiors since its foundation in 1912. Expenditure was greater than income receipts, with the deficit made up with loans. Over the years the debt had considerably increased, particularly under Dom Lohier, and had reached the sum of $29,500. Father Crenier, then sub-prior, did what he could to stop any expenditure which he considered unnecessary: e.g. he blocked the purchase of an expensive car for $800. He saw it as his duty to alert the abbot and provided a very gloomy description of the state of affairs: "Our financial standing is exceedingly serious, not to say desperate. If there is not stroke of luck, we are lost. Bankruptcy is but a few weeks off, perhaps... In eight month, our debt will have increased by $4 000." (May 24, 1931)

When he became prior, he had to effect this "stroke of luck", charged by the abbot with clearing the debt. By no means a specialist in administration, Dom Crenier had gained some experience from his time with Crédit Franco-Portugais and the Burnay Bank in Portugal. The first remedy had been to increase the income generated by the work of the monks, but in practice this failed. The farm, where so many of the monks worked, "does not bring back absolutely any money for us, but it provides us milk, butter and meat". The pastoral ministry preaching in the local parish was profitable but few ordained monks could do it as their absence was completely prejudicial to the liturgical and Community life. The only other alternative was to turn to the outside and to request the generosity of the laymen despite the unfavourable economic situation following the financial crash of 1929. However, Father Crenier reasoned that no one would be interested in giving money to pay off old debts, but rather adopted an audacious policy of saying they would start a building programme to which people could contribute, as with the basilica of Sainte-Anne de Beaupré. The abbot was not convinced by this strategy: to contemplate new constructions when one is overwhelmed by debt would be a serious imprudence. The project was abandoned. However some faithful friends in Montreal, became aware of the situation. An uncle of the Brother Roméo Thibodeau, Mr Jean Daoust, "one of two or three principal members of the Company of the Craftsmen of Quebec", obtained from this Company a loan of $11,000 at favourable terms. Working with Mr. Beaudry Leman, he also formed a committee, recruited mainly among the "Craftsmen", who committed themselves to "pay our interests during the first few years". However a Mr Mathys also intervened with a generous but unacceptable offer: he promised to pay all the debts of the monastery provided that he was incorporated the Belgian congregation. The Prior, generally supportive of Brother Mathys, made an outright refusal.

== Embracing austerity ==
The community functioned in these difficult times with the most strict economy. The Prior suggested: "we seek to save on everything", he wrote, "except on food, as we simply eat what remains". Outside purchases were reduced; the bread was henceforth baked in the monastery. The orchard and the kitchen garden provided fruit and vegetables and, during autumn, everyone helped in jam making. "We already have 700 - 800 boxes of tomatoes". These efforts and sacrifices were not in vain. The situation slowly improved as the ruinous practice loans was brought to an end. However, on April 21, 1934, Father Crenier wrote "that does not me from being blocked and even frustrated from time to time.. The Lord punishes me for my iniquities, while sending me what I need at the critical moment, but no more. I find that good. Poverty obliges me to hang with God, so to speak. I certainly would not ask for as much I do, if we were comfortable." His firmness in the exercise of his authority was combined with a paternalistic kindness, sensitive to the needs for each one of his monks. But it was that everyone should reach a healthy level of austerity. Amongst his immediate entourage, there were those who would allow the use of tobacco in order to gain recruits, "Me, never... I hold good on this point ". The rocking chair, another Canadian passion was also prohibited... "Life passes by as one sits there smoking and reading a breviary, etc." His decisive argument was, "the Trappists of Oka, do without all that and their recruitment is excellent". With this program of austerity, the Prior attracted trust and confidence. He succeeded where his predecessor had failed, in making a bond with the local community. He told the abbot, "there is on the whole a real desire for sanctification. And, remarkably, the tighter the discipline, the happier everyone is". Thirty years later, when he wrote his autobiography, Father Crenier told how of all the years he spent at St-Benoit-du-Lac, those of the great restrictions were happiest, adding "I noticed that real poverty, where one misses so many things, attracts singular graces amongst the monks, and in particular spiritual peace and joy."

== Prior of Saint-Benoît-du-Lac ==
Under the Priorate of Father Léonce Crenier, Saint-Benoît-du-Lac gradually developed. Many new noviates came forward in the first five years (1931 to 1935) – 49 applicants were accepted. In 1932, the facilities had to be expanded to build a further twenty cells. The financial position had been stabilized and the budget was balanced without resorting to loans. At this time the issue of the canonical status of the house resurfaced. In 1929, it had been set up as a simple priory. Nothing had changed in relation to the mother-abbey of Saint-Wandrille (France). For several years, the superiors of Saint-Benoît-du-Lac felt irked by the need to refer any important problem to an abbot and a chapter over six thousand kilometers away. The abbot of Saint-Wandrille, Dom Jean-Louis Pierdait, judged that the time had come to make the Canadian monastery autonomous, which, in canonical terms, means to make it a conventual priory.

Crenier was entrusted by the Religious of Jesus and Mary with the publication the autobiography of Dina Bélanger, Une vie dans le Christ: Marie Sainte-Cécile de Rome (Dina Bélanger), religieuse de Jésus-Marie (1897–1929); autobiographie et témoignages. 1934., which became very popular.

In the 1930s and 40s, Crenier was associated with Onésime Lacouture in advocating for emphasis on the Sermon on the Mount, a controversial topic within Catholicism at the time. Crenier claimed that the Sermon on the Mount, which he regarded as the essence of Christianity, had been forgotten to such an extent that it seemed revolutionary and heretical.

== Martinique ==
When he retired as Prior at Saint-Benoît-du-Lac, first he went to Portsmouth, Rhode Island in the United States of America. Here he opposed segregation by endeavouring to set up an integrated monastery, but circumstances forced him to move to Martinique. Here, with three companions, he founded the Sainte Marie de Montpelé monastery in 1947. He remained living there until his death on May 10, 1963. Monsignor Varin de la Brunellière, the Bishop of Martinique, remarked "Léonce Crenier was as righteous and sincere, as forthright and generous during his youth with the anarchist utopians as he was in later years in his fervour as a monk."

== Works ==
- — (29 September 1941). "English translation of "Grâce et Nature"". Bulletin de Saint Benoît. BANQ [P9/D4].
