= Gesta abbatum Fontanellensium =

Chronicle of the Abbey of Fontenelle

The Gesta abbatum Fontanellensium (Deeds of the Abbots of Fontenelle), also called the Gesta sanctorum patrum Fontanellensis coenobii (Deeds of the Holy Fathers of the Monastery of Fontenelle), is an anonymous Latin chronicle of the Abbey of Fontenelle written in phases between 823 and 867. It is the earliest monastic chronicle from western Europe.

It is organized around the lives and deeds of the abbots from the abbey's foundation by Wandregisel in 649 until the abbacy of Ansegisus in 823–833. The work itself was commissioned by Ansegisus and then revised and expanded after his death. It is the work of a single author, possibly the abbey's archivist. It can be divided into three parts. The first part covers the abbacy of Wandregisel, but his three successors—Lantbert, Ansbert and Hildebert—are missing. This gap corresponds to 668–701. The second part goes down to 806, but then the abbacies of Trasarus (806–17) and Einhard (818–23) are missing. The third part covers the abbacy of Ansegisus. A fourth part, an addendum to the main chronicle, contains summary notices of the deaths of Ansegisus' three successors and was written between 850 and 867.

== Editions ==
- S. Loewenfeld. Gesta abbatum Fontanellensium. Monumenta Germaniae Historica, Scriptores rerum Germanicarum in usum scholarum. Hanover: Hahn, 1886.
- F. Lohier and J. Laporte. Gesta sanctorum patrum Fontanellensis coenobii. Rouen and Paris: 1931.
