= 1796 in sports =

1796 in sports describes the year's events in world sport.

== Boxing ==
Events

- "Gentleman" John Jackson announced his retirement to leave the Championship of England a vacant title.
- 14 November — Tom Owen, said to be the inventor of the dumbbell, claimed the Championship of England after a 40th round victory over William Hooper at Harrow. Owen held the title until August 1797.

== Cricket ==
Events

- Inter-county matches were played for the last time until 1825, a victim of the loss of investment suffered by English cricket as the Napoleonic Wars escalated.

England

- Most runs – John Tufton 306
- Most wickets – Lord Frederick Beauclerk 42

== Horse racing ==
England

- The Derby – Didelot
- The Oaks – Parisot
- St Leger Stakes – Ambrosio
