= Saint Bain =

Saint Bain Bishop. Abbot
- Residence: Ancient Diocese of Thérouanne; Abbey of Saint Wandrille
- Died: 711
- Canonized: Pre-congregation
- Feast: 20 June
- Patronage: Calais, France

Saint Bain (or Bainus, Bagne, Bagnus; died c. 711 AD), a disciple of Saint Vandrille, was a bishop of Thérouanne in northwest France, and then abbot of the monastery of Saint Wandrille in Normandy. His feast day is 20 June.

== Monks of Ramsgate account ==
The Monks of Ramsgate wrote in their Book of Saints (1921),

BAIN (St.) Bp. (June 20)
(8th cent.) Bishop of Terouanne (Saint Omer). After a fruitful Episcopate he retired to the monastery of Saint Wandrille (Fontenelle) in Normandy, and later presided, in addition, over that of Fleury or St. Benoit-sur-Loire. He passed away about A.D. 711.

== Butler's account ==
The hagiographer Alban Butler (1710–1773) wrote in his Lives of the Fathers, Martyrs, and Other Principal Saints under June 20,

St. Bain, Bishop of Terouanne, (Now St. Omer), and Abbot of St. Vandrille’s. He was fifth bishop of that see, to which he was promoted before the middle of the seventh century. Merville, where St. Mauront had built his monastery of Breüil, being in the diocess of Terouanne, St. Bain translated thence the body of St. Amatus, to the church which St. Maurout had lately built at Douay. When SS. Luglius and Luglianus, two Irish hermits, had been murdered by highwaymen in this diocess, St. Bain buried them with great honour in the chapel of his castle at Lilleres, where they are honoured as patrons of the town on the 23d of October. Solitude, “which nourishes prayer as a mother does her child,” as St. John Damascen says, being always the ruling inclination of our saint, he resigned his bishopric, and retiring to the abbey of Fontenelle or St. Vandrille's, in Normandy, put on the monastic habit, as he was already possessed perfectly of the spirit, and some time after was chosen the fifth abbot of that house from St. Wandrille, in 1700 . (Note: 1700: a later edition corrects this date to 701) Out of his great devotion to the relics of the saints, he translated the bodies of St. Wandrille, Ansbert, and Wolfgran or Wulfran, out of the chapel of St. Paul, built by St. Vandrille for the burial-place, into the great church of St. Peter, in which the monks celebrated the divine mysteries. Pepin, duke of the French, having founded or considerably augmented the abbey of Fleury, now called St. Bennet's on the Loire, situated nine leagues above Orleans, he committed the same to the direction of St. Bain, in 706. The saint died about the year 711, and is honoured on the 20th of June at St. Vandrille's, and in the Gallican Martyrologies. See the Chronicle of Fontenelle, the lessons for his festival, Papebroke more exact than Mabillon, whom he corrects, T.4. Junij, p. 27.

== Migne's account ==
Jacques Paul Migne (1800–1875) in his Encyclopédie théologique: Dictionnaire de philosophie catholique wrote,

Saint Bain, bishop of Thérouanne in the 7th century, was born to an illustrious family, and was named Theodericus Buinus. He embraced the monastic life, and was one of the most fervent disciples of Saint Vandrille. He built up the monastery of Fontenelle so much by his prudence, his science and his holiness, that after the death of Saint Drancius, Successor of Saint Omer to the see of Thérouanne and Boulogne, he was elected himself and called to govern the diocese that the apostle of the Morini had organized so strongly.

Saint Bain was at the head of this church for twelve years, fulfilling all the duties of his pastoral charge with extraordinary zeal and with the greatest perfection, from the year 685 to the year 697. He made several translations, and went to Rome where Pope Sergius I showered him with precious gifts and gave him marks of his high esteem and friendship. Finally, overwhelmed by the fatigue of the pastoral ministry, and jealous of imitating so many holy bishops whose worship he had made honorable, Saint Bain resigned from his office in 697 and chose for the place of his retreat his dear abbey of Fontenelle, in which he had once spent days so full of meditation and peace.

Three years after his retirement. he had to yield to the entreaties of the monks, and accept the new office of Abbot du Fontenelle. In 705 he transferred, from the church of Saint-Paul to that of Saint-Peter, the bodies of Saint Vandrille and Saint Ansbert, which were found intact and giving out the sweetest smell. Saint Bain only lived, it seems, for a very short time after this transfer. We are unsure of the precise date of his death, which is usually placed in 706.

There remains, says Father Van-Drival, who provided us with the above details (1635), a living memory of this holy bishop in the name of the village of "Binghem", dwelling of Bain, home of Bain. We have, in fact, the tradition that Saint Bain sometimes lived in this place, where he had acquired land for the church of Thérouanne. In 846, the relics of Saint Bain were transported to Saint-Omer, in order to protect them from the desecration of the Danes. The city of Calais having been the favorite place for preaching by Bain, and this holy bishop having reaped great fruits of conversion there, the Calaisians have always considered him as their apostle, and honored him as their patron. His feast is celebrated on 10 June.

== Sources ==
- Butler, Alban (1799), The Lives of the Primitive Fathers, Martyrs, and Other Principal Saints, J. Moir This article incorporates text from this source, which is in the public domain.
- Migne, Jacques-Paul (1854), Encyclopédie théologique: Dictionnaire de philosophie catholique (in French), Chez l'éditeur This article incorporates text from this source, which is in the public domain.
- St. Augustine's Abbey, Ramsgate (1921). The Book of saints : a dictionary of servants of God canonized by the Catholic Church. London: A. & C. Black, ltd. OCLC 671676136. This article incorporates text from this source, which is in the public domain.
