= Mademoiselle Parisot =

French opera singer and ballet dancer

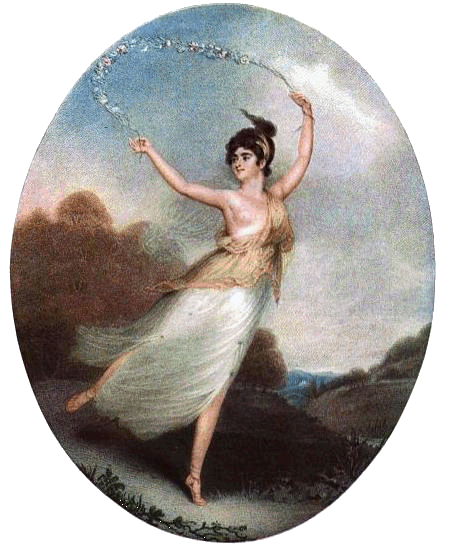
- Mademoiselle Parisot in a 1799 mezzotint by Charles Turner after John James Masquerier
- Born: c. 1775–1777
- Occupation(s): Opera, Ballet dancer
- Years active: 1789–1807

Mademoiselle Parisot (c. 1775 – after 1837) was a French opera singer and ballet dancer in the late 18th and early 19th centuries. Her provocative costumes and dances caused an uproar in London and led to the imposition of restrictions on performances.

== Background ==
Parisot's given name has been cited as Rose and as Céline, but during her career she was commonly referred to simply as "Mademoiselle" or "Madame" Parisot. She debuted at the Théâtre de Monsieur in Paris at age 14 in a 20 December 1789 production of l'Infante de Zamora. Parisot was trained by Jean-Antoine Favre Guiardele, the ballet-master of the French Opera. The Victoria & Albert Museum identifies Parisot's father as the journalist Pierre-Germain Pariseau who was mistaken for a royalist and subsequently guillotined in 1794; however, in Louis Péricaud's chronicle of the Théâtre de Monsieur, Parisot's first name was Eugénie and her father was a sculptor. Her father allegedly told her:

My daughter was raised between a linnet and a lark, but it was a nightingale which taught her to sing.

== Dancing career in England ==
After the death of her father, Parisot moved to London where she made her stage debut at the King's Theatre on 9 February 1796 in a production of Piramo e Tisbe. The Morning Chronicle spoke of the 19-year-old's performance favorably and described her balance "as positively magical, for her person was almost horizontal while turning as a pivot on her toe." Parisot frequently wore costumes that accentuated her legs as she danced, leading the Monthly Mirror to remark on her degree of flexibility in a 1796 performance in the ballet le Triomphe de l'Amour as creating "a stir by raising her legs far higher than was customary for dancers", while Leigh Hunt reported that she was "very thin and always smiling". Parisot's salary for the 1795–1796 season was £600 and she earned £577 in 1799–1800 and £840 during the 1803–1804 season.

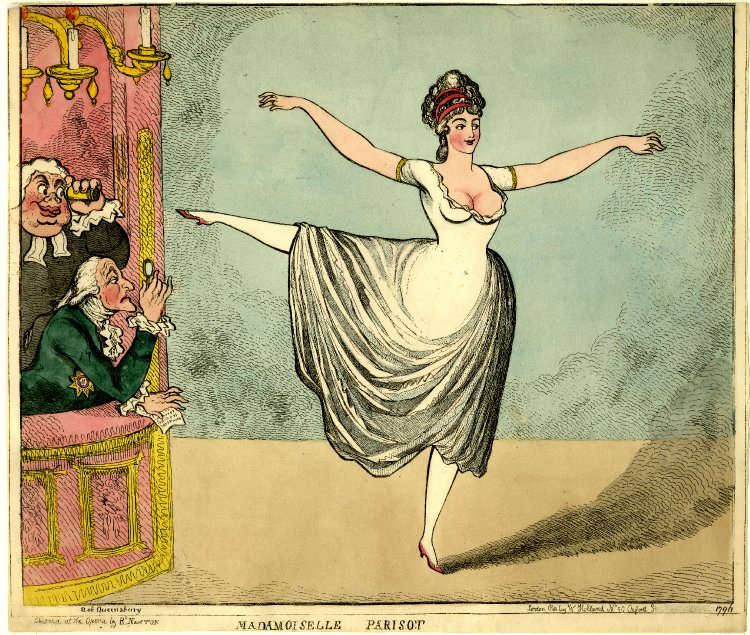
Mademoiselle Parisot in a 1796 caricature by Robert Newton. The Bishop of Durham and the Duke of Queensberry are in the theatre box to the left.

In the late 1790s, Parisot often danced with Rose and Charles Didelot, a husband and wife ballet pair that were trained in Paris and were later influential in developing Russian ballet. In 1798 The Hon. Shute Barrington, Bishop of Durham, denounced a dress she had worn while dancing at the Opera as "indecent". The risqué dance moves of Parisot and the Didelots and Parisot's use of sheer, neoclassical costumes that often exposed one breast led the same bishop to denounce the "immoral" antics of the French ballet dancers. The church's response attracted much ridicule and was parodied by many British caricaturists, including James Gilray, Isaac Cruikshank and Robert Newton, who produced multiple caricatures of the Bishop and the Duke of Queensberry looking under Parisot's skirt. In a 2 March 1798 address to the House of Lords, the Bishop declared that the French "female dancers, who, by the allurement of the most indecent attitudes and most wanton theatrical exhibitions succeeded but too effectually in loosening and corrupting the moral feelings of the people." In response to the outcry, the colour of dancer's costumes was changed from light pink, flesh-toned pieces to a less provocative white and the performances were not to extend past midnight.

In 1799, Parisot "astounded" British theatre goers when she dressed in menswear to play Lindor in a production of The Agreeable Surprise. A "shawl dance" performed by Parisot at the King's Theatre as part of the January 1805 production of the ballet, La belle Laitiere, ou Blanche, Reine de Castile "was received with enthusiastic applause." On 15 June 1805, a riot occurred at the Opera due to the manager Mr. Kelly, following the Bishop of London's orders to end the ballet by midnight, drawing the curtain before a dance by Parisot was completed. The angry theatre patrons "threw all the chairs out of the boxes into the pit tore up the benches, destroyed the chandeliers, jumped into the orchestra, smashed the piano forte and broke all the instruments of the poor unoffending performers."

== Retirement ==
Mademoiselle Parisot retired from the stage at the end of the 1807 season and married a Mr. Hughes, "an eminent florist-worker", who lived at Golden Square. An announcement in The Gentleman's Magazine for December 1807 read simply

Mr. Hughes, of Golden-square, to Madame Parisot, of the Opera-house.

At the time of her retirement, she was still playing at the King's Theatre in the ballet La belle Laitiere, and it was reported in January 1808 that she had been replaced in this by a Miss Cranfield. In March of that year Le Beau Monde reported Parisot's marriage to a Mr J. Hughes and claimed that "the lady is said to be three score years of age and to have retired from public life with three score thousand pounds". The actual sum she accrued from her performances is estimated to be around £12,000. Parisot's colleague, Michael Kelly (1762–1826), published a memoir in 1826 in which he reported that Hughes was "a man of property".

An 1827 advertisement in the Morning Chronicle listed "Madame PARISSOT de PARIS" as a business selling French perfume and flowers at No. 324 Oxford St in London.

Parisot was alive in 1837, living in Paris under her husband's name.

== Legacy ==
The 1796 Epsom Oaks winner, the Thoroughbred racehorse Parisot, was named after Mademoiselle Parisot.

In January 1799, a coloured mezzotint by Charles Turner after John James Masquerier was published which showed Parisot dancing, lightly clothed with a garland (illustration above).

== Gallery ==
Mademoiselle Parisot
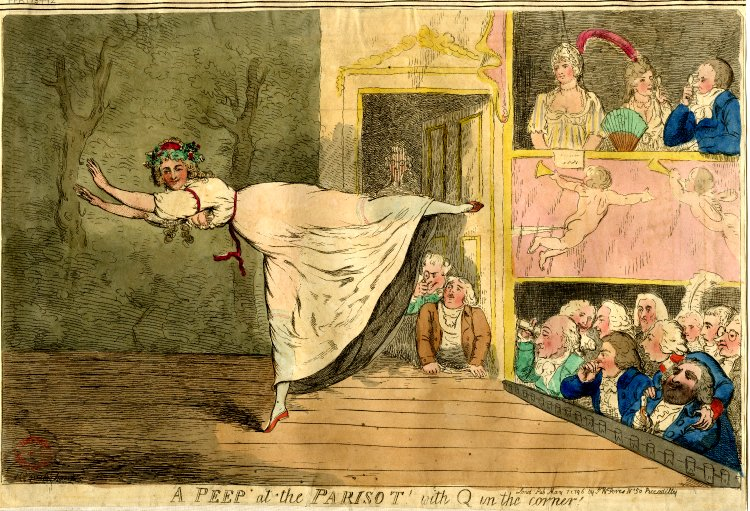
A peep at the Parisot with Q in the corner: Mademoiselle Parisot in a 1796 caricature by Isaac Cruikshank displaying her risque dancing style. The "Q" in the title is the Duke of Queensberry.

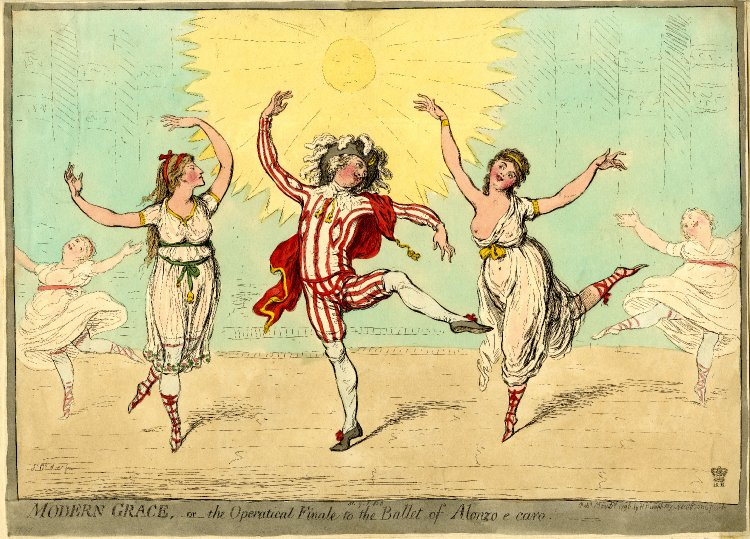
Modern Grace, -or- the operatical finale to the ballet of Alonzo e Caro: Rose Didelot, Charles Didelot and Mademoiselle Parisot in a 1796 caricature by James Gilray.
