= Weightlifting at the 1960 Summer Olympics – Men's 90 kg =

Weightlifting at the Olympics

Men's 90 kg at the Games of the XVII Olympiad
- Venue: Palazzetto dello Sport
- Date: 9 September 1960
- Competitors: 20 from 17 nations
- Winning total: 472.5 kg WR

Medalists
1st place, gold medalist(s)		Arkady Vorobyov	Soviet Union
2nd place, silver medalist(s)		Trofim Lomakin	Soviet Union
3rd place, bronze medalist(s)		Louis Martin	Great Britain

The men's 90 kg weightlifting competition at the 1960 Summer Olympics in Rome took place on 9 September at the Palazzetto dello Sport. It was the third appearance of the middle heavyweight class.

== Results ==
Rank	Name	Country	kg
1	Arkady Vorobyov	Soviet Union	472.5
2	Trofim Lomakin	Soviet Union	457.5
3	Louis Martin	Great Britain	445.0
4	John Pulskamp	United States	432.5
5	François Vincent	France	422.5
6	Vladimir Savov	Bulgaria	412.5
7	Czesław Białas	Poland	410.0
8	Leonardo Masu	Italy	407.5
9	Zdeněk Srstka	Czechoslovakia	405.0
10	Hwang Ho-dong	South Korea	400.0
11	Andrea Borgnis	Italy	400.0
12	Wolfgang Müller	United Team of Germany	395.0
13	Ramiro Fermin	Netherlands Antilles	395.0
14	José Flores	Netherlands Antilles	392.5
15	Bruno Barabani	Brazil	390.0
16	Arne Lanes	Norway	390.0
17	Kurt Herbst	Austria	377.5
AC	Lazăr Baroga	Romania	250.0
AC	Manny Santos	Australia	132.5
AC	Philome Laguerre	Haiti	137.5
