= Clancier =

Clancier is a French surname. Notable people with the surname include:

- Agnès Clancier (born 1963), French writer
- Georges-Emmanuel Clancier (1914–2018), French poet, novelist, and journalist
