= Masu =

Masu can refer to:

== Places ==
- Masu, Iran, a village in West Azerbaijan Province, Iran
- Masu, Nigeria, a town in Sokoto State, Nigeria
- Masu Bhurgri, union council in the Sindh province of Pakistan
- The other name of Wanli District, a district in New Taipei, Taiwan

== Surname ==
- Leonardo Masu (born 1934), Italian Olympics weightlifter
- Nozomi Masu (born 1980), Japanese voice actress
- Takeshi Masu (born 1955), Japanese actor

== Abbreviations ==
- MASU, Medical Assessment Unit in a hospital
- MaSu, an occasional abbreviation of the musical group Machinae Supremacy

== Other ==
- Masu (measurement), a traditional wooden or origami box
- Masu, a plant, Hedysarum alpinum, whose edible root is consumed by the Inuit of Alaska
- Masu salmon or cherry salmon, a species of salmon or trout of the North-West Pacific region
