= Wolfgang Müller =

Wolfgang Müller may refer to:

- Wolfgang Müller (actor born 1922) (1922–1960), German actor and comedian (The Spessart Inn)
- Wolfgang Müller (actor) (born 1953), German television actor
- Wolfgang Müller (sprinter) (born 1943), German Olympic sprinter
- Wolfgang Müller (artist) (born 1957), German artist, musician and writer
- Wolfgang Müller (equestrian) (1931–2021), German Olympic equestrian
- Wolfgang Müller (field hockey) (born 1938), German Olympic hockey player
- Wolfgang Müller (skier) (born 1955), German Olympic skier
- Wolfgang Müller (weightlifter) (born 1936), German Olympic weightlifter
- Wolfgang Philipp Müller, founder of VDM Publishing

== See also ==
- Wolfgang Müller von Königswinter (1816–1873), German novelist and poet
