= Jean-Louis Pierdait =

French priest

Father Jean-Louis Pierdait (Châtillon-en-Bazois, 27 January 1857 – Fontenelle Abbey, 24 December 1942) was a French priest. He succeeded Father Joseph Pothier as abbot of Saint-Wandrille.
