= Arne Lanes =

Norwegian weightlifter

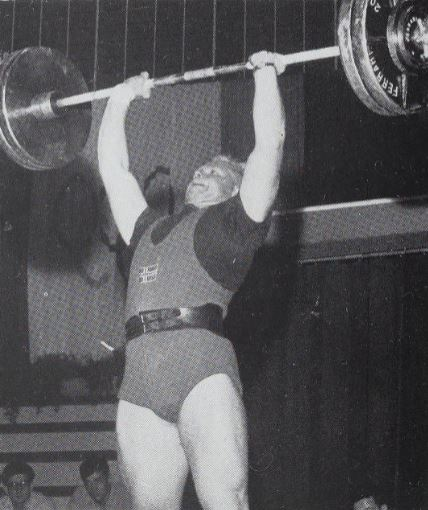
- Lanes, circa 1960

Personal information
- Nationality: Norwegian
- Born: 29 March 1938 (age 88) Stokke, Norway

Sport
- Sport: Weightlifting

Arne Lanes (born 29 March 1938) is a Norwegian weightlifter. He competed in the men's middle heavyweight event at the 1960 Summer Olympics.
