= Saint Aimé =

Abbot Bishop
- Died: September 13, 690; Bruel on the Lys, France
- Venerated in: Roman Catholic Church
- Canonized: pre-congregation
- Feast: September 13

Saint Amatus, also called St. Aimé or Aimé of Sion, (died September 13, 690) was a Benedictine monk who was chosen bishop of Sion in the Valais. He was subsequently banished by Theuderic III, King of the Franks.

== Life ==
Born of a wealthy family, took the monastic habit at the Abbey of St. Maurice, Agaunum, where, with the leave of the abbot, he dwelt in a little cell cut in a rock, with an oratory adjoining, which is now called our Lady's in the rock.

About the year 669, after serving as abbot Aimé was chosen bishop of Sion, in the Valais. He was an accomplished pastor. Here, he was able to distribute alms more generously to people experiencing poverty. He carried out this pastoral ministry with great care, watching diligently over his people, and in particular the poorest and least educated.

He had governed his diocese for almost five years when certain calumnies were spread about him. It was said that he had spoken negatively concerning the Mayor of the Palace, Ebroin. Although no synod had been assembled to hear him, no sentence of deposition issued out, nor had he been charged with any crime, King Theuderic III banished him to Saint Fursey's monastery at Péronne, where Ultan, the abbot, received him with all respect. Relieved of the responsibility of managing a diocese, Bishop Aimé found tranquility in exile.

After the death of Ultan, Abbot Mauront was charged with the custody of the bishop, and took him first to the monastery of Hamaye; but soon after built a new abbey upon an estate of his own, at a place called Breüil near Merville. Aimé removed with him to Breüil. Mauront welcomed him as a guest and entrusted him with the government of that abbey. Aimé, having settled the house in excellent order, shut himself up in a little cell near the church. Thus, he lived five years with these monks and died September 13, 690. Some time before he died in 691, Theuderic came to regret his treatment of Aimé and, in satisfaction, made several donations to the abbey of Breüil.

Around 700 Saint Bain translated the body of St. Amatus from Merville to the church which St. Maurout had built at Douay.

== Veneration ==
Saint Aimé is commemorated on September 13. He and Saint Mauront are the patron saints of the parish of St-Maurand St-Amé, in Douai.

== Other uses ==
=== Places, presumably named after the Saint ===
- Saint-Aimé, the colonial name of Djidioua (Algeria) in French
- Saint-Aimé, Quebec
- Saint-Aimé Street, Trois-Rivières

== See also ==
- Saint Amatus, of Grenoble, a Benedictine abbot and hermit who is also called Saint Amatus and has the same memorial day.
- Saint-Amé, a commune in the Vosges department in Lorraine in northeastern France.
