= John James Masquerier =

British painter

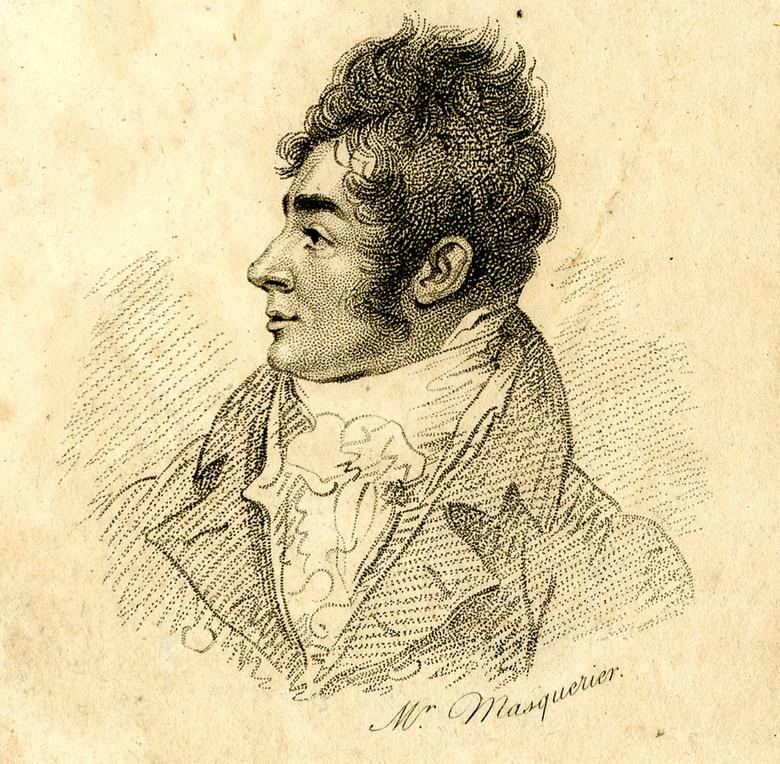
Masquerier in 1806

John James Masquerier (5 October 1778 – 13 March 1855) was a British painter of French Huguenot descent. His work was mainly portrait painting, including of notables such as Lady Hamilton.

== Life ==
He was born at Chelsea, London in October 1778. Both his parents were from French refugee Protestant families, his mother's maiden name being Barbot.

As a child he was taken to Paris by his mother, who had set up a school in the Champs-Elysées He studied painting under François Vincent at the Tuileries, and was there at the time of the murder of the Swiss Guards on 10 August 1792, but escaped with his life. Masquerier made sketches from personal observation of many events of the French Revolution, such as the murder of the Princesse de Lamballe and the trial of the king. In 1793, when the arrest was imminent of all English residents in France, he and his mother tried to leave Paris. His mother was, however, arrested and imprisoned with Helen Maria Williams and others. She owed her life and liberty to the fall of Robespierre and the events of the 10 Thermidor.

Masquerier returned to London, where he enrolled at the Royal Academy Schools on 31 December 1792. A self-portrait, painted at the age of 14, (later in the collection of Baroness Burdett Coutts), was shown to George III. In 1793 he visited the Isle of Wight, where he was the guest of John Wilkes. In 1795 he began his professional career as an artist, and in 1796 exhibited for the first time at the Royal Academy, showing a portrait and The Incredulity of St. Thomas; the latter forming the altar-piece of the chapel (once the hall of the house of Lord Chief Justice George Jeffreys) in Duke Street, Westminster.

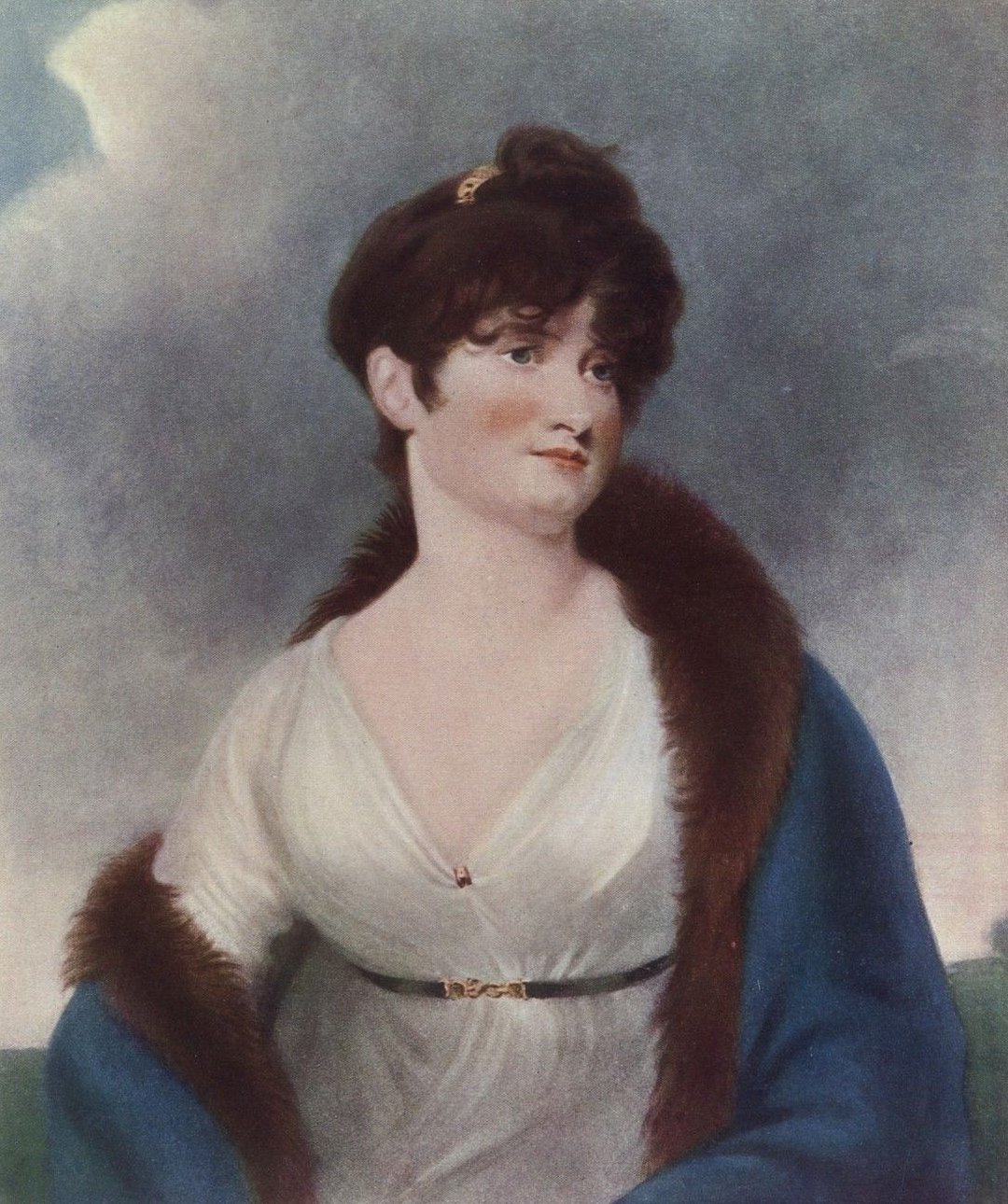
Rosemond Wilkinson (a.k.a. Mrs Rosemond Mountain) actress. An engraving after Masquerier

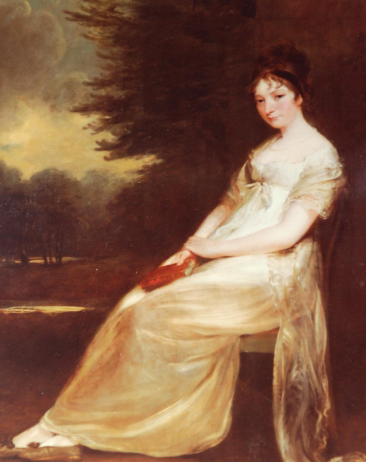
An 1807 painting of Frances Mary Richardson Currer

In 1800 Masquerier revisited Paris, and claimed, through the interest of Madame Tallien, whose portrait he painted, to have made a drawing of Napoleon Bonaparte as first consul. He certainly returned to England with sketches and notes, and with the help of Charles Turner and Henry Bernard Chalon very hurriedly painted in his London studio a picture of Napoleon reviewing the Consular Guards in the Court of the Tuileries, which he exhibited in Piccadilly in 1801. This picture attracted large crowds on the assumption that it was the first authentic likeness of Napoleon exhibited in England. The writer "Peter Porcupine" (an alias of William Cobbett, then a fierce critic of the French Revolution) accused him of being an alien spy and emissary of Napoleon. As a result, he was summoned to the Alien Office by John Reeves, and only saved himself from deportation by the producing the registration of his birth at Chelsea.

Masquerier painted more than 400 portraits in the first 28 years of his professional career. He also showed a few subject pictures at the Royal Academy, such as The Fortune Teller (1800), Petrarch and Laura (1803), and January and May (1808). In 1814 he fetched his mother from Paris, and provided for her maintenance in England. It was probably on this journey that he painted a portrait of Emma, Lady Hamilton. The next year he visited the field of Waterloo and made a painting of La Belle Alliance. He also drew a portrait of Napoleon's guide, J.B. Coster.

The early part of his career as a portraitist was much helped by the patronage of a Mr. Alexander, Chairman of Ways and Means in the House of Commons, and Major Scott Waring, a zealous supporter of Warren Hastings at his trial. Masquerier's portrait of Hastings is now in the collection of the Art Gallery of New South Wales. At a rather later period he enjoyed the friendship of Sir Francis Burdett, and of his youngest daughter Angela, later Baroness Burdett Coutts. Other notable subjects he painted included Frances Mary Richardson Currer, Harriet Mellon and Miss O'Neil, besides many of his personal friends and relations. He also painted more than one self-portrait.

In 1823 Masquerier retired from his profession, having amassed a comfortable fortune, and settled at Brighton, where he spent the rest of his life. He revisited Paris in 1850, and in 1851 toured Germany with Henry Crabb Robinson. He continued to paint occasionally; in 1831 he exhibited A Marriage in the Church of St. Germain l'Auxerrois, Paris, and in 1838 Buonaparte and Marie Louise viewing the Tomb of Charles the Bold at Bruges. He died at Brighton on 13 March 1855. His remaining pictures, sketchbooks, etc. were inherited by his relative, D. E. Forbes, and were sold by Christie's on 19 January 1878. A number of his sketchbooks were in the possession of his friend, Baroness Burdett Coutts.

His obituarist in the Gentleman's Magazine felt that, despite his professional success, which had been greatly aided by his charm and sociable nature, "his afterlife as an artist did not fulfil the promise of his youth."

== Family ==
In 1812 he married Rachel, widow of Dr. Robert Eden Scott, professor of moral philosophy at Aberdeen, daughter of Duncan Forbes, of Thainstone; she died in 1850, leaving no children.
