= Gervold =

Saint Gervold (or Girowald, or Gerwald, or Gerbaud) is a monk, diplomat of Charlemagne, bishop of Evreux around 785, and abbot of Saint Wandrille from 787. He died in 806 or 807.

He was the uncle of Saint Ansegisus whom he tonsured and clerked around 795. Gervold then took him to the court of Charlemagne at Aix-la-Chapelle where he supervised the royal works.

== Biography ==
Gervold is said to have come from a noble family, from Walgaire and Walda, and he had a beautiful voice and knew the art of singing.

Gervold was charged with various diplomatic missions by Charlemagne, particularly with the Breton chief Anowarith who held the Cotentin and the Angia Island (currently Jersey ), but also with Offa, King of Mercia, to try to negotiate the marriage of their children.

He was also in charge of collecting customs duties in the ports and markets between Rouen and Quentovic.

At the request of his mother, Charlemagne appointed him Bishop of Evreux in 785. He left the bishopric shortly after to become a monk again at the Abbaye de Saint-Wandrille de Fontenelle.

When Witlaic died on September 22, 787, he succeeded him at the head of the abbey. He established a school in the monastery of Fontenelle which was famous. He enriched the library and developed cantilena, arithmetic and the art of copyists. It was during his abbacy that the monk Hardouin († 811), recluse in the hermitage of Saint-Saturnin, copied the manuscripts brought back from Rome, wrote the life of Saint Vulfran, and taught calligraphy and arithmetic to young children.

On the other hand, he had rebuild the infirmary, the kitchens, the heater and several other parts of the abbey. His nephew Anségise de Fontenelle continued his work.

He was venerated in Fontenelle on July 1.
