= Ramiro Fermin =

Dutch Antillean weightlifter

Personal information
- Nationality: Dutch Antillean
- Born: 20 March 1940 (age 85); Curaçao

Sport
- Sport: Weightlifting

Ramiro Fermin (born 20 March 1940) is a Dutch Antillean weightlifter. He competed in the men's middle heavyweight event at the 1960 Summer Olympics.
