= John Pulskamp (weightlifter) =

American weightlifter

Personal information
- Born: June 24, 1935 (age 91) Cleveland, Ohio, United States

Sport
- Sport: Weightlifting

John Pulskamp (born June 24, 1935) is an American weightlifter. He competed in the men's middle heavyweight event at the 1960 Summer Olympics.
