= Abbey of Saint Wandrille =

Abbey in Seine-Maritime, France

Coordinates: 49°31′46″N 0°46′00″E

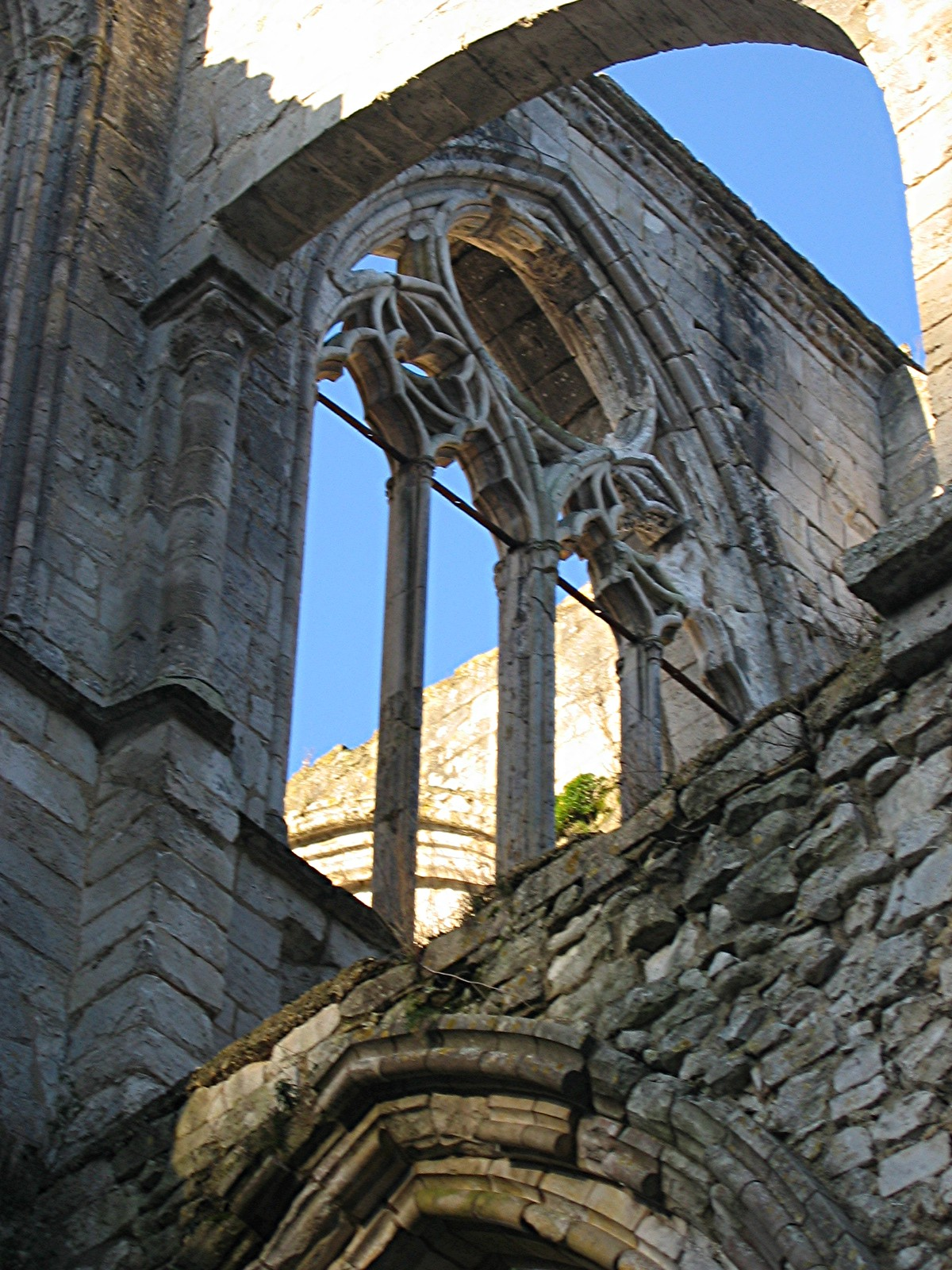
Abbey of St Wandrille

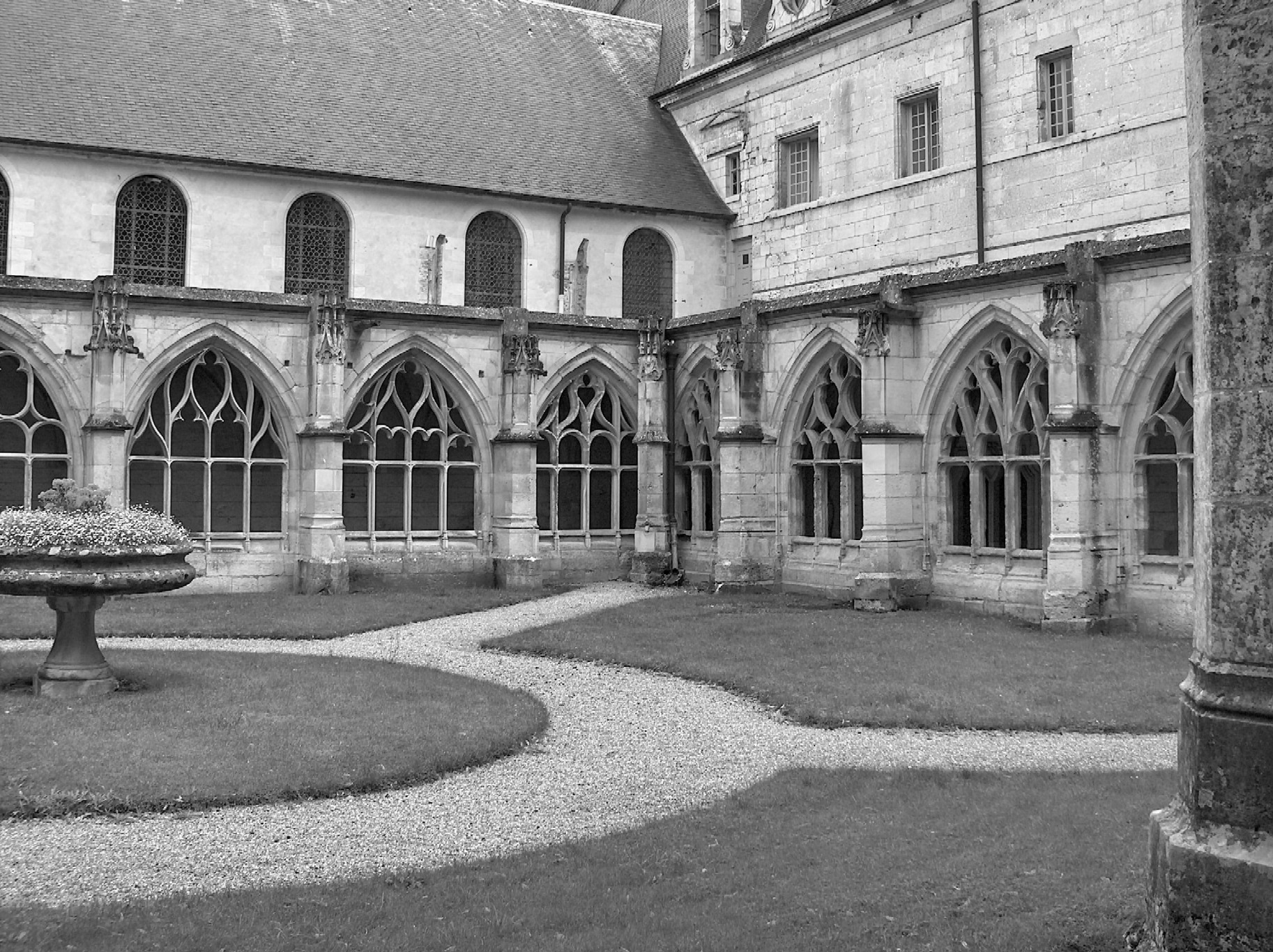
Cloisters and courtyard, Abbey of St Wandrille—Fontenelle Abbey

Fontenelle Abbey or the Abbey of St. Wandrille is a Benedictine monastery in the commune of Rives-en-Seine. It was founded in 649 near Caudebec-en-Caux in Seine-Maritime, Normandy, France.

== First foundation ==
It was founded by Wandregisel (d. 22 July 668, Wandrille in French) and his nephew Godo, on land obtained through the influence of Wandregisel's friend Ouen, Archbishop of Rouen. Wandrille, being of the royal family of Austrasia, held a high position in the court of his kinsman Dagobert I, but wishing to devote his life to God, he retired to the abbey of Montfaucon-d'Argonne, in Champagne, in 629. Later he went to Bobbio Abbey and then to Romainmôtier Abbey, where he remained for ten years. In 648 he returned to Normandy and established the monastery of Fontenelle, using the Rule of Saint Columbanus, which he had known at Bobbio; the deed of gift of the land is dated 1 March 649. It was one of the first Benedictine abbeys in Normandy and part of a powerful network of Carolingian monasteries spread across Normandy.

Wandregisel first built a Carolingian-style basilica dedicated to Saint Peter, nearly 300 feet (91 m) long, which was consecrated by Saint Ouen in 657. (This church was destroyed by fire in 756 and rebuilt by Abbot Ansegisus (823–833), who added a narthex and tower).

The monastery acquired extensive property and was extremely successful at first. In 740 however there began a series of lay abbots, under whom the monastery declined. In 823 Ansegisus, nephew of Abbot Gervold, was appointed abbot of Fontenelle, which he reformed according to the practice at Luxeuil Abbey. In 833, thieves breached the wall of the abbey and stole a gold reliquary containing a fragment of the True Cross, which Abbot Ansegisus had previously placed on the saint's tomb.

The abbey soon became a target for Viking raids, culminating in that of 9 January 852 when it was burnt down and the monks fled with the relics of Wandrille. After more than a century in temporary accommodation at Boulogne, Saint-Omer, Chartres and Ghent, the community was at length brought back to Fontenelle by Abbot Maynard in 966 and a restoration of the buildings was again undertaken. Richard I of Normandy then sent Maynard to establish the Benedictine Rule at Mont-Saint-Michel Abbey.

A new church was built by Abbot Gérard, but was hardly finished when it was destroyed by lightning in 1012. Undaunted by this disaster the monks once more set to work and another church was consecrated in 1033. Two centuries later, in 1250, this was burnt to the ground, but Abbot Pierre Mauviel at once began a new one. The work was hampered by lack of funds and it was not until 1331 that the building was finished.

=== Monks and arts ===
Meanwhile, the monastery attained a position of great importance and celebrity for the fervour and learning of its monks, who during the periods of its greatest prosperity numbered over 300. It was especially noted for its library and school, where letters, the fine arts, the sciences, and above all calligraphy, were cultivated.

One of the most notable of its early copyists was Harduin (Haduin), a mathematician (died 811) who wrote with his own hand four copies of the Gospels, one of Paul the Apostle's Epistles, a psalter, three sacramentaries, and many other volumes of homilies and lives of the saints, besides numerous mathematical works. The Capitularia regum Francorum, a collection of royal capitularies, was compiled under Abbot Ansegisus in the 9th century, who also commissioned a chronicle of the abbey, the Gesta abbatum Fontanellensium.

The monks of Fontenelle enjoyed many rights and privileges, among which were exemption from all river-tolls on the Seine, and the right to exact taxes in the town of Caudebec. The charter dated 1319 in which were enumerated their chief privileges, was confirmed by Henry V of England and Normandy in 1420, and by the Council of Basle in 1436.

Some of the burials at the abbey are

- Condedus (Conde), a 7th-century exile from England who became a monk
- Wando, Abbot, died around 756 AD
- Fulk of Fontenelle, 21st Abbot of Fontenelle
- Harduin of Fontenelle, died c. 811 AD
- Bagnus (Bagne), a monk, then Bishop of Therouanne, then Abbot of Fontenelle later in life. Died c. 710
- Girald, a monk and then the Abbot of Saint Arnoul. He was asked by the Duke of Normandy to be the Abbot of Fontenelle. He was very exacting and was later murdered by one of his monks
- Joseph Pothier, Abbot of St Wandrille Abbey and scholar who reconstituted the Gregorian chant.

=== Decline and suppression ===
Commendatory abbots were introduced at Fontenelle in the 16th century and as a result the prosperity of the abbey began to decline. In 1631 the central tower of the church suddenly fell, ruining all the adjacent parts, but without injuring the cloisters or the conventual buildings.

It was just at this time that the newly formed Congregation of Saint Maur was reviving the monasticism of France, and the commendatory abbot Ferdinand de Neufville invited them to take over the abbey and do for it what he himself was unable to accomplish. They accepted the offer, and in 1636 began major building works. Not only did they restore the damaged portion of the church, but they added new wings and gateways and also built a great chapter-hall for the meetings of the general chapter of the Maurist congregation. They gave the abbey new life, which lasted for the next hundred and fifty years.

During the French Revolution in 1791 Fontenelle was suppressed, and in the following year the property was sold by auction. The church was partially demolished, but the rest of the buildings served for some time as a factory and later passed into the possession of the de Stacpoole family, to be turned to domestic uses.

== Second foundation ==
George Stanislaus, 3rd Duke de Stacpoole, who had become a priest and a domestic prelate of the pope, and who lived at Fontenelle until his death in 1896, restored the entire property to the French Benedictines (Solesmes Congregation), and a colony of monks from Ligugé Abbey settled there in 1893, under Joseph Pothier as superior. Pothier, a scholar who reconstituted the Gregorian chant, later was elected abbot of Saint Wandrille, becoming upon his installation on 24 July 1898 its first abbot since the French Revolution and its first regular abbot since the 16th century.

This community was expelled under the "Association Laws" by the French government in 1901, and spent years in Belgium until they were able to return on 26 January 1931, where they have remained until the present.

From 1907 until 1914, the abbey was rented by the Belgian writer Maurice Maeterlinck, who lived there during the warmer months of the year with his lover, Georgette Leblanc. During the official visit of the British royal family to France, Queen Mary visited the monastery on 12 July 1917.

== Buildings ==
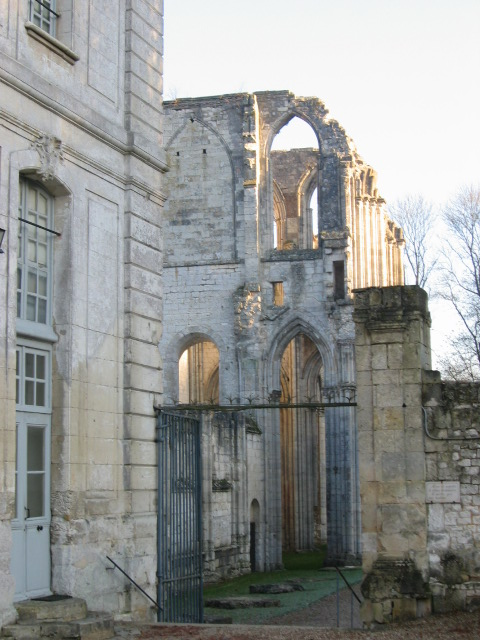
Abbey of St Wandrille—Fontenelle Abbey

Besides the chief basilica, Wandrille built seven other churches or oratories both inside and outside the monastic enclosure. All of these have either perished in the course of time, or been replaced by others of later date, except for the chapel of St Saturnin, which stands on the hillside overlooking the abbey. It is one of the most ancient ecclesiastical buildings now existing and, though restored from time to time, is still substantially the original construction of Wandrille. It is cruciform, with a central tower and eastern apse, and is a unique example of a 7th-century chapel.

In 1954, in the course of a treasure hunt, some young local scouts discovered three buried urns near a wall close to the chapel. The urns contained a total of about 500 gold coins, the latest dated 1748. The treasure was split between the abbey, as the property owner, and the parents of the boys. The abbey sold its share and used the proceeds to rebuild the outbuildings that had burned downed shortly after.

The parish church of the village of Saint-Wandrille-Rançon also dates from the saint's time, but it has been so altered and restored that little of the original structure remains.

The buildings were damaged by bombing in 1944. A new abbey church was consecrated on 12 September 1970.

== Monks ==
Fontenelle has produced an unusually large number of saints and the blessed. The calendar of the present monastery records thirty, from the founders Wandrille and Gond to Louis Lebrun, martyred in 1794 during the Revolution. All have their own feast days, but 1 March (also the date of the foundation) is the feast of all the saints of Fontenelle.

The present abbot, Jean-Charles Nault (succeeding to Pierre Massein in 2009), is the 82nd in line from Wandrille to hold the position.

== List of abbots and priors ==
=== Abbots ===
- Wandrille, 649–668
- Lambert of Lyon, 668–678, later bishop of Lyon
- Ansbert of Rouen, 678–690, bishop of Rouen
- Hildebert I, 694–701
- Bain, 701–710
- Bénigne, 710–716, and 719–724
- Wandon, 716–719, and 747–754
- Hugh of Champagne, 719–723
- Landon, 732–735
- Teutsind, abbot of Fontenelle and Saint Martin, Tours, 735–741
- Wido, lay abbot, also abbot of Saint-Vaast, 742–744
- Rainfroy, 744–748, archbishop of Rouen
- Austrulfus, 748–753
- Witlaïc, 753–787
- Gervold, previously bishop of Évreux, 787–806
- Trasaire, 806–817
- Hildebert II, 817–818
- Einhard, lay abbot, 818–823
- Ansegisus, 823–833
- Joseph I, 833–834, again in 841
- Foulques, 834–841
- Herimbert, 841–850
- Louis (abbot of Saint-Denis) (d. 9 January 867; relative and arch-chancellor of Charles the Bald), 850–867
- vacant (in manu regis), 867–886
- Ebles, 886–892
- Womar, 950–960
- Maynard, who left Saint Wandrille to become the first abbot of Mont-Saint-Michel, 960–966
- ?
- Ensulbert or Enjoubert, c. 980–993
- ?
- Gerard, 1006–1029
- Gradulphe, 1029–1048
- Robert I, 1048–1063
- Gerbert, 1063–1089
- Lanfranc, nephew of Lanfranc, archbishop of Canterbury, 1089–1091
- Gerard II (1091–1125)
- Alain (1125–1137)
- Gautier (1137–1150)
- Roger (1150–1165)
- Anfroy (1165–1178)
- Gautier II (1178–1187)
- Geoffroy I (1187–1193)
- Robert II (1193–1194)
- Reginald (1194–1207)
- Robert III de Montivilliers (1207–1219)
- Guillaume I de Bray (1219–1235)
- Guillaume de Suille, elected in 1235
- Robert IV d'Hautonne, 1235–1244
- Pierre Mauviel, 1244–1254
- Geoffroy II de Nointot, 1254–1288
- Guillaume II de Norville, 1288–1304
- Guillaume III de La Douillé, 1304–1342
- Jean I de Saint-Léger, 1342–1344
- Richard de Chantemerle, 1344–1345
- Robert V Balbet, 1345–1362
- Geoffroy III Savary, 1362–1367
- Geoffroy IV de Hotot, 1367–1389
- Jean II de Rochois, 1389–1412
- Guillaume de Hotot, elected in 1410
- Jean III de Bouquetot, bishop of Bayeux, 1412–1418
- Jean Langret, beneficiary abbot, 1418–1419
- Nicolas Lovier, beneficiary abbot, 1419
- Guillaume IV Ferrechat, 1419–1430
- Jean IV de Bourbon, 1431–1444
- Jean de Brametot, 1444–1483
- André d'Espinay, commendatory abbot, archbishop of Bordeaux, 1483–1500
- Urbain de Fiesque, papal appointee, 1483–1485
- Jean VI Mallet, elected in 1500, not confirmed
- Philip of Cleves, commendatory abbot, 1502–1505
- Jacques Hommet, last regular abbot, 1505–1523
- François Guillaume de Castelnau-Clermont-Lodève, papal appointee, rejected
- Claude de Poitiers, commendatory abbot, 1523–1546
- Michel Bayard, commendatory abbot, 1546–1565
- Gilles Duret, temporary governor, 1565–1567
- Pierre II Gourreau, commendatory abbot, 1567–1569
- Charles de Bourbon, commendatory abbot, 1569–1578
- Gilles de Vaugirault, commendatory abbot, 1578–1585
- Nicolas de Neufville, commendatory abbot, 1585–1616
- Camille de Neufville de Villeroy, commendatory abbot, 1616–1622
- Ferdinand de Neufville de Villeroy, commendatory abbot, 1622–1690
- Balthazar-Henry de Fourcy, commendatory abbot, 1690–1754
- vacancy 1754–1755
- Frédéric Jérôme de La Rochefoucauld, commendatory abbot, 1755–1757
- Louis-Sextius de Jarente de La Bruyère, commendatory abbot, 1757–1785
- Étienne-Charles de Loménie de Brienne, commendatory abbot, 1785–1790

==== Restoration of 1894 ====
After the restoration of religious life in 1894, Jean-Martial Besse and François Chamard were named superiors, after which Joseph Bourigaud, the abbot of Ligugé Abbey, was named apostolic administrator in 1895 until the nomination of an abbot in 1898.

- Joseph Pothier, sub-prior of Solesmes Abbey, then prior of Ligugé, superior (1895–1898) and abbot of Saint-Wandrille 1898–1923 (the first abbot since the abbey was suppressed in the French Revolution and the first regular abbot since Jacques Hommet in the 16th century)
- Jean-Louis Pierdait, claustral prior of Silos Abbey, coadjutor of Pothier (1920–1923), abbot 1923–1942
- Gabriel Gonthard, abbot 1943–1962
- Ignace Dalle, abbot 1962–1969
- Antoine Levasseur, abbot 1969–1996
- Pierre III Massein, abbot 1996–2009
- Jean-Charles Nault, abbot from 2009

=== Priors ===
- Genesius of Lyon, prior around 650, later almoner of Balthild of Chelles
- Guillaume Girard, prior of Jumièges Abbey, and administrator of Saint-Wandrille, 1636
- Philippe Codebret, sub-prior, 1636
- Paul de Riveri, 1636–1637
- Charles Fuscien de Lattre, 1637–1639
- Hervé Philibert Cotelle, 1639–1645
- Jacques Aicadre Picard, 1645–1651
- Guillaume Benoît Bonté, 1651–1652
- Jean Timothée Bourgeois, 1652–1656
- Jean Bernard Hamelin, 1656–1660
- Martin Bruno Valles, 1660–1663
- Jean Matthieu Jouault, 1663–1666
- Vincent Humery, 1666–1669
- René Anselme des Rousseaux, 1669–1670
- Edme du Monceau, sub-prior, 1669–1670
- Pierre Laurent Hunault, 1670–1674
- Pierre Boniface Le Tan, 1674–1675
- Claude Carrel, 1675–1678
- Marc Rivard, 1678–1684
- Pierre Noblet, 1684
- Gabriel Dudan, 1684–1687
- Guillaume Hue, 1687–1693
- Robert Deslandes, 1693
- Nicolas Sacquespée, 1693–1696
- Gabriel Pouget, 1696–1699
- Claude Hémin, 1699–1705
- Jean-Baptiste Jouault, 1705
- Jacques Joseph Le Paulmier, 1705–1711
- Pierre Chevillart, 1711–1714
- Martin Filland, 1714–1717
- Louis Clouet, 1717–1723
- François L'héritier, 1723–1729
- Jean Foulques, 1729–1733
- Louis Barbe, 1733–1739 and 1740–1745
- Pierre Eudes, 1739–1740
- Jean Lefebvre, 1745–1748
- Jacques Martin Le Sec, 1748–1752
- Jean-Baptiste Duval, 1752–1757
- François René Desmares, 1757–1761
- Nicolas Faverotte, 1761–1768
- Louis Valincourt, 1768–1769 and 1775–1778
- Noël Nicolas Bourdon, 1769–1775
- Philippe Nicolas Dupont, 1778–1781
- Jean François Daspres, 1781–1783
- Mathurin François Brissier, sub-prior, 1783
- Alexandre-Jean Ruault, 1783–1790
- Joseph Pothier, 1895

== See also ==
- List of Carolingian monasteries
- Carolingian architecture
- Carolingian art

== Sources ==
- Coupland, Simon (2014). "Holy Ground? The Plundering and Burning of Churches by Vikings and Franks in the Ninth Century". Viator. 45 (1 (Jan)): 73–97. doi:10.1484/J.VIATOR.1.103783.
- Patrick Leigh Fermor (2007). A Time to Keep Silence. New York: NYRB. ISBN 1-59017-244-2 (Originally published: London: Queen Anne Press, 1953).
