= Andrea Borgnis =

Italian weightlifter

Personal information
- Nationality: Italian
- Born: 30 March 1930; Craveggia, Italy
- Died: 15 May 1980 (aged 50)

Sport
- Sport: Weightlifting

Andrea Borgnis (30 March 1930 – 15 May 1980) was an Italian weightlifter. He competed in the men's middle heavyweight event at the 1960 Summer Olympics.
