= Ansegisus =

French monastic reformer

Saint Ansegisus
- Born: c. 770; France
- Died: 20 July 833 or 834; Fontenelle
- Venerated in: Eastern Orthodox Church; Roman Catholic Church
- Feast: 20 July

Saint Ansegisus (c. 770 – 20 July 833 or 834) was a monastic reformer of the Franks.

Born about 770, of noble parentage, at the age of eighteen he entered the monastery of Fontenelle (also called St Wandrille after the name of its founder) in the diocese of Rouen. Saint Girowald, a relative of Ansegisus, was then Abbot of Fontanelle. Upon the recommendation of the abbot Girowald he was entrusted by the Emperor Charlemagne with the government and reform of two monasteries, St. Sixtus near Reims and St. Memmius (St. Menge) in the diocese of Châlons-sur-Marne, in which he was successful.

In 817, Louis the Pious made him abbot of the famous Luxeuil Abbey, founded by Saint Columbanus as early as 590. Finally, having also reformed Luxeuil, he was transferred in 823, after the death of Einhard, as abbot to Fontenelle, where he had begun his monastic life and which he reformed as successfully as the previous monasteries. He was responsible for compiling a number of capitularies, a document of civil and ecclesiastical law, and also commissioned the first abbey history, the Gesta abbatum Fontanellensium.

== Primary sources ==
- Capitularies of Ansegisus (assembled 827), ed. G. Schmitz (1996). Die Kapitulariensammlung des Ansegis (Collectio capitularium Ansigisi). MGH Cap. NS 1. Hanover.
