= Vladimir Savov (weightlifter) =

Bulgarian weightlifter

Personal information
- Nationality: Bulgarian
- Born: 12 June 1932 (age 92); Lom, Bulgaria

Sport
- Sport: Weightlifting

Vladimir Nikolov Savov (Bulgarian: Владимир Николов Савов, born 12 June 1932) is a Bulgarian weightlifter. He competed in the men's middle heavyweight event at the 1960 Summer Olympics.
