= René Baudichon =

French sculptor and medallist

René Baudichon (24 March 1878 – 1963) was a French sculptor and medallist. The artist was born in Tours, France, studied at the École des Beaux-Arts in his native town, and graduated from the École des Beaux-Arts in Paris.

He is known for his fine art medals, which are considered a form of exonumia. These include a medal commemorating the sinking of the RMS Lusitania. He also created in 1922 an award-winning hood ornament in the form of a caricature lion for the automobile company Peugeot.

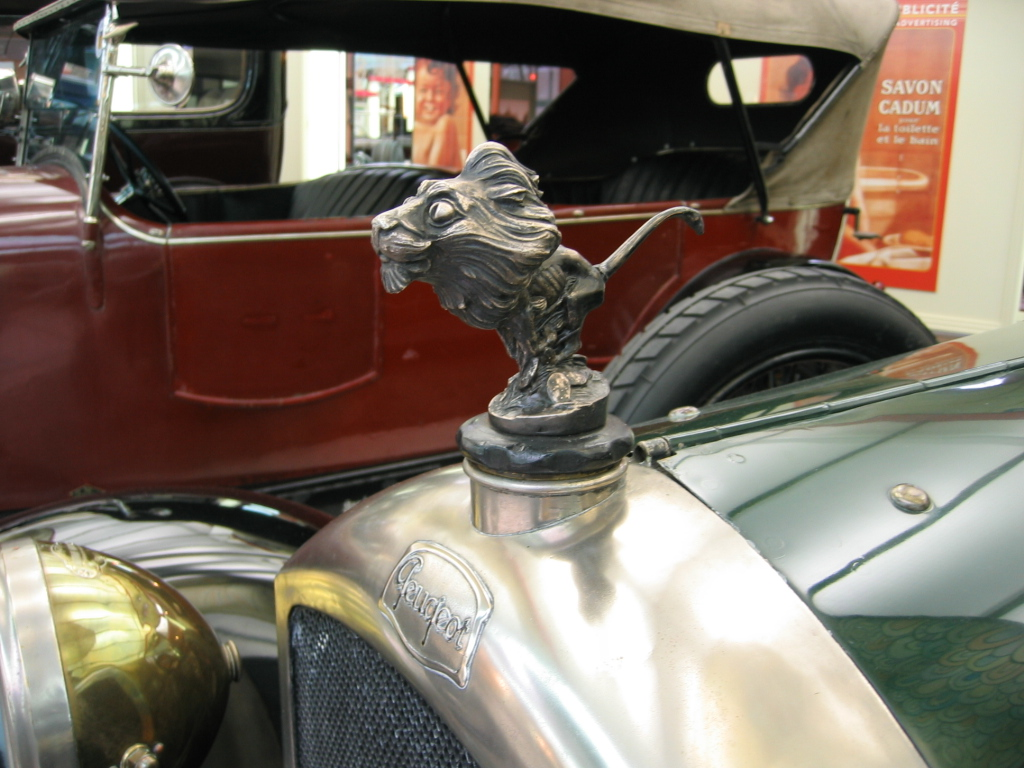
Peugeot Type 175 04
