= Jean-Yves Malmasson =

French composer and conductor (born 1963)

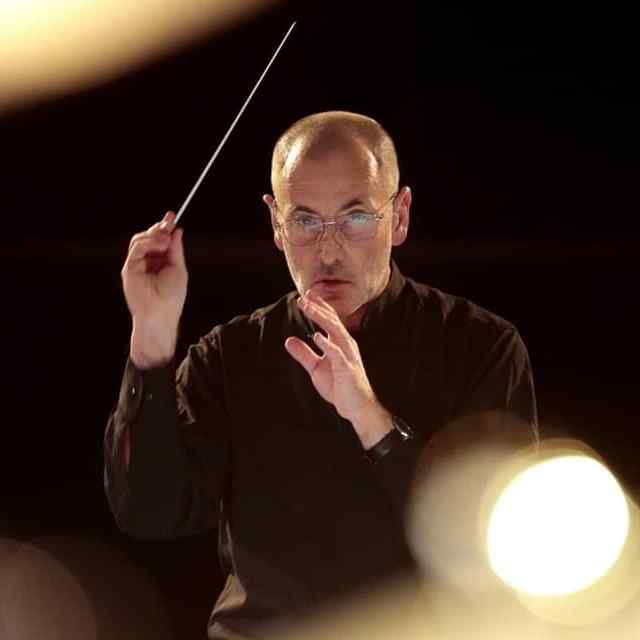
Jean-Yves Malmasson (2020)

Jean-Yves Malmasson (born 1963) is a French composer and conductor.

Malmasson was born in Saint-Cloud in the Paris suburbs. After studies in piano, ondes Martenot, and composition at the Conservatoire National de Région, Boulogne-Billancourt, he went on to study composition and conducting at the Conservatoire de Paris, where he won a first prize in composition. His orchestral tone poem "Le chant de Dahut" for ondes Martenot and Orchestra won the SACEM prize at the 1988 Festival des tombées de la nuit, in Rennes (France).

His principal teachers include Alain Louvier, Pierre Grouvel, Serge Nigg, Jacques Charpentier (musical writing technique and composition), and Jean-Claude Hartemann and Jean-Sébastien Bereau (conducting).

Malmasson's compositions are written in an expressive, extended-tonal style which uses a great deal of harmonic vocabulary borrowed from the style of Olivier Messiaen (notably in the early work "Un feu ardent dans un silence noir et froid" for pianoforte). Malmasson is often inspired by space and astronomy ("Mare Nostrum" for Orchestra, Coro).

In addition to being the musical director of the city of Puteaux wind orchestra, a post he has held since 1988, Jean-Yves Malmasson is also director of Orchestre Philharmonique Francilien (Versailles).

== Works ==
- Prelude (1978) for orchestra
- Un feu ardent dans un silence noir et froid (1980) for pianoforte
- Variations sur "b.a.c.h." (1981) for pianoforte
- Symphonie n° 1 "dsch", hommage à Dmitri Shostakovich (1981–83, rév. 2000) for orchestra
- Invocation a la lune (1983) for two ondes martenots, piano and percussion
- Trois melodies sur des poemes de Charles Baudelaire (1984) for medium voice and piano
- Trois melodies sur des poemes de Charles Baudelaire (1984, arrg. 2001) for medium voice, violoncello and piano
- Le chant de Dahut (1985) orchestral tone poen for ondes martenot and orchestra
- Trois miniatures burlesques (1988) for string quartet
- Trois miniatures burlesques (1995) for string orchestra
- Premier Quatuor a cordes (1988–91) for string quartet
- La lettre à Eloïse (1991) humoristic piece for violin, piano and triangle
- Estebaña (1991) for violin, piano and "accessoires pittoresques"
- Diptyque (1992) passacaille and scherzo on a theme by a. berg, for violoncello and piano
- Metapastiches (1992–93) for orchestra
- Concerto grosso (1992–94) for ondes martenot, keyboard percussion quartet and concert band
- Hymne aux lumieres (1994) for concert band
- Amuse-gueule (1994) for concert band
- Trois poemes de Paul Eluard (1996) for baritone and quartet(clar., cor, vl., vlc.)
- Figurines' (1996) for brass quintet.
- Mare nostrum (1996) passacaille pour orchestre.
- 3 pieces for flute and piano (teaching piece)(1997)
- 3 pieces for piano (teaching piece)(1997)
- Sonatine entomologique for flute, oboe, clarinet, bassoon and percussion (1997)
- Burlesques (1998) suite for string orchestra.
- Trois poemes de Charles Baudelaire (1999) for voice and orchestra.
- Quatre miniatures burlesques (1999) for piano 4 hands
- Symphonie n° 2, for string orchestra (2000)
- Memoire du futur, ou cantate pour la paix (2000- ) cantata for soloists, chorus and orchestra on a text by Hervé Miclos act 1 has been completed to date.
- 5 aphorismes in memoriam D. D. Chostakovitch', trio n° 1 for violin, violoncello and piano (2001)
- Les fleurs du desir (2001) chamber cantata for soprano voice with violin, violoncello and piano
- Sinfonietta (2002) for string orchestra, piano and percussion
- Sketches a quatre (2002) three easy pieces for string quartet
- Aux bien brulants astres d'or (1995–2002) Symphony n° 3 for chorus and orchestra
- Album pour Odile (2003) 3 easy pieces for clarinet and piano
- Duos pour Odile (2003) 2 easy pieces for two clarinets and piano
- Album pour Odile (2003, transcription 2005) 3 easy pieces for alto saxophone and piano
- Duos pour Odile (2003, transcription 2005) 2 easy pieces for 2 alto saxophones piano
- De soleil et de vent (2004) for ondes martenot solo
- Les exilés, trio n° 2 for violin, violoncello and piano (2004–2005), with an actor ad libitum
- Trois figurines (2005) récitatif, choral et fugue for organ
- Tonton claudio (2006) musical tale for narrator and 14 instruments, to present the instruments to children
- Croquis asymetriques (2006) a booklet of 9 violin duets
- Cantilene pour francois (2006) for solo cello
- Fantaisie sur Les brigands d'Offenbach (2007) for clarinet quartet or band
- Fantaisie sur Les brigands d'Offenbach (2007, arr. 2008) for saxophone quartet or band
- Fantaisie sur Les brigands d'Offenbach (2007, arr. 2009) for string quartet
- Mouvement symphonique (2007) for orchestra
- Frontispice (2008) for orchestra
- Points de suspension (2008) Nocturne for clarinet in B flat and cello
- Un songe d'outre monde (2009) for Native American flute in F and three tom-toms (or three congas)
- Une chanson douce (2010) for voice and piano
- Quatre soleils verts - Fourth Symphony (2011), poem for mezzo-soprano, mixed choir and orchestra
- Last post, for claude (2012) for solo flugelhorn (or B-flat trumpet)
- Quatre chansons pour Emma (2012-2015) for voice and piano
- Extra (2011-2013) Opera buffa in three acts, libretto by Laurent Bouëxière
- Les chants du séraphin (2016) for flute, violin, viola and cello
- En habit de Satie (2021) Paraphrases on Erik Satie's Deuxième Gymnopédie, for orchestra (and mixed choir ad libitum)
- Fragment de solitude (2020) for string quartet
- Extrasymphonie (2020) Symphonic Suite from the Opera buffa Extra
