= Joseph Pothier =

French prelate, liturgist and scholar

Dom Joseph Pothier, O.S.B. (7 December 1835 – 8 December 1923) was a worldwide known French prelate, liturgist and scholar who reconstituted the Gregorian chant.

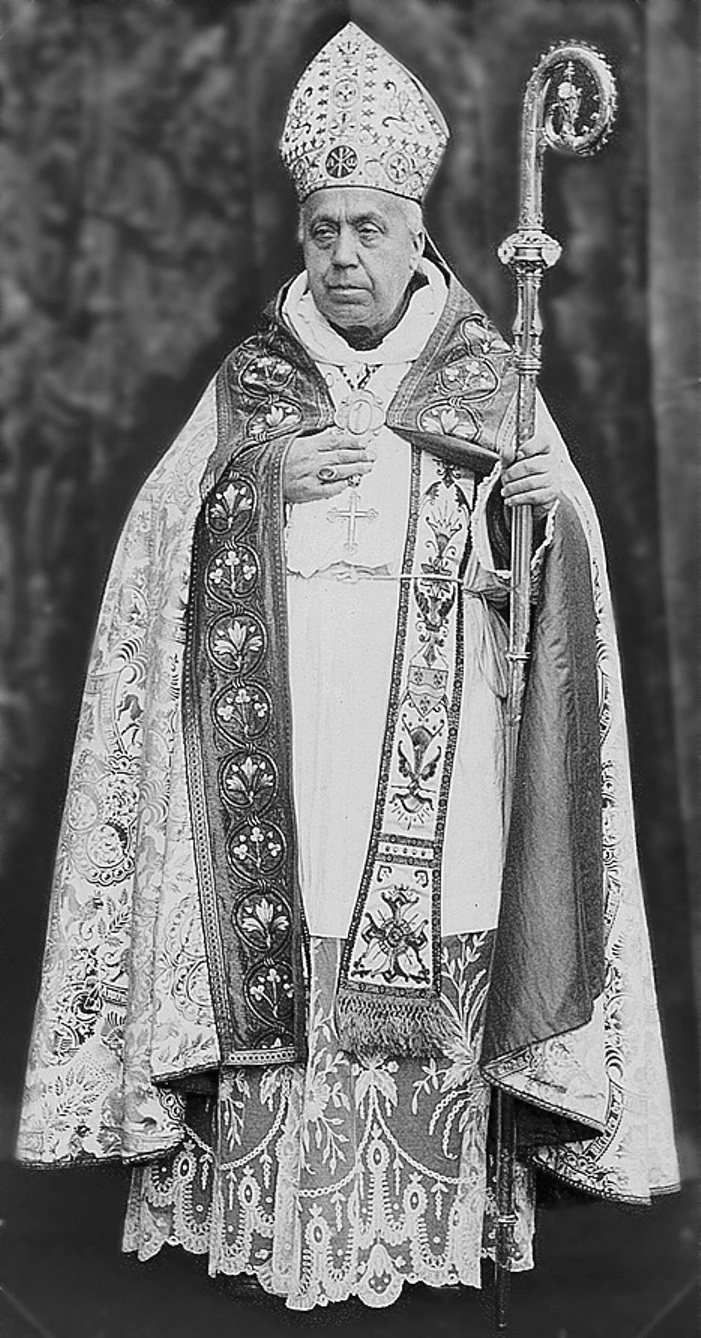
Dom Pothier (1898)

== Benedictine life ==
Born in 1835 at Bouzemont, France, Dom Joseph Pothier was ordained a priest in the diocese of Saint-Dié in 1858, before immediately joining St Peter's Abbey, Solesmes under Abbot Dom Prosper Guéranger. By founding, in the then derelict priory of Solesmes, the first new abbey of the Order of Saint Benedict in France, Dom Guéranger had re-established monastic life in the country after it had been wiped out by the French Revolution.

Pothier later was made subprior (1862-1863 and 1866-1893) of Solesmes, then claustral prior (1893-1894) of St Martin's Abbey, Ligugé, also a former deserted priory which had been resettled by Solesmes. In 1895 he became superior of the colony of monks from Ligugé sent to repopulate the monastery of St Wandrille (Fontenelle), an ancient and abandoned Benedictine abbey - also suppressed during the French Revolution - in Saint-Wandrille-Rançon, Normandy.

Pope Leo XIII having restored the abbatial title of Fontenelle specially for him, Dom Pothier was eventually raised to the dignity of Abbot of St Wandrille's Abbey (installed on 24 July 1898) - becoming the first abbot of the monastery since the French Revolution and its first regular abbot since the 16th century. Cardinal Guillaume Sourrieu, Archbishop of Rouen and Primate of Normandy, assisted by the abbots of Solesmes and Ligugé as co-consecrators, conferred the abbatial blessing upon him on 29 September 1898, in the presence of three other prelates and 150 priests.

Following the French "Association Laws" against religious congregations passed by Minister Waldeck-Rousseau, Dom Pothier moved from France to Belgium with his exiled community in 1901.

== Music ==
A musicologist, disciple and collaborator of Dom Prosper Guéranger, Dom Pothier contributed to the reconstitution, the restoration and the renewal of the Gregorian chant, a form of monophonic, unaccompanied sacred song of the Roman Catholic Church.

Besides being the composer of many Gregorian songs (Officium Defunctorum, 1887) and the writer of a huge number of articles, Dom Pothier was also the head and editor of the Revue du Chant Grégorien (1892–1914) - supervising the publication of several works (Hymnes, Christmas office, Antifonario, Cantus mariales) -, the founder of the Paléographie Musicale publication for the dissemination of medieval liturgical manuscripts, and the author of a new edition of the choir books based on manuscripts of the Gregorian chant and of several studies on the plainchant, including Les mélodies grégoriennes d'après la tradition (Gregorian Melodies According to the Tradition), 1880, his chief work which became the standard work on the subject.

Dom Pothier was appointed president of the newly created Pontifical Commission on the Vatican Edition of the Gregorian Liturgical Books by Pope Pius X in 1904. As chairman of this commission for the reconstitution of the music of the Roman Catholic Mass, Dom Pothier lived in Rome from 1904 till 1913.

His Liber Gradualis, 1883, marked the beginning of a reform in liturgical chant and was used as a basis for the Gradual Vatican which was published, under his responsibility, in 1908.

Dom Pothier died at the old priory of Conques, Belgium in 1923; the Bishop of Luxembourg and six prelates attended his funeral at Clervaux abbey, Luxembourg (his remains later were transferred to Saint-Wandrille in 1962).

The exiled community of St Wandrille's Abbey, under Dom Pothier as Abbot, founded in 1912 a new priory in Canada, Saint Benedict Abbey, Quebec, which later became independent within the Solesmes Congregation.

== Sources ==
- Dom Joseph Pothier, abbé bénédictin de Saint-Wandrille, Restaurateur du Chant grégorien, X.M.L., 1999-2009 (available at [FR]), partially based on Dom Joseph Pothier, Abbé de Saint-Wandrille, et la restauration du chant grégorien, a biography by Dom Lucien David, O.S.B. (A.S.W).
