= Charles Turner (engraver) =

English engraver and draughtsman (1774–1857)

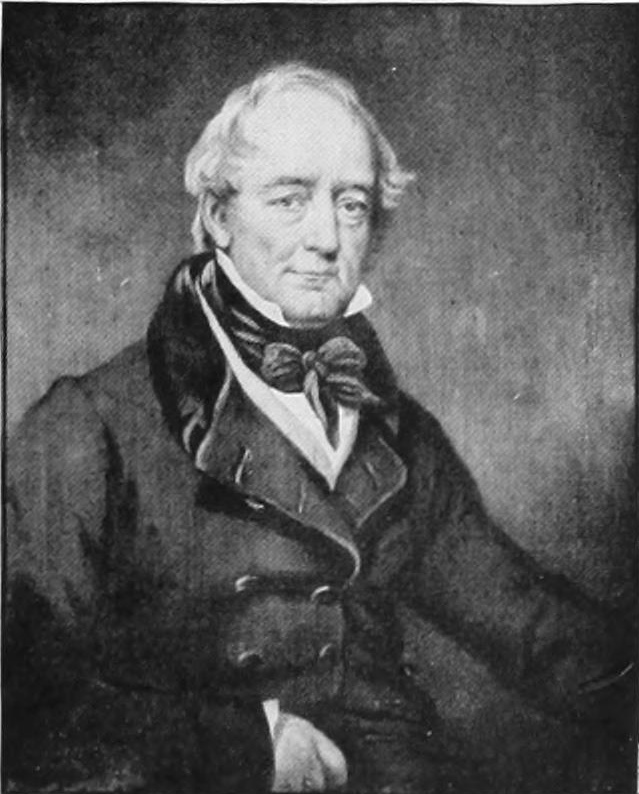
Self-portrait of Turner

Charles Turner ARA (31 August 1774 – 1 August 1857) was an English engraver and draughtsman who specialised in portraiture. He collaborated with J. M. W. Turner (to whom he was not related) on the early plates of the same's Liber Studiorum.

== Life ==
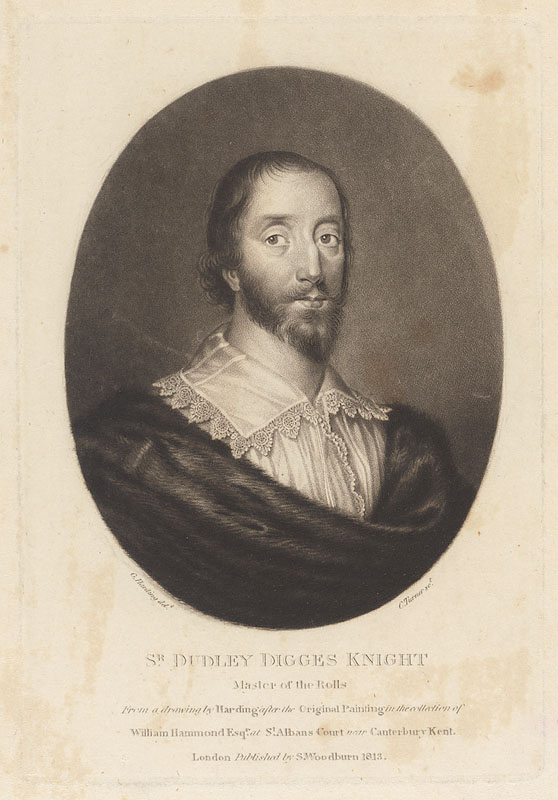
Engraving of Dudley Digges by Charles Turner

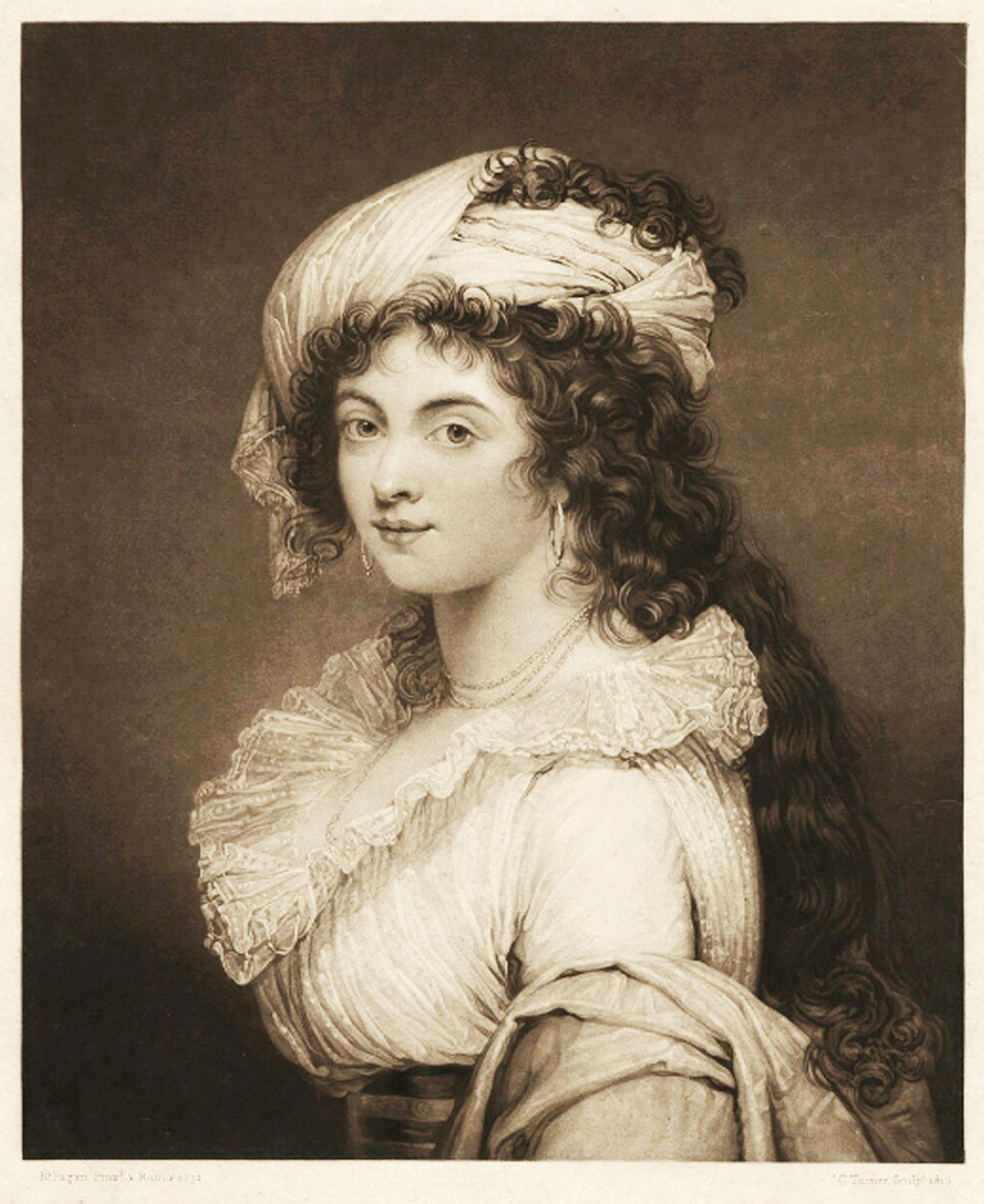
Ch. Turner after Robert Fagan. Sarah Capell-Coningsby, Countess of Essex. 1816. Mezzotint.

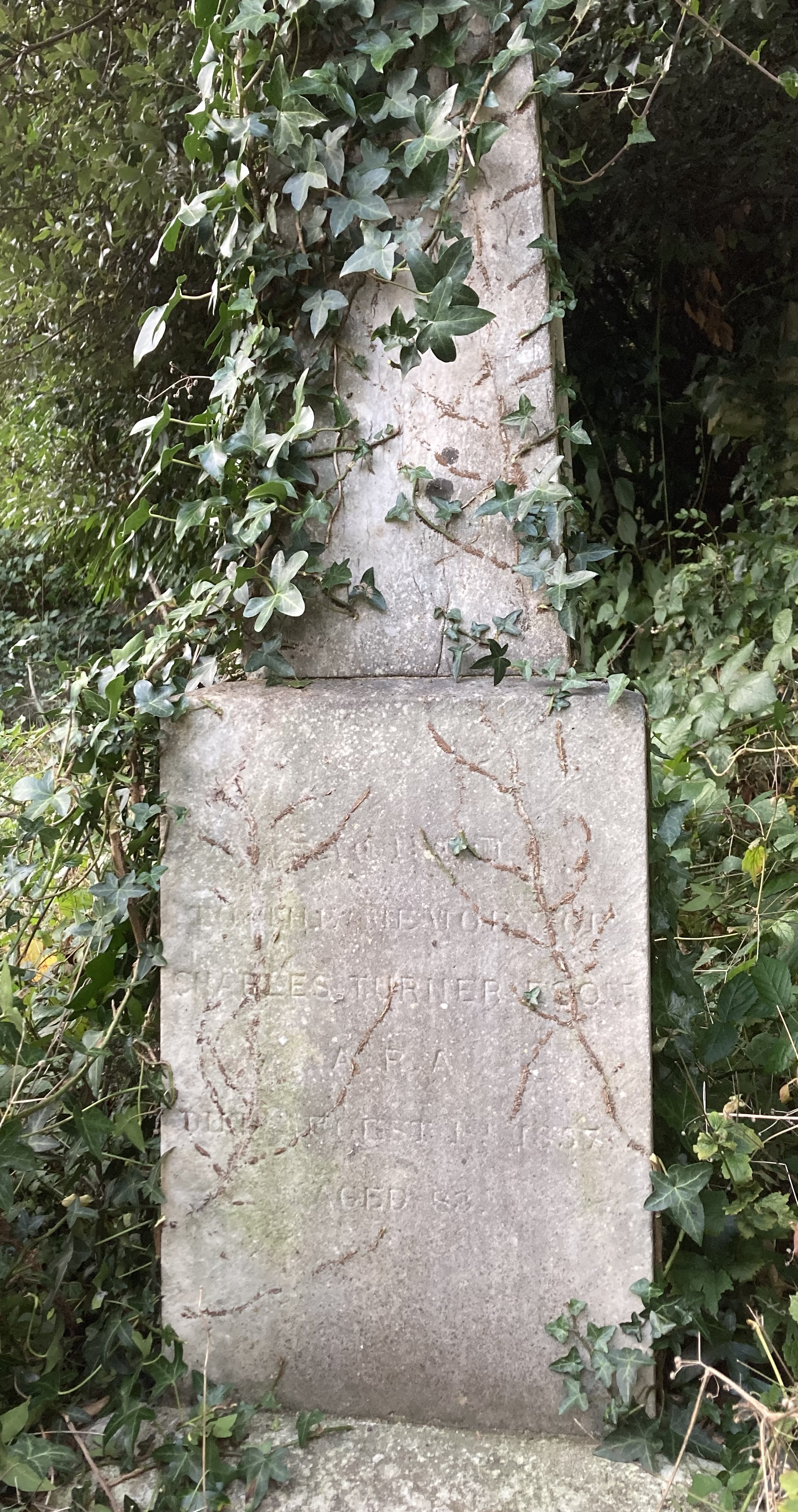
Grave of Charles Turner in Highgate Cemetery

Turner was born at Woodstock in Oxfordshire. His father, also named Charles, was an excise officer, and his mother, Jane was a former paid companion to the Duchess of Marlborough at Blenheim Palace. Following his father's death, his mother returned to the Duchess's service, with the result that Turner had access to the gallery at the palace. He moved to London in about 1789, where he worked for John Boydell, a major print publisher, and enrolled in the Royal Academy Schools.

He made his first mezzotint in 1795, working from a portrait of John Kirby, the keeper of Newgate, painted by his friend John James Masquerier, and immediately afterwards produced a stipple engraving after a portrait of Joshua Reynolds. Turner's biographer, Alfred Whitman, dismisses a tradition in the artist's family that he was apprenticed to George Jones, who was in fact younger than Turner, but suggests that he may have come under the influence of George Jones' father John Jones, who was a notable exponent both of mezzotint and stipple, without making any mention of any formal apprenticeship. In 1798 he was employed by the publisher Edward Orme to produce the first plates for his "transparencies", a new type of varnished and coloured print designed to be illuminated from behind.

In 1801 he issued, with great success, a print of Napoleon, apparently based on a portrait by Masquerier painted on a visit to Paris, and was involved in the exhibition of a gigantic painting, Bonaparte Reviewing the Consular Guards, also ostensibly by Masquerier. Turner's annotated copy of the exhibition catalogue, however, indicates that there was an element of deception to the enterprise, and that Masquerier had never in fact seen Napoleon. Turner himself had executed much of the painting.

While a student at the Royal Academy, he had become a friend of J.M.W. Turner (to whom he was not related), and in 1806 he made a mezzotint of his Shipwreck. This ambitious plate – 82 cm across. – was the first individual print to be made after one of the artist's paintings. In that year he also began work on the Liber Studiorum, working in mezzotint over outlines etched by J.M.W. Turner. After the issue of the first part he also took over as publisher. The two men worked closely on the plates, J.M.W. Turner adding new ideas to the proofs as the work progressed. Charles Turner continued to work on the project until 1809, when a quarrel over money led to the end of the arrangement: according to his own account, the two men did not speak for the next 19 years. He did however engrave and publish a plate after J.M.W. Turner's Vesuvius in Eruption in 1815, and engraved five plates for the artist's Rivers of England from 1823 onwards. The relationship seems eventually to have been mended, and Charles Turner was one of the executors of J. M. W. Turner's will.

Although predominantly working in mezzotint, Turner also produced stipple engravings, aquatints, and etchings. The mezzotints themselves were worked over an etched background. Although his work covers a wide range of genres, his main interest was portraiture; Whitman lists 637 portraits, out of a total of 921 prints. He was exceptionally prolific, his ability to produce work quickly allowing him to successfully exploit the market for images of people were currently attracting public attention.

He was appointed "Mezzotinto Engraver in Ordinary to his Majesty" in 1812 and was elected an associate of the Royal Academy in 1828. Up to that point he had only exhibited paintings and drawings at the Academy, but from then on also showed prints. From about 1836 his output declined, and he exhibited no more mezzotints after 1843.

He died at his home on, Warren Street, London, on 1 August 1857 and was buried on the western side of Highgate Cemetery.
