= François Vincent =

French weightlifter

Personal information
- Nationality: French
- Born: 10 April 1936 (age 89) Montpellier, France

Sport
- Sport: Weightlifting

François Vincent (born 10 April 1936) is a French weightlifter. He competed in the men's middle heavyweight event at the 1960 Summer Olympics.
