= Pauline Ester =

French singer

- Born: Sabrina Ocon; 18 December 1963 (age 62)
- Origin: Toulouse, Occitanie, France
- Genres: Pop music
- Occupation: Singer
- Years active: 1989–present
- Website: www.paulinester.com

Pauline Ester (born Sabrina Ocon; 18 December 1963, Toulouse, France) is a French singer.

== Biography ==
Ester's album, "Le Monde est fou", certified Gold disc, met success by the general public between 1989 and 1991 thanks to the songs "Le Monde est fou", "Il fait chaud", "Une Fenêtre ouverte", and particularly "Oui, j'l'adore", which was a hit in 1990. After a second album, De l'autre côté, Pauline Ester faded into the background before making a comeback in 2006 with a best-of containing three new songs. In 2008, her hit "Oui, j'l'adore" was used in a French TV advert for Groupama.

== Discography ==
=== Albums ===
- 1990: Le Monde est fou
- 1992: De l'autre côté
- 2006: Best Of

=== Singles ===
- 1990: "Le Monde est fou"
- 1990: "Il fait chaud"
- 1990: "Oui, j'l'adore" – #11 in France, Gold disc
- 1991: "Une Fenêtre ouverte" – #33 in France

- 1992: "Peace & Love"
