= Wolfgang Müller (weightlifter) =

German weightlifter (born 1936)

Personal information
- Nationality: German
- Born: 19 April 1936 (age 90) Dresden, Germany

Sport
- Sport: Weightlifting

Wolfgang Müller (born 19 April 1936) is a German weightlifter. He competed in the men's middle heavyweight event at the 1960 Summer Olympics.
