= Agnès Clancier =

French novelist

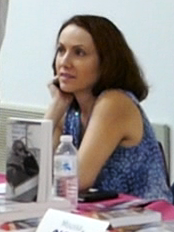
Agnès Clancier in 2017

Agnès Clancier (born 8 June 1963) is a French writer.

She was born at Bellac, Haute-Vienne, France, and has lived in Australia and Burkina Faso. She has published five novels. Her novel Port Jackson, published by Éditions Gallimard in 2007, retraces the early history of British settlement of Australia.

== Bibliography ==
- Murs, 2000, Editions Climats
- L'Ile de Corail, 2001, Editions Climats
- Le Pélerin de Manhattan, 2003, Editions Climats
- Port Jackson, 2007, Éditions Gallimard
- Karina Sokolova, 2014, Éditions Arléa
