= Parisot (horse) =

British Thoroughbred racehorse

- Sire: Sir Peter Teazle
- Grandsire: Highflyer
- Dam: Deceit
- Damsire: Tandem
- Sex: Mare
- Foaled: 1793
- Country: Kingdom of Great Britain
- Colour: Brown
- Breeder: Sir Frank Standish
- Owner: Sir Frank Standish
- Trainer: Richard Prince
- Record: 22: 2-5-7

Major wins
- Epsom Oaks (1796)

Parisot (1793 – after 1808) was a Thoroughbred racehorse that won the 1796 Epsom Oaks. Parisot was owned by Sir Frank Standish, who won the 1796 Epsom Derby with his colt Didelot.

== Background ==
Parisot was foaled in 1793 and was sired by The Derby winner Sir Peter Teazle. Her dam, Deceit (foaled in 1784), was bred by Mr Tattersall and was owned by Sir Frank Standish. Deceit produced 13 foals between 1790 and 1808, of which Parisot was her fourth, and the second of eight sired by Sir Peter Teazle. Deceit was a full-sister to the 1786 Oaks winner the Yellow Filly. Parisot's full-sister, the Sir Peter Mare (foaled in 1802), was the dam of Gramarie and the maternal grandam of Derby winner Prince Leopold.

Parisot was named after "a famous she-dancer of the day", a French dancer known as Mademoiselle Parisot.

== Racing career ==
=== 1796: three-year-old season ===
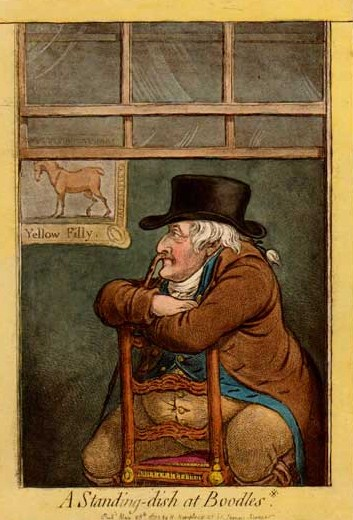
Sir Frank Standish, Parisot's breeder and owner, in a caricature by James Gillray. A portrait of the Yellow Filly, sister of Parisot's dam, is on the wall behind Standish.

Parisot (spelled "Parissot" in the 1796 Racing Calendar) won The Oaks held on Friday 13 May at Epsom Downs Racecourse, beating "Sister to Viret" and a filly sired by Pot-8-Os, having started at odds of 7/2 in a field of thirteen fillies. The betting favourite was a filly named Frisky which was disqualified for running off course. At the July Newmarket meeting, Parisot was beaten in a match race by Sir Shelley's colt Cub, and Parisot finished third in a £50 race against six other horses. At the October meeting at Newmarket, Parisot was third in the Town Plate, losing to the colts Stickler and Hyperion. Parisot ran unplaced in the first class of the Oatlands Stakes. In her final start of the season, Parisot finished third in a £50 Subscription Handicap Plate.

=== 1797: four-year-old season ===
Parisot started in the Craven Stakes held on 17 April at Newmarket but was unplaced in the race won by Hambletonian. At the same meeting, Parisot was unplaced in a £50 subscription handicap race. At Epsom on 31 May, Parisot was second to Mr Durand's horse Play in a £50 race. At Chelmsford on 18 July, Parisot was placed third and last in the Her Majesty's Plate for having "bolted" during the running.

=== 1798: five-year-old season ===
In April at the Craven meeting, Parisot was fourth in the second class of the Oatlands Stakes, was third in the King's Plate won by Mr Phillips's filly Lilly and withdrew from a 600-guinea sweepstakes race. In August at Newmarket, Parisot was second to Caroline in the 100-guinea His Majesty's Plate. At Lincoln, Parisot finished fourth in His Majesty's Plate run over four two-mile heats, finishing second in the first heat, fourth in the second heat and second in the third heat. The next day, Parisot was unplaced in a 70-guinea race run over three heats. In her final two starts of the season, Parisot finished second in a 50-guinea race and was third in a £50 race at Newmarket.

=== 1799: six-year-old season ===
Parisot started only three times in 1799, with all races occurring at the First Spring Meeting held in April at Newmarket. Parisot won an 1100-guinea sweepstakes race, beating Lord Cavendish's horse Jupiter and John Lade's horse Oatlands. The next day, she finished second in the King's Plate to Mr Garforth's mare Caroline. In her final start of the season, Parisot finished sixth in a subscription handicap race.

=== 1800: seven-year-old season ===
At the Craven meeting in April, Parisot was third in an 800-guinea sweepstakes race. Parisot finished fifth in the Jockey Club Plate in May, the race being won by the colt Expectation. At Epsom on 28 May, Parisot was third in a race run over three three-mile heats.

== Stud career ==
Parisot was retired from racing in 1801. Parisot produced four live foals, two colts and two fillies, from 1803 to 1808. She was barren in 1802 and 1806 and aborted a colt by Mr. Teazle in 1804. Her 1807 filly, Pirouette, sired by Young Eagle finished second to Oriana in the 1810 Oaks. She was one of six horses poisoned and one of four killed at Newmarket shortly before running in the Craven Stakes on 3 May 1811. Commentary in the Sporting Magazine stated that poison was "administered in their watering troughs" in an attempt to prevent the animals from running in the Stakes. The substance was later identified as arsenic and the perpetrator, Daniel Dawson, was hanged in 1812 after a high-profile trial. A full-sister to Pirouette finished second in the 1811 Oaks to Sorcery. No foals are recorded for Parisot after 1808, suggesting that she may have died or was sold for other purposes.

== Pedigree ==
Pedigree of Parisot (GB), Brown filly, 1793
| Sire Sir Peter Teazle (GB) 1784 | Highflyer; 1774 | Herod | Tartar |
| Sire Sir Peter Teazle (GB) 1784 | Highflyer; 1774 | Herod | Cypron |
| Sire Sir Peter Teazle (GB) 1784 | Highflyer; 1774 | Rachel | Blank |
| Sire Sir Peter Teazle (GB) 1784 | Highflyer; 1774 | Rachel | Regulus Mare |
| Sire Sir Peter Teazle (GB) 1784 | Papillon; 1769 | Snap | Snip |
| Sire Sir Peter Teazle (GB) 1784 | Papillon; 1769 | Snap | Sister to Slipby |
| Sire Sir Peter Teazle (GB) 1784 | Papillon; 1769 | Miss Cleveland | Regulus |
| Sire Sir Peter Teazle (GB) 1784 | Papillon; 1769 | Miss Cleveland | Midge |
| Dam Deceit (GB) 1784 | Tandem; 1773 | Syphon | Squirt |
| Dam Deceit (GB) 1784 | Tandem; 1773 | Syphon | Patriot Mare |
| Dam Deceit (GB) 1784 | Tandem; 1773 | Regulus Mare | Regulus |
| Dam Deceit (GB) 1784 | Tandem; 1773 | Regulus Mare | Snip Mare |
| Dam Deceit (GB) 1784 | Perdita; 1769 | Herod | Tartar |
| Dam Deceit (GB) 1784 | Perdita; 1769 | Herod | Cypron |
| Dam Deceit (GB) 1784 | Perdita; 1769 | Fair Forester | Sloe |
| Dam Deceit (GB) 1784 | Perdita; 1769 | Fair Forester | Forester Mare |

- Parisot was inbred 3x3 to Herod and 4x4 to Regulus, meaning that Herod and Regulus appear twice in the third and fourth generations, respectively, of her pedigree.
