= Pascal Parisot =

French songwriter and singer

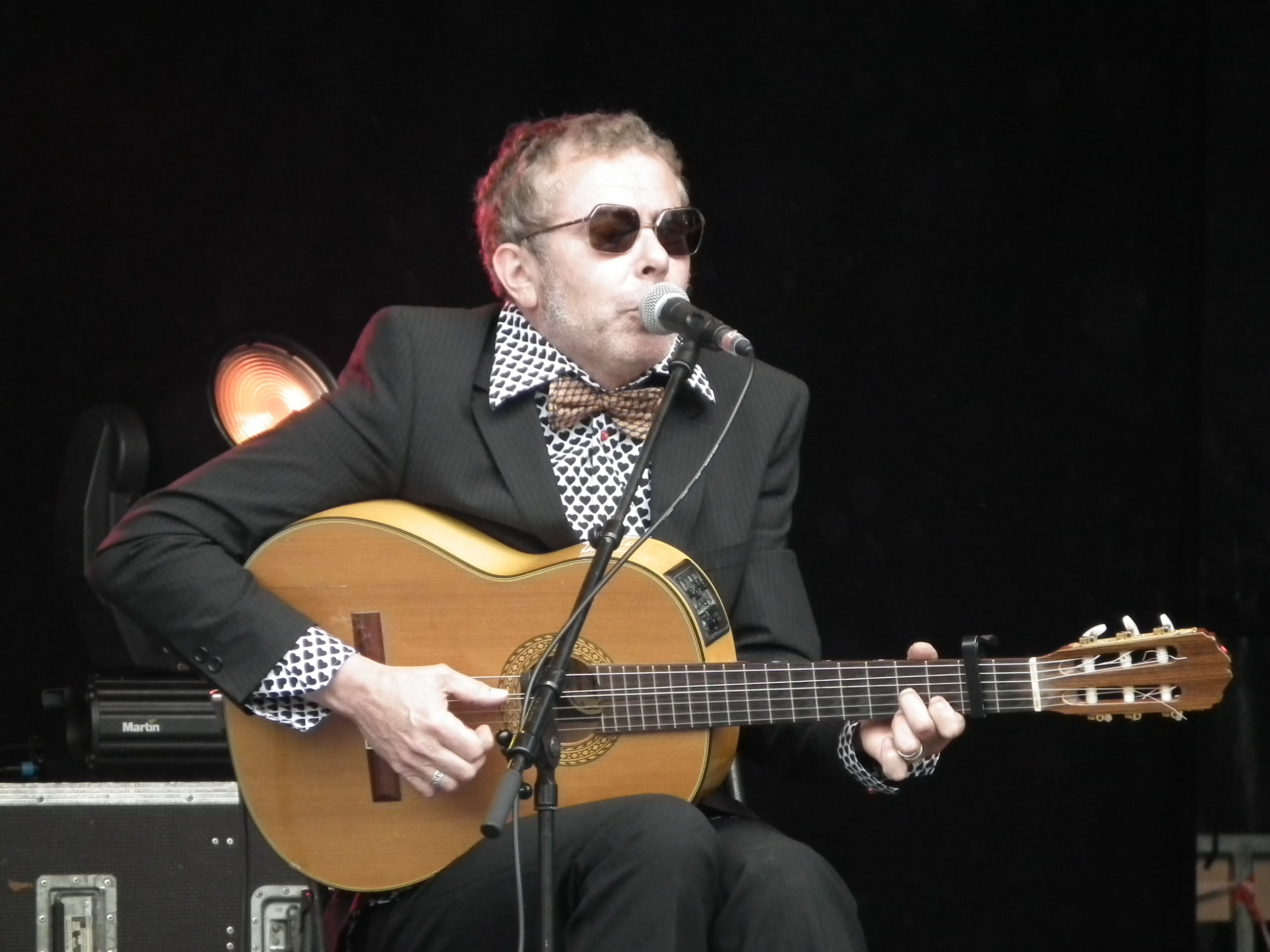
Pascal Parisot at festival, June 2013

Pascal Parisot (born 20 November 1963) is a French songwriter and singer.

== Discography ==
=== Rumba (2000) ===
1. Ca alors 03:49
2. Qui m'aime ne me suive pas 03:46
3. Diplômé de toi 03:41
4. Qui s'ignore 03:47
5. Suzanne 04:49
6. Je t'aime 03:27
7. Inutile de me faire les yeux d... 04:23
8. Ah ! Si j'avais du pognon 03:46
9. Je reste au lit 03:53
10. Tralala pas toi 04:05
11. Rumba 03:00

=== Wonderful (2003) ===
1. Wonderful 02:47
2. Que je sache 03:02
3. Tout va bien 03:54
4. Je = toi 03:35
5. Victime de l'amour 03:00
6. Les gens sont méchants 02:51
7. Moi scorpion, toi balance 03:29
8. La salle de bain 03:32
9. Sombre héros 03:11
10. Je veux être extraordinaire 03:47
11. Les gondoles à Denise 03:08
12. Lapin ! 02:34

=== Bêtes en stock (2010) ===
1. Fantaisie animale 00:27
2. On est des betes 02:41
3. Le cri de l'homme 02:29
4. Requiem pour un pou 03:37
5. J'mange de l'herbe 02:22
6. La petite souris 02:46
7. Ca sent le poney 02:36
8. Pauvre homme de cro-magnon 02:11
9. Tsé Tsé la mouche 03:05
10. Ça commence par pi 02:04
11. Like a spanish cow 02:47
12. Caniche sauvage 01:55
13. Pas de chat, pas de chien 03:31
14. Ho hisse 02:21
