= Leonardo Masu =

Italian weightlifter

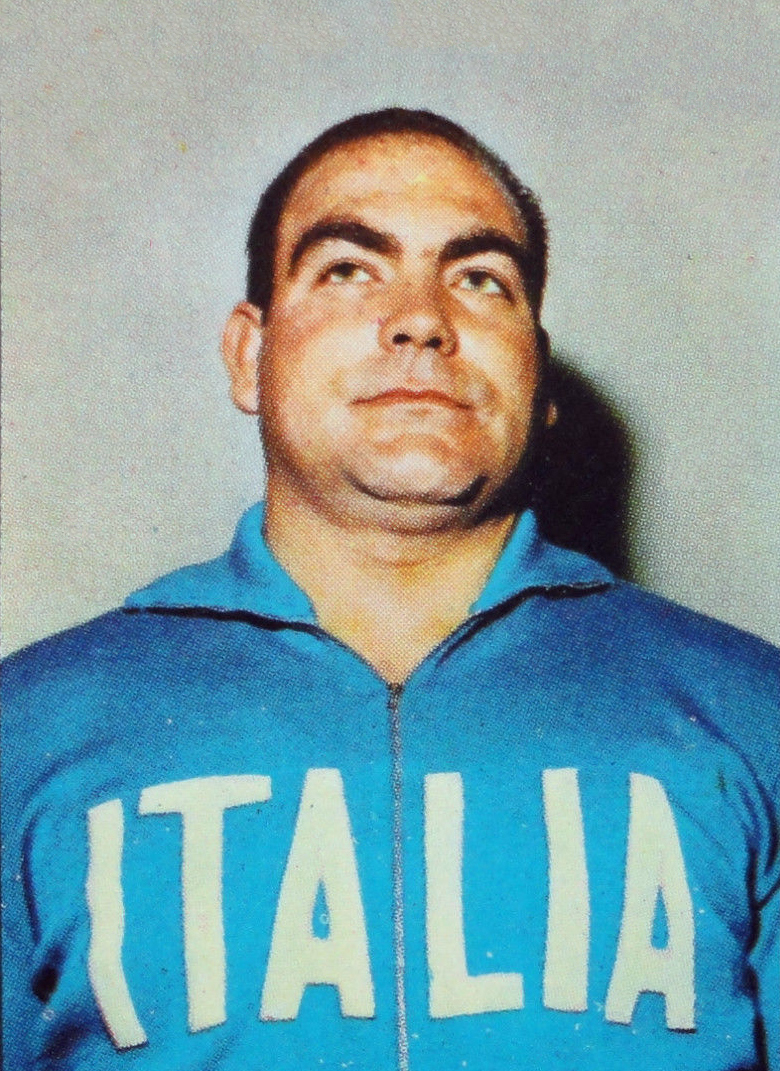

Personal information
- Born: 5 May 1934 Nuoro, Italy
- Died: 11 January 2010 (aged 75) Nuoro, Italy
- Height: 1.74 m (5 ft 9 in)
- Weight: 90 kg (200 lb)

Sport
- Sport: Weightlifting
- Club: G.S. Fiamme Oro, Rome

Leonardo Masu (10 May 1934 – 11 January 2010) was an Italian weightlifter. He competed at the 1960 Summer Olympics in the middle-heavyweight class and finished in eighth place. He was born and died in Nuoro, Italy.
