= 1832 in France =

- Decades: 1810s; 1820s; 1830s; 1840s; 1850s
- See also: History of France; Timeline of French history; List of years in France

Events from the year 1832 in France.

== Incumbents ==
- Monarch – Louis Philippe I

== Events ==
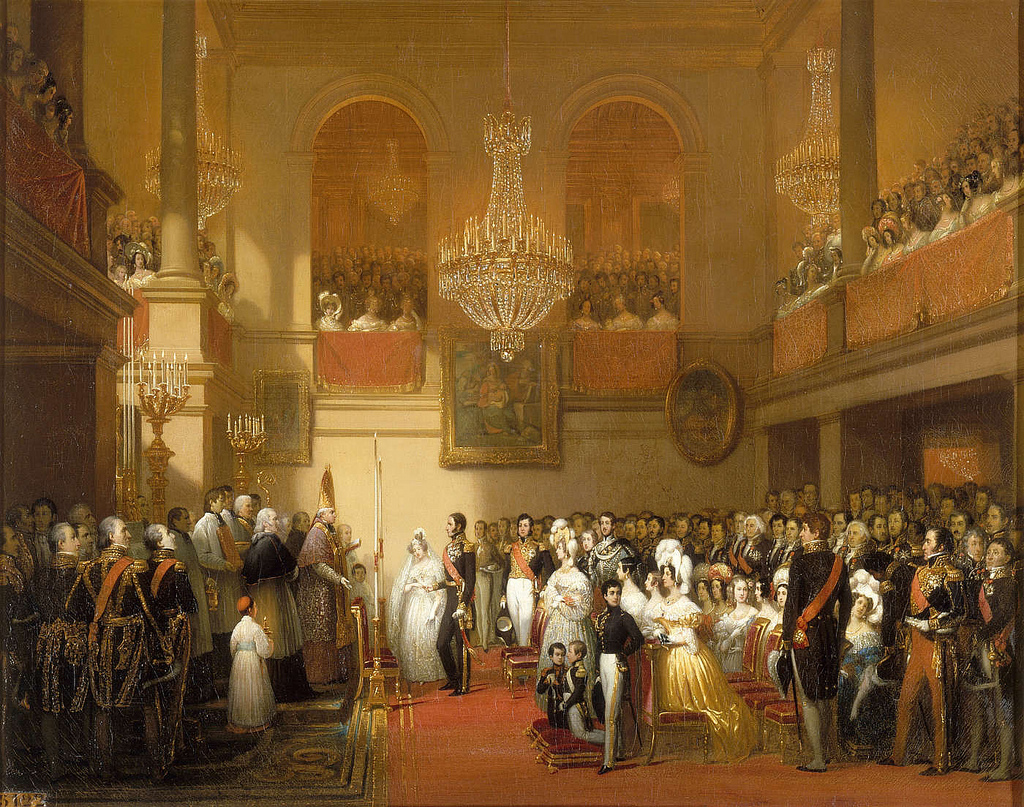
The Wedding of Leopold I of Belgium and Louise of Orléans by Joseph-Désiré Court

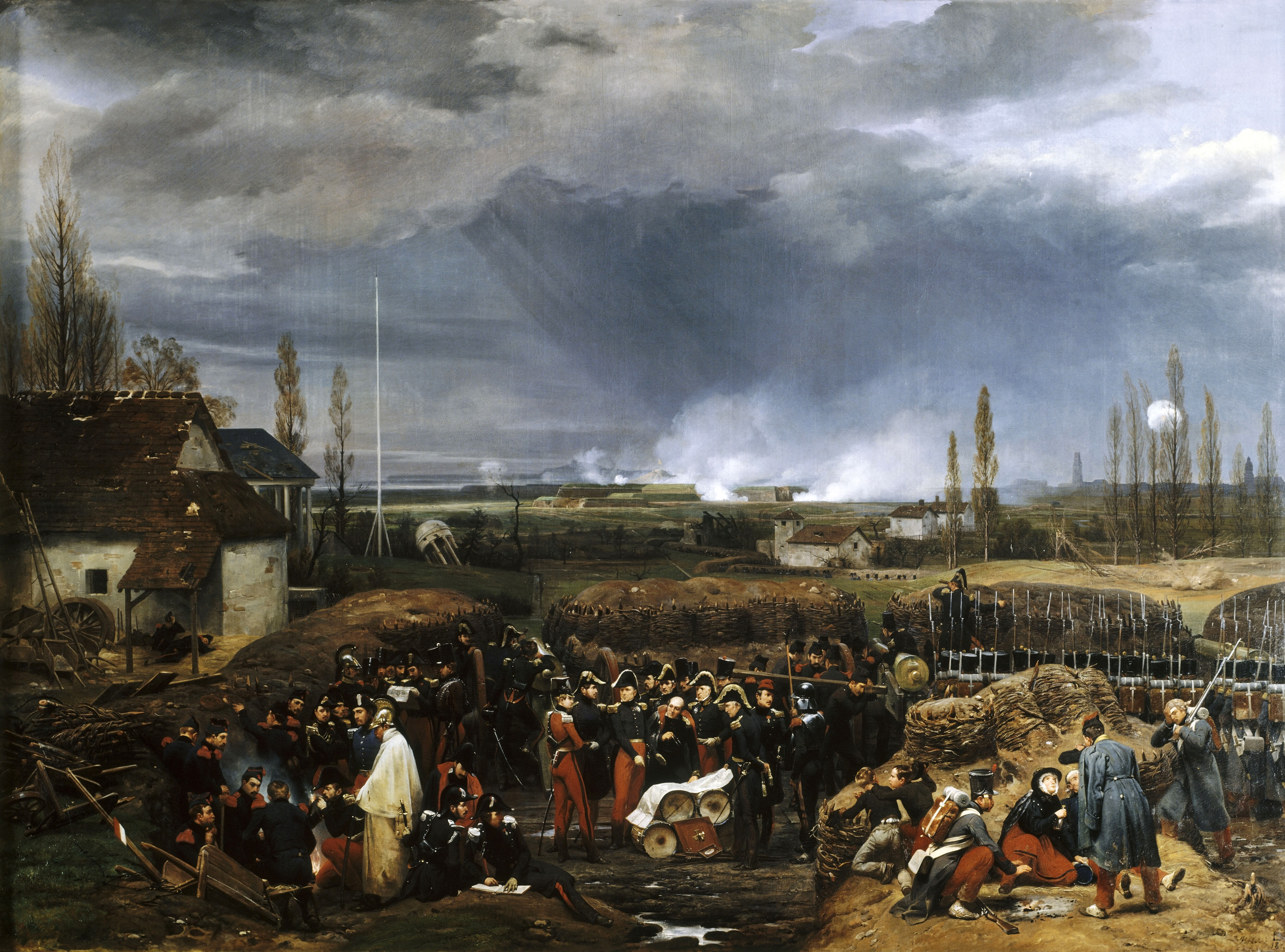
The Siege of Antwerp by Horace Vernet

- 22 February – French Expedition to Ancona occupies Ancona in Italy, remaining until 1838
- 5 June - Anti-monarchist June Rebellion briefly breaks out in Paris.
- 9 August – Leopold I of Belgium and marries Louise of Orléans, the eldest daughter of the French king, at the Château de Compiègne
- 4–23 December - Siege of Antwerp: the last remaining Dutch defensive point, the citadel, falls to French attack.

== Arts and literature ==
- 26 February - Chopin gives his debut Paris concert at the Salle Pleyel.
- September - The Opéra-Comique moves from Salle Ventadour to Salle de la Bourse in Paris.
- Théâtre des Folies-Dramatiques opens on the site of the Théâtre de l'Ambigu-Comique on the Boulevard du Temple in Paris under Frédérick Lemaître.
- Honoré de Balzac publishes the novels La Bourse, Le Curé de Tours, Le Colonel Chabert and Louis Lambert.

== Births ==
- 6 January - Gustave Doré, artist, engraver, illustrator and sculptor (died 1883)
- 23 January - Édouard Manet, painter (died 1883)
- 16 February - Camille Armand Jules Marie, Prince de Polignac, nobleman, scholar and major general in the Confederate States Army (died 1913)
- 12 March
  - Jean Alfred Fournier, dermatologist (died 1914)
  - Charles Friedel, chemist and mineralogist (died 1889)
- 26 March - Michel Bréal, philologist (died 1915)
- 25 May - Marie-Louise Gagneur, née Mignerot, feminist (died 1902)
- 6 July - Alexis André, missionary priest in Canada (died 1893)
- 29 September - Léon Labbé, surgeon and politician (died 1916)
- 15 December - Gustave Eiffel, structural engineer and architect, designer of the Eiffel Tower (died 1923)
- Full date unknown - Félicien Henry Caignart de Saulcy, entomologist (died 1912).

== Deaths ==
=== January to June ===
- 4 March - Jean-François Champollion, classical scholar, philologist and orientalist (born 1790).
- 13 April - Jean-Baptiste Jacques Augustin, painter (born 1759).
- 23 April - François-Nicolas Delaistre, sculptor (born 1746).
- 7 May - Charles Guillaume Alexandre Bourgeois, physicist and painter (born 1759).
- 13 May - Georges Cuvier, naturalist and zoologist (born 1769).
- 16 May - Casimir Pierre Périer, statesman (born 1777).
- 26 May - François-Louis Perne, composer and musicographer (born 1772).
- 31 May - Évariste Galois, mathematician (born 1811).
- 1 June - Jean Maximilien Lamarque, statesman (born 1770).
- 4 June - Jean-Pierre Abel-Rémusat, sinologist (born 1788).
- 5 June - 166 deaths at the barricades in the June Rebellion

=== July to December ===
- 22 July - Napoleon II, son of Napoleon I (born 1811).
- 23 July - Louis-François Jeannet, general (born 1768).
- 17 August - Pierre Yrieix Daumesnil, soldier (born 1776).
- 24 August - Nicolas Léonard Sadi Carnot, physicist and military engineer (born 1796).
- 9 September - Charles Mathieu Isidore Decaen, general (born 1769).
- 15 November - Jean-Baptiste Say, economist and businessman (born 1767).
