= 1835 in France =

- Decades: 1810s; 1820s; 1830s; 1840s; 1850s
- See also: History of France; Timeline of French history; List of years in France

Events from the year 1835 in France.

== Incumbents ==
- Monarch – Louis Philippe I

== Events ==
- March – Balzac's novel Le Père Goriot is first published in book form.
- July 28 – In Paris, the assassination of Louis Philippe I is attempted by Giuseppe Marco Fieschi using a home-made volley gun. Eighteen are killed but the King escapes with a minor wound.
- August – The September Laws ban all criticism of Louis Philippe and regulate publications and the theatre.
- The French word for their language changes to français, from françois.
- Charles-Louis Havas creates Havas, the first French news agency (which later spawns Agence France-Presse).

== Births ==
- 18 April - François Perrier, general and geodesist (died 1888)
- 15 May - Émile Léonard Mathieu, mathematician (died 1890)
- 31 May - Alphonse-Marie-Adolphe de Neuville, painter (died 1885)
- 31 July - Henri Brisson, statesman and Prime minister of France (died 1912)
- 2 October - Louis-Antoine Ranvier, physician, pathologist, anatomist and histologist (died 1922)
- 9 October - Camille Saint-Saëns, composer, organist, conductor (died 1921)

=== Full date unknown ===
- Frédéric Febvre, actor (died 1916)

== Deaths ==
- 8 February - Guillaume Dupuytren, anatomist and military surgeon (born 1777)
- 10 April - Pierre Clement de Laussat, politician, last French Governor of Louisiana (born 1756)
- 24 June - Jacques Claude Beugnot, politician (born 1761)
- 25 July - François René Mallarmé, politician (born 1755)
- 28 July - Édouard Adolphe Casimir Joseph Mortier, Marshal of France (born 1768)
- 18 September - Jean Joseph Antoine de Courvoisier, magistrate and politician (born 1775)
- 17 December - Pierre Louis Roederer, politician, economist, and historian (born 1754)

=== Full date unknown ===
- Hippolyte Pixii, instrument maker (born 1808)
