= 1895 in France =

- Decades: 1870s; 1880s; 1890s; 1900s; 1910s
- See also: History of France; Timeline of French history; List of years in France

Events from the year 1895 in France.

== Incumbents ==
- President: Jean Casimir-Perier (until 15 January), Felix Faure (starting 16 January)
- President of the Council of Ministers:
  - until 26 January: Charles Dupuy
  - 26 January–1 November: Alexandre Ribot
  - starting 1 November: Léon Bourgeois

== Events ==
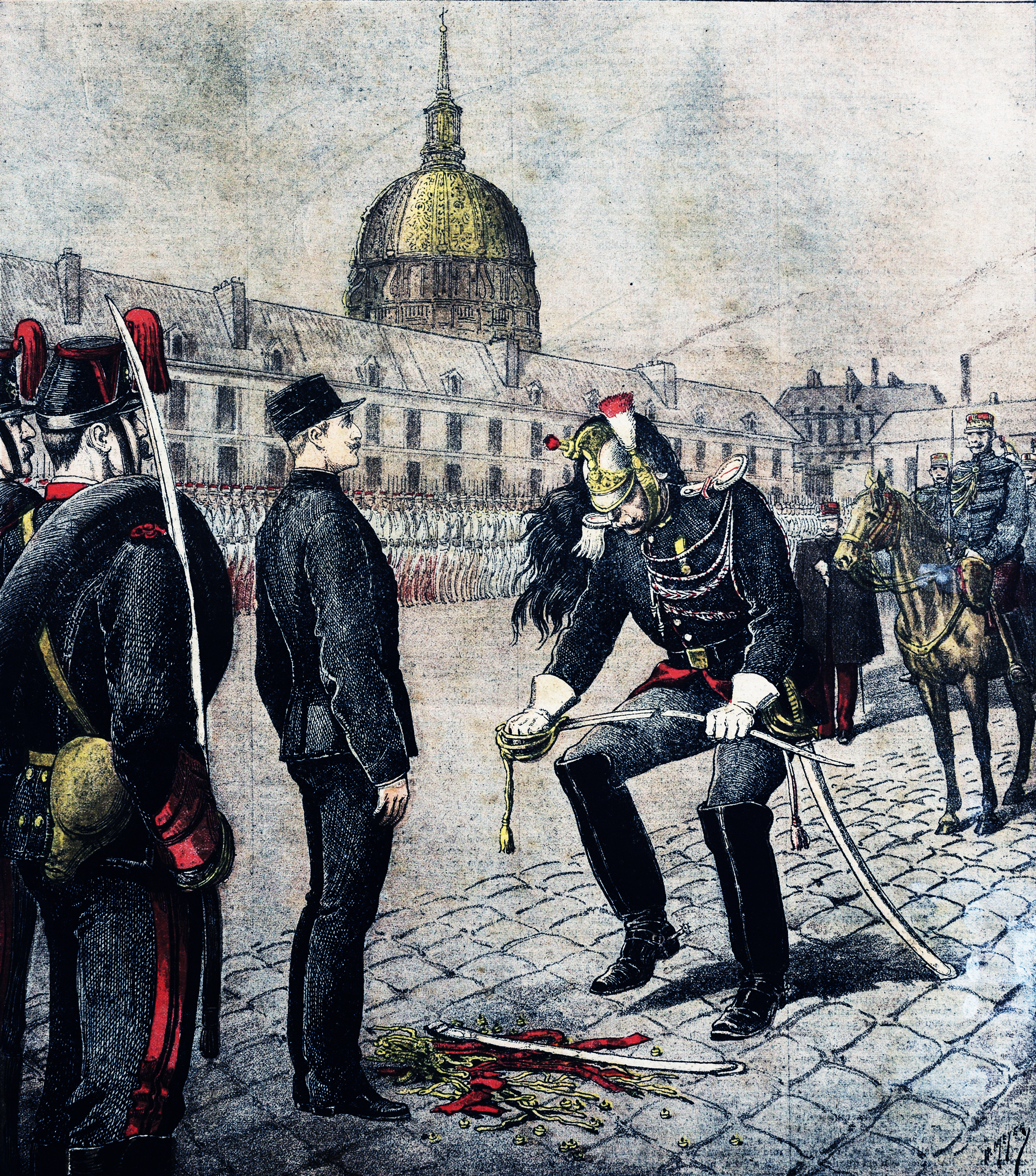
Dreyfus affair

- 1 January – Alphonse Mucha's lithographed poster for the play Gismonda starring Sarah Bernhardt is posted in Paris. Bernhardt is so satisfied with its success that she gives Mucha a six-year contract.
- 5 January – The military degradation of Alfred Dreyfus takes place on the Champ de Mars, Paris.
- 17 January – Félix Faure is elected President of French Republic after the resignation of Jean Casimir-Perier.
- 17 January – Dreyfus is moved into a military reformatory on the island of Ré.
- 21 February – Dreyfus is put on board ship to be exiled.
- 15 March – Dreyfus is landed on Devil's Island off French Guiana.
- 22 March – Brothers Auguste and Louis Lumière make what is probably the first presentation of a projected celluloid film moving picture, the 46-second Workers Leaving the Lumière Factory, to members of the Société d'encouragement pour l'industrie nationale in Paris.
- 3 July – Painter Paul Gauguin leaves France to settle permanently in Polynesia.
- 27 August – Swami Vivekananda is invited by the Paris Congress to deliver a speech on Psychic Prana.
- 1 October – French troops capture Antananarivo, Madagascar.
- November – Painter Paul Cézanne has his first solo exhibition, at the Paris gallery of Ambroise Vollard.
- 22 October – Montparnasse derailment: A railway locomotive runs through the exterior wall of the Gare Montparnasse terminus in Paris.
- 28 December – Auguste and Louis Lumière make what is probably the first commercial public screening of projected moving picture films to a paying audience, at the Salon Indien du Grand Café in Paris.

== Literature ==
- Joris-Karl Huysmans - En Route
- Jules Verne - L'Île à hélice

== Sport ==
- 11 June – The Paris–Bordeaux–Paris automobile trial is held.
- 24 September–31 October – The Automobile Club de France sponsors the longest race to date, a 1,710 km (1,060 mi) event from Bordeaux to Agen and back. Because it is held in ten stages, it can be considered the first rally. The first three places are taken by a Panhard, a Panhard, and a three-wheeler De Dion-Bouton.

== Births ==
=== January to March ===
- 29 January – Pierre Gaxotte, historian (died 1982)
- 11 February – Maurice Cottenet, soccer player (died 1972)
- 28 February – Marcel Pagnol, novelist, playwright and filmmaker (died 1974)
- 2 March – Marcel Carpentier, military officer (died 1977)
- 16 March – Ernest Labrousse, historian (died 1988)
- 20 March – Robert Benoist, motor racing driver and war hero (executed 1944)
- 30 March
  - Père Marie-Benoît, friar who helps smuggle Jews to safety from Nazi-occupied Southern France (died 1990)
  - Jean Giono, author (died 1970)

=== April to June ===
- 5 April – Fernand Mourlot, printer and publisher (died 1988)
- 3 May – Gabriel Chevallier, novelist (died 1969)
- 4 May – René Mayer, politician and Prime Minister of France (died 1972)
- 11 May – Jacques Brugnon, tennis player (died 1978)
- 9 June – Henri Diamant-Berger, screenwriter, film director and producer (died 1972)
- 12 June – Eugénie Brazier, cook (died 1977)

=== July to September ===
- 2 July – Gen Paul, painter and engraver (died 1975)
- 7 August – Alain Saint-Ogan, comics author and artist (died 1974)
- 20 August – Albert Gilles, copper craftsman (died 1979)
- 18 September – Jean Batmale, soccer player (died 1973)

=== October to December ===
- 9 October – René Lasserre, rugby union player (died 1965)
- 3 November – Pierre Richard-Willm, actor (died 1983)
- 5 November – Walter Gieseking, pianist and composer (died 1956)
- 20 November
  - Pierre Cot, politician (died 1977)
  - Germain Jousse, member of the French Resistance (died 1988)
- 25 November – Adrienne Bolland, test pilot and first woman to fly over the Andes (died 1975)
- 27 November – Pierre-Paul Grassé, zoologist (died 1985)
- 29 November – Edgard de Larminat, General (died 1962)
- 9 December – Marguerite Huré, stained glass artist (died 1967)
- 14 December – Paul Éluard, poet (died 1952)

== Deaths ==
=== January to June ===
- 10 January – Benjamin Godard, violinist and composer (born 1849)
- 28 January – François Certain de Canrobert, Marshal of France (born 1809)
- 29 January – Charles Frédéric Girard, biologist (born 1822)
- 16 February – André Garin, missionary and parish priest (born 1822)
- 19 February – Auguste Vacquerie, journalist and man of letters (born 1819)
- 11 March – Louis-Florentin Calmeil, psychiatrist and medical historian (born 1798)
- 22 April – Étienne Léopold Trouvelot, artist, astronomer and amateur entomologist, introduced the gypsy moth into North America (born 1827)
- 11 May – Auguste-Théodore-Paul de Broglie, professor of apologetics (born 1834)
- 22 May – Claude Marie Dubuis, second Roman Catholic bishop of Texas (born 1817)
- 28 May – Alexandre Martin, socialist statesman (born 1815)

=== July to December ===
- 19 July – Henri Ernest Baillon, botanist and physician (born 1827)
- 16 August – Mathieu Auguste Geffroy, historian (born 1820)
- 28 September – Louis Pasteur, chemist and microbiologist (born 1822)
- 24 November – Jules Barthélemy-Saint-Hilaire, philosopher, journalist and statesman (born 1805)
- 27 November – Alexandre Dumas, fils, writer, author and playwright (born 1824)
- 11 December – Jean-Baptiste Joseph Émile Montégut, critic (born 1825)
- 31 December – Père Jean Marie Delavay, missionary, explorer and botanist (born 1834)

== See also ==
- List of French films before 1910
