= André Broc =

French jurist and public servant

- Born: 4 December 1909; Arras, France
- Died: 5 January 1997 (aged 89); Bueil, Eure, France
- Education: Sciences Po Paris
- Occupations: Jurist, Civil servant
- Notable work: La qualité de juif: Une notion juridique nouvelle
- Awards: Chevalier of the Légion d'honneur

André Broc (4 December 1909 in Arras – 5 January 1997 in Bueil) was a French civil servant and jurist. He is known for his research work on the legal definition of "Jewishness" and for his involvement in the development of police tools used in the persecution of Jews under the Vichy regime.

== Early life and education ==
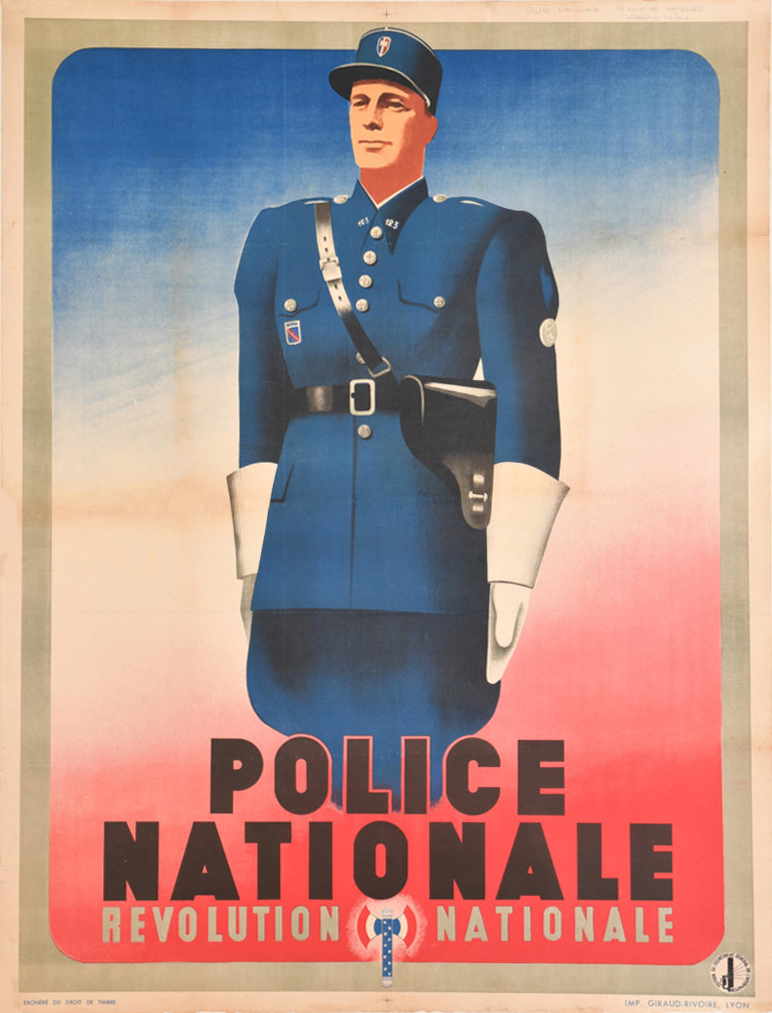
Propaganda poster for recruitment into the Vichy regime's Police Nationale

André Broc, born in Arras in 1909, attended Sciences Po Paris in 1933. During World War II, he worked within the Sub-Directorate of Jewish Affairs at the Paris Police Prefecture. Broc was a close associate of Georges Montandon. On 15 December 1942, Broc defended a doctoral thesis in law titled La qualification juive ("Jewishness") at the University of Paris Faculty of Law. His thesis committee included three prominent legal scholars: Achille Mestre (thesis advisor), Pierre Lampué, a specialist in French colonial law, and Georges Scelle, an expert in public international law. The thesis received the highest distinction and was published by the Presses universitaires de France under the title La qualification juive. In 1943, it was republished as La qualité de juif: Une notion juridique nouvelle ("Jewishness: A New Legal Notion").

According to Danièle Lochak, the thesis, ostensibly based on a scientific and sociological approach, served primarily as a practical tool for racial identification.

== Post-liberation ==
At the liberation of France, Broc defended himself before the épuration commission, denying any antisemitism in his thesis and claiming to have rendered services. He remained at the Paris Police Prefecture, overseeing archives alongside Hélène Tulard, the wife of his former director, André Tulard. Broc later became active in union activities within the Prefecture.

== Distinction under the Fifth Republic ==
In 1958, Broc was awarded the Légion d'honneur in the presence of General Charles de Gaulle. The event sparked controversy when Eugène Saint-Bastien, a French Communist Party member, protested vehemently during a Council of Paris session, holding a copy of Broc's book on "Jewishness".

== See also ==
- Antisemitism in France
