= 1836 in France =

- Decades: 1810s; 1820s; 1830s; 1840s; 1850s
- See also: History of France; Timeline of French history; List of years in France

Events from the year 1836 in France.

== Incumbents ==
- Monarch – Louis Philippe I

== Events ==
- 29 July - The Arc de Triomphe in Paris is inaugurated.
- Eugène Schneider and his brother Adolphe Schneider purchase a bankrupt ironworks near the town of Le Creusot in the Burgundy region and found the steelworks and engineering company Schneider Frères & Cie.
- Louis Napoleon, the nephew of the former Emperor, launches the Strasbourg Coup, a failed attempt to seize power

== Births ==
- 3 January - Marie François Oscar Bardy de Fourtou, politician (died 1897)
- 14 January - Henri Fantin-Latour, painter and lithographer (died 1904)
- 21 February - Léo Delibes, composer (died 1891)
- 26 March - Mélanie de Pourtalès, salonnière and courtier (died 1914)
- 31 May - Jules Chéret, painter and lithographer (died 1932)
- 26 June - Émile Étienne Guimet, industrialist, traveller and connoisseur (died 1918)
- 4 October - Juliette Adam, writer (died 1936)
- 15 October - James Tissot, painter (died 1902)
- 20 December - Alfred Grandidier, naturalist and explorer (died 1921)

=== Full date unknown ===
- Jean Pierre Philippe Lampué, photographer (died 1924)

== Deaths ==
- 9 January - Pierre François Lacenaire, poet and criminal, double murderer (executed) (born 1803)
- 21 January - André Étienne d'Audebert de Férussac, naturalist (born 1786)
- 7 March - Français of Nantes, politician and author (born 1756)
- 10 June - André-Marie Ampère, physicist (born 1775)
- 26 June - Claude Joseph Rouget de Lisle, army captain, writer of La Marseillaise (born 1760)
- 23 July - Jean-Félix Adolphe Gambart, astronomer (TB) (born 1800)
- 25 July - Armand Carrel, writer (duel) (born 1800)
- 21 August - Claude-Louis Navier, engineer and physicist (born 1785)
- 17 September - Antoine Laurent de Jussieu, botanist (born 1748)
- 30 November - Pierre-Simon Girard, mathematician and engineer (born 1765)
