= 1830 in France =

- Decades: 1810s; 1820s; 1830s; 1840s; 1850s
- See also: History of France; Timeline of French history; List of years in France

Events from the year 1830 in France.

== Incumbents ==
- Monarch –

Charles X (abdicated 2 August)
Vacant (2–9 August)
Louis Philippe I (from 9 August)

== Events ==
- July 5 – French invasion of Algiers in 1830.
- July 17 – Barthélemy Thimonnier is granted a patent (#7454) for a sewing machine. It chain stitches at 200/minute.
- July 25 – Rioting breaks out in Paris against Charles X
- July 26 – The July Ordinances are published.
- July 27–29 – July Revolution ("Three Glorious Days") – people in Paris rebel against the Ordinance of St. Cloud by King Charles X of France and clash against the National Guard – 1,800 rioters and 300 soldiers die and the king has to flee the capital.
- August 2 – Abdication of King Charles X in favor of his grandson, Henry, Count of Chambord, who is not allowed to take the throne.
- August 9 – The Duke of Orleans becomes King Louis Philippe. François-René de Chateaubriand sacrifices his political career by refusing to swear an oath of allegiance to the new king and retires to write his memoirs.
- August 13 – Louis Philippe appoints the Duc de Broglie as Prime Minister.
- November 2 – Jacques Laffitte succeeds the Duc de Broglie as prime minister.

== Arts and literature ==
- 25 February – The première of Victor Hugo's play Hernani in Paris is marked by protests from an audience who recognise it as an attack on Classicism.
- c. October – Eugène Delacroix's paints Liberty Leading the People commemorating the July Revolution.
- November – Publication of Stendhal's historical psychological novel The Red and the Black (Le Rouge et le Noir) in Paris.
- 5 December – World premiere of Hector Berlioz's most famous work, Symphonie fantastique, at the Conservatoire de Paris.

== Births ==
- 23 February – Henri Meilhac, dramatist and opera librettist (died 1897)
- 10 April – Pierre Paul Dehérain, chemist and botanist (died 1902)
- 10 July – Camille Pissarro, painter (died 1903)
- 8 September – Frédéric Mistral, poet, shares the Nobel Prize in Literature in 1904 (died 1914)
- 17 December – Jules de Goncourt, writer (died 1870)

== Deaths ==
- 4 February – Marc Antoine de Beaumont, nobleman and soldier (born 1763)
- 15 February – Antoine Marie Chamans, comte de Lavalette, soldier and politician (born 1769)
- 17 March – Laurent, Marquis de Gouvion Saint-Cyr, marshal (born 1764)
- 31 July – Joseph Philippe de Clairville, botanist and entomologist (born 1742)
- 30 August – Louis Henri, Prince of Condé (born 1756)
- 7 November – Joseph Barbanègre, soldier (born 1772)
- 29 November – Charles Simon Catel, composer and teacher (born 1773)
- Rosalie Duthé, courtesan and artists' model (born 1748)
