= 1828 in France =

- Decades: 1800s; 1810s; 1820s; 1830s; 1840s
- See also: History of France; Timeline of French history; List of years in France

Events from the year 1828 in France.

== Incumbents ==
- Monarch – Charles X
- Prime Minister – Joseph de Villèle (until 4 January), then Jean Baptiste Gay

== Events ==
- 4 January - Jean Baptiste Gay, vicomte de Martignac succeeds Jean-Baptiste Guillaume Joseph, comte de Villèle as Prime Minister of France.

== Births ==
- 8 February - Jules Verne, author (died 1905)
- 14 February - Edmond François Valentin About, novelist, publicist and journalist (died 1885)
- 15 April - Jean Danjou, French Foreign Legion (died 1863 in Mexico)
- 13 June - Elie Delaunay, painter (died 1891)
- 19 June - Charles Tellier, engineer (died 1913)
- 17 August - Maria Deraismes, author and pioneer for women's rights (died 1894)
- 10 November - Hector-Jonathan Crémieux, librettist and playwright (died 1892)
- 26 November - René Goblet, politician, Prime Minister of France (died 1905)

=== Full date unknown ===
- Amédée Courbet, admiral (died 1885)
- Louise Laffon, photographer (died 1885)

== Deaths ==
- 10 January - François de Neufchâteau, statesman, poet, and scientist (born 1750)
- 29 January - Ambrose Maréchal, third Archbishop of Baltimore, Maryland (born 1764)
- 15 May - Jean-Pierre Maransin, general (born 1770)
- 15 July - Jean-Antoine Houdon, sculptor (born 1741)
- 10 September - Antoine-François Andréossy, general and diplomat (born 1761)
- 3 November - Jean-Joseph, Marquis Dessolles, statesman and Prime Minister (born 1767)
- 31 December - Louis-Benoît Picard, playwright (born 1769)

=== Full date unknown ===
- Joseph Frédéric Bérard, physician and philosopher (born 1789)
- François Antoine de Boissy d'Anglas, statesman (born 1756)
