= 1809 in France =

- Decades: 1780s; 1790s; 1800s; 1810s; 1820s
- See also: History of France; Timeline of French history; List of years in France

Events from the year 1809 in France.

== Incumbents ==
- Emperor – Napoleon I

== Events ==
- 13 January - Battle of Uclés, French victory over Spanish.
- 16 January - Battle of Corunna, inconclusive battle between British and French forces.
- 8 February - Franz I of Austria declares war on France.
- 20 February - Second Siege of Zaragoza ends with French victory.
- 25 February - Battle of Valls, French victory over Spanish forces.
- 17 March - Battle of Villafranca, French garrison forced to surrender to Spanish.
- 27 March - Battle of Ciudad Real, French victory over Spanish forces.
- 28 March - First Battle of Porto, French victory over Portuguese forces.
- 28 March - Battle of Medellín, decisive French victory over Spain.
- 11 April - Battle of the Basque Roads, naval battle, British attack on French fleet.
- 16 April - Battle of Sacile, Austrian victory over French forces.
- 19 April - Battle of Teugen-Hausen, French victory over Austria.
- 19 April - Battle of Ratisbon begins.
- 20 April - Battle of Abensberg, French victory over Austria.
- 21 April - Battle of Landshut, French victory over Austria.
- 21 April - Battle of Eckmühl begins.
- 22 April - Battle of Eckmühl ends with victory for French over Austrian forces.
- 23 April - Battle of Ratisbon ends with French victory over Austria.
- 3 May - Battle of Ebelsberg, French victory over Austria.
- 6 May - Third Siege of Gerona begins as French fight to capture the Spanish garrison.
- 7 May - Battle of Piave River begins.
- 8 May - Battle of Piave River ends with victory for Franco-Italian forces over Austrian forces.
- 10 May - Battle of Grijó begins.
- 11 May - Battle of Grijó ends in Anglo-Portuguese victory over the French.
- 12 May - Second Battle of Porto, Anglo-Portuguese victory over French forces which retreat from the city.
- 21 May - Battle of Aspern-Essling begins as Napoleon attempts a forced crossing of the Danube near Vienna.
- 22 May - Battle of Aspern-Essling ends in defeat for Napoleon, the first time he had been personally defeated in over a decade.
- 23 May - Battle of Alcañiz, Spanish victory over French.
- 14 June - Battle of Raab, Franco-Italian victory over Austria.
- 15 June - Battle of María, French victory over Spanish.
- 5 July - Battle of Wagram begins.
- 6 July - Battle of Wagram ends with French victory over Austria, effectively bringing the War of the Fifth Coalition to an end.
- 8 July - Battle of Gefrees, Austrian victory over French forces.
- 12 July - Armistice of Znaim, ceasefire agreed, effectively ending hostilities between Austria and France in the War of the Fifth Coalition.
- 27 July - Battle of Talavera begins.
- 28 July - Battle of Talavera ends, inconclusive battle between French and British forces.
- 11 August - Battle of Almonacid, French victory over Spanish.
- 14 October - Treaty of Schönbrunn, signed between France and Austria, who were defeated and had to cede territory.
- 18 October - Battle of Tamamés, Spanish victory over French.
- 19 November - Battle of Ocaña, French inflicted upon the Spanish army its greatest single defeat in the Peninsular War.
- 26 November - Battle of Alba de Tormes, French army routed retreating Spanish army.
- 12 December - Siege of Gerona ends as Spanish forced to capitulate by disease and famine.

== Births ==
- 4 January - Louis Braille, teacher, inventor of braille (died 1852)
- 15 January - Pierre-Joseph Proudhon, political philosopher (died 1865)
- 20 January - Napoléon Peyrat, author and historian (died 1881)
- 23 March - Jean-Hippolyte Flandrin, painter (died 1864)
- 24 March - Joseph Liouville, mathematician (died 1882)
- 27 June - François Certain de Canrobert, Marshal of France (died 1895)
- 8 November - Richard Hartmann, German engineering manufacturer (died 1878)

== Deaths ==
- 27 March - Joseph-Marie Vien, painter (born 1716)
- 31 May - Jean Lannes, General (mortally wounded in battle) (born 1769)
- 6 July - Antoine Charles Louis de Lasalle, Cavalry general (killed in battle) (born 1775)
