= 1915 in France =

- Decades: 1890s; 1900s; 1910s; 1920s; 1930s
- See also: History of France; Timeline of French history; List of years in France

Events from the year 1915 in France.

== Incumbents ==
- President: Raymond Poincaré
- President of the Council of Ministers: René Viviani (until 29 October), Aristide Briand (starting 29 October)

== Events ==
- 19 January – Georges Claude patents the neon discharge tube for use in advertising.
- 27 January – French military casualties begin arriving at the Hôpital Temporaire d'Arc-en-Barrois, established earlier in the month by British volunteers.
- 2 April – Croix de guerre instituted as a military decoration.
- 18 April – Roland Garros lands his aircraft behind enemy lines and is taken prisoner.
- 9 May – Second Battle of Artois starts.
- 15 May – Second Battle of Artois ends in stalemate.
- July – Adrian helmet first issued to the French Army.
- 10 September – Satirical weekly newspaper Le Canard enchaîné first published.
- 15 September – Third Battle of Artois begins.
- 25 September
  - Battle of Loos begins, a major British offensive on the Western Front; first British use of poison gas during World War I.
  - Second Battle of Champagne begins.
- 28 September – Battle of Loos ends with British retreat.
- 16 October – France declares war on Bulgaria.
- 4 November – Third Battle of Artois ends.
- 6 November – Second Battle of Champagne ends.

== Births ==
=== January to March ===
- 13 January – Antoine Guillaumont, archaeologist and Syriac scholar (died 2000)
- 14 January – André Frossard, journalist and essayist (died 1995)
- 31 January – Henri Dobert, mechanical or electrician worker, World War II resistant (died 1943)
- 18 February – Marcel Landowski, composer, biographer and arts administrator (died 1999)
- 1 March – Gustave Choquet, mathematician (died 2006)
- 7 March – Jacques Chaban-Delmas, Gaullist politician and Prime Minister (died 2000)
- 24 March – Eugène Martin, motor racing driver (died 2006)

=== April to June ===
- 2 April – Jean Sauvagnargues, politician and Minister (died 2002)
- 3 April – Paul Touvier, convicted of crime against humanity for collaborationism in Vichy France (died 1996)
- 20 April – Émile Muller, politician (died 1988)
- 6 May – Achille Zavatta, clown and circus operator (died 1993)
- 12 May – Frère Roger, founder of the Taizé community (died 2005)
- 21 June – Jean Bastien, soccer player (died 1969)

=== July to December ===
- 31 July – Henri Decaë, cinematographer (died 1987)
- 19 August – Alphonse Antoine, cyclist (died 1999)
- 22 October – Jules Bigot, soccer player and manager (died 2007)
- 22 October – Jean Despeaux, boxer, Olympic gold-medallist (died 1989)
- 9 November – André François, cartoonist (died 2005)
- 12 November – Roland Barthes, literary critic and philosopher (died 1980)
- 17 November
  - Michel Arnaud, general (died 1990)
  - Albert Malbois, Roman Catholic prelate (died 2017)
- November – Jean Neuberth, abstract painter (died 1966)
- 17 December – André Claveau, singer (died 2003)
- 19 December – Édith Piaf, singer (died 1963)

== Deaths ==
- 8 April – Louis Pergaud, novelist (killed in action) (born 1882)
- 10 May – Gaston Cros, army officer and archaeologist (killed in action) (born 1861)
- 5 June – Henri Gaudier-Brzeska, painter and sculptor (killed in action) (born 1891)
- 25 July – Virginie Amélie Avegno Gautreau, socialite, model for Portrait of Madame X (born 1859)
- 31 August – Adolphe Pégoud, French acrobatic pilot, World War I fighter ace (killed in action) (born 1889)
- 15 September – Alfred Agache, painter (born 1843)
- 31 August – Adolphe Pégoud, acrobatic pilot, World War I fighter ace (killed in action) (born 1889)
- 11 October – Jean Henri Fabre, entomologist (born 1823)
- 25 November – Michel Bréal, philologist (born 1832)

== See also ==
- List of French films of 1915
