= 1833 in France =

- Decades: 1810s; 1820s; 1830s; 1840s; 1850s
- See also: History of France; Timeline of French history; List of years in France

Events from the year 1833 in France (July Monarchy).

== Incumbents ==
- Monarch – Louis Philippe I

== Events ==
- 28 June - Law promulgated by François Guizot requires every commune or municipality to maintain a public primary school.
- 1 December - Launch of Le Ménestrel, a weekly music journal; it survives until 1940.

== Births ==
- 12 February - Charles-Wilfrid de Bériot, pianist, teacher and composer (died 1914)
- 4 March - Antoine Alphonse Chassepot, gunsmith and inventor (died 1905)
- 17 April - Arthur Arnould, anarchist (died 1895)
- 20 August - Gustave Denis, industrialist (died 1925)
- 8 October - André Theuriet, poet and novelist (died 1907)
- 30 November – Jules Liégeois, jurist, member of the Nancy School of Hypnosis (died 1908)

== Deaths ==
- 12 January - Marie-Antoine Carême, chef (born 1784)
- 19 January - Ferdinand Hérold, composer (born 1791)
- 3 February - Henri François Delaborde, general (born 1764)
- 27 March - Louis Fursy Henri Compère, soldier (born 1768)
- 10 May - François Andrieux, dramatist (born 1759)
- 5 July - Nicéphore Niépce, inventor, pioneer photographer (born 1765)
- 6 July - Pierre-Narcisse Guérin, painter (born 1774)
- 3 October - François, marquis de Chasseloup-Laubat, general and military engineer (born 1754)
- 17 October - François-Isidore Gagelin, missionary (born 1799)
