= 1820 in France =

- Decades: 1800s; 1810s; 1820s; 1830s; 1840s
- See also: History of France; Timeline of French history; List of years in France

Events from the year 1820 in France.

== Incumbents ==
- Monarch – Louis XVIII
- Prime Minister – Élie, duc Decazes (until 20 February), then Armand-Emmanuel de Vignerot du Plessis, Duc de Richelieu

== Events ==
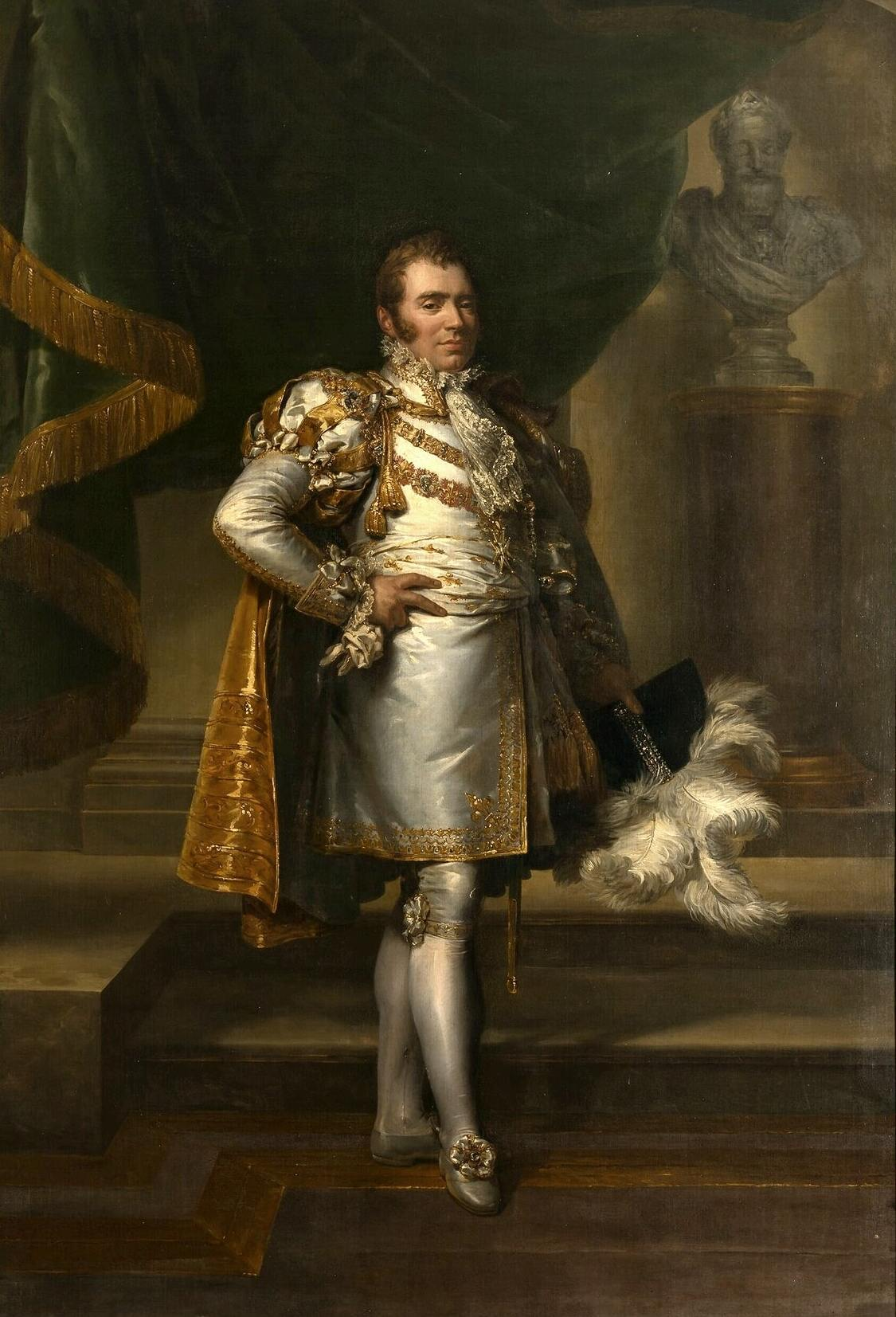
Portrait of the Duke of Berry; by François Gérard

- 13 February – . The Assassination of the Duke of Berry at the Paris Opera.Charles Ferdinand d'Artois, Duke of Berry, the nephew of the king is assassinated by a fanatic. The Prime Minister, Elie Louis, Duke of Decazes and Glücksbierg is held indirectly for the crime by the Ultra-royalists and forced to resign from the government
- 12 June – Élie Decazes, leader of the opposition in the Chamber of Deputies, successfully introduces the "Law of the Double Vote", a proposal to add to the 258 existing legislators by creating 172 seats that would be "selected by special electoral colleges" made up of the wealthiest 25% of voters in each of France's departments.
- 31 July – A fire breaks out in the wine depot at the Bercy section of Paris. It is reported later that "In the absence of water to supply the engines, an attempt was made to extinguish the flames with wine— of which a lake of 50 ft. square and more than a foot deep was formed; but the fire continued to rage, as well it might, being supplied by alcohol, and great destruction of property resulted.
- 4 November – Legislative election held.
- 13 November – Legislative election held.
- Public gas lighting in Paris.

== Births ==
- 16 January – Pierre Louis Rouillard, sculptor (died 1881)
- 20 January – Alexandre-Emile Béguyer de Chancourtois, geologist and mineralogist (died 1886)
- 20 February – Gustave Nadaud, songwriter and chansonnier (died 1893)
- 30 April – Edouard Louis Dubufe, painter (died 1883)
- 11 June – Alexandre Bertrand, archaeologist (died 1902)
- 17 September – Émile Augier, dramatist (died 1889)
- 29 September – Henry, Count of Chambord, Legitimist Pretender to the throne of France (died 1883)
- 24 October – Eugène Fromentin, painter and writer (died 1876)
- 8 November – Hippolyte Castille, writer (died 1886)

=== Full date unknown ===
- Antoine-Élisabeth-Cléophas Dareste de la Chavanne, historian (died 1882)
- Léon Fairmaire, entomologist (died 1906)
- Mathieu Auguste Geffroy, historian (died 1895)
- Ernest de Jonquières, mathematician (died 1901)
- Léonard Morel-Ladeuil, goldsmith and sculptor (died 1888)
- Auguste Sallé, traveller and entomologist (died 1896)

== Deaths ==
=== January to June ===
- 9 January – Charles-Louis Clérisseau, architectural draughtsman, antiquary, and artist (born 1721)
- 21 January – Palisot de Beauvois, naturalist (born 1752)
- 15 February – Pierre-Joseph Cambon, statesman (born 1756)
- 26 March – Jean-Étienne Despréaux, ballet dancer, choreographer, composer, singer and playwright (born 1748)
- 25 April – Constantin-François Chassebœuf, philosopher, historian, orientalist, and politician (born 1757)
- 21 June – Alexis Thérèse Petit, physicist (born 1791)

=== July to December ===
- 14 September – François Joseph Lefebvre, Marshal of France (born 1755)
- 5 October – Augustin Barruel, Jesuit priest and writer (born 1741)
- 16 November – Jean-Lambert Tallien, political figure (born 1767)
- 7 December – Denis Decrès, naval officer and nobleman (born 1761)
- 25 December – Joseph Fouché, statesman and Minister (born 1763)
- 29 December – Jean Baptiste Antoine Auget de Montyon, philanthropist (born 1733)

=== Full date unknown ===
- Pierre Denys de Montfort, naturalist (born 1766)
- Jean-Baptiste Robinet, naturalist (born 1735)
- Jean Simeon Rousseau de la Rottiere, painter (born 1747)
