= Geffroy =

Geffroy is a French surname. Notable people with the surname include:

- Georges Geffroy (1903–1971), French interior designer
- Gustave Geffroy (1855–1926), French journalist, art critic and writer
- Isabelle Geffroy (born 1980), French singer-songwriter
- Mathieu Auguste Geffroy (1820–1895), French historian
