= 1916 in France =

- Decades: 1890s; 1900s; 1910s; 1920s; 1930s
- See also: History of France; Timeline of French history; List of years in France

Events from the year 1916 in France.

== Incumbents ==
- President: Raymond Poincaré
- President of the Council of Ministers: Aristide Briand

== Events ==
- 29 January – Paris is bombed by German zeppelins for the first time.
- 21 February – Battle of Verdun begins.
- 22 February – Battle of Bois des Caures ends.
- 27 April – Battle of Hulluch in World War I, 47th Brigade, 16th Irish Division decimated in one of the most heavily concentrated gas attacks of the war.
- 16 May – Britain and France conclude the secret Sykes-Picot Agreement to divide Arab areas of the Ottoman Empire following the conclusion of World War I into French and British spheres of influence.
- 1 July – First day on the Somme.
- 14 July – Battle of Bazentin Ridge, start of the second phase of the Battle of the Somme.
- 15 September – Battle of Flers-Courcelette begins and lasts for a week, third and last large-scale offensive by the British Army during the Battle of the Somme.
- 25 September – Battle of Morval.
- 26 September – Battle of Thiepval Ridge begins, German fortress of Thiepval is captured by the British.
- 28 September – Battle of Thiepval Ridge ends successfully, with the capture of the Schwaben Redoubt.
- 13 November – Battle of the Ancre launches, the final act of the Battle of the Somme.
- 18 November – Battle of the Somme ends.
- 18 December – Battle of Verdun ends.

== Births ==
=== January to June ===
- 11 January – Bernard Blier, actor (died 1989)
- 22 January – Henri Dutilleux, composer (died 2013)
- 14 February – Marcel Bigeard, military officer (died 2010)
- 16 February – Julien Darui, international soccer player (died 1987)
- 1 March – Lucienne Abraham, Trotskyist politician (died 1970)
- 20 March – Pierre Messmer, Gaullist politician and Prime Minister (died 2007)
- 4 April – Robert Charpentier, cyclist and Olympic gold medallist (died 1966)
- 9 April – Léonie Duquet, nun (killed by a death squad in Argentina 1977)
- 22 April – Yvette Lundy, resistance fighter (died 2019)
- 26 April – Paulette Coquatrix, costume designer (died 2018)
- 5 May – Andrée Clair, writer (died 1982)
- 6 May – Jacques-Laurent Bost, journalist (died 1990)
- 25 May – André Devigny, soldier and French Resistance member (died 1999)
- 30 May – Jacques Georges, soccer administrator (died 2004)
- 3 June – Denise Vernac, actress (died 1984)
- 10 June – André Mandouze, academic and journalist (died 2006)
- 16 June – Francis Cammaerts, Special Operations Executive (SOE) agent (died 2006)

=== July to December ===
- 19 July – François Mercier, footballer (died 1996)
- 22 July – Marcel Cerdan, boxer (died 1949)
- 24 August – Léo Ferré, poet, composer, singer and musician (died 1993)
- 21 September – Françoise Giroud, journalist, screenwriter, writer and politician (died 2003)
- 18 October – Jean-Yves Couliou, painter (died 1995)
- 19 October – Jean Dausset, immunologist, shares the Nobel Prize in Physiology or Medicine in 1980 (died 2009)
- 25 October – Thérèse Kleindienst, librarian (died 2018)
- 26 October – François Mitterrand, President of France from 1981 to 1995 (died 1996)
- 14 November – Roger Apéry, mathematician (died 1994)

== Deaths ==
- 17 January – Marie Bracquemond, Impressionist painter (born 1840)
- 22 February – Émile Driant, nationalist writer, politician and army officer (born 1855; killed in action)
- 3 March - Jean Mounet-Sully, actor (born 1841)
- 4 March – Franz Marc, German painter and printmaker (born 1880)
- 21 March – Léon Labbé, surgeon and politician (born 1832)
- 12 May – Frank Cheadle, Australian rugby league footballer and World War I soldier (born 1885)
- 19 May – Georges Boillot, motor racing driver and World War I fighter pilot (born 1884)
- 25 May – Jane Dieulafoy, archaeologist and novelist (born 1851)
- 29 June – Georges Lacombe, sculptor and painter (born 1868)
- 6 July – Odilon Redon, painter and printmaker (born 1840)
- 8 July – Augustin Cochin, historian (born 1876)
- 28 August – Henri Harpignies, painter (born 1819)
- 26 September – Max Ritter von Mulzer, World War I German flying ace (born 1893)
- 13 December – Antonin Mercié, sculptor and painter (born 1845)
- 14 December – Frédéric Febvre, actor (born 1835)

== See also ==
- List of French films of 1916
