= 1831 in France =

- Decades: 1810s; 1820s; 1830s; 1840s; 1850s
- See also: History of France; Timeline of French history; List of years in France

Events from the year 1831 in France.

== Incumbents ==
- Monarch – Louis Philippe I

== Events ==
- 10 March - The French Foreign Legion is founded.
- 5 July - 1831 French legislative election.
- 2 August - The Dutch Ten Days' Campaign against Belgium is halted by a French army.
- 22 November - In the first of the Canut Revolts, after a bloody battle with the military causing 600 casualties, rebellious silk workers seize Lyon.

== Arts and literature ==
- 16 March - Victor Hugo's historical romantic Gothic novel Notre-Dame de Paris, known in English as The Hunchback of Notre-Dame (completed on 15 January), is published by Gosselin in Paris.
- 19 March - The play La Cocarde Tricolore by the Cogniard brothers introduces the term "chauvinism".
- Frédéric Chopin arrives in Paris.

== Births ==
- 12 March - Joseph Gérard, Roman Catholic missionary priest (died 1914)
- 15 April - Eugène Poubelle, lawyer and diplomat who introduces the dustbin to Paris (died 1907)
- 7 July - Eugène Ketterer, composer and pianist (died 1870)
- 17 July - Amédée Mannheim, inventor of a slide rule (died 1906)
- 15 August - Pierre Petit, photographer (died 1909)
- 12 October - Ernest Boulanger, politician and economist (died 1907)
- 31 October - Paul Durand-Ruel, modern art dealer (died 1922)
- 23 December - Marie-Azélie Guérin-Martin, Roman Catholic lay religious, canonized (died 1877)

== Deaths ==
- 28 April - Charles César de Fay de La Tour-Maubourg, soldier and politician (born 1757)
- 12 May - Louis-Marie Aubert du Petit-Thouars, botanist (born 1758)
- 27 August - François Dumont, portrait miniature painter (born 1751)
- 14 October - Jean-Louis Pons, astronomer (born 1761)
