= List of French films of 1915 =

A list of films produced in France in 1915. Production was limited but included a number of war films.

Title	Director	Cast	Genre	Notes
Aimer, pleurer, mourir				Aimer, pleurer, mourir: synopsis.
L'Ambitieuse				
Amour sacré				
André Cornélis				
L'Angoisse au foyer				
Après 305 jours de guerre, le moral du soldat			War film	
L'Armée française après neuf mois de guerre			War film	
L'Artillerie française sur le front			War film	
L'Auréole de la gloire				
Autos-canons sur le front de bataille			War film	
Autour d'une bague				
Traquenard	Paul Garbagni	Irène Bordoni, Fernand Mailly	Crime	Short film

== See also ==
- 1915 in France
