= 1834 in France =

- Decades: 1810s; 1820s; 1830s; 1840s; 1850s
- See also: History of France; Timeline of French history; List of years in France

Events from the year 1834 in France.

== Incumbents ==
- Monarch – Louis Philippe I

== Events ==
- 26 February - Treaty of Desmichels signed between Abd-el-Kader and France, recognising him as the independent sovereign ruler of the province of Oran in Algeria.
- 21 June - Legislative election held for the third legislature of the July Monarchy.

== Births ==
- 1 January - Ludovic Halévy, author and playwright (died 1908).
- 9 April - Edmond Laguerre, mathematician (died 1886).
- 18 May - Auguste-Théodore-Paul de Broglie, professor of apologetics (died 1895).
- 19 July - Edgar Degas, artist (died 1917).
- 2 August - Frédéric Bartholdi, sculptor, designer of the Statue of Liberty (died 1904).
- 30 September - Louis Pierre Mouillard, engineer (died 1897).
- 16 December - Léon Walras, economist (died 1910).
- 28 December - Pierre Jean Marie Delavay, missionary, explorer and botanist (died 1895).

== Deaths ==
- 20 May - Gilbert du Motier, marquis de La Fayette, military officer and former aristocrat (born 1757).
- 14 July - Edmond-Charles Genêt, ambassador to the United States during the French Revolution (born 1763).
- 7 August - Joseph Marie Jacquard, silk weaver and inventor (born 1752).
- 8 October - François-Adrien Boieldieu, composer (born 1775).
