= 1826 in France =

- Decades: 1800s; 1810s; 1820s; 1830s; 1840s
- See also: History of France; Timeline of French history; List of years in France

Events from the year 1826 in France.

== Incumbents ==
- Monarch – Charles X
- Prime Minister – Joseph de Villèle

== Events ==
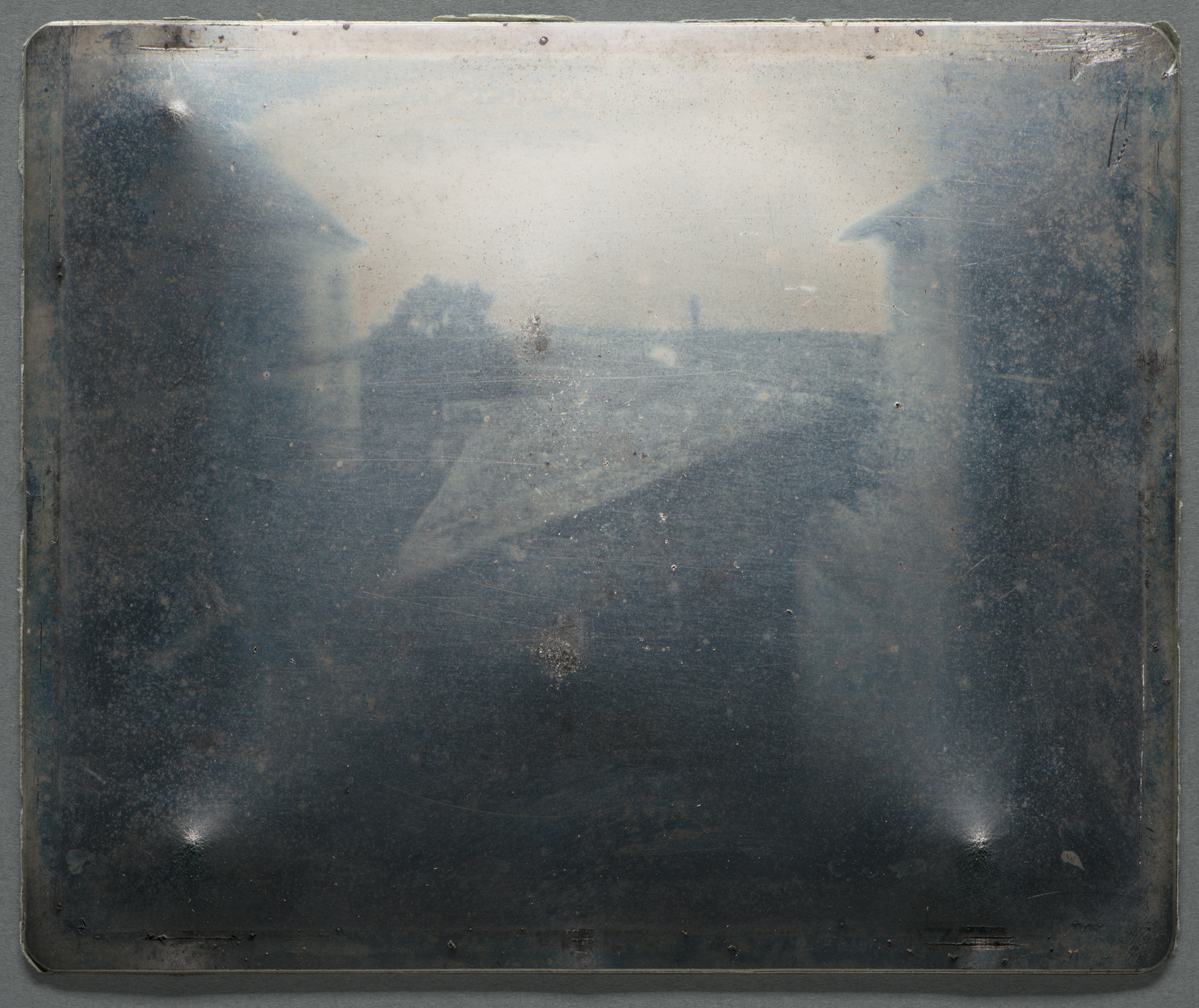
The oldest surviving photograph, Nicéphore Niépce, c. 1826

- 15 January - The newspaper Le Figaro begins publication in Paris, initially as a satirical weekly.
- June - Photography: Nicéphore Niépce makes a true photograph, View from the Window at Le Gras.
- 19 August - Louis Christophe François Hachette purchases the Brédif bookshop on rue Pierre-Sarrazin, Paris, origin of the Hachette publishing business.
- 3 November - The Paris Stock Exchange opens at the Palais de la Bourse.
- Unknown date - Société alsacienne de constructions mécaniques founded; becomes part of Alstom, global railway rolling stock manufacturer.

== Arts and literature ==
- The second novel by Victor Hugo, Bug-Jargal, is published.

== Births ==
- 6 April - Gustave Moreau, painter (died 1898)
- 5 May - Eugénie de Montijo, wife of Napoléon III (died 1920)
- 18 May - Emile-Justin Menier, pharmaceutical manufacturer, chocolatier and politician (died 1881)
- 29 June - Charles Ernest Beulé, archaeologist and politician (died 1874)
- 24 October - Léopold Victor Delisle, bibliophile and historian (died 1910)

=== Full date unknown ===
- Alphonse de Polignac, mathematician (died 1863)
- Louis-Arsène Delaunay, actor (died 1903)

== Deaths ==
- 3 January
  - Marie Le Masson Le Golft, naturalist (born 1750)
  - Louis Gabriel Suchet, Marshal of France (born 1770)
- 22 January - Henri-Cardin-Jean-Baptiste d'Aguesseau, politician (born 1746)
- 2 February - Jean Anthelme Brillat-Savarin, lawyer, politician, epicure and gastronome (born 1755)
- 1 July - Jean-Baptiste Stouf, sculptor (born 1742)
- 8 October - Marie-Guillemine Benoist, painter (born 1768)
- 5 November - Élie Halévy (Chalfan), Hebrew poet and author (born 1760)
