= 1829 in France =

- Decades: 1800s; 1810s; 1820s; 1830s; 1840s
- See also: History of France; Timeline of French history; List of years in France

Events from the year 1829 in France.

== Incumbents ==
- Monarch – Charles X
- Prime Minister – Jean Baptiste Gay (until 8 August), then Jules de Polignac

== Events ==
- 26 July – Red trousers (pantalon rouge) adopted as standard Army uniform.
- 17 November – Jules de Polignac becomes president of the council of ministers.
- Barthélemy Thimonnier invented the "sewing machine"

== Births ==
- 10 January – Henri-Émile Bazin, hydraulic engineer (d. 1917)
- 20 February – Charles-Auguste Lebourg, sculptor (d. 1906)
- 22 February – Henri-Jacques Espérandieu, architect (d. 1874)
- 18 July – Paul Dubois, sculptor (d. 1905)
- 25 November – Charles de Varigny, adventurer, diplomat, translator and writer (d. 1899)
- 21 December – Gabriel-Auguste Ancelet, architect (d. 1895)
- date unknown – Peter Howard, U.S. sailor (d. 1875)

== Deaths ==
- 18 March – Alexandre-Théodore-Victor, comte de Lameth, soldier and politician (b. 1760)
- 6 July – Pierre Dumanoir le Pelley, admiral (b. 1770)
- 23 August – Pierre Deval, diplomat (b. 1758)
- 5 September – Pierre, comte Daru, soldier, statesman, historian and poet (b. 1767)
- 13 December – Charles Dambray, chancellor of France (b. 1760)
