= List of French films of 1916 =

The following films were produced in France in 1916.

Title	Director	Cast	Genre	Notes
Abrégeons les formalités				
Accusée				
L'Affaire du Grand-Théâtre				
Aline ou la double vie				
Alsace	Henri Pouctal		Historical fiction	based on the 1913 play by Gaston Leroux
L' Ambition de Suzon				
Judex	Louis Feuillade	René Cresté	Adventure	

== See also ==
- 1916 in France
