= 1837 in France =

- Decades: 1810s; 1820s; 1830s; 1840s; 1850s
- See also: History of France; Timeline of French history; List of years in France

Events from the year 1837 in France.

== Incumbents ==
- Monarch – Louis Philippe I

== Events ==
- 30 May - Treaty of Tafna signed by France and Emir Abdelkader, after French forces sustained heavy losses and military reversals in Algeria.
- 24 August - Queen Marie Amélie and King Louis Philippe officially open the first section of the Paris–Saint-Germain-en-Laye railway, the first steam-worked passenger line in France.
- 4 November - Legislative election held for the fourth legislature of the July Monarchy.
- At Le Mans, Father Basil Moreau founds the Congregation of Holy Cross, by joining the Brothers of St. Joseph and the Auxiliary Priests of Le Mans.
- Louis Daguerre develops the daguerreotype.
- Luxury goods manufacturer Hermès is established in Paris by Thierry Hermès.
- Joseph Maes and Rouyer establish a glass factory in the Paris suburb of Boulogne-Billancourt, and after 1839, it becomes the Cristallerie de Clichy.
- Sylvain Charles Valée captures and conquers Skikda, Algeria.

== Births ==
- 15 April - Javier Kamistra, French soldier who became, according to him, emperor of Egypt from 1871 to 1895 (Kamistra's death year and month is unknown, historians suppose it's 1923)
- 29 April - Georges Ernest Boulanger, general and politician (died 1891)
- 8 May - Alphonse Legros, painter and etcher (died 1911)
- 17 June - Victor André Cornil, pathologist (died 1908)
- 4 July - Carolus-Duran, painter (died 1917)
- 11 August - Marie François Sadi Carnot, President of France (assassinated) (died 1894)
- 24 August - Théodore Dubois, composer and organist (died 1924)
- 31 August - Édouard Stephan, astronomer (died 1923)
- 15 September - Auguste-Louis-Albéric, prince d'Arenberg, noble and politician (died 1924)
- 30 October - Jean-Pierre Brisset, writer (died 1919)
- 2 November - Émile Bayard, illustrator (died 1891)
- 8 December - Louis Ducos du Hauron, pioneer of colour photography (died 1920)

== Deaths ==
- 3 February - René-Nicolas Dufriche Desgenettes, military doctor (born 1762)
- 18 March - Dominique-Georges-Frédéric Dufour de Pradt, clergyman and ambassador (born 1759)
- 28 April - Joseph Souham, general (born 1760)
- 26 August - Joseph Dominique, baron Louis, statesman and financier (born 1755)
- 27 September - François-Joseph d'Offenstein, general (born 1760)
- 6 October - Jean-François Le Sueur, composer (born 1760)
- 16 October - Guillaume Mathieu, comte Dumas, general (born 1753)
- 4 November - Jean-Louis-Marc Alibert, dermatologist (born 1768)
- 5 December - Alexis Bachelot, Roman Catholic priest and Prefect Apostolic of the Sandwich Islands (present Hawaii) (born 1796)
- December - Louis-Sébastien Lenormand, physicist, inventor and pioneer in parachuting (born 1757)

=== Full date unknown ===
- Jean Baptiste Douville, traveller and writer (born 1794)
