= 1812 in France =

- Decades: 1790s; 1800s; 1810s; 1820s; 1830s
- See also: History of France; Timeline of French history; List of years in France

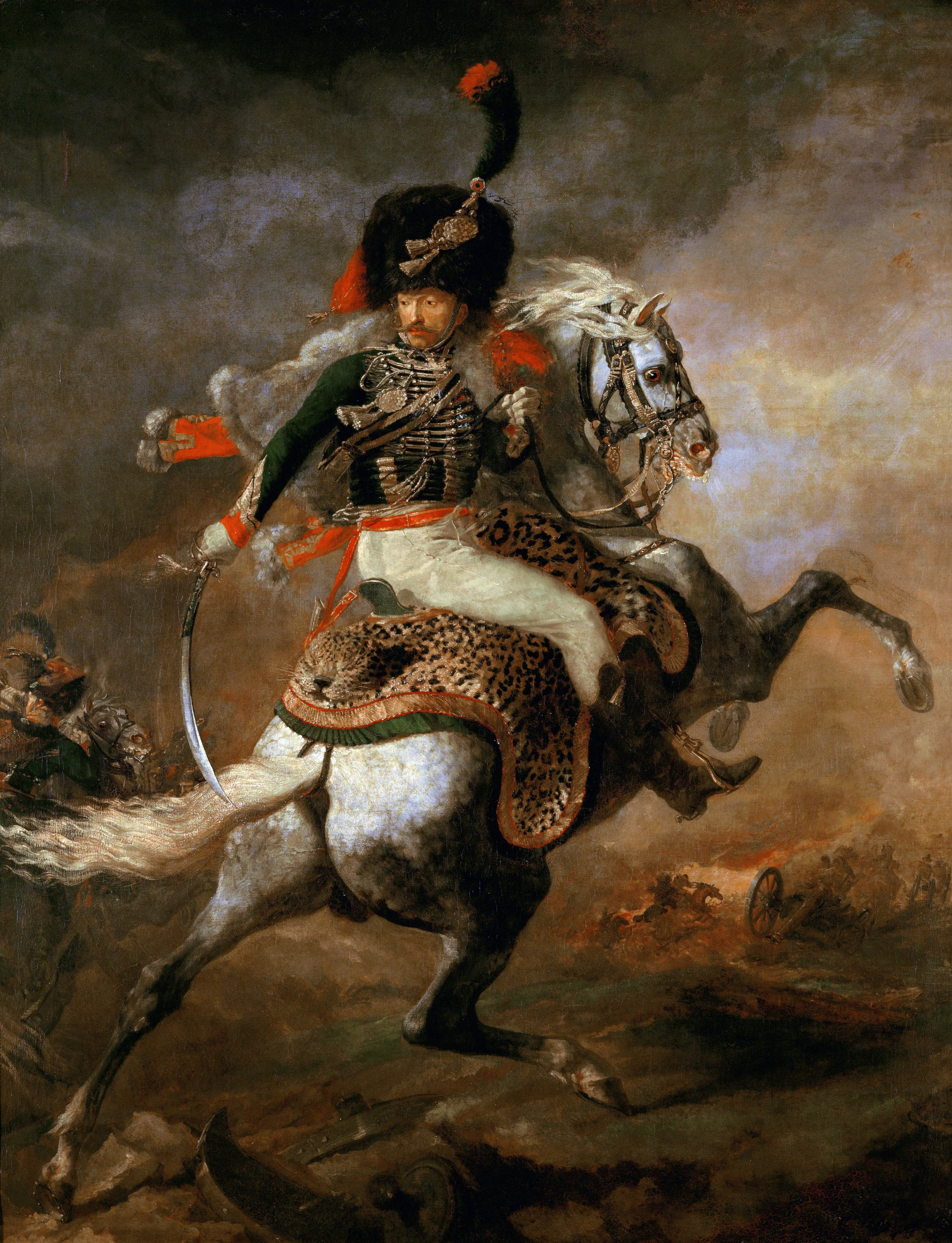
The Charging Chasseur, painted around 1812

Events from the year 1812 in France

== Incumbents ==
- Emperor – Napoleon I

== Events ==
- The Peninsular War (1807–1814)
- 12 February – Metric system rescinded for everyday use
- 24 June - 14 December – The French invasion of Russia

== Arts and culture ==
- The Charging Chasseur, painting by Théodore Géricault
- Fantasmagoriana, book by Jean-Baptiste Benoît Eyriès

== Births ==
- 4 January – Alexandre Monnet, bishop (died 1849)
- 15 April – Théodore Rousseau, painter (died 1867)
- 13 June – Adolphe Braun, photographer (died 1877)
- 9 November – Paul Abadie, architect (died 1884)
- 15 November – Adolphe Pierre Leleux, painter (died 1891)

== Deaths ==
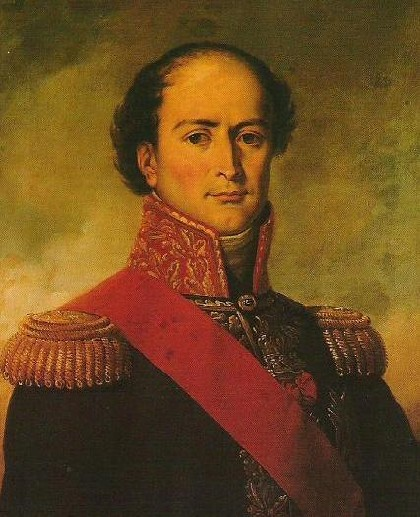
General Jean Baptiste Eblé participated in the French invasion of Russia in 1812.

- 13 February – Jacques Marie Boutet, actor and comic dramatist (born 1745)
- 24 February – Étienne-Louis Malus, military officer, engineer, physicist, and mathematician (born 1775)
- 24 July – Louis Thomas Villaret de Joyeuse, admiral (born 1747)
- 30 August – Gabriel-Marie Legouvé, poet (born 1764)
- 22 October – Alexis Joseph Delzons, general (born 1775)
- 29 October – Emmanuel Maximilien-Joseph Guidal, general (born 1764)
- 22 December – Pierre Henri Larcher, classical scholar and archaeologist (born 1726)

=== Exact date missing ===
- Jean Baptiste Eblé, general (born 1758)
