= Jean Neuberth =

French painter

Jean Neuberth (born November 1915 in Paris, died March 16, 1996, in Chantilly) was a French abstract painter.

== Biography ==
Neuberth's mother was a French teacher at Lycée Lakanal and a first-rate harpsichordist, his father was principal violist of the Concerts Colonne and a viola alta soloist, which explains his early orientation for music and jazz in particular. An encounter with abstract painter, Henri-Jean Closon (Liège 1888 - Paris 1975) made him discover painting. On seeing him again in 1941 he decided in 1942 to devote all his time to painting. During the 70's, he abandons gouache and centers his works on sketching and pasting. In spite of several health problems such as a hemiplegia, he never abandoned his artistic expression until his death in 1996.

He was qualified to be "one of the most active representative of abstract lyrics" by Pierre Carmes in 1993.

In 2002, from April 20 through May 20, a posthumous exhibit, which took place at Place Neuve Gallery at Vers-Pont-du-Gard, draws a retrospective of some of his works entitled Jean Neuberth - gouaches and drawings 1959-1992.

== His exhibits ==
- November 1937, L'Equipe Gallery
- 1946, "Salon des Surindépendants" (Independents Exhibit)
- 1946, Autumn Exhibit
- 1947, Lucienne Léonce Rosenberg Gallery, Gay-Lussac Street, Paris
- 1948, "Salon des Réalités Nouvelles" (New Realities Exhibit)
- October & November 1949, Paintings of Today", Beaux-Arts Museum of Nîmes
- 1951, 20-years of abstract painting, Montpellier
- May 1987, Exhibit at Caractères Gallery
- 1993, Exhibit at the Sculptures Gallery, Visconti Street in Paris,

featuring a retrospective of his works, "Parcours du Secret" (Secret Route)

== Works ==
=== Works illustrations ===
In the 1970s, he illustrated works for the Bibliophile Circle in Geneva, the Book Guild in Lausanne, or for the Sacred Music Encyclopedia (La Bergère, Paris), as well as for the international magazine of poetry, Caractères.

== Notes and references ==
- Dictionary of Abstract Painting by Michel Seuphor, 1957 edition

"... he resumes his studies with Closon in 1941...Devotes all his time to painting since 1942...His abstract compositions rise in many manners. Sometimes, it's an uninterrupted arabesque on the surface of the canvas lke the nostalgia of old evolutions in the sky.."

- Benezit Dictionary of Artists, 1976 Edition

" Having been acquainted with Closon, one of the first French abstract painters, he initiates him to painting. He participated, since 1937, to the rare abstract art exhibits organized in France. He devoted himself entirely to painting only after 1912. In 1949, with Francis Bott and Michel Seuphor, he organized an abstract art exhibit at the Nimes Museum. "

- Comments of art critics
