= Thérèse Kleindienst =

French librarian

- Born: 25 October 1916; Clamart, France
- Died: 3 July 2018 (aged 101); Saint-Gilles-Croix-de-Vie, France
- Education: École Nationale des Chartes
- Occupation: Librarian

Thérèse Kleindienst (25 October 1916 – 3 July 2018) was a French librarian. She was the secretary general of the Bibliothèque nationale de France from 1963 to 1984.

She became an officer of the Legion of Honour and the Ordre des Palmes Académiques in 1973, and an officer of the Ordre des Arts et des Lettres in 1976.

After her retirement as national librarian, she served as president of the society of alumni of the École Nationale des Chartes from 1984 to 1985.
