= Pierre Béarn =

- Born: Louis-Gabriel Besnard; 15 June 1902; Bucharest, Romania
- Died: 27 October 2004 (aged 102); Paris
- Known for: Poetry

Pierre Béarn (French: [beaʁn]; 15 June 1902 – 27 October 2004) was a French writer. He was born Louis-Gabriel Besnard in Bucharest, Romania.

He is known to Anglophones for his poem "Couleurs d'usine", which includes the line Métro, boulot, bistrots, mégots, dodo, zéro (translation: "Subway, work, bars, (cigarette) butts, sleep, nothing")

== Biography ==
Béarn was a multifaceted writer—working as a journalist, novelist, poet, fabulist, and humanist—who began composing texts at the age of nine in French slang, which he regarded as his "natural" language.

His father having died prematurely, at the age of 14 he became a mechanic to financially support his mother. This working life inspired the poem from which came one of the May 1968 protest slogans "métro-boulot-dodo" ("subway-work-sleep") that denounced the shocking workers' conditions at the time.

While commanding a trawler to aid the French evacuations in 1940, he was captured and was detained in the concentration camp at Aintree. His poems from that point onwards centred on the sea and the war.

After the war he took a post as a press attaché in Africa. In 1969, he created a quarterly magazine for himself alone: Le Lien (The Link). In 1975, he withdrew to Montlhéry where the peace allowed him to write many fables.

In 1998, the first volume of his complete works was published: L'arc en ciel de ma vie (The rainbow of my life). This was followed in 1999 by volume 2, 300 fables d'aujourd'hui (300 fables of today). The third volume, Couleurs charnelles (Carnal colours), was released just months before his death on October 27, 2004, during his 102nd year.

While generally ignored by the wider public, Béarn received a number of literary prizes such as the Prix de Verlaine (1940), the Grand Prix International de Poésie awarded by General Charles de Gaulle in 1971, the Grand prix de l'Académie française in 1981 and again in 1995 for his fables.

He also received the Médaille de la Résistance for his participation in the Liberation of Paris in 1944 and the Légion d'honneur in 1990 from François Mitterrand. He was also named Officer of the Ordre national du Mérite in 1995 by Jacques Chirac, and Commander of the Ordre des Arts et des Lettres in 2000 by the minister of culture, Catherine Tasca.

== Quotes ==
Au déboulé garçon pointe ton numéro
Pour gagner ainsi le salaire
D'un morne jour utilitaire
Métro, boulot, bistro, mégots, dodo, zéro

— Pierre Béarn, Couleurs d'usine

== Bibliography ==
- D'amour et d'eau claire (1983)
- La bete (1989)
- L'erotisme dans la poesie feminine de langue francaise: Des origines a nos jours (1993)
- Metro, boulot, dodo: Entretiens avec Christian Denis (La poesie voila) (1996)
