= French colonial law =

French colonial law and its characteristics

French Colonial Law
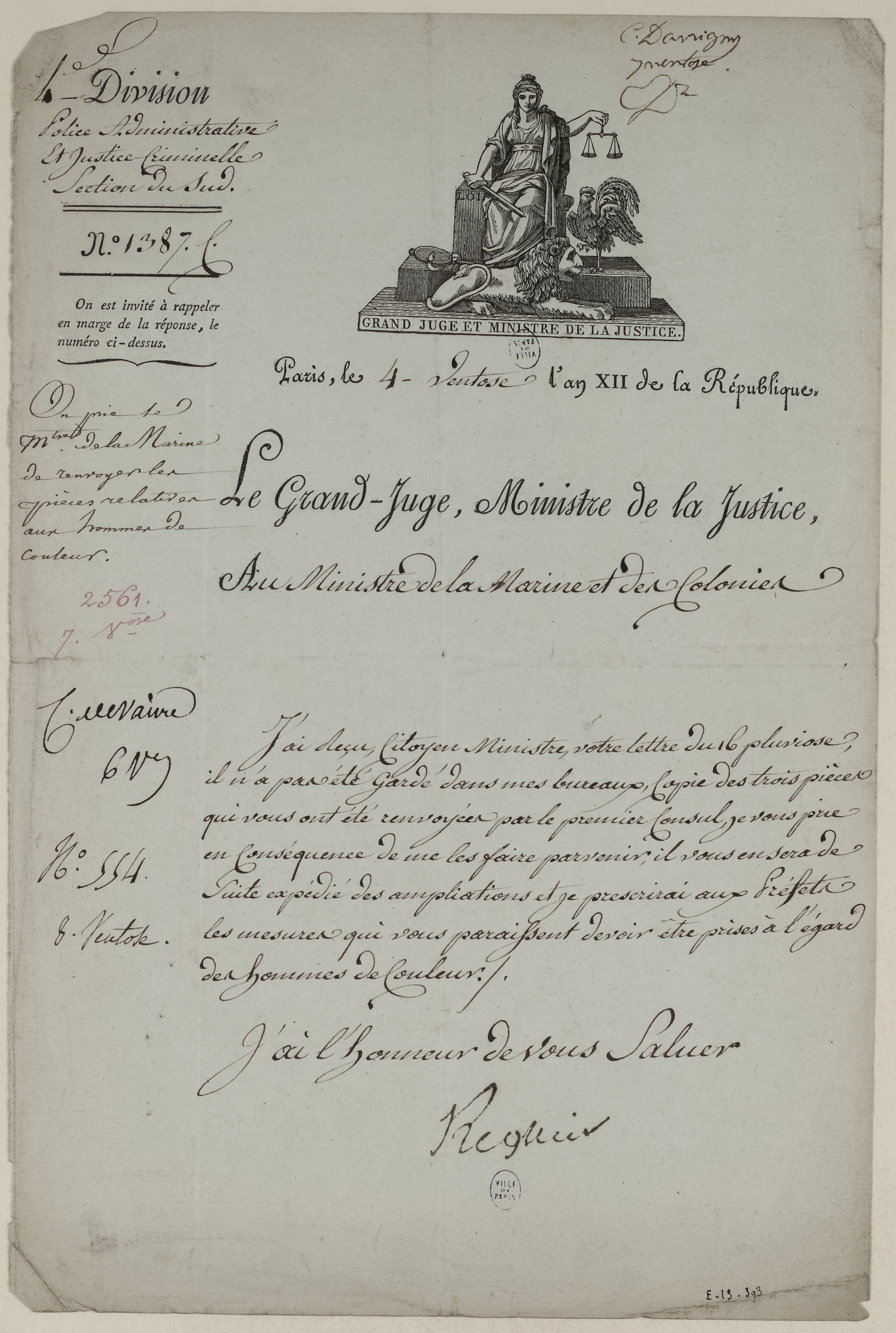
- Letter from the Minister of Justice to the Minister of the Navy and Colonies concerning documents on "men of color" (hommes de couleur)

French colonial law refers to the segment of French law historically practiced within the French colonial empire. This colonial law was designed under the premise of a "civilizing mission," but in practice, it often entailed discriminatory treatment of colonized populations. Key institutions included the French colonial native code (French: indigénat) and legal slavery. French colonial law frequently aimed to manage colonized peoples through an understanding of their social structures, often referred to as "customs." Specialists in French colonial law included administrators, jurists, and magistrates.

== History ==
Overall, French colonization occurred through more military than legal means. Most colonies were annexed unilaterally under the right of conquest, with only exceptional cases formalized through bilateral treaties, such as the French Protectorate of Tunisia.

== Ideology ==
In French colonial ideology, the French Empire was seen as a continuation of and surpassing Ancient Rome, and as a model of legal rectitude. The French claimed to add progress and social justice to this heritage.

Colonial legal and political thought revealed a paradoxical relationship between colonial and national legislation. According to the Declaration of the Rights of Man and of the Citizen of 1789, laws passed by the National Assembly were meant to apply universally within France and its dependencies, regarded as part of French territory. Despite this principle, a distinction arose between imperial and national domains, creating hybrid legal configurations based on political and jurisdictional circumstances. This tension between Republican universalism and the exclusion of colonies at the periphery spurred critiques of the inconsistencies in colonial law.

== Institutions ==
French colonial law focused on commerce, differentiated citizenship, forced labor, and administrative land management. Judicial and police systems were adapted for colonial contexts.

=== Commerce ===
==== Exclusive trade regime ====
Until the eve of the French Revolution, French colonial trade was primarily governed by an exclusive trade regime, also known as the principe de l'Exclusif. This system applied stringent regulations on shipping, with colonies obliged to export raw materials to Metropolitan France and only able to import high priced French goods, ensuring that the economic benefits of colonial production flowed back to France.

The trade restrictions often led to widespread smuggling as colonists sought better prices and access to goods from other European powers. The liberalisation of the French economy in the run up to the French Revolution dismantled much of the system, although Napoleon did consider reinstating it when he came to power in 1799.

=== Citizenship tiers ===
French colonial law established various citizenship configurations for colonial residents, granting differing levels of rights depending on social categories. Emmanuelle Saada noted that the French state sought to curtail acknowledgment of paternity of multiracial children (French: métis) by French fathers, often labeling these claims as fraudulent.

==== Native code ====
The French colonial native code (French: Code de l'indigénat) was a diverse and fluctuating set of arbitrary laws and regulations which created in practice an inferior legal status for natives of French colonies from 1881 until 1944–1947. (Note: The native code was promulgated by the French government for Algeria on 28 June 1881. It was officially abolished during 1946, but parts of it remained in force until independence during the early 1960s. The senatus consulte of 14 July 1865 implemented many of the elements of the future Code d'Indigénat in Algeria, and prior to 1887, other colonial subjects lived under similar conditions.)

The native code was introduced by decree, in various forms and degrees of severity, to Algeria and Cochinchina in 1881, New Caledonia and Senegal in 1887, Annam-Tonkin and Polynesia in 1897, Cambodia in 1898, Mayotte and Madagascar in 1901, French West Africa in 1904, French Equatorial Africa in 1910, French Somaliland in 1912, and the Mandates of Togo and Cameroon in 1923 and 1924.

The native code also encompassed other oppressive measures that were applied to the native population of the French empire, such as forced labor, requisitions, capitation (head tax), etc.

== Justice ==
The justice system in French colonies was adapted to serve the interests of the colonial administration, often at the expense of the colonized populations. While colonial officials claimed to implement a fair legal system, in practice, colonial justice was frequently characterized by inequalities, expedited procedures, and the denial of rights afforded to French citizens in mainland France.

=== Native tribunals ===
The colonial administration established native tribunals to adjudicate disputes among local populations. These courts were often presided over by French magistrates or colonial administrators who applied a hybrid of local customs and colonial legal codes. While they claimed to respect indigenous legal traditions, these tribunals often distorted local norms to align with colonial objectives.

=== Penal practices ===
Colonial justice systems frequently employed harsh and discriminatory penal practices. One notable example was the native code, which allowed for collective punishment and extrajudicial measures against indigenous populations, including forced labor, fines, and corporal punishment. The system often lacked transparency, and appeals to higher courts were rare or inaccessible to indigenous defendants.

=== Role of magistrates ===
Magistrates in the colonies were primarily French nationals who frequently spent their entire careers in colonial territories. Their dual roles as judges and administrative officials created a conflict of interest, as they often prioritized the goals of the colonial administration over impartial justice.

=== Simplified legal proceedings ===
In many colonies, the justice system operated with simplified procedures, particularly for indigenous defendants. Courts often prioritized swift verdicts over due process, resulting in widespread dissatisfaction and criticism from both local populations and human rights advocates.

The disparities in the administration of justice contributed to the broader perception of colonial law as an instrument of control rather than equity. These practices have left a lasting legacy on postcolonial legal systems, with many former colonies retaining elements of the colonial judicial framework.

== Legacy ==
=== Postcolonial states ===
Many postcolonial nations retained significant elements of French colonial legal institutions after gaining independence.

=== French overseas territories ===
In France's overseas territories, colonial law evolved to reflect both the integration of these territories into the French Republic and their unique legal needs. The departmentalization of many former colonies in 1946 aimed to extend French laws uniformly to overseas territories, aligning them more closely with the legal framework of mainland France. However, certain adaptations were maintained to address specific local contexts, creating a hybrid legal structure.

Over time, the legal systems in these territories incorporated both metropolitan legal principles and customary local laws, particularly in areas such as family law and property rights. This dual approach allowed for the coexistence of modern legal systems and traditional practices while maintaining the overarching authority of the French Republic.
