= Napoléon Peyrat =

French author and historian

Napoléon Peyrat (20 January 1809 – 4 April 1881) was a French writer and historian from Les Bordes-sur-Arize (French: Les Bordes-sur-Arize).

Preyat was an anti-monarchist who was also opposed to the Catholic Church. Peyrat was the author of Histoire des pasteurs du Désert: depuis la révocation de l'édit de Nantes jusqu'à la Révolution française, 1685 - 1789 (History of the Desert Fathers: from the revolution of the Edict of Nantes to the French Revolution, 1685-1789). Published in 1842, English translation 1852. It is a notable history of the Revolt of the Camisards. Peyrat also wrote the two volume Histoire des Albigeois: les Albigeois et l'Inquisition (1872) (History of the Albigensians: the Albigensians and the Inquisition) a history of Catharism. Peyrat's book depicts the Cathars as the forerunners of the values of Protestantism and French Republicanism.
