= Jean Joseph Antoine de Courvoisier =

French magistrate and politician

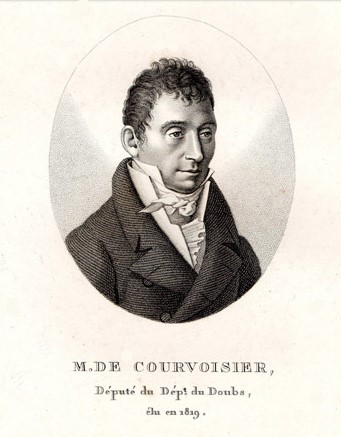
- Born: 30 November 1775; Besançon
- Died: 18 September 1835 (aged 59)
- Occupations: magistrate and politician

Jean Joseph Antoine de Couvoisier (30 November 1775 – 18 September 1835) was a French magistrate and politician.

== Early life ==
Couvoisier was born at Besançon on 30 November 1775. During the revolutionary period, he left the country and served in the army of the émigrés and later in that of Austria.

== Career ==
In 1801, under the consulate, he returned to France and established himself as an advocate at Besançon, being appointed conseiller-auditeur to the court of appeal therein 1808. At the Restoration he was made advocate-general by Louis XVIII, resigned and left France during the Hundred Days, and was reappointed after the second Restoration in 1815.

In 1817, after the modification of the constitution by the ordonnance of the 5 September, he was returned to the chamber of deputies, where he attached himself to the left centre and supported the moderate policy of Richelieu and Decazes. He was an eloquent speaker, and master of many subjects; and his proved royalism made it impossible for the Ultra-Royalists to discredit him, much as they resented his consistent opposition to their short-sighted violence.

After the revolt at Lyon, he was nominated procureur-general of the city, and by his sense and moderation did much to restore order and confidence. He was again a member of the chamber from 1819 to 1824, and vigorously opposed the exceptional legislation which the second administration of Richelieu passed under the influence of the ultra-Royalists.

In 1824, he failed to secure re-election, and occupied himself with his judicial duties until his nomination as councilor of state in 1827. On 8 August 1829, he accepted the offer of the portfolio of justice in the Polignac ministry, but resigned on 19 May 1830, when he realized that the government intended to abrogate the Charter and the inevitable revolution that would follow. During the trial of the ex-ministers, in December, he was summoned as a witness, and paid a tribute to the character of his former colleagues which, in the circumstances, argued no little courage. He refused to take office under Louis Philippe I, and retired into private life, dying on 18 September 1835.
