= Louise Laffon =

French photographer and painter

Louise Laffon (1828–1885), was a French photographer and painter. She was one of the first female professional photographers in France. She had a studio in Paris between 1859 and 1876.
