= Jean-Baptiste Joseph Émile Montégut =

- Born: June 14, 1825; Limoges, France
- Died: December 11, 1895 (aged 70); Paris, France
- Occupations: Literary critic, translator
- Employer: Revue des deux mondes
- Known for: Literary criticism; French translations of works by Ralph Waldo Emerson, Thomas Babington Macaulay, and William Shakespeare

Jean-Baptiste Joseph Émile Montégut (14 June 1825 – 11 December 1895) was a French critic.

He was born at Limoges. He began to write for the Revue des deux mondes in 1847, contributing between 1851 and 1857 a series of articles on the English and American novel, and in 1857 he became chief literary critic of the review. Émile Montégut translated Essais de philosophie américaine (1850) from Ralph Waldo Emerson; Revolution de 1688 (2 vols. 1853) from Thomas Macaulay's History; and also produced the Œuvres completes (10 vols. 1868-1873) of William Shakespeare.

Among his numerous critical works are Poètes et artistes de l'Italie (1881), Types littéraires et fantaisies esthétiques (1882), Ecrivains modernes d'Angleterre (3rd series, 1885-1892) and Heures de lecture d'un critique (1891) and studies of John Aubrey, Alexander Pope, Wilkie Collins and Sir John Mandeville.

Montégut died at Paris.
