= Jean-Baptiste Robinet =

- Born: 23 June 1735; Rennes, France
- Died: 24 March 1820 (aged 84); Rennes, France
- Other name: Jean-Baptiste-René Robinet
- Known for: Origins of evolutionary thought
- Scientific career
- Fields: Naturalist, Encyclopaedist, Translator

Jean-Baptiste Robinet (French: [ʁɔbinɛ]; 23 June 1735 – 24 March 1820), also known as Jean-Baptiste-René Robinet, was a French naturalist, known for his five-volume work De la nature (1761–68). He was also involved in the sequel publications to the Encyclopédie, took on Diderot's editorial role, and was a translator of numerous works to the French language.

== Life ==
Robinet was born in Rennes on 23 June 1735, and died there on 24 March 1820. Early in life he was educated by the Jesuits and embraced the rule of St. Ignatius, but soon regretted his loss of freedom and entered the world of letters. He traveled to Holland to publish his book De la nature which in time gained notoriety due to the peculiar opinions presented in the book. Upon his return to Paris in 1778 he was appointed royal censor and private secretary to Antoine-Jean Amelot de Chaillou. During the French Revolution he lost all employment and retired to his home, where he lived in relative seclusion, occupied only with family duties. He had been a disciple of encyclopédistes, but was also committed to the principles of the church. He eventually returned to the church and signed a recantation of his errors.

== Work ==
Robinet is one of the many precursors in the history of evolutionary thought who contributed to the process which later crystallized in the work of Charles Darwin. Jean-Baptiste was led from observations into the idea of the transmutation of species and so into a theory of evolution, which in some important respects anticipated modern ideas. In De la nature, published in 1761, Nature was not God, but necessarily and eternally evolved from Divine essence. Creation is the everlasting work of the Deity, who from eternity has been working and smoothly progressing in the manner of Nature. There are no leaps. All things must have come from unity, which has been infinitely diversified. Kingdoms, classes and species are artificial works of man, of which Nature knows nothing. The orangutan was next to man in the scale of being. All the links of Nature's chain may not yet have been discovered, but they would be discovered before long.

Robinet represented a teleological point of view in his discussions on evolution. All was produced from a divine, pre-existing, and static master-plan. He wrote that in diverse lower animals, Nature advances, groping towards the excellence of the human being. Some imperceptible progress is made at each step, each new production a variation of the primitive design, becoming very responsive after a number of metamorphoses. The development of the human machine had taken a long succession of arrangements, compositions and dissolutions, additions and deletions, alterations, cancellations, and changes of all kinds.

Robinet, in collaboration with Charles-Joseph Panckoucke were exponents of the Encyclopédie, and published a supplement to it in four volumes (1776-1777). He also participated in the publication of one of the first works of its kind, the thirty volume social science dictionary Dictionnaire universel des sciences morales, économique, politique et diplomatique; ou bibliothèque de l’homme d’État et du citoyen (1777–83) created as a "library of statesmen and citizens”. Robinet also published numerous translations into French, in particular, works by David Hume and Johann Joachim Winckelmann. He was probably the translator of Hume's Essays Moral and Political and drew heavily upon it in his Considerations sur l'état présent de la littérature en Europe.
