= 1902 in France =

- Decades: 1880s; 1890s; 1900s; 1910s; 1920s
- See also: History of France; Timeline of French history; List of years in France

Events from the year 1902 in France.

== Incumbents ==
- President: Émile Loubet
- President of the Council of Ministers: Pierre Waldeck-Rousseau (until 3 June), Emile Combes (starting 7 June)

== Events ==
- January - Alfred Loisy writes L'évangile et l'Eglise, which inaugurates the crisis of modernism in the Catholic Church.
- 13 April – A new land speed record of 119 km/h (74 mph) is set in Nice by Leon Serpollet driving a steam car.
- 27 April – Legislative Election held.
- 8 May – 1902 eruption of Mount Pelée on Martinique.
- 11 May – Legislative Election held.
- 24 August – A statue of Joan of Arc is unveiled in Saint-Pierre-le-Moûtier, the town which she stormed in 1429.
- 1 September – The first science fiction film, the trick film A Trip to the Moon (Le Voyage dans La Lune), is premièred at the Théâtre Robert-Houdin in Paris by actor/producer Georges Méliès, and proves an immediate success.
- 5 October – Thousands attend the funeral of the novelist Émile Zola at the Cimetière de Montmartre, Paris. They include Alfred Dreyfus, given special permission by Mme Zola to attend.
- The capital of French Indochina is moved from Saigon (in Cochinchina) to Hanoi (Tonkin).
- Claude Monet begins his Water Lilies series of paintings in his garden at Giverny.

== Literature ==
- André Gide - L'Immoraliste
- Jules Verne - Les Frères Kip

== Music ==
- Claude Debussy - Pelléas et Mélisande
- Jules Massenet - Le jongleur de Notre-Dame
- Maurice Ravel - Jeux d'eau
- Camille Saint-Saëns - Cello Concerto No. 2
- Erik Satie
  - Poudre d'or
  - Tendrement

== Births ==
=== January–June ===
- 11 January – Maurice Duruflé, composer and organist (died 1986)
- 13 January – Raymond Ruyer, philosopher (died 1987)
- 18 January – Émile Aillaud, architect (died 1988)
- 21 January – Agnès Souret, model, "la plus belle femme de France" (died 1928)
- 25 January – André Beaufre, colonel (died 1975)
- 29 January – Arlette Marchal, actress (died 1984)
- 8 February – André Gillois, writer and radio pioneer (died 2004)
- 26 February – Jean Bruller, writer and illustrator (died 1991)
- 9 March – Elisabeth de Rothschild, World War II heroine (died 1945)
- 13 March – Louis Ducatel, politician and businessman (died 1999)
- 14 March – Henri Barbé, communist (died 1966)
- 16 March – Louis Couffignal, mathematician and cybernetics pioneer (died 1966)
- 22 March – Madeleine Milhaud, actress (died 2008)
- 29 March – Marcel Aymé, novelist and children's writer (died 1967)
- 4 April – Louise Leveque de Vilmorin, novelist, poet and journalist (died 1969)
- 9 April – Théodore Monod, naturalist, explorer and humanist scholar (died 2000)
- 3 May – Alfred Kastler, physicist, Nobel Prize laureate (died 1984)
- 7 May – Jean-Philippe Lauer, architect and Egyptologist (died 2001)
- 8 May – André Michel Lwoff, microbiologist, awarded Nobel Prize in Medicine in 1965 (died 1994)
- 27 May – Émile Benveniste, structural linguist (died 1976)
- 2 June – Georges Coudray, politician (died 1998)
- 15 June – Pierre Béarn, writer (died 2004)
- 28 June – Pierre Brunet, figure skater (died 1991)

=== July–December ===
- 6 July – Louis Vola, double bass player (died 1990)
- 16 July – Vincent Badie, lawyer and politician (died 1989)
- 21 July – Georges Wambst, Olympic cyclist (died 1988)
- 9 August – Zino Francescatti, violinist (died 1991)
- 11 August – Christian de Castries, military officer (died 1991)
- 16 August – Gilbert Gérintès, rugby union player (died 1968)
- 24 August – Fernand Braudel, historian (died 1985)
- 28 August – Jean Favard, mathematician (died 1965)
- 15 October – André Prudhommeaux, anarchist bookstore owner (died 1968)
- 20 October – René Floriot, lawyer (died 1975).
- 31 October – Marie-Laure de Noailles, patron of the arts (died 1970)
- 4 November – Pierre Edouard Leopold Verger, photographer and ethnographer (died 1996)
- 16 November – Paul Bontemps, athlete and Olympic medallist (died 1981)
- 20 November – Jean Painlevé, film director (died 1989)
- 25 December – Maurice Gallay, footballer (died 1982)
- 31 December – Marcel Bidot, cyclist (died 1995)

=== Full date unknown ===
- Jules Semler-Collery, composer, conductor and teacher (died 1988)

== Deaths ==
- 26 January- Noël Ballay, explorer, colonial administrator and poet (born 1847])
- 6 February – Clémence Royer, scholar (born 1830)
- 17 February – Marie-Louise Gagneur, feminist (born 1832)
- 12 April – Marie Alfred Cornu, physicist (born 1841)
- 15 April – Jules Dalou, sculptor (born 1838)
- 4 July – Hervé Faye, astronomer (born 1814)
- 8 August – James Tissot, painter (born 1836)
- 29 September – Émile Zola, writer (born 1840)
- 7 December – Pierre Paul Dehérain, chemist and botanist (born 1830)
- Full date unknown – Alexandre Bertrand, archaeologist (born 1820)

== See also ==
- List of French films before 1910
