= Alexis André =

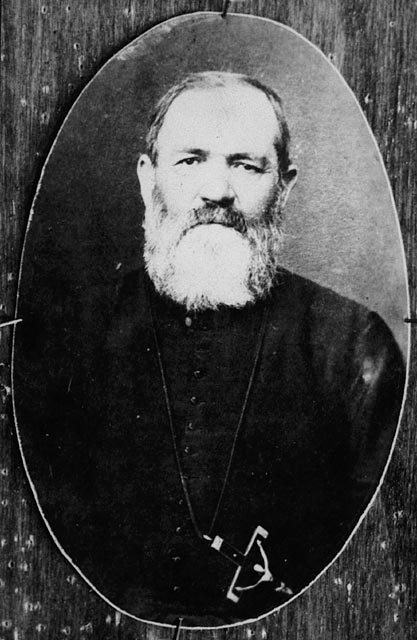
- Fr. Alexis André, 1885
- Born: July 6, 1832; Kergompez, Saint-Pol-de-Léon, France
- Died: January 10, 1893 (aged 60); Calgary, Northwest Territories
- Known for: Missionary

Father Alexis André (6 July 1832 – 10 January 1893) was a missionary Roman Catholic priest active in Western Canada.

André was born in Kergompez, Saint-Pol-de-Léon, France. He was ordained a priest on July 14, 1861, and was immediately sent as a missionary to the Red River Colony and the Dakota Territory. He spent much time in service to people in Manitoba and the North-West Territories (now Saskatchewan and Alberta), especially to the Métis population. He served the first mass in Prince Albert.

As a result of Fr. André's close association with the Métis, he was assigned as Louis Riel's spiritual advisor prior to his execution in 1885.

In 1887 André was appointed to the Calgary mission. He died in Calgary on January 10, 1893.
