= 1769 in France =

- Decades: 1740s; 1750s; 1760s; 1770s; 1780s
- See also: History of France; Timeline of French history; List of years in France

Events from the year 1769 in France.

== Incumbents ==
- Monarch: Louis XV

== Events ==
- 16 March – Louis Antoine de Bougainville returns to Saint-Malo, following a three-year circumnavigation of the world with the ships Boudeuse and Étoile, with the loss of only seven out of 330 men; among the members of the expedition is Jeanne Baré, the first woman known to have circumnavigated the globe (she returns to France some time after Bougainville and his ships).
- 8 May – Battle of Ponte Novu begins between royal French forces and the native Corsicans.
- 9 May – Battle of Ponte Novu ends, marking the end of the Corsican War and paving the way for French dominance over the island.
- 23 October – Nicolas-Joseph Cugnot demonstrates a steam-powered artillery tractor (or 'automobile').

== Culture ==
- The Concert des Amateurs is founded by François-Joseph Gossec in Paris at the Hôtel de Soubise.

== Births ==
=== January to June ===
- 1 January – Marie-Louise Lachapelle, midwife (died 1821)
- 10 January – Michel Ney, Marshal of France (died 1815)
- 31 January – André-Jacques Garnerin, inventor of the frameless parachute (died 1823)
- 1 March – François Séverin Marceau-Desgraviers, general (died 1796)
- 9 March – Adélaïde Binart, neoclassical painter (died 1832)
- 29 March – Jean-de-Dieu Soult, Marshal General of France and three times Prime Minister of France (died 1851)
- 10 April – Jean Lannes, general (mortally wounded in battle) (died 1809)
- 13 April – Charles Mathieu Isidore Decaen, general (died 1832)
- 21 April – Alexandre-Antoine Hureau de Sénarmont, artillery general (died 1810)
- 25 April – Marc Isambard Brunel, engineer (died 1849 in the United Kingdom)

=== July to December ===
- 29 July – Louis-Benoît Picard, playwright (died 1828)
- 15 August – Napoleon Bonaparte, military and political leader (died 1821 in Saint Helena)
- 23 August – Georges Cuvier, naturalist and zoologist (died 1832)
- 10 October – Augustin Alexandre Darthé, Revolutionary (executed 1797)
- 28 December – Auguste Hilarion, comte de Kératry, poet, novelist, historian and politician (died 1859)

=== Full date unknown ===
- Barthelemy Lafon, Louisiana Creole architect, engineer, city planner, surveyor and smuggler (died 1820 in the United States)

== Deaths ==
- 5 April – Marc-Antoine Laugier, Jesuit priest and architectural theorist (born 1713)
- 1 August – Jean-Baptiste Chappe d'Auteroche, astronomer (born 1722)
- 23 September – Michel Ferdinand d'Albert d'Ailly, astronomer (born 1714)
- 3 November – Diane Adélaïde de Mailly, third of the five de Nesle sisters (born 1713)
