= French Expedition to Ancona =

French military expedition

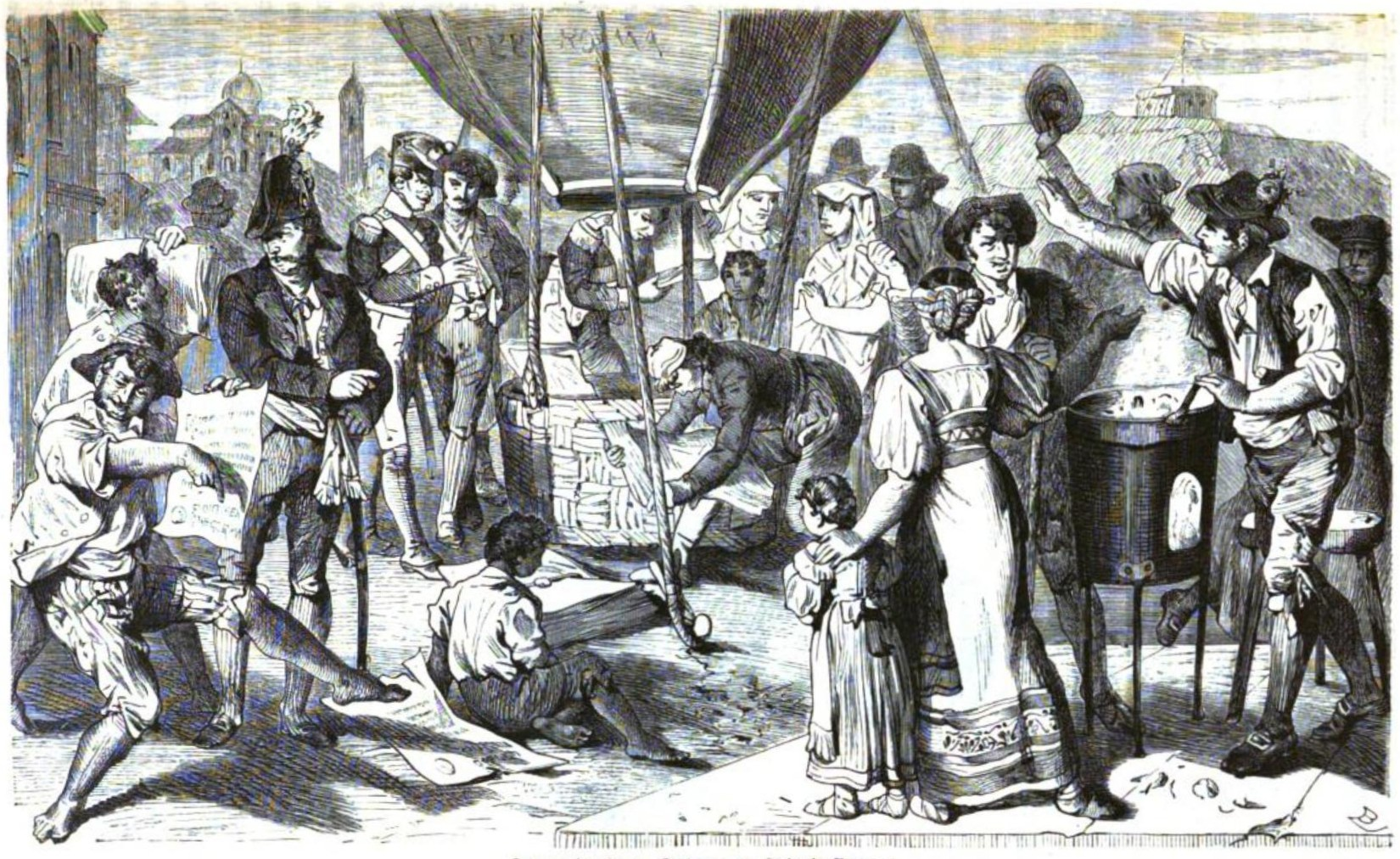
Illustration of a scene from the French occupation by Ludwig Burger

The French Expedition to Ancona in 1832 was an armed intervention by forces of France in the Italian coastal city of Ancona in the Papal States. Ordered by the government of Casimir Pierre Périer, the city was under French control by 22 February 1832. The force was dispatched to counter an Austrian occupation of Bologna to the north. An Italian nationalist uprising in 1831 had been repressed by Papal forces and Austria, firmly opposed to Italian Unification, ruled the large territory of Lombardy–Venetia in Northern Italy.

French forces had previously captured Ancona in 1797 during the French Revolutionary Wars and in 1808 it had been incorporated into the Napoleonic Kingdom of Italy, before being returned to the Pope's control by the Congress of Vienna in 1815.

The French Occupation of Ancona by Horace Vernet, 1840

The Austrian Foreign Minister Klemens von Metternich advised Pope Gregory XVI not to respond to the occupation for fear of provoking a general European war. The British Foreign Secretary Lord Palmerston had been broadly supportive of the French operation, but public opinion was much more critical.

French forces remained in Ancona until 1838, when they withdrew by mutual agreement with the Austrians who also evacuated Bologna. This was one of eight wars or military interventions made in Europe by France after the end of the Napoleonic Wars.

In 1844 during his unexpected visit to London, the Russian Russian Emperor Nicholas I used the Ancona expedition as an example of why Britain should not trust France and would be better off with an Anglo-Russian alliance.

== Bibliography ==
- Figes, Orlando. Crimea: The Last Crusade. Allen Lane, 2010.
- O'Malley, John W. & Levillain, Philippe (ed.) The Papacy: An Encyclopedia · Volume 1. Routledge 2002.
- Vyčichlo, Jiří. Palmerston and Metternich’s Austria, 1830‒1841: Clash of Ideas in the Balance of Power. De Gruyter, 2025.
