= Jules Semler-Collery =

French composer, conductor and teacher

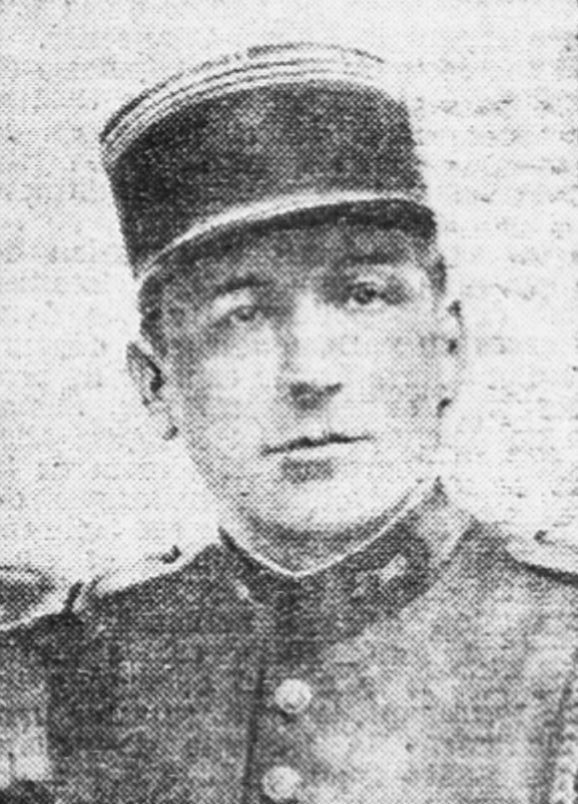
Jules Semler-Collery

Jules Semler-Collery (1902 - 1988) was a French composer, conductor and teacher.

== Life ==
Jules Semler-Collery was born in Dunkerque in 1902. His father, a conductor, was his first music teacher. Later he studied at the Paris Conservatoire, where he won several prizes, and also at the Schola Cantorum. He then studied with Vincent d'Indy and Paul Vidal.

He became well known as a conductor and composer. His compositions include several symphonic works and concertos for different instruments. Some of the concertos are included on the list of compulsory works at the Paris Conservatoire National Superieur, where Semler-Collery was often president of the jury. From 1969 he was President of the Confédération Musicale de France. He died in 1988.

== Publications in Print ==
- Habanera Piano Solo (publisher Eschig)
- Prelude Piano Solo (publisher Eschig)
- Introduction et Saltarelle Flute and Piano (publisher Eschig)
- Pastorale et Caprice Flute and Piano (publisher Alphonse Leduc)
- Cantilène et petit Divertissement Oboe and Piano (publisher Eschig)
- Etudes de Concert Clarinet Solo (publisher Eschig)
- Petites Etudes Recreatives Clarinet Solo (publisher Eschig)
- Lied et Final Clarinet and Piano (publisher Eschig)
- Fantaisie et Danse en Forme de Gigue Clarinet and Piano (publisher Alphonse Leduc)
- Reverie et Scherzo Clarinet and Piano (publisher Alphonse Leduc)
- Melodie expressive Clarinet and Piano (publisher Eschig)
- Pièce de Caractère for two clarinets (publisher Billaudot)
- Terzetto for three clarinets (in Bb) (publisher Eschig)
- Quartetto for four clarinets (in Bb) (publisher Eschig)
- Piece Recreative for five clarinets (in Bb) (publisher Eschig)
- Récitatif et Final Bassoon and Piano (publisher Eschig)
- Etudes concertantes Saxophone solo (with piano ad lib.) (publisher Eschig)
- Barcarolle et Danse Alto Saxophone and Piano (publisher Eschig)
- Fantaisie-Caprice Alto Saxophone and Piano (publisher Eschig)
- Melodie Expressive Alto (or Tenor) Saxophone and Piano (publisher Eschig)
- Reverie for four saxophones (SATB) (publisher Eschig)
- Etudes melodiques Trumpet solo (publisher Eschig)
- Nocturne et Rondo (Cornet) Trumpet and Piano (publisher Eschig)
- Evocation et Scherzetto (Trumpet in C) Trumpet and Piano (publisher Eschig)
- Romance et Tarantelle Trumpet and Piano (publisher Eschig)
- Etudes lyriques Trombone solo (with piano ad lib.) (publisher Eschig)
- Fantaisie lyrique Trombone and Piano (publisher Eschig)
- 2 Pièce breves Tuba and Piano (publisher Eschig)
- Cantabile et Divertissement Tuba and Piano (publisher Eschig)
- Tuba-Nova Tuba and Piano (publisher Eschig)
- Barcarolle et Chanson Bacchique (in C or Bb) Tuba and Piano (publisher Alphonse Leduc)
- Offrande (arr. J.P.Mathez) for 2 trumpets & 2 trombones (publisher Billaudot)
- Two Pieces for four trombones (publisher Editions Transatlantiques)
- Offrande (coll. J.Douay) for Brass Quintet (publisher Billaudot)
- La Saint-Jean à Bourbourg for Band (publisher Alphonse Leduc)
