= Joseph Frédéric Bérard =

French physician and philosopher (1789–1828)

Joseph Frédéric Bérard (4 November 1789 – 16 April 1828) was a French medical doctor and philosopher. He was born at Montpellier.

== Life ==
Educated at the medical school in Montpellier, he afterwards went to Paris, where he was employed in connection with the Dictionnaire des sciences medicales. He returned in 1816, and published a work, Doctrine medicale de l'école de Montpellier (1819), which is indispensable to a proper understanding of the principles of the Vitalistic school, more specifically Doctrine medicale de l'école de Montpellier.

In 1823 he was called to a chair of medicine at Paris, which he held for three years; he was then nominated professor of hygiene at Montpellier. His health gave way under his labours, and he died in 1828. His most important book is his Doctrines des rapports du physique et du moral (Paris, 1823).

He held that consciousness or internal perception reveals to us the existence of an immaterial, thinking, feeling and willing subject, the self or soul. Alongside of this there is the vital force, the nutritive Tower, which uses the physical frame as its organ. The soul and the principle of life are in constant reciprocal action, and the first owes to the second, not the formation of its faculties, but the conditions under which they are evolved. He showed himself unable to understand the points of view of those whom he criticized, and yet his own theories, midway between vitalism and animism, are entirely destitute of originality.

To the Esprit des doctrines medicales de Montpellier, published posthumously (Paris, 1830), the editor, H. Petiot, prefixed an account of his life and works; see also Damiron, Phil. en France an XIX' siècle (Paris, 1834); C. J. Tissot, Anthropologie générale (1843).
