= Henri Dobert =

Henri Dobert (January 31, 1915 – December 9, 1943) was a member of the Buckmaster resistant cell during World War II. He was in charge of gathering information on building, location and troop movement in the Cabourg-Houlgate sector in Normandy. He was hired for the construction of the Atlantic Wall by the Organisation Todt and was able to gather information.

== Execution ==
He was arrested by the Gestapo and shot soon later in 9 December 1943 near Rouen.
