= Andrée Clair =

French writer

Andrée Clair (May 5, 1916 - 1982) was a writer who was born in France as Renée Jung, and spent her later days in France, but is also associated with Niger. She studied Africa at the Ethnological Institute in the Sorbonne University. She was noted for her ethnographic study of Niger and writing children's books set in Africa. From 1961 to 1974, she was on a cultural mission to the President of Niger. Her books include Bemba [An African Adventure].
