= Jean Pierre Philippe Lampué =

French politician and photographer

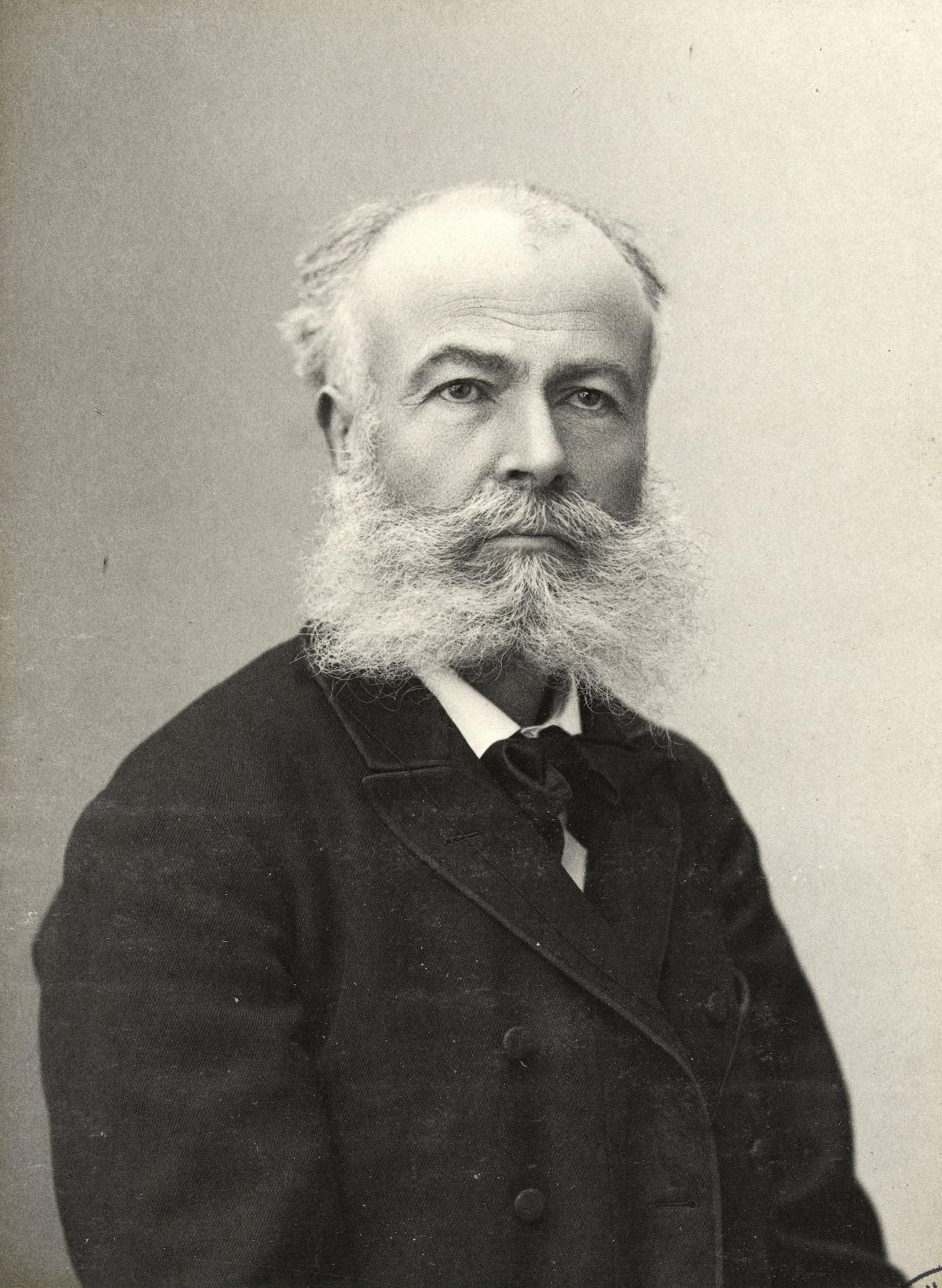
- Born: 1836; Montréjeau, France
- Died: 1924 (aged 87–88); Paris, France
- Occupations: Photographer and Politician
- Known for: Architectural photography

Jean Pierre Philippe Lampué (1836–1924) was a 19th-century French politician and photographer who worked for the "École of Beaux Arts of Paris".

== Biography ==
Pierre Lampué studied in the Seminary of Polignan and also in the School of Beautiful Arts in Toulouse. Sources indicate that he may have travelled to Spain in 1864. In 1865, he established in Paris at rue Saint Jacques 237. He became official photographer of the École of Beaux Arts of Paris. During his life, he also achieved the following milestones:

- Councillor of the 5th District of Paris in 1888.
- Elected municipal councillor of Paris for the Val de Grace neighbourhood. In the council, he belonged to the commission of "teaching and beautiful arts" in 1890.
- He became part of the Honour Committee for the First International Exposition of Photography and Industry as councillor of Paris in 1892.
- Lampué was re-elected as councillor in 1893 and 1896 but lost in 1900 elections.
- Member of the French Society of Photography from 1873 to 1885.
- Member of the Chamber of Labour Union of Photography.

== Photography ==
Lampué participated in exhibitions by the French Society of Photography in 1876 and in 1882. He held his own photographic studio in rue Saint Jacques 237, in Paris until 1879. The Studio was called "French-Spanish photography". This studio was later moved to the Boulevard Port Royal 72 in Paris.

Some of his works, like the album "Façades de Maisons, Villas et Hôtels á Paris", gathered the architecture of Paris. He ended up his photographic activities in 1890.

== Artwork holders ==
Holders of photographs by Pierre Lampué are:

- J. Paul Getty Museum
- Rikjsmuseum Ámsterdam
- Snite Museum of Art

Apart from this, the National Archives of France received, in 1879, 21 heliographic planches by Lampué of the most important monuments in Paris.

== Exhibitions ==
- Onzienme Exposition de la Société Nacional de Photographie en 1876. Palais de la Industrie.
- Exposition Universelle 1878.
