= Frédéric Febvre =

French actor (1835–1916)

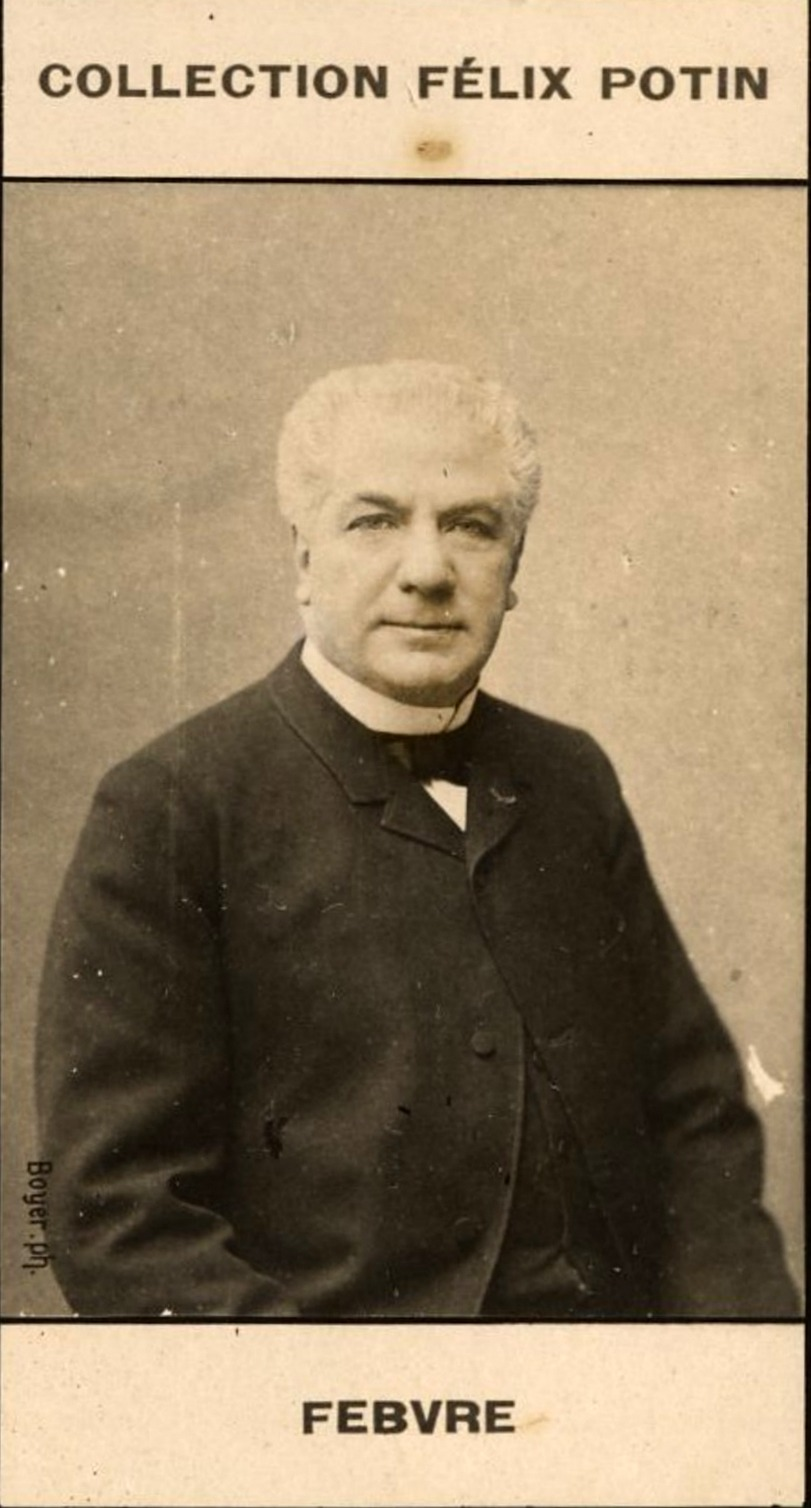
Frédéric Febvre

Alexandre Frédéric Febvre (1835 – 14 December 1916) was a French actor.

== Biography ==
He was born in Paris, and after the usual apprenticeship in the provinces and in several Parisian theatres in small parts, was called to the Comédie-Française in 1866, where he made his debut as Philip II in Don Juan d'Autriche. He soon became the most popular leading man in Paris, not only in the classical repertoire, but in contemporary novelties. He performed at the Comédie-Française between 1863 and 1894.

He retired from the Paris stage in 1893, in 1894 he toured the principal cities of Europe, and, in 1895, of America. He was also a composer of light music for the piano, and published several books of varying merit. He married Mlle. Harville, daughter of one of his predecessors at the Comédie-Française, herself a well-known actress.

He retired from the Paris stage in 1893, and made a final tour of certain European capitals the following year. He died in Paris.
