= Mathieu Auguste Geffroy =

French historian

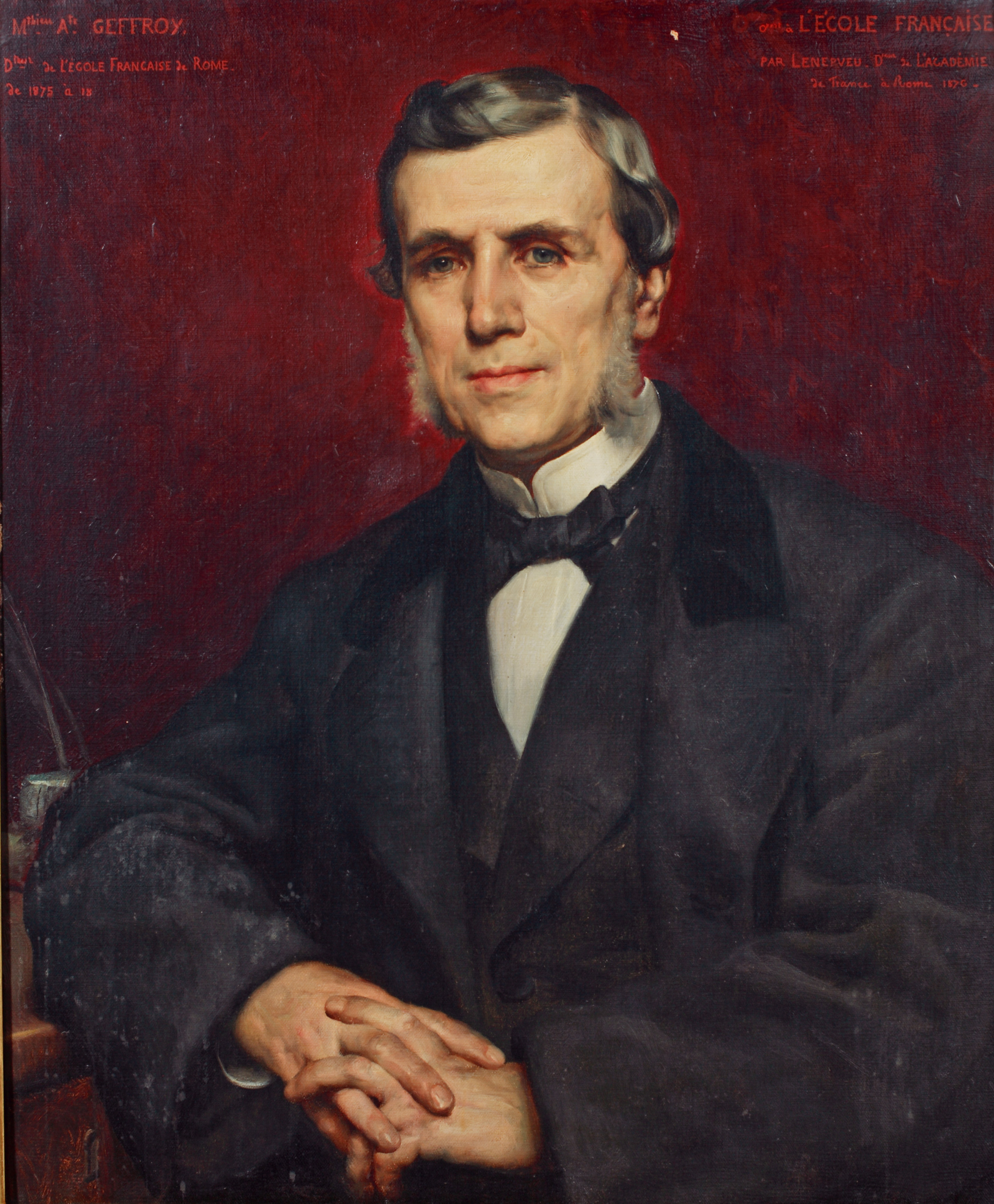

Mathieu Auguste Geffroy (21 April 1820 – 16 August 1895) was a French historian born in Paris.

After studying at the École Normale Supérieure, he held history professorships at various lycées. His French thesis for the doctorate of letters, Étude sur les pamphlets politiques et religieux de Milton (1848), showed that he was attracted towards foreign history, a study for which he soon qualified himself by mastering the Germanic and Scandinavian languages.

In 1851, he published a Histoire des états scandinaves, which is especially valuable for clear arrangement and for the trustworthiness of its facts. Later, a long stay in Sweden furnished him with valuable documents for a political and social history of Sweden and France at the end of the 18th century.

In 1864 and 1865 he published in the Revue des deux Mondes a series of articles on Gustav III of Sweden and the French court, which were republished in book form in 1867. To the second volume he appended a critical study on Marie Antoinette et Louis XVI apocryphes, in which he proved, by evidence drawn from documents in the private archives of the emperor of Austria, that the letters published by Feuillet de Conches (Louis XVI, Marie Antoinette et Madame Elisabeth, 1864–1873) and Hunolstein (Corresp. inédite de Marie Antoinette, 1864) are forgeries. With the collaboration of Alfred von Arneth, director of the imperial archives at Vienna, he edited the Correspondance secrète entre Marie-Thérèse et le comte de Mercy-Argenteau (3 vols., 1874), the first account based on trustworthy documents of Marie Antoinette's character, private conduct and policy.

The Franco-Prussian War drew Geffroy's attention to the origins of Germany, and his Rome et les Barbares: Étude sur la Germanie de Tacite (1874) set forth some of the results of German scholarship. He was then appointed to superintend the opening of the French school of archaeology at Rome, and drew up two useful reports (1877 and 1884) on its origin and early work. But his personal tastes always led him back to the study of modern history.

When the Paris archives of foreign affairs were thrown open to students, it was decided to publish a collection of the instructions given to French ambassadors since 1648 (Recueil des instructions données aux ambassadeurs et ministres de France depuis le traité de Westphalie), and Geffroy was commissioned to edit the volumes dealing with Sweden (vol. ii., 1885) and Denmark (vol. xiii., 1895). In the interval he wrote Madame de Maintenon d'après sa correspondance authentique (2 vols., 1887), in which he displayed his penetrating critical faculty in discriminating between authentic documents and the additions and corrections of arrangers like La Beaumelle and Lavallée. His last works were an Essai sur la formation des collections d'antiques de la Suède and Des institutions et des mœurs du paganisme scandinave: l'Islande avant le Christianisme, both published posthumously. He died at Bièvre, Belgium on 16 August 1895.
