= 1858 in France =

- Decades: 1830s; 1840s; 1850s; 1860s; 1870s
- See also: History of France; Timeline of French history; List of years in France

Events from the year 1858 in France.

== Incumbents ==
- Monarch – Napoleon III

== Events ==
- 14 January - Orsini affair: Piedmontese revolutionary Felice Orsini and his accomplices fail to assassinate Napoleon III in Paris but their Orsini bombs kill 156 bystanders. Orsini is executed on 13 March by guillotine.
- 11 February - Lourdes apparitions: Pauper girl Bernadette Soubirous of Lourdes, 14, has a vision at the grotto of Massabielle, the first in a series of eighteen events (up to 16 August) which will come to be regarded as Marian apparitions.
- August - The first aerial photography is carried out by Nadar, from a tethered balloon.
- September - Cochinchina Campaign: French warships, under Charles Rigault de Genouilly, attack and occupy Da Nang, Vietnam.

== Arts and literature ==
- 21 October - Following the lifting of government licensing restrictions on the number of performers, Jacques Offenbach's first 2-act opéra bouffe, Orpheus in the Underworld (Orphée aux enfers), is premiered at Théâtre des Bouffes-Parisiens.
- Camille Saint-Saëns succeeds Louis James Alfred Lefébure-Wély as organist of La Madeleine, Paris.

== Births ==
- 6 January - Sébastien Faure, anarchist, (died 1942)
- 9 January - Maurice Couette, physicist (died 1943)
- 21 January - Mélanie Bonis, composer (died 1937)
- 31 January - André Antoine, actor-manager (died 1943)
- 7 February - Amédée-François Lamy, military officer (died 1900)
- 15 April - Émile Durkheim, sociologist (died 1917)
- 19 May - Roland Bonaparte, prince, president of the Société de Géographie (died 1924)
- 28 August - Charles le Bargy, actor and film director (died 1936)
- August - Guy d'Hardelot (Helen Rhodes, née Guy), composer, pianist and teacher (died 1936)

== Deaths ==
- 15 January - Antoine Maurice Apollinaire d'Argout, statesman, minister and governor of the Bank of France (born 1782)
- 8 February - Ambroise Roux-Alphéran, historian (born 1776)
- 27 March - Jean Guillaume Audinet-Serville, entomologist (born 1775)
- 9 April - Auguste François Chomel, pathologist (born 1788)
- 3 May - Julien Auguste Pélage Brizeux, poet (born 1803)
- 21 May - Charles-Louis Havas, writer and founder of Agence France-Presse (born 1783)
- 10 July - Auguste de Montferrand, architect (born 1786)
- 5 August - Joseph-Marie, comte Portalis, diplomat and statesman (born 1778)
- 10 December - Joseph Paul Gaimard, naval surgeon and naturalist (born 1793)
