= 1859 in France =

- Decades: 1830s; 1840s; 1850s; 1860s; 1870s
- See also: History of France; Timeline of French history; List of years in France

Events from the year 1859 in France.

== Incumbents ==
- Monarch – Napoleon III

== Events ==
- 26 March - Attempting to explain Mercury's solar orbit, mathematician Urbain Le Verrier has proposed the existence of a hypothetical planet, Vulcan, inside its orbit and amateur astronomer Edmond Modeste Lescarbault claims to have observed it on this date.
- 23 April - Austria issues an ultimatum seeking the complete de-militarization of the Kingdom of Sardinia.
- 29 April - Second Italian War of Independence begins, when Austrian ultimatum is ignored.
- 14 May - Napoleon III arrives in Alessandria, taking command of the operations.
- 20 May - Battle of Montebello, Piedmontese cavalry and French infantry defeat Austrian troops.
- 30 May - Battle of Palestro, French-Sardinian victory.
- 4 June - Battle of Magenta, French-Sardinian victory under Napoleon III against the Austrians.
- 24 June - Battle of Solferino, French-Sardinian victory.
- 30 June - Charles Blondin crosses Niagara Falls on a tightrope for the first time.
- 12 July - Armistice of Villafranca ends the Second Italian War of Independence.
- 24 November - The French Navy's La Gloire ("Glory"), the first ocean-going ironclad warship in history, is launched.

== Arts and literature ==
- 19 March - Charles Gounod's opera Faust is first performed, at the Théâtre Lyrique on the Boulevard du Temple in Paris.
- 30 April - English writer Charles Dickens' historical novel A Tale of Two Cities begins publication in London.
- 19 December - César Franck inaugurates the new organ at the basilia of Sainte-Clotilde, Paris, an instrument built by Aristide Cavaillé-Coll.
- Georges Bizet composes the opera buffa Don Procopio and symphonic poem Vasco de Gama while in Rome.
- Sculptor Aimé Millet receives the Légion d'honneur.
- Occitan language campaigner Frédéric Mistral publishes his long poem Mirèio in Avignon.

== Births ==
- 15 May - Pierre Curie, physicist, shared the 1903 Nobel Prize in physics (died 1906)
- 3 July – Abel Julien Pagnard, French engineer and architect (died 1913)
- 7 August – Gustave Belot, professor and philosopher (died 1929)
- 3 September - Jean Jaurès, socialist and pacifist (assassinated) (died 1914)
- 9 October - Alfred Dreyfus, military officer (see: Dreyfus Affair) (died 1935)
- 18 October - Henri Bergson, philosopher (died 1941)
- 2 December - Georges-Pierre Seurat, painter (died 1891)
- 17 December - Paul César Helleu, artist (died 1927)

== Deaths ==
- 18 March - Jean Louis Lassaigne, chemist (born 1800)
- 16 April - Alexis de Tocqueville, political thinker and historian (born 1805)
- 5 July - Charles Cagniard de la Tour, engineer and physicist (born 1777)
- 23 July - Marceline Desbordes-Valmore, poet (born 1786)
- 7 November - Auguste Hilarion, comte de Kératry, poet, novelist, historian and politician (born 1769)
- 19 November - Charles-Gaspard Delestre-Poirson, playwright and theatre director (born 1790)
- Full date unknown - Pierre Boitard, botanist and geologist (born 1789)
