= 1856 in France =

- Decades: 1830s; 1840s; 1850s; 1860s; 1870s
- See also: History of France; Timeline of French history; List of years in France

Events from the year 1856 in France.

== Incumbents ==
- Monarch – Napoleon III

== Events ==
- 30 March - Treaty of Paris is signed by Russia and an alliance of the Ottoman Empire, the Kingdom of Sardinia, France, and the United Kingdom, settling the Crimean War.

== Births ==
- 1 February - Louis-Anne-Jean Brocq, dermatologist (died 1928)
- 16 March - Napoléon Eugène, Prince Imperial, only child of Emperor Napoleon III and his Empress consort Eugénie de Montijo (died 1879)
- 24 April - Philippe Pétain, Marshal of France, later Chief of State of Vichy France (died 1951)
- 25 May - Louis Franchet d'Espérey, general during World War I (died 1942)
- 5 June - Gabrielle Réjane, actress (died 1920)
- 1 September - Louis-Ernest Dubois, Roman Catholic Cardinal and Archbishop of Paris (died 1929)
- 29 October - Jacques Curie, physicist (died 1941)

=== Full date unknown ===
- Eugène Louis Bouvier, entomologist and carcinologist (died 1944)
- Thérèse Humbert, fraudster (died 1918)

== Deaths ==
=== January to June ===
- 4 January - Pierre Jean David, sculptor (born 1788)
- 6 January - Nicolas-Charles Bochsa, musician and composer (born 1789)
- 29 February - Auguste Chapdelaine, Christian missionary to China (born 1814)
- March - Louise Rosalie Allan-Despreaux, actress (born 1810)
- 27 April - Louis Joseph César Ducornet, painter (born 1806)
- 3 May - Adolphe Adam, composer and music critic (born 1803)
- 12 May - Jacques Philippe Marie Binet, mathematician, physicist and astronomer (born 1786)
- 13 May - Jean Zuléma Amussat, surgeon (born 1796)
- 14 May - Théodore Guérin (Saint Theodora), missionary (born 1798)

=== July to December ===
- 8 October - Théodore Chassériau, painter (born 1819)
- 12 October - Jean Bachelot La Pylaie, botanist, explorer and archaeologist (born 1786)
- 4 November - Hippolyte Delaroche, painter (born 1797)
- 9 November - Étienne Cabet, philosopher and utopian socialist (born 1788)
- 25 December - Princess Elisabeth of Savoy-Carignan (born 1800)

=== Full date unknown ===
- Jean-Baptiste-Joseph Duchesne, painter and miniaturist (born 1770)
- Charles de Steuben, painter (born 1788)
