= 1849 in France =

- Decades: 1820s; 1830s; 1840s; 1850s; 1860s
- See also: History of France; Timeline of French history; List of years in France

Events from the year 1849 in France.

== Events ==
- 1 January - France's first postage stamp, Ceres, is issued.
- 16 April - Giacomo Meyerbeer's grand opera Le prophète is premièred by the Paris Opera at the Salle Le Peletier with Pauline Viardot (who has collaborated extensively in the production) in the mezzo-soprano role, her first with the Opera. Stage effects include electric light, ballet on roller skates and the use of saxhorns. The audience includes President Louis-Napoleon Bonaparte (future Emperor), Berlioz and the terminally ill Chopin.
- 27 April - Giuseppe Garibaldi enters Rome to defend it from the French troops of General Oudinot.
- 13 May - Legislative election held.
- 3 July - French troops occupy Rome. Roman Republic surrenders.

== Births ==
- 12 January - Jean Béraud, painter and commercial artist (died 1935)
- 8 February - Henri Amédée de Broglie, nobleman (died 1917)
- 21 February - Edouard Deville, first to perfect a practical method of photogrammetry (died 1924)
- 4 April - Félix Balzer, physician (died 1929)
- 2 June - Paul-Albert Besnard, painter (died 1934)
- 3 July - Prosper-René Blondlot, physicist (died 1930)
- 19 July
  - François Victor Alphonse Aulard, historian (died 1928)
  - Ferdinand Brunetière, writer and critic (died 1906)
- 20 July - Théobald Chartran, painter (died 1907)
- 3 August - Joseph Jules Dejerine, neurologist (died 1917)
- 18 August - Benjamin Godard, violinist and composer (died 1895)

== Deaths ==
- 13 April - Théophile Marion Dumersan, writer and numismatist (born 1780)
- 16 April - Philippe-Frédéric Blandin, physician and surgeon (born 1798)
- 28 April - René-Primevère Lesson, surgeon and naturalist (born 1794)
- 11 May - Jeanne Françoise Julie Adélaïde Récamier, leader of the literary and political circles (born 1777)
- 10 June - Thomas Robert Bugeaud, Marshal of France and Governor-General of Algeria (born 1784)
- 26 August - Jacques Féréol Mazas, composer, conductor and violinist (born 1782)
- 12 November - Alexis-François Artaud De Montor, diplomat and historian (born 1772)
- 21 November - François Marius Granet, painter (born 1777)
- 27 December - Jacques-Laurent Agasse, painter (born 1767)
- 28 December - Quatremère de Quincy, archaeologist and writer on art (born 1755)
