= 1861 in France =

- Decades: 1840s; 1850s; 1860s; 1870s; 1880s
- See also: History of France; Timeline of French history; List of years in France

Events from the year 1861 in France.

== Incumbents ==
- Monarch – Napoleon III

== Events ==
- News of Henri Mouhot's discovery of Angkor Wat is published.

== Births ==
- 1 January – Jacques Émile Blanche, painter (died 1942)
- 15 February – Charles Édouard Guillaume, physicist, awarded Nobel Prize in Physics in 1920 (died 1938)
- 21 February – Pierre de Bréville, composer (died 1949)
- 30 October – Antoine Bourdelle, sculptor (died 1929)
- 2 November – Maurice Blondel, philosopher (died 1949)
- 8 December
  - Aristide Maillol, sculptor (died 1944)
  - Georges Méliès, filmmaker (died 1938)
- 16 December – Antonio de La Gandara, painter and draughtsman (died 1917)

== Deaths ==
- 5 February – Pierre Bosquet, Marshal of France (born 1810)
- 10 April – Édouard Ménétries, entomologist (born 1802)
- 14 July – Frédéric de Lafresnaye, ornithologist (born 1783)
- 24 August – Pierre Berthier, geologist and mining engineer (born 1782)
- 22 September – Rose Chéri, actress (born 1824)
- 10 November – Henri Mouhot, naturalist and explorer (born 1826)
- 10 November – Isidore Geoffroy Saint-Hilaire, zoologist (born 1805)
- 15 November – David Carcassonne, physician (born 1789)
- 20 November – Pierre Frédéric Sarrus, mathematician (born 1798)
- 21 November – Jean-Baptiste Henri Lacordaire, ecclesiastic, preacher, journalist and political activist (born 1802)
- 25 November – Ferdinand Eckstein, philosopher and playwright (born 1790 in Denmark)

=== Full date unknown ===
- Hippolyte André Jean Baptiste Chélard, composer, violinist and conductor (born 1789)
- Marie-Alfred de Suin, French vice-admiral and commander (born 1796)
