= 1850 in France =

- Decades: 1830s; 1840s; 1850s; 1860s; 1870s
- See also: History of France; Timeline of French history; List of years in France

Events from the year 1850 in France.

== Events ==
- 15 April - Angers Bridge collapses with around 480 soldiers marching across it; about 226 are killed.
- 16 May - Battleship Le Napoléon is launched.
- France begins to transport colonists to Algeria.

== Births ==
- 14 January - Pierre Loti, sailor and writer (died 1923)
- 31 May - Alphonse Pénaud, aeronautical pioneer (died 1880)
- 5 August - Guy de Maupassant, writer (died 1893)
- 6 August - Henri Chantavoine, writer (died 1918)
- 25 August - Charles Richet, physiologist, awarded Nobel Prize for Physiology or Medicine in 1913 (died 1935)

== Deaths ==
=== January to June ===
- 22 January - William Joseph Chaminade, priest, beatified (born 1761)
- 22 March - Sophie d'Arbouville, writer (born 1810)
- 16 April - Marie Tussaud, wax sculptor (born 1761)
- 1 May - Henri Marie Ducrotay de Blainville, zoologist and anatomist (born 1777)
- 9 May - Joseph Louis Gay-Lussac, chemist and physicist (born 1778)

=== July to December ===
- 18 August - Honoré de Balzac, novelist and playwright (born 1799)
- 26 August - Louis-Philippe of France, last king of France (born 1773)
- 9 November - François-Xavier-Joseph Droz, writer on ethics, political science and political economy (born 1773)
- 10 December - François Sulpice Beudant, mineralogist and geologist (born 1787)
- 24 December - Frédéric Bastiat, writer and political economist (born 1801)

=== Full date unknown ===
- Armand-Benjamin Caillau, Roman Catholic priest, a missionary and writer (born 1794)
