= 1863 in France =

- Decades: 1840s; 1850s; 1860s; 1870s; 1880s
- See also: History of France; Timeline of French history; List of years in France

Events from the year 1863 in France.

== Incumbents ==
- Monarch – Napoleon III

== Events ==
- 15 January - French forces bombard Veracruz, during the French intervention in Mexico.
- 16 March - French siege of Puebla begins.
- 14 April - Treaty of Hué is signed between Vietnam and the French Empire.
- 30 April - Battle of Camarón, between the French Foreign Legion and the Mexican army: Mexican victory, but successful French delaying action.
- 17 May - Puebla surrenders to the French.
- 7 June - French troops enter Mexico City.
- 21–22 June - Legislative election, first round.
- 5–6 July - Legislative election, second round.
- First outbreak of phylloxera on the European mainland observed in the vineyards of the southern Rhône region.
- The recipe for the herbal liqueur Bénédictine is devised by Alexandre Le Grand in Fécamp.
- The Paris Observatory begins to publish weather maps.

== Arts and literature ==
- 31 January - Jules Verne's scientifically inspired novel Five Weeks in a Balloon (Cinq semaines en ballon) is published by Pierre-Jules Hetzel in Paris; it will be the first of Verne's Voyages Extraordinaires.
- 30 September - Georges Bizet's opera, Les pêcheurs de perles receives its première at the Théâtre Lyrique in Paris.
- 4 November - Hector Berlioz's opera Les Troyens receives its première at the Théâtre Lyrique.

== Births ==
- 1 January - Pierre de Coubertin, historian and founder of the International Olympic Committee (died 1937)
- 16 April - Émile Friant, painter (died 1932)
- 26 May - Charles-Victor Langlois, historian and paleographer (died 1929)
- 7 July - Marguerite Audoux, novelist (died 1937)
- 12 July - Albert Calmette, physician, bacteriologist and immunologist (died 1933)
- 8 November - René Viviani, politician, Prime Minister (died 1925)

== Deaths ==
- 16 February - Pierre-Médard Diard, naturalist and explorer (born 1794)
- 21 February - Pierre-Nolasque Bergeret, painter, lithographer and designer (born 1782)
- 25 February - Laure Cinti-Damoreau, soprano (born 1801)
- 30 March - Auguste Bravais, physicist (born 1811)
- 12 July - Étienne-Jean Delécluze, painter and critic (born 1781)
- 13 August - Eugène Delacroix, painter (born 1798)
- 17 September - Alfred de Vigny, poet, playwright and novelist (born 1797)
- 13 October - Philippe Antoine d'Ornano, Marshal of France (born 1784)
- 16 November - Louis-René Villermé, doctor and economist (born 1782)
- 17 December - Émile Saisset, philosopher (born 1814)
- 30 December - Frédéric Monod, Protestant pastor (born 1794)
- Alphonse de Polignac, mathematician (born 1826)
