= 1857 in France =

- Decades: 1830s; 1840s; 1850s; 1860s; 1870s
- See also: History of France; Timeline of French history; List of years in France

Events from the year 1857 in France.

== Incumbents ==
- Monarch – Napoleon III

== Events ==
- 3 March - France and the United Kingdom formally declare war on China in the Second Opium War.
- 27 April - First horse race run at Longchamp Racecourse in Paris.
- 21 June - Legislative election held.
- 5 July - Legislative election held for the second legislature of the French Second Empire.

== Arts and literature ==
- 18 April - The Spirits' Book (Le Livre des Esprits in original French), one of The Five Fundamental Works of Spiritism, is published by the French educator Allan Kardec.
- The Flowers of Evil (Les Fleurs du mal in original French), an immensely influential collection of Charles Baudelaire's first poems, is published.

== Births ==
- 4 January - Émile Cohl, caricaturist, cartoonist and animator (died 1938)
- 18 January - Eugène Gley, physiologist and endocrinologist (died 1930)
- 12 February - Eugène Atget, photographer (died 1927)
- 26 February - Émile Coué, psychologist and pharmacist (died 1926)
- 3 March - Alfred Bruneau, composer (died 1934)
- 22 March - Paul Doumer, President of France (assassinated 1932)
- 30 March - Léon Charles Thévenin, telegraph engineer (died 1926)
- 1 June - Le Pétomane (Joseph Pujol), flatulist (died 1945)
- 29 June - Jean-François Klobb, colonial officer (died 1899)
- 10 August - Georges Aaron Bénédite, Egyptologist (died 1926)

== Deaths ==
- 22 February - Joseph Crétin, first Roman Catholic Bishop of Saint Paul, Minnesota (born 1799)
- 2 May - Alfred de Musset, dramatist, poet and novelist (born 1810)
- 11 May - Eugène François Vidocq, criminal, later first director of Sûreté Nationale (born 1775)
- 17 May - Adolphe Dureau de la Malle, geographer, naturalist, historian and artist (born 1777)
- 23 May - Augustin Louis Cauchy, mathematician (born 1789)
- 30 June - Alcide d'Orbigny, naturalist (born 1802)
- 29 July - Charles Lucien Bonaparte, naturalist and ornithologist (born 1803)
- 3 August - Eugène Sue, novelist (born 1804)
- 5 September - Auguste Comte, philosopher (born 1798)
- 28 October - Louis-Eugène Cavaignac, General (born 1802)
- 23 December - Achille Devéria, painter and lithographer (born 1800)
