= 1788 in France =

- Decades: 1760s; 1770s; 1780s; 1790s; 1800s
- See also: History of France; Timeline of French history; List of years in France

Events from the year 1788 in France.

== Incumbents ==
- Monarch: Louis XVI

== Events ==
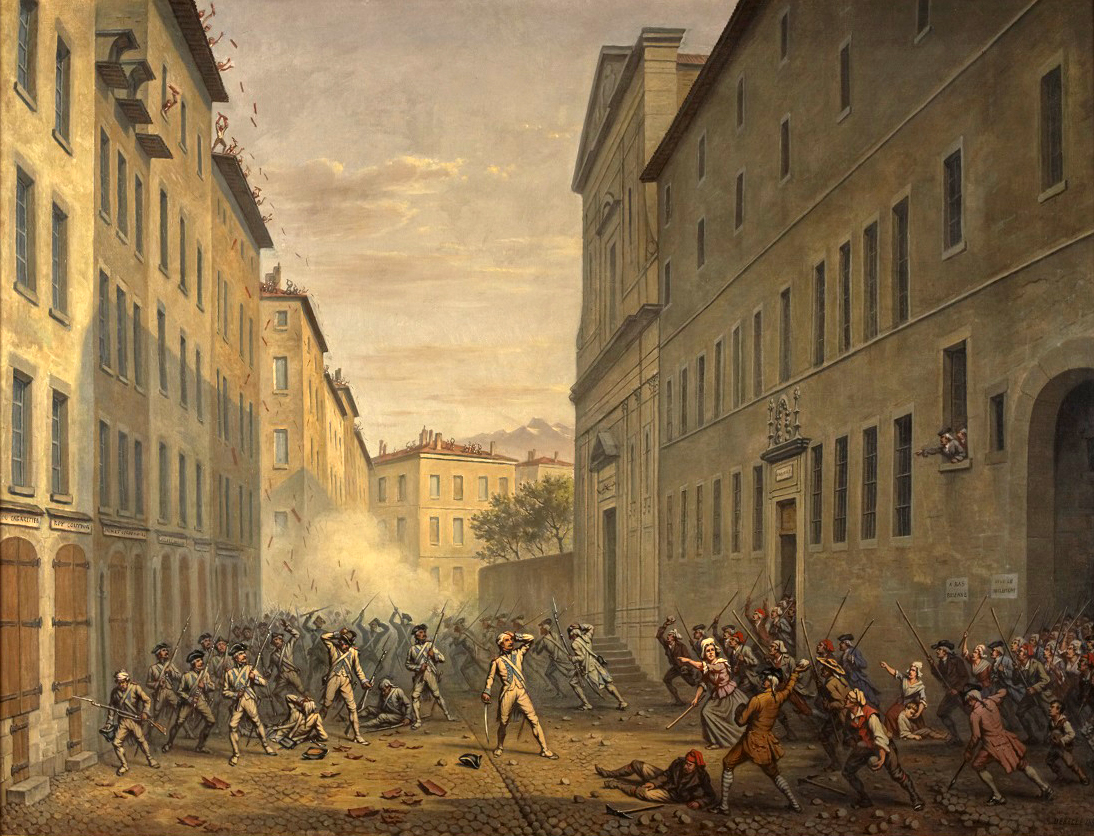
Day of the Tiles, 7 June 1788, by Alexandre Debelle, (Musée de la Révolution française)

- 7 June - Riots broke out in Grenoble, the Day of the Tiles.
- 21 July - Assembly of Vizille, the meeting of the Estates.
- 8 August - Louis XVI agreed to convene the Estates-General meeting in May 1789, for the first time since 1614.

== Births ==
=== January to June ===
- 1 January - Étienne Cabet, philosopher and utopian socialist (died 1856)
- 6 January - Louis Marie de la Haye, Vicomte de Cormenin, jurist and political pamphleteer (died 1868)
- 18 February - Alexandre Soumet, poet (died 1845)
- 7 March - Antoine César Becquerel, scientist (died 1878)
- 12 March - Pierre Jean David, sculptor (died 1856)
- 22 March - Pierre Joseph Pelletier, chemist (died 1842)
- 13 April - Auguste François Chomel, pathologist (died 1858)
- 18 April - Charles de Steuben, painter (died 1856)
- 10 May - Augustin-Jean Fresnel, physicist (died 1827)

=== July to December ===
- 1 July - Jean-Victor Poncelet, engineer and mathematician (died 1867)
- 5 September - Jean-Pierre Abel-Rémusat, sinologist (died 1832)
- 24 December - Alexandre Guiraud, poet and novelist (died 1847)
- 31 December - Alphonse de Cailleux, painter and arts administrator (died 1876)

== Deaths ==
=== January to June ===
- 14 January - François Joseph Paul de Grasse, Admiral (born 1722)
- 25 January - Jean-Louis Alléon-Dulac, naturalist (born 1723)
- 4 February - Claude-Étienne Savary, orientalist, pioneer of Egyptology and translator of the Qur'an (born 1750)
- 17 February - Maurice Quentin de La Tour, painter (born 1704)
- 12 April - Carlo Antonio Campioni, composer (born 1720)
- 16 April - Georges-Louis Leclerc, Comte de Buffon, naturalist, mathematician, biologist, cosmologist and author (born 1707)
- 2 May - Antoine de Montazet, theologian and Archbishop of Lyon (born 1713)

=== July to December ===
- 3 July - François Jacquier, Franciscan mathematician and physicist (born 1711)
- 15 July - Jean Germain Drouais, painter (born 1763)
- 8 August - Louis François Armand du Plessis, duc de Richelieu, Marshal of France (born 1696)
- 19 October - Louis Antoine de Gontaut, Marshal of France (born 1700)
- 6 December - Nicole-Reine Lepaute, astronomer (born 1723)
- 8 December - Pierre André de Suffren de Saint Tropez, Admiral (born 1729)
