= 1864 in France =

- Decades: 1840s; 1850s; 1860s; 1870s; 1880s
- See also: History of France; Timeline of French history; List of years in France

Events from the year 1864 in France.

== Incumbents ==
- Monarch – Napoleon III

== Events ==
- 10 April – Second French intervention in Mexico: Treaty of Miramar.
- 4 May – Société Générale bank established in Paris.
- 14 May – The Orgueil meteorite falls to earth.
- 19 June – American Civil War: Battle of Cherbourg - Confederate States Navy CSS Alabama is sunk in a single-ship action with USS Kearsarge in la Manche off the coast of Cherbourg Harbour.
- 5–6 September – Bombardment of Shimonoseki: An international naval fleet including three French ships defeats Japanese daimyō Mōri Takachika in the Shimonoseki Straits of Japan.

== Arts and literature ==
- April – Charles Baudelaire leaves Paris for Belgium in the hope of resolving his financial difficulties.
- 11 May – The Winged Victory of Samothrace arrives at the Louvre.
- 26 May – Alexandre Dumas, fils marries Nadejda Naryschkine. His father, Alexandre Dumas, père, returns to Paris from Italy.
- 17 December – Jacques Offenbach's opéra bouffe La Belle Hélène receives its first performance at the Théâtre des Variétés in Paris.
- Jules Verne's Journey to the Center of the Earth (Voyage au centre de la Terre) is published.

== Births ==
- 24 January – Marguerite Durand, actress, journalist and suffragette (died 1936).
- 1 March – Étienne Destot, radiologist and anatomist (died 1918).
- 16 March – Lucien Cayeux, sedimentary petrographer (died 1944).
- 10 May – Léon Gaumont, inventor, engineer, film pioneer and industrialist (died 1946).
- 11 November – Maurice Leblanc, novelist and short story writer (died 1941).
- 16 November – Stéphane Javelle, astronomer (died 1917)
- 24 November – Henri de Toulouse-Lautrec, painter (died 1901).
- 8 December – Camille Claudel, sculptor and graphic artist (died 1943).
- 28 December – Henri de Régnier, poet (died 1936).

== Deaths ==
- 28 January – Benoît Paul Émile Clapeyron, engineer and physicist (born 1799).
- 1 February – Princess Louise Marie Thérèse of France, Petite-Fille de France (born 1819).
- 2 March – Jean Alaux, painter (born 1786).
- 4 March – John James Appleton, diplomat (born 1789)
- 21 March – Jean-Hippolyte Flandrin, painter (born 1809).
- 27 March – Jean-Jacques Ampère, philologist (born 1800).
- 29 April – Charles Julien Brianchon, mathematician and chemist (born 1783).
- 22 May – Aimable Pélissier, Marshal of France (born 1794).
- 13 July – Célimène Gaudieux, musician and innkeeper (born 1807).
- 31 July – Louis Christophe François Hachette, publisher (born 1800).
- 7 August – Olympe-Philippe Gerbet, Roman Catholic Bishop and writer (born 1798).
- 1 September – Barthélemy Prosper Enfantin, social reformer (born 1796).
