= 1860 in France =

- Decades: 1840s; 1850s; 1860s; 1870s; 1880s
- See also: History of France; Timeline of French history; List of years in France

Events from the year 1860 in France.

== Incumbents ==
- Monarch – Napoleon III

== Events ==
- 1 January - Paris administratively annexes neighbouring communes.
- 23 January - Cobden-Chevalier Treaty Free Trade treaty is signed between the United Kingdom and France.
- 9 April - Typesetter Edouard-Leon Scott de Martinville sings "Au clair de la lune" into his phonautograph, producing the world's earliest known sound recording of a song. However, it would not be converted back into audible sound until 2008.
- 18 October - At the end of the Second Opium War, British and French troops enter the Forbidden City in Beijing.
- 24 October - Convention of Peking signed by Chinese with Britain and France.

== Births ==
- 11 February - Rachilde, author (died 1953)
- 25 June - Gustave Charpentier, composer (died 1956)
- 16 August - Jules Laforgue, poet (died 1887)
- 20 August - Raymond Poincaré, statesman, five times Prime Minister of France, President of France (died 1934)
- 26 November – Gabrielle Petit, feminist activist, anticlerical, libertarian socialist, and newspaper editor (died 1952)

== Deaths ==
- 29 January - Stéphanie de Beauharnais, consort of Karl, Grand Duke of Baden (born 1789)
- 14 March - Louis Antoine Jullien, conductor (born 1812)
- 31 March - Évariste Régis Huc, Catholic priest and traveller (born 1813)
- 28 May – Rosine de Chabaud-Latour, French religious thinker and translator (born 1794)
- 24 June - Jérôme Bonaparte, youngest brother of Napoleon, who made him king of Westphalia (born 1784)
- 22 August - Alexandre-Gabriel Decamps, painter (born 1803)
- 3 December - Joseph Marie Élisabeth Durocher, geologist (born 1817)
- 17 December - Désirée Clary, wife of King Charles XIV of Sweden and a one-time fiancée of Napoleon Bonaparte (born 1777)

=== Full date unknown ===
- Carron du Villards, ophthalmologist (born 1801)
