= 1785 in France =

- Decades: 1760s; 1770s; 1780s; 1790s; 1800s
- See also: History of France; Timeline of French history; List of years in France

Events from the year 1785 in France.

== Incumbents ==
- Monarch: Louis XVI

== Events ==
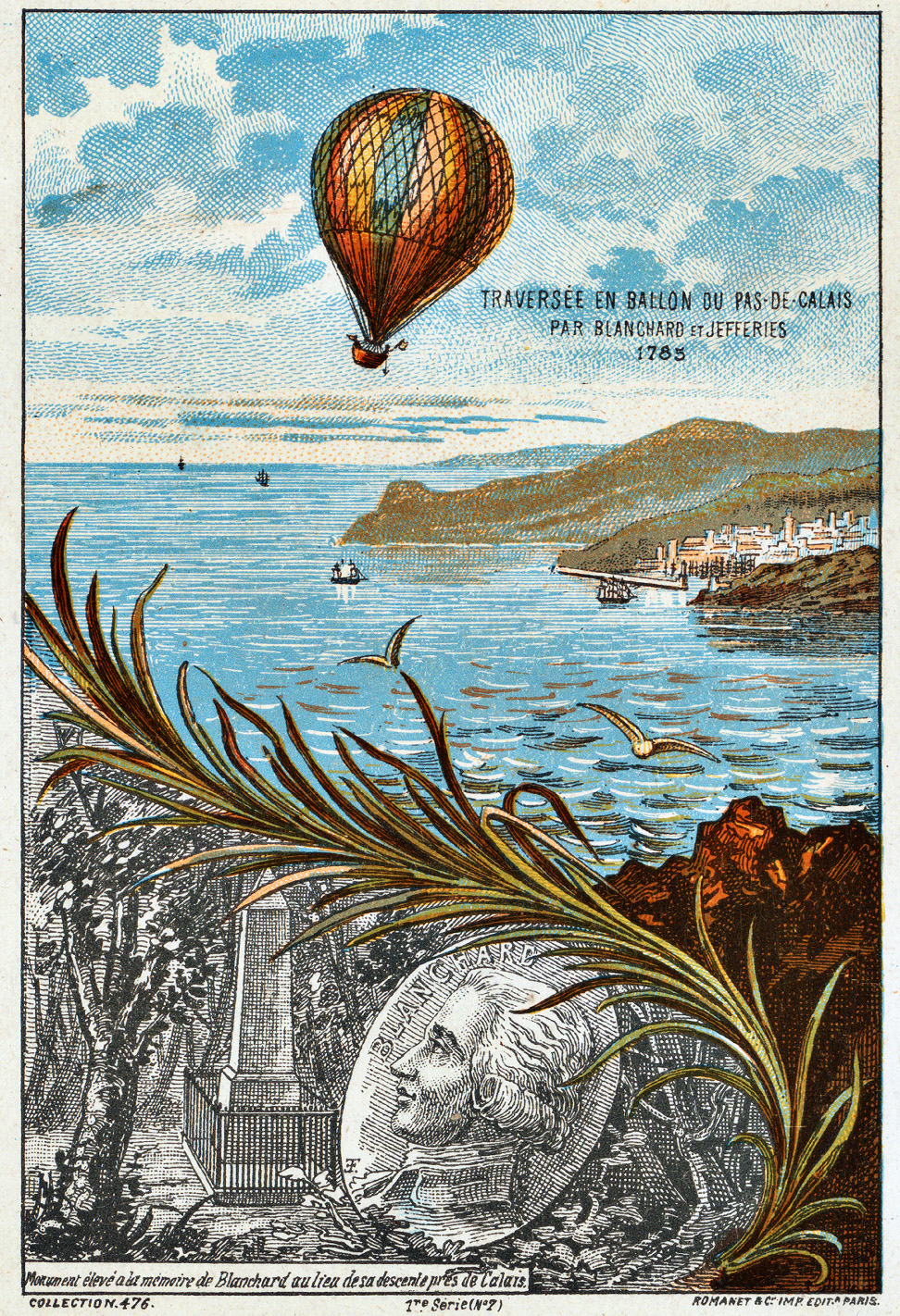
A depiction of Blanchard's channel crossing

=== January ===
- 7 January - French balloonist Jean-Pierre Blanchard crosses the English Channel in a balloon

=== July ===
- 16 July - The Piper-Heidsieck Champagne house is founded by Florens-Louis Heidsieck in Reims, France.

=== August ===
- 15 August - Cardinal de Rohan is arrested in Paris; the Necklace Affair comes into the open.

=== Date unknown ===
- Cabinet des Modes, the first fashion magazine, is published in France.

== Births ==
- 10 February - Claude-Louis Navier
- 27 March - Louis XVII
- 3 April - François-Jean-Hyacinthe Feutrier
- 21 April - Charles Joseph, comte de Flahaut
- 5 May - Charles Xavier Thomas
- 12 July - Joseph Pelet de la Lozère
- 30 September - Ange Hyacinthe Maxence, baron de Damas
- 5 October - Joseph Bernelle
- 10 October - Florestan I, Prince of Monaco
- 13 October - Jean-Charles Persil
- 28 November
  - Federico de Brandsen
  - Victor de Broglie
- 22 December - Achille Libéral Treilhard
- 26 December - Laurent Clerc
- Marie Durand, saint (d. 1864)

== Deaths ==
- 7 January - Marquis de Bussy-Castelnau
- 4 February - Donat Nonnotte
- 8 May - Étienne François, duc de Choiseul
- 15 June
  - Jean-François Pilâtre de Rozier, during failed cross channel balloon flight
- 20 August - Jean-Baptiste Pigalle
- 15 November - César Gabriel de Choiseul
- 18 November - Louis Philippe I, Duke of Orléans
