= 1775 in France =

- Decades: 1750s; 1760s; 1770s; 1780s; 1790s
- See also: History of France; Timeline of French history; List of years in France

Events from the year 1775 in France.

== Incumbents ==
- Monarch: Louis XVI

== Events ==
- April–May – Flour War: riots against bread prices.
- 11 June – Coronation of Louis XVI in Reims Cathedral, the last to take place during the Ancien régime
- Probable date – Jeanne Baret returns to France, becoming the first woman to complete a circumnavigation of the globe.

== Births ==
=== January to June ===
- 20 January – André-Marie Ampère, physicist (died 1836)
- 1 February – Philippe de Girard, engineer and inventor of the first flax spinning frame (died 1845)
- 3 February
  - Maximilien Sébastien Foy, military leader, statesman and writer (died 1825).
  - Louis-François Lejeune, general, painter and lithographer (died 1848).
- 30 April – Guillaume Dode de la Brunerie, Marshal of France (died 1851).
- 10 May – Antoine Charles Louis de Lasalle, cavalry general (killed in battle) (died 1809).

=== July to December ===
- 3 July – Antoine Philippe, Duke of Montpensier, younger brother of Louis Philippe I (died 1807).
- 23 July – Eugène-François Vidocq, criminal, later first director of Sûreté Nationale (died 1857).
- 6 August – Louis Antoine, Duke of Angoulême, last Dauphin of France (died 1844).
- 22 August – François Péron, naturalist and explorer (died 1810).
- 1 September – Honoré Charles Reille, Marshal of France (died 1860).
- 11 November – Jean Guillaume Audinet-Serville, entomologist (died 1858).
- 30 November – Jean Joseph Antoine de Courvoisier, magistrate and politician (died 1835).
- 10 December – Jacques-Antoine Manuel, politician and orator (died 1827).
- 16 December – François-Adrien Boieldieu, composer (died 1834).

=== Full date unknown ===
- Charles Berny d'Ouvillé, miniaturist (died 1842).

== Deaths ==
=== January to June ===
- 5 March – Dormont de Belloy, actor/playwright (born 1727)
- 27 May – Louise Élisabeth de Bourbon (born 1693)

=== July to December ===
- 6 September – Jean-Baptiste Bullet, scholar (born 1699)
- 26 October – Pierre-Edmé Babel, engraver (born 1720)
- 1 November – Pierre-Joseph Bernard, poet (born 1708)
- 6 November – Guillaume de Barrême de Châteaufort, painter (born 1719)

=== Full date unknown ===
- Nicolas La Grange, playwright and translator (born 1707)

== In literature ==
- The historical fiction A Tale of Two Cities (1859) by English novelist Charles Dickens opens in this year ("It was the best of times; it was the worst of times"); it is the story of London and Paris leading up to the French Revolution.
