= 1939 in France =

- Decades: 1910s; 1920s; 1930s; 1940s; 1950s
- See also: History of France; Timeline of French history; List of years in France

Events from the year 1939 in France.

== Incumbents ==
- President: Albert Lebrun
- President of the Council of Ministers: Édouard Daladier

== Events ==
- 7 January – Physicist Marguerite Perey identifies francium, the last chemical element first discovered in nature.
- 26 January – Foreign Minister Georges Bonnet, in response to rumours (which are true) that he is seeking to end the French alliance system in Eastern Europe, gives a speech in Paris highlighting his government's commitment to the cordon sanitaire.
- 6 February
  - British Prime Minister Neville Chamberlain states in Parliament that any German attack on France will be automatically considered an attack on Britain.
  - In a response to Bonnet's speech of 26 January, German Foreign Minister Joachim von Ribbentrop, referring to Bonnet's alleged statement of December 6, 1938, accepting Eastern Europe as being in Germany's exclusive sphere of influence, protests that all French security commitments in that region are "now off limits".
- 27 February – France and the United Kingdom recognize Franco's government in Spain.
- 20 March – At an emergency meeting in London to deal with the Romanian crisis, Bonnet suggests to Lord Halifax that the ideal state for saving Romania from a German attack is Poland.
- 14 April – Bonnet meets in Paris with Soviet Ambassador Jakob Suritz, and suggests that a "peace front" comprising France, the Soviet Union, Great Britain, Poland and Romania would deter Germany from war.
- 3 June – The Soviet government offers its definition of what constitutes "aggression", upon which the projected Anglo-Soviet-French alliance would come into effect; France accepts this definition at once.
- 17 June – Last public guillotining in France – of 6-times murderer Eugen Weidmann at Versailles.
- 21 June – Francis Poulenc's Organ Concerto is premièred in Paris.
- 23 June – Talks are completed in Ankara (Turkey) between French Ambassador René Massigli and Turkish Foreign Minister Şükrü Saracoğlu, resolving the Hatay dispute in Turkey's favor.
- 24 August – The French government advises the last French private citizens in Germany to leave.
- 26 August – Mobilization begins.
- 28 August – Ocean liner SS Normandie heads into New York Harbor, where she will be interned on 3 September, and cut up for scrap, beginning in 1946.
- 1 September – Invasion of Poland by Nazi Germany. France and Britain deliver ultimatums to Germany and France declares full mobilization.
- 3 September – French declaration of war on Germany by Prime Minister Édouard Daladier, thus entering World War II (along with the United Kingdom and Commonwealth realms).
- 7 September – France opens the Saar Offensive.
- 10 September – The first troop convoy of the British Expeditionary Force to arrive in France disembarks in Cherbourg.
- 12 September – Anglo-French Supreme War Council first meets, at Abbeville (the Abbeville Conference) with the French delegation headed by Prime Minister Daladier.

== Sport ==
- 10 July – Tour de France begins.
- 30 July – Tour de France ends, won by Sylvère Maes of Belgium.

== Births ==
- 1 February – Claude François, singer-songwriter (died 1978)
- 29 March – Roland E. Arnall, businessman and diplomat in the United States (died 2008)
- 3 April – François de Roubaix, film score composer (died 1975)
- 9 May – Pierre Desproges, humorist (died 1988)
- 24 June – Brigitte Fontaine, singer, writer and poet
- 22 July – Warda Al-Jazairia, born Warda Mohammed Ftouki, singer (died 2012 in Egypt)
- 31 July – France Nuyen, actress
- 9 August – Bulle Ogier, actress
- 30 September – Jean-Marie Lehn, chemist, shared Nobel Prize in Chemistry in 1987
- 6 November – Maurice Bourgue (died 2023)
- 30 December – Odile Bailleux, harpsichordist and organist (died 2024)

== Deaths ==
- 23 February – Jules-Felix Coutan, sculptor (born 1848)
- 29 March – Henri Bénard, physicist (born 1874)
- 5 April – Clémentine Delait, bearded lady (born 1865)
- 16 September – Otto Wels, German politician (born 1873)
- 14 October – Polaire (Emilie Marie Bouchaud), singer and actress (born 1874)
- 5 November – Charles Barrois, geologist and palaeontologist (born 1851)

== See also ==
- List of French films of 1939
