= 1324 in France =

- Decades: 1300s; 1310s; 1320s; 1330s; 1340s
- See also: History of France; Timeline of French history; List of years in France

Events from the year 1324 in France

== Incumbents ==
- Monarch – Charles IV

== Events ==
- January 23 – England's envoy to France, Ralph Basset, and Raymond-Bernard de Montpezat, decline to obey an order to appear before King Charles IV of France to answer for the October 16 burning of Saint-Sardos. King Charles orders their properties forfeited to the crown.
- March 26 – Marie of Luxembourg, Queen of France, dies of injuries after falling from a carriage while she and King Charles IV of France were riding from Paris and Avignon. After she fell, she had gone into labor and given birth prematurely to a son, who died shortly afterward.
- May 3 – France's Consistori del Gay Saber holds its first annual contest to determine the best poet in the Kingdom. Arnaut Vidal de Castelnou d'Ari wins the first prize, the violeta d'aur. The contest continues for 160 years, ceasing in 1484. (Note: For a full list of laureates (1324–1694) with the flowers awarded and winning works, see Gélis 1912, p. 285.)
- June 13 – King Edward II of England dispatches his envoy, Aymer de Valence, 2nd Earl of Pembroke to France in an attempt to negotiate a peaceful end to the Saint-Sardos incident. Stopping at Saint-Riquier 10 days later, Pembroke dies of a heart attack before reaching Paris.
- June 24 – King Charles IV of France issues an order declaring the Duchy of Aquitaine, French territory ruled by King Edward II of England, forfeited to the crown. The move comes after King Edward fails to render homage, as Duke of Aquitaine, to King Charles. A French army of 7,000 men is massed at the border of Aquitaine for an invasion.
- July 5 – A royal wedding takes place in France as King Charles IV marries his cousin Joan of Évreux, the 14-year-old daughter of his uncle, Louis, Count of Évreux.
- September 11 – When the body of King Sancho of Majorca arrives in the French city of Perpignan for interment at the Perpignan Cathedral, a mob attacks the funeral procession and steals valuables that had accompanied the corpse.
- September 22 – The War of Saint-Sardos ends after Charles, Count of Valois forces the surrender of Edmund of Woodstock, 1st Earl of Kent at La Réole, the last English fortress at the Duchy of Aquitaine. A six-month truce follows

=== Date unknown ===
- Artist Jean Pucelle is commissioned to make a book of hours, known as the Hours of Jeanne d'Evreux, by Joan of Évreux probably as a gift from her husband King Charles IV of France between 1324 and 1328.
- The Gothic sculpture Virgin of Jeanne d'Evreux was created sometime between the years 1324 and 1339.

== Births ==
=== Date unknown ===
- William the Rich, Marquis of Namur, French nobleman and ruler (d. 1391)

== Deaths ==
- March 26 – Marie of Luxembourg, Queen of France (b. 1304)
- March – Louis of France, second son of Charles IV of France and Marie of Luxembourg (b. 1324)
- June 23 – Aymer de Valence, 2nd Earl of Pembroke (c. 1270)

== Sources ==
- Gélis, François de (1912). Histoire critique des jeux floraux depuis leur origine jusqu'à leur transformation en Académie (1323-1694) (in French). p. 285.
