= 1936 in France =

- Decades: 1910s; 1920s; 1930s; 1940s; 1950s
- See also: History of France; Timeline of French history; List of years in France

Events from the year 1936 in France.

== Incumbents ==
- President: Albert Lebrun
- President of the Council of Ministers:
  - until 24 January: Pierre Laval
  - 24 January-4 June: Albert Sarraut
  - starting 4 June: Léon Blum

== Events ==
- 25 March – Second London Naval Treaty is signed by the governments of France, the United Kingdom, and the United States of America.
- 26 April – first round of Legislative Election held.
- 3 May – second round of Legislative Election held, resulting in the election of the Popular Front.
- 26 May – A general strike is initiated in Le Havre.
- 7 June – Matignon Agreements are signed between the Confédération générale de la production française (CGPF) employers association, the CGT trade union and the French state during a general strike initiated after the election of the Popular Front.

== Sport ==
- 7 July – Tour de France begins.
- 2 August – Tour de France ends, won by Sylvère Maes of Belgium.

== Births ==
- 10 February – Marie-Josèphe Sublet, politician (died 2024)
- 15 February – Jean-Gabriel Albicocco, film director (died 2001)
- 23 February – Roger Rivière, cyclist (died 1976)
- 12 April – Jean-Claude Vrinat, restaurateur (died 2008)
- 1 March – Jean-Edern Hallier, author (died 1997)
- 7 March – Georges Perec, novelist, filmmaker and essayist (died 1982)
- 1 May – Danièle Huillet, filmmaker (died 2006)
- 11 May – Daniel Costelle, documentary maker and film director (died 2026)
- 17 May – Guy Camberabero, rugby union player (died 2023)
- 20 June – Jean-Daniel Pollet, film director and screenwriter (died 2004)
- 1 August – Yves Saint Laurent, fashion designer (died 2008)
- 4 August – Claude Ballot-Léna, motor racing driver (died 1999)
- 12 October – Pascale Audret, actress (died 2000)
- 28 December – Jacques Mesrine, gangster (died 1979)

== Deaths ==
- 7 January – Guy d'Hardelot, composer, pianist and teacher (born 1858)
- 5 February – Charles le Bargy, actor and film director (born 1858)
- 28 February – Charles Nicolle, bacteriologist who won the 1928 Nobel Prize in Medicine (born 1866)
- 16 March – Marguerite Durand, actress, journalist and suffragette (born 1864)
- 23 May – Henri de Régnier, poet (born 1864)
- 13 June – Marie-Louise Bouglé, feminist, librarian, and archivist (born 1883)
- 15 July – Charles Binet, Archbishop of Besançon and cardinal (born 1869)
- 1 August – Louis Blériot, inventor, engineer and aviation pioneer (born 1872)
- 23 August – Juliette Adam, writer (born 1836)
- 17 October – Suzanne Bianchetti, actress (born 1889)

=== Full date unknown ===
- Georges Garnier, soccer player (born 1878)

== See also ==
- List of French films of 1936
- Interwar France
