= 1798 in France =

- Decades: 1770s; 1780s; 1790s; 1800s; 1810s
- See also: History of France; Timeline of French history; List of years in France

Events from the year 1798 in France.

== Incumbents ==
- The French Directory

== Events ==
- 10 February - The Papacy is removed from power by the French General Louis Alexandre Berthier.
- 7 March - French forces invade the Papal States and establish the Roman Republic.
- 26 April - France annexes Geneva.
- 12 June - French take Malta.
- 1 July - Napoleon's troops land in Egypt.
- 7 July - The United States Congress rescinds treaties with France, sparking the Quasi-War.
- 12 July - Battle of Chobrakit: French victory over the Mamelukes.
- 21 July - Battle of the Pyramids: Decisive French victory over local Mamluk forces.
- 24 July - Napoleon occupies Cairo.
- 1-2 August - Battle of the Nile (near Abu Qir): The British Royal Navy under Lord Nelson defeats the French navy under Admiral Brueys. 11 of the 13 French battleships are captured or destroyed, including the flagship Orient whose magazine explodes.
- 22 August - French troops land at Kilcummin in County Mayo to assist the Irish rebellion.
- 7 September - French force crosses the River Shannon at Ballintra.
- 8 September - Battle of Ballinamuck, French defeat and surrender.
- 16 September - Further French force of 3,000 men depart Brest for Ireland.
- 12 October
  - Battle of Tory Island: British naval victory prevents landing of further French troops in Ireland.
  - Peasants' War begins against French occupation of the Southern Netherlands.
- 5 December - Peasant's War ends with French victory.

== Births ==
- 17 January - Auguste Comte, philosopher (died 1857)
- 5 February - Olympe-Philippe Gerbet, Roman Catholic Bishop and writer (died 1864)
- 10 March - Pierre Frédéric Sarrus, mathematician (died 1861)
- 1 April - Jean-Baptiste Glaire, Roman Catholic priest and Hebrew and Biblical scholar (died 1879)
- 17 April - Étienne Bobillier, mathematician (died 1840)
- 26 April - Eugène Delacroix, painter (died 1863)
- 3 May - Célestine Guynemer de la Hailandière, Roman Catholic Archbishop of Indianapolis (died 1882)
- 9 August - Louis-Florentin Calmeil, psychiatrist and medical historian (died 1895)
- 2 October - Théodore Guérin (Saint Theodora), missionary (died 1856)
- 8 October - Philarète Chasles, critic and man of letters (died 1873)
- 28 October - Hippolyte François Jaubert, politician and botanist (died 1874)
- 21 November - Jérôme-Adolphe Blanqui, economist (died 1854)
- 2 December - Philippe-Frédéric Blandin, physician and surgeon (died 1849)
- 4 December - Jules Armand Dufaure, statesman (died 1881)
- 8 December - Antoine Laurent Dantan, sculptor (died 1878)

=== Full date unknown ===
- Jacques Bernard Hombron, naval surgeon and naturalist (died 1852)

== Deaths ==
- 25 February - Louis-Jules Mancini-Mazarini, Duc de Nivernais, diplomat and writer (born 1716)
- 25 March - Michel Joachim Marie Raymond, General (born 1755)
- 6 July - Adrien Duport, politician (born 1759)
- 1 August
  - François-Paul Brueys d'Aigalliers, Rear-Admiral (born 1753)
  - Luc-Julien-Joseph Casabianca, Naval officer (born 1762)
- 2 August - Aristide Aubert Du Petit Thouars, Naval officer (born 1760)
- 27 August - Louis Joseph Watteau, painter (born 1731)
- October - Jean Guillaume Bruguière, physician, zoologist and diplomat (b. c1749)
- 30 December - Anne-Pierre, marquis de Montesquiou-Fézensac, General and writer (born 1739)
