= 1779 in France =

- Decades: 1750s; 1760s; 1770s; 1780s; 1790s
- See also: History of France; Timeline of French history; List of years in France

Events in the year 1779 in France.

== Incumbents ==
- Monarch: Louis XVI

== Events ==
- 12 April - Treaty of Aranjuez (1779)
- June–September - Armada of 1779
- 2-4 July - Capture of Grenada (1779)
- 6 July - Battle of Grenada
- 6 October - Action of 6 October 1779

== Births ==
- 7 October - Louis Charles, Count of Beaujolais, younger brother of King Louis-Philippe I of the French
