= 1783 in France =

- Decades: 1760s; 1770s; 1780s; 1790s; 1800s
- See also: History of France; Timeline of French history; List of years in France

Events from the year 1783 in France.

== Incumbents ==
- Monarch – Louis XVI

== Events ==
- 3 September Treaty of Paris
- 21 November First manned hot air balloon flight

== Births ==
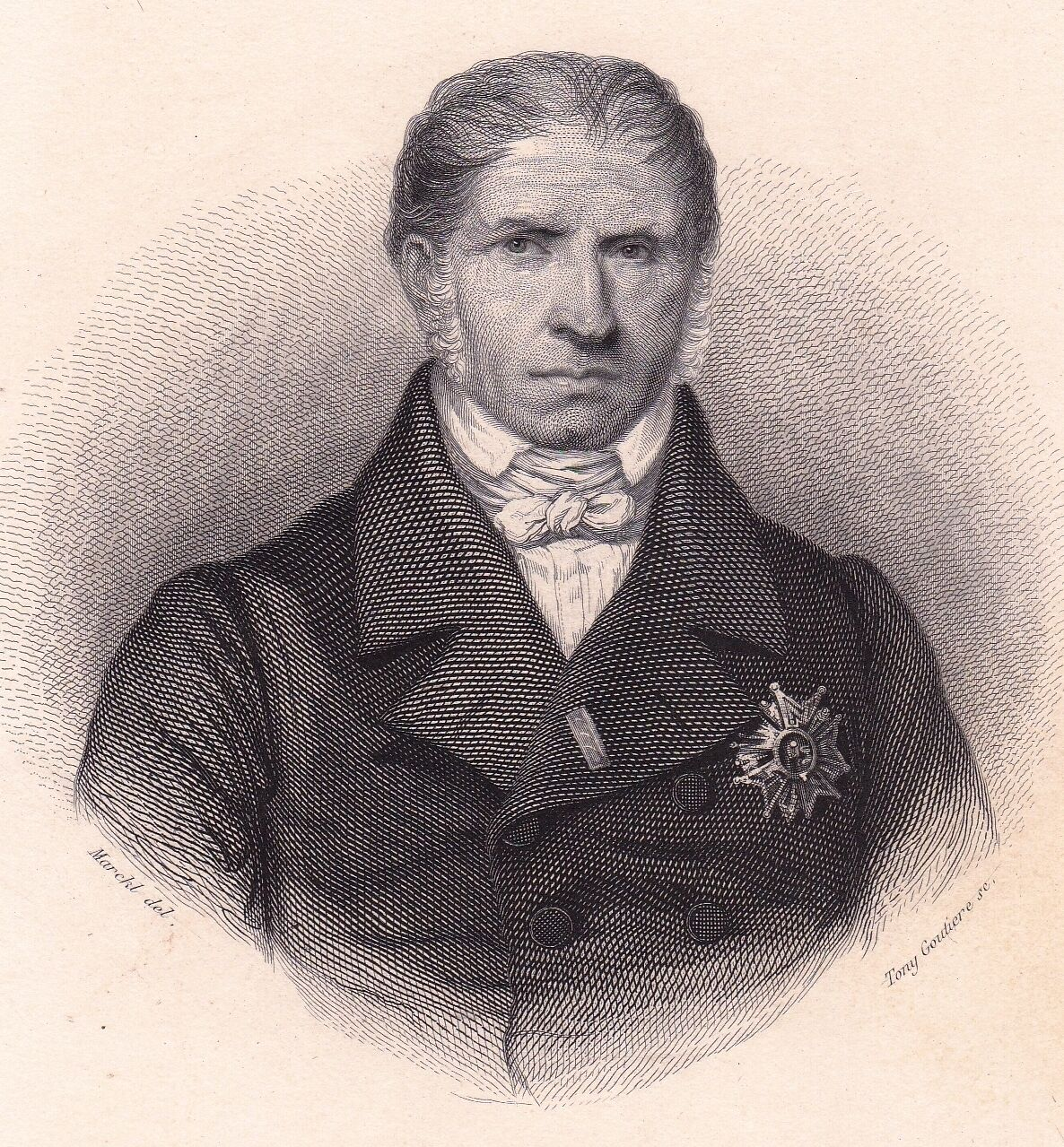
André Dupin.

- 1 February – André Marie Jean Jacques Dupin, lawyer and politician (died 1865)
- 5 July – Charles-Louis Havas, writer and founder of Agence France-Presse (died 1858).
- 24 July – Frédéric de Lafresnaye, ornithologist (died 1861).
- 19 December – Charles Julien Brianchon, mathematician and chemist (died 1864).

== Deaths ==
- 27 September – Étienne Bézout, mathematician (born 1730)
- 5 December – Sophie d'Artois, princess (born 1776)
- Marguerite Gourdan, brothel madam (born year unknown)
