= 1801 in France =

- Decades: 1780s; 1790s; 1800s; 1810s; 1820s
- See also: History of France; Timeline of French history; List of years in France

Events from the year 1801 in France.

== Incumbents ==
- The French Consulate

== Events ==
- 9 February – Treaty of Lunéville signed between the French First Republic and the Holy Roman Empire, ending the war with Austria.
- 8 March – Battle of Abukir, second battle of the Egyptian campaign. British victory.
- 18 March – Treaty of Florence signed between France and the Kingdom of Naples.
- 21 March - Treaty of Aranjuez signed between France and Spain.
- 21 March - Battle of Alexandria. British victory.
- 8 July – First Battle of Algeciras Bay. Franco-Spanish victory.
- 12 July – Second Battle of Algeciras Bay. British victory.
- 15 July – Concordat of 1801, agreement signed between France and Pope Pius VII that reaffirms the Roman Catholic Church as the majority church of France and restores some of its civil status.
- 17 August – Siege of Alexandria by the British begins.
- 2 September – Siege of Alexandria ends in British victory.
- 29 September – Treaty of Madrid signed between John VI of Portugal and France.
- September – Metric system obligatory throughout France.
- First census in France.
- Joseph Marie Jacquard develops a loom where the pattern being woven is controlled by punched cards.

== Births ==
- 14 January – Adolphe-Théodore Brongniart, botanist (died 1876)
- 1 February – Émile Littré, lexicographer and philosopher (died 1881)
- 6 February – Laure Cinti-Damoreau, soprano (died 1863)
- 22 February – Marc Girardin, politician and man of letters (died 1873)
- 11 March – Frédéric Berat, poet and songwriter (died 1855)
- 8 April – Eugène Burnouf, orientalist (died 1852)
- 24 April – Marthe Camille Bachasson, Count of Montalivet, statesman and Peer of France (died 1880)
- 30 April – André Giroux, photographer and painter (died 1879)
- 11 May – Henri Labrouste, architect (died 1875)
- 15 May – Joseph Jean Baptiste Xavier Fournet, geologist and metallurgist (died 1869)
- 30 June – Frédéric Bastiat, writer and political economist (died 1850)
- 23 July – Charles Rohault de Fleury, architect (died 1875)
- 28 August – Antoine Augustin Cournot, economist, philosopher and mathematician (died 1877)
- 6 October – Hippolyte Carnot, statesman (died 1888)
- 27 December – Étienne Joseph Louis Garnier-Pagès, politician (died 1841)

=== Full date unknown ===
- Jean-Baptiste Honoré Raymond Capefigue, historian and biographer (died 1872)
- Carron du Villards, ophthalmologist (died 1860)
- Éléonore-Louis Godefroi Cavaignac, politician (died 1845)
- Amédée Fauré, painter (died 1878)

== Deaths ==
- 11 January – Charles Eugène Gabriel de La Croix, marquis de Castries, Marshal of France (born 1727)
- 9 February – Armand-Joseph Guffroy, politician (born 1742)
- 12 February – Jean Darcet, chemist and porcelain maker (born 1724)
- 2 March – Charles-Albert Demoustier, writer (born 1760)
- 7 April – Noël François de Wailly, grammarian and lexicographer (born 1724)
- 11 April – Antoine de Rivarol, writer and epigrammatist (born 1753)
- 8 June – Pierre Antoine Monneron, merchant, banker, writer and politician (born 1747)
- 6 July – Pierre Augustin Moncousu, naval officer (born 1756; killed in action at the First Battle of Algeciras)
- 7 September – Antoine de Sartine, statesman (born 1729)
- 3 October – Philippe Henri, marquis de Ségur, Marshal of France (born 1724)
- 29 November – François Macquard, Napoleonic general (born 1738)
- Honoré Blanc, gunsmith (born 1736)
- David Charpentier de Cossigny, Governor General of Pondicherry, Réunion and Mauritius (born 1740)
