= Léon Carcassonne =

Léon Carcassonne (died 7 May 1894 in Marseille) was a French physician, municipal councilor, and member of the Academy of Nîmes, the son of David Carcassonne. He was the author of the following works: (1) Questions sur Diverses Branches des Sciences Médicales, Paris, 1842; (2) Compte-Rendu des Travaux des Conseils d'Hygiène et de Salubrité Publique de Nîmes, a treatise on the work done by the health officers of Nîmes, Nîmes, 1866; (3) Notice sur Philippe Boileau de Castelnau, Nîmes, 1882.
