= 1373 in France =

- Decades: 1350s; 1360s; 1370s; 1380s; 1390s
- See also: History of France; Timeline of French history; List of years in France

Events from the year 1373 in France

== Incumbents ==
- Monarch – Charles V

== Events ==
- March 21 – The Battle of Chiset is fought at Chizé between English and French forces during the Hundred Years' War. The French had laid siege to the town and the English sent a relief force. The French, led by Bertrand du Guesclin, met the relief force and defeated it.
- April 28 – Hundred Years' War: The French re-capture most of Brittany from the English, but are unable to take Brest.
- August 9 – John of Gaunt's chevauchée of 1373: John of Gaunt, Duke of Lancaster, launches an English military raid of France. Despite the devastation caused by the raid over its five month period, it was a failure for the English crown because of the weak military and political results, and the enormous losses.
- September 9 – The French attack an isolated English corps at Oulchy, killing its captain Walter Hewitt and numerous men, and capturing several knights and squires, including Thomas Despenser, brother of the Constable of England Thomas of Woodstock, Duke of Gloucester.
- September 22 – The English arrived before Troyes, but are met by Constable of France Bertrand du Guesclin, Olivier V de Clisson, Louis II of Bourbon, the Duke of Burgundy and more than 7,000 men in garrison who had been waiting for them for a week. This prevented any English attempt to march on Paris through Gâtinais. The English left, around September 25.

== Births ==
- March 29 – Marie d'Alençon, French princess (d. 1417)

== Deaths ==
- November 3 – Joan of Valois, Queen of Navarre

=== Date unknown ===
- Robert le Coq, French bishop and councillor
