= Jean-Louis Alléon-Dulac =

French naturalist (1723–1788)

Jean-Louis Alléon-Dulac (1723–1788) was a French naturalist.

Jean-Louis Alléon-Dulac was born in Saint-Étienne, Loire, the son of an adviser of the king. He became a lawyer at the Parliament of Lyon between 1748 and 1765, Director of the post office, Warehouse keeper of tobacco and Receiver of the Lottery of Saint-Etienne, but is especially known as a naturalist. He wrote Mélange d'histoire naturelle (1754) and Mémoire pour servir à l'histoire naturelle des provinces de Lyonnais, Forez et Beaujolais, printed by Claude Cizeron at Lyon in 1765. In this last work, he gave a detailed description of the quarries and mines of these areas and one of the first figures of an ammonite. He was also the first to identify the belemnites as cephalopods. He died at Saint-Etienne.
