= 1776 in France =

- Decades: 1750s; 1760s; 1770s; 1780s; 1790s
- See also: History of France; Timeline of French history; List of years in France

Events from the year 1776 in France.

== Incumbents ==
- Monarch – Louis XVI

== Events ==
- June–July – Claude-François-Dorothée, marquis de Jouffroy d'Abbans, demonstrates his steamboat Palmipède on the Doubs (river).
- August – The guild organisation Marchandes de modes is founded.

== Births ==
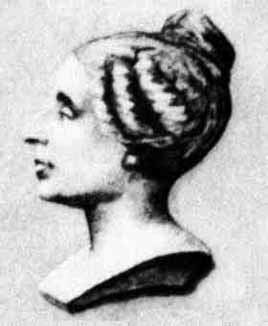
Marie-Sophie Germain. The Sophie Germain primes are named after her.

- 1 April – Sophie Germain, mathematician, physicist, and philosopher (died 1831)
- 4 August – Pierre-Simon Ballanche, writer and counterrevolutionary philosopher (died 1847)
- 27 March - Charles-François Brisseau de Mirbel, French batonist and politician (died 1854)
- 2 August - Louis François, Prince of Conti.

=== Full date unknown ===
- Peter Gilles, composer (died 1839)

== Deaths ==
- 4 May – Jacques Saly, sculptor (born 1717)
- 2 August - Louis François, Prince of Conti (born 1717)
- 25 August – Germain-François Poullain de Saint-Foix, writer and playwright (born 1698)
- 17 October – Pierre François le Courayer, writer (born 1681)
- 23 May - Julie de Lespinasse.

=== Full date unknown ===
- Augustin Roux, encyclopedist (born 1726)
- Marie Durand, Protestant martyr (d. 1711)
