= 1790 in France =

- Decades: 1770s; 1780s; 1790s; 1800s; 1810s
- See also: History of France; Timeline of French history; List of years in France

Events from the year 1790 in France.

== Incumbents ==
- Monarch: Louis XVI

== Events ==
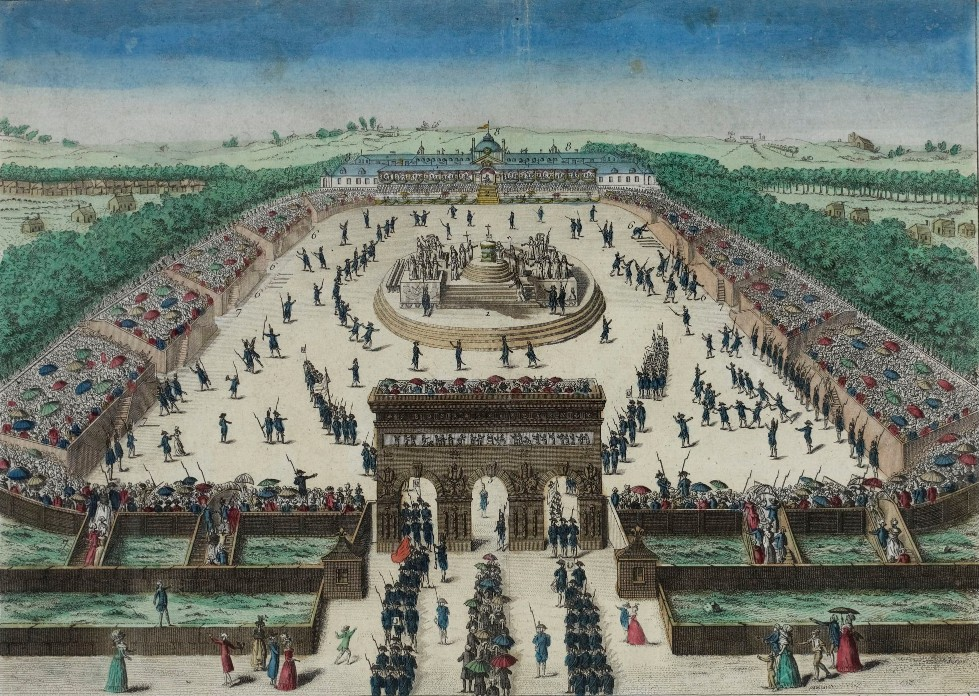
Fête de la Fédération (Musée de la Révolution française)

- 4 February - Louis XVI declares to the National Assembly that he will maintain the constitutional laws.
- 4 March - France is divided into 83 départements, which cut across the former provinces, in an attempt to dislodge regional loyalties based on noble ownership of land.
- July - Louis XVI accepts a constitutional monarchy.
- 12 July - The Civil Constitution of the Clergy law is passed.
- 14 July - The Fête de la Fédération is held.
- 31 August - Nancy affair.
- 4 September - Résignation of Jacques Necker.
- 24 October - Tricolour adopted as the flag of France by the Constituent Assembly.
- 24 November - The Constituent Assembly passes a law requiring all Roman Catholic priests to swear an oath of acceptance of the new Constitution.

== Births ==
- 6 March - Jacques Arago
- 1 April - Auguste Couder
- 9 June - Abel-François Villemain
- 29 July - Nicolas Martin du Nord
- 7 August - Jean-Claude Colin
- 21 October - Alphonse de Lamartine
- 10 November - Jean René Constant Quoy
- 27 November - Alexandre Ferdinand Parseval-Deschenes
- 6 December - Jean-Baptiste Philibert Vaillant
- 20 December - Jean Joseph Vaudechamp

== Deaths ==
- 6 May - Jacques Antoine Hippolyte, Comte de Guibert
- 24 May - François-Henri Clicquot
- 3 July - Jean-Baptiste L. Romé de l'Isle
- 17 October - André Désilles
