= Ambroise Roux-Alphéran =

French public official and historian

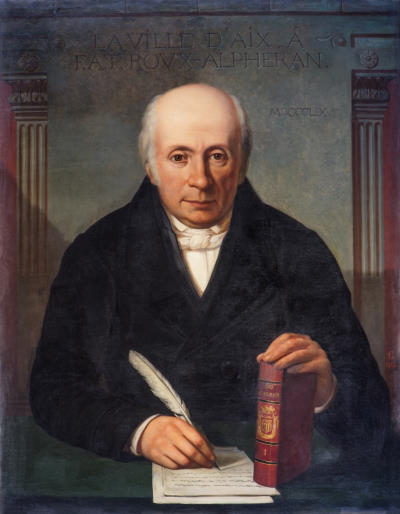
- Born: 29 December 1776; Aix-en-Provence
- Died: 8 February 1858 (aged 81); Aix-en-Provence
- Occupations: Historian; Public official

Ambroise Roux-Alphéran (French pronunciation: [ɑ̃bʁwaz ʁu alfeʁɑ̃]; 1776–1858) was a French public official and historian.

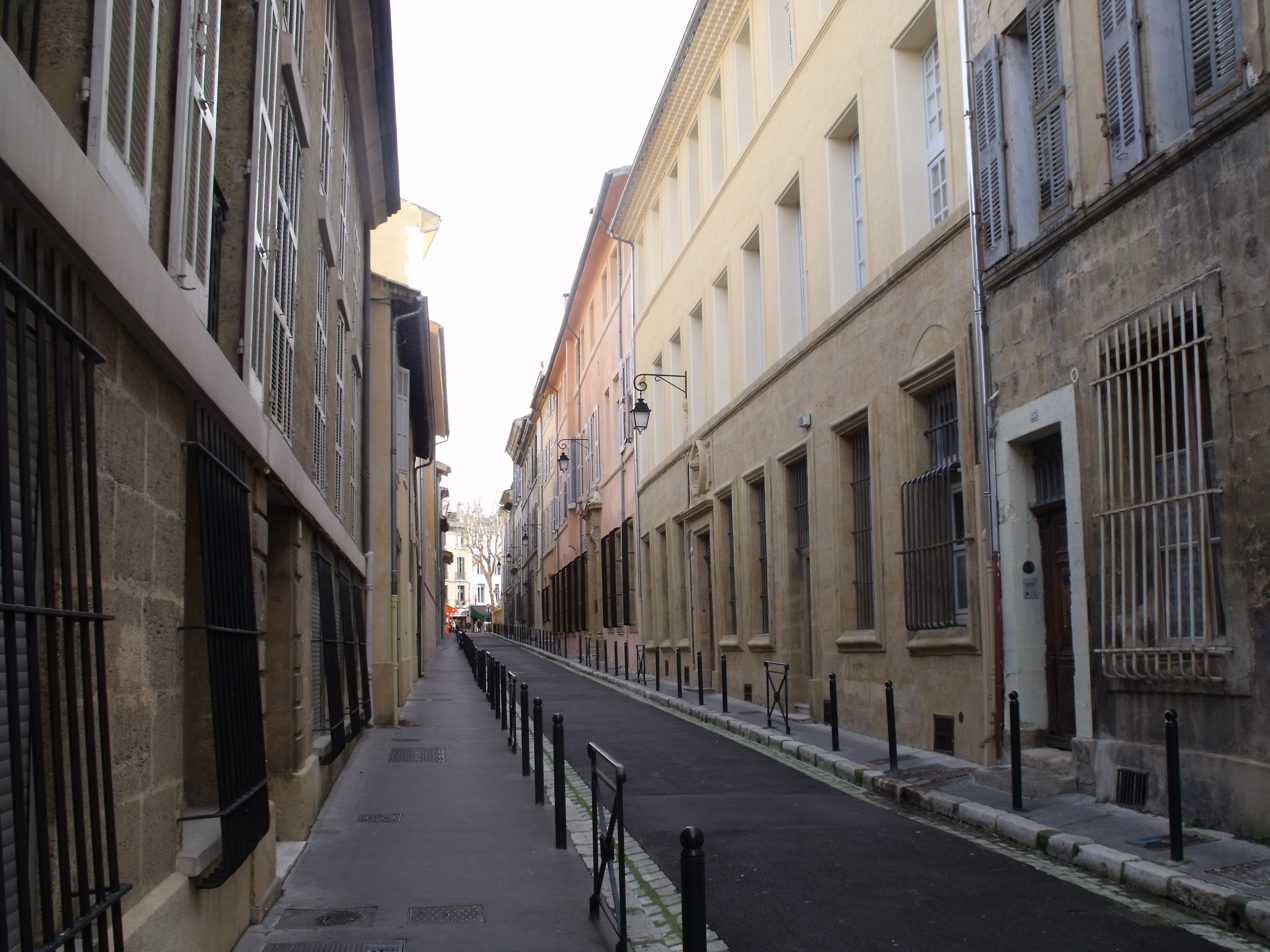
Rue Roux-Alphéran

== Biography ==
=== Early life ===
Ambroise(-Thomas) Roux-Alphéran was born on 29 December 1776 in Aix-en-Provence.

=== Career ===
He served as clerk of the court of Aix-en-Provence under the Restoration.

Later, he quit his job and decided to spend his time studying and writing about the history of Aix-en-Provence. His numerous works are kept in the Bibliothèque Méjanes, the public library in Aix.

=== Personal life ===
He resided at 9, rue Longue-Saint-Jean, which was subsequently renamed in his honour.

He died on 8 February 1858 in Aix-en-Provence.

== Works and themes ==
- Ambroise Roux-Alphéran, Les Rues d'Aix (Aubin, 1848).
