= 1781 in France =

- Decades: 1760s; 1770s; 1780s; 1790s; 1800s
- See also: History of France; Timeline of French history; List of years in France

Events from the year 1781 in France.

== Incumbents ==
- Monarch – Louis XVI

== Events ==
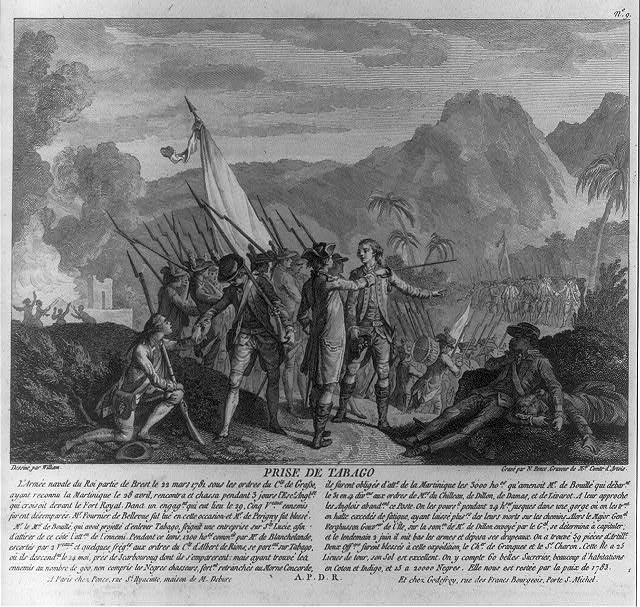
Depiction of the Invasion of Tobago

- 6 January – Battle of Jersey
- May – Invasion of Tobago
- 12 December – Battle of Ushant

== Science ==
- Messier 87, a supergiant elliptical galaxy, was discovered by French astronomer Charles Messier.

== Births ==
- 27 March – Charles Joseph Minard, engineer (died 1870)
- 1 May – François-Désiré Breton, naval officer

== Deaths ==
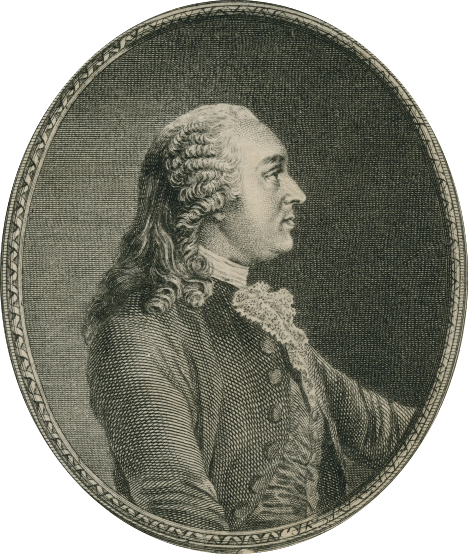
Anne Robert Jacques Turgot, Baron de Laune

- 18 March – Anne Robert Jacques Turgot, Baron de Laune, statesman (born 1727)
- 16 August – Charles-François de Broglie, marquis de Ruffec, soldier and diplomat (born 1719)
- 12 December – Christophe de Beaumont, archbishop (born 1703)
