= 1787 in France =

- Decades: 1760s; 1770s; 1780s; 1790s; 1800s
- See also: History of France; Timeline of French history; List of years in France

Events from the year 1787 in France.

== Incumbents ==
- Monarch: Louis XVI

== Events ==
=== February ===
- 22 February - The Assembly of Notables is held

=== November ===
- 7 November - Louis XVI signs the Edict of Versailles, giving religious freedom to non-Catholics in France.
- 21 November - The Treaty of Versailles (1787) is signed between Louis XVI and the Vietnamese prince Nguyễn Ánh.

== Births ==
- 24 January - Christophe-Paulin de La Poix de Fréminville
- 2 February - Charles Etienne Boniface
- 8 February - Théodore Basset de Jolimont
- 2 May - Martial de Guernon-Ranville
- 1 August - Edmond de Talleyrand-Périgord
- 15 August - Francois Sudre

== Deaths ==
- 13 February - Charles Gravier, comte de Vergennes
