= David Carcassonne =

French physician (1789–1861)

David Carcassonne (20 December 1789 – 15 November 1861 in Nîmes) was a French medical doctor. He was born at Remoulins, a small town in the Gard department, the son of a purveyor to the army of Napoleon I. Having joined the Grande Armée as military surgeon at twenty-three years of age, he followed the emperor to Russia in 1812, and was made a prisoner there. On his return to Nîmes, where his parents had settled, Carcassonne gave up his practise and became a carpet-manufacturer. He was a member of the Municipal Council of Nîmes, under King Louis-Philippe (1837-48). Carcassonne was the author of a work entitled Essai Historique sur la Médecine des Hébreux Anciens et Modernes (Montpellier-Nîmes, 1815).

His son Léon was also a French physician and municipal councilor.
