= Louis Marie de la Haye, Vicomte de Cormenin =

French politician and lawyer (1788–1868)

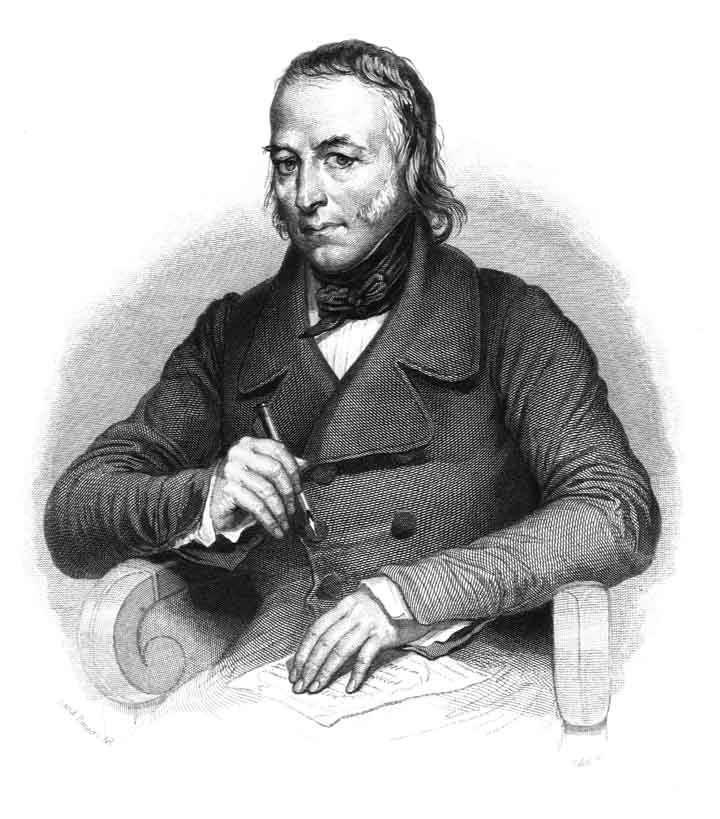
Cormenin

Louis Marie de la Haye, Vicomte de Cormenin (January 6, 1788 in Paris – May 6, 1868 in Paris) was a French jurist and political pamphleteer.

== Biography ==
=== Early life and career ===
His father and his grandfather both held the rank of lieutenant-general of the admiralty. At the age of twenty he was received advocate, and about the same time he gained some reputation as a writer of piquant and delicate poems.

In 1810 he received from Napoleon I the appointment of auditor to the council of state; and after the restoration of the Bourbons he became master of requests. During the period of his connection with the council he devoted himself zealously to the study of administrative law. He was selected to prepare some of the most important reports of the council. Among his separate publications at this time are noted, Du conseil d'état envisagé comme conseil et comme juridiction dans notre monarchie constitutionnelle (1818), and De la responsabilité des agents du gouvernement. In the former he claimed, for the protection of the rights of private persons in the administration of justice, the institution of a special court whose members should be irremovable, the right of oral defence, and publicity of trial. In 1822 appeared his Questions de droit administratif, in which he for the first time brought together and gave scientific shape to the scattered elements of administrative law. These he arranged and stated clearly in the form of aphorisms, with logical deductions, establishing them by proofs drawn from the archives of the council of state. This is recognized as his most important work as a jurist. The fifth edition (1840) was thoroughly revised.

=== Political career ===
In 1828 Cormenin entered the Chamber of Deputies as member for Orléans, took his seat in the Left Center, and began a vigorous opposition to the government of Charles X. As he was not gifted with the qualifications of the orator, he seldom appeared at the tribune; but in the various committees he defended all forms of popular liberties, and at the same time delivered, in a series of powerful pamphlets, under the pseudonym of Timon, the most formidable blows against tyranny and all political and administrative abuses. After the revolution of July 1830, Cormenin was one of the 221 who signed the protest against the elevation of the Orléans dynasty to the throne; and he resigned both his office in the council of state and his seat in the chamber. He was, however, soon re-elected deputy, and now voted with the extreme Left.

The discussions on the budget in 1831 gave rise to the publication of his famous series of Lettres sur la liste civile, which in ten years ran through twenty-five editions. In the following year he was elected deputy for Belley. In 1834 he was elected by two arrondissements, and sat for Joigny, which he represented until 1846. In this year he lost his seat in consequence of the popular prejudice aroused against him by his trenchant pamphlet Oui et non (1845) against attacks on religious liberty, and a second entitled Feul Feul (1845), written in reply to those who demanded a retractation of the former. Sixty thousand copies were rapidly sold.

Cormenin was an earnest advocate of universal suffrage before the revolution of February 1848, and had remorselessly exposed the corrupt practices at elections in his pamphlet Ordre du jour sur la corruption électorale. After the revolution he was elected by four départments to the Constituent Assembly, and became one of its vice-presidents. He was also member and president of the constitutional commission, and for some time took a leading part in drawing up the republican constitution. But the disputes which broke out among the members led him to resign the presidency. He was soon after named member of the council of state and president of the comité du contentieux.

=== Literary career ===
It was at this period that he published two pamphlets Sur l'indépendance de l'Italie ("On Italian Independence"). After the coup d'état of December 2, 1851, Cormenin, who had undertaken the defence of Prince Louis Napoleon after his attempt at Strasbourg, accepted a place in the new council of state of the empire. Four years later, by imperial ordinance, he was made a member of the institute. One of the most characteristic works of Cormenin is the Livre des orateurs, a series of brilliant studies of the principal parliamentary orators of the restoration and the monarchy of July, the first edition of which appeared in 1838, and the eighteenth in 1860. In 1846 he published his Entretiens de village, which procured him the Montyon prize, and of which six editions were called for the same year. His last work was Le Droit de tonnage en Algérie (1860). He died at Paris, on 6 May 1868. Two volumes if his Reliquiae were printed in Paris in the same year.
