= 1780 in France =

- Decades: 1760s; 1770s; 1780s; 1790s; 1800s
- See also: History of France; Timeline of French history; List of years in France

Events from the year 1780 in France.

== Incumbents ==
- Monarch – Louis XVI

== Events ==
- 17 April – Battle of Martinique

== Births ==
- 6 August – Georges Humann, financier and politician (died 1842)

== Deaths ==
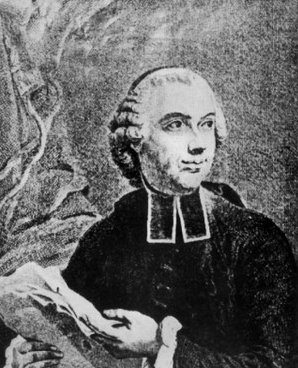
Étienne Bonnot de Condillac

- 25 January – André Levret, obstetrician (born 1703)
- 12 April – Camille, Prince of Marsan, nobleman and Prince of Lorraine (born 1725)
- 3 August – Étienne Bonnot de Condillac, philosopher (born 1715)
- 14 October – Pierre-Joseph Bourcet, tactician, general, chief of staff, mapmaker and military educator (born 1700)
- 16 November – Nicolas Joseph Laurent Gilbert, poet (born 1750)
- 15 December – Charles-Henri-Louis d'Arsac de Ternay, naval officer (born 1723)
