= 1937 in France =

- Decades: 1910s; 1920s; 1930s; 1940s; 1950s
- See also: History of France; Timeline of French history; List of years in France

Events from the year 1937 in France.

== Incumbents ==
- President: Albert Lebrun
- President of the Council of Ministers: Léon Blum (until 22 June), Camille Chautemps (starting 22 June)

== Events ==
- April – The arrival of a young male Kouprey and other animals from Indochina in the Vincennes Zoo.
- 1 May – General strike in Paris.
- 21 June – Coalition government of Léon Blum resigns.

== Sport ==
- 30 June – Tour de France begins.
- 25 July – Tour de France ends, won by Roger Lapébie.

== Births ==
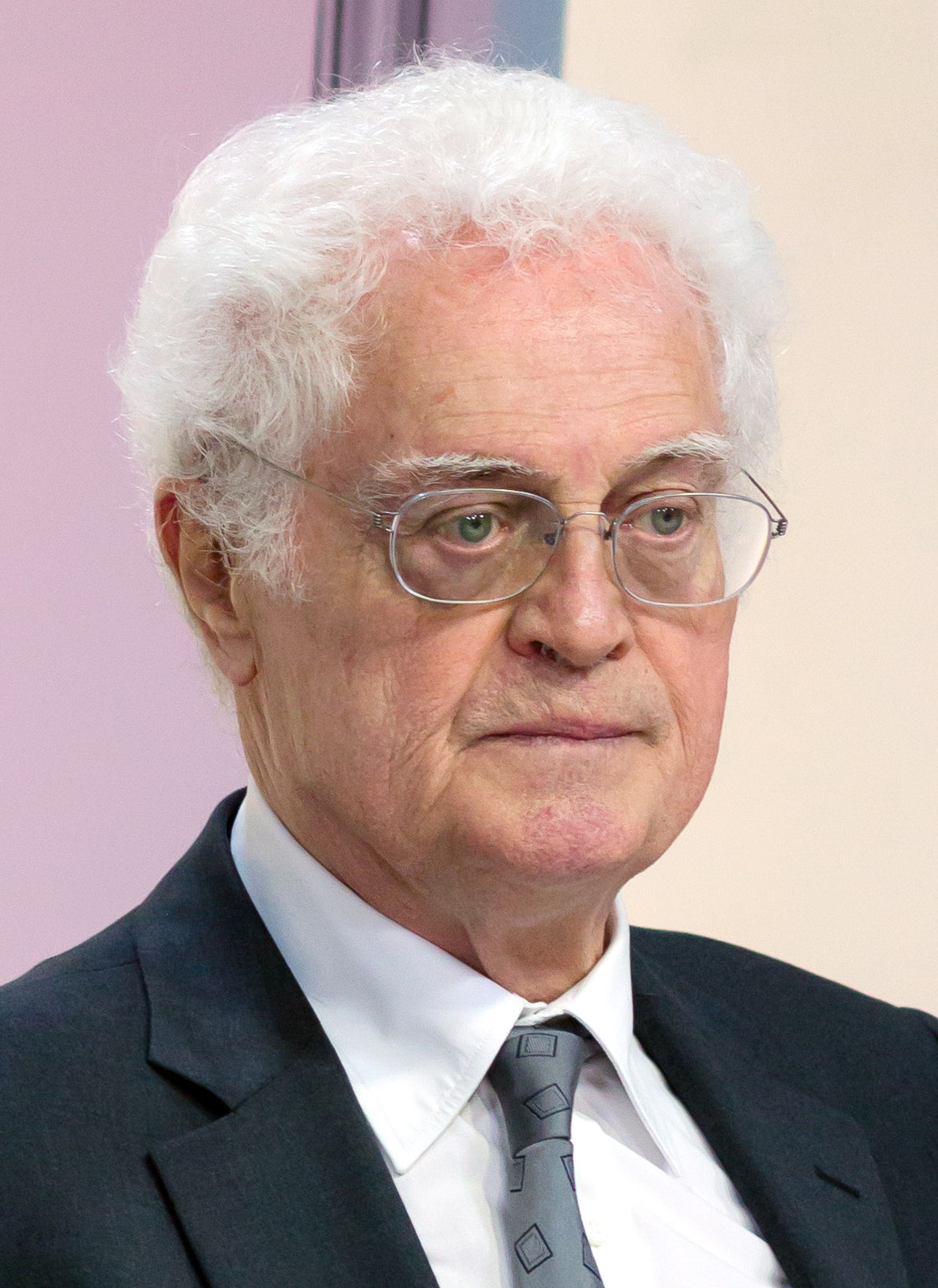
Lionel Jospin

- 21 January – François Boutin, Thoroughbred horse trainer (died 1995)
- 8 February – Françoise Claustre, archaeologist (died 2006)
- 13 February – Andrée Brunin, poet (died 1993)
- 4 March – Barney Wilen, saxophonist and jazz composer (died 1996)
- 8 March – André Aschieri, politician (died 2021)
- 21 March – François Bonlieu, Alpine skier and Olympic gold medallist (died 1973)
- 31 March – Claude Allègre, politician and scientist (died 2025)
- 6 May – Louis Besson, politician (died 2026)
- 12 May – Dominique Chaboche, politician and MEP (died 2005)
- 24 May – Maryvonne Dupureur, Olympic athlete (died 2008)
- 12 July – Lionel Jospin, Prime Minister of France (died 2026)
- 22 July
  - Jean-Claude Lebaube, road racing cyclist (died 1977)
  - Gilberte Marin-Moskovitz, politician (died 2019)
- 26 August – Nina Companeez, screenwriter and film director (died 2015)
- 15 September – Jean-Claude Decaux, advertising executive (died 2016)
- 31 October – Jean-Louis Servan-Schreiber, journalist (died 2020)
- 14 November – Marion Créhange, computer scientist (died 2022)

== Deaths ==
- 31 January – Marguerite Audoux, novelist (born 1863)
- 12 March – Charles-Marie Widor, organist and composer (born 1844)
- 16 March – Edith Clark, aviator and parachutist (born 1904)
- 18 March – Mel Bonis, composer (born 1858)
- 10 May – Paul Émile Chabas, painter (born 1869)
- 2 June – Louis Vierne, organist and composer (born 1870)
- 16 October – Jean de Brunhoff, writer and illustrator (born 1899)
- 28 December – Maurice Ravel, composer and pianist (born 1875)

== See also ==
- List of French films of 1937
