= 1938 in France =

- Decades: 1910s; 1920s; 1930s; 1940s; 1950s
- See also: History of France; Timeline of French history; List of years in France

Events from the year 1938 in France.

== Incumbents ==
- President: Albert Lebrun
- President of the Council of Ministers:
  - until 13 March: Camille Chautemps
  - 13 March-10 April: Léon Blum
  - starting 10 April: Édouard Daladier

== Events ==
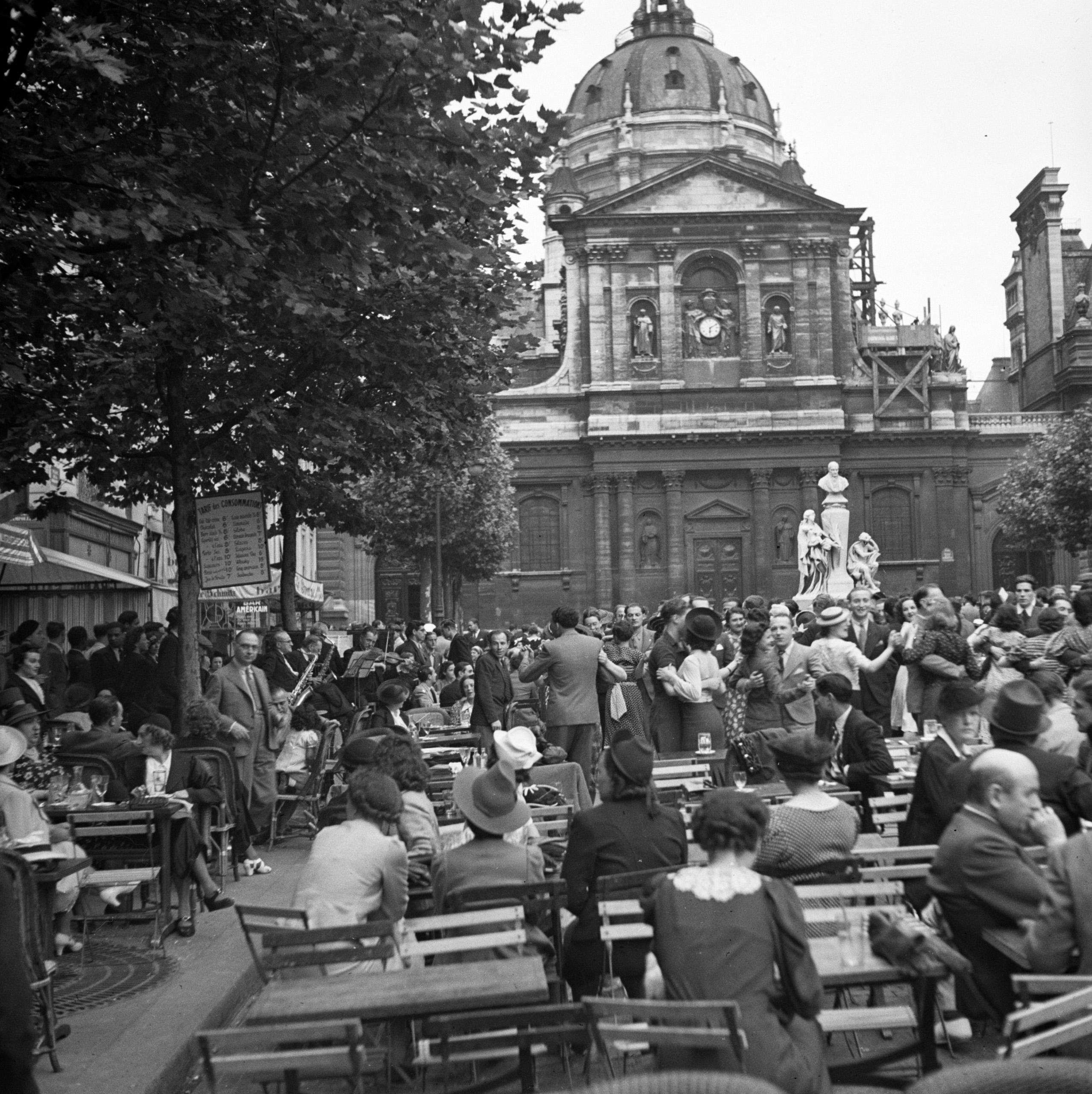
1938 Paris

- 1 January – Creation of SNCF (Société Nationale des Chemins de fer Français), bringing the country's principal railway companies together under government control.
- 14 March – Premier Léon Blum reassures the Czechoslovak government that France will honor its treaty obligations to aid Czechoslovakia in event of German invasion.
- 10 April – Édouard Daladier becomes prime minister of France. He appoints as Foreign Minister Georges Bonnet, an advocate of appeasement.
- 4 September – During the ceremony marking the unveiling of a plaque at Pointe de Grave celebrating Franco-American friendship, American ambassador William Bullitt in a speech states, "France and the United States were united in war and peace".
- 27 September – Striking railway workers in Thiès, French West Africa are massacred by French colonial infantry and police.
- 30 September – Munich Agreement is signed by France, Germany, Britain and Italy permitting German annexation of Czechoslovakia's Sudetenland.
- 24 October – Foreign Minister Georges Bonnet carries out a major purge of the Ministry of Foreign Affairs, dismissing or exiling a number of anti-appeasement officials such as Pierre Comert and René Massigli.
- 12 November – Finance Minister Paul Reynaud brings into effect a series of laws aiming at improving French productivity (thus aiming to undo the economic weaknesses which led to Munich) and undoes most of the economic and social laws of the Popular Front.
- 25 November – Bonnet informs Léon Noël, the French ambassador to Poland, that France should find an excuse for terminating the 1921 Franco-Polish alliance.
- 30 November
  - A general strike is called by the French Communist Party to protest the laws of 12 November.
  - Benito Mussolini and his Foreign Minister Count Galeazzo Ciano order "spontaneous" demonstrations in the Italian Chamber of Deputies demanding that France cede Tunisia, Nice, Corsica and French Somaliland to Italy, beginning an acute crisis in Franco-Italian relations that lasts until March 1939.

== Sport ==
- 4 June – 1938 FIFA World Cup begins, hosted by France.
- 19 June – World Cup ends, won by Italy.
- 5 July – Tour de France begins.
- 31 July – Tour de France ends, won by Gino Bartali of Italy.

== Births ==
- 7 January – Roland Topor, illustrator, painter, writer and filmmaker (died 1997)
- 18 February – Louis-Marie Billé, cardinal (died 2002)
- 13 March – Jean-Claude Risset, composer (died 2016)
- 31 March – Charles Josselin, politician (died 2026)
- 13 April – Janine Rozier, politician
- 2 July – Marcel Artelesa, international soccer player (died 2016)
- 9 August – Michèle Girardon, actress (died 1975)
- 20 August – Alain Vivien, politician
- 3 September – Liliane Ackermann, community leader, writer, and lecturer (died 2007)
- 23 September – Jean-Claude Mézières, artist and illustrator (died 2022)
- 25 October – Claude Minière, essayist and poet
- 10 November – Claude Serre, cartoonist (died 1998)
- 30 November – Jean Eustache, filmmaker (died 1981)

=== Full date unknown ===
- Michel Pêcheux, philosopher (died 1983)

== Deaths ==
- 20 January – Émile Cohl, caricaturist, cartoonist and animator (born 1857)
- 21 January – Georges Méliès, filmmaker (born 1861)
- 13 May – Charles Édouard Guillaume, physicist, awarded Nobel Prize in Physics in 1920 (born 1861)
- 26 June – Abbie Pratt, golfer (born 1859)
- 4 July – Suzanne Lenglen, tennis player (born 1899)
- 17 July – Robert Wiene, German film director (born 1873)

== See also ==
- List of French films of 1938
