= 1778 in France =

- Decades: 1750s; 1760s; 1770s; 1780s; 1790s
- See also: History of France; Timeline of French history; List of years in France

Events from the year 1778 in France.

== Incumbents ==
- Monarch – Louis XVI

== Events ==
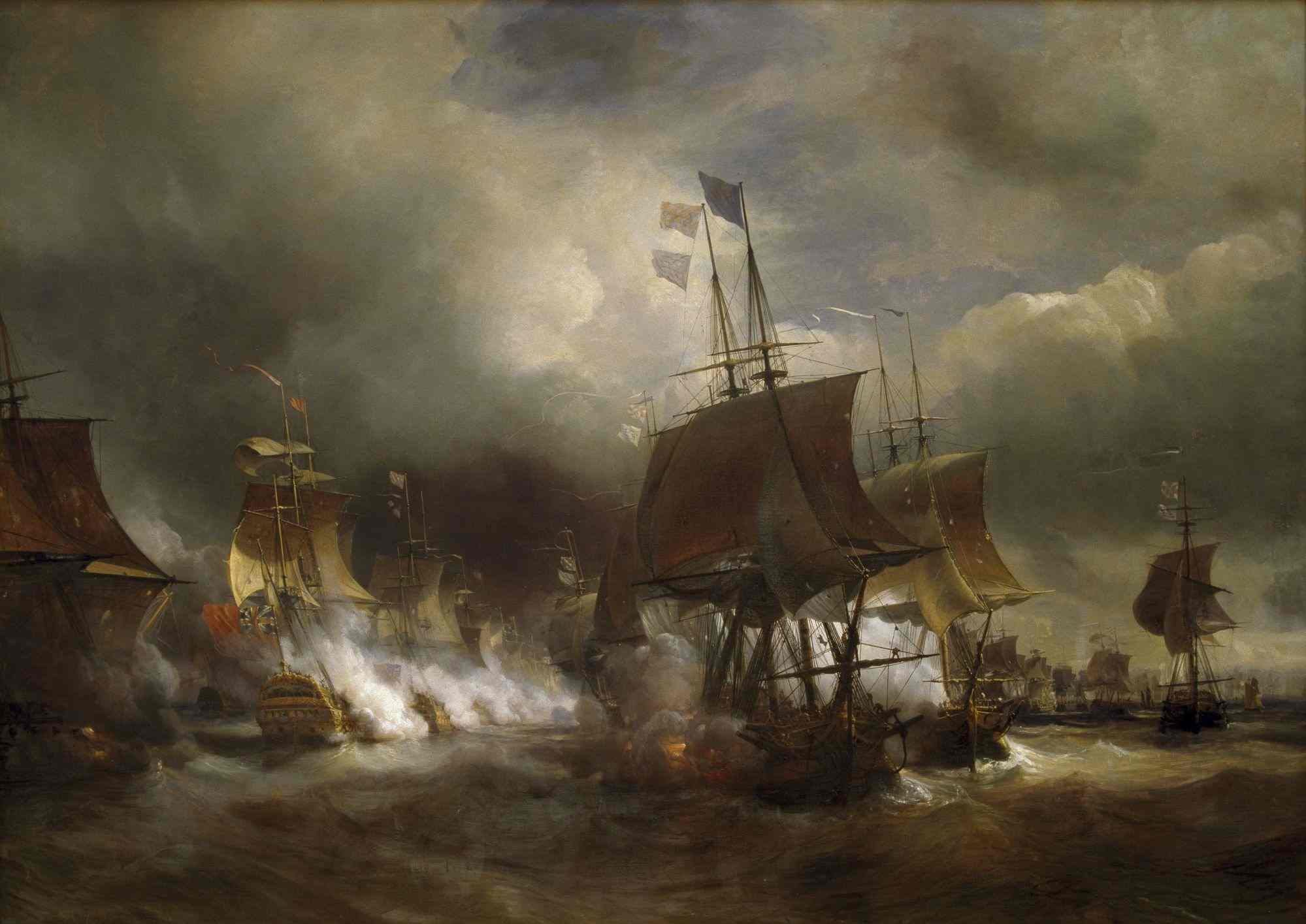
Depiction of the Battle of Ushant by Théodore Gudin

- 6 February – Treaty of Alliance
- 27 July – Battle of Ushant
- Société royale de médecine established by a decree of King Louis XVI.

== Births ==
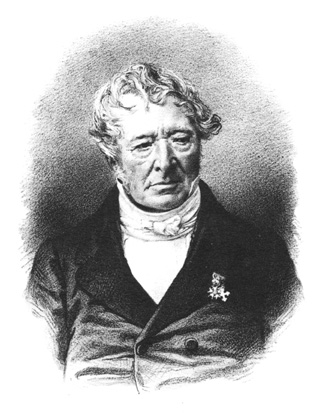
Jacques Joseph Champollion-Figeac

=== Full date missing ===
- Jacques Joseph Champollion-Figeac, archaeologist (died 1867)

== Deaths ==
- 9 January – Ladislas Ignace de Bercheny, Marshall of France (born 1689)
- 25 May – Jean-Baptiste Lemoyne, sculptor (born 1704)
- 30 May – Voltaire, writer, historian, and philosopher (born 1694)
- 20 June – Pierre Laclède, fur trader, founder of St. Louis (born 1729)
- 20 July – Élisabeth Duparc, soprano singer
- 3 August – François Alexandre Pierre de Garsault, botanist, zoologist and painter (born 1691)
- 5 August – Charles Clémencet, historian (born 1703)
- 28 September – Jean Girardet, painter (born 1709)
