= Auguste François Chomel =

French pathologist

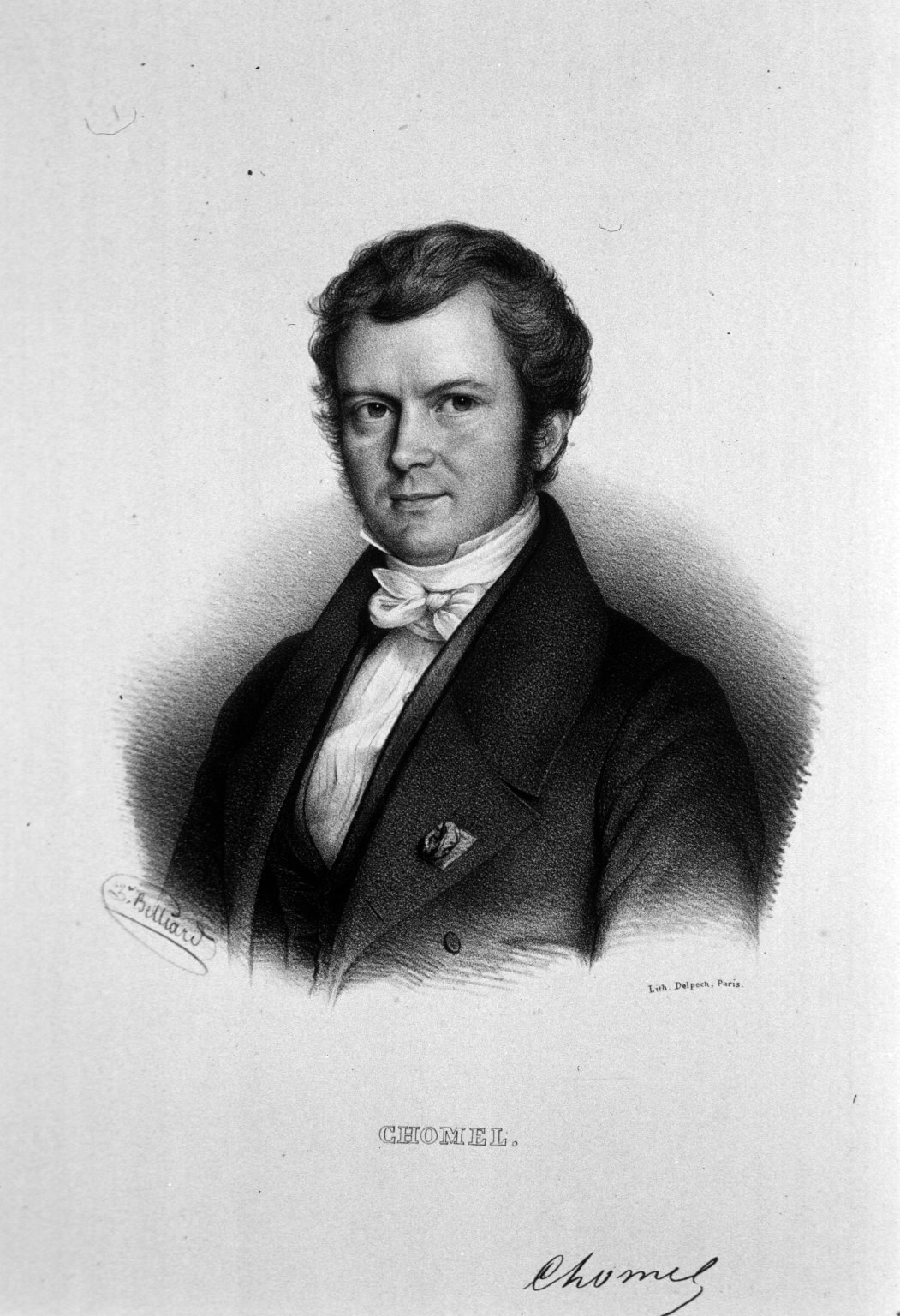
Auguste François Chomel, engraving by Zéphirin Belliard

Auguste François Chomel (13 April 1788 in Paris – 9 April 1858 in Morsang-sur-Orge) was a French pathologist.

== Biography ==
He was a professor at the Hôpital de la Charité in Paris, and in 1827 succeeded René Laennec (1781–1826) as chair of clinical medicine of the Faculté de Paris. In 1852 he declined swearing allegiance to Napoleon III, and thus was deemed having resigned his post.

Chomel was an important member of the pathological anatomy movement of early 19th century France that was based on the scientific research of Xavier Bichat (1771–1802), René Laënnec and Gaspard Laurent Bayle (1774–1816). In 1828 he provided the first description of a type of acute polyneuritis that would later be known as Guillain–Barré–Strohl syndrome.

Worthington Hooker (1806–1867), in his 1847 book Physician and Patient, gives Chomel credit for the first contemporary usage of the medical axiom, Primum non nocere ("First, do no harm").

== Works ==
=== Selection ===
- Éléments de pathologie générale (Elements of general pathology); numerous editions: 1817, 1840; on line : 4th ed., 1866.
- Des fièvres et des maladies pestilentielles (Fevers and pestilential diseases), 1821.
- Des dyspepsies (On dyspepsias), 1856. at Gallica
- Leçons de clinique (Clinical lessons), 1834–1840. at Gallica

=== List of online works ===
- Online works on Gallica

== Bibliography ==
- "Guillain–Barré–Strohl syndrome". Who Named It. Archived from the original on January 23, 2002.
