= 1784 in France =

- Decades: 1760s; 1770s; 1780s; 1790s; 1800s
- See also: History of France; Timeline of French history; List of years in France

Events from the year 1784 in France.

== Incumbents ==
- Monarch – Louis XVI

== Events ==
Science

- Royal Commission on Animal Magnetism appointed in Paris.

== Arts and culture ==
=== Opera ===
- 18 September – Dardanus, opera by Antonio Sacchini, was first performed at Versailles

=== Theatre ===
- Le Bon Père, comedy by Jean-Pierre Claris de Florian, first performed by the Comédie Italienne in Paris in 1784

== Births ==
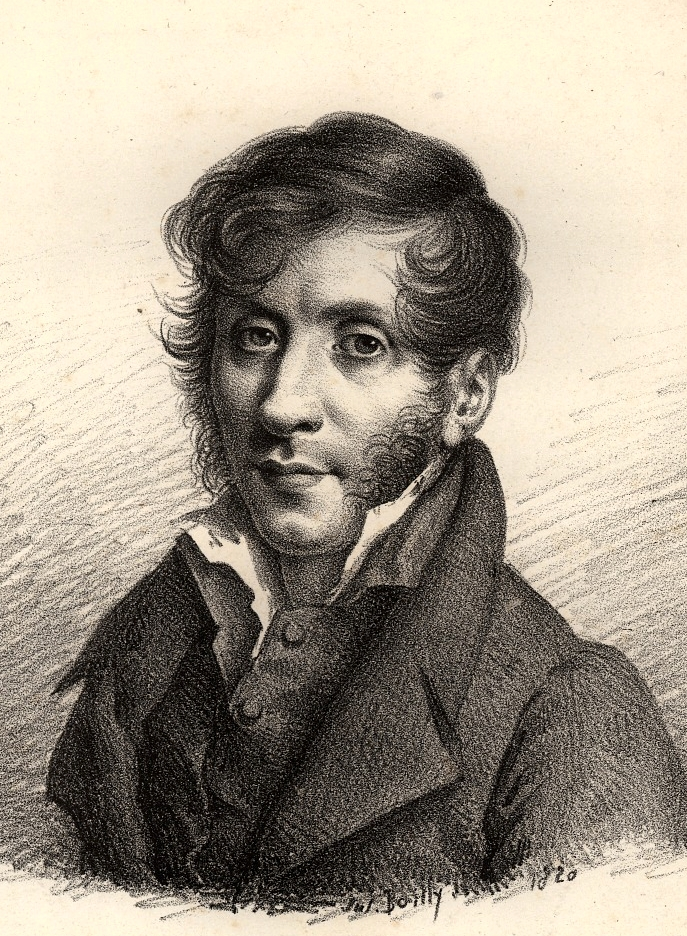
Charles Dupin.

- 6 October – Charles Dupin, mathematician (died 1873)

== Deaths ==
- 29 January – Abbé François Blanchet, intellectual (born 1707)
- 15 February – Pierre Macquer, chemist (born 1718)
- 7 March – Jean-Baptiste-Louis-Théodore de Tschudi, botanist and poet (born 1734)
- 30 March – Emmanuel de Croÿ-Solre, military officer (born 1718)
- 30 July – Denis Diderot, philosopher (born 1713)
- 1 September – Jean-François Séguier, botanist and astronomer (born 1703)
- 1 November – Jean-Jacques Lefranc, Marquis de Pompignan, man of letters and erudition (born 1709)
