= 1935 in France =

- Decades: 1910s; 1920s; 1930s; 1940s; 1950s
- See also: History of France; Timeline of French history; List of years in France

Events from the year 1935 in France.

== Incumbents ==
- President: Albert Lebrun
- President of the Council of Ministers:
  - until 1 June: Pierre-Étienne Flandin
  - 1 June-7 June: Fernand Bouisson
  - starting 7 June: Pierre Laval

== Events ==
- January – Foreign Minister Pierre Laval went to Rome to meet Italian Prime Minister Benito Mussolini.
- 7 January – Franco-Italian Agreement is signed in Rome in which each power undertakes not to oppose the other's colonial claims.
- 14 April – Stresa Front agreement is concluded between France, Britain and Italy.
- 2 May – Franco-Soviet Treaty of Mutual Assistance is concluded.
- December – Hoare–Laval Pact signed with Great Britain.

== Sport ==
- 4 July – Tour de France begins.
- 28 July – Tour de France ends, won by Romain Maes of Belgium

== Births ==
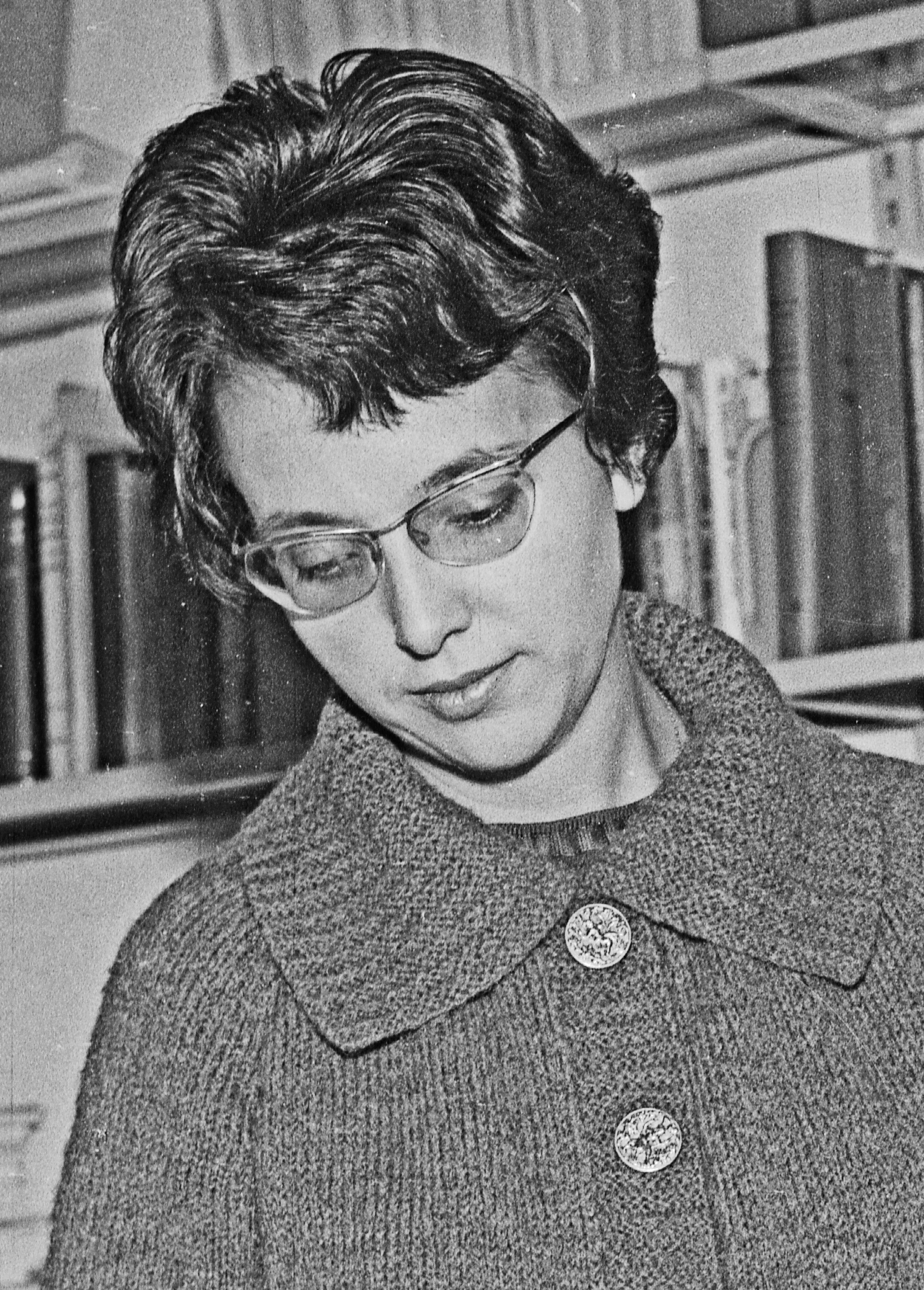
Jacqueline Naze Tjøtta in 1966

- 2 February – Jean-Louis Verdier, mathematician (died 1989)
- 12 March
  - Jacques Benveniste, immunologist (died 2004)
  - Paul John Marx, French-Papua Roman Catholic prelate (died 2018)
- 5 May – Bernard Pivot, journalist and television personality (died 2024)
- 7 May – Gérard Lefranc, fencer (died 2025)
- 1 June – Jacqueline Naze Tjøtta, mathematician (died 2017).
- 15 June – Robert Lamartine, soccer player (died 1990)
- 21 June – Françoise Sagan, playwright, novelist and screenwriter (died 2004)
- 24 August – Christian Liger, French writer (died 2002)
- 18 September – Raymond Vautherin, French-Italian linguist, poet and playwright (died 2018)
- 25 September – Adrien Douady, mathematician (died 2006)
- 8 October – Albert Roux, chef (died 2021)
- 8 November – Alain Delon, actor (died 2024)
- 9 November – Claude Kahn, pianist (died 2023)
- 18 November – Alain Barrière, singer (died 2019)

== Deaths ==
- 12 February – Auguste Escoffier, chef, restaurateur and culinary writer (born 1846)
- 17 May – Paul Dukas, composer and teacher (born 1865)
- 3 July – André Citroën, automobile pioneer (born 1878)
- 12 July – Alfred Dreyfus, military officer, victim in the Dreyfus Affair (born 1859)
- 30 August – Henri Barbusse, novelist, journalist and communist (born 1873)
- 4 October – Jean Béraud, painter and commercial artist (born 1849)
- 4 December – Charles Richet, physiologist, awarded Nobel Prize for Physiology or Medicine in 1913 (born 1850)
- 13 December – Victor Grignard, chemist, shared the Nobel Prize in Chemistry in 1912 (born 1871)

== See also ==
- List of French films of 1935
