= 1782 in France =

- Decades: 1760s; 1770s; 1780s; 1790s; 1800s
- See also: History of France; Timeline of French history; List of years in France

Events from the year 1782 in France.

== Incumbents ==
- Monarch – Louis XVI

== Events ==
Battle of Saint Kitts

- 25-26 January – Battle of Saint Kitts (American Revolutionary War): A French fleet under the Comte de Grasse clashes with the British in the West Indies
- 17 February – Battle of Sadras (Anglo-French War (1778–1783)): A French fleet under the Baillie de Suffren clashes with the British in the Bay of Bengal
- 22 February – Capture of Montserrat from the British
- 12 April – Battle of the Saintes: A French fleet under de Grasse is defeated by a British fleet under Admiral Rodney
- 19 April – Battle of the Mona Passage: Four French ships are captured by the British
- 6 July – Battle of Negapatam: A French fleet clashes with the British in the Bay of Bengal
- 14 December – The Montgolfier brothers first test fly a hot air balloon in France; it floats nearly 2 km (1.2 mi)
- Ironworks at Le Creusot established; first smelting with coke in France

== Arts and culture ==
=== Music ===
- 1 January – First performance of the opera Colinette à la cour

== Births ==
- 18 August – Marcellin Marbot, general (died 1854)
- 28 August – Antoine Maurice Apollinaire d'Argout, statesman, minister and governor (died 1858)

=== Full date unknown ===
- Charles-René Laitié, sculptor (died 1862)

== Deaths ==
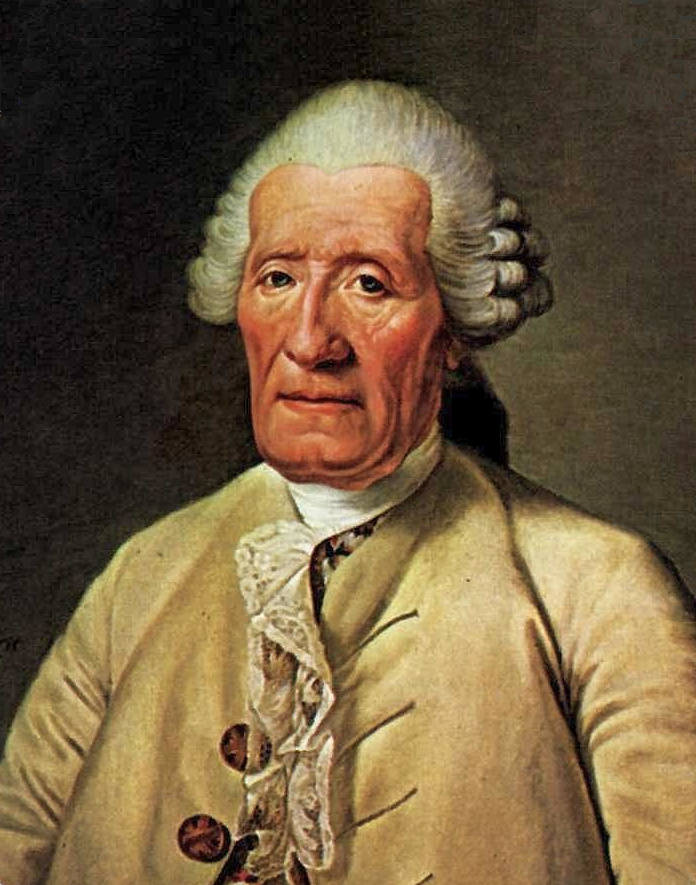
Jacques de Vaucanson

- 4 January – Ange-Jacques Gabriel, architect (born 1698)
- 2 March – Princess Sophie of France, princess (born 1734)
- 6 August – Nicolas Chédeville, composer (born 1705)
- 21 November – Jacques de Vaucanson, inventor and artist (born 1709)
