= 1942 in France =

- Decades: 1920s; 1930s; 1940s; 1950s; 1960s
- See also: History of France; Timeline of French history; List of years in France

Events from the year 1942 in France.

== Incumbents ==
- Chief of State: Philippe Pétain
- Vice-President of the Council of Ministers: François Darlan (until 18 April), Pierre Laval (starting 18 April)

== Events ==
- 19 February – Riom Trial begins, attempt by Vichy France regime to prove that the leaders of the French Third Republic had been responsible for France's defeat by Germany in 1940.
- 28 March – British Commandos raid St Nazaire on the coast of Western France.
- 5 May – Battle of Madagascar begins, Allied campaign to capture Vichy French-controlled Madagascar during World War II.
- 26 May – Battle of Bir Hakeim begins, First Free French Division defends the site against the Italian and German Afrika Korps.
- 11 June – Battle of Bir Hakeim ends, a successful delaying action.
- 14 July – Bastille Day Gaullist demonstrations in Vichy France; 2 women are shot dead by members of the fascist French Popular Party (PPF) in Marseille.
- 16 July – Vel' d'Hiv Roundup (Rafle du Vel' d'Hiv), the mass arrest of 13,152 Jews who are held at the Winter Velodrome in Paris and Drancy internment camp before deportation to Auschwitz.
- 18 September – 116 people are executed in retaliation for recent attacks on German soldiers
- 19 August – Unsuccessful Dieppe Raid is carried out by Allied forces.
- 24 September – Andrée Borrel and Lise de Baissac became the first female SOE agents to be parachuted into occupied France.
- 8 November
  - Operation Torch – United States and United Kingdom forces land in French North Africa.
  - French Resistance Coup in Algiers, by which 400 French civil resistants neutralize the Vichyist XIXth Army Corps and the Vichyist generals so allowing the immediate success of Operation Torch in Algiers.
  - Madagascar finally secured by Allied forces.
- 10 November – In violation of a 1940 armistice, Germany invades Vichy France following French Admiral François Darlan agreement to an armistice with the Allies in North Africa.
- 27 November – Scuttling of the French fleet in Toulon takes place, ordered by the Admiralty of Vichy France to avoid capture by Nazi German forces.
- 7 December – British commandos conduct Operation Frankton, a raid on shipping in Bordeaux harbour.
- 24 December – Admiral Darlan, the former Vichy leader who has switched over to the Allies following the Torch landings, assassinated in Algiers.

== Births ==
- 18 January – Johnny Servoz-Gavin, motor racing driver (died 2006)
- 21 March – Françoise Dorléac, actress (died 1967)
- 26 April – Claudine Auger, actress (died 2019)
- 12 May – Michel Fugain, singer-songwriter
- 24 June – Antoine Berman, translator and historian (died 1991)
- 12 September – François Tavenas, academic in Canada (died 2004)
- 28 September – Pierre Clémenti, actor (died 1999)
- 29 September – Jean-Luc Ponty, jazz violinist and composer
- 17 October – Jean-Pierre Dogliani, soccer player (died 2003)
- 19 October – Edmond Baraffe, soccer player and manager (died 2020)
- 30 October – Sophie Body-Gendrot, political scientist, criminologist and sociologist (died 2018)
- 8 November – Jean-Pierre Chauveau, politician
- 18 November – Janine Jambu, activist and politician (died 2012)
- 30 November – André Brahic, astrophysicist (died 2016)
- 19 December – Jean-Patrick Manchette, novelist (died 1995)

== Deaths ==
- 3 March – Yvonne Prévost, tennis player (born 1878)
- 17 April – Jean Baptiste Perrin, physicist and Nobel laureate (born 1870)
- 17 April – Jean Quarré, French printer and Communist activist (born 1918)
- 3 July – Louis Franchet d'Espérey, general during World War I (born 1856)
- 14 July – Sébastien Faure, anarchist (born 1858)
- 20 September – Jacques Émile Blanche, painter (born 1861)
- 24 December – François Darlan, Admiral (born 1881)

== See also ==
- List of French films of 1942
