= 1918 in France =

- Decades: 1890s; 1900s; 1910s; 1920s; 1930s
- See also: History of France; Timeline of French history; List of years in France

Events from the year 1918 in France.

== Incumbents ==
- President: Raymond Poincaré
- President of the Council of Ministers: Georges Clemenceau

== Events ==
- 21 March – Operation Michael begins in the vicinity of Saint-Quentin, launching Germany's Spring Offensive.
- 23 March – The giant German cannon, called the Paris Gun, begins to shell Paris from 114 km (71 mi) away.
- 27 May – The Third Battle of the Aisne begins, an attempt by the Germans to capture the Chemin des Dames Ridge before the arrival of the American Expeditionary Force to support France.
- 1 June – The Battle of Belleau Wood begins, near the Marne River.
- 6 June – Third Battle of the Aisne ends with the German advance halted after initial gains.
- 26 June – Battle of Belleau Wood ends in Allied victory.
- 15 July – The Second Battle of the Marne begins, the last major German offensive on the Western Front.
- 18 July-22 July – The Battle of Soissons is fought between the French (with American assistance) and German armies.
- 5 August – Second Battle of the Marne ends with Allied victory.
- 8 August – Battle of Amiens begins.
- 12 September – British victory in Battle of Havrincourt.
- 12 September-15 September – Battle of Saint-Mihiel, Allied victory.
- 18 September – British victory in the Battle of Épehy.
- 8 October-10 October – The Battle of Cambrai ends in a decisive Allied victory.
- 7 November – The Anglo-French Declaration is signed between France and the United Kingdom, agreeing to implement a "complete and final liberation" of countries that had been part of the Ottoman Empire.
- 11 November – Battle of Amiens ends, when the armistice is signed.

== Births ==
- 6 February – Marcel Mouly, artist (died 2008)
- 25 April – Alain Savary, politician and Minister (died 1988)
- 25 April – Gérard de Vaucouleurs, astronomer (died 1995)
- 11 May – Roger Trézel, bridge player (died 1986)
- 26 June – Roger Voisin, trumpeter (died 2008)
- 26 August – Marcel Bleibtreu, Trotskyist activist and theorist (died 2001)
- 31 August – Camille Bonnet, rugby union player (died 2020)
- 14 September – Paul Bonneau, composer (died 1995)
- 30 September – René Rémond, historian and political economist (died 2007)
- 6 October – André Pilette, motor racing driver (died 1993)
- 16 October – Louis Althusser, Marxist philosopher (died 1990)
- 22 October – René de Obaldia, playwright (died 2022)
- 7 November – Paul Aussaresses, general (died 2013)
- 8 December – Gérard Souzay, baritone (died 2004)
- 16 December – Pierre Delanoë, songwriter/lyricist (died 2006)
- 30 December – Lucien Leduc, soccer player and manager (died 2004)

=== Full date unknown ===
- Madeleine Giteau, historian (died 2005)
- Gilbert Martineau, author and curator of the French properties on St Helena (died 1995)

== Deaths ==
- 9 January – Charles-Émile Reynaud, science teacher, responsible for the first animated films (born 1844)
- 23 March — Hans Gottfried von Häbler, World War I German flying ace (born 1893)
- 25 March – Claude Debussy, composer (born 1862)
- 25 August – Henri Chantavoine, writer (born 1850)
- 5 October – Roland Garros, aviator and World War I fighter pilot (born 1888)
- 12 October – Émile Étienne Guimet, industrialist, traveller and connoisseur (born 1836)
- 13 October – Marcel Deprez, electrical engineer (born 1843)
- 9 November – Guillaume Apollinaire, poet, writer and art critic (born 1880)
- 3 December – Étienne Destot, radiologist and anatomist (born 1864)
- 22 December – Philippe Alexandre Jules Künckel d'Herculais, entomologist (born 1843)

=== Full date unknown ===
- Thérèse Humbert, fraudster (born 1856)

== See also ==
- List of French films of 1918
