= 1941 in France =

- Decades: 1920s; 1930s; 1940s; 1950s; 1960s
- See also: History of France; Timeline of French history; List of years in France

Events from the year 1941 in France.

== Incumbents ==
- Chief of State: Philippe Pétain
- Vice-President of the Council of Ministers: Pierre-Étienne Flandin (until 9 February), François Darlan (starting 9 February)

== Events ==
- 17 January – Battle of Ko Chang. Decisive victory by the French over the Thai Navy.
- 3 February – The Nazis forcibly restore Pierre Laval to office in occupied Vichy France.
- 5 May – Georges Bégué becomes (probably) the first Special Operations Executive agent to be parachuted into France.
- 9 May – French-Thai War ends.
- 8 June – Allied invasion of Vichy French-controlled Syria and Lebanon begins, the Syria–Lebanon campaign.
- 9 June – Battle of the Litani River.
- 13 June – Battle of Jezzine.
- 15 June – Battle of Kissoué begins.
- 17 June – Battle of Kissoué ends with Allied victory.
- 18 June – Battle of Damascus begins.
- 19 June – Battle of Merdjayoun starts.
- 21 June – Battle of Damascus ends, with the Allies taking Damascus.
- 24 June – Battle of Merdjayoun ends.
- 1 July – Battle of Palmyra. Vichy garrison at Palmyra surrenders.
- 3 July – Battle of Deir ez-Zor. Allied victory over Vichy French.
- 5 July – Battle of Damour begins.
- 9 July – Battle of Damour ends, with Allied victory over Vichy French.
- 14 July – Vichy France signs armistice terms ending all fighting in Syria and Lebanon.
- 21 August
  - Drancy internment camp officially opens.
  - In revenge for the execution two days earlier of French Resistance member Samuel Tyszelman, communist activist Pierre Georges (with Tyszleman's brother and two others) shoots and kills German naval cadet Alfons Moser at the Barbès – Rochechouart Paris Métro station, the first killing of a member of the German military in occupied Paris, initiating a cycle of assassinations and retribution that will claim hundreds of lives.
- 22 August - German Occupation Authority announces that anyone found either working for or aiding the Free French will be sentenced to death.
- 27 August - Pierre Laval is shot in an assassination attempt at Versailles.
- 24 November – The United States grants Lend-Lease to the Free French.
- 12 December – United States seizes French ship SS Normandie.

== Sport ==
- 25 May – Coupe de France Football Final won by Girondins ASP.

== Births ==
- 2 January – Jean-Pierre Destrumelle, soccer player and manager (died 2002)
- 29 January – Maryse Bergé-Lavigne, teacher and politician
- 13 April – Jean-Marc Reiser, comics creator (died 1983)
- 19 April – Michel Roux, chef and restaurateur (died 2020 in the United Kingdom)
- 20 May – Raymond Forni, Socialist politician (died 2008)
- 25 May – Jean-Pierre Hubert, science fiction and detective fiction author (died 2006)
- 30 June – Cyril Atanassoff, French-born Bulgarian ballet dancer
- 17 July – Gribouille, singer (died 1968)
- 1 August
  - Nathalie Delon, born Francine Canovas, film actress (died 2021)
  - Étienne Roda-Gil, songwriter and screenwriter (died 2004)
- 13 September – Daniel Bernard, diplomat (died 2004)
- 26 October – François Duprat, negationist writer (died 1978)
- 30 December – Mario Giubilei, French worker-priest (died 2016)

== Deaths ==
- 4 January – Henri Bergson, philosopher (born 1859)
- 19 February – Paul-Jacques Curie, physicist (born 1855)
- 24 February — Lothar von Arnauld de la Perière, German Imperial Naval submarine captain in World War I and Kriegsmarine Rear admiral (born 1886)
- 16 April – Émile Bernard, painter (born 1868)
- 26 July – Henri Lebesgue, mathematician (born 1875)
- 14 August – Paul Sabatier, chemist, shared Nobel Prize in Chemistry in 1912 (born 1854)
- 6 November – Maurice Leblanc, novelist and short story writer (born 1864)
- 7 December - Louise Compain, feminist author (born 1869)

== See also ==
- List of French films of 1941
