= 1786 in France =

- Decades: 1760s; 1770s; 1780s; 1790s; 1800s
- See also: History of France; Timeline of French history; List of years in France

Events from the year 1786 in France.

== Incumbents ==
- Monarch: Louis XVI

== Events ==
=== September ===
- 26 September - The Eden Agreement, a trade treaty with Great Britain, is signed.
- 5 October - Death of Jean-Baptiste Marie de Piquet, Marquess of Méjanes; his book collection is bequeathed to form the basis of the Bibliothèque Méjanes at Aix-en-Provence.

== Births ==
- 11 January - Louis Tromelin
- 13 January - Pierre-Dominique Bazaine
- 23 January - Auguste de Montferrand
- 2 February - Jacques Philippe Marie Binet
- 4 March - Amédée Despans-Cubières
- 31 March - Louis Vicat
- 20 April - Marc Seguin
- 9 July - Princess Sophie Hélène Béatrice of France
- 10 July - John Baptiste Henri Joseph Desmazières
- 31 August - Michel Eugène Chevreul
- 29 September - Auguste-François Michaut
- 10 October - François-Édouard Picot
- 21 October
  - Henry Lemoine
  - Louis Isidore Duperrey
- 30 December - André Étienne d'Audebert de Férussac

== Deaths ==
- 7 January - Jean-Étienne Guettard
- 14 January - Catherine-Nicole Lemaure
- 6 March - Charles Germain de Saint Aubin
- 22 June - Claude Arnulphy
- 2 August - François-Louis Gand Le Bland Du Roullet
- 20 December - Nicolas Thyrel de Boismont
