= 1777 in France =

- Decades: 1750s; 1760s; 1770s; 1780s; 1790s
- See also: History of France; Timeline of French history; List of years in France

Events from the year 1777 in France.

== Incumbents ==
- Monarch – Louis XVI

== Events ==
- 3 June – Treaty of Aranjuez

== Births ==
- 31 January – Jean-Pierre Vibert, rosarian (died 1866)
- 12 February
  - Bernard Courtois, chemist (died 1838)
  - Friedrich de la Motte Fouqué, poet (died 1843)
- 3 March – Adolphe Dureau de la Malle, geographer, naturalist, historian and artist (died 1857)
- 3 December – Juliette Récamier, saloniste (died 1849)
- Auguste, comte de La Ferronays, politician (died 1842)

== Deaths ==
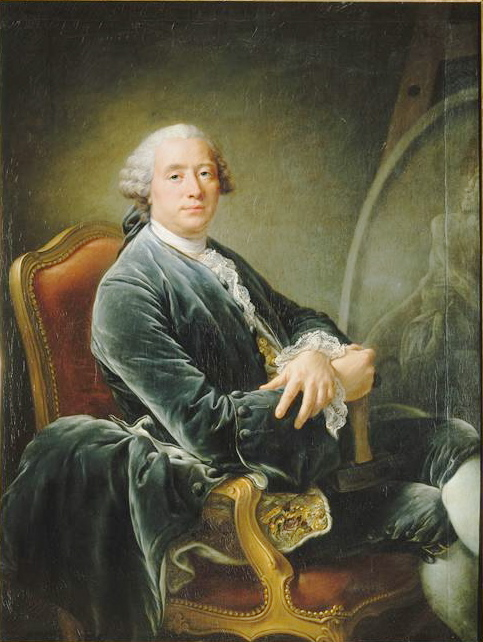
Guillaume Coustou the Younger painted by François-Hubert Drouais

- 27 January – Hubert de Brienne, naval commander (born 1690)
- 20 March – Jean-François-Joseph de Rochechouart, cardinal (born 1708)
- 7 May
  - Charles de Brosses, writer (born 1709)
  - Jean-Baptiste Nicolas Roch de Ramezay, officer of the marines and colonial administrator for New France (born 1708)
- 23 August – Charles-Joseph Natoire, painter (born 1700)
- 16 June - Jean-Baptiste-Louis Gresset, a French poet and dramatist (born 1709)
- 13 July – Guillaume Coustou the Younger, sculptor (born 1715)
- 6 October – Marie Thérèse Rodet Geoffrin, saloniste (born 1699)
