= 1789 in France =

- Decades: 1760s; 1770s; 1780s; 1790s; 1800s
- See also: History of France; Timeline of French history; List of years in France

Events from the year 1789 in France

== Incumbents ==
- Monarch – Louis XVI

== Events ==
Date	Events	Photos	Refs
Sunday, 26 April	Riot in the Faubourg Saint-Antoine suburb of Paris against the manufacturer of Réveillon wallpapers.		
Tuesday, 5 May	Convention of the Estates-General of 1789, the first meeting since 1614 of the Estates-General		
Saturday, 20 June	The Tennis Court Oath is made in Versailles.		
Thursday, 9 July	Forming of the National Constituent Assembly		
Saturday, 11 July	Louis XVI dismisses popular Chief Minister Jacques Necker.		
Sunday, 12 July	An angry Parisian crowd, inflamed by a speech from journalist Camille Desmoulins, demonstrates against the King's decision to dismiss Necker.; Paris is in a state of generalized riot. There are clashes between the protesters and the riders of the Royal-Allemand cavalry.		
Monday, 13 July	The convent of Saint-Lazare is totally looted and ransacked following a rumor that grains and weapons would be stored there.; The people begin to seize arms for the defense of Paris.		
Tuesday, 14 July	Citizens of Paris storm the fortress of the Bastille, and free the only seven prisoners held. In rural areas, peasants attack manors of the nobility.; The governor of the Bastille, Launay, three officers and three disabled are arrested and escorted to the city hall and massacred by the crowd.; Jacques de Flesselles, provost of the merchants of Paris, is accused of treason and killed with a pistol shot.		
Wednesday, 15 July	In the morning, the king announces before the assembly that he has given the order to withdraw the troops from Paris.; The crowd seizes the arsenal at Rennes; the soldiers refuse to fire on the people.; Cannons of Paris are brought to Montmartre.		
Sunday, 19 July	Storming of the city hall of Strasbourg.		
Wednesday, 22 July	The Controller-General of Finances, Foullon and the Intendant of Paris, Bertier de Savigny, are massacred during a riot.; The Grande Peur, a period of rural unrest, begins in the Franche-Comté.		
Tuesday, 4 August	Members of the National Constituent Assembly take an oath to end feudalism and abandon their privileges.		
Thursday, 1 October	Banquet of the Gardes du Corps at Versailles.		
Monday, 5 October	Women's March on Versailles		

== Births ==
- 4 January – Alphonse Henri d'Hautpoul, military officer and politician (died 1865)
- 21 August – Augustin-Louis Cauchy, mathematician (died 1857)
- 28 August – Stéphanie de Beauharnais, nobility (died 1860)
- 31 December – Claudius Crozet, educator and engineer (died 1864)

== Deaths ==
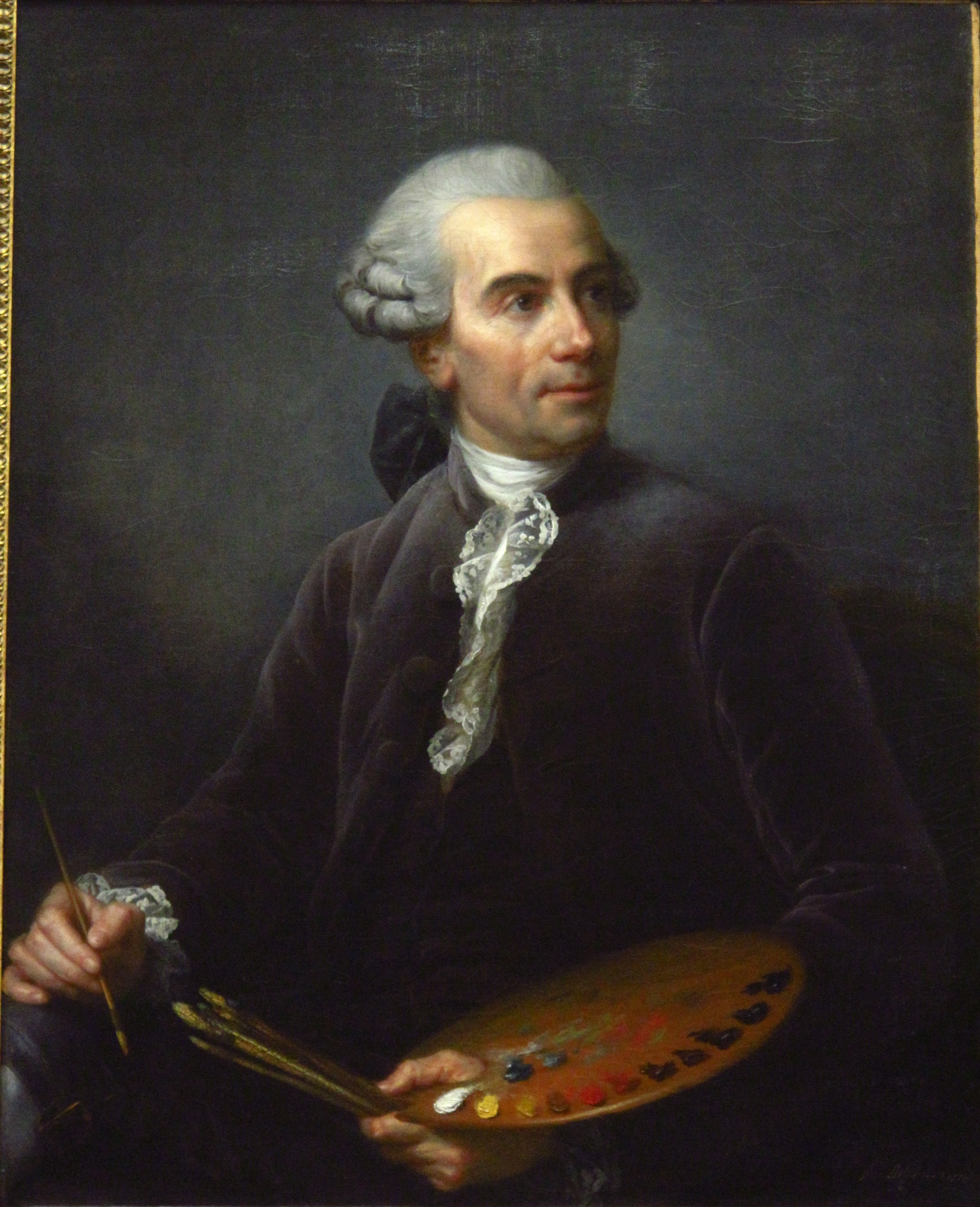
Claude Joseph Vernet.

- 2 February – Armand-Louis Couperin, composer and keyboard player (born 1727)
- 9 May – Jean-Baptiste Vaquette de Gribeauval, artillery officer (born 1715)
- 15 May – Jean-Baptiste Marie Pierre, painter (born 1714)
- 15 July – Jacques Duphly, composer and harpsichordist (born 1715)
- 3 December – Claude Joseph Vernet, painter (born 1714).
- 23 December – Charles-Michel de l'Épée, philanthropist, developer of signed French (born 1712)
