= Interwar France =

1918 to 1939 in France

- 1918–1939
| World War I, Belle Époque | World War II |
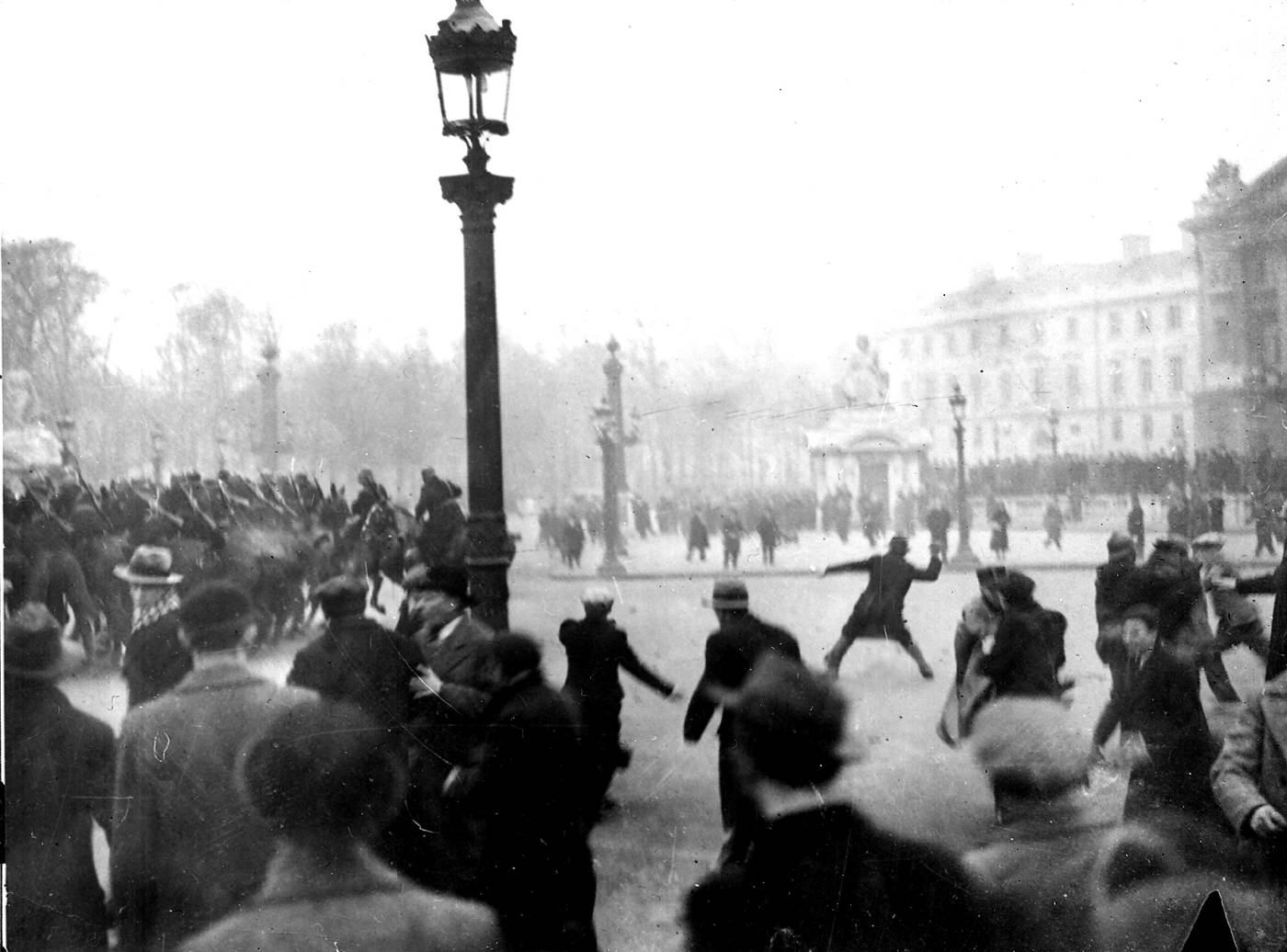
- 6 February 1934 crisis, also known as the Veterans' Riot
- Location: France
- Including: Années folles Great Depression
- President(s): Raymond Poincaré; Paul Deschanel; Alexandre Millerand; Gaston Doumergue; Paul Doumer; Albert Lebrun
- Prime Minister(s): Georges Clemenceau; Alexandre Millerand; Georges Leygues; Aristide Briand; Raymond Poincaré; Frédéric François-Marsal; Édouard Herriot; Paul Painlevé; André Tardieu; Camille Chautemps; Théodore Steeg; Pierre Laval; Joseph Paul-Boncour; Édouard Daladier; Albert Sarraut; Pierre-Étienne Flandin; Fernand Bouisson; Léon Blum

Interwar France covers the political, economic, diplomatic, cultural and social history of France from 1918 to 1939. France suffered heavily during World War I in terms of lives lost, disabled veterans and ruined agricultural and industrial areas occupied by Germany as well as heavy borrowing from the United States, Britain, and the French people. However, postwar reconstruction was rapid, and the long history of political warfare along religious lines of the time was ended.

Parisian culture was world-famous in the 1920s, with expatriate artists, musicians and writers from across the globe contributing their cosmopolitanism, such as jazz music, and the French colonial empire was in flourishing condition, especially in North Africa, and in sub-Saharan Africa. Although the official goal was complete assimilation, few colonial subjects were actually assimilated.

Major concerns were forcing Germany to pay for the war damage by reparations payments and guaranteeing that Germany, with its much larger population, would never be a military threat in the future. Efforts to set up military alliances worked poorly. Relations remained very tense with Germany until 1924, when they stabilized thanks to large American bank loans. However, after 1929 the German economy was very badly hit by the Great Depression, and its political scene descended into chaos and violence. The Nazis under Hitler took control in early 1933 and aggressively rearmed. Paris was bitterly divided between pacifism and rearmament, so it supported London's efforts to appease Hitler.

French domestic politics became increasingly chaotic and grim after 1932, moving back and forth between right and left, without clear goals in mind. The economy finally succumbed to the Great Depression by 1932 and did not recover. The popular mood turned very sour and focused its wrath on the corruption and scandals in high government places. There was a growing threat of politicized right-wing violence in the streets of Paris, but the numerous right-wing groupings were unable to forge a political coalition.

On the left, the Popular Front pulled together Radicals (a centrist party), socialists and communists. The coalition stayed in power for 13 months from 1936 to 1937. After massive labor union strikes, it passed a series of reforms designed to help the working classes. The reforms were mostly failures, and the disheartened Popular Front collapsed on foreign policy issues.

War came when Hitler's Germany stunningly reached a détente with Stalin's Soviet Union in August 1939, and both countries invaded Poland in September 1939. France and Britain had pledged to defend Poland and so declared war on Germany.

== Wartime losses ==
France suffered severe human and economic damage during the war. The human losses included 1.3 million men killed, or 10.5 percent of the available Frenchmen, compared to 9.8 percent for Germany and 5.1 percent for Great Britain. In addition, 1.1 million veteran men were severely wounded and often incapacitated. Many hundreds of thousands of civilians had died in the Spanish flu, which struck as the war was ending. The population was further weakened by missing births, amounting to about 1.4 million while the menfolk were at war.

In monetary terms, economist Alfred Sauvy estimated a loss of 55 billion francs (in 1913 value), or 15 months' worth of national income that could never be restored. The harsh German occupation had wreaked special havoc on 13,000 square miles in northeastern France. In addition to the smashed up battlefields, the region's railways, bridges, mines, factories, commercial offices and private housing were all massively affected. Germans pillaged the factories and farms, removing machines and tools as well as 840,000 head of cattle, 400,000 horses 900,000 sheep and 330,000 hogs.

The government promised to make it good again, committing 20 billion francs. The plan was to have Germany repay everything by reparations. Repairs and rebuilding were quick and highly successful.

== Economic and social growth ==
The interwar total population grew very slowly, from 38.8 million in 1921 to 41.2 million in 1936. Educationally, there was steady improvement, and secondary enrollment grew from 158,000 in 1921 to 248,000 in 1936. University enrollment grew from 51,000 to 72,000. In a typical year, there were from 300 to 1200 strikes taking place, jumping to 17,000 in 1936, with the number of strikers soaring from 240,000 in 1929 to 2.4 million in 1936. As in other industrial countries, exports grew rapidly in the 1920s and plunged greatly in the 1930s.

Industrial production recovered to prewar levels by 1924 and declined only by 10 percent during the depression. Throughout the interwar period, steel and coal were strong, and motor vehicles became the major new industrial sector of increased importance during the 1920s.

=== Labour movement ===
Labour unions had supported the war effort and grew rapidly until 1919. The general strike and railway strikes of 1920 were a total failure; 25,000 railwaymen active in the unions were later fired, the companies blacklisted union leaders and trade union membership plunged. In 1921, the General Confederation of Labour (CGT) split permanently, with more extreme elements forming the Confédération générale du travail unitaire (CGTU). It enlisted the syndicalists who wanted direct union ownership and control of the factories by and for the benefit of the workers. It soon lost the spirit of revolutionary syndicalism and came under the close control of the French Communist Party, which in turn was controlled by the Profintern, the Red Trade Union International, based in the Kremlin.

In the 1920s and the 1930s, the Paris Metal Union became the test bed for communist unionism at the plant level. The model spread to all communist unions as the party shifted from winning votes at general elections to control of factory cells. A small number of disciplined party members controlled the cells, which then controlled the entire union at the factory. The strategy was a success and was essential to very rapid growth in the 1930s.

Union membership doubled during the war and peaked at 2,000,000 for 1919 out of some 8,000,000 industrial workers, or about 25 per cent. After the plunge in 1921, membership slowly grew to 1,500,000 in 1930, or 19% of the 8 million employed that year. The heaviest losses came in metal factories, textile mills, and construction. The greatest density was in printing, where 40% were members. Blue-collar government workers were increasingly unionized by 1930, especially the railways and trams.

=== Great Depression ===
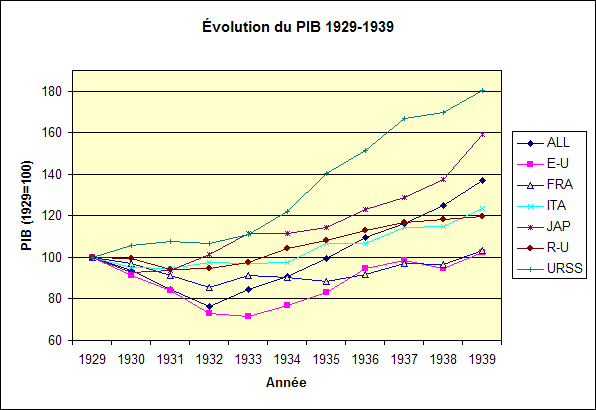
Evolution of gross domestic product in several countries between 1929 and 1939

The Great Depression affected France from 1931 to 1939 but was milder than in other industrial countries. While the 1920s economy grew very fast at 4.4% per year, the increase in the 1930s was only 0.6%. The depression was relatively mild at first since unemployment peaked under 5%, the fall in production was at most 20% below the 1929 output and there was no banking crisis. The depression had some effects on the local economy, which can partly explain the 6 February 1934 crisis and especially the formation of the Popular Front, led by the leader of the socialist SFIO, Léon Blum, who won the 1936 elections.

The sour economic mood after 1932 heightened French exclusionism and xenophobia, which caused protectionism against importing foreign goods and allowing in foreign workers. Asylum-seekers were not welcome, including thousands of Jews trying to flee Nazi Germany after 1933. Hostility to foreign workers was connected to the lack of a legal framework for the effective treatment of refugees. The middle classes resented Jews in France and showed anger at competition for jobs or business. That fed anti-Semitism, which was more than a symbolic protest against the republic or communism. By the end of 1933, France began to expel refugee Jews, and right-wing movements escalated their rhetorical anti-Semitism.

== Social and cultural trends ==
=== Religion ===
Almost all of the population used church services primarily to mark important life events, such as baptism, marriage and funerals. Otherwise, religiosity was steadily declining and already varied enormously across France. The largest groupings were the devout Catholics, the passive Catholics, the anticlerical secularists, and small minorities of Protestants and Jews.

Pope Benedict XV (1914–1922) ended Pope Pius X's harsh anti-modernist crusade and returned to the tolerant policies of Pope Leo XIII. That enabled the French modernizers, such as Christian democrat Marc Sangnier, who had led the liberal-leftist Le Sillon until the Church pressured him into shutting it down, to be restored to the Church's good graces. The new spirit from Rome enabled a permanent end to the rancorous prewar battles between secularism on one hand and Church on the other. It had climaxed in a major victory for the anticlerical Republicans in the 1905 French law on the Separation of the Churches and the State, which disestablished the Catholic Church and took legal control of all its buildings and lands.

Reconciliation was enabled by the wartime dedication of so many Catholics fighting and dying for the nation and so most allegations of disloyalty disappeared. More immediately, the conservatives secured a large majority in the Chamber of Deputies in the 1919 elections, and Aristide Briand took the opportunity for reconciliation. In 1920, 80 members of Parliament joined the delegation to Rome for the canonization of Joan of Arc. Formal diplomatic relations were reestablished in January 1921. In December 1923 the government set up diocesan associations under control of bishops for the administration of church property that had been seized two decades earlier.

In January 1924, the Briand-Ceretti Agreement was approved by Pope Pius XI and the Holy See recognised the Catholic Associations Culturelles established after the 1905 laws. The Catholics set up numerous local organizations, especially youth groups, to try to combat falling activism among the remaining church members. In 1919, the Church established a union, French Confederation of Christian Workers (CFTC), to bargain with employers and act as a political force. It was in competition with socialist and communist labor unions. However, only a few industrial workers were unionized until the 1930s.

In 1929, Pope Pius XI condemned the royalist movement Action Française, which until then was supported by a large number of Catholics, clergy and laity alike. Several of the works of the movement's founder Charles Maurras were placed into the Index Librorum Prohibitorum, alongside the movement's official newspaper. This was a devastating blow to the movement. On 8 March 1927, AF members were prohibited from receiving the sacraments. Many of its members left (two Catholics who were forced to look for a different path in politics and life were writers François Mauriac and Georges Bernanos); and it entered a period of decline. Condemnation was repealed by Pope Pius XII in 1939.

=== Expatriate culture ===
Expatriate writers, artists, composers and would-be intellectuals from around the world flocked to Paris for study, entertainment, connections and production of artistry in a highly-supportive environment. Many Americans came to escape the commercialism back home. Led by Gertrude Stein, F. Scott Fitzgerald, Ernest Hemingway, E. E. Cummings, William Faulkner and Katherine Anne Porter, they formed a lively colony that sought out new experiences and soon had a large impact on culture back home. A new factor was the arrival of hundreds of university students stretching their experiences through one of several junior year abroad programs that began about 1923. They lived with French families and took classes at French universities under the close supervision of their American professor for which they earned a full year's academic credit. Many musicians came to study with Nadia Boulanger.

==== Black Paris ====
Aimé Césaire, a poet from Martinique, was a representative leader of the emerging black community of Paris in the 1920s and 1930s. He was a founder of the négritude movement, a racial identity movement for a community that included blacks from the French West Indies, the US and French Africa. Other prominent leaders included Léopold Sédar Senghor (elected in 1960 as the first president of independent Senegal) and Léon Damas of French Guiana. The intellectuals disavowed colonialism and argued for the importance of a Pan-African racial identity worldwide. Writers generally used a realist literary style and often used Marxist rhetoric reshaped to the black radical tradition.

Blacks from the US made a dramatic impact by introducing New Orleans-style jazz. American music had a major impact since the avant-garde welcomed what they called "wild sound" of rhythmic explosions that unleashed gyrations upon the dance floor. However, white French musicians based in dance halls softened the harsh and shocking US style and made it very popular.

==== Chinese Work-Study Program ====
Between 1908 and 1927, poor Chinese citizens could "pay" for studies in France by supplying manual labor in factories. Several prominent Chinese figures would acquire French language ability and familiarity with French culture through this program, notably future Premier Zhou Enlai and Paramount Leader Deng Xiaoping.

== Foreign policy ==
French foreign and security policy after 1919 used traditional alliance strategies to weaken the German potential to threaten France and to force the Germans to adhere to terms devised by France in the strict Treaty of Versailles. The main diplomatic strategy came after the French Army demanded the formations of alliances against Germany. After resistance, Germany finally complied, aided by American money, and France took a more conciliatory policy by 1924 in response to pressure from Britain and the United States and the French realization that its potential allies in Eastern Europe were weak and unwilling to co-ordinate.

Establishing military alliances with the United States or Britain proved to be impossible and one with the Soviets in 1935 was politically suspect and was not implemented. The alliances with Poland and Czechoslovakia proved to be weak ties and collapsed in the face of German threats in 1938 in 1939.

=== 1920s ===
France was part of the Allied force that occupied the Rhineland following the armistice. Foch supported Poland in the Greater Poland Uprising and in the Polish–Soviet War and France also joined Spain during the Rif War. From 1925 until his death in 1932, Aristide Briand, as prime minister during five short intervals, directed French foreign policy by using his diplomatic skills and sense of timing to forge friendly relations with Weimar Germany as the basis of a genuine peace within the framework of the League of Nations. He realised France could not contain the much larger Germany by itself or secure effective support from Britain or the League.

In January 1923, in response to Germany's failure to ship enough coal as part of its reparations, France and Belgium occupied the industrial region of the Ruhr. Germany responded with passive resistance and supported the idled workers by printing additional money, spurring the onset of hyperinflation. It heavily damaged the German middle class, whose savings became worthless, and also damaged the French franc. The intervention was a failure, and in the summer of 1924, France accepted an international solution to the reparations issues, as expressed in the Dawes Plan. It set up a staggered schedule for Germany's payment of war reparations, provided for a large loan to stabilize the German currency and ended the occupation of the Ruhr. With the help of loans from foreign banks, most of them American, Germany was then able to meet its reparations payments under the new schedule.

The United States demanded repayment of the war loans although the terms were slightly softened in 1926. All loans, payments and reparations were suspended in 1931, and everything was finally resolved in 1951.

In the 1930s, France built the Maginot Line, an elaborate system of static border defences that was designed to stop any German invasion. However, it did not extend into Belgium, and Germany attacked there in 1940 and went around the French defenses. Military alliances were signed with weak powers in 1920–21, called the "Little Entente".

== Politics ==
=== Parties ===
The Republican-Radical and Radical-Socialist Party, usually called the Radical Party, (1901–1940), was the 20th-century version of the radical political movement founded by Leon Gambetta in the 1870s. It attracted 20–25% of deputies elected in the interwar years and had a middle-class base. The "radicalism" meant opposition to royalism and support for anticlerical measures to weaken the role of Catholic Church in education and supported its disestablishment. Its program was otherwise vaguely in favor of liberty, social progress, and peace, and its structure was always much thinner than rival parties on the right (such as the Democratic Republican Alliance) and the left (socialists and communists). Party organizations at the departmental level were largely independent of Paris. National conventions were attended by only a third of the delegates, and there was no official party newspaper.

It split into moderate and leftist wings, represented respectively by Édouard Herriot (1872–1957) and Édouard Daladier (1884–1970). "Socialist" in its title was misleading, and the party had little support among workers or labor unions. Its middle position made it a frequent partner in coalition governments, and its leaders increasingly focused on holding office and providing patronage to their followers. Other major leaders included Georges Clemenceau (1841–1929), Joseph Caillaux (1863–1944), and Aristide Briand (1862–1932).

=== 1920s ===
Domestic politics in the 1920s were a product of unresolved problems left by the war and peace, especially the economics of reconstruction and how to make Germany pay for it all. The great planners were Raymond Poincaré, Alexandre Millerand and Aristide Briand. France had paid for the war with very heavy borrowing at home and from Britain and the United States. Heavy inflation resulted, and in 1922, Poincaré became prime minister. He justified his strong anti-German policies:

Germany's population was increasing, her industries were intact, she had no factories to reconstruct, she had no flooded mines. Her resources were intact, above and below ground.... in fifteen or twenty years Germany would be mistress of Europe. In front of her would be France with a population scarcely increased.

Poincaré used German reparations to maintain the franc at a tenth of its prewar value and to pay for the reconstruction of the devastated areas. Since Germany refused to pay nearly as much as Paris demanded, Poincaré reluctantly sent the French army to occupy the Ruhr industrial area (1923) to force a showdown. The British strongly objected, arguing that it "would only impair German recovery, topple the German government, [and] lead to internal anarchy and Bolshevism, without achieving the financial goals of the French."

The Germans engaged in passive resistance, and the government paid idled workers mostly through printing paper money, which damaged both the German and French economies. The standoff was solved by American dollars in the Dawes Plan. New York banks lent money to Germany for reparations to France, which then used the same dollars to repay the Americans. Throughout the early postwar period, Poincaré's political base was the conservative nationalist parliament elected in 1920. However, at the next election (1924), a coalition of Radical Socialists and Socialists called the "Cartel des gauches" ("Cartel of the Lefts") won a majority, and Herriot of the Radical Socialist Party became prime minister. He was disillusioned by the imperialist thrust of the Versailles Treaty, and sought a stable international peace in rapprochement with the Soviet Union to block the rising German revanchist movement, especially after Hitler's rise in January 1933.

=== 1930s ===
==== Conservatism and fascism ====
The two major far-right parties were the French Social Party (Parti social français, PSF), originally the Fiery Cross (Croix de feu) and the French Popular Party (Parti populaire français, PPF). The PSF was much larger, reaching as many as a million members, and grew increasingly conservative. The PPF was much smaller, with perhaps 50,000 members, and became more fascist. The chief impact for both movements was to bring together their enemies on the left and center into the Popular Front.

The Croix de Feu was originally an elite veterans' organization that François de La Rocque took over in 1929 and made a political movement. The Croix-de-Feu was dissolved in June 1936 by the Popular Front government, and de La Rocque quickly formed the new Parti social français. Both organizations were authoritarian and conservative, hostile to democracy and devoted to the defence of property, the family, and the nation against the threat of decay or leftist revolution. The motto of PSF was "travail, famille, patrie" ("work, family, fatherland"). Its base was in urban areas, especially Paris, the industrial North, and Algeria. Most members were young (born after 1890) and middle-class, and it had few blue collar or farm workers. The PSF grew rapidly in the late 1930s, with more members than the communists and socialists combined. It reached out to include more workers and rural elements. De La Rocque was a charismatic leader but a poor politician with vague ideas. His movement opposed the far-right Vichy regime and its leaders were arrested and the PSF vanished.

It was never invited to join a governing coalition. Whether or not it was "fascist" is debated by scholars. Many resemblances existed but not the key fascist promise of the creation of a revolutionary "new fascist man". Instead, its goal was to return to the past and to rely upon the old traditional values of Church and Army.

==== Non-conformists of the 1930s ====
The non-conformists of the 1930s were intellectuals seeking new solutions to face the political, economic and social crisis. The movement revolved around Emmanuel Mounier's personalism. They attempted to find a "third (communitarian) alternative" between socialism and capitalism and opposed both liberalism and fascism.

Three main currents were active:

- The review Esprit, founded in 1931 by Mounier and was the main mouthpiece of personalism.
- The Ordre nouveau (New Order) group, created by Alexandre Marc and influenced by Robert Aron and Arnaud Dandieu's works. Jean Coutrot became during the Popular Front vice-president of the Committee of Scientific Organisation of Labour of the Minister Charles Spinasse and participated in the technical reunions of Ordre nouveau.
- The Jeune Droite ("Young Right") gathered young intellectuals who had broken with the far-right Action Française, including Jean de Fabrègues, Jean-Pierre Maxence, Thierry Maulnier, and Maurice Blanchot.

The young intellectuals (most were about 25 years old) all considered that France was confronted by a "civilisation crisis" and, despite their differences, opposed what Mounier called the "established disorder" (le désordre établi); he meant capitalism, individualism, economic liberalism and materialism. They aimed at creating the conditions of a "spiritual revolution" that would simultaneously transform Man and things. They called for a "New Order", which would be beyond individualism and collectivism and oriented towards a "federalist", "communautary and personalist" organisation of social relations.

The non-conformists were influenced both by socialism, in particular by Proudhonism and by Social Catholicism, which permeated Esprit and the Jeune Droite. They inherited from both currents a form of scepticism towards politics, which explains some stances towards anti-statism and renewed interest in social and economical transformations. The movement paid attention to civil society and distrusted the state. It favored "intermediate bodies", especially the family and the village.

After the February 6, 1934 riots, the non-conformists split several ways. Bertrand de Jouvenel made the link between the non-conformists and the supporters of planisme, a new economical theory invented by the Belgian Henri de Man as well as with the technocratic Groupe X-Crise. They influenced both Vichy's Révolution nationale and the Resistance (Combat, Défense de la France, Organisation civile et militaire etc.)

==== Popular Front: 1936–1937 ====
As the Great Depression finally hit France hard in 1932, the popular mood became hostile. A series of cabinets were wholly ineffective, and anger at the mounting unemployment caused xenophobia, borders being closed and a startling growth in anti-Semitism. Distrust of the entire political system grew rapidly, especially during the dramatic Stavisky Affair, a massive financial fraud that involving many deputies and top government officials. The promise of democracy seemed a failure in France and many other countries as they turned toward authoritarian rule, a trend that began by Lenin in Russia in 1918 and Mussolini in Italy in 1922 and continued in Spain, Portugal, Poland, the Baltic countries, the Balkans, Japan, Latin America and, most horrifying of all, by Hitler in Nazi Germany in January 1933. It now threatened France after the scandal's exposure brought huge mobs into the streets of Paris.

All night on February 6 and 7, 1934, attacks took place against the police defending Parliament from physical assault, mostly by right-wing attackers. The police killed 15 demonstrators and halted their advance. Journalist Alexander Werth argues:

At that time the Croix de Feu, the Royalists, the Solidarité and the Jeunesses Patriotes had no more than a few thousand active members between them, and that they would have been incapable of a real armed uprising. What they reckoned on was the support of the Paris public as a whole; and the most that they could reasonably have aimed at was the resignation of the Daladier Government. When this happened, on February 7, Colonel de la Rocque announced that 'the first objective had been attained.'

PCF = Communists; SFIO = Socialists

The 6 February outrage shocked centrists and leftists, which had been feuding ceaselessly for decades. On February 12, a huge leftist counter-demonstration had communist workers spontaneously joined with the Radical Socialists and Socialists against what seemed to them to be a serious fascist threat. Centrists and leftists slowly began to assemble an unprecedented three-way coalition, with socialists being the largest party, followed by the Radicals and then the French Communist Party. Stalin had recently ordered that all Communist Parties should stop fighting the socialists and combine to form an antifascist popular front, which was carried out in France. The communists supported the government but refused to take any cabinet seats.

The 3 May 1936 French legislative election confirmed the political upheaval. Conservative forces were decimated, and the socialist Léon Blum, who led the largest coalition party, SFIO, became the prime minister. A massive wave of strikes occurred in which 2 million workers shut down French industry and paralyzed the forces of business and conservatism. That inspired the coalition government to pass hurriedly multiple packages of new programs designed for the benefit of the working class.

The key provisions included immediate wage increases of 12 percent, general collective bargaining with unions, a 40-hour week, paid vacations, compulsory arbitration of labor disputes and the nationalisation of the Bank of France and some key munitions plants. The conservative opposition was dissolved, most notably the Croix de Feu, but it reorganised quickly as a political party.

The left had assumed such reforms would liberate the workers and also the entire economy, but the economy did not respond well. Prices rose, and inflation negated the wage increases and hurt the middle class by sharply cutting into their savings accounts. Industrial production did not increase, and militant workers made sure that even if demand was very strong, factories would shut down after 40 hours. Unemployment remained high, the government deficit soared and the government was forced to devalue the franc.

Blum had never been accustomed to working with coalition partners, and his coalition started coming apart until it completely collapsed in June 1937, after only 380 days in office. Despite strong working class support for the Popular Front, there was strong middle class opposition.

== Appeasement and war: 1938–1939 ==
Appeasement was increasingly adopted as Germany grew stronger after 1933 since France suffered a stagnant economy, unrest in its colonies and bitter internal political fighting. Martin Thomas believed that appeasement was neither a coherent diplomatic strategy nor a copy of British policy. France appeased Italy over Ethiopia for fear of an alliance between Italy and Germany.

When Hitler sent troops into the Rhineland, a demilitarised area of Germany in which no German troops were permitted, neither Paris nor London risked war and so nothing was done.

The Blum government joined Britain in establishing an arms embargo during the Spanish Civil War (1936–39). Blum rejected support for the Spanish Republicans because his opponents threatened to spread the civil war to the deeply-divided France. As the Republicans faltered in Spain, Blum secretly supplied the cause with arms, funds and sanctuaries. Financial support and military co-operation with Poland also occurred. The government nationalized arms suppliers and dramatically increased its program of rearming the French military in a last-minute catch up with the Germans.

France sought peace, even in the face of Hitler's escalating demands, by appeasing Germany, in co-operation with Britain. Édouard Daladier refused to go to war against Germany and Italy without British support when Neville Chamberlain tried to save peace through the Munich Agreement in 1938. France's military alliance with Czechoslovakia was sacrificed at Hitler's demand when France and Britain agreed to his terms at Munich.

== Overseas empire ==
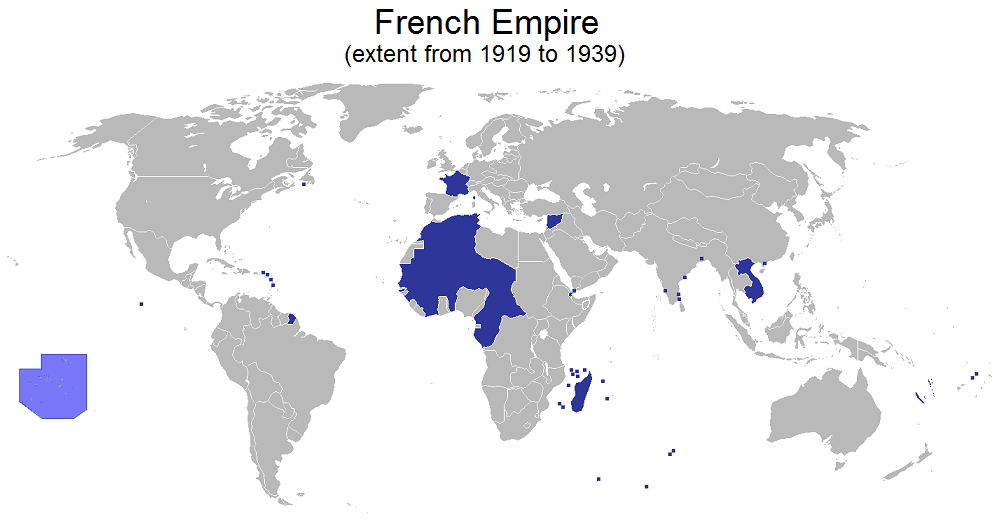
The interwar French empire

French census statistics from 1931 show an imperial population, outside of France itself, of 64.3 million people living on 11.9 million square kilometres. Of the total population, 39.1 million lived in Africa, 24.5 million lived in Asia and 700,000 lived in the Caribbeans or islands in the South Pacific. The largest colonies were Indochina with 21.5 million (in five separate colonies), Algeria with 6.6 million, Morocco with 5.4 million and West Africa with 14.6 million in nine colonies. The total included 1.9 million Europeans and 350,000 "assimilated" natives.

A hallmark of the French colonial project from the late 19th century until the Second World war was the civilising mission (mission civilisatrice). Its principle was that it was France's duty to bring civilisation to benighted peoples. As such, colonial officials undertook a policy of Franco-Europeanisation in French colonies, most notably French West Africa and Madagascar.

Catholicism was a major factor in the civilising mission, and many missionaries were sent and often operated schools and hospitals. During the 19th century, French citizenship, along with the right to elect a deputy to the French Chamber of Deputies, was granted to the four old colonies of Guadeloupe, Martinique, Guyanne, and Réunion as well as to the residents of the "Four Communes" in Senegal. Typically, the elected deputies were white Frenchmen, but there were some blacks, such as the Senegalese Blaise Diagne, who was elected in 1914. Elsewhere, in the largest and most populous colonies, a strict separation between "sujets français" (natives) and "citoyens français" (males of European extraction), with different rights and duties, was maintained until 1946.

French colonial law held that the granting of French citizenship to natives was a privilege, not a right. Two 1912 decrees dealing with French West Africa and French Equatorial Africa enumerated the conditions that a native had to meet to be granted French citizenship (they included speaking and writing French, earning a decent living and displaying good moral standards). For the 116 years from 1830 to 1946, only between 3000 and 6000 native Algerians were granted French citizenship. Well under 10 percent of the Algerian population was of European descent, and there were more Spanish and Italians than those who migrated from Metropolitan France. The Europeans controlled virtually the entire Algerian economy and political system, and few Muslims progressed out of poverty. In French West Africa, outside of the Four Communes, there were 2,500 "citoyens indigènes" out of a total population of 15 million.

French conservatives had been denouncing the assimilationist policies as products of a dangerous liberal fantasy. In the Protectorate of Morocco, the French administration attempted to use urban planning and colonial education to prevent cultural mixing and to uphold the traditional society upon which the French depended for collaboration but with only mixed results. After the Second World War, the segregationist approach modeled in Morocco had been discredited by its connections to Vichyism, and assimilationism enjoyed a brief renaissance.

Critics of French colonialism gained an international audience in the 1920s and often used documentary reportage and access to agencies such as the League of Nations and the International Labour Organization to make their protests heard. The main criticism was the high level of violence and suffering among the natives. Major critics included Albert Londres, Félicien Challaye, and Paul Monet, whose books and articles were widely read.

== See also ==
- French Third Republic#Interwar period
- 1919 in France
- 1920 in France
- 1921 in France
- 1922 in France
- 1923 in France
- 1924 in France
- 1925 in France
- 1926 in France
- 1927 in France
- 1928 in France
- 1929 in France
- 1930 in France
- 1931 in France
- 1932 in France
- 1933 in France
- 1934 in France
- 1935 in France
- 1936 in France
- 1937 in France
- 1938 in France
- 1939 in France
- Interwar period, worldwide
- Interwar Britain
