= Ordre Nouveau (1930s) =

Non-conformist political organization in 1930s France

The Ordre Nouveau (New Order) was a non-conformist political organization in the 1930s in France, created by Alexandre Marc and influenced by Robert Aron and Arnaud Dandieu's works. Some of its noted members included the future French leader Charles de Gaulle, Jean Coutrot, Charles Spinasse, and Henri Daniel-Rops.
