= Non-conformists of the 1930s =

Avantgarde movement during the inter-war period in France

The non-conformists of the 1930s were groups and individuals during the inter-war period in France that were seeking new solutions to face the political, economical and social crisis. The name was coined in 1969 by the historian Jean-Louis Loubet del Bayle to describe a movement which revolved around Emmanuel Mounier's personalism. They attempted to find a "third (communitarian) alternative" between socialism and capitalism, and opposed both liberalism/parliamentarism/democracy and fascism.

== Main currents ==
Three main currents of non-conformists may be distinguished:

- The journal Esprit, founded in 1931 by Emmanuel Mounier and which was the main mouthpiece of personalism.
- The Ordre nouveau (New Order) group, created by Alexandre Marc and influenced by Robert Aron and Arnaud Dandieu's works. Charles de Gaulle would have some contacts with them between the end of 1934 and the beginning of 1935. Jean Coutrot, who became during the Popular Front vice-president of the Committee of Scientific Organisation of Labour of the Minister Charles Spinasse, participated in the technical reunions of Ordre nouveau.
- The Jeune Droite (Young Right — a term coined by Mounier) that gathered young intellectuals who had more or less broken with the monarchist Action Française, including Jean de Fabrègues, Jean-Pierre Maxence, Thierry Maulnier, Maurice Blanchot, as well as the journals Les Cahiers, Réaction pour l'ordre, La Revue française or La Revue du Siècle.

These young intellectuals (most were about 25 years old) all considered that France was confronted by a "civilisation crisis" and opposed, despite their differences, what Mounier called the "established disorder" (le désordre établi). The latter was represented by capitalism, individualism, economic liberalism and materialism. Opposed both to Fascism and to Communism (qualified for the first as a "false Fascist-spiritualism" and for the latter as plain materialism), they aimed at creating the conditions of a "spiritual revolution" which would simultaneously transform Man and things. They called for a "New Order", beyond individualism and collectivism, oriented towards a "federalist," "communautary and personalist" organisation of social relations.

The Non-Conformists were influenced both by French socialism, in particular by Proudhonism (an important influence of Ordre nouveau) and by Social Catholicism, which permeated Esprit and the Jeune Droite. They inherited from both currents a form of scepticism towards politics, which explains some anti-statism stances, and renewed interest in social and economical transformations. Foreign influences were more restricted, and were limited to the discovery of the "precursors of existentialism" (Kierkegaard, Nietzsche, Heidegger, Max Scheler) and contacts between Ordre nouveau and several members of the German Conservative Revolutionary movement. They were in favor of decentralization, underscored the importance of intermediary bodies, and opposed finance capitalism.

The movement was close to liberalism in the attention given to civil society and in its distrust of the state; but it also criticized liberal individualism and its negligence of "intermediate bodies" (family, village, etc. — the reactionary writer Maurice Barrès also insisted on the latter). They were characterized by the will to find a "Third Way" between Socialism and Capitalism, individualism and collectivism, idealism and materialism and the left–right distinction in politics.

After the February 6, 1934 riots organized by far-right leagues, the Non-Conformists split toward various directions. Bertrand de Jouvenel made the link between the Non-Conformists and the supporters of planisme, a new economical theory invented by the Belgian Henri de Man, as well as with the technocratic Groupe X-Crise. They influenced both Vichy's Révolution nationale (Jeune France, Ecole des cadres d'Uriage, etc.) and political programs of the Resistance (Combat, Défense de la France, OCM, etc.) In November 1941, René Vincent, in charge of Vichy censorship services, created the journal Idées (1941–44) which gathered the Non-Conformists who supported Marshal Philippe Pétain's regime.

== Post-war legacy ==
After World War II, many of these Non-Conformists (Robert Aron, Daniel-Rops, Jean de Fabrègues, Denis de Rougemont, Alexandre Marc, Thierry Maulnier) became activists of European federalist movements. The founder of Ordre nouveau, Alexandre Marc, became in 1946 the first secretary of the Union of European Federalists. He would then create the Centre International de Formation Européenne (CIFE) in 1954, which lives on to this day.

Breaking with part of its legacy, Esprit involved itself in New Left movements and would also influence in the 1970s the "Second Left", gathered around the Unified Socialist Party (PSU).

After May '68, some environmentalist movements renewed with this "spirit of the 1930s" (in particular Denis de Rougemont or Jacques Ellul). They have also influenced Christian Democracy.

Abroad, the Non-Conformists found an audience in Quebec between the 1930s to the 1970s or among Eastern European dissidents, and would also influence Catholic circles in the second half of the 20th century.

== See also ==
- Claude Chevalley, a non-conformist who became a member of the Bourbaki group
- Distributism, an economic movement of a similar milieu
- Neosocialism
- Personalism
- Planisme
- Groupe X-Crise
- Interwar France
- Greatest Generation
- Generation Gap
- Conservative Revolution
- Nouvelle Droite

== Bibliography ==
- Robert Aron, Décadence de la nation française (1931)
- Arnaud Dandieu, Le Cancer américain (1931)
- Daniel-Rops, Les Années tournantes (1932) and Le Monde sans âme
- Alexandre Marc, Jeune Europe (1933)
- Aron & Dandieu, La Révolution nécessaire (1933)
- Denis de Rougemont, Politique de la personne (1934)
