= Jean-Marie Domenach =

French writer and intellectual (1922–1997)

Jean-Marie Domenach (French: [dɔmənak]; 13 February 1922 – 5 July 1997) was a French writer and intellectual. He was noted as a left-wing and Catholic thinker.

Domenach was born in Lyon, where he studied at the Lycée du Parc. In 1949, he became an editor of Esprit, the literary and political journal of personalism and non-conformism founded in 1932 by Emmanuel Mounier. In 1956, Domenach became chief editor. He voluntarily retired from Esprit in 1977, at 54, and began writing and teaching at the university level.

Opposed to torture during the Algerian War, he also held a meeting denouncing the 1961 Paris massacre.

In February 1971, Domenach co-founded the Groupe d'Information sur les Prisons (GIP) along with historian Pierre Vidal-Naquet and philosopher Michel Foucault.

He died in Paris in 1997, aged 75.

== Works ==
- Gilbert Dru: celui qui croyait au ciel (1947)
- La propagande politique (1950)
- Communism in Western Europe (1951; with Mario Einaudi and Aldo Garosci)
- Barrès par lui-même (1954)
- Yougoslavie (1960; with Alain Pontault)
- Le retour du tragique (1963)
- The Catholic Avant-Garde: French Catholicism Since World War II (1967; with Robert de Montvalon)
- Il vicolo cieco della sinistra (1970; with Thomas Molnar and Augusto Del Noce)
- Emmanuel Mounier (1972)
- Le christianisme éclaté (1974; with Michel de Certeau)
- Le Sauvage et l' Ordinateur (1976)
- Ce que je crois (1978)
- L'autogestion c'est pas de la tarte (Maquis du Vercors) (1978; with Marcel Mermoz)
- Malraux (1979) with others
- Enquête sur idées contemporaines (1981)
- La Violence et ses causes (Unesco, 1980) as Violence and its Causes (1981)
- Lettre à mes ennemis de classe (1984)
- Des idées pour la politique (1988)
- Ce qu'il faut enseigner: pour un nouvel enseignement général dans le secondaire (1989)
- Approches de la modernité (1990)
- Europe: le défi culturel (1990)
- À temps et à contretemps (1991)
- Une morale sans moralisme (1992)
- La responsabilité, essai sur le fondement du civisme (1994)
- Le crépuscule de la culture française? (1995)
- Regarder la France. Essai sur le malaise français (1997)
- Gilbert Dru, un chrétien résistant (1998; with Bernard Comte, Christian Rendu, and Denise Rendu)
- Beaucoup de gueule et peu d'or. Journal d'un réfractaire (1944–1977) (2001)
