= Union of European Federalists =

Non-governmental organisation, campaigning for a Federal Europe

- Formation: September 1946
- Type: Advocacy group
- Purpose: Advocate Federalism
- Headquarters: Brussels, Belgium
- Region served: European Union
- President: Domènec Ruiz Devesa
- Website: www.federalists.eu

The Union of European Federalists (UEF) is an international non-profit association originally founded in 1946 and refounded in 1973, promoting the advent of a European federal state based on the idea of unity in diversity. In 1946, it brought together a number of initiatives, particularly from the Resistance, aimed at creating a European federation, including the Movimento Federalista Europeo created the day after the fall of Benito Mussolini in Milan from 27 to 29 August 1943, under the impetus of the opponent Altiero Spinelli, among others, and the French Committee for the European Federation created in Lyon by members of the "Francs-tireurs" group in June 1944.

== History ==
Following two Conferences, the first one held in Hertenstein (municipality of Weggis near Zürich in Switzerland), gathering 78 representatives of federalist movements from 16 European countries in September 1946, and the second one in Luxembourg in October of the same year, these groups, who shared the common belief that only a European Federation based on the idea of unity in diversity could prevent a repetition of the suffering and destruction of the two world wars, so they adopted a declaration-programme which was based on this idea. Federalists believed that only a common effort of European citizens working towards this goal could create a peaceful and democratic Europe guaranteeing freedom and the protection of human rights.

The foundation of the UEF followed the two Conference of Hertenstein (municipality of Weggis near Zürich in Switzerland), gathering 78 representatives of federalist movements from 16 European countries in September 1946, and in Luxembourg in October the same year. These groups held the common belief that only a European Federation based on the idea of unity in diversity could prevent a repetition of the suffering and destruction of the two world wars, so they adopted a declaration-programme which was based on this idea. Federalists believed that only a common effort of European citizens working towards this goal could create a peaceful and democratic Europe guaranteeing freedom and the protection of human rights. The federalists decided to found the European Union of Federalists (UEF). Its foundation formally took place in December 1946 in Paris.

At a second meeting in Luxembourg these groups agreed on establishing a permanent European secretariat in Paris and another one in New York City for global federalists. But it was in Paris, on 15 and 16 December 1946 that UEF was officially brought into life, its function being to co-ordinate and intensify the activities of the different movements and to organise them into a federal structure.

The UEF's founding Congress took place in Montreux (Switzerland) from 27 to 31 August 1947. The motions adopted defined the principles of fédéralisme to which the organisation adhered and its objectives for European unification.

Among the association's first leaders were Alexandre Marc, Denis de Rougemont, Altiero Spinelli, Henri Frenay.

Together with the United Europe Movement of Winston Churchill, the UEF participates in the organisation The Hague in May 1948 of the Congress of Europe, in which its ideas were influential, but in a minority. Still today, the UEF keeps is part of the European Movement European Movement International that resulted from that Congress.

After getting a legal status UEF campaigned for the European Federal Pact. It consisted of an attempt to transform the Advisory Assembly of the Council of Europe into the Constituent Assembly of the European Federation. The fundamental tool was a petition, signed by thousands of citizens across Europe and a large number of eminent people in political, intellectual and scientific life, which asked the Advisory Assembly to draw up a text for a federal pact, and recommend its ratification to the member states of the Council of Europe. UEF also campaigned for the ratification of the European Defence Community and for the establishment of a political community.

After rejection of the EDC project the federalists became increasingly divided as to the strategy to be followed by the U.E.F. between those who, following Altiero Spinelli (1907–1986), favoured the constitutional approach, and those who preferred a step-by-step approach. The former could not be satisfied with a mere common market; the latter fully supported it. This conflict led to a split of the UEF in July 1956 and its division into two organisations: the "Mouvement Fédéraliste Européen" (M.F.E.), formed from militants of the former constitutional persuasion, and the "Action Européenne Fédéraliste" (A.E.F.) bringing together those of the latter.

But once the customs union had been established, bringing with it the prospect of developing into an economic and monetary union, the two federalist organisations came to agree on the desirability of coming together to relaunch their political activities, built around the campaign for direct elections to the European Parliament. This strategic idea, propounded by the Italian federalists, quickly became the joint platform of all the federalist organisations that met in April 1973, thus recreating UEF.

Activities of UEF included public demonstrations attracting thousands of participants. For example, the demonstration in conjunction with the European Council in Rome in December 1975, where it was decided that the European election would be held even without the participation of the United Kingdom and Denmark (although in the end, they did take part), a demonstration with 5,000 participants in Strasbourg on 17 July 1979 in front of the seat of the European Parliament, to coincide with its first session after its election in June the demonstration coinciding with the European Council in Fontainebleau on 25 June 1984 and the spectacular demonstration in Milan – its 100,000 participants make it the biggest popular demonstration in the history of the federalist struggle – in conjunction with the European Council of 28 and 29 June 1985, where the majority decided to call an Intergovernmental Conference to review to Community treaties.

The fall of the Berlin Wall, the end of the Cold War, German reunification and the ratification of the Maastricht Treaty led to the UEF campaign for European Democracy which included the desire to eliminate border controls between the countries of the European Union, parallelism between widening and deepening, strengthening of the roles of the European Parliament and the European Commission, extension of majority voting and the removal of governmental monopoly over the constituent function.

An important part of the history of UEF was the Campaign for the Federal European Constitution in Nice in which 10,000 people, including hundreds of local administrators, participated.

=== Presidents ===
Presidents of the Executive Board

- Hendrik Brugmans 1947–1949
- Henry Frenay 1950–1952
- Altiero Spinelli 1955–1956
- Grigore Gafencu 1956
- Alexandre Marc 1957
- Raymond Rifflet 1959–1964
- Mario Albertini 1966

Presidents (until 1966 of the "Presidents of the Central Committee")

- Henri Genet 1947
- Henry Frenay 1948–1949
- Hendrik Brugmans 1950
- Eugen Kogon 1950–1952
- Henry Frenay 1955
- Grigore Gafencu 1956
- Enzo Giacchero 1957
- Enzo Giacchero 1959–1962
- Etienne Hirsch 1964–1972
- Etienne Hirsch – J.H.C Molenaar 1972–1975
- Mario Albertini 1975–1982
- John Pinder 1984–1987
- Francesco Rossolillo 1989–1994
- Jo Leinen 1997–2004
- Mercedes Bresso 2006–2008
- Andrew Duff 2008–2013
- Elmar Brok 2013–2018
- Sandro Gozi 2018–2023
- Domènec Ruiz Devesa 2023–2028

=== Secretaries General ===
- Raymond Silva 1947–1948
- Albert Lohest 1949–1950
- Guglielmo Usellini 1950–1957
- André Delmas 1959–1962
- Orio Giarini 1962–1967
- Ludo Dierickx 1969
- Caterina Chizzola 1972–1989
- Gérard Vissels 1992–1994
- Bruno Boissière 1997–2004
- Friedhelm Frischenschlager 2005–2006
- Joan Marc Simon 2007–2010
- Christian Wenning 2010–2014
- Paolo Vacca 2014–2020
- Anna Echterhoff 2020–2023
- Luisa Trumellini 2023–2024
- Ilaria Caria 2024–2025
- Mathilde Baudouin 2025-2028

==== Deputy general secretary ====
- Henri Koch-Kent 1946. Also active in its founding, at Luxembourg meeting.

== Organization ==
UEF consists of constituent organisations that are autonomous centres of UEF activities, reaching the EU citizens and spreading the UEF message to them by organising various activities in their countries. Constituent organisations are free to take up any activities within the general political framework of UEF at the European level.

=== Congress ===
The Congress is the 'general assembly' of UEF. It meets every two years; it consists of delegates of the UEF constituent organisations. It determines the policy of UEF, elects the UEF president, modifies provisions of the Statutes and elects half of the Federal Committee members.

=== Federal Committee ===
The FC consists of members of whom 50% are elected directly by the UEF Congress and 50% by the constituent organisations. The members are elected to serve until the next UEF Congress. The FC determines the UEF political direction and activities between the Congresses. It organises the Congress, approves the annual budget and final account balances, draws up the rules of procedure of UEF, and elects the UEF Bureau and Treasurer.

=== Bureau ===
Elected by the Federal Committee for a period of two years, the Bureau carries out the decisions of and is accountable to the Federal Committee.

=== Conference of Representatives ===
It is convened upon the request of the UEF Bureau or at least two constituent organisations. The Conference gathers the representatives of the constituent organisations and of UEF supranational (namely, the President, Secretary-General and Treasurer). It presents its proposals to the Federal Committee and has an advisory and co-ordinating role. The Conference also determines the membership fee.

=== President ===
The UEF president is elected by the UEF Congress by absolute majority vote. He is also the President of the Federal Committee and of the UEF Bureau. Currently the UEF president is the Spanish Domènec Ruiz Devesa.

=== Treasurer ===
Elected by the Federal Committee on the nomination of the Bureau, They are responsible for the management of the funds. They are accountable to the Federal Committee. The current UEF Treasurer is Antonio Argenziano.

=== Secretary-General ===
The UEF Secretary-General is responsible for running the UEF secretariat and carrying out the decisions delegated to them by the organs of UEF. They participate in the meetings of the organs of UEF without the right to vote. They are appointed by the Federal Committee on recommendation of the Bureau. Currently the UEF Secretary-General is Mathilde Baudouin.

=== Arbitration Board ===
Consists of seven members elected by the Congress. It ensures the application of the Statutes and serves as an arbiter in case of disputes within the organisation.

== Member organisations ==
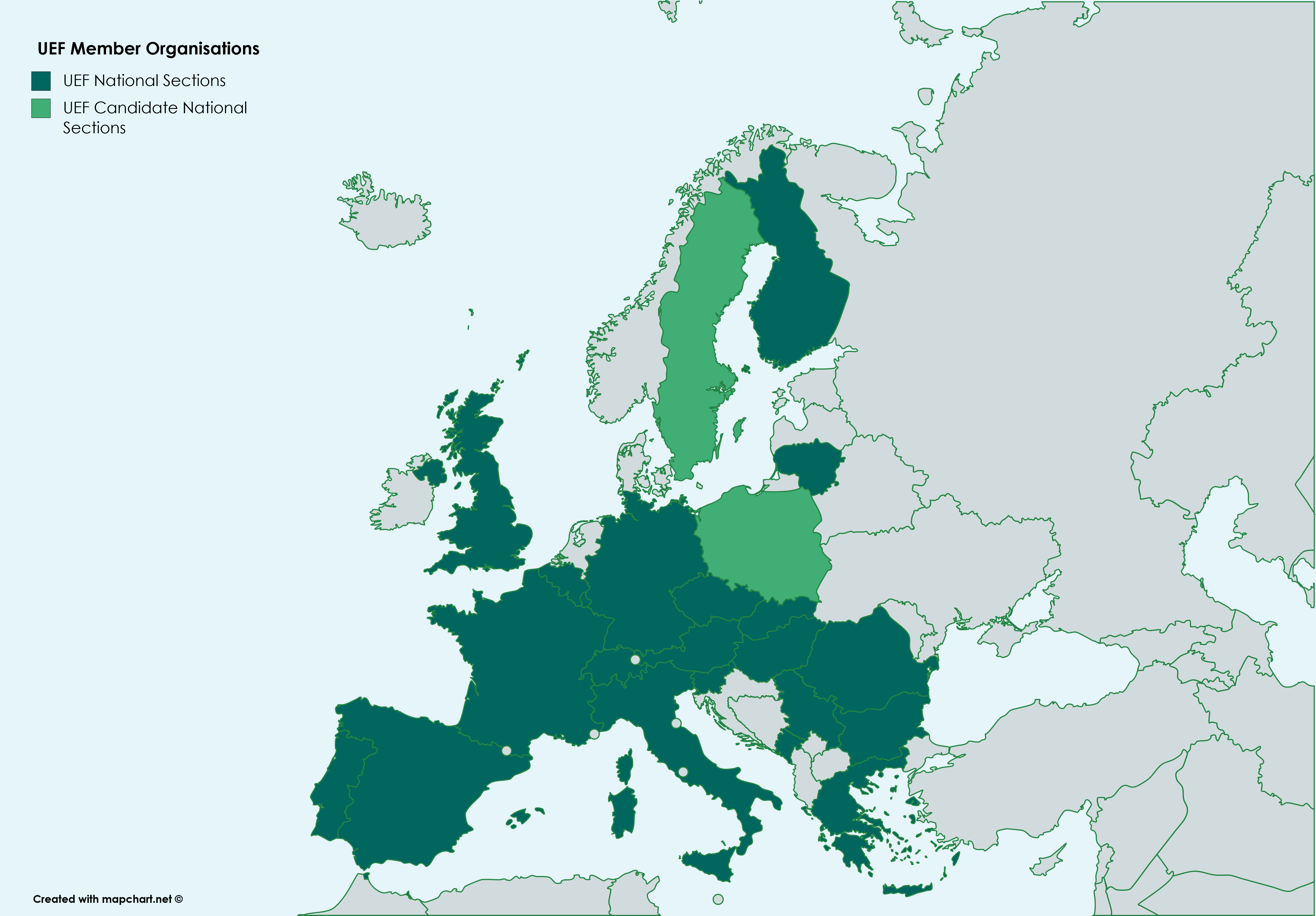
States with member organisations of the Union of European Federalists in 2017

- Europäische Föderalistische Bewegung Österreich (UEF Austria)
- U.E.F. België / U.E.F. Belgique (UEF Belgium)
- U.E.F. Balgarija (UEF Bulgaria)
- Unie evropských federalistů v České republice (U.E.F. Czech Republic)
- European Federalist Movement of Cyprus (UEF Cyprus)
- Europa-Union Deutschland (UEF Germany)
- Eurooppafederalistit (U.E.F. Finland)
- European Federalist Movement Greece (UEF Greece)
- Union des fédéralistes européens (U.E.F. France)
- Európai Föderalisták Uniója (UEF Hungary)
- Movimento Federalista Europeo (UEF Italy)
- Europos federalistai Lietuvoje (UEF Lithuania)
- UEF Luxembourg
- UEF Crna Gora (UEF Montenegro)
- UEF Portugal (UEF Portugal)
- UEF Romania
- Únia európskych federalistov (UEF Slovakia)
- Unión de Europeístas y Federalistas de España (UEF Spain)
- Unija evropskih federalista (UEF Serbia)
- Europafederalisterna (UEF Sweden)
- Mouvement européen Suisse/Europäische Bewegung Schweiz/Movimento europeo Svizzera (UEF Switzerland)
- Federal Union (UEF United Kingdom)
- UEF Europe Groupe

== Mission ==
The mission of the UEF is the following:

- To raise the awareness of the public about European issues, the UEF is organising public debates, seminars, info stands, campaign and street actions on key European issues and developments.
- To exercise pressure on the like-minded politicians by lobbying actions, establishing Platforms (aiming to spread the understanding of federalism) and initiating debates in the European and national parliaments.
- To spread the ideas through a strong communication via press releases, the UEF website and newsletter and other policy statements to the widest European public and actors.
- To cooperate with others non-governmental organisations (NGOs) and especially of the European Civil Society like the Young European Federalists (JEF) and the European Movement and finally to put pressure on politicians by organising public manifestations.

== See also ==
- Jeunes Européens Fédéralistes
- Federal Europe
- The Spinelli Group
- European Movement
- Non-Conformist Movement
- Federalist flag
- Centre for Studies on Federalism
- World Federalist Movement/Institute for Global Policy
