= Sillon =

Sillon (French for furrow or strip) may refer to:

- Le Sillon, a liberal-leftist Catholic movement in France.
- Sillon industriel (industrial strip), a term for an industrial zone in French speaking countries, usually referring to an area in Belgium.
