= Robert Francis =

Robert Francis may refer to:

- Robert Francis (barrister) (born 1950), British barrister specialising in medical law
- Robert Francis (musician) (born 1987), American singer/songwriter and producer
- Robert Francis (poet) (1901–1987), American poet
- Robert Francis (actor) (1930–1955), American actor
- Robert Francis (writer) (1909–1946), French writer, winner of the 1934 Prix Femina
- Bobby Francis (born 1958), former ice hockey head coach
- Bob Francis (radio presenter) (1939–2016), Australian radio presenter and talk back host
- Bob Francis (referee) (born 1942), New Zealand rugby union referee and mayor
- Robert Francis (politician), British politician and hotelier
- Robert Francis (MP), member of parliament for Staffordshire, c.1400

== See also ==
- Robert Francis Prevost, head of the Catholic Church since 2025
