= Robert Aron =

French historian and writer (1898–1975)

- Born: 25 May 1898; Le Vésinet, France
- Died: 19 April 1975 (aged 76); Paris, France
- Education: Lycée Condorcet

Robert Aron (/ɑːˈrɒn/; French: [ʁɔbɛʁ aʁɔ̃]; 25 May 1898 – 19 April 1975) was a French historian and writer who wrote several books on politics and European history.

== Early life and career ==
Robert Aron was born in Le Vésinet on 25 May 1898 to an upper-class Jewish family from eastern France.^{:132} He attended the Lycée Condorcet and served in the French Army during World War I. He was wounded in action in 1918.

== Interwar Period ==
In 1922, while at university studying for a degree in Languages and Classics, Aron was the President of the Cercle International d'Etudiants.^{:132} In this role he organised a series of lectures focused on avant-garde literature, music, film and painting. Among the participants were Jean Cocteau and Erik Satie. The series' success attracted the attention the Nouvelle Revue Française, a literary magazine, where he was invited to join the staff as an editor, a position he remained in for many years.^{:132} After university he joined the Éditions Gallimard publishing house where he was briefly secretary to Gaston Gallimard. He also worked as a film critic for the magazine La Revue du Cinéma, and wrote about politics in the foreign service for the Revue des Deux Mondes.

=== Théâtre Alfred Jarry (1926-1928) ===
His interest in avant-garde literature and art and its most modern and provocative expressions during the interwar period, was the impetus behind the creation, together with Antonin Artaud and Roger Vitrac, of the Théâtre Alfred Jarry. Aron primarily worked as a producer for the theatre, which mounted four productions from 1926-1928. His experience left him questioning the revolutionary attributes of art. In a response to a disruption of theatre's production of Strindberg's A Dream Play by members of the Surrealist movement, Aron wrote

the Surrealists, whatever attributes they may have, by remaining within the literary or artistic domain, incur no risks except that which is most sought after as a consecration of their childish acts, namely a short stay in the police cells.

For Aron, the work of the Théâtre Alfred Jarry, 'provoked the only dangerous and disturbances of a Surrealist nature' in the last two years, and were almost 'Revolutionary disturbances'.

=== Ordre Nouveau (1929-1938) ===
In 1927, he became reacquainted with a fellow former student of the Lycée Condorcet, Arnaud Dandieu. Their work together in political and philosophical research spawned three works in the early 1930s: Décadence de la Nation Française (1931), Le Cancer Américain (1931) and La Révolution Nécessaire (1933). Those works constituted the principal theoretical base on which he created the group "Ordre Nouveau" (The New Order) in 1929, and its literary magazine Esprit represented one of the most original expressions of the Nonconformist Movement during the 1930s. Closely collaborating with Dandieu until his death in 1933, Aron took a very active part in all of the activities of Ordre Nouveau until its end in 1938. Thereafter, Aron's activities and viewpoints would be influenced by those experiences.

== World War II ==
In 1940, the advent of World War II interrupted his editorial work at the Nouvelle Revue Française. In 1941 he was arrested in one of the Nazis' first anti-semitic operations and held in the Mérignac camp near Bordeaux. After being released, he was not allowed to travel to Paris and instead moved to Lyon, where he became involved, through his friend Jean Rigaut, in preparations for the AAllied invasion of North Africa.

Soon after he was able to escape to Algiers, thanks to Jean Jardin, a former contributor to l'Ordre Nouveau, and at the time director of Pierre Laval's cabinet. In Algiers, Robert Aron became a part of one of the first administrative teams of General Giraud and then General Charles de Gaulle. With Lucie Faure and Jean Amrouche he founded a new literary review, La Nef ("The Nave"), for which he would continue writing until 1952. In 1944–1945, he contributed to the creation of the "Federation" Movement and would remain an active supporter of the French Federalist Movement until his death by regularly collaborating in the monthly publication Le XX^{e} siècle Fédéraliste, and participating in initiatives to create a federation of European States. Aron took up editorial duties again after the Liberation of France, most notably at the publishing houses Librairie Académique Perrin and later, Éditions Fayard.

== Postwar Period ==
In 1950, he undertook an important work of historical research on contemporary French history: Histoire de Vichy [History of Vichy] (1954). Nicholas Birns, discussing the English translation, termed it a "neglected but pivotal book". The original French edition was over 700 pages and relied mainly on the testimonies of eye-witnesses and on the records of the High Court. It was the standard work of reference on Vichy for more than fifteen years and the original edition sold 53,000 copies between 1954 and 1981. Aron argued that in Philippe Pétain's view "the armistice was not and could not be anything more than a pause, allowing France to subsist temporarily while awaiting the outcome of the war between England and the Axis...for Laval, the armistice was supposed to have paved the way for a reversal of alliances". Aron therefore argued that there were "two Vichy's", Pétain's and Laval's. He also claimed that the Vichy government played a "double game" between the Allies and the Axis by holding secret talks with the Allies while officially collaborating. Aron attacked the "crimes" committed by the Resistance and he claimed that they had summarily executed "thirty to forty thousand people". Charles de Gaulle wrote to Aron disputing this figure, citing 10,000 as the more accurate estimate. According to Henry Rousso, Aron's book was made obsolete by Robert Paxton's Vichy France (1972).

His Histoire de la Libération (1959, "History of the Liberation") was translated into English as De Gaulle Before Paris (trans. Humphrey Hare, Putnam 1962) and he also wrote the Histoire de l'Epuration (1967–1975, "History of the Purges").

An agnostic during the 1930s, Aron returned to his Jewish faith after 1945 and participated in formal Jewish-Christian dialogue. His book The God of the Beginnings (New York: Morrow, 1966) explores the origins of religion and its development in the traditions of the Old Testament (e.g., Abraham, Moses, the Sinai Covenant). He also wrote books about Jesus's identity as a Jew, including Jesus of Nazareth: The Hidden Years (New York: Morrow, 1962), and The Jewish Jesus (New York Maryknoll, 1971). In 1974, he was elected a member of the Académie française (number 650) but he died suddenly of a heart attack on 19 April 1975, before he was able to attend his public acceptance ceremony.

His final work, Léopold III ou le choix impossible ("Leopold III or the Impossible Choice"), looked at the history of the Belgian monarch Leopold III and the German invasion of Belgium in May 1940 and was published posthumously in 1977.
