= Henri de Man =

Belgian politician (1885–1953)

Hendrik de Man
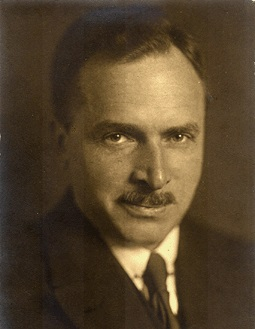

President of the Belgian Labour Party
- In office 1938–1940
- Preceded by: Emile Vandervelde
- Succeeded by: Party abolished

Personal details
- Born: 17 November 1885 Antwerp, Belgium
- Died: 20 June 1953 (aged 67) Greng, Switzerland
- Party: Belgian Labour Party
- Occupation: Politician

Hendrik "Henri" de Man (17 November 1885 – 20 June 1953) was a Belgian politician and leader of the Belgian Labour Party (POB-BWP). He was one of the leading socialist theoreticians of his period and, during the German occupation of Belgium during World War II, and collaborated with the occupying Nazis through his role in the Belgian government.

== World War I and the interwar period ==
A politically active socialist, he nevertheless supported the Allied cause in World War I and served with the Belgian army. After the war, he taught sociology for a time at the University of Washington in the United States. He returned to Belgium and started a workers' education school. Later he moved to Germany, where he taught for some years at the University of Frankfurt. He was at odds there with the predominantly left-wing and Communist sentiments of his colleagues. He was allied with Eugen Diederichs, a conservative publisher in Jena.

Returning to Belgium after the Reichstag fire (his books were not popular with Hitler, and de Man was always a maverick relative to others' ideologies) he became Vice President of the Belgian Labour Party (POB-BWP). Upon the death of Emile Vandervelde in 1938, he assumed its presidency. He was Minister of Finance from 1936 to 1938.

His views on socialism and his revision of Marxism were controversial. His promotion of the idea of "planisme", or planning, was widely influential in the early 1930s, in particular among the Non-Conformist Movement in France, a movement also called the Third Way; he was connected briefly to the Personalist Emmanuel Mounier.

The doctrine of Henri de Man intended to overcome the successive crises of capitalism by the nationalization of bank credit and an elevation of the degree of authority of the State in financial affairs, while preserving the structures of a capitalist economic system. The “planism” refuted the socialization of the means of production and the construction of a classless society, but on the contrary sought to encourage the private sector by freeing it from certain monopolies entrusted to the State and making it the protector of free competition and individual initiative. From a tactical point of view, marked by the crushing of the German Social Democrats by Hitler, which he attributes to the defection of the middle classes towards the NSDAP, de Man thought it necessary to move towards a rapprochement with other democratic parties.

== Plan de Man ==
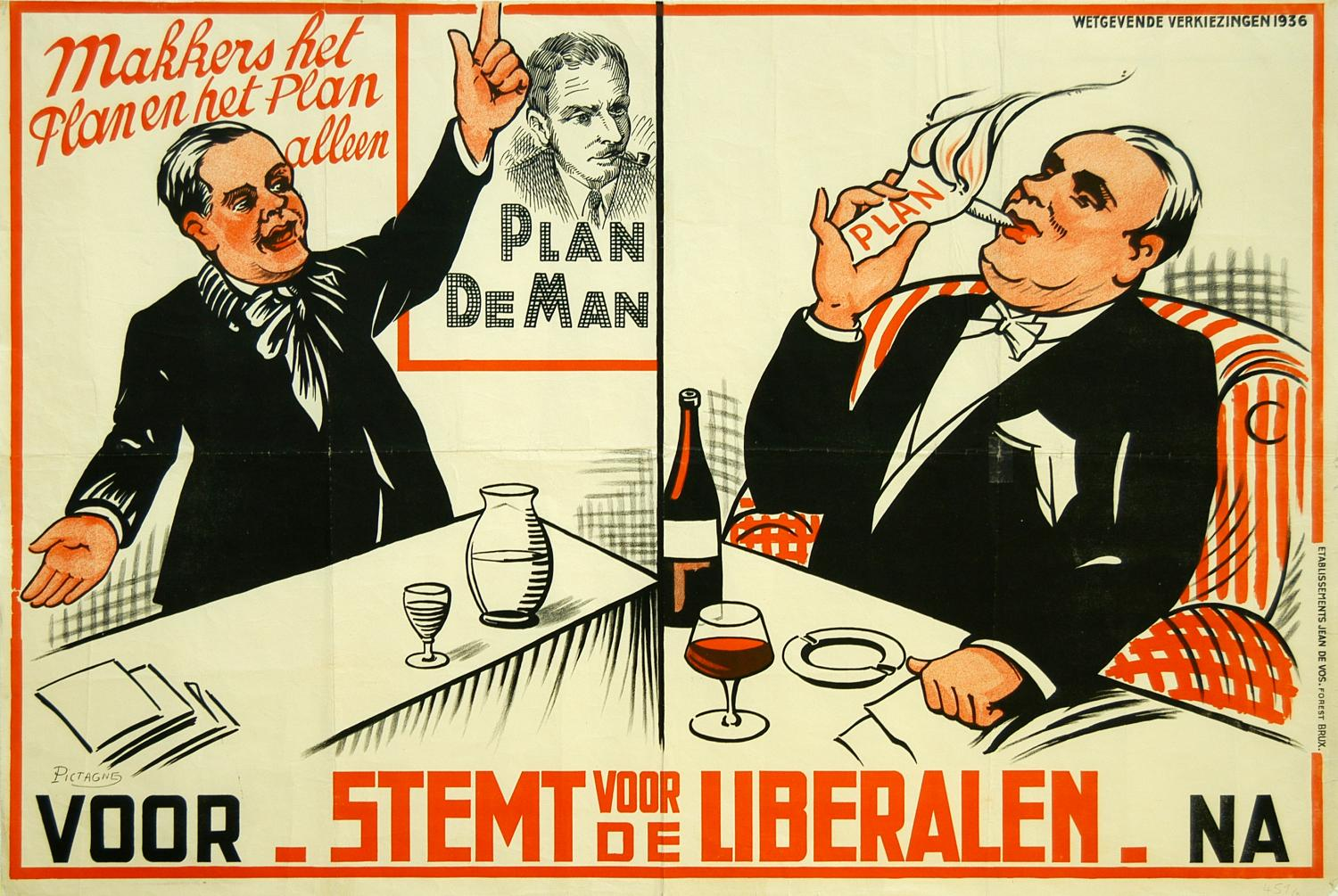
Liberal election poster for the 1936 elections mocking de Man's plan as nothing more than rhetoric used by a fellow POB member Paul-Henri Spaak to light his cigarette

In 1933 the Labour Party accepted his Plan of Labour with an overwhelming majority. This plan sought to overcome the economic crisis through structural and economic reforms. It proposed nationalising finance, credit, monopolies and large landholdings, while giving the state greater control over the private economy. Its aim was to create a planned, democratic economic system that would put the general interest above private profit. The plan became widely known as 'Het Plan de Man' and was an example of planism.

== German occupation ==
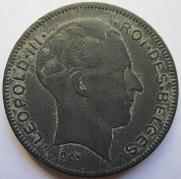
De Man served as advisor to King Leopold III

De Man was an adviser to King Leopold III and his mother, Queen Elisabeth. Having lived extensively in Germany, and "loving" the country as he said, throughout the 1930s in Belgium he advocated accommodating Hitler's expansionist policies to save Belgium from the crushing fate it had previously suffered in World War I, the policy that was called appeasement by other democratic nations. After the "capitulation" of the Belgian Army in 1940, he issued a manifesto to POB-BWP members, welcoming the German occupation as a field of neutralist action during the war: "For the working classes and for socialism, this collapse of a decrepit world, far from being a disaster, is a deliverance."

He was involved, together with the leaders of the catholic and liberal unions, in setting up an umbrella trade union, the Unie van Hand- en Geestesarbeiders/Union des Travailleurs Manuels et Intellectuels (UHGA-UTMI) which would unify the existing trade unions and moreover aim at the integration of manual and intellectual workers. From 1941 onwards, this Union evolved towards outright collaboration: Catholic and liberal leaders withdrew, and the German occupying authorities imposed a ban on Hendrik De Man speaking publicly.

He eventually was mistrusted by Flemish Nazi collaborators (for his Belgicist views). Seeing he had lost his grip on events, he went into self-imposed exile in la Cluzaz, in the Haute Savoie region of France.

== Exile and death ==
In August 1944, he crossed the border to Switzerland and lived in Bern and in Greng (Murtensee).

He died with his young wife in 1953 in a collision between his car and a train.

He was convicted in absentia of treason after the war and sentenced to 20 years in prison.

== Bibliography ==
=== Publications ===
- Au pays du Taylorisme, Bruxelles, éd. "Le Peuple", 1919.
- Zur Psychologie des Sozialismus, Jena, E. Diederichs, 1927.
- Au-delà du marxisme, Bruxelles, L'Églantine, 1927. (Rééd., Paris, Alcan, 1929; Seuil, 1974)
- Socialisme et marxisme, Bruxelles, L'Églantine, 1928.
- Joie du travail, enquête basée sur des témoignages d'ouvriers et d'employés, Paris, Librairie Félix Alcan, 1930.
- Réflexions sur l'économie dirigée, Bruxelles et Paris, L'Églantine, 1932.
- Nationalisme et socialisme, Paris, [éditeur non indiqué], 1932.
- Marx redécouvert, [Der neu entdeckte Marx], traduction de l'allemand par Michel Brélaz, Genève, Association pour l'étude de l'œuvre d'Henri de Man, 1980 [1932].
- Le Socialisme constructif, traduit de l'allemand par L. C. Herbert, Paris, Paris, Librairie Félix Alcan, 1933.
- Pour un plan d'action, Paris, M. Rivière, [1934].
- Le Plan du travail, Bruxelles, Institut d'économie européenne, 1934. Éditions Labor, 1935.
- L'exécution du plan du travail, Anvers, de Sikkel, 1935.
- L'idée socialiste suivi du Plan de travail, traduction d'Alexandre Kojevnikov et Henry Corbin, Paris, Bernard Grasset, [1935].
- Corporatisme et socialisme, Bruxelles, Éditions Labor, 1935.
- Masses et chefs, Bruxelles, La Nouvelle églantine, 1937.
- (avec Lucovic Zoretti, Léo Moulin, M. Somerhausen et Georges Lefranc, Les problèmes d'ensemble du fascisme, semaine d'études d'Uccle-Bruxelles, 10–15 juillet 1934, Paris, Centre confédéral d'éducation ouvrière, [1939].
- Après coup, mémoires, Bruxelles et Paris, Éditions de la Toison d'or et PUF, [1941] (plusieurs rééditions).
- Herinneringen, Antwerpen, de Sikkel, Arnheim, van Loghum Slaterus, 1941.
- Réflexions sur la paix, Paris et Bruxelles, Éditions de la Toison d'Or, 1942.
- Cahiers de ma montagne, Bruxelles, Éditions de la Toison d'or, 1944.
- Au-delà du nationalisme. Vers un gouvernement mondial, Genève, Éditions du Cheval ailé, 1946.
- Cavalier seul. 45 années de socialisme européen, Genève, Éditions du Cheval ailé, 1948.
- Jacques Cœur, argentier du Roy, [Jacques Cœur, der konigliche kaufmann Paris, 1950], Tardy, 1951.
- L'Ère des masses et le déclin de la civilisation, [Vermassung und Kulturverfall], traduit de l'allemand par Fernand Delmas, Paris, Flammarion, 1954.
- Le "dossier Léopold III" et autres documents sur la période de la seconde guerre mondiale, édité par Michel Brélaz, Genève, Éditions des Antipodes, 1989.

== Bibliography ==
- Brélaz, Michel; Rens, Ivo (1973). "De Man, Henri". Biographie nationale de Belgique. Vol. 10. Brussels: Académie royale de Belgique. pp. 535–54.
- Dodge, Peter (1966). Beyond Marxism: The Faith and Works of Hendrik de Man. The Hague: Martinus Nijhoff.
- Dodge, Peter, ed. (1979). A Documentary Study of Hendrik De Man, Socialist Critic of Marxism. Princeton: Princeton University Press.
- Sternhell, Zeev (1996). Neither Right nor Left: Fascist Ideology in France. Princeton: Princeton University Press. ISBN 0-691-00629-6., especially chapter 4.
- Horn, Gerd-Rainer (1996). European Socialists Respond to Fascism: Ideology, Activism and Contingency in the 1930s. Oxford: Oxford University Press. pp. 74–95. ISBN 0-19-509374-7.
- Special issue of the Revue européenne des sciences sociales, XII/31 (1974) entitled "Sur l'oeuvre d'Henri de Man" under the direction of Ivo Rens and Michel Brélaz
- Milani, Tommaso (2013). "De metamorfose van een socialist. Hendrik de man en de Eerste Wereldoorlog als een politiek laboratorium". Brood & Rozen. 18 (3). doi:10.21825/br.v18i3.3529.
- Van Haegendoren, Mieke, ed. (2026). Hendrik De Man, visionair of verrader (in Dutch). Antwerpen: Ertsberg. ISBN 9789022342558
