= Hertensteiner Cross =

Flag of 1946 federalist movement in Hertenstein, Switzerland

The Hertensteiner Cross

The Hertensteiner Cross (Hertensteiner Kreuz) was used as a flag by the federalist movements from 14 to 24 September 1946 in Hertenstein, Switzerland.

The symbol was designed by the sculptor Hedwig Frei, and was the first sign used when the Swiss "Europa Union" was founded in 1934. It shows a mirrored double E, which is supposed to symbolise the unification of Europe.

When the Union of European Federalists (UEF) was founded, whereby 31 federations of European Federalists from 14 countries had joined to form an umbrella organisation, the "Hertensteiner Cross" was used as a symbol. The adoption of the Hertensteiner Programme marked the beginning of an international preparation of the European Movement.

The "E" was later also used for the symbol of the wider European Federalists Movement
