= Annie Lacroix-Riz =

French academic, historian

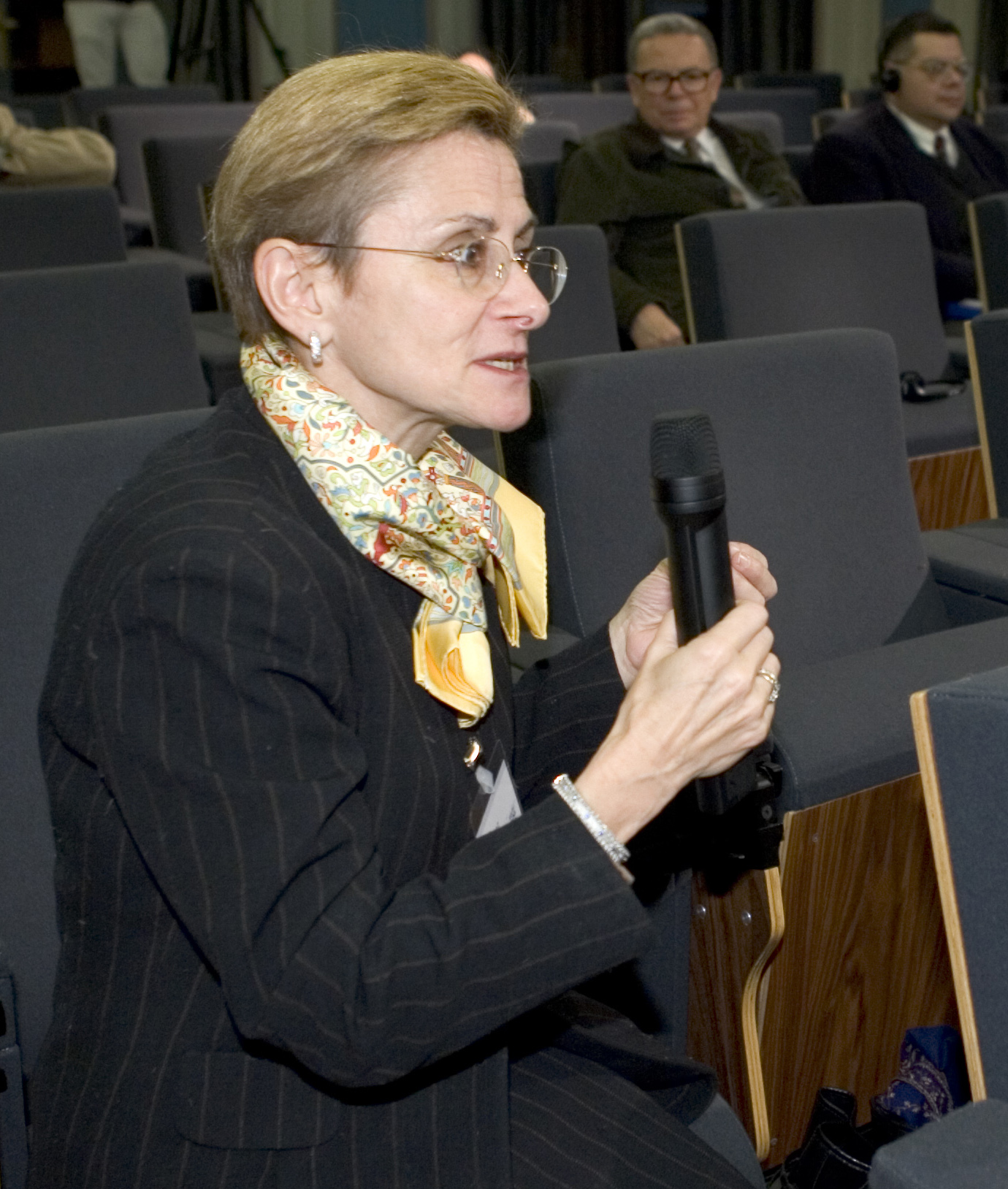
- Annie Lacroix-Riz in 2005
- Born: 1947 (age 78–79)
- Citizenship: French
- Occupation: Historian

Academic background
- Education: École normale supérieure de jeunes filles Paris 1 Panthéon-Sorbonne University

Annie Lacroix-Riz (born 1947) is a French academic Marxist historian specializing in France's relations with Germany and the United States from the 1930s to the 1950s, as well as World War II collaboration.

A former student of the École normale supérieure de jeunes filles and a pupil of Pierre Vilar, she is a professor emeritus of contemporary history at the Paris Diderot University, now part of Paris Cité University.

Lacroix-Riz is a founding member of the Pole of Communist Revival in France (PRCF), established in 2004.

== Work ==
Her research interests are on the political, economic and social history of the French Third Republic and the Vichy regime, the relations between the Vatican and the Reich, as well as the "strategies of the French elites" before and after the Second World War.

In her early works, examining post-war reconstruction of France, Lacroix-Riz studied labor union tensions, investigating issues within the General Confederation of Labour union (French: Confédération Générale du Travail, CGT), the work of the communist minister of Labor and syndicalist Ambroise Croizat on social labor reforms, and American trade unionist Irving Brown’s involvement in the labor movement of France. Subsequent works by Lacroix-Riz probe American influence in Europe, as, for example in Sweden, and in the French colonies of North Africa, questioning the motives of the Marshall Plan.

One of her primary theses is that the profit-driven complicity of French industrial and financial institutions in the rise of Nazi Germany contributed to France's 1940 defeat, paving ultimately the path to U.S ascendancy in Europe.

Lacroix-Riz's writings on the 1930s and WWII, particularly regarding financial and industrial interests, the fascist group La Cagoule, her views on Synarchism and the 1930s famine in Ukrainian have been met with varying responses. On one hand, she is recognized for the detailed and comprehensive nature of her work, rooted in archival evidence. On the other hand, her work sometimes faces criticism for ostensible anti-capitalist bias, a criticism based on her challenges of traditional perspectives and conventional narratives.

== Publications ==
=== Books ===
- Lacroix-Riz, Annie (1983). La CGT de la libération à la scission de 1944–1947 (in French). Paris: Messidor. ISBN 978-2-209-05530-2. OCLC 10615868.
- Lacroix-Riz, Annie (1985). Le choix de Marianne (in French). Paris: Editions Messidor/Editions Sociales. ISBN 978-2-209-05790-0. OCLC 14348463.
- Lacroix-Riz, Annie (1988). Les protectorats d'Afrique du Nord, entre la France et Washington (in French). Paris: Editions L'Harmattan. ISBN 2-7384-0031-0. OCLC 22112682.
- Lacroix-Riz, Annie (1991). L'économie suédoise entre l'Est et l'Ouest (1944-1949). Chemins de la Mémoire (in French). Editions L'Harmattan. ISBN 978-2-296-24361-3. OCLC 26096760.
- Lacroix-Riz, Annie (2010). Le Vatican, l'Europe et le Reich: de la Première Guerre mondiale à la Guerre froide. Hors Collection (in French). Armand Colin. ISBN 978-2-200-24292-3. OCLC 36023846. S2CID 190992696.
- Lacroix-Riz, Annie (1997). Industrialisation et sociétés, 1880-1970 (in French). Paris: Ellipses. ISBN 978-2-7298-6747-8. OCLC 38586248.
- Lacroix-Riz, Annie (2013). Industriels et banquiers français sous l'Occupation. Hors Collection (in French). Armand Colin. ISBN 978-2-200-28891-4. OCLC 875520295. S2CID 160176323.
- Lacroix-Riz, Annie (1 January 2004). L'histoire contemporaine sous influence (in French). Pantin: Le Temps des Cerises. ISBN 978-2-84109-475-2.
- Lacroix-Riz, Annie (2024). Le choix de la défaite: Les élites françaises dans les années 1930 (in French). Dunod. ISBN 978-2-10-087092-9. OCLC 70618320. S2CID 160302124.
- Lacroix-Riz, Annie (2007). L'intégration européenne de la France (in French). Pantin: Le Temps des Cerises. ISBN 978-2-84109-697-8. OCLC 181091839.
- Lacroix-Riz, Annie (2009). De Munich à Vichy: L'assassinat de la Troisième République 1938-1940. Hors Collection (in French). Armand Colin. ISBN 978-2-200-24365-4. OCLC 251904179.
- Lacroix-Riz, Annie (2012). L'histoire contemporaine toujours sous influence (in French). Le Temps des cerises. ISBN 978-2-915854-40-4. OCLC 840466521.
- Lacroix-Riz, Annie (2014). Aux origines du carcan européen: 1900-1960 : la France sous influence allemande et américaine (in French). Le Temps des cerises. ISBN 978-2-37071-001-7. OCLC 880551004.
- Lacroix-Riz, Annie (2020). Scissions syndicales, réformisme et impérialismes dominants, 1939-1949. Collection Histoire (in French). Éditions Delga. ISBN 978-2-37607-197-6. OCLC 932068698. S2CID 193527129.
- Lacroix-Riz, Annie (2019). La non-épuration en France: De 1943 aux années 1950 (in French). Dunod. ISBN 978-2-10-085683-1. OCLC 1120075305.
- Lacroix-Riz, Annie (2016). Les élites françaises entre 1940 et 1944: de la collaboration avec l'Allemagne à l'alliance américaine. Armand Colin. OCLC 953981793.
- Lacroix-Riz, Annie (2023). Les Origines du plan Marshall: Le mythe de "l'aide" américaine (in French). Armand Colin. ISBN 978-2-200-63822-1. OCLC 1402163962.

=== Selected articles ===
- "Unitaires et Confédérés d'une réunification à l'autre (1934-1943)", Cahiers d'Histoire de l'Institut de recherches marxistes, N15, 1983, 31–58.
- Lacroix-Riz, Annie (1986). "Les Grandes Banques françaises de la Collaboration à l'épuration: La non épuration bancaire 1944–1950". Revue d'histoire de la Deuxième Guerre Mondiale et des Conflits Contemporains (in French). 36 (142): 81–101. JSTOR 25729342.
- Lacroix-Riz, Annie (1994). "Le rôle du Vatican dans la colonisation de l'Afrique (1920-1938): de la romanisation des missions à la conquête de l'Ethiopie". Revue d'Histoire Moderne & Contemporaine. 41 (1): 29–81. doi:10.3406/rhmc.1994.1703.
- Lacroix-Riz, Annie (1997). "Les élites françaises et la collaboration économique: la banque, l'industrie, Vichy et le Reich". Revue d'Histoire de la Shoah (in French). 1 (159): 8–123. doi:10.3917/rhsho1.159.0009.
- Lacroix-Riz, Annie (2002). "L'histoire commissionnée – un nouveau paradigme ?". Mouvements (in French). 3 (21–22): 135–142. doi:10.3917/mouv.021.0135.
- Lacroix-Riz, Annie (May 2003). "Quand les Américains voulaient gouverner la France" (in French). Le Monde Diplomatique.
- "Les comités d'organisation et l' Allemagne: tentative d'évaluation" (2003/4)
- Lacroix-Riz, Annie (May 2005). "L'Union soviétique par pertes et profits" (in French). Le Monde Diplomatique.
- Lacroix-Riz, Annie (2007). "Penser et construire l'Europe. Remarques sur la bibliographie de la question d'histoire contemporaine 2007–2009". La Pensée (in French) (352): 145–159.

=== Online conferences ===
- Quatre conférences novembre 2010, dans le cadre d'une "Université pour tous" à la médiathèque Louis Aragon de Bagneux (92) : "Les débuts de l'intégration européenne, des années 1920 à l'après deuxième guerre mondiale".
- Présentation de l'historienne et de son travail, 2011, Les Films de l'An 2.
- Intervention sur Radio m Drôme
- Conférence mp3 article de montpellier-journal.fr, 2010.
- Emission Comaguer, radio galère, 2011. Voir aussi Les archives des Emissions de radio Comaguer.
- Conférence à propos de son livre Le Choix de la défaite, invitée par le parti Solidarité et progrès, 2006.
- Conférence mp3 en ligne tenue le 4 octobre 2008 à la maison de l’éducation populaire de Lille. Document enregistré et diffusé par le média du tiers secteur audiovisuel Passerellesud.org
- "Les concepts historiques tabous de l’historiographie dominante", Vidéo du Chspm, 2009.
- Intervention sur Polémix et la Voix Off sur la «Synarchie».

== See also ==
- Strange Defeat
