= Young Republic League =

French political party

The Young Republic League (French: Ligue de la jeune république, LJR) was a French political party created in 1912 by Marc Sangnier. It was a continuation of Le Sillon, Sangnier's Christian social movement which Pope Pius X (1835–1914) had intervened to close in 1910. The LJR supported personalist socialism on the model of Emmanuel Mounier's theory of personalism.

The Abbé Pierre was a member of the party for a short time after leaving the MRP. Members of the LJR later joined the Union of the Socialist Left, the first movement that included both Marxists and Social Christians.

== See also ==
- Marc Sangnier
- Emmanuel Mounier's "Personalism"
