= Pacte Synarchique =

Historical theory about Vichy France

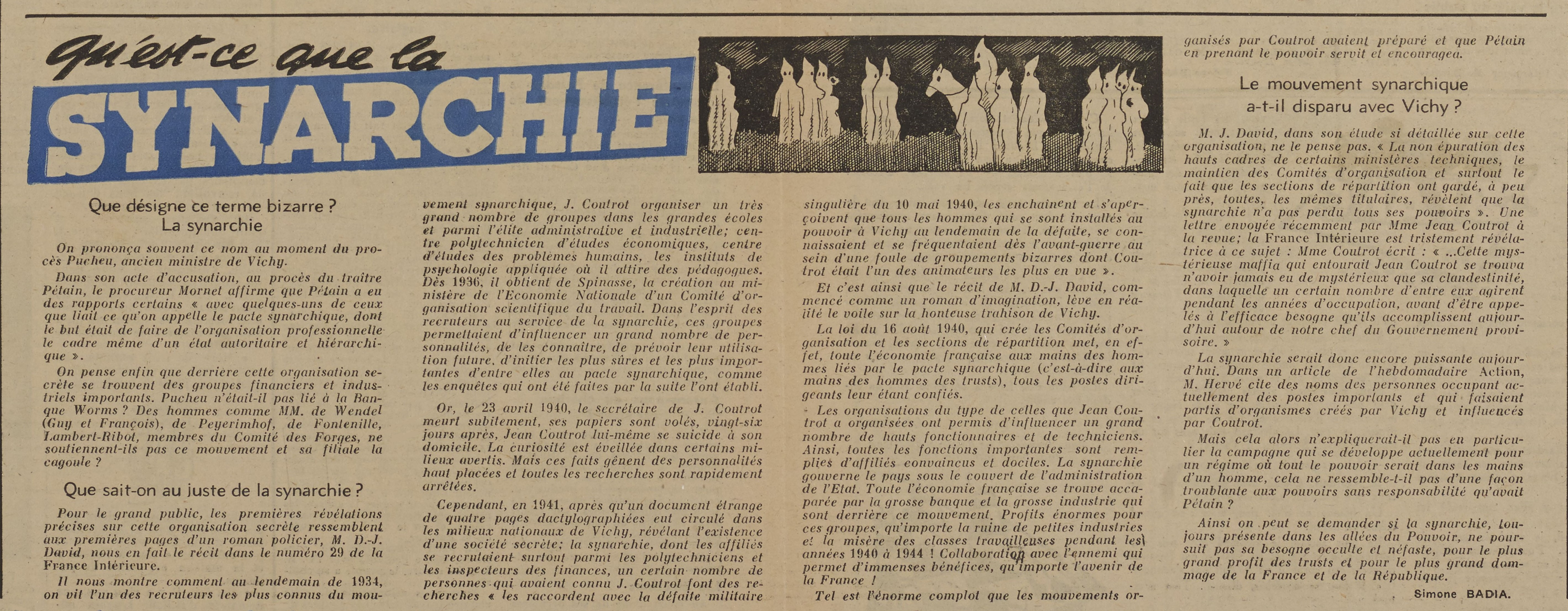
Femmes Francaises

The Pacte Synarchique is a historical theory that the surrender of Vichy France was as a result of a conspiracy by French industrial and banking interests to surrender France to Hitler in order to fight Communism.

== The theory ==
This theory allegedly originated with the discovery of a document called Pacte Synarchique following the death (May 19, 1941) of Jean Coutrot, former member of Groupe X-Crise, on May 15, 1941. According to this document, a Mouvement Synarchique d'Empire had been founded in 1922 with the aim of abolishing parliamentarianism and replacing it with synarchy. This led to the belief that La Cagoule, a far-right organisation, was the armed branch of French synarchism, and that some important members of the Vichy Regime were synarchists. The Vichy government ordered an investigation, leading to the Rapport Chavin but no evidence for the existence of the Mouvement Synarchiste d'Empire was found. Most of the presumed synarchists were either associated with the Banque Worms or with Groupe X-Crise; they were close to Admiral François Darlan (Vichy prime minister 1941–1942), and this has led to the belief that synarchists had engineered the military defeat of France for the profit of Banque Worms.

== Debates about its existence ==
Former OSS officer William Langer claimed that some French industrial and banking interests, even before the war, looked on Nazi Germany as the savior of Europe from Communism and to install a "synarchy" of industrialists and bankers to govern Europe, although he didn't refer to any specific Pacte.

This belief system has been dismissed as a "work of a paranoid imagination which wove together the histories of three disparate groups of activists, creating a conspiracy among them where none existed". Most historians affirm that the Pacte Synarchique was a hoax created by some French collaborators with Nazi Germany to weaken Darlan and his Vichy technocrats. Only the Marxist historian Annie Lacroix-Riz defends the idea that the synarchy existed.
