= Henri Daniel-Rops =

French Roman Catholic writer and historian

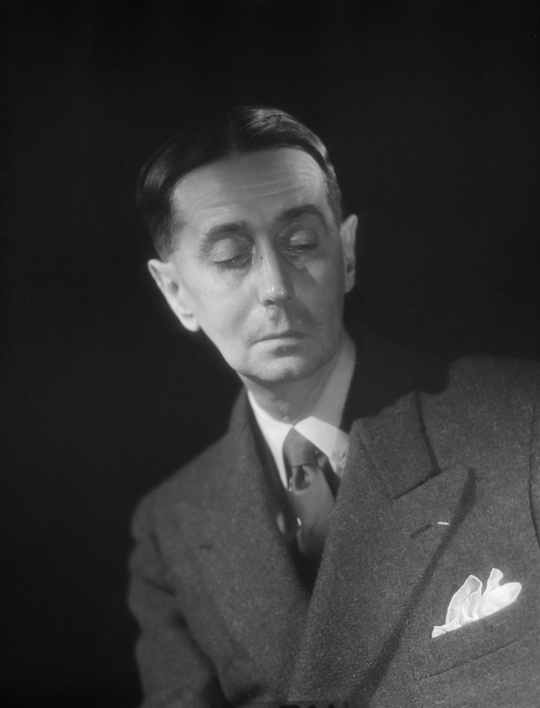
- Photograph of Daniel-Rops by Studio Harcourt (1950)
- Born: Henri Jules Charles Petiot; 19 January 1901; Épinal, France
- Died: 27 July 1965 (aged 64); Tresserve, France
- Spouse: Madeleine Bouvier
- Children: Francis Petiot
- Writing career
- Pen name: Daniel-Rops, Henri Daniel-Rops
- Notable works: Nôtre Inquiétude (Our Anxiety, an essay from 1926); L'âme obscure (The Dark Soul, 1929); Jesus and His Times (1945); Daily Life in Palestine at the Time of Christ (1961)

Henri Jules Charles Petiot (19 January 1901 – 27 July 1965), known by the pen name Henri Daniel-Rops, was a French Catholic writer and historian. At the time of his death, he was considered to be, internationally, "one of Roman Catholicism's outstanding writers."

== Biography ==
Daniel-Rops was the son of a military officer. He was a student at the Faculties of Law and Literature in Grenoble, receiving his Agrégation in History in 1922 at the age of 21, the youngest in France. He was a professor of history in Chambéry, then in Amiens and finally in Paris. In the late 1920s he began his literary career with an essay, Notre inquiétude (Our Anxiety, 1926), a novel, L'âme obscure (The Dark Soul, 1929), and several articles in journals such as Correspondent, Notre Temps and La Revue des vivants.

Daniel-Rops, who had been brought up a Roman Catholic, had by the 1920s become an agnostic. In Notre inquiétude his theme was humanity's loss of meaning and direction in an increasingly industrialized and mechanized world. When he considered the misery and social injustice around him, and the apparent indifference of Christians to those they called their brothers, he questioned whether Christianity was any longer a living force in the world.

The alternatives, however, did not seem any better. Marxism, for instance, claimed to concern itself with people's material well-being, but quite ignored their non-material needs, which for Daniel-Rops was unacceptable. In the 1930s he returned to the Catholic Church, having come to feel that, in spite of the shortcomings of Christians, it was only through Christianity that the technological age could be reconciled with humanity's inner needs.

== Literary career ==
Starting in 1931 he wrote mostly about Catholicism, advised by Gabriel Marcel with whom he shared membership of the Ordre Nouveau. He helped disseminate its ideas in books in which it is often difficult to distinguish his personal reflections from the doctrines of the movement he had attached himself to, and which make him a leading representative of the intellectual ferment among non-conformists in the 1930s: Le Monde sans âme (The World without a Soul), Les annés tournantes, Eléments de notre destin.

After 1935, his ties with Ordre Nouveau loosened somewhat. He collaborated with the Catholic weeklies Sept and Temps présent. By 1940 he had published several novels, biographies and essays. For Plon he directed the collection Présences, in which he published the book La France et son armée (France and Its Army) by General de Gaulle, who became his friend.

From 1941 to 1944, he wrote Le peuple de la Bible (Sacred History), the first of a series of works of religious history that would culminate in the monumental Histoire de l'Eglise du Christ (History of the Church of Christ) (1948–1965). Since it appeared during the German occupation of France, Sacred History was quickly confiscated. The book later became a great success; the English version appeared in 1949. The English version of Jésus et son temps (Jesus and His Times) was released in 1954.

After the liberation of France in 1944, he abandoned teaching to devote himself to his work as a Christian historian and writer, directing the magazine Ecclésia and editing Je sais, je crois (I know, I believe), published in dozens of volumes in English as The Twentieth Century Encyclopedia of Catholicism. His 1952 book Missa Est included a combination of photographs regarding the mass and commentaries on individual parts of the ceremony.

From 1957 to 1963 he was one of the fifty governors of the European Foundation of Culture founded by Denis de Rougemont. In 1955, he was elected to the Académie française.

== Criticism ==
Dominican priest Gervase Mathew noted in a 1959 review that Henri-Rops's style had its flaws: factual inaccuracies, odd omissions, and imaginative "flights of pure fancy" were common in the French writer's publications. Nonetheless, the author's undeniable literary skill, brilliant French rhetoric, and "unflagging verve" make his work a valuable contribution.

== Bibliography ==
- 1926: Notre inquiétude
- 1926: Sur le théâtre de H. R. Lenormand
- 1927: Le Vent dans la nuit
- 1928: Le Prince menteur
- 1928: Carte d’Europe
- 1929: L'Âme obscure
- 1930: Deux hommes en moi. Paris, Plon, 254 p. Completed in August 1928, according to the first edition.
- 1931: Fauteuil 24: Édouard Estaunié
- 1932: Les Années tournantes
- 1932: Le Monde sans âme
- 1933: Péguy
- 1933: Severa
- 1934: Mort, où est ta victoire ?
- 1934: Éléments de notre destin
- 1935: Le Cœur complice
- 1935: La Misère et nous
- 1936: La Pureté trahie
- 1936: Rimbaud, le drame spirituel
- 1937: Le Communisme et les Chrétiens (in collaboration)
- 1937: Ce qui meurt et ce qui naît
- 1937: Tournant de la France
- 1938: Présence et poésie
- 1938: Le Courtinaire
- 1938: La Maladie des sentiments
- 1938: La Main d’un juste
- 1938: La France veut la liberté (in collaboration)
- 1939: L’Épée de feu
- 1939: Le Mystère animal : l’animal cet inconnu (in collaboration)
- 1939: Une campagne de “Temps présent” : la paix par le Christ (in collaboration)
- 1941: L’Avenir de la science (in collaboration)
- 1941: La Femme et sa mission (in collaboration)
- 1941: Mystiques de France
- 1941: L’Ombre de la douleur
- 1941: La signification héroïque de Péguy et de Psichari
- 1941: Vouloir
- 1942: Où passent les anges
- 1942: Psichari
- 1943: L’Œuvre grandissante de Patrice de La Tour du Pin
- 1943: Par-delà notre nuit
- 1943: Histoire sainte. I : Le Peuple de la Bible
- 1943: Comment connaissons-nous Jésus ?
- 1944: Trois images de la grandeur
- 1944: Péguy et la vraie France (in collaboration)
- 1945: Histoire sainte. II : Jésus en son temps
- 1946: Quêtes de Dieu. Trois tombes, trois visages
- 1946: Notre histoire. I : Des origines à 1610
- 1946: Histoire sainte de mes filleuls
- 1946: Un héraut de l’Esprit : saint Paul
- 1946: Boquen, témoignage d’espérance
- 1946: Deux études sur William Blake
- 1947: Notre histoire. II : De 1610 à nos jours
- 1947: Aux silences du cœur
- 1947: Ce visage qui nous regarde
- 1947: L’Évangile de mes filleuls. Lourdes
- 1947: Marges de la prière
- 1947: La Nuit du cœur flambant
- 1947: Sept portraits de femmes
- 1947: Terre fidèle
- 1948: Diane blessée
- 1948: Histoire de l’Église du Christ. I : L’Église des apôtres et des martyrs
- 1948: Pascal et notre cœur
- 1948: Le Sang des martyrs
- 1948: Les Évangiles de la Vierge
- 1949: De l’amour humain dans la Bible
- 1949: La Vie du Christ dans la culture française
- 1949: Rencontre avec Charles Du Bos
- 1949: Histoire sainte illustrée
- 1949: Chants pour les abîmes
- 1949: Orphiques
- 1950: Histoire de l’Église du Christ. II : L’Église des temps barbares
- 1950: Le Christ, thème éternel
- 1950: L’Histoire sainte des petits enfants
- 1950: Légende dorée de mes filleuls
- 1950: Toi aussi, Nathanaël
- 1950: Préface du Journal d'Anne FRANK
- 1951: Le Roi ivre de Dieu
- 1951: Noé et son grand bateau
- 1951: ABC du petit chrétien
- 1951: Les Aventuriers de Dieu. Bartolomé de Las Casas
- 1951: Histoire de Jonas. Missa est
- 1952: Le Drame des Templiers
- 1952: Le Pèlerin à la coquille
- 1952: Rome
- 1952: La Thérapeutique dans l’Ancien Testament
- 1952: Saint Paul, conquérant du Christ
- 1952: Histoire de l’Église du Christ. III : L’Église de la cathédrale et de la croisade
- 1953: Chemin de Croix. Claire dans la clarté
- 1953: Diptyque pour le temps de Pâques
- 1953: Jésus disait à ses amis
- 1953: Les Miracles du Fils de Dieu
- 1953: Le Porche de Dieu fait homme
- 1953: Quand un saint arbitrait l’Europe : saint Bernard
- 1954: Être des saint
- 1954: La Vie du Christ dans les chefs-d’œuvre de la peinture
- 1954: Histoire sainte
- 1954: L’Évangile de la pierre
- 1954: La Passion
- 1955: Saint Paul, aventurier de Dieu
- 1955: Qu’est-ce que la Bible ?
- 1955: Histoire de l’Église du Christ. IV : L’Église de la Renaissance et de la Réforme
- 1955: Aux lions, les chrétiens !
- 1955: Comment on bâtissait les cathédrales
- 1956: Apôtres et martyrs
- 1957: Claudel tel que je l’ai connu
- 1958: Histoire de l’Église du Christ. V : L’Église des temps classiques
- 1959: Monsieur Vincent
- 1960: Histoire de l’Église du Christ. VI : L’Église des révolutions. 1 : En face de nouveaux destins (1789-1870)
- 1961: La Vie quotidienne en Palestine au temps de Jésus
- 1962: Saint Bernard et ses fils
- 1962: Vatican II, le concile de S. S. Jean XXIII
- 1963: Histoire de l’Église du Christ. VII : L’Église des révolutions. 2 : Un combat pour Dieu (1870-1939)
- 1964: Chant pour un roi lépreux
- 1965: Histoire de l’Église du Christ. VIII : L’Église des révolutions. 3 : Ces chrétiens nos frères
