= X-Crise =

French think-tank of the 1930s

- Formation: 1931
- Founder: Gérard Bardet; Jean Coutrot; André Loizillon; John Nicolétis
- Dissolved: 1940
- Type: Lobby group

The Groupe X-Crise (or X-Crise) was a French technocratic movement created in 1931 as a consequence of the 1929 Wall Street stock market crash and the Great Depression. Formed by former students of the École Polytechnique (nicknamed "X"), it advocated planisme, or economic planning, as opposed to the then dominant ideology of classical liberalism which they held to have failed. Their ideas would not be put into practice until the Vichy era, when many technocrats seized the opportunity to reconstruct France, and the disputed document Pacte Synarchique apparently named this group as the plotters to install the Vichy regime. However, many members of the group joined the Resistance and opposed the Vichy regime, ultimately participating in the post-war administration.

== Members ==
X-Crise was founded by Gérard Bardet and André Loizillon, and its members included Raymond Abellio, Louis Vallon, Jean Coutrot, Jules Moch and Alfred Sauvy, who as head of the INED demographic institute after World War II coined the term "Third World".

== See also ==
- Non-conformists of the 1930s

== Bibliography ==
- Richard F. Kuisel (Spring 1970). "The Legend of the Vichy Synarchy." French Historical Studies, vol. 6, no. 3. pp. 365–398. doi:10.2307/286065.
- (in French) X-Crise (Centre polytechnicien d'études économiques), De la récurrence des crises économiques. Son cinquantenaire (1931–1981). Economica (1982).
