= Robert Francis (writer) =

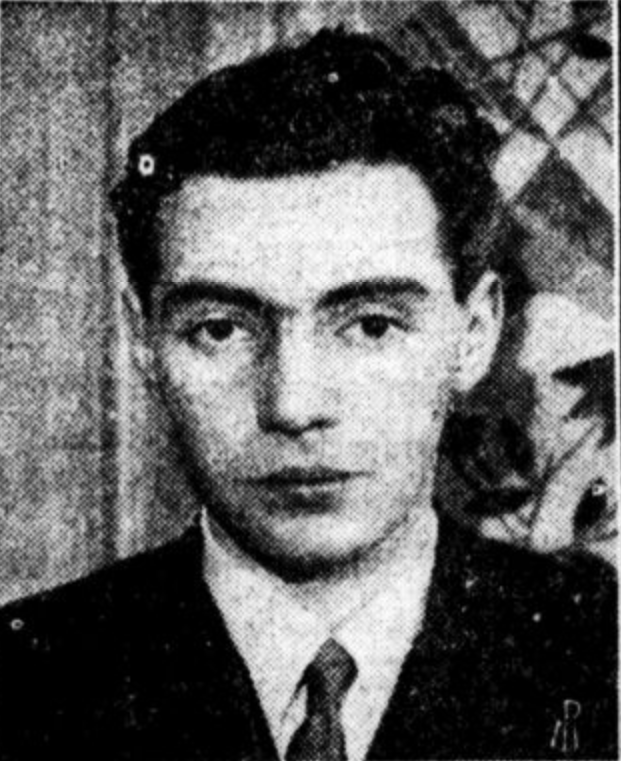

Robert Francis (born Jean Godmé; 24 October 1909 – 29 June 1946) was a French writer, winner of the 1934 edition of the Prix Femina.

== Biography ==
Born in Paris, Robert Francis was the brother of Jean-Pierre Maxence. After studying science, he occupied a post of civil engineer in the north of France in the 1930s. At the same time, he devoted himself to literature and founded the literary magazine Les Cahiers with his brother in 1928; the magazine ran until 1931.

Robert Francis belonged to the middle of the Jeune Droite catholique des années 1930 ("Young Catholic Right of the 1930s"). He was a friend of Thierry Maulnier; together with him and his brother Jean-Pierre Maxence, he wrote Demain la France ("Tomorrow France"), a charge against the Popular Front government, written on the morrow of the 6 February 1934 crisis.

Francis is buried at the Cimetière parisien de Bagneux.

== Work ==
Histoire d'une famille sous la Troisième République (suite romanesque)

- 1933: (I) - La Grange aux trois belles, Paris, Librairie de la Revue française, Alexis Redier éd.
- 1934: (II) - La Chute de la maison de verre - La maison de verre, Librairie de la Revue française, Alexis Redier éd.
- 1934: (III) - La Chute de la maison de verre - Le Bateau-refuge, Paris, éditions Gallimard - Prix Fémina 1934
- 1935: (IV) - Les Mariés de Paris, Gallimard
- 1937: (V) - Le Gardien d’épaves, Gallimard

Other publications

- 1934: Demain la France, Paris, éditions Grasset, 1934, cowritten with Jean-Pierre Maxence and Thierry Maulnier
- 1936: Une vie d'enfant, Gallimard, (his first essay fiction, previously published in review)
- 1937: Un an de vacances, Gallimard
- 1938: La Jeune Fille secrète, Gallimard
- 1939: L'Oie, Gallimard
- 1941: Souvenirs imaginaires, Gallimard
- 1941: Histoire sainte (tales), Gallimard
