= Notre charge apostolique =

Apostolic letter from Pius X to French bishops

Notre charge apostolique French for 'Our Apostolic Mandate' Encyclical of Pope Pius X
- Signature date: 15 August 1910
- Subject: Sillon movement
- Number: 14 of 17 of the pontificate
- Text: In English

Notre charge apostolique (our Apostolic Mandate) was a papal letter promulgated by Pope Pius X on August 15, 1910.

== Context ==
The Pope took issue with the socialist leanings of the Catholic 'Le Sillon' movement of Marc Sangnier. He said that Sillonists wanted to completely level social differences and to create a "universal Church" by joining "unbelievers". The Pope emphasized that a Catholic view of social justice meant considering the needs of both the powerful and poor. The Sillonists, he said, did not accept that authority comes from God down to the authorized leaders and from there to the people.
