= Marc Sangnier =

French politician

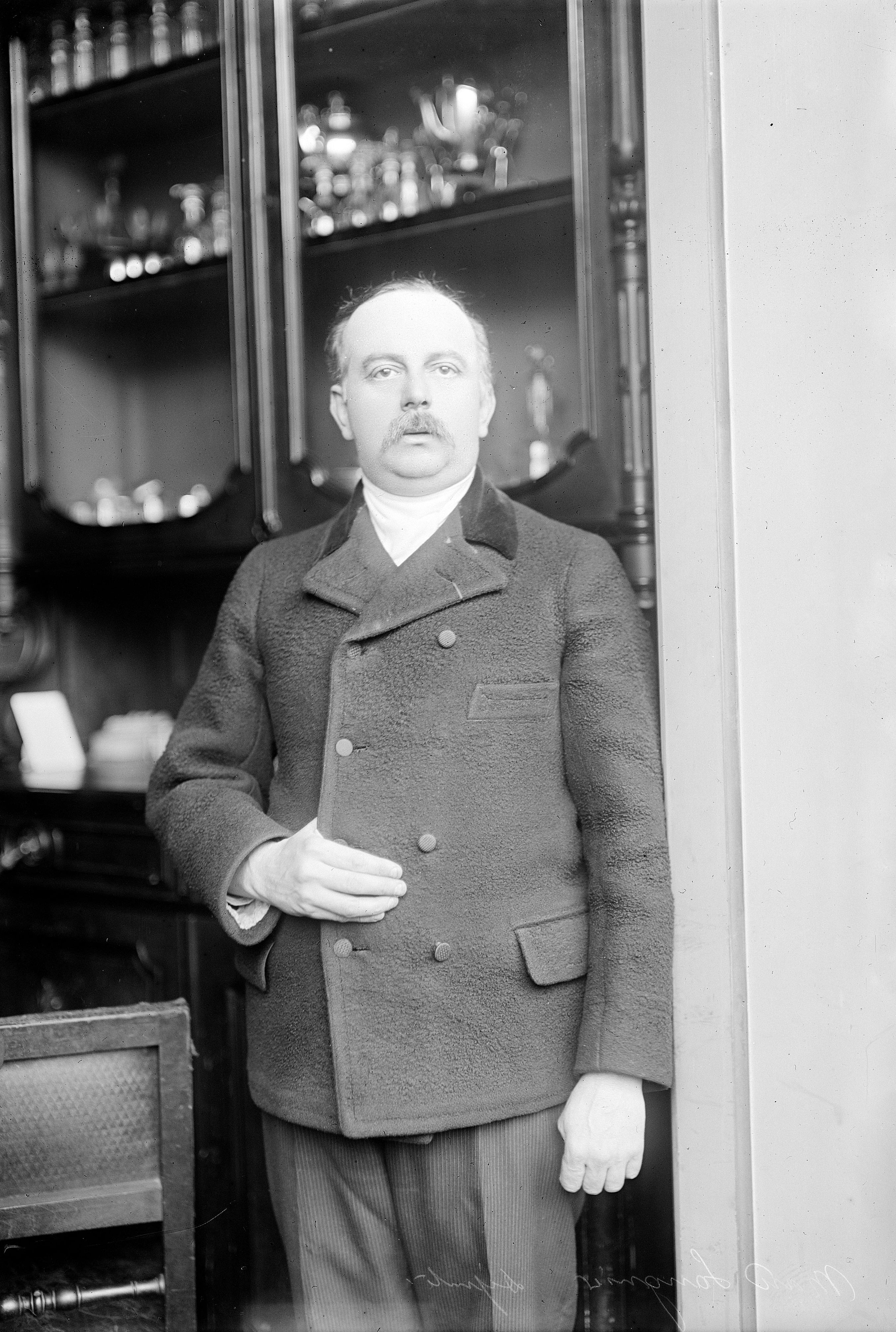
Marc Sangnier in 1919

Marc Sangnier (French pronunciation: [maʁk sɑ̃ɲe]; 3 April 1873, Paris – 28 May 1950, Paris) was a French Roman Catholic thinker and politician, who in 1894 founded Le Sillon ("The Furrow"), a social Catholic movement.

== Work ==
Sangnier aimed to bring the Catholic Church into a greater conformity with French Republican ideals and to provide an alternative to anticlerical labour movements. The movement was initially successful, but was eventually condemned by Pope Pius X in the encyclical Notre charge apostolique in 1910. A plaque however in the garden of the Marc Sangnier Institute in Boulevard Raspail recalls the visit some years later of Cardinal Bonaventura Cerretti, the emissary of Pope Benedict XV. In 1912 Sangnier founded a replacement group, the Young Republic League to promote his vision of social Catholicism.

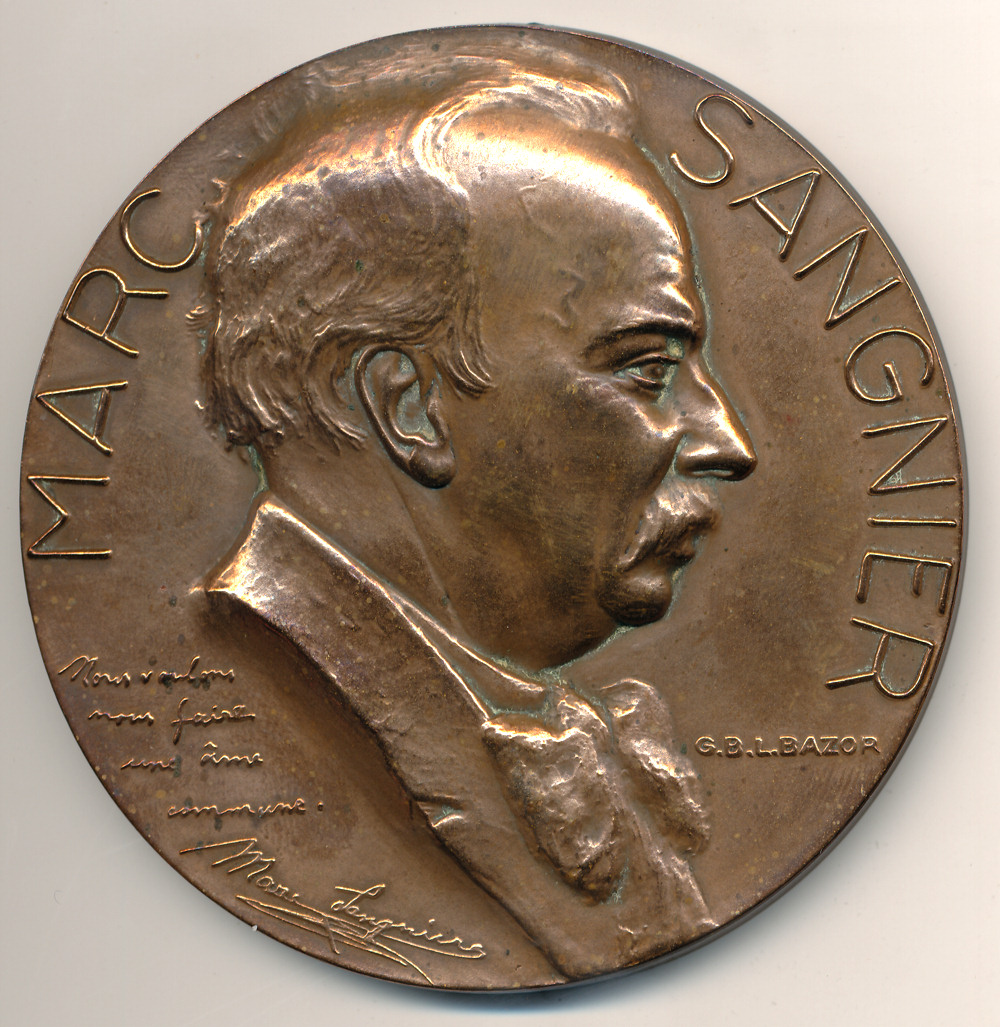
A medallion commemorating Sangnier

Sangnier founded a newspaper, La Démocratie, which campaigned for equality for women, proportional representation at elections, and for pacifism. He was also one of the pioneers of the French youth-hostelling movement. In 1928 he employed the 19-year-old Émilien Amaury in his first job, from which he went on to found the Amaury publishing empire.
