= Jean-Pierre Maxence =

French writer (1906–1956)

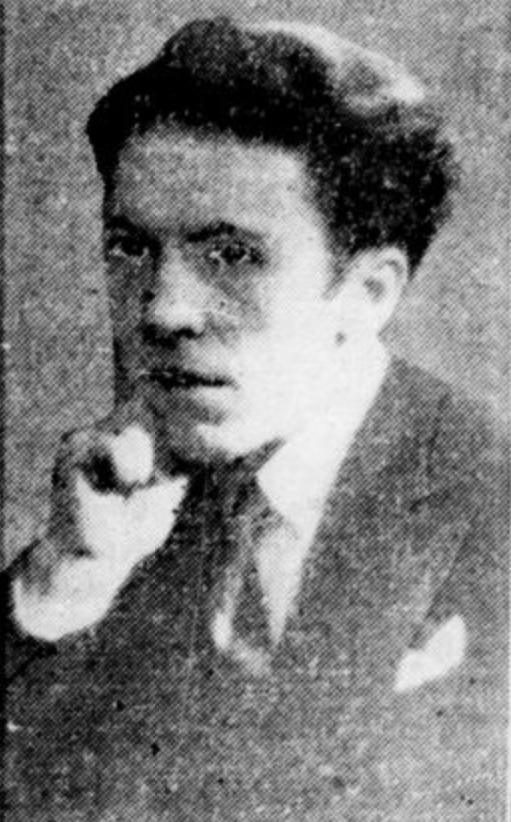
Jean-Pierre Maxence in 1933

Jean-Pierre Maxence (20 August 1906 – 16 May 1956) was a French writer who was one of the so-called Non-conformists of the 1930s. Maxence was a leading figure within the so-called Jeune Droite tendency and was associated with other Catholic writers such as Jean de Fabrègues and René Vincent.

== Biography ==
Born in Paris as Pierre Godmé, he adopted his name after a character in Ernest Psichari's book Le Voyage du centurion. He was close to the Action française without ever actually joining the group and also wrote for the neo-Thomist La Gazette Francaise. In his early years he was a staunch monarchist. He did not come to prominence until the 1930s when he wrote on myriad topics for the various reviews produced by the non-conformists. He was at this time a member of Solidarité Française, albeit a fairly inactive one. He was critical of the far right group of writers based around the newspaper Je suis partout and had a personal hatred of Germany, although he was equally disdainful of Léon Blum. A devout Roman Catholic, his own writings revealed an empathy towards a fascism rooted firmly in Catholicism, effectively a French version of Rexism. He felt that democracy in France was having a stagnating effect in contrast to what he perceived as the dynaims of Europe's dictatorships and accused the French government of seeking "to transform France into an insurance company" instead of embracing the adventurist spirit of fascism. From 1933 up to the war his main polemical outlet was his regular column, ostensibly about literary criticism, in the journal Gringoire.

Maxence was taken to Oflag II-D in 1940 before being allowed to return to France the following year. Once back home Maxence became reconciled to Vichy France and took up his pen in support of the rule of Philippe Pétain. However alongside this he also undertook work for Jewish charities during the Second World War, once again demonstrating his duplicitous relationship to mainstream far right opinion in France. Due to his public support for Vichy he went into exile in Switzerland after the war. There he became director of Centre Supérieure de Philosophie in Geneva. He remained in Geneva until his death.

His younger brother was the writer Robert Francis, winner of the Prix Femina in 1934 with a novel entitled Le Bateau-refuge.
