= Domènec Ruiz Devesa =

Spanish politician

Domènec Ruiz Devesa MEP
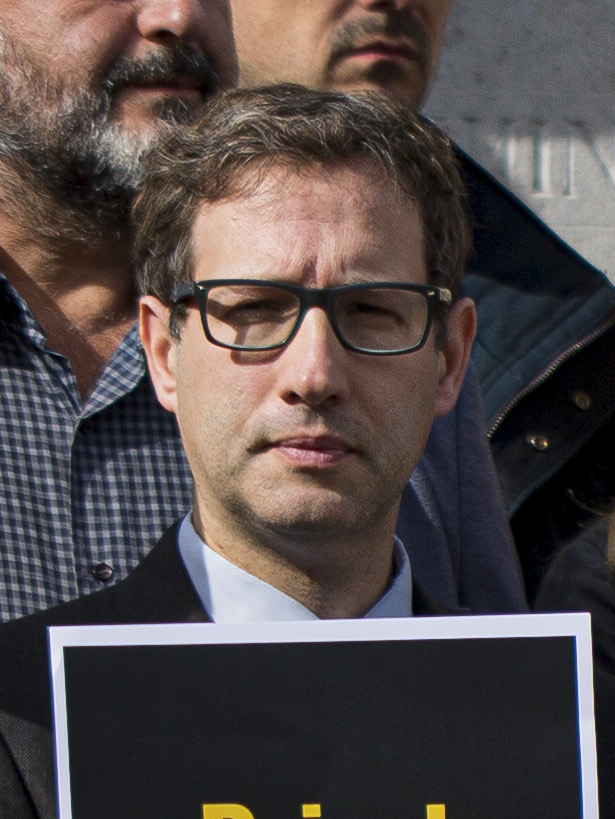

Member of the European Parliament for Spain
- In office 2 July 2019 – 15 July 2024

Personal details
- Born: 3 March 1978 (age 48) Alicante, Spain
- Party: Spanish Socialist Workers' Party

Domènec Ruiz Devesa (born 1978) is a Spanish politician of the Spanish Socialist Workers' Party (PSOE) who served as a Member of the European Parliament from 2019 until 2024.

== Political career ==
Ruiz Devesa started his political career as an economic policy advisor to Jonás Fernández Álvarez, a member of the European Parliament since 2014. Together they co-edited a book on Charlemagne and the European Union.

In 2019, Ruiz Devesa was elected as an MEP, and worked in the Committee on Culture and Education and the Committee on Constitutional Affairs. In 2021 he was appointed as a member of the Parliament's delegation to the Conference on the Future of Europe. In 2022, he was the parliament's rapporteur on a proposal for an overhaul of European election rules that would give all EU citizens aged 18 and older a greater role in choosing the Commission president, allow them to vote for pan-European MEPs and choose postal voting.

In addition to his committee assignments, Ruiz Devesa was a member of the European Parliament Intergroup on Climate Change, Biodiversity and Sustainable Development, the European Parliament Intergroup on LGBT Rights, the European Parliament Intergroup on Trade Unions and the Spinelli Group. Ruiz Devesa suggested that the European Central Bank could consider helicopter money.

In 2024 he was not included in the Electoral Lists and ceased to be an MEP at the start of the New European Parliament.

He is the presumptive nominee of his political party (PSOE) for being major in his birth city, (Alicante) in the 2028 poll.
