= Italian Council of the European Movement =

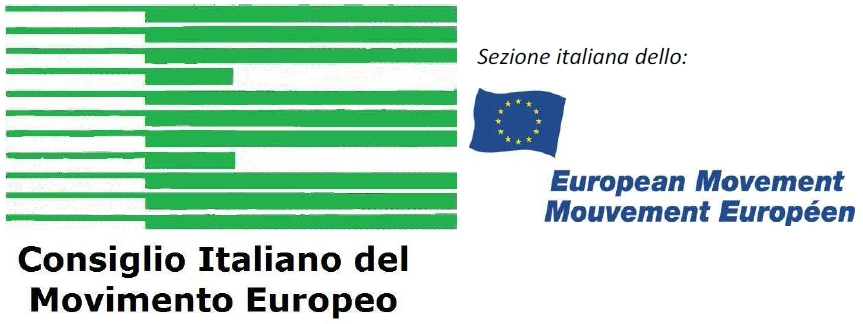
- Formation: 1948
- Type: Lobbying association
- Location: Italy
- President: Pier Vigilio Dastoli
- Key people: Stefano Milia (Secretary General)
- Website: movimentoeuropeo.it/

Italian Council of the European Movement is an Italian advocacy group.

== History ==
Following May 1948 Congress of the Hague, was created in Italy, in December 1948, a National Council of the European Movement which was an organism in charge of the cooperation between the pro-European MPs and the European Federalist Movement. However its rebuilding was necessary in 1956 because of the opposition inside the pro-European movement between the so-called “functionalists”, supporters of a progressive market integration of the “little Europe” – in which they recognized the necessary base for every further development – and the majority of the Italian federalists, like Altiero Spinelli, very critical about the European governments after the failure of the European Community of Defence. In these conditions, it seemed unavoidable that the CIME assumes de facto an alternative character respecting to the militant federalism because of its composition (including political parties in charge and unions related to these). This situation evolved with time, notably thank to the accession of Giuseppe Petrilli at the Presidency in autumn 1964. In spite of being a former member of the EEC-three-first-year Commission, he matured a vision of the integration process which surpass the intergovernmental approach. The merger between the CIME and the Federalist Movement came to a conclusion in 1966 with the adhesion of the second to the first. The European Movement joined – first at the national level then to the European one – the fundamental positions of the federalist strategy and so recognized the importance of European Parliament election at the universal direct suffrage as an indispensable condition for any further progress on the political and institutional camp. When the parliamentary initiative of Altiero Spinelli (after the 1979 first EP elections) demonstrated the adequacy of this strategy, the CIME gave it its full support, through the strong pressure in favour of the treaty project made by the European Parliament to the Italian presidency of the Community, in the first semester of 1985. From there, the successive presidencies of Mauro Ferri, Mario Zagari e Giorgio Napolitano largely confirmed the continuity of the rapport within the CIME between the national political, social-economic forces and the federalist avant-garde. So the CIME counted among the protagonists in Italy of the constant commitment in favour of the Euro creation but also of European institutional reforms to get to the adoption of a real Constitution for the Union.

== See also ==
- European Movement International
- European Movement Belgium
- European Movement Germany
- European Movement Ireland
- European Movement Switzerland
- European Movement UK
