= Esprit (magazine) =

French political & philosophical serial

Logo of Esprit

Esprit is a French literary magazine. The magazine also deals with current events. It is based in Paris.

== History and profile ==
Founded in October 1932 by Emmanuel Mounier, it was the principal review of personalist intellectuals of the time. From 1957 to 1976, it was directed by Jean-Marie Domenach. Paul Thibaud directed it from 1977 to 1989. Since 1989 Oliver Mongin has been the director of the magazine. The philosopher Paul Ricœur often collaborated with it. Esprit is a member of the Eurozine network.

== Personalism and the non-conformists ==
In the 1930s, Esprit was the main mouthpiece of the Personalists and of the non-conformists of the 1930s. A presentation of the magazine by its authors in 1933 stated that it opposed the "compromission" (compromising) of spiritual values with the established order (which Mounier called "established disorder") and aimed at denouncing their "exploitation by the powers of Money, in the social regime, in the government, in the press, etc." Esprit opposed partial reforms and aimed at a global rebuilding of the basis of the social edifice. It targeted as opponents "individualist materialism", claiming that the "capitalist jungle was its ultimate product"; "collectivist materialism", which linked both Communism and Capitalism, despite their oppositions, in the "same metaphysics"; and the "false Fascist spiritualism," which seemed to share the same opponents, but in reality turned towards the "tyrannic idolatry of inferior spiritualities: racist exaltation, national passion, anonymous discipline, devotion to the state or the leader" or plain "safeguard of economic interests." The magazine posited itself for the "rebirth" of a "community of personalities," in opposing of both liberal individualism and collectivism, in one word, mass society:

"Tout homme, sans exception, a le droit et le devoir de développer sa personalité." (Every man, without exception, has the right and the duty to develop his personality.)

== Post-War ==
Esprit broke with part of its legacy following the Liberation of France, and involved itself in New Left movements. The review criticized the systemic use of torture during the Algerian War, publishing for examples articles by Pierre Vidal-Naquet. It would also influence in the 1970s the "Second Left," gathered around the Unified Socialist Party (PSU).
