= Le Sillon =

Liberal-leftist Catholic movement in France

Le Sillon ("The Furrow" or "The Path") was a French political and religious movement founded by Marc Sangnier (1873–1950), which existed from 1894 to 1910. It aimed to bring Catholicism into a greater conformity with French Republican and socialist ideals, in order to provide an alternative to Marxism and other anticlerical labour movements.

== History ==
In 1891, Pope Leo XIII called for the Church to adopt a more open involvement in social issues in his encyclical Rerum novarum. The opportunity created by this policy led liberals within the church in France to hope for an improved relationship between the Church and the Republic. As a result, Le Sillon was founded in 1894, and began publication of their journal of the same name, edited by Sangnier.

Le Sillon called for a large-scale project to reconcile the labour movement with Christianity. Sangnier wrote "Le Sillon is designed to make France a democratic republic. This is not a Catholic movement, in that its purpose is not to make work available to the bishops and priests to help them in their own ministry. Le Sillon is a secular movement, which does not affect the fact that it is also a deeply religious movement."

In 1905 Sangnier set up a confederation of groups intended as "circles of Catholic education", where young priests could discuss religion and society. The intention was to create a less hierarchical atmosphere in the church, in which ideas emerged from ordinary priests and laity. The organization met with considerable popular enthusiasm, with up to 500,000 members in France. At this time, Le Sillon enjoyed the support of Pope Pius X and the French episcopate.

== Dissolution ==
However, Church support was short-lived. The group was perceived as becoming too modernist and Republican. After the 1905 law of separation of church and state, the movement was increasingly criticized, particularly because it emphasized the authority of ordinary Christians within the Church to the exclusion of the Pope and the hierarchy. Le Sillon was finally condemned by Pius X in the encyclical of 25 August 1910 Notre charge apostolique. As a result, the organization was dissolved.

In 1912, Sangnier founded a replacement group, the Young Republic League (Ligue de la jeune République), to promote his vision of social Catholicism.
