= Alexandre Marc =

French writer and philosopher (1904-2000)

Alexandre Marc (born Alexandr Markovitch Lipiansky, 19 January 1904 – 22 February 2000) was a French writer and philosopher. He was the founder of personalist, federalist, communitarian thinking.

He belonged to the non-conformists of the 1930s.

== Early life and education ==
Marc was born as Alexandr Markovitch Lipiansky in Odessa, Russian Empire in 1904, in a Jewish family. During the Russian Revolution he was expelled from the country, and moved to Paris where he completed his secondary education at the Lycée Saint-Louis in the mid-twenties. He studied philosophy at Jena. When he returned to France, he obtained a law degree and he graduated from Sciences Po in 1927.

== Career ==
After graduation, Marc was employed by the Hachette Publishing company, and founded a new press agency, Pax-Presse.

In 1929, Marc and Denis de Rougemont organized a meeting spot for religious and ecumenical discussion of social and political issues, le Club du Moulin Vert. In 1930, members of this organization, including Marc, founded the non conformist political organisation l'Ordre Nouveau; Marc was one of the leaders until the group dissolved in 1938. Working within this group, Marc and the group of Arnaud Dandieu developed, between 1930 and 1933, the basic ideas of the "personalist" movement and "non-conformists of the 30s." Alexandre Marc became a spokesperson of these ideas, and participated in 1932 in the founding of the journal Esprit in which he published several articles putting forward the ideas of l'Ordre Nouveau. He was later an editor for the periodical L’Ordre Nouveau.

Marc converted to Catholicism after reading St. Augustine and after Dandieu's death in October 1933. He began to write for the Dominican journal La vie intellectuelle, and in 1935, became the assistant editor of the Catholic weekly Sept, and later its successor, the weekly Temps présent, for which he wrote the press review under the pseudonym of Scrutator until the outbreak of war in 1939. He was part of the team that revived this publication, from August 1940 to August 1941 under the title Temps Nouveaux, and illegally created the Cahiers du Témoignage chrétien. During this time he co-authored Traditions socialistes françaises (Les Cahiers du Rhône, La Baconnière, octobre 1944).

In 1943, during the French occupation, Marc was in danger of arrest both for his views and his Jewish origins. Therefore, he left for Switzerland where he studied Swiss federalism with its emphasis on democracy at the village and city level. In Switzerland from 1943 to 1944, he worked at Témoignage chrétien.

Marc participated in the creation of the group "La Fédération" and became, in 1946, the Secretary General of the Union of European Federalists and in 1953, leader of the European Federalist Movement and founder of the journal L'Europe en formation. As a founder of the Centre international de formation européenne (CIFE) in 1954, he participated in the organization of the Hague Congress.

Marc was the author of many books and articles in which he expressed his conception of integral federalism. He lectured extensively until his retirement on this subject at the Centre international de formation européenne and Centre international de formation européenne et l'Institut européen des hautes études internationales (now renamed L’Institut européen-European Institute) in Nice which he founded. He also lectured on a regular basis at the Collège d'Études Fédéralistes in Aosta.

Marc died on 22 February 2000 in Vence, France.

In accordance his wishes, his personal archives were deposited at the Historical Archives of the European Union in Florence.
