= Jean Coutrot =

French engineer (1895–1941)

Jean Coutrot (French: [ʒɑ̃ kutʁo]; 27 March 1895 – 19 May 1941) was a French engineer.

He was one of the pioneers of the X-Crise group. In 1936, he founded with Center for Studies of Human Problems with Aldous Huxley and Alexis Carrel.

In June 1941, Coutrot's name was mentioned in a report submitted by Henri Chavin, director of the National Security, to the Minister of the Interior. In this document, Chavin denounces Coutrot for having founded several groups, such as the Center for Studies of Human Problems, allegedly with the aim of "recruiting [...] members of the MSE (Synarchic Empire Movement)". The "Chavin Report" thus constitutes the starting point of the denunciations aimed at the purported plot of "Synarchy".
