= Charles Spinasse =

French politician (1893–1979)

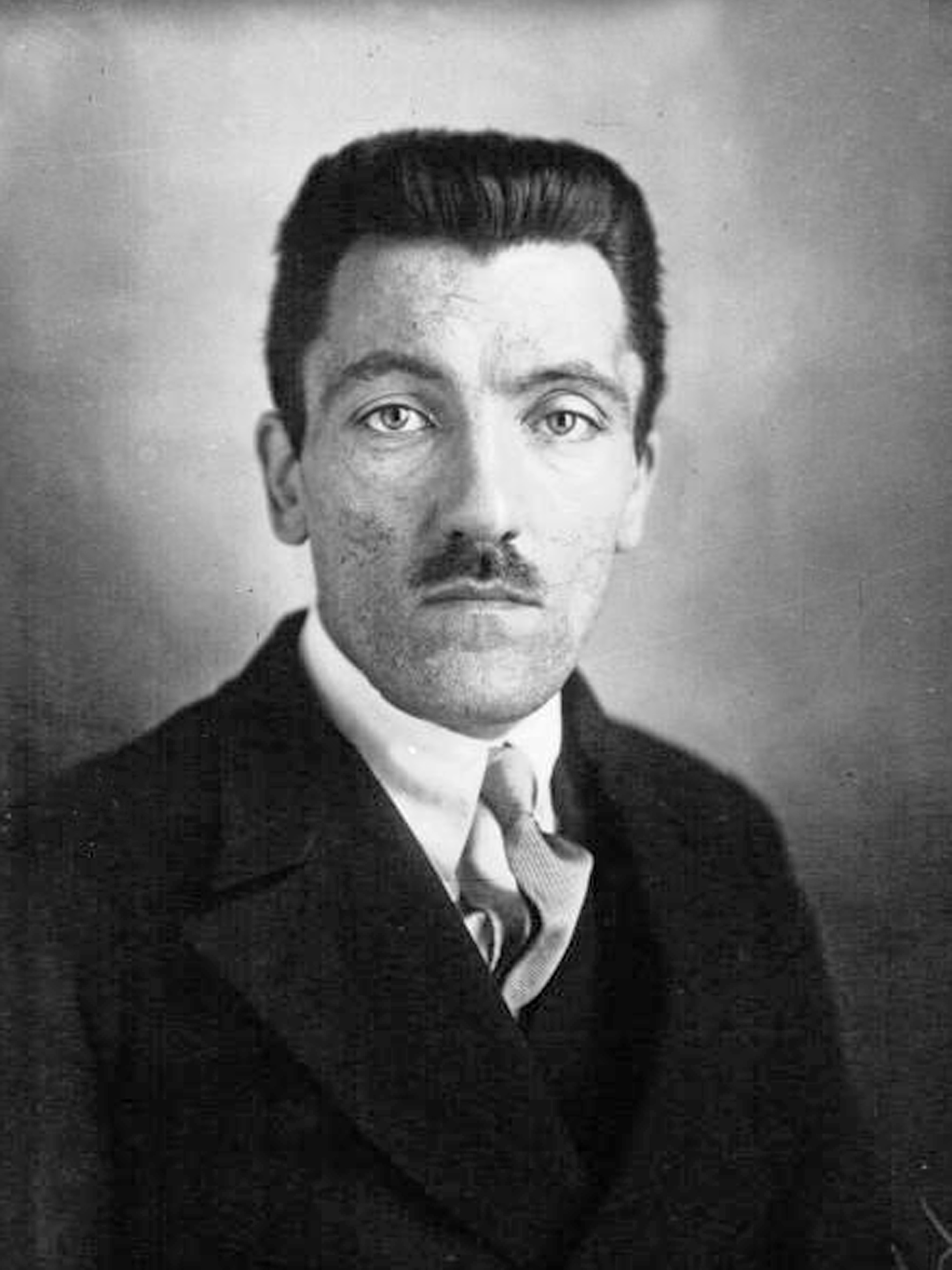
Charles Spinasse

Charles Spinasse (22 October 1893 in Égletons, Corrèze – 9 August 1979 in Rosiers-d'Égletons) was a French politician. He served as mayor of Égletons from 1929 to 1944 and again from 1965 to 1977. He belonged to the French Section of the Workers' International (SFIO). In 1938, he served as France's minister of budget.
