= Emmanuel Mounier =

French philosopher, theologian, teacher and essayist

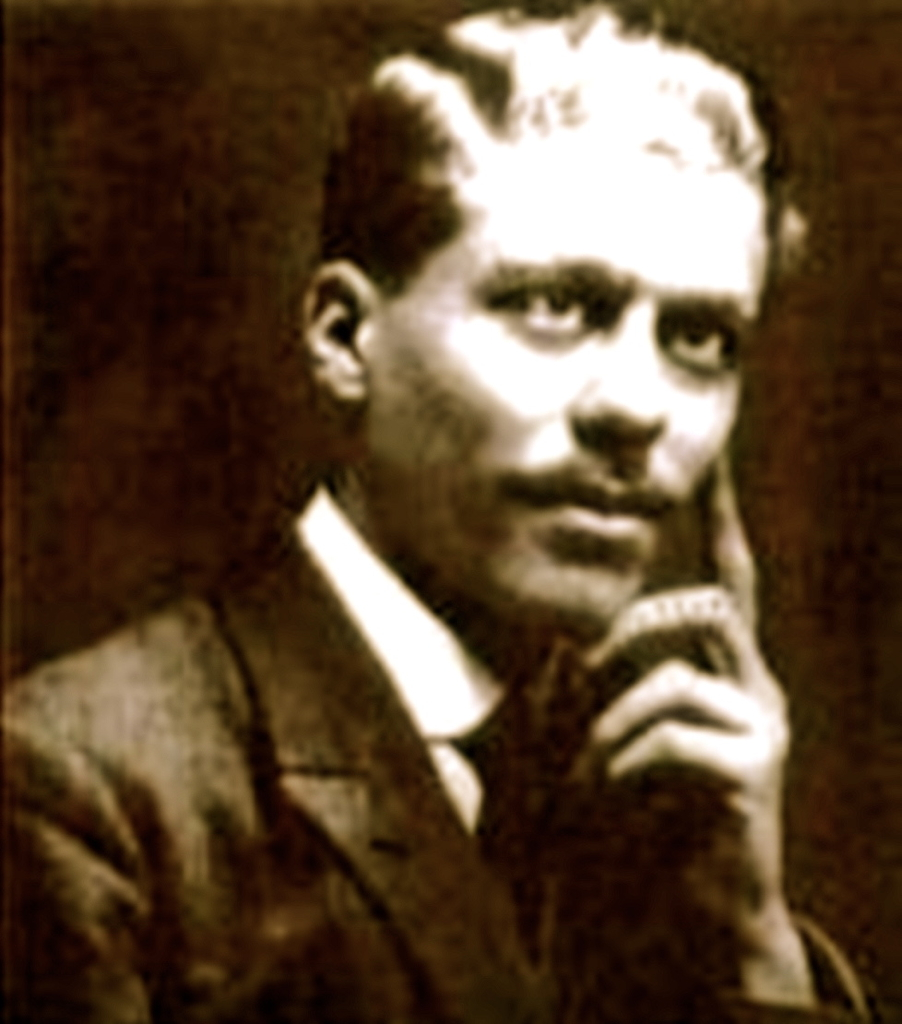
- Born: 1 April 1905; Grenoble, France
- Died: 22 March 1950 (aged 44); Châtenay-Malabry, France

Education
- Education: University of Paris
- Academic advisor: Jacques Chevalier

Philosophical work
- Era: 20th-century philosophy
- Region: Western philosophy
- School: Continental philosophy Personalism; Non-conformists of the 1930s
- Main interests: Christian democracy; metaphysics; theology
- Notable ideas: Communitarian personalism

Emmanuel Mounier (/muːnˈjeɪ/; French: [munje]; 1 April 1905 – 22 March 1950) was a French philosopher, Catholic theologian, teacher and essayist.

== Biography ==
Mounier was the guiding spirit in the French personalist movement, and founder and director of Esprit, the magazine which was the organ of the movement. He was a brilliant scholar at the Sorbonne. In 1929, when he was only twenty-four, he came under the influence of the French writer Charles Péguy, to whom he ascribed the inspiration of the personalist movement. Mounier's personalism became a main influence of the non-conformists of the 1930s.

Peter Maurin used to say wherever he went, "There is a man in France called Emmanuel Mounier. He wrote a book called The Personalist Manifesto. You should read that book."

He taught at the Lycée du Parc at Lyon and at the Lycee Français Jean Monnet at Brussels.

Although Mounier was critical of the Moscow Trials of the 1930s, he has been criticized by the historian Tony Judt, among others, for his failure to condemn the excesses of Stalinism in the postwar period.

In 1939, Mounier commented in a restrained manner on the newly elected Pope Pius XII remaining silent on the Italian invasion of Albania. Thus, Mounier has contributed to the debate about Pope Pius XII's controversial stance on the Holocaust.

== Works ==
First editions

- La pensée de Charles Péguy, Plon, coll. "Roseau d'Or", 1931.
- Révolution personnaliste et communautaire, Paris, Éd. Montaigne, 1934.
- De la propriété capitaliste à la propriété humaine, Desclée de Brouwer, coll. "Questions disputées", 1936.
- Manifeste au service du personnalisme, Éd. Montaigne, 1936.
- Pacifistes ou Bellicistes, Paris, Éditions du Cerf, 1939.
- L'affrontement chrétien, Neuchâtel, Éditions de la Baconnière, 1944.
- Montalembert (Morceaux choisis), Fribourg, L.U.F., coll. "Le Cri de la France", 1945.
- Liberté sous conditions, Paris, Éditions du Seuil, 1946.
- Traité du caractère, Paris, Éditions du Seuil, 1946.
- Introduction aux existentialismes, Paris, Denoël, 1946.
- Qu'est-ce que le personnalisme ?, Paris, Éditions du Seuil, 1947.
- L'éveil de l'Afrique noire, Paris, Éditions du Seuil, 1948.
- La Petite Peur du XXe siècle, Paris, Éditions du Seuil, 1948.
- Feu la Chrétienté, Paris, Éditions du Seuil, 1950.
- Les certitudes difficiles, Paris, Éditions du Seuil, 1951.
- Mounier et sa génération. Lettres, carnets et inédits, Paris, Éditions du Seuil, 1956.
- Personalism, University of Notre Dame, 1986.

Complete works (1961-1962)

- Œuvres, 4 volumes, Paris, éd. du Seuil, 1961-1962 (out of print / épuisé) :
  - I. 1931–1939 (livres et choix d’articles / books and selected articles)
  - II. Traité du caractère
  - III. 1944-1950 (livres / books)
  - IV. Recueils posthumes et correspondances (Posthumous collections and correspondence ).

Modern reprints available

- L'Engagement de la foi, textes choisis et présentés par Paulette Mounier, introduction de Guy Coq, Paris, Éditions Parole et silence, 2005, (1st edition: Paris, Le Seuil, 1968).
- Le Personnalisme, Paris, PUF, Collection "Que sais-je ?" n°395, 2001 (1st edition 1950).
- Refaire la Renaissance, préface de Guy Coq, Paris, Le Seuil, Collection Points-Essais, 2000.
- Écrits sur le personnalisme, préface de Paul Ricœur, Le Seuil, Collection Points-Essais, 2000.
- Mounier et sa génération. Lettres, carnets et inédits, Paris, Éditeur Parole et Silence, 2000 (1st edition 1956).
- La Petite Peur du 20e siècle, préface de Paul Ricœur, éditions R&N, 2020.

== See also ==
- Ligue de la jeune République
