= 1920 in France =

- Decades: 1900s; 1910s; 1920s; 1930s; 1940s
- See also: History of France; Timeline of French history; List of years in France

Events from the year 1920 in France.

== Incumbents ==
- President:
  - until 18 February: Raymond Poincaré
  - 18 February – 21 September: Paul Deschanel
  - starting 21 September: Alexandre Millerand
- President of the Council of Ministers:
  - until 20 January: Georges Clemenceau
  - 20 January – 24 September: Alexandre Millerand
  - starting 24 September: Georges Leygues

== Events ==
In the opening of the year 1920, France was in a stronger position than she had been in for several generations. The Allied victory over Germany and the restoration of Alsace-Lorraine to France had placed France in the position which she occupied during the 17th and 18th century - that of the strongest power on the European continent. At the beginning of the year Raymond Poincaré was still president and Georges Clemenceau was still prime minister, but as both senatorial and presidential elections were due in January, important political changes occurred early in the year. At the general election for the Chamber of Deputies which took place in November 1919, there had been a strong tendency towards Conservatism, the Socialist Party being badly defeated. The elections for the Senate were held on 11 January, and these exhibited the same trend of opinion as had been shown in the previous autumn. Owing to the postponement of elections during the war, two-thirds of the nine-year senatorial seats had to be contested, and altogether 240 senators had to be elected. The elections proved to be an overwhelming victory for the various Liberal and Republican groups, who secured 218 seats. The parties of the Right won 20 seats, and the Socialists won 2.

While these important events were taking place in the internal politics of France, the final stages in the ratifying of the peace treaty with Germany were being passed through. The Treaty of Versailles was to come into force so soon as it had been ratified by Germany and by three of the principal Allied and Associated Powers; and since it had now been ratified by Germany and by France, the United Kingdom, Italy, and Japan (though not by the United States), it was only necessary that the protocols certifying these facts should be signed by the parties to the treaty, and formal peace would then exist between the Allied Powers and Germany. The Supreme Council of the Allies decided that this final ceremony should take place in Paris on 10 January. Two delegates were sent by the German government to carry out the signing of the protocol, Baron Kurt von Lersner and Herr von Simson. The ceremony took place at the Ministry of Foreign Affairs in the Quai d'Orsay shortly after four o'clock on the afternoon of 10 January. The protocol was signed by Clemenceau for France, by David Lloyd George for Britain, by Francesco Saverio Nitti for Italy, and by Keishiro Matsui for Japan; and, of course, by the two German delegates. The protocol was also signed by the representatives of various minor Allied and Associated countries, which had already ratified the treaty, these being Belgium, Bolivia, Brazil, Czechoslovakia, Guatemala, Panama, Peru, Poland, Siam, and Uruguay. The formal end of the war was timed at 6:15 p.m. on 10 January, but the actual signing of the protocol took place, as already stated, somewhat earlier on that same afternoon.

On 14 January, Léon Bourgeois was elected president of the Senate. And the election of the new president of France, by a joint session of the two houses of the legislature, was fixed for 17 January. The two most important candidates were Paul Deschanel and Clemenceau. Among the other candidates was Field Marshal Ferdinand Foch, who, however, secured very little support. The rivalry between Deschanel and Clemenceau revealed certain very interesting tendencies in French politics. The contest turned mainly on the terms of peace which had been imposed upon Germany. Clemenceau's supporters contended that the terms of the Treaty of Versailles were satisfactory from the French point of view; his opponents declared that he had given way too much to the American and British standpoints, and that the peace was unsatisfactory, particularly in respect of the guarantees for the reparations due to France and in the matter of the French eastern frontier. A large body of French opinion had desired that France should secure the line of the Rhine as her eastern frontier. Deschanel represented these critics of the Treaty of Versailles. A preliminary ballot of the Republican groups gave 408 votes to Deschanel, and 389 votes to Clemenceau; and when this result was announced Clemenceau withdrew his candidature, but his name figured, nevertheless, in the formal voting of the National Assembly on 17 January. Altogether 888 legislators cast their votes, and Deschanel secured no fewer than 734 votes. The success of Deschanel was regarded in France as in some sense a victory for the opponents of the Treaty of Versailles. Deschanel was born in 1856, and had held the office of president of the Chamber of Deputies. Poincaré was to remain in office as president until 18 February.

On 18 January, Clemenceau resigned from office as premier; and Poincaré entrusted Alexandre Millerand with the task of forming a cabinet. Millerand found no difficulty in obtaining the necessary support, and the full list of the members of his cabinet was published two days later. F. Marsal was minister of finance, A. Lefevre was minister of war, and A. Sarraut was minister for the colonies. Millerand, who himself took the portfolio of foreign affairs, was sixty years of age, and had greatly distinguished himself as minister for war during the critical days of 1914. His first reception by the Chamber of Deputies was somewhat stormy, and a vote of confidence on 22 January was only passed by 281 votes to 240. But a second vote of confidence on 30 January was passed by 510 votes to 70.

On 5 February and 6 February, there was an important debate on foreign policy in the Chamber of Deputies; and a long speech was delivered by the prime minister. He said that the new cabinet had every intention of continuing the same foreign policy which had enabled France to surround herself with such faithful allies during the war. In reference to the Adriatic problem, Millerand said that the only desire of France was to reach a satisfactory solution of the difficulties existing in this part of the world - a solution in perfect agreement with the sister nation of Italy and with the Serbian people. In regard to the Bulgarian question the premier said that on the previous day he had received news that the Bulgarian parliament had ratified the treaty. Passing on to a consideration of the proposed peace terms for Turkey, Millerand answered certain criticisms which had been made earlier in the debate by Marcel Cachin. France, he declared, had important and historic interests in the East, and these she had no intention of abandoning. "M. Cachin declared yesterday that we appeared to be threatening the independence of the Syrian populations. No French government has ever entertained such a design, and it is a libel on France to reproach her with a policy of conquest which has never entered her mind. The only wish of France is to give these populations justice and a good administration. When yesterday I heard the government credited with intentions which it has not, I seemed to hear an echo of the slanders levelled by the German government at the work of France in Morocco."

Turning to the question of relations with Russia, Millerand said that contrary to the allegations of Cachin, Britain had been true to her agreements, and none of the Allies had entered into any agreement with the Soviet government. In regard to Poland, the French government intended to maintain the closest friendship with that country, and if she were attacked by the Bolsheviks she would receive every support. Finally, the prime minister dealt with the carrying out of the Treaty of Versailles. He said that the cabinet intended to maintain complete accord with France's allies; and although it was regrettable that the United States had not so far ratified the treaty, yet the Reparations Commission had begun its work smoothly, and he felt no anxiety as to the ultimate adhesion of America to the treaty. He said that Germany had been dilatory in the matter of fulfilling the stipulations of the treaty, particularly in regard to the essential deliveries of coal. "I mean to avail myself at the right moment of all the means placed at my disposal by the treaty, and I declare, without making any kind of threat, but merely in order that the position may be quite clear and well understood, that we do not intend to claim anything from Germany to which she is not strictly bound under the terms of the treaty, but we shall exact everything she owes us, and to obtain it we shall have recourse to the measures of all kinds provided for in the treaty."

After the conclusion of the debate the house passed a vote of confidence in the government by 513 votes to 68.

After his assumption of office on 18 February, Deschanel sent the usual presidential message to parliament. Deschanel said that there was no higher destiny than that of serving France, and he thanked the legislators for having permitted him to continue to serve her in union with themselves. He hoped to maintain the national unity which had been so conspicuous during the war. "Our first duty is to define clearly our diplomatic, military, economic, and financial policy to the country. We can only build up our policy for the future on sound bases. I appeal to all the experience and talent of the members of this assembly on behalf of this act of sincerity and moral probity. To strengthen the unity between all peoples who fought for the right, and who, by reason of that fact, are great, to strengthen the bonds with those peoples whose affinities or interests bind them to us - this is the first guarantee of peace and the basis of that League of Nations to which the Treaty of Versailles entrusted the execution of certain capital clauses, and which we should support by means of effective action in order to spare the world fresh horrors. France wishes that the treaty to which Germany appended her signature shall be obeyed, and that the aggressor shall not take from her the fruits of her heroic sacrifices. She means to live in security. Today, as yesterday, our policy is an affair of will-power, energy, and faith. The Russian people fought by our side during three years for the cause of Liberty; may it, master of itself, soon resume in the plenitude of its genius the course of its civilizing mission. The Eastern question causes periodical wars. The fate of the Ottoman Empire has not yet been settled. Our secular interests, rights, and traditions ought to be safeguarded there too."

Turning to questions of internal politics, Deschanel said that the work of restoring France to prosperity would be arduous, and he declared that the person who evaded the payment of taxes was acting like a soldier who deserts his post on the field of battle. It was essential that conflicts between capital and labour should be avoided. In his peroration Deschanel exhorted the legislators to follow in the footsteps of the heroic Frenchmen who had won the war: "We shall accomplish our formidable task if we keep in our souls that sacred flame which rendered France the Republic Invincible, and saved the world."

In the middle of February the trial of Joseph Caillaux, the ex-prime minister of France, who had been under arrest for treason since January 1918, commenced. The case was regarded as the most important of the treason trials, of which there had been a long series since the middle of the war. Caillaux was tried before the Senate, sitting as a High Court of Justice, with Léon Bourgeois as president of the court. The prolonged delay in bringing Caillaux to trial was because investigations had to be made in many different parts of the world, including South America. Caillaux was charged with "having sought to weaken the security of the state abroad by intrigues, machination, and intelligence with the enemy of a nature likely to favour enemy action in regard to France, or her Allies, fighting against common enemies, and thus to advance the progress of the enemy armies." M. Lescouvé (the public prosecutor), M. Moinet, and others appeared for the prosecution. M. Giafferi, M. Moutet, and others appeared for the defense. The trial was extremely long and also in many respects extremely dramatic. The trial began, on 17 February, with a series of interrogations by the president of the court, and this part of the scene alone lasted for several days. Next there came a cross-examination of the prisoner by the public prosecutor. Many of Caillaux's activities were investigated in great detail and at great length. He was questioned regarding his relations with an enemy agent named Minotto, in South America, regarding his relations with another enemy agent, a certain Count Lipscher, and also in regard to his associations with the traitors Lenoir, Bolo, and Duval, who had already been executed for treason. The prisoner had also to account for his close association with various schemers in Italy, including the notorious Cavallini. During these interrogations, Caillaux frequently made long speeches on all manner of political questions. In the matter of Count Lipscher little to his discredit appears to have transpired; but apart from the details of the investigation it was obvious that if the prisoner had been entirely innocent of the charges brought against him, he had had a surprising amount of association with undesirable persons. And it was also established that the German government regarded Caillaux as the right man to approach under circumstances favourable to Germany. Moutet, speaking for the defense, attributed political motives to the accusers, and said that notwithstanding the fact that the world had been ransacked for evidence for many months, the evidence produced was of a ridiculous and trumpery character. After many weeks of investigation the capital charge of treason was dismissed, and the prosecution did not ask for the death sentence; but Caillaux was found guilty on the minor count of correspondence with the enemy, and was sentenced to three years' imprisonment, ten years' interdiction of rights of voting and eligibility for any public function, and five years' prohibition from appearing in certain places indicated by the government. It was found that his relations with Bolo and Almereyda did not fall within the penal code, but he was condemned for his friendship with Minotto, Cavallini, and to some extent for his association with Count Lipscher. Having already served more than two years' imprisonment, Caillaux was set at liberty at the end of the trial. The verdict was given on 23 April.

During the spring there were serious labour troubles in France. At the end of February a serious dispute arose on the Paris, Lyon, and Mediterranean Railway system, owing to disciplinary measures which had been taken against one man. A strike was declared on that line on 25 February, and subsequently spread to the state lines also. The government immediately called to the colours those employees who were in the Army Reserve. A general strike of railwaymen was declared on 29 February; but the response was only partial, and an agreement was reached within twenty-four hours. At the beginning of May another railway strike broke out, and on this occasion the labour agitators hoped to make the strike universal, and it was supported by the General Confederation of Labour (CGT), who called out the seamen, dockers, and miners in support of the railwaymen. The aims of the General Confederation were not only economic, but also partly political; and they announced that they aimed at the international allotment of war burdens, an economic entente of all peoples on a basis of cooperation, at the cessation of all colonial expeditions, and at general disarmament. The response to the call on the part of the workers was, however, half-hearted and partial, though in certain localities, including Marseille, the strike was almost universal. The strike was extremely unpopular in the country at large, and the government took legal proceedings against the revolutionary ring-leaders. Within a week it was clear that the strike would fail, owing to the apathy or actual hostility of a large part of the working classes, but it was not until 21 May that the leaders of the General Confederation declared the strike at an end.

In February the government issued a new 5% state loan, which became known as the "Recovery Loan". The subscription lists remained open for several weeks, and it was announced in April that the total amount subscribed was 15,700,000,000 francs.

During the spring and summer certain differences of opinion, important but not fundamental, arose between the French and British governments. In a debate in the Chamber of Deputies on 25 March, Louis Barthou, who had once been prime minister and was now chairman of the Foreign Affairs Committee of the lower house, delivered a speech on foreign policy generally in which he took occasion to attack the policy of the British government. He complained that Britain had profited more than any other country by the terms of the Treaty of Versailles; and that the course of events had recently been such that the hatred of Germany was now directed almost exclusively against France. This was, he said, particularly the case in the matter of permitting Germany to deal with her own war criminals, for which concession Britain had gained all the credit in German eyes. The speaker made various other complaints against the British government in general and Lloyd George in particular; but it was clear before the end of his speech that he did not carry the Chamber with him. On the following day, Millerand made a reply in which he endeavoured to remove the bad impression created by Barthou's speech. The prime minister said that there was no "crisis in the alliance"; and he pointed out that the reason the concession to Germany in the matter of the war criminals was signed by the British prime minister was that at the time the note was sent the peace conference was sitting in London. The premier said, however, that France was determined to see the terms of the Treaty of Versailles fulfilled, and although the British government were in favour of allowing the German government to send troops into the Ruhr District, to suppress the Spartacist insurrection there, France viewed these movements of troops with grave concern.

The differences between the French and British governments were also apparent at the beginning of April, when the German government was suppressing the Spartacist revolt. To the east of the Allied armies in the occupied portion of Germany there was a neutral zone, into which, by the terms of the Treaty of Versailles, the German government were not allowed to send troops. During the Spartacist insurrection which followed the coup d'état in Berlin (see 1920 in Germany), the revolutionaries in the valley of the Ruhr, a highly industrialized district which was included in the neutral zone, took advantage of the unavoidable absence of the government forces to seize control of the entire administration of this important part of Germany. The German government applied for permission to send forces into this part of the neutral zone in the exceptional circumstances which had arisen, as without doing so it was impossible for them to overcome the revolt in the neutral zone itself, or to prevent the successful insurrection in that zone lending important support to the Spartacists farther east. The British, Italian, and American governments were all in favour of allowing the German government, which in the circumstances existing was a bulwark against the spread of Bolshevism, to send a limited number of troops into the neutral zone until law and order had been reestablished there. The French government, however, interposed obstacles to the granting of any such license to the German government. The revolt continued to spread, and at the beginning of April German troops marched into the Ruhr Valley to restore order, although no permission for them to do so had been granted by the Allies as a whole. Thereupon the French government, without the consent of the British and Italian governments, ordered their own troops to march forward into the neutral zone - though not into the same part of the neutral zone - and to occupy various German towns as a penalty for the German advance. Frankfurt, Darmstadt, and Hanau were occupied on 6 April, and Homburg was entered on the following day. Black troops took part in the advance, a point which gave special umbrage to the Germans. This independent action on the part of the French government led to an interchange of somewhat sharp notes between London and Paris, the British government taking exception both to the French advance in itself and still more so to the fact that the advance had been made without due consultation with the other Allied governments. Within a few days, however, an agreement between the French and British governments was reached. The black troops were immediately withdrawn, and the French government made it clear that in the future they would not act without securing the consent of the other Allies. The British government on their side made it clear that they intended to see the terms of the Treaty of Versailles respected by the German government. After the suppression of the Ruhr revolt, both the German and French troops were withdrawn.

During the spring and summer there were various conferences between the French, British, and other Allied governments, at San Remo, Hythe, Spa, and elsewhere, these conferences relating largely to the reparations due from Germany under the terms of the Treaty of Versailles. At these discussions similar differences of opinion appear to have existed between the British and French representatives, the British being more disposed than the French to recognize the difficulties with which the German government were confronted. But these differences of opinion only related to questions of method, and were in no way fundamental. In the middle of May Poincaré, the ex-president of France, resigned his position as president of the Reparations Commission, on account of what he regarded as the undue leniency which had been shown towards Germany. Millerand stated publicly, however, that he thought Poincaré's fears were groundless.

In May President Paul Deschanel became mentally incapacitated; he resigned his office in September. It was soon evident that the great majority of public men desired that Millerand should himself become president. The premier at first declined to accede to these demands, but after some delay he consented to do so. The election took place on 23 September, and out of 892 votes cast, no fewer than 695 were given Millerand. A Socialist candidate, Gustave Delory, obtained 69 votes. Millerand announced that he hoped somewhat to increase the powers of the presidential office, particularly in regard to foreign policy. Georges Leygues became prime minister and minister for foreign affairs; but otherwise the composition of the cabinet remained unchanged. On 25 September the Chamber of Deputies passed a vote of confidence in the new government by 515 votes to 71. It was notable that in the statements issued both by the new president and by the new government, it was proclaimed that France would do her utmost to make the League of Nations a success. At the end of November Leygues visited London to confer with British and Italian statesmen on the Greek crisis and other matters.

In the middle of November it was announced that the government proposed to reduce the period of military service from two years to eighteen months.

In November Lord Derby, the British ambassador in Paris, retired from that office, and was succeeded by Lord Hardinge. It was also announced that Paul Cambon, the veteran French ambassador in London, would retire in January 1921.

Throughout the year there was considerable, though intermittent, discussion on the proposal that France should resume diplomatic relations with the Vatican; and at the end of November the government proposal to renew relations was approved by the Chamber of Deputies by 387 votes to 210.

The defeat of the Socialists at the general election of 1919 appeared to have caused that party to become more extreme in its views. And after much discussion throughout the year 1920, a great Socialist conference held at Tours in December voted by a large majority in favour of adhesion to the so-called Third International, the international organization of Socialists which was under the control of the Bolsheviks of Moscow.

The financial situation in France gave occasion for most serious anxiety. Among other unfavourable features, the exchange value of the franc had fallen greatly since the end of the war, and, with fluctuations, stood at about 60 francs to the pound sterling during most of the year; and the value of the franc in terms of the American dollar was even lower.

The ordinary budget for 1920 provided for a revenue of 15,885,000,000 francs and for an expenditure of 17,860,000,000 francs. It was anticipated that the extraordinary expenditure would amount to over 7,000,000,000 francs.

- 2 February - France occupies the Memel Territory of East Prussia.
- 23 February–4 March, 4–29 May - 1920 French railway strikes.
- 26 March - The German government asks France for permission to use its own troops against the rebellious Ruhr Red Army in the French-occupied area.
- 10 May - Agnès Souret is elected "The most beautiful woman in France", retrospectively considered the first Miss France.
- 16 May - Joan of Arc is canonised. Over 30,000 people attended the ceremony in Rome, including 140 descendants of Joan of Arc's family. Pope Benedict XV presides over the rite.
- 17 May - French and Belgian troops leave the cities they have occupied in Germany.
- 4 June - Treaty of Trianon: a treaty of peace between the Allies and Hungary.
- 14 July - France declares that Faisal I of Syria is deposed and occupies Damascus and Aleppo.
- 21 July - Interallied Mission to Poland is launched.
- 24 July - The French defeat the Syrian army in the Battle of Maysalun.
- 31 July - France prohibits the sale or prescription of contraceptives.
- 10 August - Treaty of Sèvres is signed.
- 23 December - United Kingdom and France ratify the border between French-held Syria and British Mandate Palestine.

== Sport ==
- 27 June - Tour de France begins.
- 27 July - Tour de France ends, won by Philippe Thys of Belgium.

== Births ==
=== January to March ===
- 10 January
  - Raymond Cauchetier, photographer (died 2021)
  - Georges Marchal, actor (died 1997)
- 14 January - Jean Dutourd, novelist (died 2011)
- 16 January - Claude Abadie, jazz clarinetist (died 2020)
- 17 January - Georges Pichard, comics artist (died 2003)
- 18 January - Fernand Oury, teacher and creator of modern French schooling (died 1997)
- 30 January - Robert Hersant, newspaper magnate (died 1996)
- 2 February - Raymond Daudel, theoretical and quantum chemist (died 2006)
- 18 February - Rolande Falcinelli, organist, pianist and composer (died 2006)
- 22 February
  - André Barrais, basketball player (died 2004)
  - Henri de Laulanie, Jesuit priest and agriculturalist (died 1995)
- 25 February - Jean Emile Charon, nuclear physicist (died 1998)
- 27 February - Jacques Charon, actor and film director (died 1975)
- 4 March - Jean Lecanuet, politician (died 1993)
- 8 March - Michel Moine, journalist and parapsychologist (died 2005)
- 10 March - Boris Vian, writer, poet and musician (died 1959)
- 12 March - Françoise d'Eaubonne, feminist writer (died 2005)
- 18 March - Pierre Plantard, draughtsman, principal perpetrator of the Priory of Sion hoax (died 2000)
- 29 March
  - Bertrand Gille, historian of technology (died 1980)
  - Pierre Moinot, novelist (died 2007)

=== April to June ===
- 7 April - Jean Marsan, screenwriter and actor (died 1977)
- 13 April – Marthe Cohn, member of the French resistance during World War II and nurse (died 2025)
- 15 April - Roger Rondeaux, cyclo-cross racer (died 1999)
- 8 May - Jean Maran, politician (died 2021)
- 13 May - Roger Calmel, composer (died 1998)
- 6 June - Serge Lang, journalist, alpine skier, and founder of the alpine skiing World Cup (died 1999)
- 7 June - Georges Marchais, head of the French Communist Party (died 1997)
- 9 June - Pierre Lambert, Trotskyist leader (died 2008)
- 17 June - François Jacob, biologist, shared the 1965 Nobel Prize in Medicine (died 2013)

=== July to September ===
- 1 July - Henri Amouroux, historian and journalist (died 2007)
- 1 July - Henri Legay, operatic tenor (died 1992)
- 20 July - Robert Boulin, politician (died 1979)
- 25 July - Jean Carmet, actor (died 1994)
- 24 August - Jean Desailly, actor (died 2008)
- 5 September - Jean Lartéguy, writer, journalist, and former soldier (died 2011)
- 8 September - Madeleine Rebérioux, historian (died 2005)

=== October to December ===
- 15 October - Henri Verneuil, playwright and filmmaker (died 2002)
- 24 October - Robert-Joseph Coffy, Roman Catholic Cardinal (died 1995)
- 24 October - Marcel-Paul Schützenberger, mathematician (died 1996)
- 25 October - Geneviève de Gaulle-Anthonioz, member of the French Resistance and president of ATD Quart Monde (died 2002)
- 28 October - Bernard Pertuiset, neurosurgeon (died 2000)
- 29 October - Guy Héraud, politician and lawyer (died 2003)
- 31 October - Joseph Gelineau, priest and composer (died 2008)
- 31 October - Jean Royer, politician, former Minister, and former Mayor of Tours (died 2011)
- 28 November - René Chocat, basketball player (died 2000)
- 30 November - Denise Glaser, French television producer (died 1983)
- 1 December - Pierre Poujade, politician (died 2003)
- 5 December - Roger Lévêque, cyclist (died 2002)
- 26 December - Maurice Gendron, cellist and teacher (died 1990)

=== Full date unknown ===
- François Boyer, screenwriter (died 2003)
- René Le Hir, Breton nationalist (died 1999)

== Deaths ==
- 2 January - Paul Adam, novelist (born 1862)
- 26 January - Jeanne Hébuterne, artist and subject for Amedeo Modigliani (born 1898)
- 11 February - Gaby Deslys, dancer and actress (born 1881)
- 25 February - Marcel-Auguste Dieulafoy, archaeologist (born 1844)
- 17 May - Jean-Louis Pascal, academic architect (born 1837)
- 14 June - Gabrielle Réjane, actress (born 1856)
- 20 June - Marie Adolphe Carnot, chemist, mining engineer and politician (born 1839)
- 11 July - Eugénie de Montijo, widow of Napoleon III (born 1826)
- 31 August - Louis Ducos du Hauron, pioneer of colour photography (born 1837)
- 7 October - Gaston Floquet, mathematician (born 1847)
- 13 November
  - Luc-Olivier Merson, painter and illustrator (born 1846)
  - Hans-Georg Tersling, Danish-born architect (born 1857)
- 12 December - Paul Lacôme, composer (born 1838)

== See also ==
- List of French films of 1920

== Sources ==
Much of the text in the "Events" section of this article was copied verbatim from The Annual Register: 1920 (London: Longman's Green, 1921) – see online edition and online pp 158ff.). This source was published before 1923 and is out of copyright.
