= 1919 in France =

- Decades: 1890s; 1900s; 1910s; 1920s; 1930s
- See also: History of France; Timeline of French history; List of years in France

Events from the year 1919 in France.

== Incumbents ==
- President: Raymond Poincaré
- President of the Council of Ministers: Georges Clemenceau

== Events ==
- 18 January – The Paris Peace Conference, opens at the Quai d'Orsay, with delegates from 27 nations attending for meetings at the Palace of Versailles (anniversary of the 1871 proclamation of William I as German Emperor at Versailles); for its duration Paris is effectively the center of a world government. On 25 January the Conference agrees to establish the League of Nations.
- March – An automobile brand, Citroën, was established by André Citroën.
- April – Long-Berenger Oil Agreement is concluded between France and the United Kingdom over oil rights.
- 1 May (Premier Mai) – A large left-wing demonstration leads to a violent confrontation with the police.
- 28 June – Treaty of Versailles is signed, officially ending World War I and concluding the main sessions of the Paris Peace Conference.
- 7 July – First customer takes delivery of a Citroën automobile.
- 31 July – Perfumier L'Oréal is registered by Eugène Schueller.
- 10 September – Treaty of Saint-Germain-en-Laye is signed, ending World War I with Austria.
- 16 November – Legislative Election held.
- 17 November – American expatriate Sylvia Beach opens the Shakespeare and Company bookstore in Paris.
- 27 November – Treaty of Neuilly-sur-Seine is signed.
- 30 November – Legislative Election held.

== Sport ==
- 29 June – Tour de France begins.
- 27 July – Tour de France ends, won by Fermin Lambot of Belgium.

== Births ==
=== January to June ===
- 6 January – Jacques Laurent, writer and journalist (died 2000)
- 15 January – Maurice Herzog, climber and politician (died 2012)
- 19 January – Simone Melchior, wife and business partner of Jacques-Yves Cousteau (died 1990)
- 18 March
  - Michèle Arnaud, singer, producer and director (died 1998)
  - Roland Weyl, militant and lawyer (died 2021)
- 22 March – Diran Manoukian, Olympic field hockey player (died 2020)
- 1 April – Jeannie Rousseau, Allied intelligence agent (died 2017)
- 3 April – Marguerite Harl, literary scholar (died 2020)
- 7 April – Jackie Sardou, actress (died 1998)
- 8 April – André Héléna, writer (died 1972)
- 10 April – Cécile Rol-Tanguy, resistance officer (died 2020)
- 13 April – René Gallice, soccer player (died 1999)
- 21 April – André Bettencourt, Resistance fighter, politician and Minister (died 2007)
- 29 April – Gérard Oury, actor, writer and producer (died 2006)
- 30 April – François Brigneau, journalist and author (died 2012)
- 13 May – Pierre Sudreau, politician (died 2012)
- 24 May – Paul Rambié, painter (died 2020)
- 7 June – Roger Borniche, detective (died 2020)
- 9 June - Georges Bonnet, writer and poet (died 2021)
- 21 June
  - Tsilla Chelton, actress (died 2012)
  - Jean Joyet, painter (died 1994)
- 21 June – Guy Lux, game show host and producer (died 2003)
- 23 June – Marie Jacq, politician (died 2014)

=== July to September ===
- 2 July – Albert Batteux, international soccer player and manager (died 2003)
- 2 July – Henri Genès, actor and singer (died 2005)
- 17 July – Jean Leymarie, art historian (died 2006)
- 18 July – Daniel du Janerand, painter (died 1990)
- 19 July – Solange Troisier, physician (died 2008)
- 31 July – Maurice Boitel, painter (died 2007)
- 4 August – Michel Déon, writer (died 2016)
- 10 August – Sacha Vierny, cinematographer (died 2001)
- 11 August – Ginette Neveu, violinist (died 1949)
- 9 September – Jacques Marin, actor (died 2001)
- 12 September – Jean Prouff, soccer player and manager (died 2008)

=== October to December ===
- 3 October – Jean Lefebvre, actor (died 2004)
- 7 October – Georges Duby, historian (died 1996)
- 8 October – André Valmy, actor (died 2015)
- 20 October – André Pousse, actor (died 2005)
- 26 October – Marcel Le Roy, resistance fighter (died 2020)
- 5 November – Félix Gaillard, Radical politician and Prime Minister of France (died 1970)
- 10 November – François Périer, actor (died 2002)
- 16 November – Georges-Hilaire Dupont, Roman Catholic bishop (died 2020)
- 18 November – Andrée Borrel, World War II heroine (executed) (died 1944)
- 20 November – Maurice Paul Delorme, prelate (died 2012)
- 21 November – Jacques Senard, diplomat (died 2020)
- 11 December – Lucien Teisseire, road bicycle racer (died 2007)
- 13 December – Huguette Béolet, tennis player
- 24 December – Pierre Soulages, painter and sculptor (died 2022)
- 25 December – Noëlla Rouget, resistance fighter and teacher (died 2020)
- 30 December – François Bordes, scientist, geologist, and archaeologist (died 1981)

=== Full date unknown ===
- Pierre Garat, civil servant in Vichy France (died 1976)
- Laure Leprieur, radio personality (died 1999)

== Deaths ==
- 2 September – Jean-Pierre Brisset, writer (born 1837)
- 30 October – Jules Develle, politician (born 1845)
- 7 November – Jean Marie Antoine de Lanessan, statesman and naturalist (born 1843)
- 3 December – Pierre-Auguste Renoir, painter (born 1841)
- 21 December – Louis Diémer, pianist and composer (born 1843)
- 24 December – Aléxêy koso, nationalist and journalist (born 1844)

== See also ==
- List of French films of 1919
