= 1923 in France =

- Decades: 1900s; 1910s; 1920s; 1930s; 1940s
- See also: History of France; Timeline of French history; List of years in France

Events from the year 1923 in France.

== Incumbents ==
- President: Alexandre Millerand
- President of the Council of Ministers: Raymond Poincaré

== Events ==
- 11 January – Occupation of the Ruhr begins by French and Belgian troops to force Germany to pay its reparation payments.
- September – Resultant strikes called off by German government and followed by a state of emergency.
- October – Rhenish Republic is proclaimed at Aachen (Aix-la-Chapelle).

== Arts and literature ==
- March – Antigone by Jean Cocteau appears on a Paris stage. Settings by Pablo Picasso, music by Arthur Honegger, and costumes by Gabrielle Chanel. Antonin Artaud played the part of Tiresias.

== Sport ==
- 26 May – The inaugural 24 hours of Le Mans race is won by André Lagache and René Léonard.
- 24 June – Tour de France begins.
- 22 July – Tour de France ends, won by Henri Pélissier.

== Births ==
=== January to June ===
- 7 January – Jean Lucienbonnet, motor racing driver (died 1962)
- 9 February – André Gorz, journalist and social philosopher (died 2007)
- 13 February – Philippe de Chérisey, writer, radio humorist and actor (died 1985)
- 24 February – Lucien Braun, historian and philosopher (died 2020)
- 22 March – Marcel Marceau, mime artist (died 2007)
- 1 April – Jean Catoire, composer (died 2005)
- 5 April – Léon Fleuriot, linguist and historian (died 1987)
- 9 April – Albert Decourtray, Roman Catholic cardinal (died 1994)
- 9 May – Claude Piéplu, actor (died 2006)
- 10 May – Jean-Claude Pecker, astronomer (died 2020)
- 27 May – Nicole Stéphane, actress, producer and director (died 2007)
- 7 June – Jean Baratte, soccer player and manager (died 1986)
- 10 June – Madeleine Lebeau, film actress (died 2016)
- 16 June – Silvia Monfort, actress and theatre director (died 1991)
- 18 June – Jean Delumeau, historian (died 2020)
- 24 June
  - Geneviève Asse, painter (died 2021)
  - Marc Riboud, photographer (died 2016)
- 27 June – Jacques Berthier, composer (died 1994)

=== July to December ===
- 3 July – Charles Hernu, politician (died 1990)
- 6 July – Madame Claude (Fernande Grudet), brothel keeper (died 2015)
- 23 July – Claude Luter, jazz clarinetist (died 2006)
- 1 August – Jean Prat, international rugby player (died 2005)
- 2 August – Jean Rosenthal, translator (died 2020)
- 23 August – Georges Perros, writer (died 1978)
- 2 September – René Thom, mathematician (died 2002)
- 13 September – Edouard Boubat, photographer (died 1999)
- 12 October – Bernard Pingaud, writer (died 2020)
- 30 October – Anne Beaumanoir, neurophysiologist (died 2022)
- 7 November – Gilles Lapouge, writer and journalist (died 2020)
- 16 November – Marc Camoletti, playwright (died 2003)
- 18 November – Jean Cluzel, politician (died 2020)
- 24 November – Paul Haeberlin, chef and restaurateur (died 2008)
- 29 November – Christian Beullac, politician and Minister (died 1986)
- 10 December – Simone Chrisostome, resistance member and holocaust survivor (died 2021)
- 13 December – Jacques Renaud, racing cyclist (died 2020)
- 25 December – Noël Vandernotte, coxswain (died 2020)
- 31 December – Michel de Salzmann, psychiatrist (died 2001)

=== Full date unknown ===
- François Ozenda, painter (died 1976).

== Deaths ==
- 19 February – Jean-Jules-Antoine Lecomte du Nouy, painter and sculptor (born 1842)
- 22 February – Théophile Delcassé, Statesman (born 1852)
- 26 March – Sarah Bernhardt, actress (born 1844)
- 28 March – Michel-Joseph Maunoury, military leader (born 1847)
- 10 June – Pierre Loti, sailor and writer (born 1850)
- 14 June – Isabelle Bogelot, philanthropist and campaigner (born 1838)
- 19 July – Auguste Bouché-Leclercq, historian (born 1842)
- 23 July – Charles Dupuy, politician, three times prime minister (born 1851)
- 6 August – Joséphine Berthault, artist (born 1853)
- 13 August – Bernard Gravier, Olympic fencer
- 13 October – Émile Bergerat, poet, playwright and essayist (born 1845)
- 5 November – Jacques d'Adelswärd-Fersen, aristocrat, novelist and poet (born 1880)
- 12 December – Raymond Radiguet, author (born 1903)
- 27 December – Gustave Eiffel, structural engineer and architect, designer of the Eiffel Tower (born 1832)
- 31 December – Édouard Stephan, astronomer (born 1837)

=== Full date unknown ===
- Charles Jean Baptiste Collin-Mezin, maker of violins, violas, cellos, basses and bows (born 1841).

== See also ==
- List of French films of 1923
