= Maurice Paul =

Maurice Paul may refer to:

- Maurice M. Paul (1932–2016), American lawyer and judge
- Maurice Paul (footballer) (born 1992), German football goalkeeper

== See also ==
- Paul (father of Maurice) (died 593), father of Maurice, Byzantine Emperor
- Maurice Paul Auguste Charles Fabry (1867–1945), French physicist
- Paul Adrien Maurice Dirac (1902–1984), English theoretical physicist
- Paul Maurice Zoll (1911–1999), American cardiologist
- Maurice Paul Delorme (1919–2012), French prelate
- Paul Maurice (born 1967), Canadian ice hockey player
- Maurice and Paul Marciano Art Foundation, California arts foundation
