= 1921 in France =

- Decades: 1900s; 1910s; 1920s; 1930s; 1940s
- See also: History of France; Timeline of French history; List of years in France

Events from the year 1921 in France.

== Incumbents ==
- President: Alexandre Millerand
- President of the Council of Ministers: Georges Leygues (until 16 January), Aristide Briand (starting 15 January)

== Events ==
Alexandre Millerand had been elected president of the republic in 1920, with Georges Leygues taking his place as prime minister. Frequent changes of ministry had shown that even in peace times an unstable government was in a difficult situation. In a time of unrest and insecurity, the interests of the government might be wholly prejudicial to those of the country.

Millerand's acts during his ministry both in his domestic and his foreign policy had met with the unanimous approval of the nation, and his popularity reached its height in September 1920, when by 695 votes out of 892 he was elected president of the republic. Among the members of Parliament opposed to his appointment there were many keen partisans of the leader whose eminent qualities had been put to the test during a period of over eight months. They did not wish to see Millerand occupying a merely representative position, which is all the French constitution allows to the president. They wanted to see so able a man at the helm of the ship of state, with real and not apparent power. Hopes were therefore raised in some quarters that the constitution would be amended to give more scope to the president. But these hopes were dashed to the ground when, on 12 January, Leygues retired from office.

The Chamber of Deputies, by dismissing the minister selected by Millerand, expressed its wish to give power to a strong man whose conduct was not to be modified by any influence. Lack of firmness was the principal fault with which Leygues was charged by the majority of the Parliament. As a matter of fact, the dismissal of the premier was expected as an imminent event when Parliament reopened on 11 January.

On that day Raoul Péret, who was reelected chairman of the Chamber, delivered a most interesting speech dealing with the difficulties of the moment. Leygues' request for the postponement of the intended interpellations of several deputies until after the inter-Allied conference due on the 19th was refused in the House by 447 votes out of 563. The cabinet was therefore compelled to retire. Next day the Senate met and reelected Léon Bourgeois as its chairman.

Millerand confided to Péret, chairman of the Chamber, the task of constituting a new ministry. After having endeavoured to obtain the cooperation of various personalities specially designated by the voice of public opinion, Péret found he was unable to surmount the difficulties caused by private antagonisms. He was particularly unsuccessful in obtaining the support of Aristide Briand and Raymond Poincaré, whose views on certain points of foreign policy differed from his own.

Thereupon Briand was entrusted with the difficult task of forming a cabinet. Briand had already been premier three times. Born in 1862 at Nantes, he was first elected deputy in 1902 for the Department of Loire, which reelected him until 1914. He was minister of public instruction in 1906, minister of justice in 1908, and prime minister in 1909. He was again prime minister in 1913 and, during the war, from 1915 to 1917. In 1919 he was reelected deputy by the Department of Loire-Inférieure, the chief town of which is his native place.

Like most French politicians Briand had gradually changed his mind in the course of the last years before the war. From fervent socialism he turned towards moderate opinions; as they say in France, "he put water into his wine".

On 16 January Briand succeeded in constituting his cabinet as follows:

Presidency of the Cabinet Council and Minister for Foreign Affairs	Aristide Briand
Minister of Justice	Laurent Bonnevay
Minister of Finance	Paul Doumer
Minister of the Interior	Pierre Marraud
Minister of War	Louis Barthou
Minister of Marine	Gabriel Guist'hau
Minister of Public Instruction	Léon Bérard
Minister for the Liberated Districts and Reparations	Louis Loucheur
Minister of Agriculture	Edmond Lefebvre du Prey
Minister for the Colonies	Albert Sarraut
Minister of Commerce	Lucien Dior
Minister of Labour	Daniel Vincent
Minister of Pensions	André Maginot
Minister of Public Health	Georges Leredu
Minister of Public Works	Yves Le Trocquer

In accordance with the suggestion made by the British government that, owing to the French ministerial crisis, the inter-Allied conference should be postponed, the new government agreed that the conference should take place on 24 January.

On 17 January nine under-secretaries of state were appointed as follows:

Presidency of Cabinet Council	Théodore Tissier
Interior	Maurice Cobrat
Post and Telegraphs (Public Works)	Paul Laffont
Stocks (Finances)	André Paisant
Merchant Marine	Rio
Technical Instruction	Gaston Vidal
Liberated Districts	Lugol
Food (Agriculture)	Puis
Air Ministry	Laurent Eynac

The new cabinet appeared before Parliament on 20 January, the ministerial declaration being read by Briand in the Chamber and by Pierre Marraud in the Senate. This long declaration, modelled on the usual patterns, expressed much that was encouraging, but was not as explicit as the remarkable speech which Briand delivered on the following day, and which dealt with the political programme of the new government. In regard to foreign policy, Briand expressed his firm intention to make Germany pay, and he also promised to make every effort toward the revival of diplomatic relations with the Vatican.

The Chamber expressed its confidence in the new cabinet by 462 votes out of 539.

On the 24th, the Paris conference opened at the Foreign Office, with Briand in the chair. Eight days had been sufficient for him to make himself familiar with the grave problems of the moment, and France realized and valued the marvellous effort of the new premier.

The leading personalities of the delegations at the conference were: for France, Briand, Louis Barthou, and Philippe Berthelot; for Britain, David Lloyd George and Lord Curzon; for Italy, Count Carlo Sforza, Count Lelio Bonin Longare, and Marquis Pietro Tomasi Della Torretta; for Belgium, Henri Jaspar and Georges Theunis; and for Japan, Viscount Kikujiro Ishii.

The conference lasted five days, and was marked by a complete agreement among the Allies. The terms of the conditions of disarmament and reparations fixed by unanimous accord were forwarded to Germany.

On the day before the conference ended (28 January) there took place the solemn burial of the Unknown Soldier under the Arc de Triomphe. Barthou, the war minister, delivered a most moving oration, and Lloyd George who was present threw into the grave Britain's floral tribute.

Amongst the significant events which occurred in January, the dissolution of the General Confederation of Labour (C.G.T.) is not the least important. The breaking-up of this organization was promulgated on the 13th by the Tribunal Correctionnel following on the revolutionary strikes which had occurred in April and May 1920. The majority of the nation approved of this course. Many workmen themselves had protested against certain strike-orders, given by their leaders, as was alleged, for merely political or revolutionary purposes; and no doubt the C.G.T. had lost the support of public opinion.

Before the close of January there was a distinct improvement in the value of the franc, which dropped from sixty to fifty-two for the pound sterling.

During the whole of February French opinion watched the attitude of Germany with no little expectancy.

On the 1st Millerand expressed his most ardent congratulations to Briand and his colleagues on the part they had taken in the Paris conference. The results of the conference were placed before the Chamber by Briand on 3 February, and after discussing the question for seven days, the House expressed its confidence in the cabinet by 387 votes out of 522.

On 19 February, three more generals were promoted "marshals of France", viz., General Émile Fayolle, General Louis Franchet d'Esperey, and General Hubert Lyautey. These, together with Marshal Joseph Joffre, Marshal Ferdinand Foch, and Marshal Philippe Pétain, raised the number of French marshals to six.

During February Marshal Józef Piłsudski, the head of the Polish state, paid a visit to France in the interests of Franco-Polish amity.

Franco-British friendship was also deepened as a result of Lloyd George's reply to the German delegation at the London conference. Indeed, never since the armistice had the Entente Cordiale been so greatly appreciated in France. The results of the conference were approved by the Chamber on 17 March, after a two days' debate, by 490 votes out of 559. French troops joined British and Belgian battalions in the further occupation of German territory. The Chamber had already authorized the minister of war, on 4 March, to incorporate the conscripts born in 1901.

The government also cultivated Franco-American relations. On 19 March René Viviani, a former prime minister, was sent to the United States, where he was received in special audience by President Warren G. Harding.

Meanwhile, questions of finance were before both houses of Parliament. Early in April the Senate discussed expenditure on foreign affairs, finally agreeing to the proposals of the government. The Senate also agreed to the government's request for 120 million francs for the continuance of French propaganda in Syria. The budget of 1921 was finally discussed by the Senate on 16 April. One of the provisions of the Finance Law limited the number of ministries in future to twelve, and of under-secretaries of state to four.

On 12 April, by a unanimous vote of the Chamber, the dignity of Marshal of France was granted to the late General Joseph Gallieni, who defended Paris in 1914.

An event of national importance of a much earlier date was commemorated by Joan of Arc's day (8 May) instituted as a national holiday by the law of July 1920. On 16 April Marraud, minister of the interior, sent to the prefects a circular regarding this celebration, requesting them to take the necessary steps in order to solemnize the day with great display. He pointed out that the memory of Jeanne d'Arc should not be the exclusive possession of any one religious body, but should be the common property of the whole nation. These sentiments, echoed by a cabinet minister, reflected the government's changed attitude towards the Catholic Church which culminated in the endeavour to reestablish diplomatic relations with the Vatican.

As regards the inter-Allied decisions, the Senate on 21 April ratified the laying of a 50% tax on German imports as decided at the last London conference. In the following week Briand started for London to attend the inter-Allied conference. From London, on 2 May, he instructed the war minister by telephone to call back the 1919 class to the colours, in view of the possible decision of the Allies to occupy the Ruhr district, in accordance with the scheme drawn up by Marshal Foch. But as on 10 May Germany acceded to the Allied terms, this possibility did not arise. Nevertheless, the 1919 class were not liberated until 21 June.

It is worthy of note that May Day passed off in France without any popular manifestations. All the more remarkable were the other celebrations during May. On the 4th and 5th France recalled the hundredth anniversary of the death of Napoleon; on the 8th Jeanne d'Arc's day was fitly observed; while on the 15th an important meeting of athletic societies was held at Lille which Millerand attended, thus giving his high approval to the general tendency towards the encouragement of sport in France.

The London conference was followed by a debate in Parliament on the government's foreign policy. For six days, from 19 to 25 May, the government was subjected to attacks, which the prime minister met successfully, carrying with him the Chamber, which gave him a vote of confidence of 390 votes out of 552.

On 27 May, the Chamber passed a resolution authorizing the free import of wheat, and on 7 June the peace treaty with Hungary was ratified.

During the last days of June parliamentary circles were somewhat excited by the bankruptcy of the "Banque Industrielle de Chine", and the government was once again strongly attacked by several deputies on account of its supposed relations with the bank.

On 1 July, the Journal Officiel published the result of the census taken in March, according to which the total population was found to be 37,499,300, as against over 38,000,000 in 1911. The drop was chiefly due to the loss of 1,500,000 men in the war.

Owing to a heatwave at the beginning of July, the government decided not to hold the annual review of troops which was due to take place on the race-course of Longchamp, near Paris, on the morning of the National Day, 14 July. But as usual the French government received on that day the congratulations of foreign governments. The United States happily timed for 14 July the arrival in Paris of their new ambassador, Myron T. Herrick, a well-known Francophile. Briand met Herrick at the Gare Saint-Lazare, and he was given a good reception all along his route. General indignation was expressed at an attempt to assassinate him on 19 October at the American embassy.

The end of July was marked by a great maritime display at Le Havre, attended by Millerand as well as the minister of marine. This had been set up by the "Maritime and Colonial League" to help the recovery of the French navy and merchant fleet. A further step in the same direction was the creation in October of an Academy of Shipping constituted by leading personalities of the shipping world for the revival of the shipping trade and the improvement of freight conditions.

On 6 August Mgr. Bonaventure Ceretti handed to Millerand, at the Château de Rambouillet, his credentials as legate from the pope to the government of the French Republic. "This reception", said the legate, "which in other times would have been merely a happy incident of no great consequence, today constitutes an event of historic importance, and it is especially to you and to your distinguished predecessor that should be attributed the merit of having prepared the way for its realization." Without waiting for the formal approval of Parliament, Briand sent Auguste Jonnart as extraordinary ambassador to the Vatican. This action was brought up in the Senate on 8 December, and led to a fierce debate, the question being treated by the government as one of confidence. The Left, with Gaston Doumergue as its chief spokesman, strongly opposed the government, stating the dangers to which the "laicality" of the republic would be exposed by the appointment of a French ambassador to the Vatican. Doumergue was successfully opposed by some Alsatian senators who said that this standpoint had been abandoned during the war. In the end the Senate on 15 December passed a vote of confidence in the government, approving of the revival of diplomatic relations between France and the Vatican.

A few days after the arrival of Mgr. Ceretti, France welcomed members of the American Legion who had crossed the Atlantic to pay a visit to the battlefields. On 11 September celebrations were held at Meaux to mark the seventh anniversary of the victory of the Marne. Barthou, the minister of war, attended the ceremony together with Marshal Joffre and General Maunoury.

Meanwhile, a general strike had broken out in the north of France, in support of a strike of textile workers owing to a threat to reduce wages. The dispute was finally settled by the intervention of the government.

On 2 October Georges Clemenceau, the "Tiger", who had just returned from his tiger shooting in India, reentered the political arena for the first time since his resignation, by delivering a speech at Sainte-Hermines in La Vendée on the occasion of the unveiling of his own monument. Replying to the many reproaches levelled at him since his return to private life, he said that it was his successors who had not upheld the rights of France under the Treaty of Versailles. "Yesterday", he declared, "we were victorious. May we not be put today in such a position that we shall wonder whether we are still victorious!" These words referred to the charge brought against Clemenceau of having sacrificed the rights of France to what is called "the policy of alliances". The conflict of these two principles has placed all the French premiers since the armistice on the horns of a dilemma. They have had to choose repeatedly between insisting on the rights of France in their integrity, especially the claim to reparation in full from Germany, and consenting to concessions required by their allies. If they lean to the former alternative, they have to face a protest from the Left; if to the latter, they incur the censure of the Right and Centre. Briand in this respect has fared no better than his predecessors. On 9 October he delivered a speech at St. Nazaire which contained an eloquent statement of the results of the war and the aspirations of France, but gave no clear indication of the way to obtain the realization of these aspirations. The tone of the press showed that the country was somewhat disappointed.

Parliament reopened on 18 October, and then began a keen fight against the government, carried on by the Right and Centre parties reinforced by the old followers of Clemenceau. Eighteen deputies had sent in notice of interpellation on the government's policy. Léon Daudet, the Royalist deputy, led the attack, criticizing the government for having given up the customs-line of the Rhine which constituted the most important security for the payment of Germany's war debt. Maurice Barrès levelled the same reproach at Briand. He insisted that France should have a "Rhine policy", and his speech met with the approval of the majority of the Chamber. On the 25th André Tardieu, one of the negotiators of the Treaty of Versailles, in continuing the debate severely indicted the Left party, the "Bloc des gauches", the leading party before the war, which is now endeavouring to regain its lost supremacy from the "Bloc National", constituted by the last elections of 1919. Édouard Herriot, the mayor of Lyon, one of the most prominent members of the "Bloc des gauches", vigorously refuted the charges of Tardieu. On 26 October the Chamber finally passed a vote of confidence in the government by 339 votes out of 517.

Early in October, the minister of justice issued instructions to all the presidents of tribunals of France that the seconds of a duel should be prosecuted as accomplices in the offense, thus making the legislation in regard to duelling much more stringent. In the course of the same month Marraud, minister of the interior, gave notice of the introduction of a bill for the greater decentralization of the administration of France.

France having decided to take part in the Washington conference, the opening of which had been fixed for 12 November, Marshal Foch sailed for the United States on 22 October on board the new liner Paris, the largest French vessel afloat, which had been put into service by the Compagnie Générale Transatlantique on 15 June on the Havre-New York line; and on 29 October, Briand left France for Washington, accompanied by Albert Sarraut, minister for the colonies, René Viviani, ex-prime minister, Philippe Berthelot, general secretary at the Ministry of Foreign Affairs, and the other members of the delegation.

On the 21st, Briand delivered a sensational speech at Washington, in which he exposed the German danger. The delegates of the Allied countries approved of this statement, but the questions of naval disarmament and the Japanese alliance monopolized the attention of the conference to the exclusion of the vital questions of reparations and disarmament of Germany. As was expected, Briand had to face severe criticism when on 8 December he made a statement on the Washington conference before the Senate.

During the absence of the premier, Millerand attended at Montpellier, together with four ministers, the celebration of the seventh centenary of the Faculty of Medicine, which took place on 6 November.

A few days later, a great debate on the budget took place in the Chamber. Paul Doumer, minister for finance, announced a serious deficit. Several deputies took occasion to criticize the defective yield of the income tax. An ex-minister, Louis Deschamps, made an attack on the government monopolies, alleging that the state was a bad trader - an opinion general in France. The discussion of the budget lasted until 15 December, when the Chamber, in a night sitting, finally voted the whole of the credits asked for by the government. A few days later, on the 24th, the question of the bankruptcy of the Banque Industrielle de Chine, which had happened in the last days of June, was brought up again in the Chamber. The government met successfully a strong attack on its attitude towards this bank, but, as a consequence of this attack, Philippe Berthelot, general secretary at the Ministry of Foreign Affairs, whose brother was the chairman of the bank, retired from office. On the 27th, after a long debate, the Chamber expressed its confidence in the government by 391 votes out of 604.

The year 1921 was one of slow recovery for France. The output of mines and factories has been notably increased, but the trading conditions are still unsatisfactory. It is believed in many quarters that the law instituting the eight-hour day is one of the chief reasons for the slowness in the revival of industry, and there is little doubt that the efforts which are being made by a few Socialists to extend this regulation to agriculture will be checked by Parliament. As regards the financial situation, it is noticeable that the government have decided not to issue any new loans, as these have the disadvantage of drawing private capital away from industry. The government hope to do more for reestablishing the public finances by encouraging the recovery of trade. But despite all this many Frenchmen believe that France needs reparations in order to restore her ruins, and that her revival depends on the payment of the German war debt. In the last days of 1921 the country was looking towards Cannes, where a new inter-Allied conference was due to take place.

== Timeline ==
- 16 January – Aristide Briand forms a new Cabinet.
- 19 February – Defensive alliance between France and the Second Polish Republic.
- 8 March – Allied forces occupy Düsseldorf, Ruhrort and Duisburg.
- 9 March – Cilicia Peace Treaty signed between France and the Turkish National Movement in an attempt to end the Franco-Turkish War.
- 5 May – Chanel No. 5 perfume is launched by Coco Chanel in Paris.
- 27 May – Introduction of a highway code.
- 15 June – Compagnie Générale Transatlantique's liner SS Paris (1916) makes her maiden voyage from Le Havre to New York.
- 25 June – Train derailment at Beaumont-Hamel kills 25.
- 1 July – The first BCG vaccination against tuberculosis is given, in Paris; the recipient is a newborn child.
- 22 July – Introduction of a mobile force of gendarmerie.
- 10 September – Train derailment at Les Échets kills 38.
- 5 October – Train collision in the Batignolles Tunnel, Paris, kills at least 28 in a fire.
- 20 October – Treaty of Ankara signed between France and the Government of the Grand National Assembly of Turkey, ending the Franco-Turkish War.
- 7–30 November – Trial and conviction of serial killer Henri Désiré Landru at Versailles.
- 13 December – In the Four-Power Treaty on Insular Possessions, Japan, the United States, United Kingdom and France agree to recognize the status quo in the Pacific.
- 24 December – First public radio broadcast from the Eiffel Tower in Paris.
- First vintage of Dom Pérignon.

== Arts and literature ==
- 13 May – 'Trial' and 'sentencing' of Maurice Barrès by Dada.
- 6 June
  - The première of Tristan Tzara's parodic The Gas Heart (Le Cœur à gaz) takes place at a Dada Salon at the Galerie Montaigne in Paris; provoking audience derision.
  - Stage première in Paris by the Ballets suédois of Milhaud's L'Homme et son désir.
- Fernand Léger paints Man and Woman and Still Life with a Beer Mug.

== Sport ==
- 26 June – Tour de France begins.
- 24 July – Tour de France won by Leon Scieur of Belgium.

== Births ==
=== January to March ===
- 3 January
  - Jean-Louis Koszul, mathematician (died 2018)
  - Claude Vigée, poet (died 2020)
- 13 January – Pierre Franey, chef and food writer (died 1996)
- 15 January
  - Colette Caillat, professor of Sanskrit and comparative grammar (died 2007)
  - Claude Piel, aircraft designer (died 1982)
- 26 January – Eddie Barclay, music producer (died 2005)
- 29 January – Louise Moreau, politician (died 2001)
- 9 February – Yves Ciampi, film director (died 1982)
- 12 February – Janine Niépce, photographer (died 2007)
- 13 February
  - Jeanne Demessieux, organist, pianist, composer and teacher (died 1968)
  - Louis Féraud, fashion designer and artist (died 1999)
- 22 February – Jean Duvignaud, novelist and sociologist (died 2007)
- 28 February – Pierre Clostermann, flying ace, author, engineer and politician (died 2006)
- 3 March – Paul Guimard, writer (died 2004)
- 5 March – Charlez ar Gall, Breton-language broadcaster (died 2010)
- 25 March – Simone Signoret, actress (died 1985)
- 29 March – Jacqueline Joubert, television presenter (died 2005)

=== April to June ===
- 9 April – Jean-Marie Balestre, sports executive (died 2008)
- 18 April – Jean Richard, actor (died 2001)
- 20 April – Janine Sutto, actress (died 2017 in Canada)
- 26 April – François Picard, motor racing driver (died 1996)
- 7 May – Gaston Rébuffat, alpinist and mountain guide (died 1985)
- 19 May – Daniel Gélin, actor, director and screenwriter (died 2002)
- 5 June – Gérard de Sède, author (died 2004)
- 7 June – Alexandre de Marenches, military officer (died 1995)
- 10 June – Jean Robic, road racing cyclist, won 1947 Tour de France (died 1980)
- 21 June – Jean de Broglie, politician, assassinated (died 1976)
- 26 June – Violette Szabo, World War II Allied secret agent (died 1945)
- 29 June – Frédéric Dard, writer (died 2000)

=== July to September ===
- 4 July – Gérard Debreu, economist and mathematician, won 1983 Nobel Memorial Prize in Economics (died 2004)
- 11 July – Claude Bonin-Pissarro, painter and graphic designer (died 2021)
- 16 July – Guy Laroche, fashion designer (died 1989)
- 23 July – Alan Heusaff, Breton nationalist and linguist (died 1999)
- 25 July – Lionel Terray, climber (died 1965)
- 4 August – Jean Pierre Capron, painter (died 1997)
- 13 August – Louis Frémaux, conductor (died 2017)
- 28 August – Jean-Philippe Charbonnier, photographer (died 2004)
- 9 September – Paul Arnaud de Foïard, general (died 2005)
- 11 September – Michel Jobert, politician (died 2002)
- 17 September – Gisèle Pascal, actress (died 2007)
- 19 September – André Chandernagor, politician (died 2025)
- 27 September – Jean-Pierre Sudre, photographer (died 1997)

=== October to December ===
- 9 October – Michel Boisrond, film director and writer (died 2002)
- 13 October – Yves Montand, actor and singer (died 1991)
- 16 October – Georges Wilson, screen actor (died 2010)
- 20 October – René Paul Raymond Capuron, botanist (died 1971)
- 22 October – Georges Brassens, singer and songwriter (died 1981)
- 23 October – Denise Duval, soprano (died 2016)
- 14 November – Pierre Crousillac, general (died 2011)
- 19 November – Michel Bonnevie, Olympic basketball player (died 2018)
- 26 November – Françoise Gilot, painter (died 2023)
- 5 December – Louis de Froment, conductor (died 1994)
- 15 December – Jacques Lecoq, actor, mime and acting instructor (died 1999)

== Deaths ==
- 3 March – Auguste Mercier, politician and soldier (born 1833)
- 13 May – Joachim Gasquet, poet, and art critic (born 1873)
- 13 May – Jean Aicard, poet, dramatist and novelist (born 1848)
- 4 June – Jean Baptiste Aimable Gaillot, astronomer (born 1834)
- 5 June – Georges Feydeau, farceur (born 1862)
- 30 June – Jules Carpentier, engineer and inventor (born 1851)
- 16 July – Louis de Maud'huy, military leader (born 1857)
- 20 July – Henri-Étienne Beaunis, physiologist and psychologist (born 1830)
- 19 August – Georges Darien, writer (born 1862)
- 21 August – Ernest Daudet, journalist, novelist and historian (born 1837)
- 13 September – Alfred Grandidier, naturalist and explorer (born 1836)
- 22 September – Auguste-René-Marie Dubourg, Archbishop of Rennes and Cardinal (born 1842)
- 26 November – Émile Cartailhac, historian and archaeologist (born 1845)
- 30 November – Madeleine Brès, physician (born 1842)
- 16 December – Camille Saint-Saëns, composer, organist, conductor (born 1835)

== See also ==
- Interwar France
- List of French films of 1921

== Source ==
- Epstein M. ed. The Annual Register... 1921 (London, 1922) online pp 157ff.
