= Pierre Garat =

Pierre Garat may refer to:

- Pierre-Jean Garat (1764–1823), French singer
- Pierre Garat (civil servant) (1919–1976), civil servant of Vichy France
