= 1920 in rail transport =

This article lists events related to rail transport that occurred in 1920.

== Events ==
=== January events ===
- January 28 – Groundbreaking commences to begin construction of the Cincinnati Subway.

=== February events ===
- February 23–March 4, May 4–29 - 1920 French railway strikes.

=== March events ===
- March 1 – Control of American railroads is returned to private ownership and administration with the disbandment of the USRA.
- March 18 – Fruit Growers Express (FGE) is incorporated in the United States.

=== April events ===
- April 1 – Deutsche Reichseisenbahnen merges the German state railways.

=== May events ===
- May 15 – The Ministry of Railways of Japan is established.

=== June events ===
- June 13 – Baltimore and Ohio Railroad inaugurates passenger service to Detroit's Fort Street Union Depot as the first passenger train departs for Washington, DC.

=== July events ===
- July 5 – Portland–Lewiston Interurban carries its heaviest passenger load with trains to the Maine Statehood Centennial Exposition.

=== October events ===
- October 1 – Palestine Railways established to manage lines within British Mandatory Palestine, including the Jezreel Valley railway.

=== November events ===
- November – H. P. M. Beames succeeds Charles Bowen-Cooke as Chief Mechanical Engineer of the London and North Western Railway.
- November 20 – Work begins on the State Railway of Thailand to convert all 1,435 mm (4 ft 8 1/2 in) track to meter gauge.

=== December events ===
- December 23 – The Kirkenes–Bjørnevatn Line in Norway takes electric traction into use.

=== Unknown date events ===
- William Sproule succeeds Julius Kruttschnitt as president of the Southern Pacific Company, parent company of the Southern Pacific Railroad. This is Sproule's second term as president.
- Government of India accepts recommendation of Sir William Acworth's East India Railway Committee that the government should take over management of the country's railways.
- Partition of the Ottoman Empire leads to abandonment of the Hejaz railway.

== Births ==
=== April births ===
- April 16 – Alan Pegler, British railway preservationist (died 2012).
- April 17 – James B. McCahey, Jr., president of Chicago South Shore and South Bend Railroad (died 1998).

== Deaths ==
=== July deaths ===
- July 22 – William Kissam Vanderbilt, heir to Cornelius Vanderbilt and president of the New York Central system (born 1849).

=== October deaths ===
- October 18 – Charles Bowen-Cooke, Chief Mechanical Engineer of the London and North Western Railway 1909–1920 (born 1859).

=== November deaths ===
- November 17 – T. Jefferson Coolidge, president of Atchison, Topeka and Santa Fe Railway 1880–1881 (born 1831).

=== December deaths ===
- December 1 – Edward Ponsonby, 8th Earl of Bessborough, director of London, Brighton and South Coast Railway from 1895 and chairman of same from 1908 (born 1851).

== See also ==
- List of rail accidents (1920–1929)
