= Serge Lang (skiing) =

French alpine skier

- Serge Lang, founder of the alpine skiing World Cup
- Born: 6 June 1920; Mulhouse, France
- Died: 21 November 1999 (aged 79); Sternenberg, Haut-Rhin, France
- Occupation: Journalist
- Writing career
- Subjects: Alpine skiing, cycling

Serge Lang (6 June 1920 – 21 November 1999) was a French journalist, alpine skier and the founder of the alpine skiing World Cup. As a journalist he covered alpine skiing, cycling, and other sports for five major publications. In the mid-1960s, he envisioned a season-long series of ski races, which became the World Cup skiing circuit. He continued to guide the growth of the World Cup and the sport of ski racing over the next two decades.

== Biography ==
=== Early years ===
Jean-Jacques "Serge" Lang was born in June 1920 in Mulhouse, Alsace, in eastern France. He moved with his parents to Switzerland in 1921, where his father Albert became director of the French train station located in Basel. Lang learned to ski before the age of 7 in Markstein, in the Vosges Mountains with his father Albert and his mother, Friedl. He competed in ski races during his youth.

During World War II, he remained in Switzerland and worked as a journalist in Basel, where he also founded a film festival named "le Bon Film" with his friend Peter Baechlin. After the war he covered the Nuremberg Trials in 1946 and, along with Ernst von Schenck, provided analytical commentary for the memoirs of Alfred Rosenberg, Nazi Germany's chief racial theoretician, who was executed in October of that year. As a correspondent for the leading French evening paper Le Soir, Lang also attended a variety of sporting events after reporting on the 1948 Winter Olympics at St. Moritz, especially alpine skiing and cycling.

=== The birth of the World Cup ===
In the mid-1960s, he had the idea for a season-long series of ski races with a points system to determine a champion after being requested by former Tour de France and sportspaper L'Équipe director Jacques Goddet to "invent somethings which would help our readers to better understand ski racing alpine circuit". A few months earlier, Lang had attended the very successful 'Nations Team Event' at Vail, Colorado, where the three best teams of the 1964 Olympics at Innsbruck had been invited by former US Alpine Director Bob Beattie to enter a newly launched team competition. It was such an exciting event that Serge Lang was convinced afterwards it was time to greatly enlarge the horizon of alpine ski racing mostly limited to central Europe during the winter season. In December 1965, L'Équipe launched the first (unofficial) European ski circuit named "Trophée de L'Equipe", which was won by France's Marielle Goitschel and Austria's Karl Schranz. Lang, after discussing it with some of his friends Bob Beattie, the US Alpine Director, and Honoré Bonnet, Head Coach of the French Ski Team, during a downhill training session of the famous "Hahnenkamm" races at Kitzbühel, Austria, in January 1966, decided that it should become a world tour. He choose to name it the "World Cup" after the football (soccer) world championships held in England in 1966, which were the first to be called World Cup.

That same summer, the ski World Championships were held in August for the first time in Portillo, Chile, during the Southern Hemisphere winter. This provided an opportunity for all the major figures in ski racing to come together including as Bob Beattie, Alpine Director of the United States Ski Team, and Honoré Bonnet, head of the French Alpine Ski Team, as well as Dr. Sepp Sulzberger from Austria, and hash out the details of the proposed competition with a few skiers such as Frenchmen Jean-Claude Killy and Guy Périllat or Austrian Karl Schranz. The President of the International Ski Federation (FIS), Marc Hodler from Switzerland, agreed to support the new event which he personally presented to the press in Chile.

The first (still unofficial) World Cup season began next winter with the men's competitions at Berchtesgaden, Germany, on 5 January 1967. The first overall winners at the end of that season were Nancy Greene of Canada, and France's Jean-Claude Killy. The World Cup became an official event sanctioned by FIS next spring during its Congress at Beirut, Lebanon. Marc Hodler became the first president of the World Cup Committee until 1973.

=== Later years ===
The alpine skiing World Cup soon became a huge success with ski racing fans, racers, organizers and ski suppliers. Lang continued to guide its growth over the following decades, serving as president of the International Ski Federation's Alpine World Cup committee from 1973 to 1986. He also continued working as a sports journalist for Blick, La Suisse, 24 Heures, and L'Équipe, and founded the Association of International Ski Journalists in 1961. Lang wrote several books about ski racing and the World Cup, including the annual Ski World Cup Guide (popularly known as the "Biorama") with World Cup statistics and racer biographies, and the retrospective 21 Years of World Cup Ski Racing published in 1986. Lang lived his later years in Riehen, Switzerland, and apparently died of a heart attack in Sternenberg, Haut-Rhin, France while writing his memoirs in November 1999. His son, Patrick, is also a journalist covering alpine ski racing. The Lang legacy continues with two of his grand children, Manuèle (born 1974) and Philippe-Alexandre (born 1978) also working on the World Cup tour and cycling as reporters and cameraman. In 1991 three generations of the family worked at the Tour de France, certainly a unique performance: both Patrick Lang and his then 16-year-old daughter worked for ABC Sports while Serge Lang covered the race for some of his usual newspapers.

=== Wife ===
Serge Lang was married from 1944 to 1989 to German-born journalist Anneliese Lang, who strongly supported him at the beginning of his career. Anneliese Lang was a film critic and met Lang at Basel during the War while reporting on "Le Bon Film" festival for a German newspaper. After returning to Berlin, she fled Germany after finding out she was wanted by the Gestapo. She returned to Basel after jumping from her train while approaching the station. She died from cancer in 1989.

== Books by Serge Lang ==
- Lang, Serge (1967) Le ski: et autres sports d'hiver Larousse OCLC 15183297
- Lang, Serge; Baumann, Erich & Dieter; Stellwaag, Jochen (1980) Le grand livre du Tour de France Paris: Calmann-Lévy ISBN 9782702103647
- Lang, Serge (1986). 21 Years of World Cup Ski Racing. Johnson Books / James Wotton. ISBN 1-55566-009-6. Also available under ISBN 0-246-13116-0.
