= Jean Maran =

Martiniquais politician (1920–2021)

Jean Maran (8 May 1920 – 9 May 2021) was a politician from Martinique who served in the French National Assembly from 1986 to 1988. He was mayor of the city of Sainte-Luce from 21 March 1965 to 1 July 1990, general councilor from 1964 to 1994, regional councilor from 1983 to 1985, and deputy for Martinique from 16 March 1986 to 14 May 1988, at the end of the legislature. He was also president of the urban community SIVOM SUD and of the association of mayors of Martinique from 1977 to 1990. He was born in Riviere-Pilote, Martinique. He died at age 101 on 9 May 2021 in Fort-de-France.
