= Paul Rambié =

French painter (1919–2020)

- Born: 24 May 1919; Boucau, France
- Died: 27 October 2020 (aged 101); Paris, France
- Occupation: Painter

Paul Rambié (24 May 1919 – 27 October 2020) was a French painter.

== Biography ==
In his youth, Rambié was drawn by a passion for painting. This passion was interrupted by World War II. In 1939, he served in the Mediterranean and Middle East theatre of World War II in Syria and Lebanon. From 1942 to 1945, he was deported to Nazi Germany during the Service du travail obligatoire. After the war, he entered the École des beaux-arts de Bayonne, which was newly created by Louis-Frédéric Dupuis. While at the school, he became friends with Roland Bierge, who, like him, was born in Boucau.

Rambié's first exhibition took place in Paris in 1955. He was notices by Maurice Gieure, who published a collection featuring Rambié and brought him his first buyers. Shortly thereafter, his works began being exhibited in the United States and Spain. Along with the Spanish painter Marixa, he founded the group Le Grenier d'Ustaritz in 1960. From 1966 to 1971, he taught at the Centre socio-culturel de Cambo-les-Bains. He moved to Paris in 1976 and began regular exhibitions at the Galerie Serge Garnier, the Salon des Indépendants, the Salon d'Automne, the Salon Comparaisons, and the Salon des 109, where he joined his friend, Roland Bierge. The international recognition of his work caused Rambié to visit the United States, Spain, Italy, Greece, Israel, and Peru. He visited places such as the Museo del Prado and Machu Picchu. According to Guy Vignoht, he was "dematerialized by asceticism".

Paul Rambié died in Paris on 27 October 2020 at the age of 101.

== Exhibitions ==
- Galeries Denise Riquelme, Paris and Biarritz (1959)
- Paul Rambié - Esprit de Lumières at the Galerie Georges-Pompidou, Anglet (December 2015 – January 2016)
