= Geneviève Asse =

French painter (1923–2021)

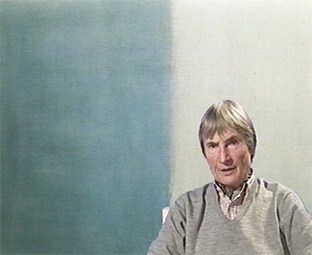
Asse in 1995

Geneviève Asse (Vannes, France, 24 January 1923 – 11 August 2021) was a French painter. She died in August 2021 at the age of 98. She was awarded the Grand-Cross of the National Order of the Legion of Honour.

Geneviève Asse is one of the most notable abstract French painters of the post-war era. The characteristic shade of blue she created had been called "le bleu Asse".

== Collections ==
- Musée des Beaux-Arts de Tours, Horizons, oil on canvas
- Musée des Beaux-Arts de Quimper, Vertical Collage I, oil on canvas
- Musée d'Arts de Nantes
- Musée d'art moderne de la ville de Paris
- Musée National d'Art Moderne Centre Pompidou
- Menil Collection, Houston

== Bibliography ==
- Christian Briend, Isabelle Ewig, Silvia Baron-Supervielle, Camille Morando, Geneviève Asse : Peintures, Paris, Somogy, 2013 ISBN 978-2-7572-0668-3
- Élisabeth Védrenne et Valérie de Maulmin, Les Pionnières : dans les ateliers des femmes artistes du 20eme siecle, photographies de Catherine Panchout, Paris, Somogy éditions d'art, 2018 ISBN 978-2-7572-1305-6
