= Denise Glaser =

French television presenter (1920–1983)

- Born: 30 November 1920; Arras, France
- Died: 6 June 1983 (aged 62); 15th arrondissement of Paris, France
- Occupation: Television presenter
- Known for: Discorama

Denise Glaser (30 November 1920 – 6 June 1983) was a French television producer and presenter, best known for presenting the musical show Discorama, from 1959 to 1975.

== Homage ==
There is a Denise-Glaser street in Valenciennes in the town, where she is buried. The decision was approved in October 2014.
