= Maurice Paul (footballer) =

German footballer

Personal information
- Full name: Maurice Paul
- Date of birth: 3 February 1992 (age 34)
- Place of birth: Hanau, Germany
- Height: 1.88 m (6 ft 2 in)
- Position: Goalkeeper

Youth career
- SpVgg Dietesheim
- –2009: Eintracht Frankfurt

Senior career*
Years	Team	Apps	(Gls)
2009–2012	Kickers Offenbach II	49	(0)
2011–2012	Kickers Offenbach	1	(0)
2012–2013	Germania Halberstadt II	3	(0)
2012–2013	Germania Halberstadt	5	(0)
2014	TuS Koblenz	0	(0)
2014–2017	Hessen Dreieich	26	(0)
- * Club domestic league appearances and goals as of 23:15, 28 September 2017 (UTC)

Maurice Paul (born 3 February 1992) is a German footballer who plays as a goalkeeper.
