= Simone Chrisostome =

French resistant (1923–2021)

- Born: 10 December 1923; Hendaye, France
- Died: 1 January 2021 (aged 97)
- Occupation: Resistant

Simone Chrisostome (10 December 1923 – 1 January 2021) was a French Resistance member. She fought for the organization and survived the German concentration camps Ravensbrück and Fünfeichen.
