= Roland Weyl =

French militant and lawyer (1919–2021)

- Born: 18 March 1919; Paris, France
- Died: 20 April 2021 (aged 102)
- Occupations: Militant; Lawyer
- Known for: French Resistance during World War II in France / legal work

Roland Weyl (18 March 1919 – 20 April 2021) was a French Resistance militant and lawyer. He joined the Paris Bar in 1939, but was banned due to the German Occupation. He became Dean of the Paris Bar Association in 2010.

== Biography ==
Weyl's father, André, was also a lawyer. Roland himself officially became a lawyer on 12 July 1939, and became a doctor of law in 1942. During that time, he took part in the French Resistance.

After World War II, Weyl dedicated his legal career to defending political activists, trade unionists, and anti-colonialists. He served as vice-president of the International Association of Democratic Lawyers, which he joined during its founding in 1946. That same year, he joined the French Communist Party. He was Editor-in-Chief of Revue de droit contemporain from 1954 to 1991 and served on the editorial board of La Nouvelle Critique. He also served on the national council of the Mouvement de la Paix.

Weyl became Dean of the Paris Bar Association in February 2010, succeeding Alain Crosson du Cormier. He celebrated his 100th birthday in March 2019 and received homage from the Paris Bar.

Roland Weyl died on 20 April 2021 at the age of 102.

== Books ==
- La justice et les Hommes (1961)
- La part du droit dans la réalité et dans l'action (1968)
- Révolution et perspectives du droit : de la société de classes à la société sans classes (1974)
- Divorce, libéralisme ou liberté (1975)
- Une robe pour un combat : souvenirs et réflexions d'un avocat engagé (1989)
- Démo-cratie, pouvoir du Peuple (1996)
- Se libérer de Maastricht pour une Europe des peuples (1999)
- Nous, peuples des Nations unies : sortir le droit international du placard (2008)
- Droit, pouvoir et citoyenneté (2017)
