= 1920 French railway strikes =

Labour dispute in France

The 1920 French railway strikes included two major strike waves led by railworkers and involving many sectors of the French economy.

As a part of the broader 1919—1920 French strike wave which saw significant discontent with the political establishment following working class soldiers' return from World War I, the railway strikes began on 23 February 1920. The first strike wave saw moderate success and ended on 4 March.

The second wave began on 3 May. A total of 93,000 railworkers participated in the strike and an additional 380,000 workers from other sectors organized solidarity strikes in the following weeks. The strike was forcibly ended on 29 May when strike leaders were arrested and the railworkers were ordered to return to work or be drafted into the French military.

== Background ==
Following the end of World War I, soldiers returned to work in the French economy. Many working-class people felt betrayed by corruption among French politicians and reformist labour leaders. This discontent resulted in a wave of strikes between 1919 and 1920, which saw the participation of millions of French workers and the formation of the French Communist Party.

== Strikes ==
Cumulatively, the railway strikes were a focal point of the 1919—1920 French strike wave.

=== First wave ===
The first wave included several moderately successful railway strikes across France between 23 February 1920 and 4 March. The largest among these strikes involved a walkout of 26,000 railworkers in Paris, attracting national attention. The railway strikes motivated 333 additional walkouts in other sectors during February and 452 in March, held in solidarity with the striking railworkers.

=== Second wave ===
Following the success of the February strikes, rank-and-file railworkers felt their employers were not respecting their new agreements. In April, the congress of railway workers met to discuss the prospect of a second strike, which they wanted to call on 1 May. Ultimately, another railway strike began on 3 May and lasted until the 29th. A total of 93,000 workers participated in the strike.

On 28 April, Léon Jouhaux promised that the French General Confederation of Labour (CGT) would organize strikes in additional sectors of the French economy in solidarity with the striking railworkers. From 1 to 3 May, the CGT organized strikes including miners, seamen and dock workers. The following week, metalworkers, construction workers, aircraft builders and all port and dock workers who had not participated in the earlier action struck on 10 May. The following day, furniture and gas workers went on strike in solidarity with the railworkers, bringing the total number of strikers outside of the rail industry to 380,000. Additional workers would opt to go on strike on their own initiative in the following weeks.

== Outcome ==
The second wave failed due to a government crackdown on the striking railworkers. All 93,000 strikers returned to work after their leaders were arrested and the workers were threatened with being drafted into the army. In the end, 18,000 railworkers were fired for their involvement in the strike.

== See also ==
- 1920 in France
