= Georges Bonnet (writer) =

French writer (1919–2021)

- Born: 9 June 1919; Pons, France
- Died: 22 February 2021 (aged 101)
- Occupation: Writer

Georges Bonnet (9 June 1919 – 22 February 2021) was a French writer and poet.

== Biography ==
Born in 1919 in Pons, Bonnet worked as a physical education teacher and did not publish his first book until the age of 45 and his second at the age of 64. He lived in Poitiers during his writing career, where he published his most successful novel, Les yeux des chiens ont toujours soif. He published his final book at the age of 97, Juste avant la nuit.

A road in Poitiers was named after him. Georges Bonnet died in 2021, at the age of 101.

== Works ==
- La tête en ses jardins (1965)
- Le veilleur de javelles (1983)
- Aux mamelles du silence (1986)
- Une mort légère (1988)
- Les belles rondeurs de l'évidence (1989)
- Ce qui toujours s'approche (1991)
- De quoi en faire un monde (1992)
- Dans une autre saison (1993)
- Patience des jours (1994)
- Tout bien pesé (1996)
- Entre temps (1997)
- Remontée vers le jour (1999)
- Un si bel été (2000)
- Coquerets et coquerelles (2003)
- Un seul moment (2004)
- Un bref moment de bonheur (2004)
- Lointains (2005)
- Un ciel à hauteur d'homme (2006)
- Les yeux des chiens ont toujours soif (2006)
- Un jour nous partirons (2008)
- Chaque regard est un adieu (2010)
- Entre deux mots la nuit (2012)
- La claudication des jours (2013)
- Derrière un rideau d'ombres (2014)
- Juste avant la nuit (2016)
