= Pierre Crousillac =

French Army general (1921–2011)

Pierre Crousillac
- Born: 14 November 1921; Brive-la-Gaillarde, France
- Died: 17 December 2011 (aged 90); Turenne, France
- Burial place: Objat
- Military career
- Allegiance: France
- Branch: French Army
- Service years: 1946–1981
- Rank: Général de corps d'armée
- Nickname: "Coplan" (operational call sign)
- Commands: 11th Shock Parachute Battalion; 8th Infantry Division; French military mission to the NATO Military Committee
- Conflicts: World War II; First Indochina War; Suez Crisis; Algerian War
- Awards: Legion of Honour (Commander); Ordre national du Mérite (Commander); Cross for Military Valour

Pierre Crousillac (14 November 1921 – 17 December 2011) was a French Army officer who rose to the rank of général de corps d'armée. A graduate of the École polytechnique and a member of the French Resistance during World War II, he served as a signals officer in the First Indochina War, took part in the French liaison mission to the Israeli army during the Suez Crisis, and commanded the 11th Shock Parachute Battalion during the Algerian War.

He later served as military attaché in Moscow, commanded the 8th Infantry Division at Compiègne, and from 1978 until his retirement in 1981 headed the French military mission to the NATO Military Committee.

== Early life and education ==
Crousillac was born on 14 November 1921 in Brive-la-Gaillarde, in the Corrèze department. He grew up in Tulle and studied in the scientific preparatory classes of the Lycée Louis-le-Grand before entering the École polytechnique in September 1942.

Two months later his studies were interrupted when he was sent to the Chantiers de la jeunesse, where he served as a corporal at Argelès-sur-Mer, Saint-Amans-Soult and Argentat.

== Resistance and Liberation ==
In October 1943, refusing to comply with the Service du travail obligatoire, he joined the Armée secrète in the Brive-la-Gaillarde area, where he commanded a company of maquisards. Like most of his comrades he then joined the Corrèze-Limousin marching regiment and took part in the operations of the Liberation.

He returned to the École polytechnique in 1945 and graduated in 1948 into the engineer branch, before transferring to the signals branch.

== First Indochina War ==
After a first posting in which he was responsible for the communications of the convoys delivering Marshall Plan aid across Europe, he embarked in 1951 aboard the liner La Marseillaise for Saigon to take part in the First Indochina War. As commanding officer of the 21/1 operational signals company, he provided the communications for the major operations of northern Tonkin, in particular at the entrenched camp of Nà Sản.

He was cited in dispatches three times, on the Black River, at Nà Sản and at Phu No Quan, his citations noting his organisational ability and his ascendancy over his men. At the end of his tour he qualified as a paratrooper at Hanoi.

== Suez and Algeria ==
Back in France, he completed his technical training at the École supérieure d'électricité (now CentraleSupélec), graduating in 1955, and after a course at the staff college was posted to the armed forces general staff. In 1956 he took part in the French liaison mission to the Israeli army during the Port Said and Sinai operations of the Suez Crisis. As a captain, he was made a Knight of the Legion of Honour by decree of 14 August 1956.

He was then posted to the 11th Shock Parachute Half-Brigade, commanding successively its marching group (GM 11) from August 1959 to May 1960 and the 11th Shock Parachute Battalion from May 1960 to April 1961, under the operational call sign "Coplan". He took part in operations in Algeria, notably in the border zone and the northern Sahara, for which he was cited in army dispatches.

== Senior appointments ==
On returning from Algeria he joined the 75th course of the École supérieure de guerre (1961–1963). He then alternated staff and command appointments: commander of the signals of the 11th Parachute Division, with several missions in Africa, commander of the signals of the 1st Army Corps, and military attaché in Moscow.

A colonel of the signals branch, he was promoted général de brigade by a decree of 6 December 1972, with effect from 1 January 1973 and while retaining his existing appointment.

He was subsequently deputy to the general commanding the 4th Military Region and then commanded the 8th Infantry Division at Compiègne. He was promoted général de division by a decree of 2 November 1976, with effect from 1 December 1976.

On 24 May 1978 the Council of Ministers appointed him head of the French military mission to the NATO Military Committee, General Alain Bizard succeeding him at the head of the 8th Division. The rank and appellation of général de corps d'armée were conferred on him by a decree of 2 October 1980, with effect from 1 October 1980. He left active service in November 1981.

As a lieutenant-colonel he had been promoted Officer of the Legion of Honour by decree of 7 July 1967; as a général de brigade he was made a Commander of the Ordre national du Mérite by decree of 10 December 1974, and a Commander of the Legion of Honour by decree of 8 July 1981.

== Retirement and death ==
In retirement Crousillac remained active in national and local veterans' associations, notably as honorary president of the Association nationale des anciens des troupes aéroportées (ANATAP). An enthusiast for the medieval town of Turenne, he contributed to its promotion by organising guided tours.

He died on 17 December 2011 at Turenne. His funeral was held on 21 December 2011 at the collegiate church of Turenne and he was buried at Objat. A square in Turenne has borne his name since October 2013.

== Honours ==
- Commander of the Legion of Honour: Knight (decree of 14 August 1956), Officer (7 July 1967), Commander (8 July 1981)
- Commander of the Ordre national du Mérite (decree of 10 December 1974)
- Croix de guerre des théâtres d'opérations extérieures, with vermeil and silver stars (1953)
- Cross for Military Valour, with palm (1961)
- Croix du combattant volontaire de la Résistance
- Croix du combattant volontaire 1939–1945
- Croix du combattant
- Médaille coloniale
- Commemorative medal for the Indochina campaign
- Commemorative medal for security and law-and-order operations
- French commemorative medal for Middle East operations
