= Jean-Émile Charon =

French nuclear physicist, philosopher and writer (1920-1998)

Jean-Émile Charon (French: [ʃaʁɔ̃]; 25 February 1920, in Paris – June 1998, in Paris) was a French nuclear physicist, philosopher and writer. He was the author of over 20 books on physics, scientific philosophy, and computer science. He conducted nuclear research at France's Commissariat à l'énergie atomique (Atomic Energy Authority).

== Selected writings ==
- Charon, J-E. Theorie de la Relativité Complexe. Paris: Albin Michel, 1977.
  - Translated title: Complex Relativity: Unifying All Four Physical Interactions, Paragon House Publishing, 1988.
- Charon, J-E. L'Esprit, cet Inconnu. Paris: Albin Michel, 1977.
  - Translated title: The Spirit: That Stranger Inside Us, Infinity Publishing, 2004.
  - 1st Translation: The Unknown Spirit: The Unity of Spirit and Matter in Space and Time, Coventure, 1983.

== Bibliography ==
- Hoppenot, Éric, ed. (2008). Maurice Blanchot, Écrits politiques: 1953-1993 (in French). Paris: Gallimard. "Jean-Émile Charon, physicien et philosophe français (1920-1988)"
- Charon, Jean E. (2004). The Spirit: That Stranger Inside Us. Infinity Publishing.
- Talbot, Michael (1991). The Holographic Universe. New York: HarperPerennial.
