= René Le Hir =

Breton nationalist

René Le Hir, Reun an Hir in Breton, (1920–1999) was a Breton nationalist.

== Breton nationalist ==
Le Hir was born in Plougastel, Finistère. He participated in Skol Ober, correcting students' homework. He also taught Breton in Brest. He was county chair for the Parti National Breton in Landerneau.

== Collaboration ==
During World War II, Le Hir was a member of the militia working with the Germans against the French Resistance. He was a member of the Kommando de Landerneau, a German group charged with the repression of all attempting to go against the surety of the army. He was also the head of the Service de Bretagne (SBB) for the Canton of Landerneau. He participated in the torture and the execution of many members of the Resistance.

== After war ==
He was jailed for several years for his collaboration with the Nazis. He was jailed alongside Marie‑Thérèse Martin and the local head of the Gestapo for Landerneau, Shaad. After he was released, he lived in Africa where he worked as a technician. He returned to France to work for a ferry company.
