= Marcel Le Roy =

French resistance member (1919–2020)

- Born: 26 October 1919; Niort-la-Fontaine, France
- Died: 21 April 2020 (aged 100); France
- Occupation: Resistance member

Marcel Le Roy (26 October 1919 – 21 April 2020) was a French Resistance member. He served as Mayor of Niort-la-Fontaine, and then General Councillor of the Canton of Lassay-les-Châteaux from 1962 to 1994. He was first a member of the Union for the New Republic, then the Union of Democrats for the Republic, and lastly, the Rally for the Republic.

== Biography ==
At the start of World War II, Le Roy joined the French Air Force, where he became a radio technician. Following the Battle of France, he tried to join England in the war efforts, but he was denied. He then went to Marseille, where he tried and failed to join Free France. He was then contacted by Jean Le Roux, the main transmitter of the Réseau Johnny.

He joined the network in 1941 with the mission of addressing the public on the Occupation. He was taken prisoner on 16 February 1942 in Quimper. He escaped, but was again captured three days later.

He was imprisoned in Angers, Fresnes, and Fort de Romainville. Le Roy was deported to Natzweiler-Struthof in July 1943, then to Kommando d'Erringen, and lastly to Dachau. He was freed on 30 April 1945 from Allach.

== Bibliography ==
- Le Prix de la Liberté. Récit de Déportation au Camp d'Extermination du Struthof (2000)
