= Raymond Cauchetier =

French photographer (1920–2021)

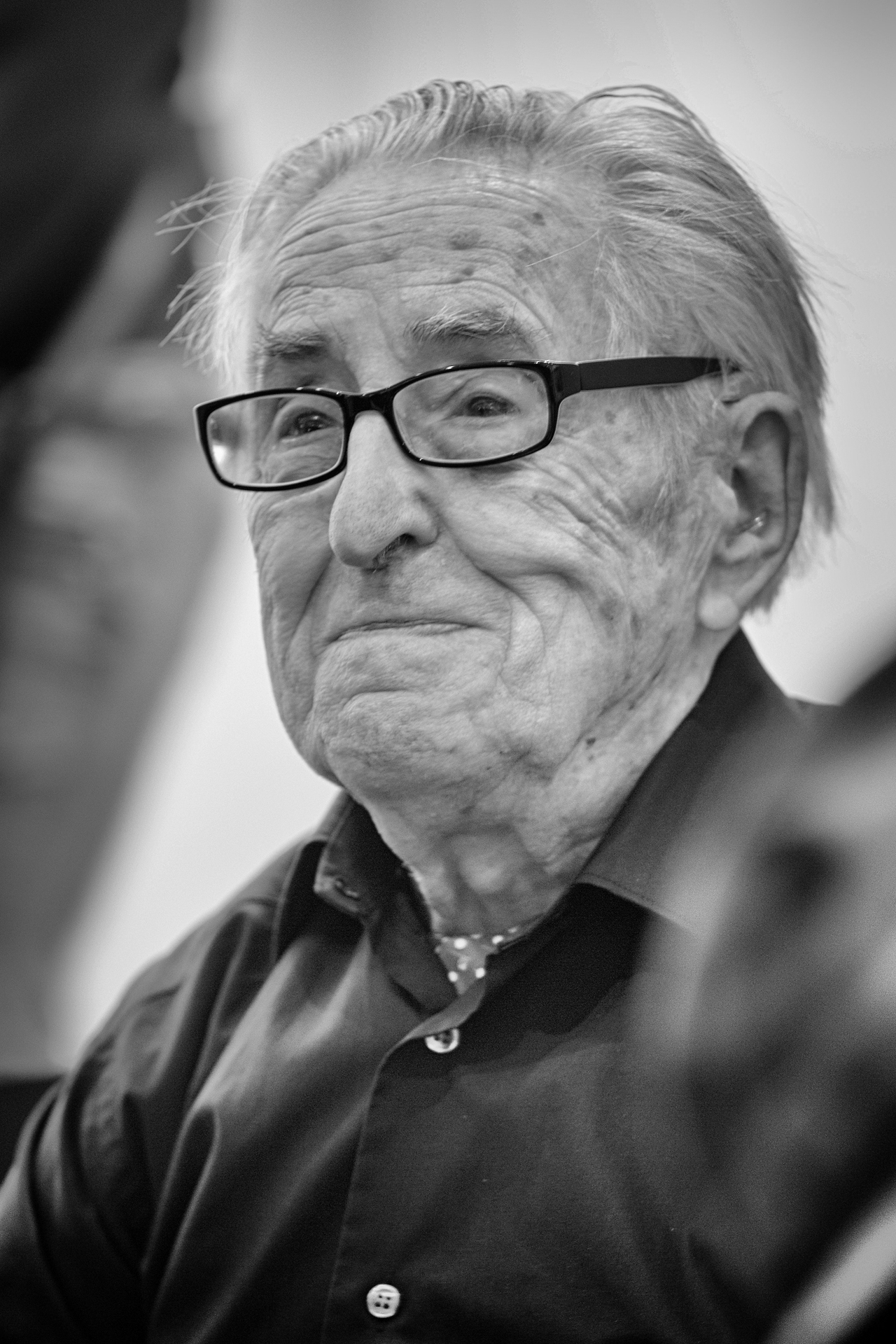
- Born: 10 January 1920; Paris, France
- Died: 22 February 2021 (aged 101); Paris, France
- Occupations: Photographer, Combat photographe

Raymond Cauchetier (French pronunciation: [ʁɛmɔ̃ koʃtje]; 10 January 1920 – 22 February 2021) was a French photographer, known for his work as the set photographer from 1959 to 1968 on many films of the French New Wave. His photographs are an important record of the New Wave directors at the beginning of their careers, and of their unconventional and groundbreaking production methods. A 2009 profile of Cauchetier in Aperture magazine declared that his photographs "are themselves central works of the New Wave."

== Early life ==
Cauchetier was born in Paris on 10 January 1920. His mother worked as a piano teacher. She raised him as a single parent; he never met his father. Cauchetier dropped out after completing grammar school. He escaped from Paris by bicycle and joined the French Resistance after the Fall of France in 1940.

After World War II ended, Cauchetier enlisted in the French Air Force as the First Indochina War was unfolding. He began his career in photography there serving as a combat photographer in Vietnam. He consequently purchased his own Rolleiflex camera and utilized it for most of his career. Cauchetier was conferred the Legion of Honour by Charles de Gaulle, in recognition of his battlefield work.

== Career ==
Cauchetier remained in the region after his service in the Air Force concluded, taking pictures of Angkor Wat in Cambodia. He gifted a set of 3,000 pictures to Norodom Sihanouk, which were ultimately destroyed by the Khmer Rouge. Cauchetier met director Marcel Camus, who was in Cambodia to shoot the film Mort en fraude (Fugitive in Saigon), in 1957. He was subsequently recruited as the set photographer.

Upon Cauchetier's return to France, he failed to find work as a photojournalist. He was instead employed to take pictures for photo-romans, a kind of photographic graphic novel, by publisher Hubert Serra. Through Serra, Cauchetier became acquainted with Jean-Luc Godard, then working as a film critic and hoping to become a filmmaker himself. Godard hired Cauchetier as the set photographer for his debut film, À bout de souffle (1960), a breakthrough both for Godard and for French cinema.

Other films Cauchetier worked on include Léon Morin, prêtre, directed by Jean-Pierre Melville, and Jules et Jim (1962) by François Truffaut. His photographs of the production in 1960 of Godard's film, Une femme est une femme, captured off-camera moments of Godard and lead actress Anna Karina. Godard and Karina married the following year.

Cauchetier stopped working as a set photographer in 1968 due to the job's low pay. He continued publishing photographs, but his images from the New Wave are considered by critics to be his best work.

== Later life ==
Amendments to the copyright law of France in the mid-2000s granted photographers the rights to pictures they had captured as a paid employee. Consequently, many of Cauchetier's previously unseen works were able to be released. His collection titled Photos de Cinéma was published in 2007. Six years later, the Academy of Motion Picture Arts and Sciences hosted an exhibition of his work in Los Angeles. He went on to publish the artist's book Raymond Cauchetier’s New Wave in 2015.

Cauchetier turned 100 in January 2020. In September of that year, an exhibition of his notable photos was held at the Galerie de l'Instant in Paris. He died five months later on 22 February 2021, in Paris. He was 101, and was diagnosed with COVID-19 during the COVID-19 pandemic in France prior to his death.

== Sources ==
- Brody, Richard (Winter 2009), "Raymond Cauchetier & The French New Wave", Aperture (197): 30–37
