= Bernard Pertuiset =

French neurosurgeon (1920–2000)

- Born: 28 October, 1920; Paris
- Died: 29 November, 2000
- Occupations: Doctor, Neurosurgeon

Bernard Pertuiset (1920-2000) was a French neurosurgeon, born in Paris on 28 October, 1920.

He spent four years of internship in a service of neurology at La Pitié-Salpêtrière Hospital with T. Alajouanine. He got his medical diploma in 1949, writing a thesis on cranioplasty. He was an assistant of Dr Petit-Dutaillis in La Pitie Hospital neurosurgical service where he developed his career until retirement on 1 October 1990. In 1949-1950, he acted at the Montreal Neurological Institute as a research fellow in neurophysiology under the direction of H. Jasper, and also was allowed by W. Penfield to analyze the records of operated epileptic patients and involvement in a paper on bitemporal epilepsy.

From 1949 to 1990, he wrote, as senior author, 356 papers on all aspects of neurosurgery. Moreover, he wrote: 4 books on epidermoids (1957), Cranio cerebral topography (1959), Acoustic neuromas (1970) and Ruptured saccular aneurysms (1987). Most of his clinical and fundamental research was devoted to cerebral vascular malformations. He delivered 3 international lectures: Olivecrona in Stockholm (1981), European in Warsaw (1986) and at Henrich Kluver in Chicago (1990).

He developed the profound arterial hypotension technique to make open aneurysmal surgery in a safer way. He developed a neurosurgical service of 90 beds, with a staff of 2 Associate Professors and 3 neurosurgeons. Co-founders of Advances and Technical Standards in Neurosurgery.

== Chronology ==
- 1958: Neurochirurgien des Hopitaux de Paris in La Pitie Hospital in Paris
- 1961: Assistant Professor of Marcel David
- 1969: Professor and Chairman
- 1975-1979: President of the European Association of Neurosurgical Societies.
- 1981-1988: Chairman of the World Federation of Neurosurgical Societies Liaison Committee organizing an educational course in Taipei and Seoul
- 1990: Retired
- 2000: Died on 29 November
