= Joséphine Berthault =

French painter

Joséphine Berthault, painter
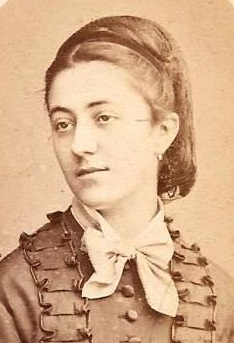
- Born: 20 November 1853; Angers, France
- Died: 6 August 1923 (aged 69); Angers, France

Joséphine Berthault (20 November 1853 – 6 August 1923) was a French painter.

== Life ==
Joséphine was born in Angers, studied academic painting and drawing from a young age and was a student of her successful uncle, Jules Lenepveu. She married Fernand Berthault (1849–1930) who was also a painter.

Joséphine Berthault was active between 1877 and 1892, created mostly landscapes, portraits, and still lifes, and was one of a select group of women painters of the nineteenth century who exhibited their art throughout France. She also taught art to many students at her studio, located at Ralliement place in Angers, in the building built for her father-in-law Gaspard Berthault (1820–1900). Gaspard was a photographer and scenic painter who became known for his portraits in daguerreotypes.

== Honors ==
Distinctions awarded to Joséphine Berthault.

- Officer of the academy in 1899
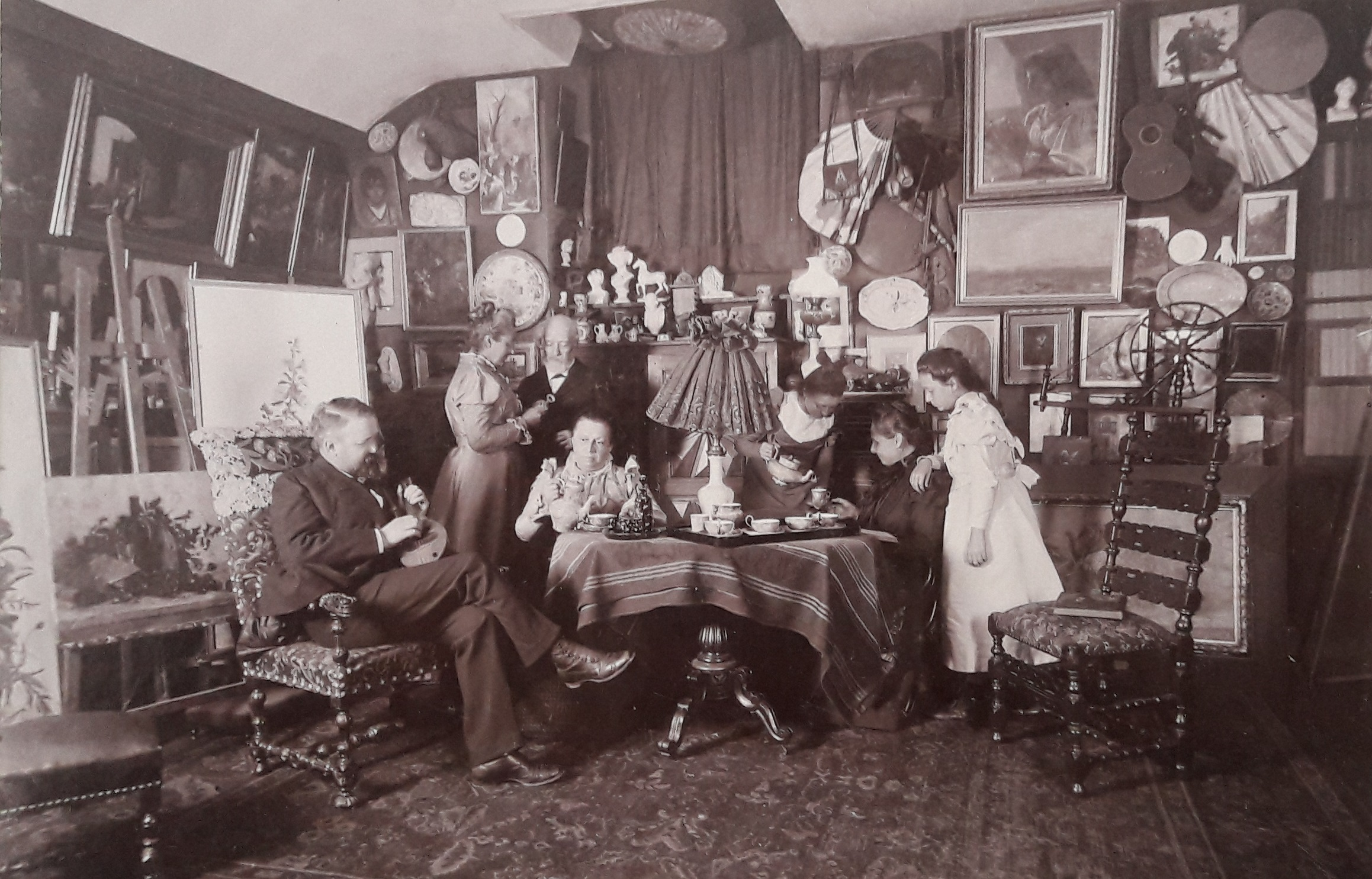
- Studio of Joséphine Berthault
  Honorable Mention at a Paris Salon in 1890
- Member, Society of French Artists
- Exposition Medals of Anger, Laval, and Tours.
- Showing "Portrait de mon oncle M. Jules Lenepveu" at the Museum of Beaux-Arts, Angers in 1892

== Gallery ==
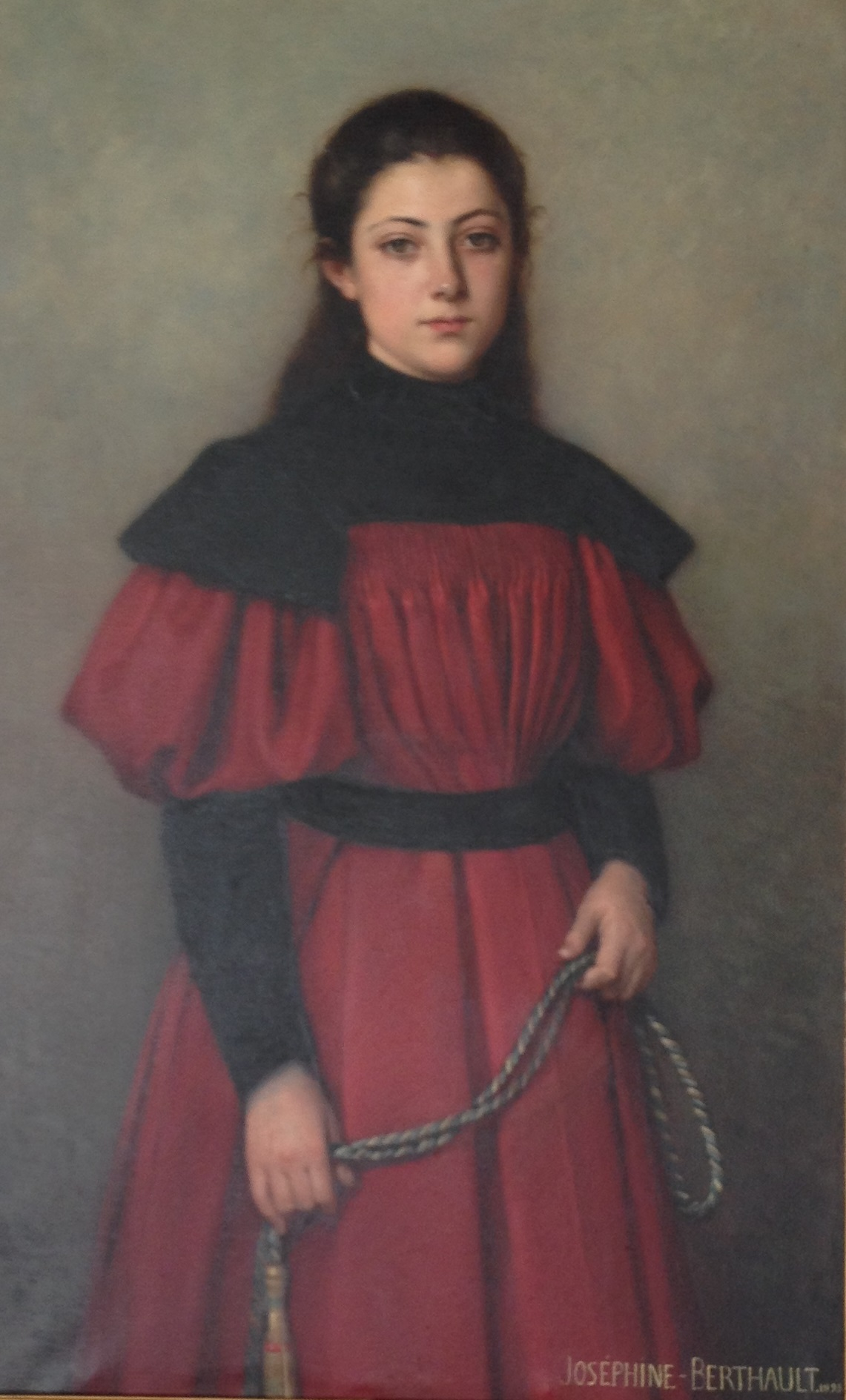
Florence Berthault, her daughter

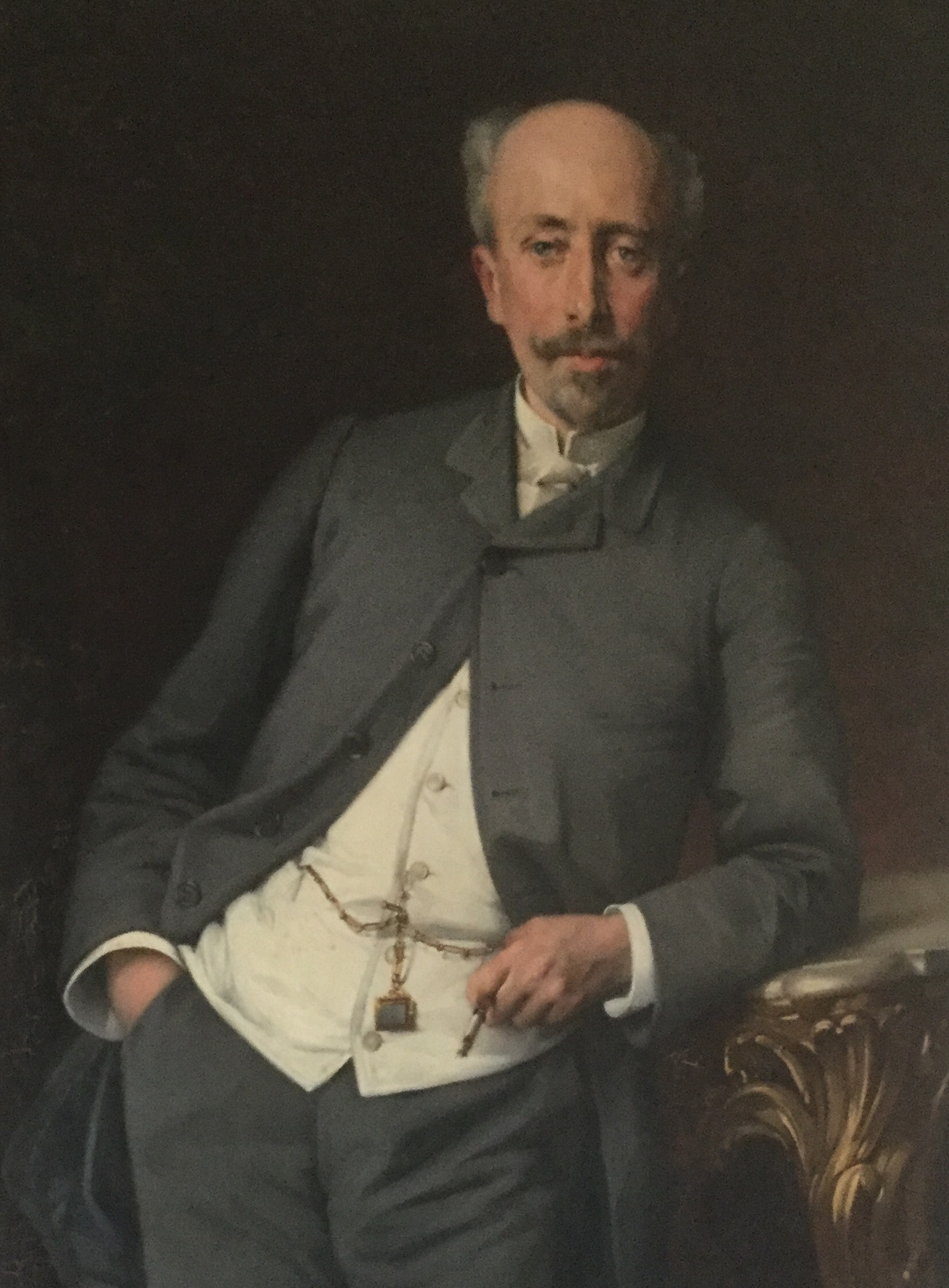
Fernand Berthault, her husband

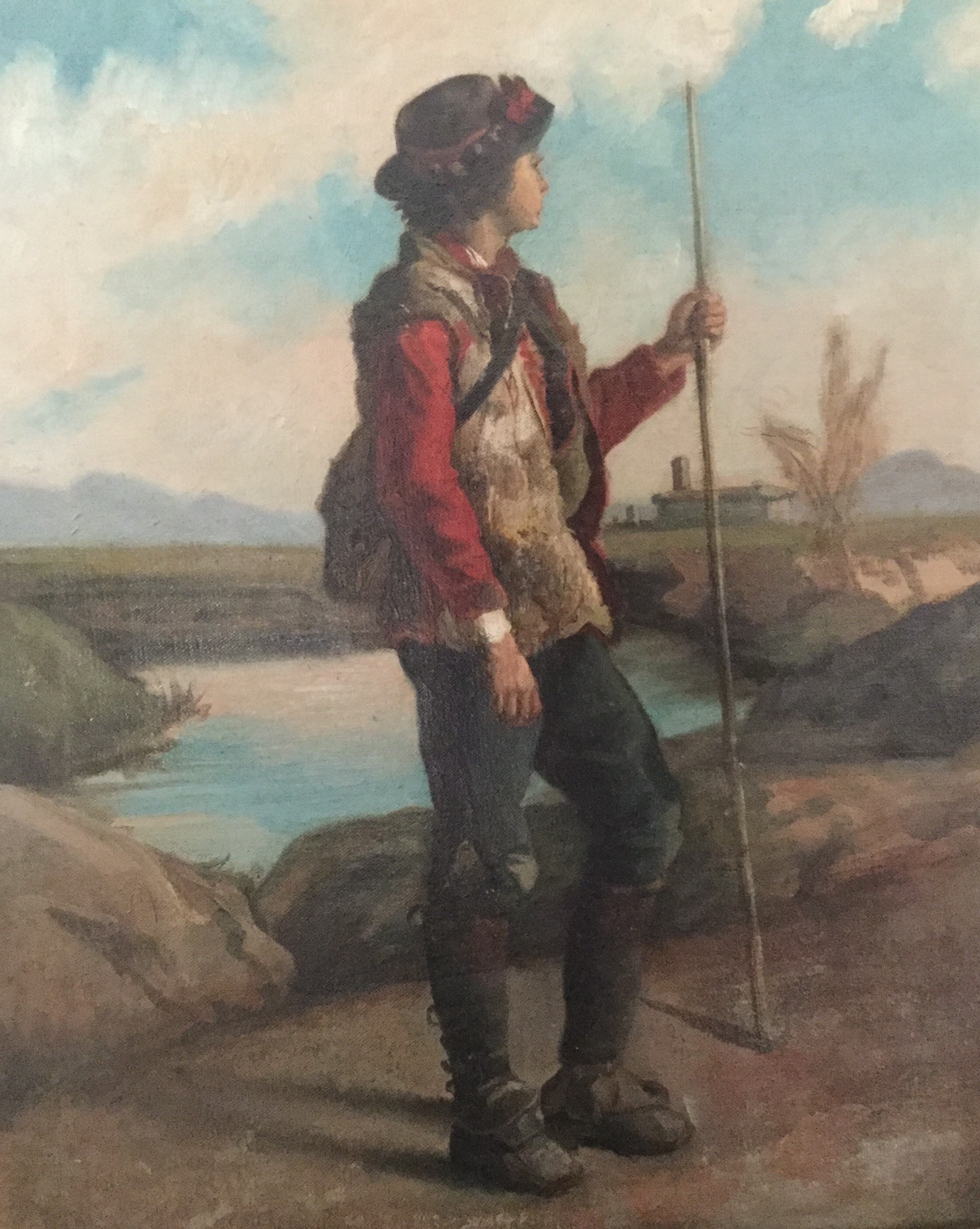
Shepherd

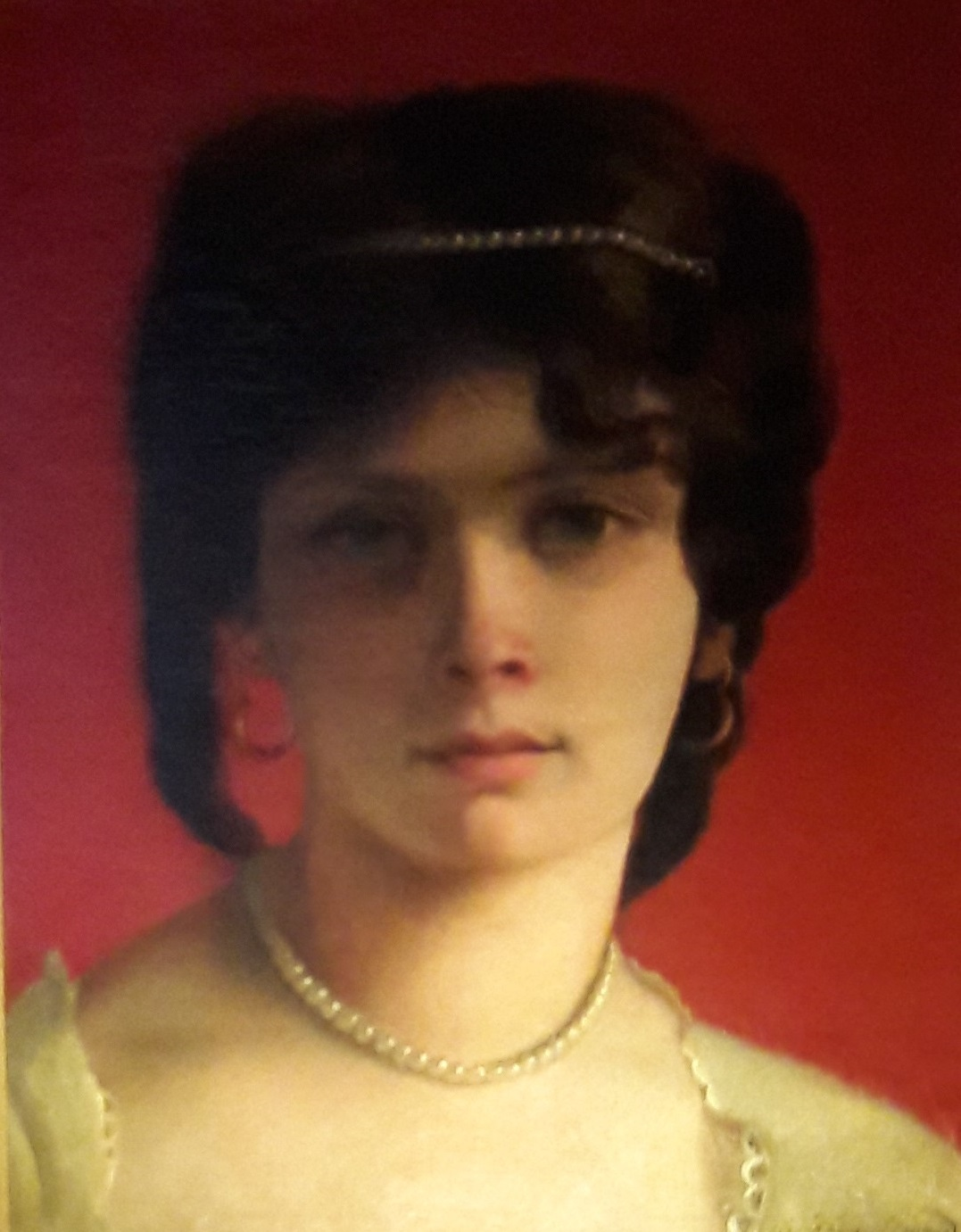
Portrait of a woman

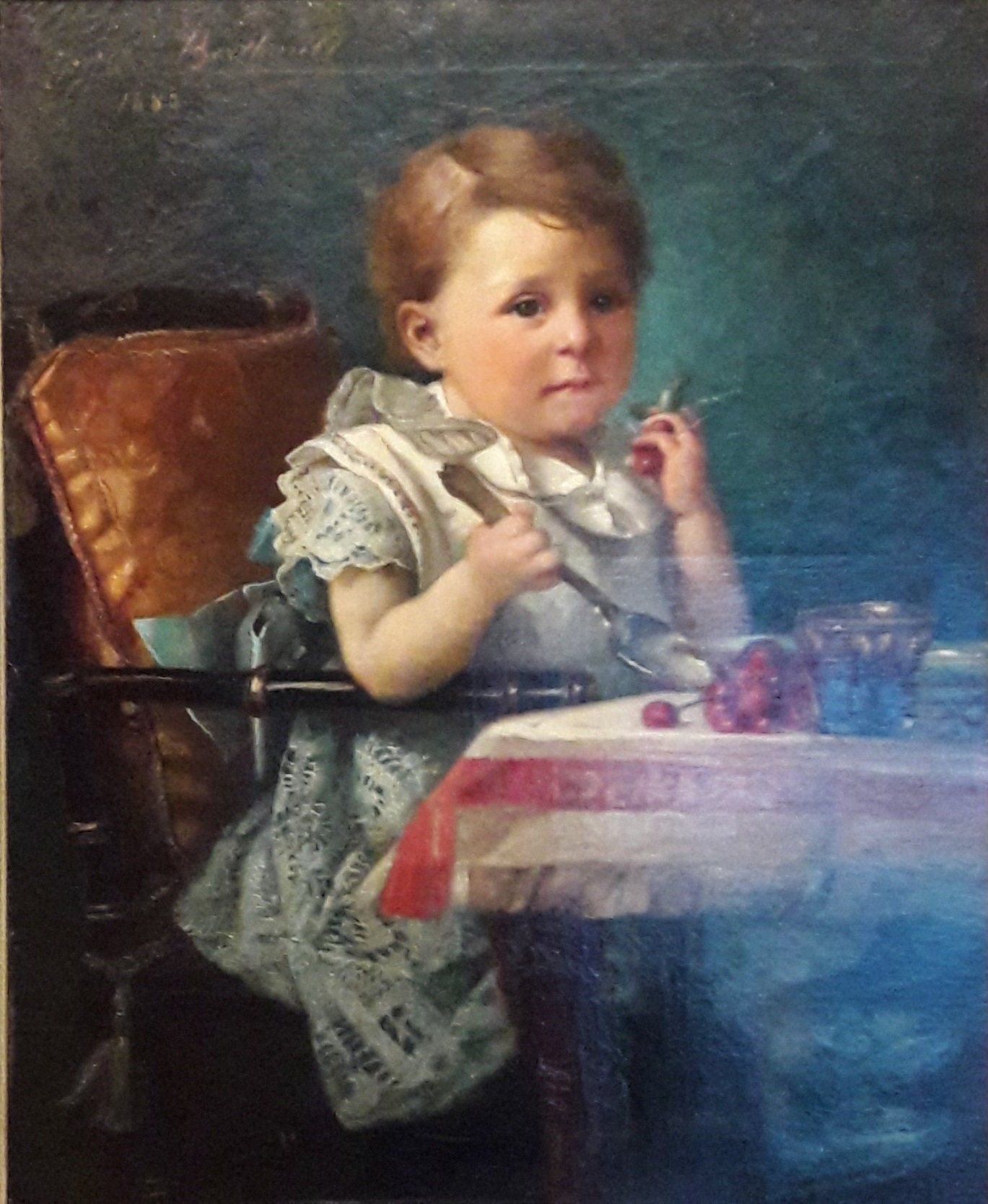
Infant with cherries

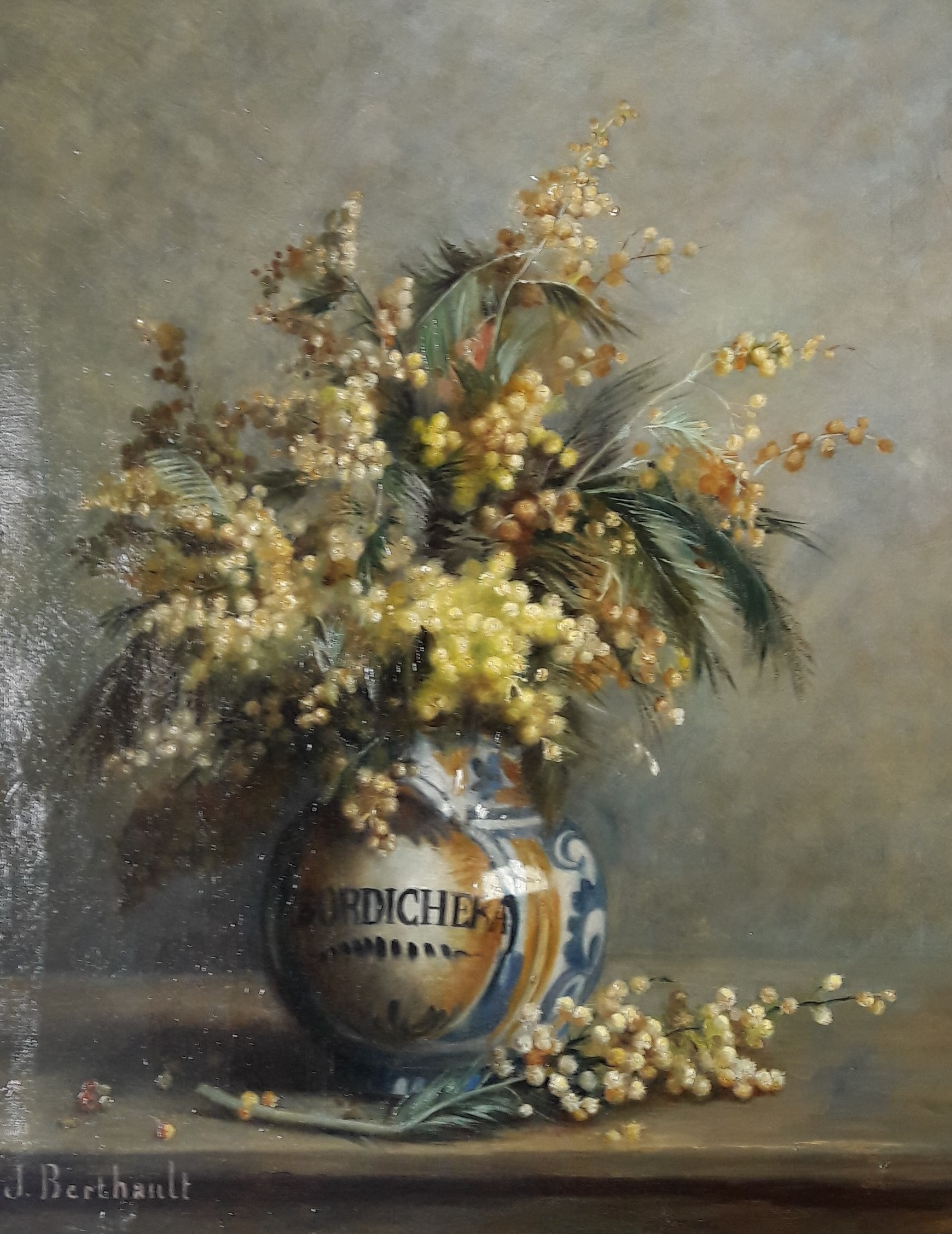
Still life
