= Lucien Braun =

French philosophy historian (1923–2020)

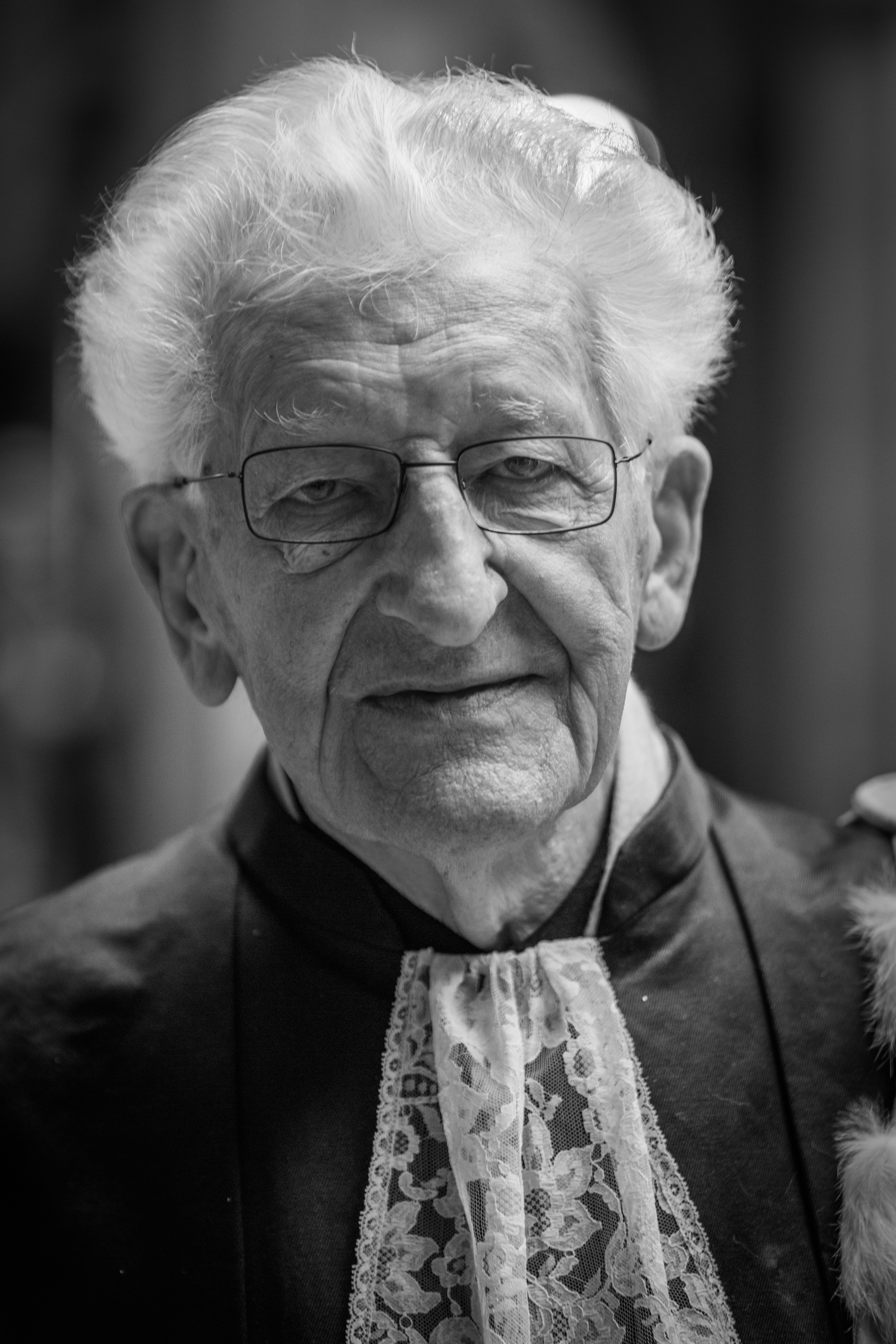
- Born: 24 February 1923; Littenheim, France
- Died: 13 March 2020 (aged 97); Strasbourg, France
- Occupations: Historian; Philosopher

Lucien Braun (24 February 1923 – 13 March 2020) was a French philosophy historian who specialized in Paracelsus.

== Biography ==
Braun wrote his version of Histoire de l'histoire de la philosophie. At the end of his introduction, he wrote:

"We believe that we have thus opened up the field of research for which we had no model; because when we undertook this study, in 1961, the subject was new. It is already less so today, because works towards a history of the history of philosophy are announced, in Germany by L. Geldsetzer and W. Ehrhardt, in France by M. Gueroult. This means that we are, in fact, participating in a concern that goes beyond us and which, as such, is also part of the development of discipline."

He served as President of the Presses universitaires de Strasbourg and the Université populaire européenne, also in Strasbourg. He was a professor emeritus of Marc Bloch University, of which he was President from 1978 to 1983.

Braun was a Commander of the Ordre des Palmes académiques.

== Works ==
- Paracelsus und die Philosophiegeschichte. Eine systematische Betrachtung (1965)
- Histoire de l'histoire de la philosophie (1973)
- Paracelse, nature et philosophie (1981)
- Studia Paracelsica. Grundsätzliche Einführung in Hohenheims Gedankenwelt (1983)
- Musique et philosophie (1987)
- Paracelse (1988)
- Conrad Gesner (1990)
- Iconographie et philosophie (1996)
- L'Image de la philosophie. Méconnaissance et reconnaissance (2005)
- Philosophes et philosophie en représentation : l'iconographie philosophique en question(s) (2010)
