= François Ozenda =

French painter

François Ozenda (1923–1976) was a French painter.

== Biography ==
He was born in Marseille, France. He spent his childhood there, in a modest family. He left school at age 14 as a result of a motorcycle accident. He worked various trades, generally living off the barter of his art and support from his friends.

He claimed to have learned painting in three months by attending the art school in Marseille, France. A painter and mystical poet, he painted in a surrealistic style filled with esotericism and spirituality. Between 1950 and 1976, he mixed the artistic life with living on the Mediterranean coast. He had several exhibitions, especially in the South of France in particular in Vence and the Galerie Alphonse Chave.

In 1973, he settled in Salernes, France, and died of a heart attack in 1976.

After his death, retrospectives were devoted to him, in Paris, Lyon, Marseille, and Trans-en-Provence.
