= Sternenberg, Haut-Rhin =

Commune in Grand Est, France

Sternenberg
- Commune
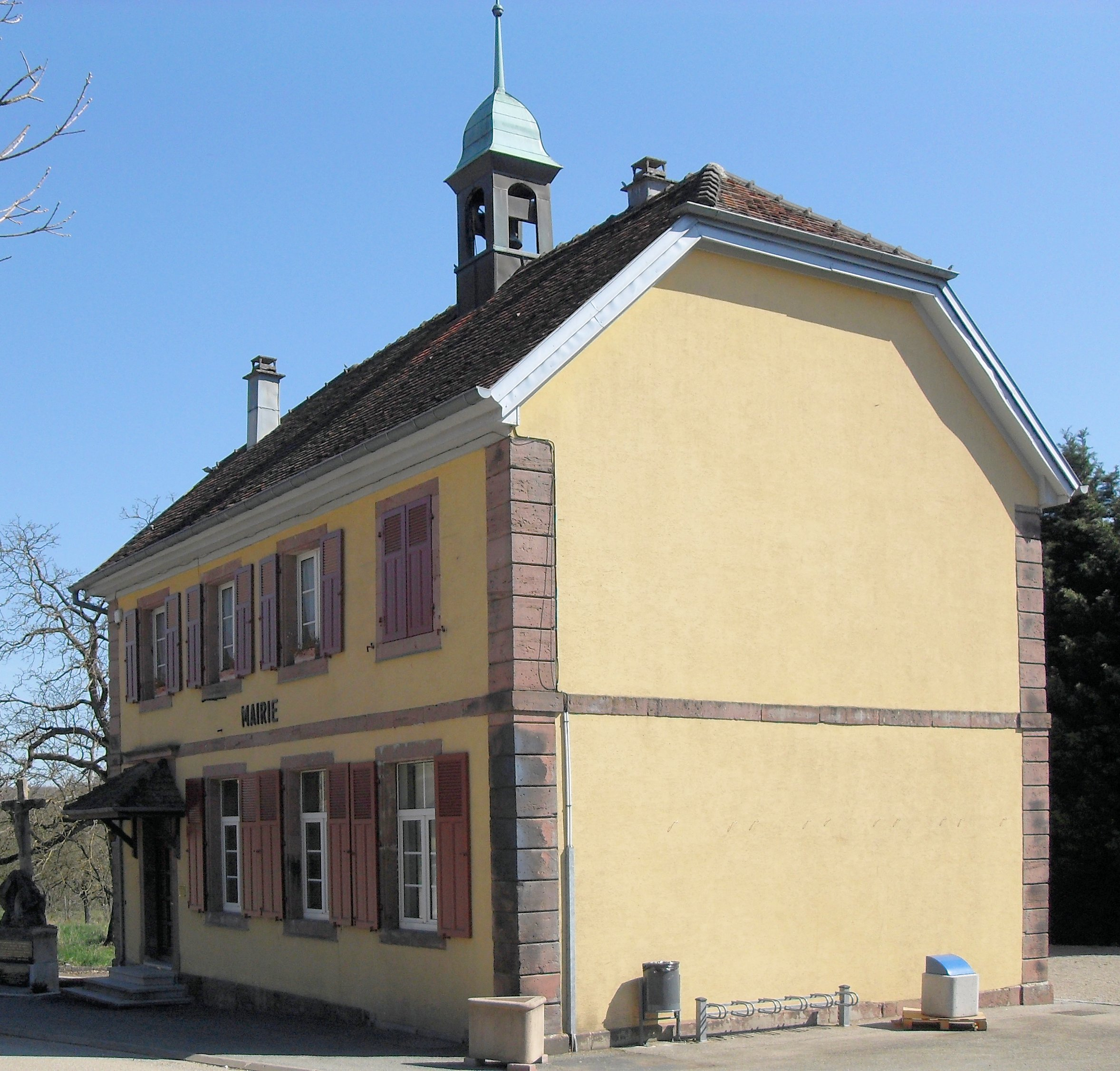
- The town hall in Sternenberg

- Coat of arms
- Location of Sternenberg
- Location within France Location within Grand Est
- Coordinates: 47°41′48″N 7°05′40″E
- Country: France
- Region: Grand Est
- Department: Haut-Rhin
- Arrondissement: Altkirch
- Canton: Masevaux-Niederbruck

Government
  - Mayor (2020–2026): Bernard Sutter
- Area^{1}: 3.44 km^{2} (1.33 sq mi)
- Elevation: 335 m (1,099 ft)
- Highest elevation: 381 m (1,250 ft)
- Lowest elevation: 299 m (981 ft)
- Population (2023): 142
  - Density: 41.3/km^{2} (107/sq mi)
- Time zone: UTC+01:00 (CET)
  - Summer (DST): UTC+02:00 (CEST)
- INSEE/Postal code: 68326 /68780
- ^{1} French Land Register data, which excludes lakes, ponds, glaciers > 1 km^{2} (0.386 sq mi or 247 acres) and river estuaries.

Sternenberg is a commune in the Haut-Rhin department in Alsace in north-eastern France.

== See also ==
- Communes of the Haut-Rhin department
