= Jean Pierre Capron =

French painter (1921–1997)

Jean-Pierre Rene Capron (August 4, 1921 – July 2, 1997) was a French painter known for creating muted landscapes with a haunting, lonely feeling, yet with a hint of life in the midst of the emptiness.

== Biography ==
=== Early life and education ===
Jean Pierre Capron was born in Cannes, France, August 4, 1921. He studied architecture in Lausanne, Switzerland, then moved to Paris in 1945 where he enrolled at the École des Beaux Arts in the studio of Eugène Narbonne and formed a friendship with Bernard Buffet.

=== Career ===
Capron exhibited for the first time at the Salon d'Automne in 1949 and participated in several important salons and group shows in France and abroad.

In 1950, he had his first exhibition in Paris in Maurice Garnier, Visconti Gallery. In 1952, he won two major national awards in France, which led to a series of regular exhibitions in Paris galleries. (Gallery Drouant-David, then Drouant Gallery).

In 1961, he had his first exhibition in the United States at the Pomeroy Gallery in San Francisco. He also had a major 1965 exhibit in Chicago and a 1966 exhibit in New York City at the Frank Partridge Gallery.

Today his works are found evenly distributed in the United States, France and Japan.

=== Death and legacy ===
Capron died in 1997, leaving a substantial number of landscape paintings and several portraits. His work is in the permanent collections of the Musee d'Art Moderne, the Musee de la Ville de Paris, and the Musee de Poitiers.

== Awards and honors ==
Capron received the Prix Conte-Carriere in 1951. He was a member of the jury of the Salon de la Jeune Peinture from 1951 to 1968.
