= Jean Rosenthal (translator) =

French translator (1923–2020)

- Born: 2 August 1923; Paris, France
- Died: 26 August 2020 (aged 97)
- Occupations: Translator; Journalist

Jean Rosenthal (2 August 1923 – 26 August 2020) was a French translator and journalist.

== Biography ==
A journalist, Rosenthal was also one of the most famous translators of English into French in the second half of the 20th century. His translation of City by Clifford D. Simak at the Club français du livre in 1952 made him well-known in publishing circles. He was fascinated with literature from the United States and helped numerous American authors become well-known in France, including Isaac Asimov, Fredric Brown, A. E. van Vogt, and, later, Ken Follett.

Rosenthal also translated works by John Dos Passos, Henry Miller, John Steinbeck, Saki, Desmond Morris, Eric L. Harry, Philip Roth, John le Carré, and Patricia Highsmith. A leader of a translation workshop, he was responsible for translating many more works.

Jean Rosenthal died on 26 August 2020 at the age of 97.
