= Maurice Paul Delorme =

- Titular Bishop of Ottocium
- Church: Roman Catholic Church
- See: Titular See of Ottocium
- In office: 1975 - present

Orders
- Ordination: October 11, 1942

Personal details
- Born: November 20, 1919; Lyon, France
- Died: December 27, 2012 (aged 93); Lyon, France

Maurice Paul Delorme (November 20, 1919 – December 27, 2012) was a French prelate of the Roman Catholic Church.

Delorme was born in Lyon, and ordained to the priesthood on October 11, 1942, in Lyon. He was appointed auxiliary bishop of the Archdiocese of Lyon as well as titular bishop of Ottocium on October 2, 1975, and ordained a bishop on November 16, 1975. Delorme remained auxiliary bishop of Lyon until his retirement on December 3, 1994, and continued to serve as titular bishop of Ottocium until his death in Lyon, aged 93.
