= Pierre Garat (civil servant) =

Pierre Garat (11 April 1919 – 5 November 1976) was a high-level civil servant of Vichy France born in Dax, Landes. From 25 August 1943, he was the head of the service for the Jewish question for the Gironde. He was a member of the UJPF (a section of the PPF) and (according to the CDL for the Gironde) a member of the Petainist organisation "Les Amis du Maréchal" (The Marshal's Friends).

In August 1943, Pierre Garat was made director of the cabinet of Pierre-René Gazagne, Préfet of Landes. On the liberation of Bordeaux, his dossier was examined by the Comité départemental de libération for the Gironde, who put him and Maurice Papon on its list of people to separate from state service. Nevertheless, he was made sous-préfet at Dax in August 1944, then at Blaye in September.

In 1947, he re-assumed the Préfet Gazagne, became secretary-general of the general government of Algeria, becoming the director of its cabinet. He remained untried right up to his death in 1976 in Carnoux-en-Provence.
