= 1855 in France =

- Decades: 1830s; 1840s; 1850s; 1860s; 1870s
- See also: History of France; Timeline of French history; List of years in France

Events from the year 1855 in France.

== Incumbents ==
- Monarch – Napoleon III

== Events ==
- 1 March – Compagnie Générale des Omnibus established to secure a monopoly over horse-drawn omnibuses in Paris.
- 16 April – Emperor Napoleon III, with Empress Eugénie, begins a 6-day state visit to Britain.
- 18 April – The Bordeaux Wine Official Classification of 1855, requested by Napoleon III for the Exposition Universelle (opening 15 May), first appears.
- 15 May–15 November – Exposition Universelle (an early World's fair) officially opens in Paris.
- 16 June – Compagnie des chemins de fer de l'Ouest formed by amalgamation.
- 16 August – Battle of Chernaya River: Russian troops are defeated by French and Sardinian forces in the Crimean War.
- 18 August – Queen Victoria of the United Kingdom, with Prince Albert, begins a 10-day state visit to Paris, the first visit of a reigning British monarch to France since 1413. While there, she visits the Exposition Universelle.
- 7 September – Battle of Malakoff, French victory over Russian forces, part of the siege of Sevastopol in the Crimean War.
- 11 September – Siege of Sevastopol (1854–1855) ends in Franco-British victory.
- 17 October – Battle of Kinburn (Crimean War) – Combined French and British forces subdue Russian shore forts. The successful use of French floating batteries makes this the first use of modern ironclad warships in action.
- 17 December – London General Omnibus Company established in Paris as the Compagnie Générale des Omnibus de Londres; in the following year it will absorb a substantial proportion of horse-drawn omnibus operators in London.
- Undated – Réunion des Organismes d'Assurance Mutuelle (ROAM) association is founded.

== Births ==
- 20 January – Ernest Chausson, composer (died 1899)
- 15 February – Jean-Joseph Carriès, sculptor, ceramist, and miniaturist (died 1894)
- 18 February – Jean Jules Jusserand, author and diplomat (died 1932)
- 16 March – Achille Maffre de Baugé, poet (died 1928)
- 27 April – Caroline Rémy de Guebhard, socialist, journalist and feminist (died 1929)
- 27 September – Paul Émile Appell, mathematician (died 1930)
- 5 November – Léon Teisserenc de Bort, meteorologist (died 1913)
- 10 November – Alexandre Darracq, automobile manufacturer (died 1931)

== Deaths ==
- 15 January – Henri Braconnot, chemist and pharmacist (born 1780)
- 26 January – Gérard de Nerval, poet, essayist and translator (born 1808)
- 3 March
  - Jacques-Charles Dupont de l'Eure, lawyer and Prime Minister (born 1767)
  - Antoine-Geneviève-Héraclius-Agénor de Gramont, aristocrat (born 1789)
- 18 April – Jean-Baptiste Isabey, painter (born 1767)
- 26 May – Jean Isidore Harispe, Marshal of France (born 1768)
- 10 June – Jacques-Jean Barre, engraver (born 1793)
- 22 July – Raymond Gayrard, sculptor (born 1807)
- 23 October – François André Michaux, botanist (born 1770)
- 25 November – Pierre-Justin-Marie Macquart, entomologist (born 1778)
- 2 December – Frédéric Berat, poet and songwriter (born 1801)

== The arts ==
- 15 May–15 November – The Exposition Universelle includes a retrospective of the paintings of Jean Auguste Dominique Ingres. Gustave Courbet, having had several paintings rejected for the Exposition, exhibits in a temporary "Pavillon du Réalisme" adjacent.
- 13 June – Verdi's opera Les vêpres siciliennes (The Sicilian Vespers) is premiered in Paris.
- 5 July – Jacques Offenbach inaugurates performances of operettas as director of his own Théâtre des Bouffes-Parisiens.
- October – Victor Hugo moves to Hauteville House, Saint Peter Port, Guernsey, in the Channel Islands, accompanied by his mistress, Juliette Drouet.
- Jean-François Millet produces the engraving "Study of a Woman Churning Butter".
