= 1853 in France =

- Decades: 1830s; 1840s; 1850s; 1860s; 1870s
- See also: History of France; Timeline of French history; List of years in France

Events from the year 1853 in France.

== Incumbents ==
- Monarch – Napoleon III

== Events ==
- 30 June - Georges-Eugène Haussmann is selected as préfect of the Seine (department) to begin the re-planning of Paris.
- 6 December - Taiping Rebellion: French minister de Bourboulon arrives at the Heavenly Capital aboard the Cassini.
- 14 December - Compagnie Générale des Eaux established by imperial decree.
- Arthur de Gobineau begins publication of his An Essay on the Inequality of the Human Races (Essai sur l'inégalité des races humaines).

== Births ==
- 20 January - Marguerite de Witt-Schlumberger, feminist campaigner (died 1924).
- 23 April - Jules Auguste Lemire, priest and social reformer (died 1928).
- 27 April - Jules Lemaître, critic and dramatist (died 1914).
- 21 May - Jacques Marie Eugène Godefroy Cavaignac, politician (died 1905).
- 14 July - Henri Menier, businessman and adventurer (died 1913).
- 24 July - Henri-Alexandre Deslandres, astronomer (died 1948).
- 14 August – Dominique-Marie Gauchet, admiral (died 1931)
- 9 September - Pierre Marie, neurologist (died 1940).
- 30 October - Louise Abbéma, painter and designer (died 1927).
- 17 December - Pierre Paul Émile Roux, physician, bacteriologist and immunologist (died 1933).
- 26 December - René Bazin, novelist (died 1932).
- 30 December - André Messager, composer and conductor (died 1929).

== Deaths ==
- 8 January - Claude-Laurent Bourgeois de Jessaint, aristocrat and civic administrator (born 1764).
- 20 February - Jean-François Bayard, playwright (born 1796).
- 3 April - Louis Gustave le Doulcet, comte de Pontécoulant, politician (born 1764).
- 11 April - Louis-Emmanuel Jadin, composer, pianist and harpsichordist (born 1768).
- 23 April - Auguste Laurent, chemist (born 1807).
- 27 May - Jean Marie Pardessus, lawyer (born 1772).
- May - Henri-Bernard Dabadie, baritone (born 1797).
- 3 September - Augustin Saint-Hilaire, botanist and traveller (born 1799).
- 10 October - Pierre François Léonard Fontaine, architect, interior decorator and designer (born 1762).
