= 1851 in France =

- Decades: 1830s; 1840s; 1850s; 1860s; 1870s
- See also: History of France; Timeline of French history; List of years in France

Events from the year 1851 in France.

== Events ==
- 1 July - Serial poisoner Hélène Jégado is arrested in Rennes.
- 17 July - Victor Hugo uses the phrase United States of Europe in a speech to the National Assembly.
- 2 December - French coup d'état of 1851 is staged by President Louis-Napoléon Bonaparte, dissolving the National Assembly.
- 6 December - Trial of Hélène Jégado begins; she is eventually sentenced to death and executed by guillotine.
- 21 December - Constitutional referendum held, approving President Louis Napoléon Bonaparte, who had been limited to a single four-year term, serving for ten additional years.
- Messageries Maritimes merchant shipping company founded as Messageries nationales, initially for service to the Middle East.
- Grands Goulets road completed
- The Charles Heidsieck champagne house is established.

== Births ==
- 27 March - Vincent d'Indy, composer (died 1931)
- 6 April - Guillaume Bigourdan, astronomer (died 1932)
- 15 April - Anne Boutiaut Poulard, cook (died 1931)
- 21 April - Charles Barrois, geologist and palaeontologist (died 1939)
- 6 May - Aristide Bruant, singer, comedian and nightclub owner (died 1925)
- 21 May - Léon Bourgeois, politician, Prime Minister, awarded Nobel Peace Prize in 1920 (died 1925)
- 29 June - Jane Dieulafoy, born Jeanne Magre, archaeologist and novelist (died 1916)
- 30 September - Auguste Molinier, historian (died 1904)
- 2 October - Ferdinand Foch, Marshal of France, military theorist and writer (died 1929)

== Deaths ==
- 28 February - Guillaume Dode de la Brunerie, Marshal of France, (born 1775)
- 19 October - Marie Thérèse of France, eldest child of King Louis XVI (born 1778)
- 26 November - Jean-de-Dieu Soult, Marshal General of France and three times Prime Minister of France (born 1769)
