= 1933 in France =

- Decades: 1910s; 1920s; 1930s; 1940s; 1950s
- See also: History of France; Timeline of French history; List of years in France

This article lists notable events, births and deaths from the year 1933 in France. Major occurrences include the founding of Air France via merger, and the Lagny-Pomponne rail accident, which killed 204 people.

== Introduction ==
France was insulated during the great depression due to the fact their economy was insulated with a focus on agriculture. Due to this, France's social, political, and economic year was far superior to the rest of Europe. The country celebrated the 30th anniversary of the Tour de France and mourned the loss of 200 citizens in the country's second-worst train accident, the Lagny-Pomponne Railroad Disaster.

== Incumbents ==
- President: Albert Lebrun
- President of the Council of Ministers:
  - until 31 January: Joseph Paul-Boncour
  - 31 January-26 October: Édouard Daladier
  - 26 October-26 November: Albert Sarraut
  - starting 26 November: Camille Chautemps

== Events ==
- 30 January – Édouard Daladier forms a government in France
- 15 July – Four-Power Pact is signed by Britain, France, Germany, and Italy
- 7 October – Air France is formed from a merger of Air Orient, Air Union, Compagnie Générale Aéropostale, Compagnie Internationale de Navigation Aérienne (CIDNA), and Société Générale de Transport Aérien (SGTA).
- 24 December – Lagny-Pomponne Railroad Disaster between Lagny and Pomponne (east of Paris) leaves over 200 dead; it is the second worst railroad disaster in French history

== Sport ==
- 27 June – 23 July – Tour de France takes place, won by Georges Speicher
- December – An exhibition match between Great Britain and Australia at Paris' Stade Pershing inspires the beginnings of rugby league in France

== Births ==
=== January to June ===
- 8 January – Jean-Marie Straub, filmmaker
- 17 January
  - Prince Sadruddin Aga Khan, United Nations High Commissioner for Refugees (died 2003)
  - Dalida, singer (died 1987)
- 29 January – Sacha Distel, singer (died 2004)
- 13 February – Emanuel Ungaro, fashion designer (died 2019)
- 15 March – Philippe de Broca, film director (died 2004)
- 27 March – Michel Guérard, chef
- 30 March – Jean-Claude Brialy, actor and director (died 2007)
- 1 April – Claude Cohen-Tannoudji, physicist
- 9 April – Jean-Paul Belmondo, film actor (died 2021)
- 14 April – Georges Duboeuf, wine merchant (died 2020)
- 10 May – Françoise Fabian, actress
- 18 May – Bernadette Chirac, politician and wife of Jacques Chirac (died 2026)
- 21 May – Maurice André, trumpeter (died 2012)
- 22 June – Jacques Martin, television presenter and producer (died 2007)
- 27 June – René-Jean Jacquet, soccer goalkeeper (died 1993)

=== July to December ===
- 18 July
  - Cécile Guillaume, first woman to engrave French postal stamps (died 2004)
  - Jean Yanne, humorist, actor and film director (died 2003)
- 19 July – Michel Lévêque, diplomat and politician
- 7 October – Gilbert Chapron, boxer (died 2016)
- 17 October – Françoise Garner, soprano (died 2024)
- 22 November – Juliette Carré, actress (died 2023)
- 30 November – Jeanloup Sieff, photographer (died 2000)

== Deaths ==
- 12 February – Henri Duparc, composer (born 1848)
- 24 May – Ludovic Arrachart, aviator, aviation accident (born 1897)
- 25 June – Jean Cugnot, Olympic cyclist (born 1899)
- 14 July – Raymond Roussel, writer (born 1877)
- 18 July – Charles Prince, actor (born 1872)
- 17 September – Jules Culot, entomologist (born 1861)
- 5 October – Renée Adorée, actress (born 1898)
- 23 October – Maurice de la Taille, priest and writer (born 1872)
- 29 October
  - Albert Calmette, physician, bacteriologist and immunologist (born 1863)
  - Paul Painlevé, mathematician and statesman, 62nd Prime Minister of France (born 1863)
- 3 November – Pierre Paul Émile Roux, physician, bacteriologist and immunologist (born 1853)
- 23 November – François Albert, journalist (born 1874)
- 6 December – Auguste Chapuis, composer (born 1858)

== See also ==
- Interwar France
- List of French films of 1933
