= 1854 in France =

- Decades: 1830s; 1840s; 1850s; 1860s; 1870s
- See also: History of France; Timeline of French history; List of years in France

Events from the year 1854 in France.

== Incumbents ==
- Monarch – Napoleon III

== Events ==
- 27 March - United Kingdom declares war on Russia and Crimean War begins.
- 28 March - France declares war on Russia.
- 16 August - Russian troops in the island of Bomarsund in Åland surrender to French-British troops.
- 18 August - Siege of Petropavlovsk by Anglo-French naval forces begins.
- 20 September - Battle of Alma, Anglo-French force defeats the Russians in the first battle of the war.
- 17 October - Siege of Sevastopol by Anglo-French forces begins.
- 25 October - Battle of Balaclava, indecisive battle between the allied forces of the United Kingdom, Second French Empire, and the Ottoman Empire against the Russian Empire.
- 5 November - Battle of Inkerman, Anglo-French forces defeat the Russians.
- 27 November - André-Adolphe-Eugène Disdéri patents a method of producing carte de visite photographs.
- Luxury goods brand Louis Vuitton is founded in Paris by Louis Vuitton.

== Births ==
- 29 April - Henri Poincaré, mathematician, theoretical physicist and philosopher of science (died 1912)
- 2 September - Paul Marie Eugène Vieille, chemist and gunsmith (died 1934)
- 6 September - Georges Picquart, army officer and Minister of War, exposed the truth in the Dreyfus Affair (died 1914)
- 20 October - Arthur Rimbaud, poet (died 1891)
- 5 November - Paul Sabatier, chemist, shared Nobel Prize in Chemistry in 1912 (died 1941)
- 17 November - Hubert Lyautey, Marshal of France (died 1934)

== Deaths ==
- 3 January - Adolphe Delattre, ornithologist (born 1805)
- 28 January - Jérôme-Adolphe Blanqui, economist (born 1798)
- 14 March - Louis Léon Jacob, admiral (born 1768)
- 5 July - Émile Souvestre, novelist (born 1806)
- 2 September - Pierre Alphonse Laurent, mathematician (born 1813)
- 7 September - Jacques-François Ancelot, dramatist (born 1794)
- 16 November - Marcellin Marbot, general (born 1782)
- 14 December - Léon Faucher, politician and economist (born 1803)
