= Bedside Manner =

Bedside manner describes how a healthcare professional interacts with patients in a doctor–patient relationship. Bedside manner commonly includes clinical empathy, reflecting an healthcare professional’s ability to understand and respond to a patient’s emotional and personal needs.

Bedside Manner may also refer to:

== Film and television ==
- Bedside Manner (film), a 1945 American film directed by Andrew L. Stone
- "Bedside Manner", a 1992 episode of The Adventures of the Black Stallion
- "Bedside Manner", a 1995 episode of The Bill
- "Bedside Manner", a 2016 episode of Bull
- "Bedside Manner", a 1994 episode of Saved by the Bell: The College Years
- "Bedside Manner", a 2014 episode of Scorned: Love Kills
- "Bedside Manners", a 2013 episode of Casualty

== Literature ==
- Bedside Manner, a 1989 novel by Jo Ann Algermissen
- "Bedside Manner", a short story by William Morrison in Great Science Fiction About Doctors

== Music ==
- "Bedside Manner", a song by Dawes from the album North Hills
- "Bedside Manner", a composition by John Scofield from the album Quiet

== Other uses ==
- "Bedside Manner", a track from the 1961 album Mike Nichols & Elaine May Examine Doctors
