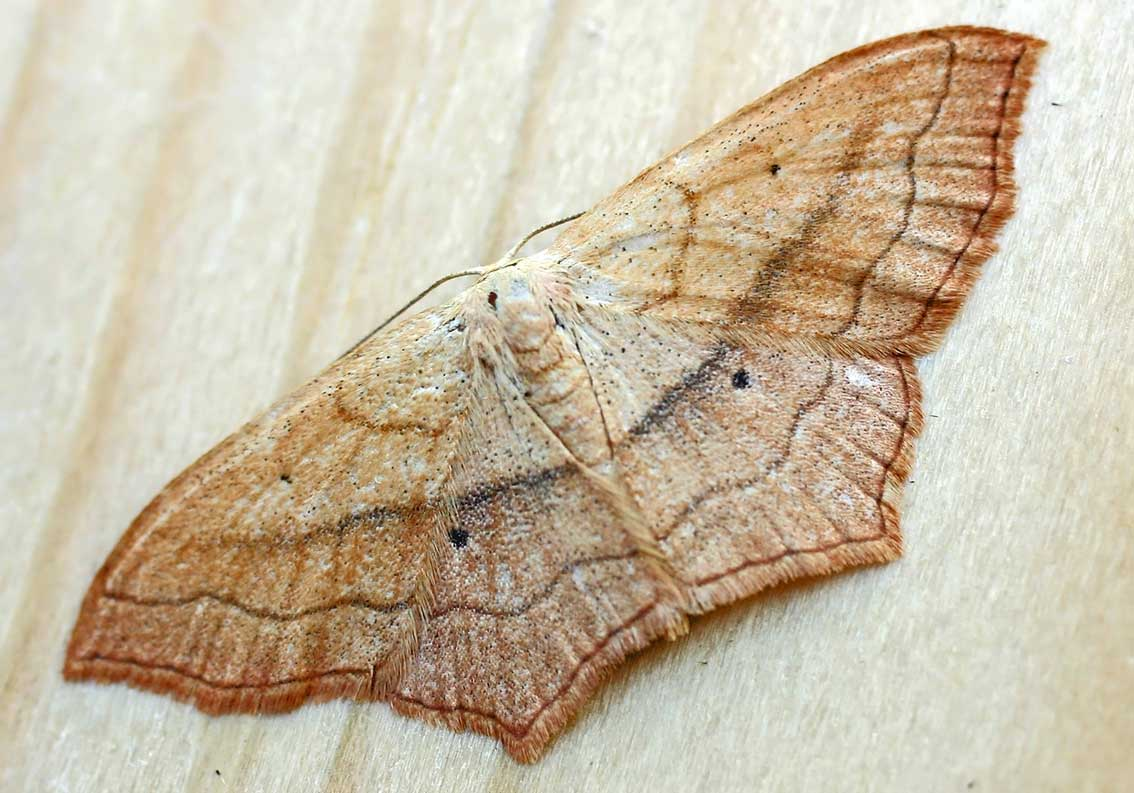

Scientific classification
- Kingdom: Animalia
- Phylum: Arthropoda
- Clade: Pancrustacea
- Class: Insecta
- Order: Lepidoptera
- Family: Geometridae
- Genus: Scopula
- Species: S. imitaria

Binomial name
- Scopula imitaria (Hübner, 1799)

Synonyms
- Geometra imitaria Hubner, 1799; Acidalia syriacaria Culot, 1918

= Scopula imitaria =

Species of geometer moth in subfamily Sterrhinae

Scopula imitaria, the small blood-vein, is a moth of the family Geometridae. It was first described by Jacob Hübner in 1799 and it is found throughout Europe and in North Africa.

== Description ==
The wingspan is 12–26 mm. (1st generation); the next generation is typically much smaller and reaches no more than 18 mm. The forewing leading edge (costa) forms an acute angle with the outer edge forming a sharp point. The hindwings also come to a sharp angle in the middle of the outer edge (a "tail"). The pattern and colouring are variable. The wings are reddish, yellowish or orange to light brown. The lines and marginal line are almost always clear, but fine. The median crossline is clearly developed and inclined slightly diagonally to the inner and outer crossline. It is slightly curved and very weakly wavy and often accompanied by a distal facing shadow. The interior and exterior crosslines are slightly wavy (more clearly than the median line). The hindwings have the pattern, however they often lack the inner crossline. The outer cross line shows a pointed bulge outwards, which follows the "tail" of the perimeter. Discal flecks are only sometimes present or weak, They are more pronounced on the hindwing. The discal fleck of the hindwings sits on the outside of the medium line or in the "shadow". On the forewing it is basal to the median line.

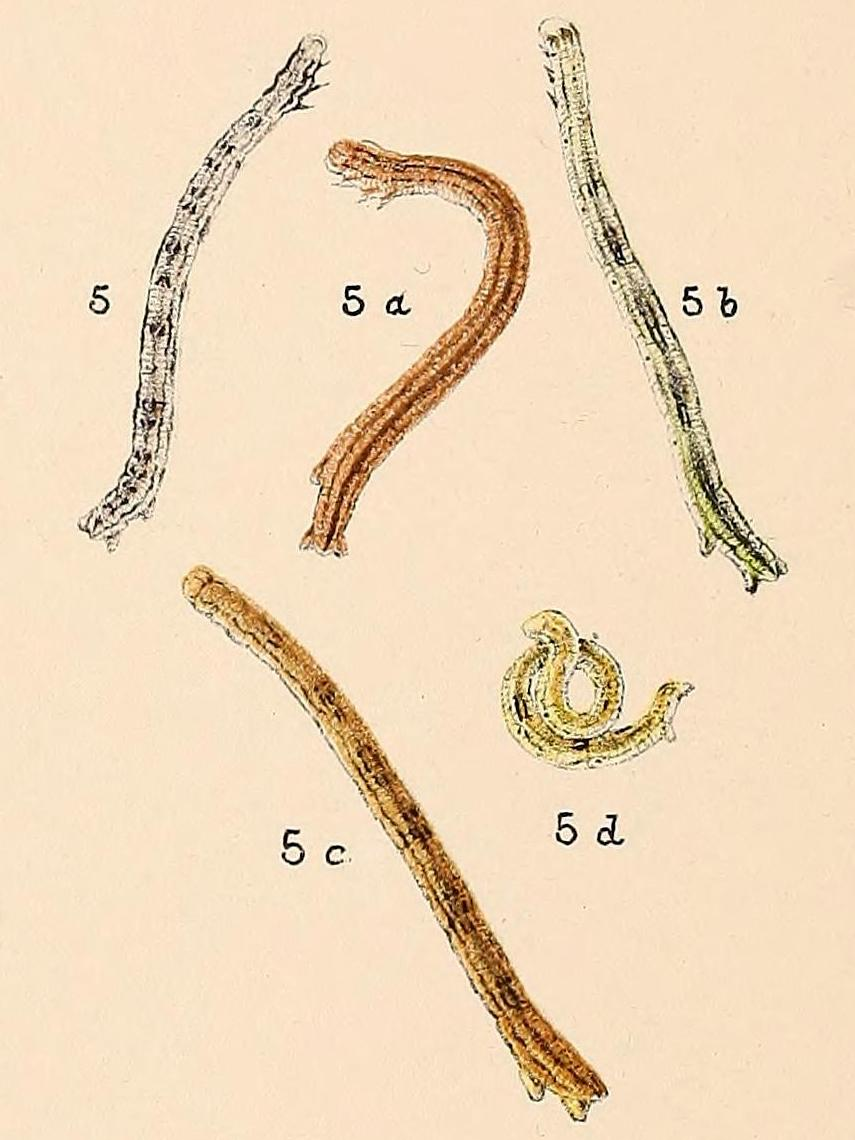
Larvae in various stages

The egg is elongate-ovate, strongly flattened at its broader end, with the longitudinal ribbing strong, its colouration is whitish yellow, becoming orange as in the allied species. The larva is extremely long and slender, the skin transversely and very irregularly wrinkled. The head is small and rounded. The body is pale ochreous with a distinct brown dorsal line, often partly broken up into spots anteriorly, but becoming darker and more continuous posteriorly; ventral surface mixed with fuscous. The spiracles are black. Varieties occur in which the ground-colour is more grey, or more tinged with greenish or with red-brown, but it is always of some pale shade. The pupa is golden brown, with ochreous yellow wing-cases.

== Distribution ==
The species is mostly southern European (from Portugal to the Balkan Peninsula and Greece) as well as North African (from Morocco to Libya). It ranges in the east to Asia Minor and Syria. It also occurs in almost the whole of France to the south of the British Isles and Denmark. Also specimens have been caught in southern Germany. There are small, isolated occurrences in western Ukraine. In Germany, there are but so far no secure evidence of an indigenous population. In the Middle East, in southern Turkey, Cyprus, Crete and the Greek islands of the south-east, the nominate S. i. imitaria is replaced by S. i. syriaca Culot, 1918. This form is less clearly has a little less corrugated outer cross line and a less clearly pronounced marginal line. The colour is slightly reddish. The reddish yellow form S. i. syriaca occurs especially on hot, dry areas in the lowlands and hills. It is widespread in the Mediterranean region on sandy or stony soil, the maquis shrubland, evergreen oak forests, olive groves and rocky grassland. In the Alps, S. i. imitaria rises up to 900 m. In Morocco and also in the Mediterranean region it rises up to a height of 1,400 meters. S. i. imitaria is limited to the coastal areas in western France and southern England.

The moth flies in two generations from June to September in western Europe.

The larvae feed on various forms of privet.

== Subspecies ==
- Scopula imitaria imitaria
- Scopula imitaria syriacaria (Culot 1918)

== Sources ==
- Seitz, Adalbert (1912). The Macrolepidoptera of the World; a Systematic Description of the Hitherto Known Macrolepidoptera.
