= Claude-Henri Chouard =

French surgeon

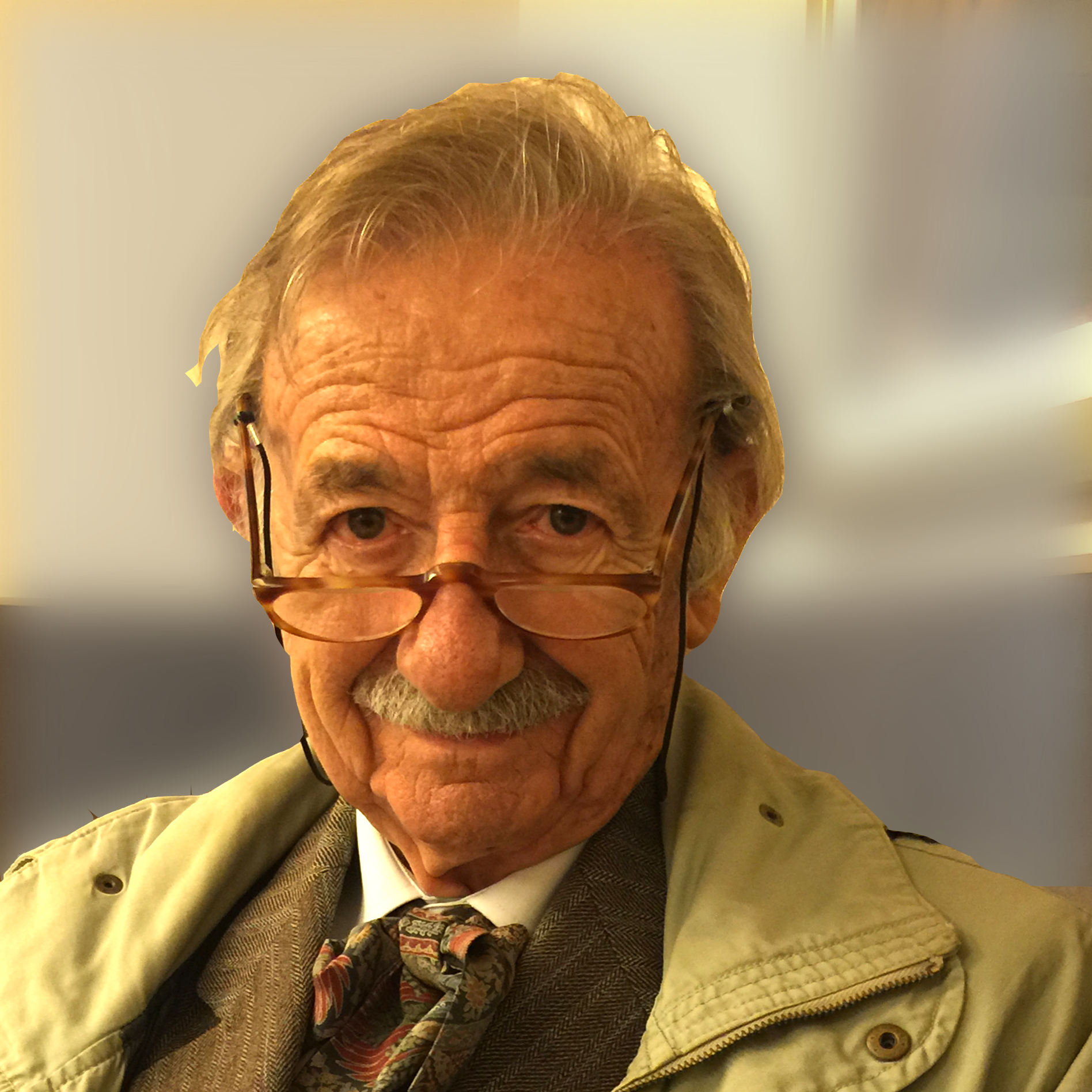
- Claude-Henri Chouard in 2015
- Born: 3 July 1931 (age 94); Paris, France
- Known for: Work on cochlear implant
- Awards: Légion d'honneur
- Scientific career
- Fields: Surgery, Otology
- Institutions: University of Paris

Claude-Henri Chouard (born 3 July 1931) is a French surgeon. An otologist, he has been a full member of the Académie Nationale de Médecine (French National Academy of Medicine) since 1999. He was director of the AP-HP (Paris hospital group) Laboratory of Auditory Prosthesis and director of the ENT Research Laboratory at Paris-Saint-Antoine University Hospital from 1967 to 2001. He was also head of the institution's ENT Department from 1978 to 1998. In 1982, he was elected a member of the International Collegium ORL-AS. He achieved worldwide recognition in the late 1970s thanks to the work completed by his Paris laboratory's multidisciplinary team on the multichannel cochlear implant. This implanted electronic hearing device was developed at Saint-Antoine and alleviates bilateral total deafness. When implanted early in young children, it can also help overcome the spoken language problems associated with deafness.

== Biography ==
Claude-Henri Chouard comes from a long line of academics and doctors. His father, Pierre Chouard (1903–1983), was Professor of Plant Physiology at the Sorbonne, and founder and director of the Gif-sur-Yvette Phytotron. He was a Lay Dominican and for many years President of the International Society of St Vincent de Paul. His grandfather, Jules Chouard, was a journalist and a writer. His great grandfather, Martin-Jules Chouard, was a primary school teacher and a painter. His mother, Denise Petit-Dutaillis, was the daughter of Dr Paul Petit-Dutaillis, a navy surgeon and, later, a gynaecologist at Saint Michel Hospital, Paris. His mother's uncle was Professor Charles Petit-Dutaillis, a member of the Académie des Inscriptions et Belles-Lettres and president of the Institut de France. Her brother was Professor Daniel Petit-Dutaillis, a neurosurgeon at Pitié Salpêtrière Hospital and a member of the Académie Nationale de Médecine. Claude-Henri Chouard married Isabelle, the elder daughter of the four girls of Pierre Sainflou (1917–2007) Polytechnitien, X- 37, scientific film-maker: they had 4 children.

=== Training ===
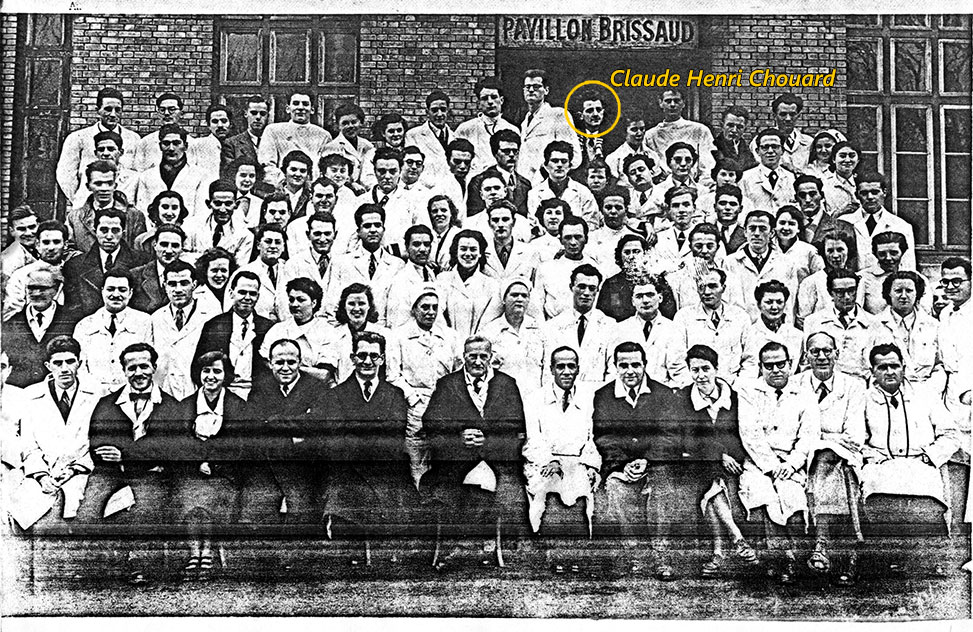
Claude Henri Chouard first year of Medicine Faculty (1950)

Claude-Henri Chouard initially trained under neurologist Raymond Garcin and neuropsychiatrist Noël Peron, at Salpêtrière Hospital, before spending 30 months doing military service in Algeria. He then completed his internship in the Paris hospital system, under Henri Guénin and Daniel Morel-Fatio, and later Paul Pialoux and Maurice Aubry, who were ENT specialists and members of the Académie de Médecine. During his internship, he also studied politics and management at Sciences Po from Paris and completed research in neuroanatomy at André Delmas' laboratory, with Charles Eyriès. For over half a century, Claude-Henri Chouard's passion has been the complex relationship between doctor and patient: this passion has been at the heart of all his clinical training and is the reason he has never stopped practising.

== Scientific contributions ==
Claude-Henri Chouard has made personal contributions to all three fields in which he has worked. The first two fields have often required him to draw on his surgical experience and clinical empathy.

=== The multichannel cochlear implant ===
The multichannel cochlear implant was designed and developed in 1975 at Saint-Antoine Hospital by a multidisciplinary team formed by Patrick MacLeod and Claude-Henri Chouard for this very purpose. For over eight years, these researchers were well ahead of all the other international teams, until the collapse of French company Bertin temporarily put paid to their progress. However, the core principles established by the researchers in the patents taken out by Bertin Technologies in 1977 are still used by today's manufacturers of multichannel implanted auditory prostheses, both intracochlear and auditory brain stem.

In 1957, in Paris, André Djourno, a professor of medical physics, and Charles Eyriès, a Parisian otologist, restored basic hearing to a completely deaf patient with bilateral cholesteatoma by electrically stimulating acoustic nerve fibres still present in the inner ear.

Although this system—which was further developed several years later by William House in Los Angeles—represented huge progress in that it freed patients from the silence and isolation in which they were trapped as a result of total deafness, the device never managed to enable patients to identify words without lip reading. After twelve years of trials, the researchers all agreed on one thing: to achieve the level of performance required to give these patients a comfortable social life, the cochlear implant would need several electrodes, so it could stimulate the different frequency regions on the "cochlear keyboard", which were identified by 1961 Nobel Prize winner Georg von Békésy. However, all the researchers hesitated in moving forward, fearful of failure and major complications.

In 1973, after closely studying the tentative results achieved thus far, C.H. Chouard and Dr P. MacLeod, who had completed their medical training together, decided to tackle the problem. P. MacLeod was by now a researcher specialising in sensory physiology, while C.H. Chouard had personal experience of performing surgery on the facial and vestibular nerves. They decided to combine these skills and form a multidisciplinary team within the ENT Research Laboratory at Saint-Antoine University Hospital in Paris. In 1975, they performed a fully ethical study on three patients with recent traumatic unilateral total deafness and total facial paralysis, which required surgery. The study showed that selective electrical stimulation of eight to twelve electrodes, each isolated from the others, placed in different locations within the tympanic duct of the cochlear, resulted in the perception of different frequencies.

Then, after developing a round window electrical stimulation test to confirm the presence of functional auditory fibres, the Paris-based team applied the electrode implantation technique to five patients with historic bilateral total deafness. Following the surgery, and after undergoing relatively brief speech therapy, all the patients—who were totally deaf—were able to recognise a varying percentage of words without lip reading. French company Bertin was then selected to manufacture a functional implantable device, under the scientific direction of P. MacLeod. The table-top device was built quickly, but the untimely death of Jean Bertin at the end of 1975 resulted in the company being restructured, and the French researchers had to wait until summer 1976 to finally receive the first six devices.

The first implant was fitted at Saint-Antoine Hospital on Wednesday 22 September 1976, by C.H. Chouard, assisted by Bernard Meyer. The first patient's hearing returned the following day, and the five other patients soon underwent surgery. Bertin filed patent no. 77/07824 on 16 March 1977. It was based on MacLeod's physiological criteria and made two simultaneous claims:

- - The sequential transmission to the cochlea of an indeterminate number of frequency bands
- - The transmission of all audible sound information.

The first results were presented the following day at the eleventh ENT World Congress in Buenos Aires, and published shortly afterwards.

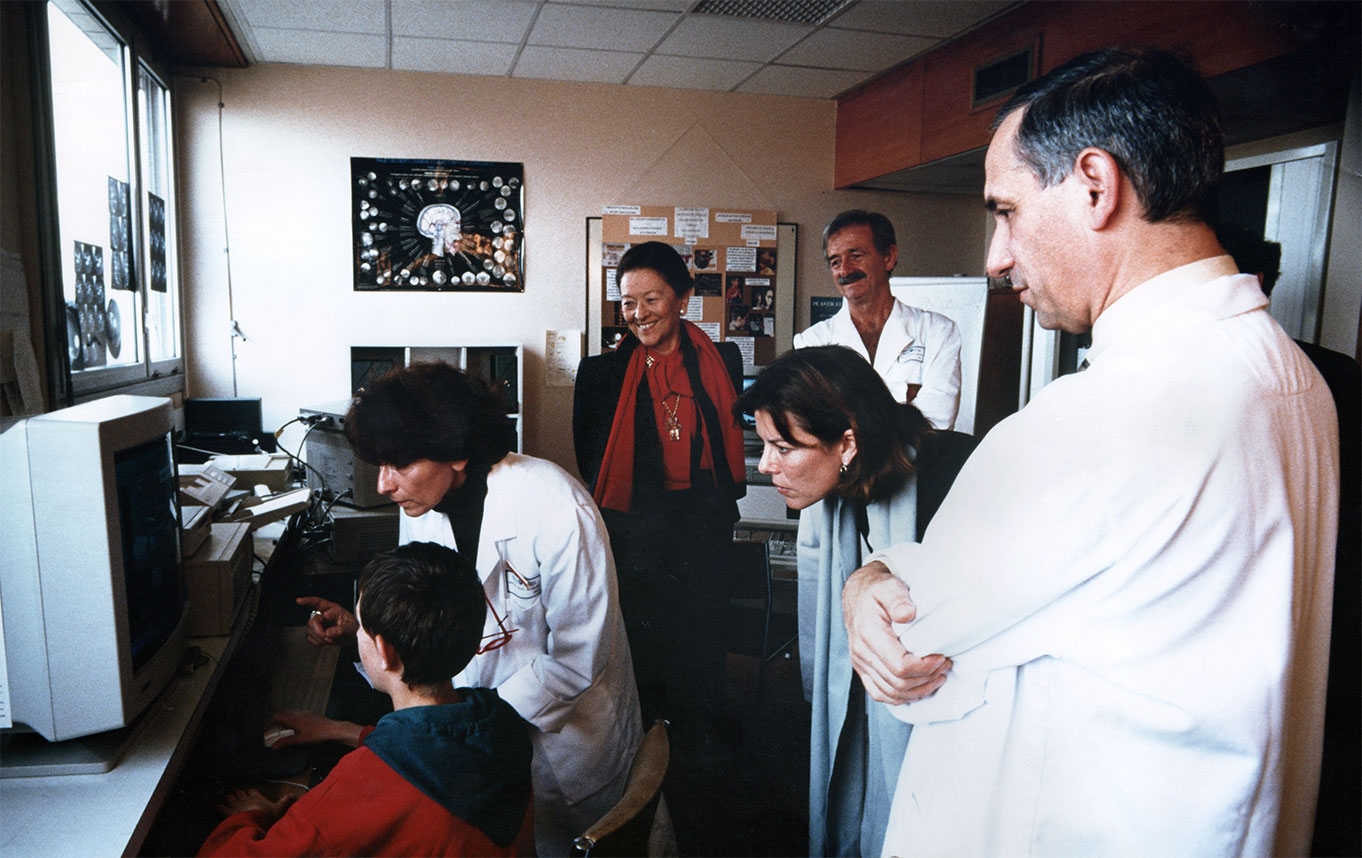
Claude Henri Chouard (center), Bernard Meyer (right) and Caroline de Monaco at St Antoine Hospital (1993)

For nearly twenty years, this document influenced all the procedures used and research undertaken by other international teams, who were obliged to find ways around the claims—usually by transmitting only part of the speech information—until the patent fell into the public domain in 1997.

In 1982, at a meeting organised by the New York Academy of Sciences to review the multichannel cochlear implant, Chouard and his team presented results obtained from 48 patients (45 of whom had received an implant over one year previously) . Their paper also detailed multiple innovations designed to improve rehabilitation and enable the implant to adapt to the specific characteristics of any remaining auditory fibres. These procedures were later adopted by all the other international teams. The results presented by all the other teams during the conference related to just less than ten patients (based on the total number of deaf patients treated with a multichannel system).

Also in 1982, Claude-Henri Chouard used Born's reconstruction technique, which he had employed twenty years earlier during his neuro-anatomical research with C. Eyriès (see below), to demonstrate—initially in animals—that the device needs to be implanted as early as possible, in order to avoid atrophy of the central auditory structures. His observations clearly show that this phenomenon occurs very quickly in cases of persistent neonatal deafness.

A few years later, after multiple delays to the delivery of the fully digital device that MacLeod and Chouard had been requesting since 1980, Bertin abandoned the implant and, in 1987, sold the licence to another French company: MXM-Neurelec.

Meanwhile, as Bertin's apparent disinterest in the French device resulted in slow progress, the American Blake S. Wilson came up with a sound signal processing strategy directly inspired by the French researchers' work and patent, although the author never made reference to this in any of his subsequent publications. Since early 2014, several corrections, have been published to address this surprising oversight, referring notably to numerous previous works by the Parisian team.

In 1991, MXM-Neurelec presented its first multichannel implant. It was fully digitised and could be adapted to ossified cochleas. The implant was based on the Bertin licence, but its development was very closely guided by suggestions from researchers at the Saint-Antoine ENT Research Laboratory in Paris.

From 1992 onwards, the multichannel cochlear implant gradually gained acceptance in France.

Today, in 2015, most of the principles established by Claude-Henri Chouard and Patrick MacLeod's team between 1976 and 1977 are still used by all manufacturers of cochlear implants and auditory brain stem implants.

=== Snoring and obstructive sleep apnoea ===
Between 1984 and 1990, encouraged by his assistants Prof. Bernard Meyer and Fréderic Chabolle, and with the help of pulmonologist Prof. Bernard Fleury and cardiologist Prof. Jean Valty of Saint-Antoine Hospital, Claude-Henri Chouard began studying the symptomatology and epidemiology of the complications of a new disease in the field of ENT. He named this disease chronic rhonchopathy. The main symptom is snoring, which no one had previously viewed as a relevant sign of disease. In fact, the louder the snoring, the greater the risk that it is associated with severe obstructive sleep apnoea. After laying the foundations for treatment development with his students, Claude-Henri Chouard ceased to be personally involved in this area of research, leaving the youngest members of his team to continue enhancing our knowledge of this new disease and perfecting the corresponding treatments.

=== Neuroanatomy ===
During the mid-twentieth century, Charles Eyriès was a researcher in the anatomy laboratory run by Prof. André Delmas, spending his mornings as an ENT surgeon and his afternoons as a neuroanatomist. Claude-Henri Chouard was one of his students between 1960 and 1966. Eyriès taught him Born's method for 3D reconstruction of histological sections at a magnification of 100 and 150. This technique was to prove useful twenty years later, when Chouard showed that children with neonatal deafness need to receive implants as early as possible, before the auditory brain structures begin to atrophy 5. Chouard became familiar with total deafness very early on in his career, since he had direct access to information on the famous electro-therapeutic trials performed by Eyriès in 1957 with André Djourno.

Claude-Henri Chouard also identified the functional origins of acoustico-facial anastomoses by following the reconstructed nerve fibres from one end to the other. This helped explain the effectiveness of certain treatments for Menière's disease and revealed the route taken by efferent fibres in the inner ear.

By using the same approach to reconstruct the solitary tract and its gustatory nuclei, he observed that the nucleus of the last brachial nerve, the pneumogastric nerve, extended a long way down, undoubtedly causing afferent sensitivity of the enteric and airway pathways. This hypothesis has been the electro-physiological existence of which was recently demonstrated within the intestines, and which could potentially play a role in certain forms of diabetes.

== Academic Work ==
- L’aide au geste chirurgical par les navigateurs et les robots. (Rapport avec F. Dubois)
- Le retentissement du fonctionnement des éoliennes sur la santé de l'homme
- Le bruit dans la ville.
- Compétence scientifique et technique de l’expert et qualité de l’expertise en responsabilité médicale (avec Jacques Hureau) 2011
- Nanosciences et médecine (Rapport avec E. Cabanis, J. Chambron et E. Milgrom.)

== Popular Medical Book ==
- La grande peur du cancer, Mercure de France Édit. Paris, 1971, 175 p
- L’euthanasie en procès, La Pensée Universelle Édit. Paris, 1973, p.
- Entendre Sans Oreille; Robert Laffont Édit. Paris, 1978, 210 p
- Vaincre le Ronflement et retrouver la forme; Ramsay Garamont Édit. Paris, 1986, 223 p.
- Vaincre le Ronflement et retrouver la forme;2° édition, Éditions du Rocher Édit. Paris, 1993, 187 p.
- Vaincre la Surdité : progrès et promesses. Éditions du Rocher Édit. 1995, 277 p.
- L’oreille musicienne : les chemins de la musique de l’oreille au cerveau. Gallimard Édit. Paris, 2001, 347 p., 2° édit-Folio 2011

== Hobbies ==
For Claude-Henri Chouard, writing and art are both cultural activities in their own right and an extension of his scientific work, evidence of his convictions around doctors' role in society (see, for example, his popular medical books). Writing

== Painting ==
He is also passionate about the visual arts, to which he was introduced at a young age, via the paintings of his great grandfather, Martin-Jules Chouard. From the age of 13, Claude-Henri Chouard was an amateur artist, working with a variety of media, including photography, and later incorporated film and television into his medical teaching. He exhibited his work regularly from 1982 onwards. He has been a member of the French Society of Independent Artists since 1986 and was elected recording secretary in 2009 and first vice president in March 2012, remaining in the position until November 2014. Two of his works are held by Musée Miramion de l’Assistance Publique in Paris and evoke the transcendent nature of surgery.

== Honours and awards ==
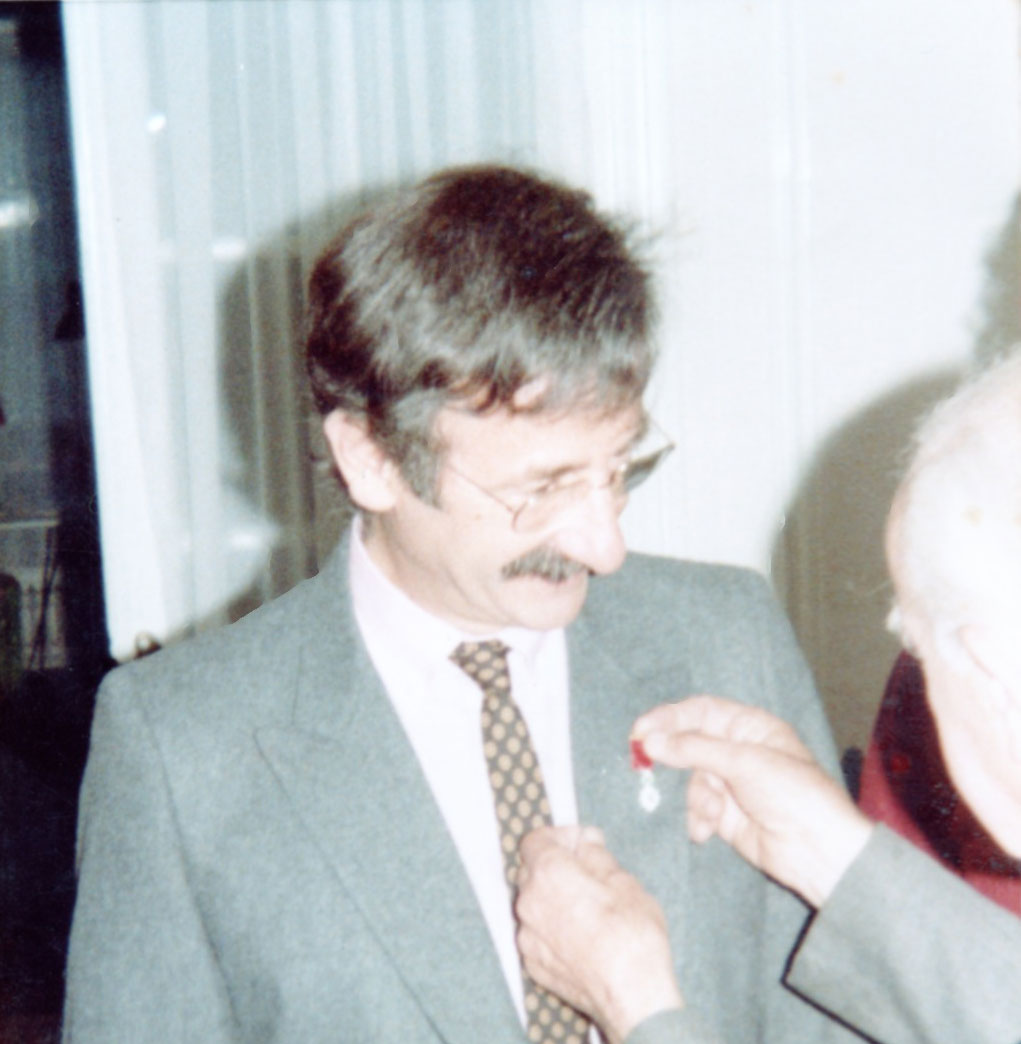
Claude Henri Chouard : Officier of the Légion d’Honneur (1980)

Officier of Legion of Honour
