= 1852 in France =

- Decades: 1830s; 1840s; 1850s; 1860s; 1870s
- See also: History of France; Timeline of French history; List of years in France

Events from the year 1852 in France.

== Incumbents ==
- Monarch – Napoleon III (from December 2, monarchy established)

== Events ==
- 14 January - French Constitution of 1852 enacted by Charles Louis Napoléon Bonaparte (Napoleon III).
- 29 February - Legislative Election held.
- 14 March - Legislative Election held.
- 1 May - Covered market in Nancy is opened to the public.
- 24 September - Engineer Henri Giffard makes the first airship trip from Paris to Trappes.
- 21 November - New French Empire confirmed by referendum.
- 2 December - Napoleon III becomes Emperor of the French.

== Births ==
- 26 January - Pierre Savorgnan de Brazza, explorer (died 1905)
- 1 March - Théophile Delcassé, statesman (died 1923)
- 28 September - Henri Moissan, chemist, Nobel Prize laureate (died 1907)
- 22 November - Paul-Henri-Benjamin d'Estournelles de Constant, diplomat and politician, recipient of the Nobel Peace Prize (died 1924)
- 15 December - Henri Becquerel, physicist, Nobel Prize laureate (died 1908)

== Deaths ==
- 6 January - Louis Braille, teacher, inventor of braille (born 1809)
- 26 February - Hélène Jégado, domestic servant and serial killer, executed (born 1803)
- 17 April - Étienne Maurice Gérard, general and statesman (born 1773)
- 28 May - Eugène Burnouf, orientalist (born 1801)
- 22 July - Auguste de Marmont, general, nobleman and marshal (born 1774)
- 26 July - Jean-Jacques Feuchère, sculptor (born 1807)

=== Full date unknown ===
- Jacques Bernard Hombron, naval surgeon and naturalist (born 1798)
