= Cécile Guillame =

French artist (1933–2004)

- Born: 18 July 1933; Chassey-les-Montbozon, France
- Died: 4 August 2004 (aged 71)
- Occupation: Engraver

Cécile Guillame (18 July 1933 in Chassey-les-Montbozon – 4 August 2004) was the first woman who engraved French postal stamps.

During the 1950s, she studied at the École des Beaux-Arts of Nancy and Paris where she chose the art of engraving.

The first issued stamp she engraved was for Monaco in 1967 and represented a Cooper-Climax car that won the Grand Prix of Monaco. It was originally designed by Pierrette Lambert. Her first stamp for France was issued in 1973 and represented the Clos Lucé in Amboise.

When she retired in 1993, she had engraved or designed more than three hundred stamps for France, French post offices in Andorra, Monaco, and French Overseas territories, as well as some African French-speaking countries.

Cécile Guillame also created print and ceramics.
