= Françoise Garner =

French soprano (1933–2024)

- Garner in the 1970s
- Born: 17 October 1933; Lot-et-Garonne, France
- Died: 6 March 2024 (aged 90); Nîmes, France
- Occupation: Operatic soprano
- Organizations: Opéra-Comique

Françoise Garner (17 October 1933 – 6 March 2024) was a French soprano who made an international career. She began as a coloratura soprano at the Opéra-Comique, in roles such as Lakmé of Delibes and Leïla in Bizet's Les pêcheurs de perles. She appeared from the nineteen-seventies at leading opera houses of Europe, more in lyric soprano roles such as Liù in Puccini's Turandot and Leonora in Verdi's Il trovatore. She performed as Gounod's Marguerite at La Scala and as his Juliette in the Verona Arena, but was also trained in Rome, one of few French singers who knew bel canto.

== Life and career ==
Garner was born in Nérac, Lot-et-Garonne, on 17 October 1933. Her maternal grandparents were merchants there. Her family left for Paris when she was five, but she regularly returned for vacation until age of twenty. During the summers there, she attended operas at the Théâtre de Verdure de La Garenne. She first studied musicology at the Conservatoire de Paris with Marcel Samuel-Rousseau. After her voice was discovered, she focused on singing. She studied further at the Accademia Nazionale di Santa Cecilia of Rome with Rachele Maragliano-Mori, later at the Mozarteum in Salzburg with Rudolf Baumgartner. She finished studies with Abrami in Milan.

Garner made her debut at the Opéra-Comique in 1963 in the world premiere of Menotti's The Last Savage. Other roles there included Rosina in Rossini's Il barbiere di Siviglia, the title role in Lakmé, Olympia in Offenbach's Les contes d'Hoffmann, and Leïla in Les pêcheurs de perles. At the Paris Opéra, she performed the title role in Donizetti's Lucia di Lammermoor and Gilda in Verdi's Rigoletto, later as Countess Adèle in Rossini's Le comte Ory in 1976, and in various roles in Ravel's L'enfant et les sortilèges, staged by Jorge Lavelli in 1979. In 1971, she appeared as the Queen of the Night in Mozart's Die Zauberflöte, at the Aix-en-Provence Festival.

She made an international career beginning in the nineteen-seventies; she appeared as Marguerite in Gounod's Faust at La Scala in 1977, directed by Jean-Louis Barrault and conducted by Georges Prêtre. She performed at the Grand Théâtre de Genève in 1980, as Donizetti's Anna Bolena at the Liceu in Barcelona in 1982, and in Teatro Carlo Felice in Genoa in 1983. She appeared as Bellini's Norma at the Opéra Royal de Wallonie in 1984 and performed the role of Salomé in Massenet's Hérodiade at the 1987 Orange Festival.

She appeared at the Metropolitan Opera as Konstanze in Mozart's Die Entführung aus dem Serail in 1984 (in John Dexter's production) and as Elvira in Bellini's I puritani in 1986. She appeared as Norma at the Sydney Opera, and in Gounod's Roméo et Juliette and Puccini's Madama Butterfly in the Verona Arena.

A coloratura soprano at first, she developed to a lyric soprano with roles such as Verdi's La traviata and Leonora in Il trovatore, and Liù in Puccini's Turandot, and to more dramatic roles such as Puccini's Tosca. Garner remained a presence in leading roles at French regional theatres. She recorded the title role of Norma in 1992.

Garner lived in Nîmes after she retired from the stage. She died there on 6 March 2024, at the age of 90.
