= Raymond Gayrard =

French sculptor

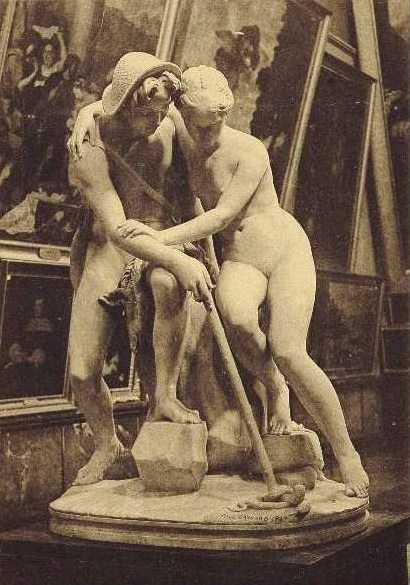
Daphnis and Chloe by Raymond Gayrard, Musée des Beaux-Arts de Caen

Paul Joseph Raymond Gayrard (3 September 1807 – 22 July 1855) was a French sculptor. He was born in Clermont-Ferrand, France.

He studied at an early age under his sculptor/engraver father Raymond Gayrard, and was a student of François Rude as well as David d'Angers.

Gayrard first exhibited his works at the Salon of 1827 and continued to submit works throughout his lifetime winning a Second class medal iat the Salon of 1834 and a First Class Medal in the Salon of 1846 and Salon of 1848. His last recorded exhibit was in 1855. He was very successful among the more wealthy of French high society and executed many busts of the more notables of the day, but had a considerable talent for animal modeling. His known bronze animal models date from the years 1846 until 1848 with his powerful plaster of a 'Harness Horse' exhibited at the Salon of 1847 and submitted again in 1848 in bronze. Also in 1848 his bronze of a 'Reclining Deerhound', thought to be first viewed when in plaster at the Salon in 1846, was particularly striking. One of his other animals groups titled 'The Monkey Steeplechase' is a rather humorous and whimsical subject done in a similar vain to Christophe Fratin's bronzes of humanized animals.

His monumental works include the four evangelists for the Sainte Clotide Basilica in Paris.
