= Jules Auguste Lemire =

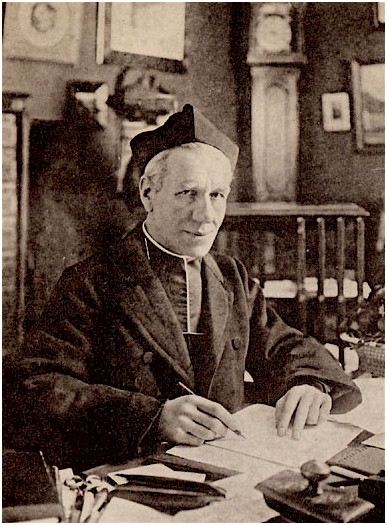
Jules Auguste Lemire

Jules Auguste Lemire (April 23, 1853 – March 7, 1928), French priest and social reformer, was born at Vieux-Berquin (Nord).

== Life ==
He was educated at the college of St Francis of Assisi, Hazebrouck, where he subsequently taught philosophy and rhetoric. In 1897 he was elected deputy for Hazebrouck and was returned unopposed at the elections of 1898, 1902 and 1906.

He organized a society called La Ligue française du coin de terre et du foyer, the object of which was to secure, at the expense of the state, a piece of land for every French family desirous of possessing one. The abbé Lemire sat in the chamber of deputies as a conservative republican and Christian Socialist.

He protested in 1893 against the action of the Dupuy cabinet in closing the Bourses du Travail, characterizing it as the expression of a policy of disdain of the workers. In December 1893 he was seriously injured by the bomb thrown by the anarchist Vaillant from the gallery of the chamber.
