= 1930 in France =

- Decades: 1910s; 1920s; 1930s; 1940s; 1950s
- See also: History of France; Timeline of French history; List of years in France

Events from the year 1930 in France.

== Incumbents ==
- President: Gaston Doumergue
- President of the Council of Ministers:
  - until 21 February: André Tardieu
  - 21 February-2 March: Camille Chautemps
  - 2 March-13 December: André Tardieu
  - starting 13 December: Théodore Steeg

== Events ==
- 10 February – Yen Bai mutiny takes place, an uprising by Vietnamese soldiers in the French colonial army's garrison in Yen Bai.
- 22 April – London Naval Treaty is agreed between United Kingdom, Japan, France, Italy and the United States.
- 17 May – Prime Minister André Tardieu decides to withdraw the remaining French troops from the Rhineland. They depart by 30 June.
- 21 June – One-year conscription comes into force in France.
- 7 September – Marcel Cachin launches the first Fête de l'Humanité in Bezons
- 5 October – British Airship R101 crashes in France en route to India on its maiden voyage.

== Sport ==
- 2 July – Tour de France begins.
- 13 July – The first Football World Cup starts: Lucien Laurent scores the first goal, for France against Mexico.
- 27 July – Tour de France ends, won by André Leducq.

== Births ==
=== January to June ===
- 1 January – Jean-Pierre Duprey, poet and sculptor (died 1959)
- 13 January – Françoise Prévost, actress (died 1997)
- 3 February – Roger Duchêne, biographer (died 2006)
- 20 February – Pierre Gabaye, composer (died 2000)
- 1 March – Pierre Max Dubois, composer (died 1995)
- 6 March – Lorin Maazel, conductor, violinist and composer (died 2014)
- 10 April – Claude Bolling, jazz pianist, composer and arranger (died 2020)
- 14 April – René Desmaison, mountaineer, climber and alpinist (died 2007)
- 29 April – Jean Rochefort, actor (died 2017)
- 30 April – Félix Guattari, militant, institutional psychotherapist and philosopher (died 1992)
- 25 May – Sonia Rykiel, fashion designer (died 2016)
- 9 June – Monique Serf, singer (died 1997)
- 24 June
  - Pierre Restany, art critic and cultural philosopher (died 2003)
  - Claude Chabrol, film director and cinema critic (died 2010)

=== July to December ===
- 15 July – Jacques Derrida, philosopher (died 2004)
- 23 July – Pierre Vidal-Naquet, historian (died 2006)
- 1 August – Pierre Bourdieu, sociologist (died 2002)
- 17 August – Jean Bourlès, cyclist (died 2021)
- 24 September – Catherine Robbe-Grillet, actress, writer, photographer and dominatrix
- 1 October – Philippe Noiret, actor (died 2006)
- 5 October – Raymond Guiot, flautist and composer (died 2025)
- 10 October – Yves Chauvin, chemist, recipient of 2005 Nobel Prize in Chemistry (died 2015)
- 18 October – Michel Drach, film director, writer, film producer and actor (died 1990)
- 29 October – Niki de Saint Phalle, sculptor, painter and filmmaker (died 2002)
- 13 November
  - Michel Robin, actor (died 2020)
  - René-Samuel Sirat, rabbi (died 2023)
- 14 November – Pierre Bergé, entrepreneur (died 2017)
- 3 December – Jean-Luc Godard, film director (died 2022)
- 4 December – René Privat, cyclist (died 1995)
- 11 December – Jean-Louis Trintignant, actor (died 2022)
- 15 December – Henri B. Kagan, chemist, recipient of 2026 Nobel Prize in Chemistry

=== Full date unknown ===
- Gérard Granel, philosopher and translator (died 2000)

== Deaths ==
- 19 March – Joseph Dupont, missionary and bishop (b. 1850)
- 24 October
  - Paul Émile Appell, mathematician (born 1855)
  - Eugène Gley, physiologist and endocrinologist (born 1857)
- 24 November – Prosper-René Blondlot, physicist (born 1849)
- 22 December – Marion Manville Pope, American author (born 1859)

== See also ==
- List of French films of 1930
