= Archiguille =

French painter

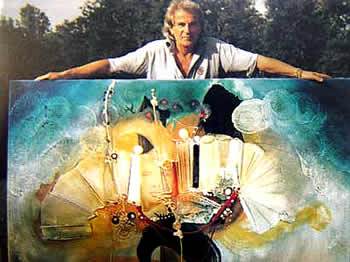
Archiguille, French painter, Inventor of the Transfiguration.

Augustin François Guille, called Archiguille (born in Alès May 17, 1932 - August 30, 2017) was a French painter.

== Life and work ==
Archiguille was born in Alès. He spent his childhood in Vendargues in the south of France during World War II under German occupation. Drawn to painting as a means of expression, he began when at school to be fascinated with the letters of the alphabet, which led in turn to forays into the oriental art of calligraphy. 1946-48 he attended the Arts and Crafts Educational Centre, Saint Jodard, Loire. In 1952 he arrived in Paris and worked at the Stamp Atelier. In 1956 he met Georges Braque. In 1957 he had his first sales with Lyrical abstraction work (a synthesis of cubism and fauvism). In 1958 he attended a course by Professor Lemagny, (Prize of Rome for painting), Fine Arts Academy.

Archiguille's first exhibition took place in 1953 at "La Librairie de l'Institut" in Paris. It showcased his passion for calligraphy with drawings of letters and spots of colors on cardboards. It was not well received at the time and turned out to be unsuccessful.

His meeting with Georges Braque in 1956 who advised him to further develop his painting skills and master a wider range of techniques was pivotal for his career's evolution. Without having a thorough grasp of figurative painting, said Braque: "you will never fully learn how to feel your art from deep within". Upon taking his advice, François Guille who was not yet called Archiguille met with Professor Lemagny (Fine Arts Academy) and refined his painting techniques under his tutelage for about two years learning to perfect his craft giving emphasis on drawings of nature and landscapes in the figurative style.

Archiguille's first canvases were much influenced by his friend Maurice Utrillo. In 1965, he held his second exposition at the Bernheim-Jeune gallery in Paris and a first success for Archiguille. His "Transfiguration" technique and avant-garde style was the theme of the art show. In 1969, he held an exhibition at the "Palais de la Radio" with the participation of Hans Hartung who was his teacher until 1968. Archiguille also admired the sensitivity with which Peter Paul Rubens and Jan Vermeer rendered effects of light. He was much influenced by Hartung and Braque who compelled him to figurative painting in order to develop a deeper inner grasp of his art.

« Antiquity, Renaissance, Impressionism, Fauvism, Expressionism… Archiguille has seen it all, has tried it all, has learned from it all. From each school, he's caught the savoir-faire and the spirit. It is from this amazing pictorial culture that he has drawn the essence of his work. It is from that universal history that was issued an entirely personal creation which he termed: "Transfiguration".» In the year 1958-1967 Archiguille founded the school of Transfiguration in Chicago named after the transfigurative movement he started in the mid-1960s. "Archiguille belongs to the celebrated creators of the 1950s who in that troubled time showed their bright expressive works characterized by new composition and plastic innovations. The use of "transfigurations" made it possible for Archiguille to find his place in fine arts."

« From Jean Cocteau to Françoise Sagan, to Henri Michaux to Jack Lang, artists, writers, poets have acknowledged Archiguille's fine art. In 1968, André Malraux announced him as "the most gifted painter of his generation". His art works can be found in collections of François Mitterrand, Mme Claude Pompidou, Jacqueline Kennedy, Coco Chanel, Ari Onassis, Barbara Bush, the Emperor of Japan, Sophia Loren, Robert De Niro, Spain's king Juan Carlos, David Rockefeller and Barbra Streisand just to name a few.» His paintings grace some of the most prestigious museums of contemporary art in the world: Paris, New York, Chicago, Houston and Tokyo as well as the Bernheim Jeune-Gallery in Paris, Princeton University, Club 13 and the Parisian Tuileries. "The dynamic personality of François Archiguille has been well documented by Françoise Sagan" (1935–2004, French premier writer and intellectual).

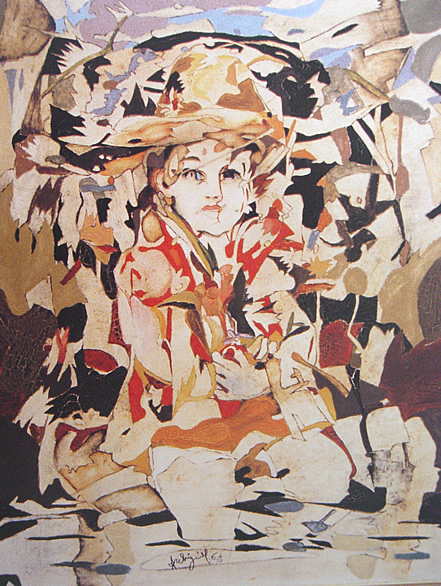
Child, 1963, (100*81 cm, Oil on canvas)

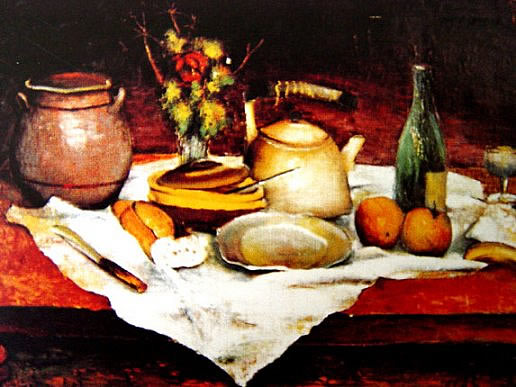
Nature Morte, 1958 (60*80 cm, Oil on canvas)

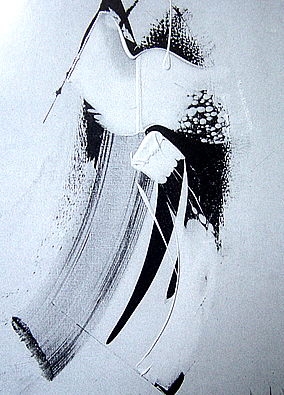
Noir et blanc, 1968 (130*97 cm, Acrylic on canvas)

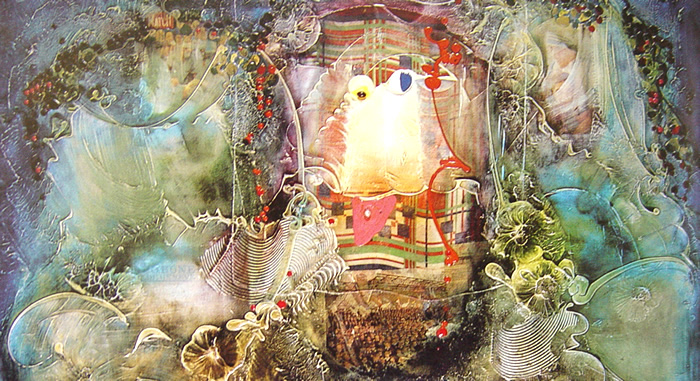
Donald, (120*195 cm, Oil on canvas)

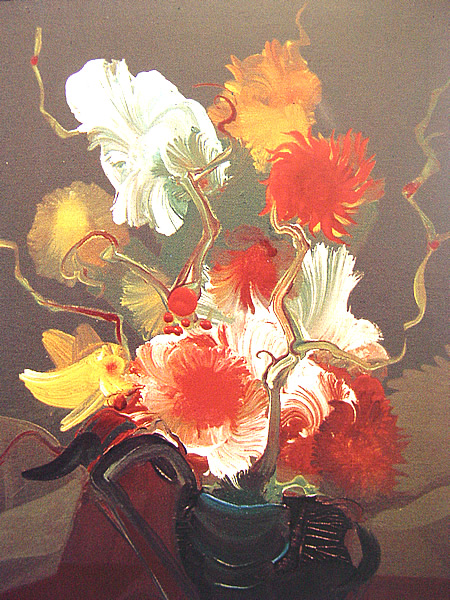
Vase of Flowers, 1971, (100*81 cm, Acrylic on canvas)

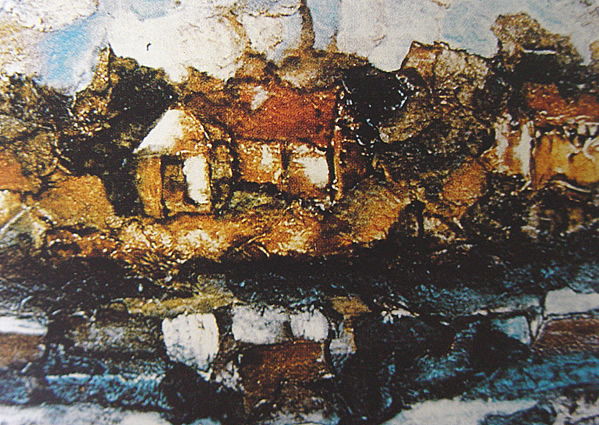
Breton Landscape, 1960, (73*92 cm, Oil on canvas)

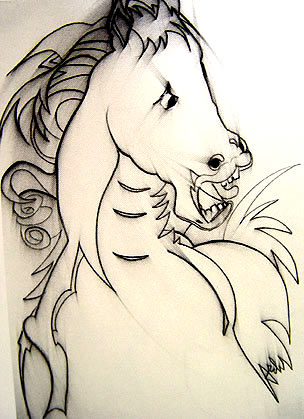
Tête de cheval, (Charcoal drawing)

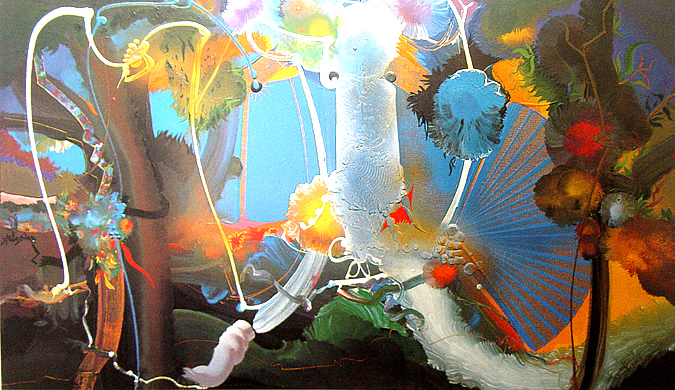
Rêve de jeune fille, 1969 (130*195 cm, Acrylic on canvas)

== Biography ==
- 1942-1944: Ecole de Vendargues./ Ink blots – Alphabet drawings.
- 1946-1948: Arts and Crafts Instruction Center of St-Godard (Loire, central France).
- 1948-1953: Vendargues – military service./ Departure heading to Paris./ Calligraphic and ideographic works./ First exhibition: Librairie de l'Institut, Paris (1953)./ Atelier du Timbre (stamp workshop), Paris./ Exhibition of calligraphic works (1953)./ "Le Signe" works in collaboration with the Guerman Collection.
- 1955: Sojourn in Vendargues./ Secondary works.
- 1956-1958: Montmartre./ Meets Georges Braque./ First figurative drawings./ Meets the collector Fren Orain – sells first works./ Meets Henri Michaux. Patachou, and Georges Brassens.
- 1958-1963: Show at the Galerie Alex Maguy./ Art courses at the Académie de la Grande Chaumière./ Figurative period./ Art courses with Professor Lemagny (recipient of the Grand Prix de Rome for drawing and engraving) of the Des Beaux-Arts./ Village to village tour of France as painter (during one and half years)./ Exclusive contract with Colmant and Marevery./ Landscapes (synthesis of fauvism and cubism)./ Becomes friends with Lorjou, Marcel Aymé, Jacques Brel.
- 1964-1965: Show at the Galerie Bernheim-Jeune, Paris (Ten years of painting)./ First Transfiguration./ Home museum in Marly-le-Roi: paintings, drawings, mosaics, stained-glass, frescos./ Sales of works to the Theffaut Collection in Versailles./ Television show.
- 1967-1968: Meets André Malraux, first interview./ In contact with Olivier Messiaen./ Lecture at the Sorbonne with Max-Pol Fouché./ Contract with Manera./ Show in Houston (Texas), Norbert Gallery./ Sales of works to the Roger Haubert Collection./ Show at Princeton University (New Jersey)./ Meets and becomes friends with Françoise Sagan.
- 1968-1969: Show at the Coudray Golf Club, organized by the "Groupe de Paris" with the Minister of Information Jacques Beaumel and Aimé Maeght./ Becomes friends with Paul Emile Victor, Henri de Monffreid, and François Chalais./ André Malraux pays visit to the artist./ Show at the Palais de la Radio, Paris, with the participation of Hans Hartung./ Exhibition at RTL, Paris./ Show at the Musée National d'Art Moderne, Paris (September’68).
- 1970: Presentation of the painter's works at the Parisian restaurant "Le Laurent", in the presence of Coco Chanel, Michèle Morgan, André Malraux, Paul Louis Weiller, Don Juan of Spain, Guy de Rothschild, the Ambassador of Japan Kita Hara, and the Minister for Arts Jacques Duhamel.
- 1970-1975: The artist retires to the Landes (SW France)./ Paints the frescoes for the Eglise de Sainte Eulalie, Béarn (Landes)./ Sales of works to collectors Roland Pozzi di Bozzo./ Bleustein-Blanchet, Edmont Tenoudji./ Show at Claude Lelouch's "Club 13", with the Minister of Arts Maurice Druon in attendance./ "Période Blanche" White Period (1972–1973).
- 1975-1976: The artist returns to Paris for the "Juillet et Aout" show at the Jardins des Tuileries. Attending the inauguration were Michel Guy, Minister of Arts and the Minister of Education.
- 1975-1980: Period said:"American" or Blue Period.
- 1976-1986: Mystic period – Transcendence./ "Période Noire" (Black Period)./ The artist settles in Switzerland.
- 1988: Show at the Musée de l'Athénée, Geneva.
- 1989: Show at the Chicago John Wilson Art Gallery, under the patronage of the French Embassy in the presence of the Ambassador of France, the Mayor of Chicago and the Governor of New York./ Peking (China) – show cancelled due to revolution.
- 1990: Vendargues – Homage to the "Languedoc-Roussillon" painters.
- 1991: Show at the Galerie Albert 1er, Paris./ Sale of works to Foundation "Z", Bruges (Belgium).
- 1992: Show at the Musée de l'Athénée, Geneva (June through September).
- 1993: Show at Galerie Jacquester, Paris./ Show at the Castle of Marbach (Germany).
- 1994: Forum Show, Crédit Suisse, Geneva./ Forum Show, Crans-Montana, (Switzerland).
- 1995: Show at the Seibu Department Store, Tokyo, under the patronage of the Ambassador of France./ Demonstration, Los Angeles./ Forum Show, Crans-Montana (Switzerland)./ Represents France at a show in Luxemburg, European city of culture of the year, in the presence and under the patronage of the Ambassador of France./ Show at Galerie Rocco Turgi, Paris./ Show at the Centre Culturel, Verbier (Switzerland).
- 1997: Exhibition at "Palace", Monte Carlo, Monaco.
- 2000: Exhibition at "Espace Pierre Cardin", Paris.
- 2001: Exhibition at Theatre Mohammed V, Rabat Morocco.
- 2003: Archiguille Premier Exhibition, Geneva Switzerland.
- 2004: Exhibition at the United Nations, Palais des Nations, Geneva, Switzerland.
- 2007: Exhibition at the Palau de la Música in Valencia, (33rd America's Cup) Spain./ Exhibition at the Russian Academy of Fine Arts, Moscow, Russia.

== Media coverage ==
=== Television ===
- 1964: Program on the artist's home museum in Marly-le-Roi, 1st channel
- 1965: Journal Paris - Isle de France
- 1968: Educational program ORTF (drawing lessons). Reportage on the artist's lecture at the Sorbonne. Max-Pol Fouché interview
- 1969: 1pm and 8pm newscasts - Reportage on the Musée National d'Art Moderne
- 1970: Newscast live from the Parisian restaurant "Laurent" during an evening show of the artist's works on channel 1
- 1975: 1pm newscast with Yves Mourousi on channel 1
- 1988: Journal TV (newscast), 11pm on Antenne 2
- 1989: Beijing - cultural Chinese television program (press coverage in La Clarté)
- 1989: USA - two cultural programs (Chicago, New York)
- 1991: Journal TV (newscast), 8pm with Georges Begou on Antenne 2
- 1991: Journal TV (newscast), 11pm on channel 1, 1pm on channel 3
- 1991: USSR - One cultural program (Moscow)
- 1992: Journal TV (newscast), 1pm on France 2
- 1993: "Le Divan" (the couch) with Henri Chapier on France 3
- 1994: Four reportages on TV5
- 1995: National Television, Tokyo
- 1995: National Television, Luxemburg
- 2000: Journal TV (newscast), France 2 (Expo Pierre Cardin, Paris)
- 2007: Journal TV (newscast), Moscow channel 24

=== Press ===
- France - Major newspapers.
- USA - 1989: New York Times; Chicago (all the newspapers); Washington:Post, USA Today; Los Angeles: Los Angeles Magazine, City Star; San Francisco; Kansas City; Miami: Sky Magazine; Woman's Day, Broadway; New York: Good Housekeeping; Naperville: City Star.
- Switzerland - La Tribune de Genève; La Suisse; Le Matin; L'Hebdo; L'Illustré.
- Greece - Athens: Pagevematini.
- China - 1980: Beijing: La Clarté.
- Japan - 1995: The Japan Times.

=== Franco-Swiss press ===
- ROUSTEAU (Fabrice), "La France d'en haut", in Beaux Arts Magazine, July 2002, p7
- BELLET (Harry), "La nouvelle école de Paris, art autre tombé dans l'oubli", in LE MONDE, July 27, 2002, p22
- BELLET (Harry), "Le peintre Georges Mathieu sort du purgatoire", in LE MONDE, July 27, 2002, p22
- In "La Gazette de l'Hôtel Drouot, nº 26 from June 30, 1995, article pertaining to a record sale, p52
- LORNE (Peter), "Archi-succès pour le peintre Archiguille invité de Victor Ebner Finance", in Le Nouveau Quotidien, March 18, 1994, p17
- "Bonjour Archiguille" in Le quotidien de Paris, nº4349 November 8, 1993
- CHIUCH (Lionel), "Achiguille: La peinture est un sacerdoce", in Trajectoire Magazine, n º2 June 1993, p12
- "Archiguille: pour créer il faut être capable de rêver" in Tribune des Arts, nº13 from July 1992, p23
- ARCHIGUILLE, "De la transfiguration", in The Best, 2nd trimester 1991, p16
- RUSE (Cirisica), "Archiguille ou la transfiguration", in Tribune des Arts, May 6, 1991, p10
- V.M, "Archiguille expose", in La Tribune de Genève, from May 4 and 5, Parisian pages.
- "Archiguille bat des records", in La Gazette de l'Hôtel Drouot, n º18 of May 3, 1991, p42
- "L’art à la portée de tous", in Midi Libre, September 16, 1990, pV2
- J.-C. P., "100 tableaux de mâtres sous le marteau de Me Kohn", in Tribune des Arts, June 13, 1990, pp75–77
- J.-C. P., "La foire de l'art de Chicago: un passage obligé", in Tribune des Arts, June 7, 1989, p9
- MOESCHLER (Vinciane), "Archiguille crée l'événement énement à Chicago", in Tribune des Arts, June 7, 1989, pp18–19
- MILLET (Catherine), "L’art moderne est un musée", in Art Press, hors série n º15, 1994, p151-158.
- CABANNE (Pierre), "Fautrier, la matière écorchée", dans Beaux-Arts Magazine, n º69 June 1989, pp64–73
- ZUMKELLER (Alexandra), "Archiguille ou le peintre cache des collectionneurs", in Happy few, Summer 1988, p80-82
- SCHNEIDER (Edgar), "Ce chouchou de Danielle Mitterrand" in Les étoiles, May 15, 1988, p. 51
- "Archiguille" in La Suisse, May 7, 1988, p8
- SAGAN (Françoise), "Archiguille: miraculeux retour de l'exil", in Tribune des Arts, May 4, 1988, p19
- FAURE-GEORS (Hubert), "Cette célébrité Archiguille", in Aurore Paris, February 1970 p.?
- "Pourquoi les abstraits utilisent le clair-obscure?", in Art Magazine, 1956 pp60–67
- REVEL (Jean-François), "Tout un courant de la peinture actuelle attire par la calligraphie", in Art Magazine, 1956, pp126–135

== Exhibitions ==
- 1953: Exhibition at the bookstore of the "Le Signe" Institute in Paris.
- 1968: Exhibition at the National Modern Art Museum, Palais de Tokyo, Paris.
- 1969: Exhibition in Houston, Norbert Gallery.
- 1973: A series of Transfigurations with mirror and laces.
- 1974: Production of a fresco at the St Eulalie Church in Borne.
- 1988: Exhibition at the Musée Athénée with Madame Mitterrand, Geneva.
- 1989: Exhibition at the "John Wilson Art Gallery", Lake Point Tower, Chicago.
- 1991: Exhibition at the "Galerie Albert 1er", Paris.
- 1992: Exhibition at the Musée Athénée organised by the «Musée des Beaux-Arts», with Jack Lang, Geneva.
- 1993: Exhibitions at "La Galerie Jacquester", Paris and at the "Château de Marbach", Germany.
- 1994: Exhibitions at Forum Show, Crédit Suisse in Geneva and in Crans-Montana, Switzerland.
- 1995: Exhibitions at Seibu, a large department store in Tokyo, Japan; Crans-Montana in Switzerland, Los Angeles and in Luxembourg.
- 1997: Exhibition at the Palace, Monte-Carlo, Monaco.
- 1998: Atlanta, USA: Exhibition held at the French Embassy.
- 2000: Exhibition at the Espace Pierre Cardin, Paris.
- 2001: Exhibition at the Mohammed V. Rabat's Theatre, Morocco. Decoration of the polyester cows of natural size. 1st Prize, Geneva.
- 2003: Geneva, Switzerland: Archiguille Premier Exhibition.
- 2004: Exhibition at the United Nations, Palais des Nations, Geneva Switzerland.
- 2007: Exhibition at the Palau de la Música in Valencia, 33rd America's Cup, Spain.
- 2007: (December) Exhibition at the Russian Academy of Fine Arts in Moscow.

== Honors and awards ==
- 2007: Archiguille was raised as knight «des Beaux-Arts» at the Russian Academy of Art in Moscow. He is the Honorary Member of the Academy.
- 2004: Nominated by Prince Albert of Monaco, President of La Croix-Rouge Monégasque to be honored during the annual Gala held in Monaco. Archiguille's works are exhibited at the Charity Gala de la Croix-Rouge.
- 1991: 1st European Excellence Prize for Painting, Luxembourg.
- 1989: Recipient of the World's Most Elegant Man Award 1989 by «Le Best de la Haute Couture Internationale».
