= Réunion des Organismes d'Assurance Mutuelle =

ROAM
- Founded: 1855; France
- Founder: Gustave Haugk
- Region served: France
- Members: 46 mutual insurance companies
- Key people: Olivier Désert

ROAM (Réunion des Organismes d’Assurance Mutuelle) is an association at the service of mutual insurance companies for more than 150 years.

== History ==
Created in 1855 by a group of directors of mutual insurance companies in order to hold exchanges regarding their status as mutual organisations and to defend the provision of insurance services in the mutual form, as an alternative to joint-stock companies.

Today, this professional French association brings together 46 companies all of whom are subject to the regulations of the Insurance Code and to the supervision of the ACAM (Insurance Supervisory Authority in France).

ROAM gathers mutual insurance companies (MIC) : an MIC is insurance company that does not have its capital divided into shares, is collectively managed by it policyholders who are also its members and which acts in their best interests.

== ROAM’s actions ==
ROAM takes a proactive role, at both the national and international level, to defend the model of mutual insurance and, more specifically, the general interests of the small and medium-sized mutual insurance companies which continue to maintain a very close link with their original mutual principles.

=== At the international level ===
It is a direct member of Amice (Association of Mutual Insurers and Insurance Cooperatives in Europe) at the European level and its members participate in many of the working groups organised by AMICE (Solvency II, European Mutual, European Affairs, etc.). ROAM has also assumed responsibility for the coordination of the study on comparative law, "MIC: regulatory, financial and fiscal provisions" in five European countries (France, Italy, Spain, Belgium and the Netherlands) and the United States.

As a direct member of ICMIF, ROAM takes every opportunity to represent the interests of its members at the world level and also shares its experiences by creating links with mutuals across the world.

== Challenges to be faced ==
=== Solvency II ===
There is a challenge regarding both Pillar I and Pillar II. Significant changes are underway with the introduction of Solvency II. Both for pillar I, quantitative requirements, and pillar II, internal control requirements, a real revolution is taking place at the European level and this will have considerable repercussions on the French market. Certain specialised French mutual insurance companies could find themselves facing an own funds requirement that is often five to ten times higher than the current requirement. The introduction and effective follow-up of a well-structured internal control system will pose problems for all small structures (in terms of cost and internal expertise). ROAM, which has been involved in this process since the project's inception, defends its members position by contributing to the consultation process on an ongoing basis and also by directly lobbying the European authorities.

Governance would also appear to be a sensitive issue for French mutualists, who have been faced with significant successive changes to their regulations (in 2002, 2003 and then again in 2005) and so have had to respond to the continual challenge regarding the recognition of their statute and of their specificities by adapting to these changes.

=== European Mutual ===
Since there is no European instrument to enable them to establish groupings at this level, then the French mutuals are at a competitive disadvantage compared to joint stock companies, since they do not have access to the same legal instruments: ROAM continues its efforts to promote the mutual status at the European level and calls for the introduction of a European Mutual status in order to allow mutuals to join forces with one another to create groupings at a cross-border level. In the context of Solvency II, this instrument becomes essential.

In 2009, ROAM's Mutual insurance companies achieved a turnover of 11 billion Euros (direct business in France + reinsurance accepted + foreign activities), meaning that they therefore hold approximately 6% of the insurance market in France, but more than 39% of the builders liability market and more than 58% of medical malpractice liability market.
