= Chassey-lès-Montbozon =

- Commune
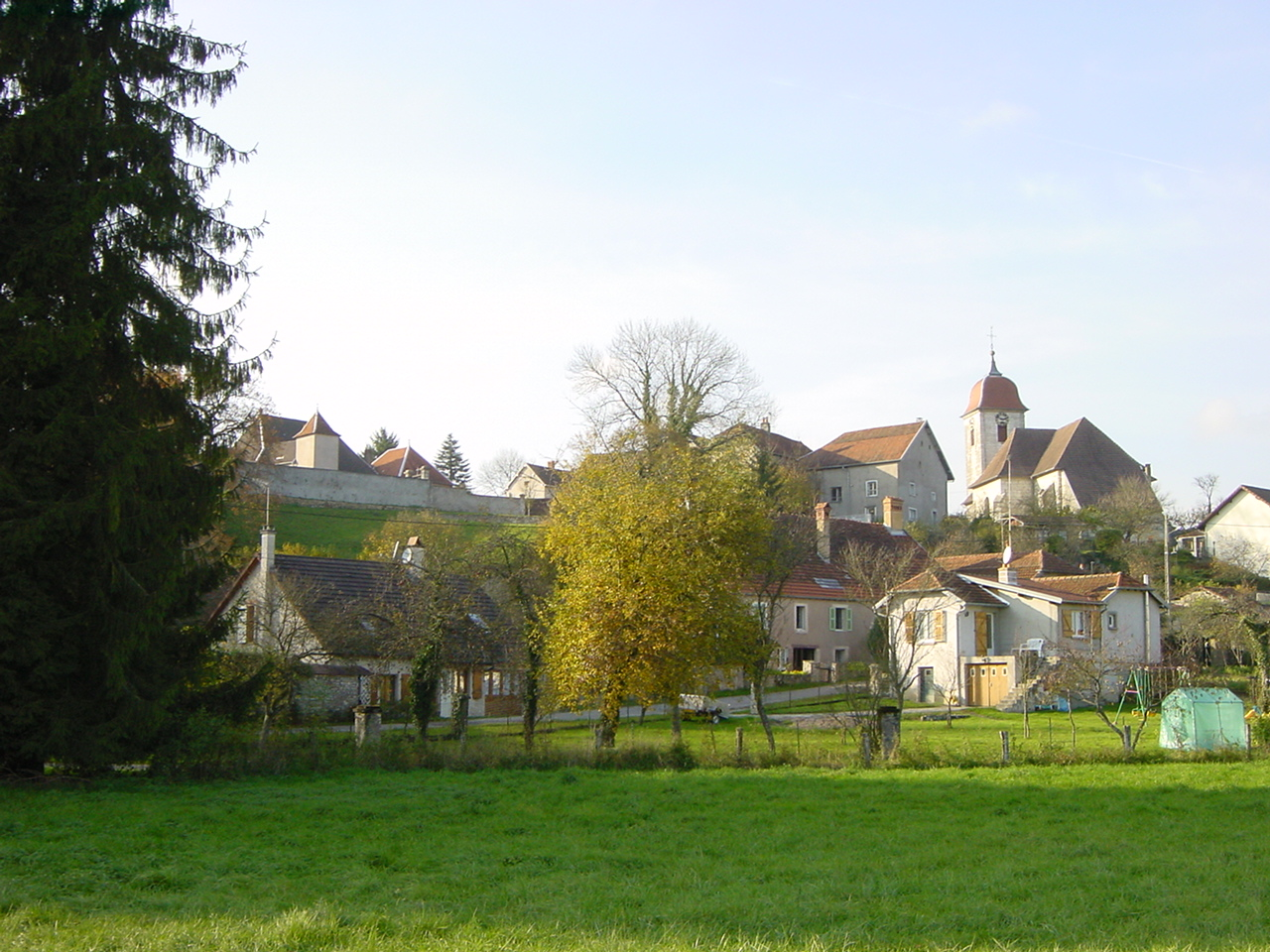
- A general view of Chassey-lès-Montbozon

- Coat of arms
- Location of Chassey-lès-Montbozon
- Location within France Location within Bourgogne-Franche-Comté
- Coordinates: 47°30′41″N 6°20′03″E
- Country: France
- Region: Bourgogne-Franche-Comté
- Department: Haute-Saône
- Arrondissement: Vesoul
- Canton: Rioz

Government
  - Mayor (2023–2026): Michel Delbos
- Area^{1}: 15.60 km^{2} (6.02 sq mi)
- Highest elevation: 408 m (1,339 ft)
- Lowest elevation: 248 m (814 ft)
- Population (2023): 230
  - Density: 15/km^{2} (38/sq mi)
- Time zone: UTC+01:00 (CET)
  - Summer (DST): UTC+02:00 (CEST)
- INSEE/Postal code: 70137 /70230
- ^{1} French Land Register data, which excludes lakes, ponds, glaciers > 1 km^{2} (0.386 sq mi or 247 acres) and river estuaries.

Chassey-lès-Montbozon (French pronunciation: [ʃasɛ lɛ mɔ̃bozɔ̃], literally Chassey near Montbozon) is a commune in the Haute-Saône department in the region of Bourgogne-Franche-Comté in eastern France.

== See also ==
- Communes of the Haute-Saône department
