= 1934 in France =

- Decades: 1910s; 1920s; 1930s; 1940s; 1950s
- See also: History of France; Timeline of French history; List of years in France

Events from the year 1934 in France.

== Incumbents ==
- President: Albert Lebrun
- President of the Council of Ministers:
  - until 30 January: Camille Chautemps
  - 30 January-9 February: Édouard Daladier
  - 9 February-8 November: Gaston Doumergue
  - starting 8 November: Pierre-Étienne Flandin

== Events ==
- 6 February – 6 February 1934 crisis: an anti-parliamentarist demonstration organised in Paris by far-right leagues finishes in a riot and leads to the resignation of Édouard Daladier.
- 9 February – Gaston Doumergue forms a new government.
- 18 February – Orchestre national is founded by decree of the Minister of Posts, Telegraphs, and Telephones Jean Mistler as an ensemble of 80 musicians, with Désiré-Emile Inghelbrecht as musical director. The orchestra plays its first concert on 13 March at the Conservatoire de Paris.
- 9 October – King Alexander of Yugoslavia and French foreign minister Louis Barthou are assassinated during the king's state visit in Marseille.
- 2 December – first public performance by the Quintette du Hot Club de France at the Ecole Normale de Musique, 78 rue Cardinet in Paris, as "Un orchestre d'un genre nouveau de Jazz Hot", led by Django Reinhardt.

== Sport ==
- 6 April – The French Rugby League was formed.
- 3 July – Tour de France begins.
- 29 July – Tour de France ends, won by Antonin Magne.

== Births ==
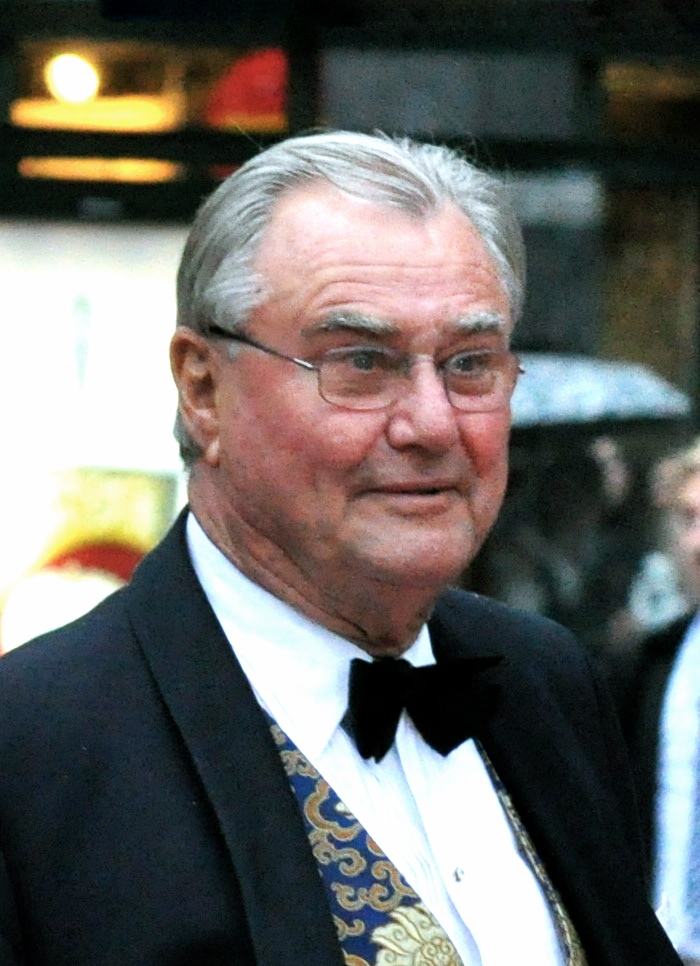
Prince Henrik of Denmark

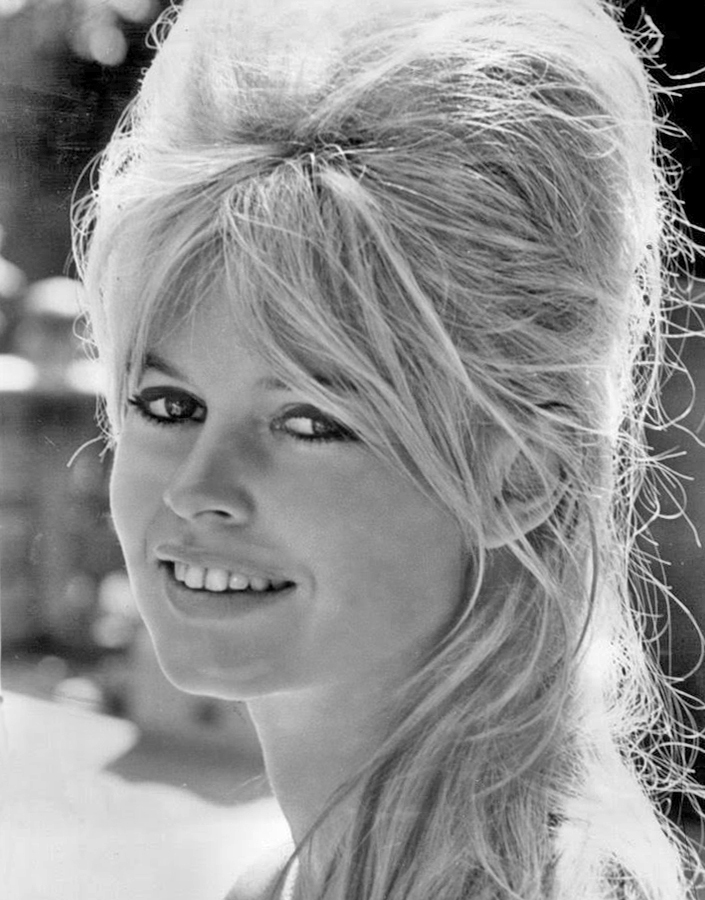
Brigitte Bardot

- 1 January – Asher Peres, French-born Israeli physicist, considered a pioneer in quantum information theory (died 2005)
- 8 January – Jacques Anquetil, cyclist, five times Tour de France winner (died 1987)
- 14 January – Pierre Darmon, tennis player
- 25 January – Jean-Pierre Yvaral, artist (died 2002)
- 27 January – Édith Cresson, Prime Minister of France
- 11 February – Maryse Condé, novelist (died 2024)
- 27 February – Vincent Fourcade, interior designer (died 1992)
- 2 March – Robert Batailly, politician (died 2017)
- 15 April – Solange Fernex, pacifist activist and politician (died 2006)
- 17 May – Pierre Clastres, anthropologist and ethnographer (died 1977)
- 28 May – Jean Haudry, linguist (died 2023)
- 4 June – Pierre Eyt, Roman Catholic cardinal (died 2001)
- 11 June – Prince Henrik of Denmark, born Henri Laborde de Monpezat (died 2018)
- 20 June – Georges Lemoine, politician (died 2025)
- 6 July – Michel Crauste, rugby union player (died 2019)
- 9 July – Pierre Perret, singer and composer
- 17 July – Philippe Capdenat, composer (died 2025)
- 18 July – Jean-Michel Sanejouand, painter and sculptor (died 2021)
- 26 July – Jean Marie Balland, Roman Catholic Cardinal (died 1998)
- 21 August – Paul-André Meyer, mathematician (died 2003)
- 16 September – Paul-Louis Halley, billionaire businessman (died 2003)
- 28 September – Brigitte Bardot, actress and animal rights activist (died 2025)
- 5 October – Monique Papon, politician (died 2018)
- 26 October – Jacques Loussier, classical/jazz pianist (died 2019)

== Deaths ==
- 6 January – Fernand Lataste, zoologist (born 1847)
- 14 January – Paul Marie Eugène Vieille, chemist and gunsmith (born 1854)
- 19 February – Ellen Richards Ridgway, American golfer (born 1866)
- 28 May – Eugenie Besserer, actress (born 1868)
- 15 June – Alfred Bruneau, composer (born 1857)
- 4 July – Marie Curie, physicist (born 1867)
- 8 July – Benjamin Baillaud, astronomer (born 1848)
- 25 July – François Coty, perfume manufacturer (born 1874)
- 27 July – Hubert Lyautey, Marshal of France (born 1854)
- 15 October – Raymond Poincaré, statesman, five times Prime Minister of France, President of France (born 1860)
- 2 November – Edmond James de Rothschild, philanthropist (born 1845)
- 12 November – Walther Bensemann, German-Jewish association football pioneer (born 1873)
- 17 November – Gaëtan Gatian de Clérambault, psychiatrist (born 1872)
- 4 December – Paul-Albert Besnard, painter (born 1849)

== See also ==
- List of French films of 1934
