= Orange Festival =

The Orange Festival (also known as Orange 75) was a three-day music festival held 15-17 August 1975 at the Roman Theatre of Orange in Orange, France. At the time it was promoted as the "French Woodstock". A partial list of performers included Wishbone Ash, Bad Company, Fairport Convention, Jess Roden, Procol Harum, Mahavishnu Orchestra, Climax Blues Band, Tangerine Dream, John Martyn, Lou Reed, Medicine Head and John Cale.
