= Jules Culot =

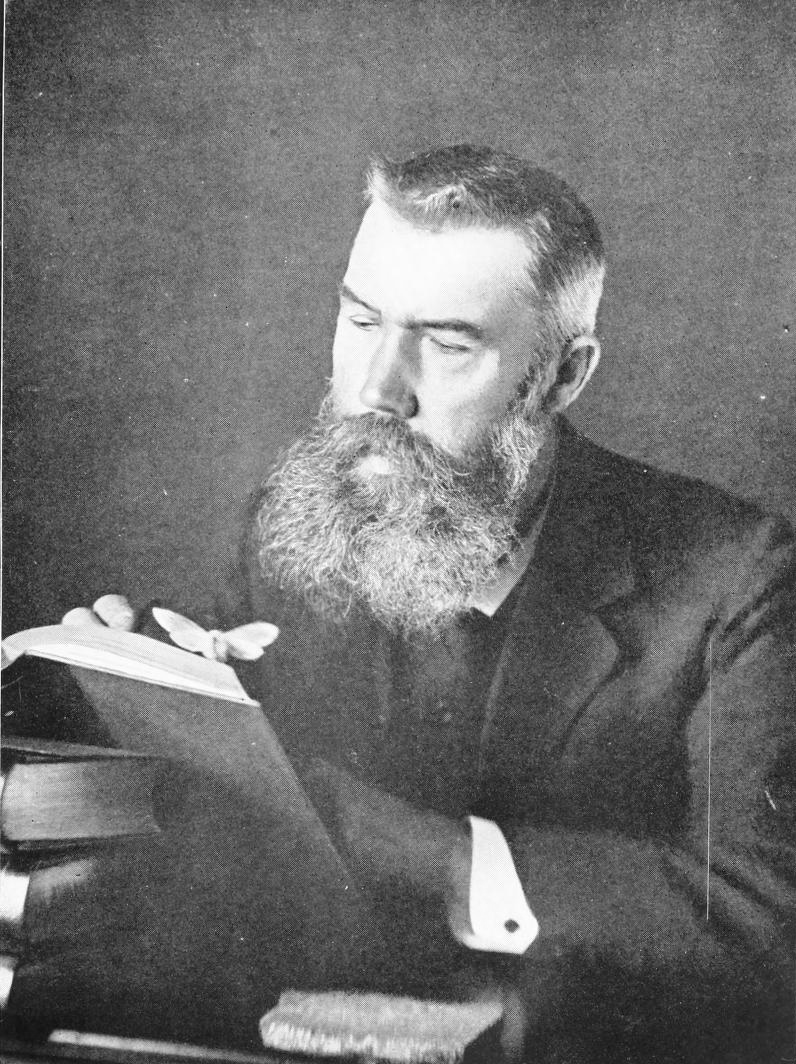
Jules Culot

Jules Culot (2 November 1861 – 17 September 1933) was a French entomologist and an entomological illustrator who specialised in Coleoptera and Lepidoptera.

His Coleoptera collection is held by the Natural History Museum of Geneva. His Lepidoptera collection was given to his daughters and their present location is unknown. He wrote Noctuelles et géomètres d'Europe. Volumes I-IV. Genève, Villa les Iris (1909–1913, 1917–1919) online, an illustrated revision of the Noctuidae (with 81 plates) and the Geometridae (with 70 plates) of Europe. Jules Culot was a friend of Charles Oberthur.
