= 1931 in France =

- Decades: 1910s; 1920s; 1930s; 1940s; 1950s
- See also: History of France; Timeline of French history; List of years in France

Events from the year 1931 in France.

== Incumbents ==
- President: Gaston Doumergue (until 13 June), Paul Doumer (starting 13 June)
- President of the Council of Ministers: Theodore Steeg (until 27 January), Pierre Laval (starting 27 January)

== Events ==
- 27 January – Pierre Laval forms a government in France.
- 6 May – Paris Colonial Exposition opens.
- 13 May – Paul Doumer elected president of France.
- 14 June – Overloaded pleasure craft Saint-Philibert, carrying trippers home to Nantes from Île de Noirmoutier, sinks at the mouth of the river Loire and over 450 drown.
- 8 November- French police launch a large scale raid against Corsican bandits.

== Births ==
=== January to June ===
- 7 February – Serge Danot, animator (died 1991)
- 26 February – Jacques Rouxel, animator (died 2004)
- 6 March – Nicolas Barone, cyclist (died 2003)
- 22 May – Francis Méano, French footballer (died 1953)
- 24 May – Michael Lonsdale, actor (died 2020)
- 3 June – Jean Bouise, actor (died 1989)
- 5 June – Jacques Demy, film director (died 1990)
- 30 June – Joseph Thomin, racing cyclist (died 2018)

=== July to December ===
- 1 July – Leslie Caron, actress
- 3 July – Claude-Henri Chouard, surgeon
- 4 July – Sébastien Japrisot, author, screenwriter and film director (died 2003)
- 6 July – Louis Mexandeau, politician (died 2023)
- 24 July – Éric Tabarly, sailor (died 1998)
- 23 August – Coccinelle, transsexual actress and entertainer (died 2006)
- 13 October – Raymond Kopa, footballer (died 2017)
- 25 October – Annie Girardot, actress (died 2011)
- 5 November – Thérèse Aillaud, politician (died 2015)
- 6 November – André Trochut, cyclist (died 1996)
- 17 November – Pierre Nora, historian (died 2025)
- 12 December – Christian Metz, film theorist (died 1993)
- 18 December – André S. Labarthe, French actor (died 2018)
- 28 December – Guy Debord, Marxist theorist, writer and filmmaker (died 1994)

== Deaths ==
- 3 January – Joseph Joffre, general (born 1852)
- 7 January - Joseph Bernard, sculptor (born 1866)
- 1 February – Emmanuel d'Orléans, noble from the House of Orléans (born 1872)
- 4 February – Dominique-Marie Gauchet, admiral (born 1853)
- 31 March – Henri Béraldi, bibliophile and publisher (born 1849)
- 7 May – Anne Boutiaut Poulard, cook (born 1851)
- 22 June – Armand Fallières, politician, President of France (born 1841)
- 11 July – Jean-Louis Forain, Impressionist artist (born 1852)
- 2 November – Alexandre Darracq, automobile manufacturer (born 1855)
- 7 November – Étienne Bazeries, military cryptanalyst (born 1846)
- 2 December – Vincent d'Indy, composer (born 1851)
- 13 December – Gustave Le Bon, psychologist (born 1841)

== See also ==
- Interwar France
