= Clinical empathy =

Clinical empathy is expressed as the skill of understanding what a patient says and feels, and effectively communicating this understanding to the patient. The opposite of clinical empathy is clinical detachment. Detached concern, or clinical detachment, is the ability to distance oneself from the patient in order to serve the patient from an objective standpoint. For physicians to maximize their role as providers, a balance must be developed between clinical detachment and clinical empathy.

In 2001, an instrument was created to measure a physician's empathy towards each patient. This tool is called the Jefferson Scale of Physician Empathy. The 20-item questionnaire was originally developed for administration to medical students and physicians but has extended to dentistry and nursing because it is easy to interpret, administer, and analyze.

From a student's first year to their fourth year in medical school, empathy scores on the Jefferson Scale of Physician Empathy (S-version) decrease. Both gender and specialty choice affect empathy scores, favoring women and primary care specialties.

== Clinical empathy ==
Clinical empathy is a main component of the patient-provider relationship. It is seen as a commonly accepted pillar of professionalism for medical students. Empathy involves both cognitive and affective aspects. The cognitive domain revolves around understanding a patient's experiences and being able to understand the world from their point of view. This contrasts the affective aspect of empathy which involves joining in the patient's emotional experiences and feelings, which correlates closer to sympathy. Empathetic physicians share understanding with patients, which serves to benefit the patient in their physical, mental and social well-being. Both a provider's ability to provide empathetic care as well as a perception of this care by the patient are important in diagnosis and treatment. Developing the ability to understand a patient's thoughts and feelings lends itself to a successful medical interview and collaborative treatment. Practicing empathy in a clinical setting leads to greater patient satisfaction, better compliance, and fewer lawsuits.

== Clinical detachment ==
Clinical detachment is a means of providing objective, detached medical care while maintaining enough concern for the patient to offer emotional understanding. A close patient-provider relationship threatens objectivity, therefore a social distance is expected to ensure professionalism. Students in medical school are taught clinical detachment as a protective mechanism for dealing with emotional experiences such as death and dying. Clinical detachment is also a means of dealing with the pressure of making mistakes and medical uncertainty. Suppression and repression of emotions, intellectualization, and humor are mechanisms used to confront distressing situations in order to give an objective assessment.

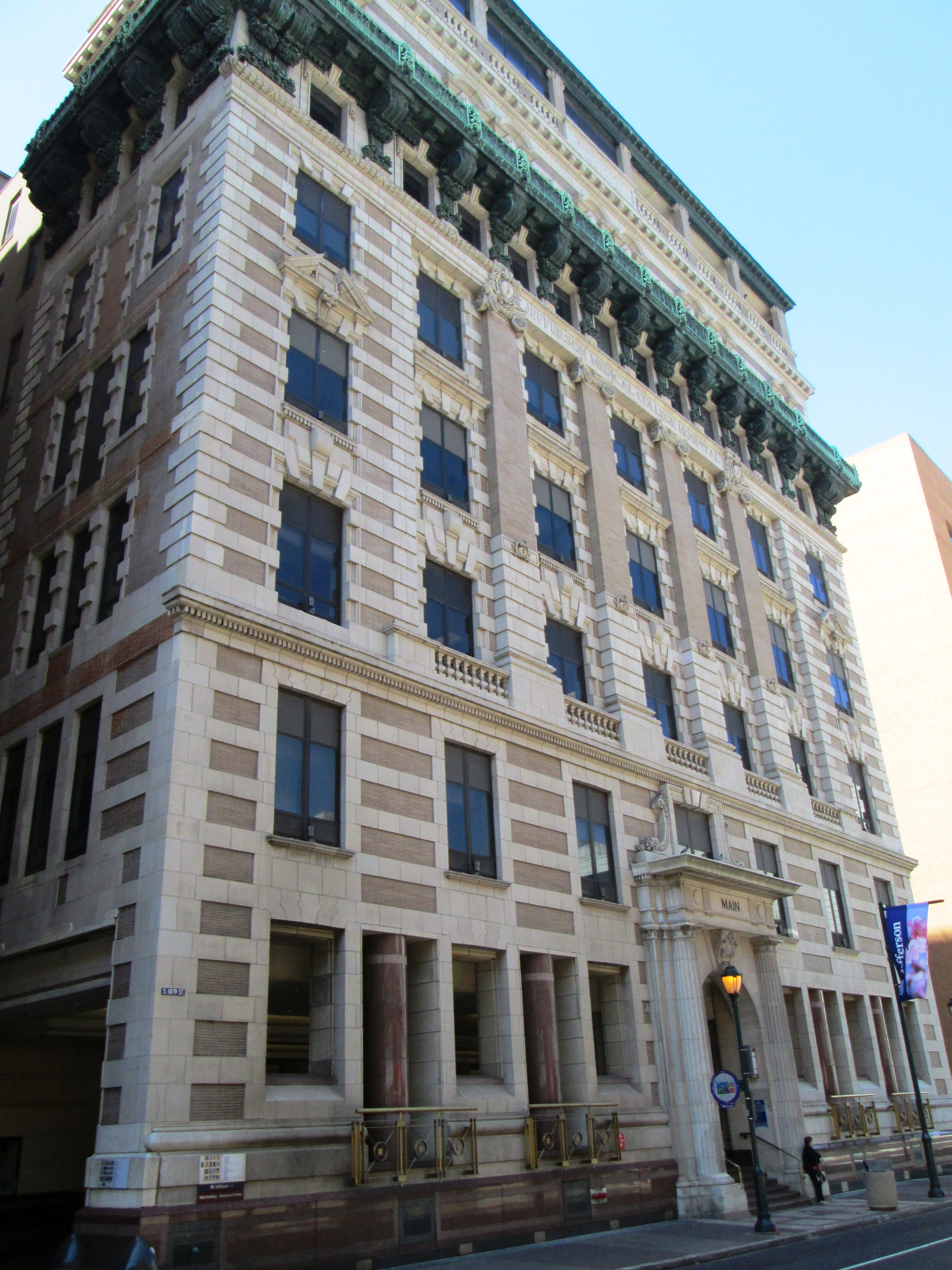
Jefferson Medical College Main Building 132 S. 10th Street

== Measurement ==
Because empathy is a multi-faceted and complex concept, measurement proves to be difficult. Although there are scales to measure empathy such as the Interpersonal Reactivity Index, developed by Davis, the Emotional Empathy Scale, developed by Mehrabian and Epstein, and the Hogan Empathy Scale, they were not created explicitly to measure physician empathy. The Jefferson Scale of Physician Empathy was created at the Center for Research in Medical Education and Health Care (CRMEHC) at Jefferson Medical College to measure patient perceptions of empathy from their provider. Construct validity, criterion-related validity, predictive validity, internal consistency, and test-retest reliability all provide empirical support for the Jefferson Scale of Physician Empathy. The scale was originally intended for distribution to medical students and physicians. Since its creation, it has been translated into 53 languages and applied to other medical professions such as dentistry and nursing. Three versions of the scale now exist, one for medical students (S-version), one for health professions (HP-version), and one for health professions students (HPS-version). Results of the 20 item questionnaire provide that higher scores are related to higher levels of empathy in interpersonal care. A single-item measure, the Rapid Assessment of Therapeutic Empathy (RATE) scale, has been validated to assess therapeutic empathy across different respondent groups. The patient-reported version was validated in 521 patients. Recent studies have also used rating scales to measure perceived empathy in interactions involving artificial intelligence (AI). A 2025 systematic review and meta-analysis reported that in text-based healthcare interactions, AI chatbots were rated as more empathic than human healthcare professionals in 13 of 15 comparative studies, although the authors cautioned that the evidence relied on ratings of text-only exchanges.

== Role in medical education ==
Medical students' first experience with a patient is often with a cadaver in a gross anatomy course. Working intimately with a cadaver during a gross anatomy course captures the essence of the patient-provider relationship. Cadaver dissection is a challenging emotional and mental experience. Involvement, emotional coping, and ability are three themes that develop during the dissection experience. Medical students in a gross anatomy course may experience mixed emotions and variable reactions to cadaver dissection. Students who view their donor as a scientific specimen are less opposed to dissection, whereas students who view their donor as a former living person face greater difficulty with dissection and foster feelings of empathy towards the cadaver. Because of the emotional impact of dissection, students may develop detached concern to cope with these feelings.

In western countries, medical education emphasizes a "body as first patient" philosophy for dissection. This anonymizes cadavers which fosters a different relationship than in eastern countries. Many eastern countries adopt a mindset of donor as "first teacher". For example, in Thailand, students are encouraged to develop a personal relationship with their donors. The students are instructed to view their donors with the highest honor and view the cadavers as a "great teacher". This intention allows medical students to form a relationship that is familiar to them, one of a teacher and student, as opposed to approaching their donor as a doctor, a practice that new and unfamiliar to students. Although eastern and western countries handle cadaver relationships differently, it can be generalized that gross anatomy courses offer an opportunity for students to examine their feelings on life, death, and dying. These courses also promote development of coping strategies for stressful situations.

Over the course of medical education, males and females differ in their attitudes and execution of empathetic treatment. Students entering people-oriented specialties such as family medicine, general internal medicine, and other primary care specialties have higher scores on the Jefferson Scale of Physician Empathy, whereas students entering technology-oriented specialties such as pathology, radiology, and anesthesiology score lower on empathy. Female students are more likely to enter people-oriented specialties whereas men are more likely to enter technology-oriented specialties. Female students score higher than male students on the Jefferson Scale of Physician Empathy across all years of medical school education. Female students also have a greater likelihood than men to disagree with a need for detached concern in order to provide the best medical treatment.

Several studies have indicated that clinical empathy may decline in students during medical school, with a change even being observed from the start to the end of first year. If this is the case, there could be negative consequences, as it is feared that a reduction in empathy may affect professionalism and quality of care.

A recent study investigate the causes of the decline. It seems that a "hidden curriculum" which includes a high workload, paucity of adequate role models, and lack of support can cause adaptations such as cynicism and detachment. In addition, the decrease may be due to the medical curriculum which may cause students to develop more of a scientific instead of a holistic approach to medicine.). Another reason is that medical school is a competitive environment that can cause students to prioritise their performance in medical school, rather than maintaining a caring demeanour. Similarly, it has also been suggested that as the pressure to obtain medical knowledge increases throughout medical school, students become more worried about retaining this knowledge alongside having to remain empathetic and caring towards patients. Students are more likely to lose their empathic qualities as compensation to allow them to still feel as though they are capable of learning all of the information they are required to. Furthermore, as students’ progress through medical school, they may be more likely to dehumanise patients to protect themselves from feelings of distress as they encounter increasingly challenging patients. As a result their empathy for patients may suffer.

== Maintenance ==
Many methods have been put forward which aim to maintain the empathy of healthcare students and professionals with varying success. Interventions have included medical humanities and creative arts around a patient narrative, writing interventions including creative writing and blogging, drama, formal communication and inter-personal skills training and problem based learning.
