= 1932 in France =

- Decades: 1910s; 1920s; 1930s; 1940s; 1950s
- See also: History of France; Timeline of French history; List of years in France

Events from the year 1932 in France.

== Incumbents ==
- President: Paul Doumer (until 7 May), Albert Lebrun (starting 10 May)
- President of the Council of Ministers:
  - until 20 February: Pierre Laval
  - 20 February-3 June: Édouard Daladier
  - 3 June-26 November: Édouard Herriot
  - starting 26 November: Joseph Paul-Boncour

== Events ==
- 1 May - Legislative Election held.
- 6 May - Paul Gorguloff assassinates President Paul Doumer in Paris. Doumer dies the next day.
- 8 May - Legislative Election held.
- 10 May - Albert Lebrun becomes the new President of France.
- 7 July - French submarine Prométhée sinks off Cherbourg - 66 dead.
- Aperitif Ricard first produced by Paul Ricard in Marseille.

== Arts and literature ==
- 14 January - Maurice Ravel's Concerto in G debuts with piano soloist Marguerite Long and Ravel conducting the Lamoureux Orchestra.

== Sport ==
- 6 July - Tour de France begins.
- 31 July - Tour de France ends, won by André Leducq.

== Births ==
=== January to June ===
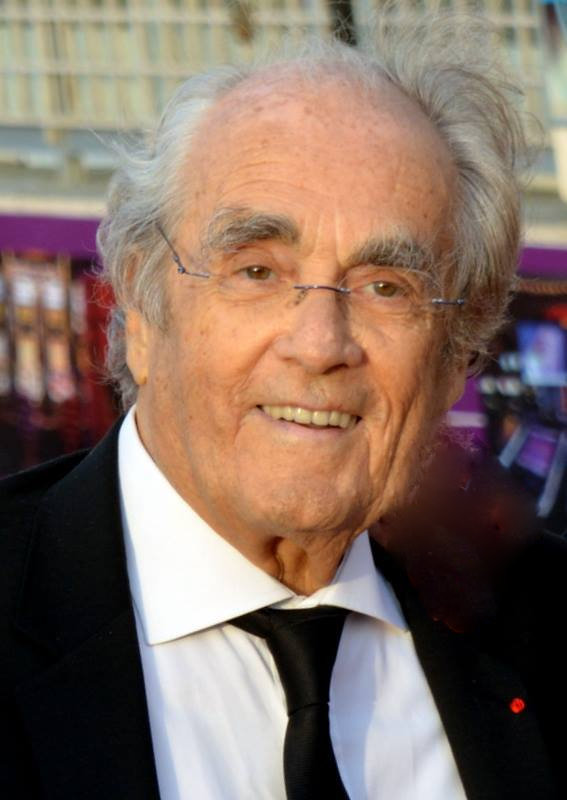
Michel Legrand

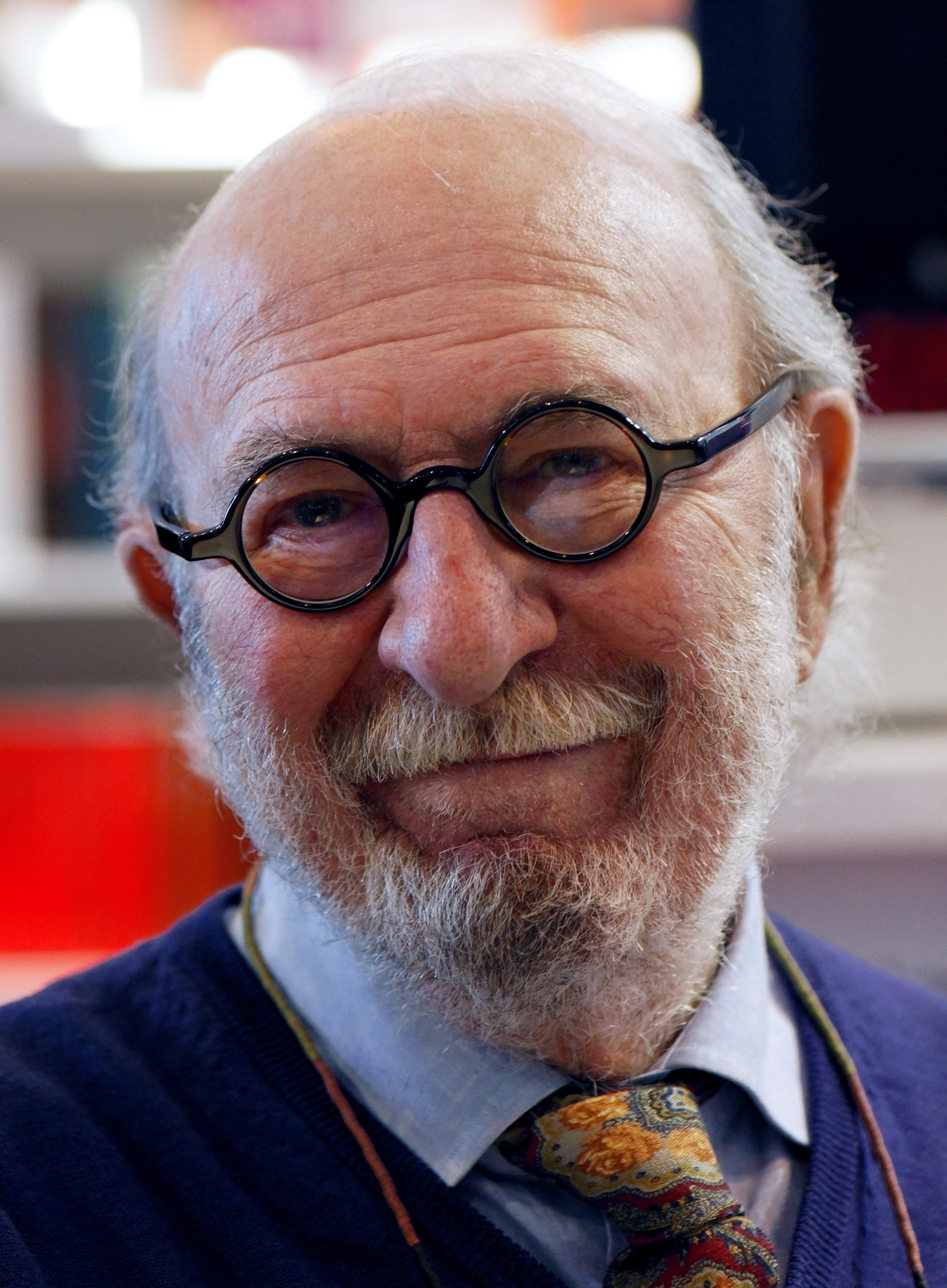
Jean-Pierre Marielle

- 31 January – Raymond Kaelbel, international soccer player (d. 2007)
- 6 February – François Truffaut, screenwriter, film director, producer and actor (d. 1984)
- 18 February – Alphonse Halimi, boxer (d. 2006)
- 19 February – Jean-Pierre Ponnelle, opera director (d. 1988)
- 22 February – Robert Opron, automotive designer (d. 2021)
- 24 February – Michel Legrand, composer, arranger, conductor and pianist (d. 2019)
- 18 March – Denise Cacheux, politician (d. 2023)
- 30 March – Ted Morgan, French-born biographer and journalist
- 4 April – Pierre Lacotte, ballet dancer and choreographer (d. 2023)
- 7 April – Françoise Dior, supporter of the postwar Nazi cause (d. 1993)
- 8 April – Jean-Paul Rappeneau, film director and screenwriter
- 12 April – Jean-Pierre Marielle, French actor (d. 2019)
- 16 April – Pierre Milza, French historian (d. 2018)
- 26 April – Francis Lai, French composer (d. 2018)
- 27 April – Anouk Aimée, born (Nicole) Françoise Dreyfus, film actress (d. 2024)
- 1 May – Charles Ducasse, soccer player (d. 1983)
- 17 May – Archiguille, painter (d. 2017)
- 21 May – Jean Stablinski, racing cyclist (d. 2007)

=== July to December ===
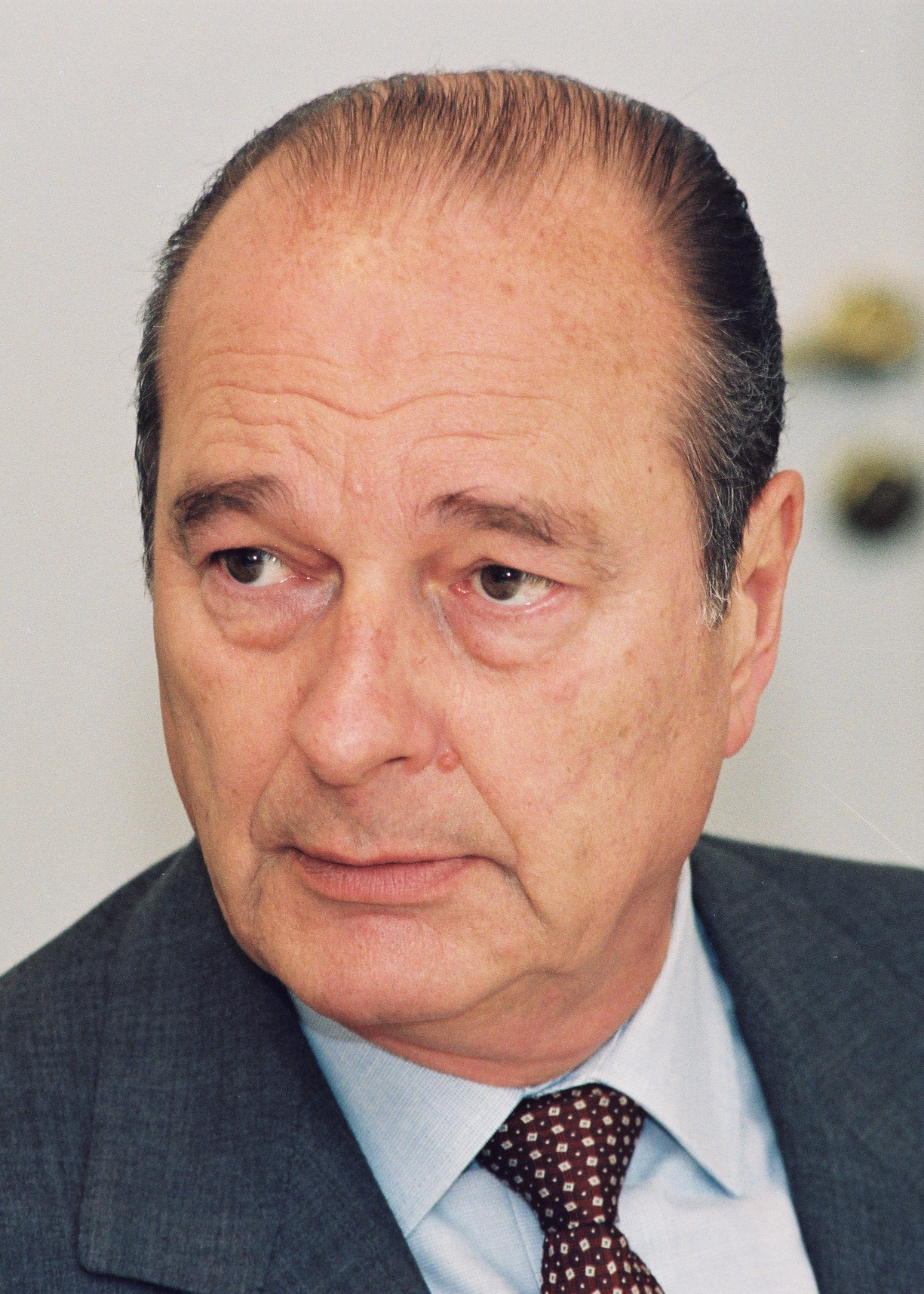
Jacques Chirac

- 1 July- Ze'ev Schiff, French-born Israeli military journalist (d. 2007)
- 21 July - Marie-Claire Bancquart, poet and critic (d. 2019)
- 22 July – Jean Barthe, French rugby league and rugby union player (d. 2017)
- 17 August – Jean-Jacques Sempé, cartoonist (Le Petit Nicolas) (d. 2022)
- 18 August – Luc Montagnier, French virologist and Nobel Prize winner (d. 2022)
- 19 August - Jacques Lob, comic book creator (d. 1990)
- 25 August - Gérard Lebovici, film producer, editor and impresario (d. 1984)
- 18 September – Jean-Michel Defaye, musician (d. 2025)
- 1 October – Manuel Busto, French racing cyclist (d. 2017)
- 13 October – Liliane Montevecchi, French-Italian actress, dancer and singer (d. 2018)
- 24 October - Pierre-Gilles de Gennes, physicist and the Nobel Prize laureate in Physics in 1991 (d. 2007)
- 27 October - Jean-Pierre Cassel, actor (d. 2007)
- 30 October - Louis Malle, film director (d. 1995)
- 3 November – Guillaume Bieganski, French footballer (d. 2016)
- 8 November – Stéphane Audran, French actress (d. 2018)
- 9 November – Serge Roy, French footballer (d. 2025)
- 20 November – André Soltner, chef and food writer (d. 2025)
- 29 November - Jacques Chirac, President of France (d. 2019)
- 1 December - Stéphane Bruey, international soccer player (d. 2005)
- 2 December - Michel Guerry, politician
- 15 December - Charles Bozon, alpine skier and world champion (d. 1964)
- 21 December - Jean-Jacques Guyon, equestrian (d. 2017)

=== Full date unknown ===
- André Pascal, songwriter and composer (d. 2001)

== Deaths ==
=== January to June ===
- 7 January - André Maginot, politician, advocate of the Maginot Line (born 1877)
- February - Charles Gide, economist and historian of economic thought (born 1847)
- 16 February
  - Ferdinand Buisson, academic. pacifist, politician, awarded Nobel Peace Prize in 1927 (born 1841)
  - Gustave-Auguste Ferrié, radio pioneer and army general (born 1868)
- 28 February - Guillaume Bigourdan, astronomer (born 1851)
- 7 March - Aristide Briand, statesman, Prime Minister and Nobel Peace Prize winner (born 1862)
- 3 May - Henri de Gaulle, bureaucrat, teacher and father of Charles de Gaulle (born 1848)
- 24 March – Frantz Reichel, Olympic gold medalist in rugby (born 1871)
- 7 May - Paul Doumer, President of France (assassinated) (born 1857)
- 9 June - Émile Friant, painter (born 1863)
- 29 June - Jean Marie Charles Abadie, ophthalmologist (born 1842)

=== July to December ===
- 5 July - René-Louis Baire, mathematician (born 1874)
- 18 July - Jean Jules Jusserand, author and diplomat (born 1855)
- 20 July - René Bazin, novelist (born 1853)
- 23 September - Jules Chéret, painter and lithographer (born 1836)
- 24 September – Rose Combe, writer and railway worker (born 1883)
- 15 October - Élisabeth Renaud, teacher, socialist activist, and feminist (born 1846)
- 29 October - Rodolphe d'Erlanger, painter and musicologist (born 1872)

=== Full date unknown ===
- Léon Bouly, inventor who devised and created the cinématographe (born 1872)

== See also ==
- Interwar France
- List of French films of 1932
