= 1898 in France =

- Decades: 1870s; 1880s; 1890s; 1900s; 1910s
- See also: History of France; Timeline of French history; List of years in France

Events from the year 1898 in France.

== Incumbents ==
- President: Félix Faure
- President of the Council of Ministers:
  - until 28 June: Jules Méline
  - 28 June-31 October: Henri Brisson
  - starting 31 October: Charles Dupuy

== Events ==
- 13 January – Émile Zola's open letter to President Félix Faure on the Dreyfus affair, J'Accuse...!, is published on the front page of the Paris daily newspaper L'Aurore, accusing the French government of antisemitism and wrongfully imprisoning Alfred Dreyfus.
- 7 February – Zola is brought to trial for criminal libel for publishing J'accuse.
- 23 February – Zola is imprisoned for J'accuse. Following dismissal of his appeal he flees to London (arriving on 19 July) to escape further punishment.
- March – Canon de 75 modèle 1897 adopted as the standard French Army field artillery piece.
- 8 May – Legislative election held.
- 22 May – Legislative election held.
- 27 May – The Leased Territory of Guangzhouwan (Kwang-Chou-Wan or Territoire de Kouang-Tchéou-Wan) is leased by China to France, according to the Treaty of 12 April 1892, forming part of French Indochina.
- September – Fashoda Incident between Britain and France in Eastern Africa.
- 10 October – French military mission leaves for Chad.
- November – Voulet–Chanoine Mission, a military mission from Senegal to Chad.
- 10 December – The Treaty of Paris ending the Spanish–American War is signed in Paris.
- 18 December – Gaston de Chasseloup-Laubat sets the first official land speed record in an automobile, averaging 63.15 km/h (39.24 mph) over 1 km (0.62 mi) at Achères, Yvelines.
- 26 December – Marie and Pierre Curie announce discovery of a substance they call radium.
- Dr Louis Perrier buys the spring at Vergèze and operates a commercial spa there, also bottling the water for sale.
- Henri Matisse paints Le Mur Rose

== Literature ==
- Joris-Karl Huysmans - La Cathédrale
- Pierre Louÿs - La Femme et le pantin
- Jules Verne - Le Superbe Orénoque

== Births ==
=== January to March ===
- 27 January – Robert Levasseur, rugby union player (died 1974)
- 8 February – Jean Charlot, painter and illustrator (died 1979)
- 11 February – Henri de La Falaise, translator, film director and film producer (died 1972)
- 18 February – Adolphe Jauréguy, rugby union player (died 1977)
- 4 March – Georges Dumézil, philologist (died 1986)
- 8 March – Georges Gimel, painter (died 1962)
- 25 March – Marcelle Narbonne, supercentenarian, oldest European living person (died 2012)

=== April to June ===
- 6 April – Jeanne Hébuterne, artist and subject for Amedeo Modigliani (died 1920)
- 12 April - Lily Pons, French-American operatic soprano (died 1976 in the United States)
- 5 May – Lise Deharme, née Anne-Marie Hirtz, writer (died 1979)
- 15 May – Arletty, singer and actress (died 1992)
- 16 May – Jean Fautrier, painter and sculptor (died 1964)
- 4 June – Émilienne Moreau-Evrard, hero of World War I and in French Resistance during World War II (died 1971)
- 5 June – Guy La Chambre, politician (died 1975)
- 15 June – André Debry, one of the last surviving French veterans of World War I (died 2005)
- 29 June – Yvonne Lefébure, pianist (died 1986)

=== July to September ===
- 5 July
  - André Badonnel, entomologist (died 1991)
  - André Chilo, rugby union player (died 1982)
  - Robert Lacoste, politician (died 1989)
- 10 July – Pierre Mollaret, neurologist (died 1987)
- 19 July – Étienne Decroux, actor and mime (died 1991)
- 31 July – Henri Navarre, General (died 1983)
- 13 August – Jean Borotra, tennis player (died 1994)
- 16 August – Jean Vallette d'Osia, Lieutenant General (died 2000)
- 13 September – Roger Désormière, conductor (died 1963)
- 15 September – Philippe Hériat, novelist, playwright and actor (died 1971)
- 16 September – Louis Jacquinot, lawyer and politician (died 1993)
- 30 September – Renée Adorée, actress (died 1933)

=== October to December ===
- 10 October
  - Lilly Daché, milliner and fashion designer (died 1989)
  - Marie-Pierre Kœnig, general and politician (died 1970)
  - Georges Malkine, painter (died 1970)
- 14 October – Maurice Martenot, cellist and inventor (died 1980)
- 25 October – René-Yves Creston, artist, designer and ethnographer (died 1964)
- 27 October – Élisabeth d'Ayen, tennis player (died 1969)
- 31 October
  - Édouard Depreux, journalist, essayist and politician (died 1981)
  - Alfred Sauvy, demographer, anthropologist and historian (died 1990)
- 11 November – René Clair, filmmaker (died 1981)
- 17 November – Maurice Journeau, composer (died 1999)
- 5 December – Henri Gouhier, philosopher, historian of philosophy and literary critic (died 1994)

=== Full date unknown ===
- Marcel Boucher, jewellery designer (died 1965)
- Édouard Joly, aircraft designer (died 1982)

== Deaths ==
- 18 April – Gustave Moreau, painter (born 1826)
- 21 April – Théodore Gouvy, composer (born 1819)
- 7 July – Louis Buffet, statesman (born 1818)
- 3 August – Charles Garnier, architect (born 1825)
- 8 August – Eugène Boudin, painter (born 1824)
- 9 September – Stéphane Mallarmé, poet and critic (born 1842)
- 25 September – Louis Laurent Gabriel de Mortillet, anthropologist (born 1821)
- 16 October – Jules-Eugène Lenepveu, painter (born 1819)
- 24 October – Pierre Puvis de Chavannes, painter (born 1824)
- 17 November – Auguste-François Maunoury, Hellenist and exegete (born 1811)

=== Full date unknown ===
- Jean-André Cuoq, philologist (born 1821)

== See also ==
- List of French films before 1910
