= 1819 in France =

- Decades: 1790s; 1800s; 1810s; 1820s; 1830s
- See also: History of France; Timeline of French history; List of years in France

Events from the year 1819 in France.

== Incumbents ==
- Monarch – Louis XVIII
- Prime Minister – Jean-Joseph, Marquis Dessolles (until 19 November), then Élie, duc Decazes

== Events ==
- 6 April–21 June - French slave ship Le Rodeur sails from Bonny in West Africa to Guadeloupe in the West Indies; in the course of the transatlantic voyage all onboard become blind, and slaves are thrown overboard as a consequence.
- May: enactment of the Serre laws, which governed press freedom for much of the nineteenth century
- 12 May – Trial begins in Paris of Marie André Cantillon and Joseph Stanislas Marinet accused of involvement in the plot to assassinate the Duke of Wellington the previous February. Both men are ultimately acquitted.
- 25 August – An Exposition promoting French industry opens at the Louvre, attracting over a hundred thousand visitors over the next month.

== Arts and literature ==
- Théodore Géricault's painting The Raft of the Medusa (Le Radeau de la Méduse) is first exhibited at Salon of 1819 in Paris.

== Births ==
=== January to June ===
- 10 January - Pierre Édouard Frère, painter (died 1886)
- 31 January - Jean-Augustin Barral, agronomist (died 1884)
- 7 February - Augustin Marie Morvan, physician, politician and writer (died 1897)
- 15 February - Louis Figuier, scientist and writer (died 1894)
- 1 March - François-Marie-Benjamin Richard, Archbishop of Paris (died 1908)
- 6 March - Émile Blanchard, zoologist and entomologist (died 1900)
- 4 April - Louis Gustave Vapereau, writer and lexicographer (died 1906)
- 19 April - Marie Firmin Bocourt, zoologist and artist (died 1904)
- 29 May - Louis, duc de Decazes, statesman (died 1886)
- 10 June - Gustave Courbet, painter (died 1877)
- 28 June - Henri Harpignies, painter (died 1916)

=== July to September ===
- 2 July - Charles-Louis Hanon, piano pedagogue and composer (died 1900)
- 3 July - Théodore Gouvy, composer (died 1898)
- 22 July - Ernest Cosson, botanist (died 1889)
- 14 August - Agenor, duc de Gramont, diplomat and statesman (died 1880)
- 26 August - Louis Adolphe Cochery, politician and journalist (died 1900)
- 15 September - Jules Etienne Pasdeloup, conductor (died 1887)
- 17 September - Jeanne Sylvanie Arnould-Plessy, actress (died 1897)
- 18 September - Léon Foucault, physicist (died 1868)
- 20 September - Théodore Chassériau, painter (died 1856)
- 21 September - Princess Louise Marie Thérèse of France, Petite-Fille de France (died 1864)
- 23 September - Hippolyte Fizeau, physicist (died 1896)
- 28 September - Aimé Millet, sculptor (died 1891)

=== October to December ===
- 19 October - Ardant du Picq, Colonel and military theorist (died 1870)
- 19 November
  - Émile Deschanel, author and politician (died 1904)
  - Auguste Vacquerie, journalist and man of letters (died 1895)
- 22 December - Pierre Ossian Bonnet, mathematician (died 1892)

=== Full date unknown ===
- Nicolas Édouard Delabarre-Duparcq, military critic and historian (died 1893)
- Jules Eugène Lenepveu, painter (died 1898)

== Deaths ==
=== January to June ===
- 10 January - Claude de Beauharnais, politician (born 1756)
- 12 January - André Morellet, economist and writer (born 1727)
- 25 January - Théodore-Pierre Bertin, writer, introduced modern shorthand to France (born 1751)
- 26 January - Médéric Louis Élie Moreau de Saint-Méry, historian and lawyer (born 1750)
- 16 February - Pierre-Henri de Valenciennes, painter (born 1750)
- 17 February - Philippe Louis de Noailles, politician (born 1752)
- 11 March - Michel-Louis-Étienne Regnaud de Saint-Jean d'Angély, politician (born 1761)
- 18 April - Georges Antoine Chabot, jurist and statesman (born 1758)
- 29 May - Jean Jacques Étienne Lucas, Navy officer and hero of the Battle of Trafalgar (born 1764)
- 3 June - Jacques Nicolas Billaud-Varenne, Revolutionary figure (born 1756)

=== July to December ===
- 6 July - Sophie Blanchard, balloonist, first woman killed in an aviation accident (born 1778)
- 18 July - Barthélemy Faujas de Saint-Fond, geologist and traveller (born 1741)
- 1 August - Pierre-Adrien Pâris, architect, painter and designer (born 1745)
- 29 October - François Guillaume Ducray-Duminil, novelist (born 1761)
- 24 December - Jean-Mathieu-Philibert Sérurier, Marshal of France (born 1742)

=== Full date unknown ===
- Charles-Honoré Lannuier, cabinetmaker in America (born 1779)
