= 1874 in France =

- Decades: 1850s; 1860s; 1870s; 1880s; 1890s
- See also: History of France; Timeline of French history; List of years in France

Events from the year 1874 in France.

== Incumbents ==
- President: Patrice de MacMahon, Duke of Magenta
- President of the Council of Ministers: Albert, duc de Broglie (until 22 May), Ernest Courtot de Cissey (starting 22 May)

== Events ==
- 23 January – Camille Saint-Saëns' composition Danse Macabre is premiered.
- 15 March – France and the Nguyễn dynasty of Vietnam sign the Second Treaty of Saigon, further recognizing the full sovereignty of France over Cochinchina.
- 25 April – Louis Leroy reviews the First Impressionist Exhibition, held in Paris, and coins the term with reference to Claude Monet's Impression, Sunrise.

== Literature ==
- Alphonse Daudet - Fromont jeune et Risler aîné
- Gustave Flaubert - La Tentation de Saint Antoine
- Victor Hugo - Quatrevingt-treize
- Jules Verne - L'Île mystérieuse
- Émile Zola - La Conquête de Plassans

== Music ==
- Jacques Offenbach - Bagatelle / Madame l'archiduc

== Births ==
=== January to June ===
- 21 January – René-Louis Baire, mathematician (died 1932)
- 19 February – Rose Gelbert, golfer (died 1956)
- 22 March – Jean Cau, rower.
- 3 May – François Coty, perfume manufacturer (died 1934)
- 14 May – Polaire (Emilie Marie Bouchaud), singer and actress (died 1939)

=== July to December ===
- 29 July – Auguste Giroux, rugby union player (died 1953)
- 4 September – Jean d'Orléans, duc de Guise, great-grandson of Louis Philippe I, King of the French (died 1940)
- 4 October – Joseph d'Arbaud, poet (died 1950)
- 25 October – Henri Bénard, physicist (died 1939)
- 2 November – Georges Andrique, painter (died 1964)
- 14 November – André-Gaston Prételat, general (died 1969)
- 5 December – Henriette Caillaux, socialite and assassin (died 1943)
- 6 December – Lucien Démanet, gymnast
- 24 December – Yves Le Febvre, writer and politician (died 1959)

== Deaths ==
- 8 January – Abbé Charles Étienne Brasseur de Bourbourg, writer, historian (born 1814)
- 9 February – Jules Michelet, historian (born 1798)
- 26 August – Julie-Victoire Daubié, journalist (born 1824)
- 12 September – François Guizot, Prime Minister (born 1787)
- 22 December – Louis Aubert-Roche, physician (born 1818)
