= 1818 in France =

- Decades: 1790s; 1800s; 1810s; 1820s; 1830s
- See also: History of France; Timeline of French history; List of years in France

Events from the year 1818 in France.

== Incumbents ==
- Monarch – Louis XVIII
- Prime Minister – Armand-Emmanuel de Vignerot du Plessis, Duc de Richelieu (until 29 December), then Jean-Joseph, Marquis Dessolles

== Events ==
- 11 February - Marie André Cantillon attempts to assassinate the Duke of Wellington, commander of troops occupying France, in Paris.
- 29 July - Physicist Augustin-Jean Fresnel submits his prizewinning "Memoir on the Diffraction of Light" to the French Academy of Sciences, precisely accounting for the limited extent to which light spreads into shadows, and thereby demolishing the oldest objection to the wave theory of light.
- 28 August – The Equestrian statue of Henry IV is inaugurated in Paris, replacing an earlier one that had been destroyed during the French Revolution.
- 1 October - Congress of Aix-la-Chapelle is convened.
- 5 October - Claudine Thévenet (known as Mary of St. Ignatius) founds the Roman Catholic order Religieuses de Jésus-Marie ("Religious of Jesus And Mary") in Lyon.
- 30 November – The Allied Occupation of France (1815-1818) ends as the last troops depart in line with the agreement at Aix-la-Chapelle.

== Births ==
=== January to June ===
- 26 January - Amédée de Noé, caricaturist and lithographer (died 1879).
- 7 February - François Paul Meurice, dramatist (died 1905).
- 18 May - Eugène Bouchut, physician (died 1891).
- 3 June - Louis Faidherbe, general and colonial administrator (died 1889).
- 4 June - Élie-Abel Carrière, botanist (died 1896).
- 13 June - Jean-Jules Allasseur, sculptor (died 1903).
- 18 June - Charles Gounod, composer (died 1893).

=== July to December ===
- 8 August - Joseph Roumanille, poet (died 1891).
- 12 August - Edmond-Frederic Le Blant, archaeologist and historian (died 1897).
- 14 August - François d'Orléans, prince de Joinville, admiral (died 1900).
- 18 August - Henri Le Secq, painter and photographer (died 1882).
- 13 September - Gustave Aimard, traveller and writer (died 1883).
- 14 October - Jacques Marie François Bigot, naturalist and entomologist (died 1893).
- 26 October - Louis Buffet, statesman (died 1898).
- 26 November - Louis Aubert-Roche, physician (died 1874)

=== Full date unknown ===
- Denis Vrain-Lucas, forger (died 1880).

== Deaths ==
- 30 January - Claude Matthieu, Count Gardane, general and diplomat (born 1766).
- 23 April - Jean-Armand de Bessuéjouls Roquelaure, Archbishop of Mechelen, Belgium (born 1721).
- 1 May - François-Joseph Bélanger, architect and decorator (born 1744).
- 28 July - Gaspard Monge, mathematician (born 1746).
- 19 October
  - André Antoine Bernard, lawyer and revolutionary (born 1751).
  - Antoine-François Bertrand de Molleville, government minister (born 1744).
- 28 October - Henri Jacques Guillaume Clarke, politician and Marshal of France (born 1765).
- 25 December - Catherine-Dominique de Pérignon, Marshal of France (born 1754).
- Full date unknown - Adrien-Nicolas Piédefer, marquis de La Salle, writer and cavalry officer (born 1735).
