= 1891 in France =

- Decades: 1870s; 1880s; 1890s; 1900s; 1910s
- See also: History of France; Timeline of French history; List of years in France

Events from the year 1891 in France.

== Incumbents ==
- President: Marie François Sadi Carnot
- President of the Council of Ministers: Charles de Freycinet

== Events ==
- 1 May – Fusillade de Fourmies, nine killed and thirty wounded when troops fire on workers' May Day demonstration in support of eight-hour workday in Fourmies.
- 27 August – France and Russia conclude defensive alliance.
- Gustave Moreau becomes a professor at the École des Beaux-Arts in Paris.
- Henri Matisse begins his studies as an artist at École des Beaux-Arts

== Literature ==
- Maurice Barrès - Le Culte du moi
- Joris-Karl Huysmans - Là-bas
- Jules Verne - Mistress Branican
- Émile Zola - L'Argent

== Music ==
- Claude Debussy
  - Ballade
  - Danse
  - Deux arabesques
  - Rêverie
  - Valse romantique
- Gabriel Fauré - 5 Mélodies, Op. 58
- Charles Gounod - Saint Francois d'Assise
- Jules Massenet - Le Mage
- Camille Saint-Saëns - Africa

== Births ==
=== January to June ===
- 2 January – Didier Daurat, aviation pioneer (died 1969)
- 14 January – Félix Goethals, cyclist (died 1962)
- 19 April – Françoise Rosay, actress (died 1974)
- 17 May – Roger Blaizot, General (died 1981)

=== July to September ===
- 11 July
  - Gabriel Benoist, writer (died 1964)
  - Joseph Sadi-Lecointe, aviator (died 1944)
- 21 July – Marcel-Frédéric Lubin-Lebrère, rugby union player (died 1972)
- 1 August – Charles Ritz, hotelier and fly fisherman (died 1976)
- 6 August – Yvette Andréyor, actress (died 1962)
- 9 August – Joseph-Marie Martin, cardinal (died 1976)
- 15 August – Jean De Briac, actor (died 1970)
- 3 September – Marcel Grandjany, harpist and composer (died 1975)
- 10 September – Raymond Abescat, oldest man in France and oldest veteran in France at the time of his death (died 2001)
- 26 September – Charles Münch, conductor and violinist (died 1968)

=== October to December ===
- 10 October – Raymond Bernard, filmmaker (died 1977)
- 17 November – Jean Del Val, actor (died 1975)
- 15 December – Martial Guéroult, philosopher and historian of philosophy (died 1976)
- 23 December – Xavier Vallat, politician and Commissioner-General for Jewish Questions in Vichy France (died 1972)
- 26 December – Jean Galtier-Boissière, writer, polemist and journalist (died 1966)
- 30 December – Antoine Pinay, politician and Prime Minister of France (died 1994)

== Deaths ==
=== January to June ===
- 14 January – Aimé Millet, sculptor (born 1819)
- 16 January – Léo Delibes, composer (born 1836)
- 21 January – Jean-Louis-Ernest Meissonier, painter and sculptor (born 1815)
- 15 March – Théodore de Banville, poet and writer (born 1823)
- 29 March – Armand-François-Marie de Charbonnel, Bishop of Toronto (born 1802)
- 29 March – Georges-Pierre Seurat, painter (born 1859)
- 24 May – Joseph Roumanille, poet (born 1818)
- 17 June – Théophile Nicolas Noblot, politician (born 1824)

=== July to December ===
- 7 July – Célestin Joseph Félix, Jesuit (born 1810)
- 20 August – Leopold Chasseriau, planter (born 1825)
- 29 August – Pierre Lallement, bicycle inventor (b. c. 1843)
- 5 September – Elie Delaunay, painter (born 1828)
- 30 September – Georges Ernest Boulanger, general and politician (born 1837)
- 3 October – Édouard Lucas, mathematician (born 1842)
- 10 November – Arthur Rimbaud, poet (born 1854)
- 26 November – Eugène Bouchut, physician (born 1818)
- 12 December – Charles Émile Freppel, Bishop and politician (born 1827)
- December – Émile Bayard, illustrator (born 1837)
