= 1823 in France =

- Decades: 1800s; 1810s; 1820s; 1830s; 1840s
- See also: History of France; Timeline of French history; List of years in France

Events from the year 1823 in France.

== Incumbents ==
- Monarch – Louis XVIII
- Prime Minister – Joseph de Villèle

== Events ==
- 22 January - By secret treaty signed at the Congress of Verona, the Quintuple Alliance gives France a mandate to invade Spain for the purpose of restoring Ferdinand VII (who has been captured by armed revolutionary liberals) as absolute monarch of the country.
- 7 April - French forces, the "Hundred Thousand Sons of Saint Louis", cross the Spanish border.
- 23 May - The rebel Spanish government withdraws from Madrid to Seville following French attacks.
- 31 August - Battle of Trocadero: French infantry capture the fort of Trocadero and turn its guns on Cádiz.
- 30 September - Cádiz surrenders to the French and Ferdinand VII of Spain is restored to his throne as absolute monarch.
- 5 November - The "Hundred Thousand Sons of Saint Louis" begin their withdrawal from Spain, although a French army of occupation remains in the country until 1828.

== Arts and literature ==
- The debut novel by Victor Hugo, Hans of Iceland, is published.

== Births ==
=== January to June ===
- 27 January - Édouard Lalo, composer (died 1892)
- 28 February - Ernest Renan, Biblical scholar, philosopher and writer (died 1892)
- 4 March - Casimir Marie Gaudibert, astronomer and selenographer (died 1901)
- 14 March - Théodore de Banville, poet and writer (died 1891)
- 18 March - Antoine Chanzy, general and governor of Algeria (died 1883)
- 21 March - Jules Émile Planchon, botanist (died 1888)
- 13 April - Charles Joseph Marty-Laveaux, literary scholar (died 1899)
- 21 June - Jean Chacornac, astronomer (died 1873)
- 28 June - Jules Adenis, dramatist and opera librettist (died 1900)

=== July to December ===
- 12 July - Jacques-Léonard Maillet, sculptor (died 1894)
- 18 July - Félix du Temple de la Croix, Army captain, aviation pioneer (died 1894)
- 8 August - Théodule Ribot, realist painter (died 1891)
- 15 August - Marie-Louis-Antoine-Gaston Boissier, classical scholar (died 1908)
- 1 September - Louis Gustave Ricard, painter (died 1873)
- 28 September - Alexandre Cabanel, painter (died 1889)
- 8 October - Louis-Frédéric Brugère, professor of apologetics and church history (died 1888)
- 21 October - Edme-Armand-Gaston d'Audiffret-Pasquier, politician (died 1905)
- 8 November - Joseph Monier, inventor (died 1906)
- 22 December - Jean Henri Fabre, entomologist (died 1915)

=== Full date unknown ===
- Théodore Barrière, dramatist (died 1877)
- Antoine Fauchery, photographer (died 1862)

== Deaths ==
=== January to June ===
- 3 January - Jean Joseph Amable Humbert, general, led a failed invasion of Ireland (born 1755)
- 22 January - Jean-Pierre, Count of Montalivet, statesman and peer (born 1766)
- 16 February - Pierre Paul Prud'hon, painter and draughtsman (born 1758)
- 1 March - Pierre-Jean Garat, opera singer (born 1764)
- 14 March - Charles François Dumouriez, general (born 1739)
- 18 March - Jean-Baptiste Bréval, cellist and composer (born 1753)
- 27 March - Jacques-Michel Hurel de Lamare, cellist (born 1772)
- 1 June - Louis-Nicolas Davout, Marshal of France (born 1770)
- 27 June - Pierre Antoine Delalande, naturalist and explorer (born 1787)

=== July to December ===
- 2 August - Lazare Carnot, politician, engineer and mathematician (born 1753)
- 16 August - Louis-Martin Berthault, architect (born 1770)
- 18 August - André-Jacques Garnerin, inventor of the frameless parachute (born 1769)
- 22 August - Lazare Carnot, general, politician and mathematician (born 1753)
- 18 November - Jean-Nicolas Pache, politician (born 1746)

=== Full date unknown ===
- Antoine-François Callet, painter (born 1741)
