= 1896 in France =

- Decades: 1870s; 1880s; 1890s; 1900s; 1910s
- See also: History of France; Timeline of French history; List of years in France

Events from the year 1896 in France.

== Incumbents ==
- President: Felix Faure
- President of the Council of Ministers: Léon Bourgeois (until 29 April), Jules Méline (starting 29 April)

== Events ==
- 11 February – English writer Oscar Wilde's play Salomé (1891) has its stage première (while Wilde is in prison), in its original French, by Lugné-Poe's Théâtre de l'Œuvre company in Paris, perhaps at the Comédie-Parisienne.
- 28 September – Pathé Frères, one of the oldest film companies, is founded by the brothers Charles, Théophile, Émile and Jacques Pathé.
- 30 September – Italy and France sign a treaty whereby Italy virtually recognizes Tunisia as a French dependency.
- 10 December – Alfred Jarry's play Ubu Roi (first published this Spring in Le Livre d'art) is premièred by the Théâtre de l'Œuvre in Paris. The opening word, "Merdre!", triggers disturbances and the play is not performed again in the author's lifetime.
- France establishes an administrative post at Abengourou, Ivory Coast.
- At Giverny Claude Monet begins painting his Mornings on the Seine series, which will continue through 1897.

== Literature ==
- Pierre Louÿs - Aphrodite: mœurs antiques
- Jules Verne
  - Clovis Dardentor
  - Face au drapeau

== Sport ==
- Racing Club de Lyon, a football club predecessor to Olympique Lyonnais, is officially founded.

== Births ==
=== January to June ===
- 4 January – André Masson, artist (died 1987)
- 19 February – André Breton, writer, poet, and surrealist theorist (died 1966)
- 20 February – Henri de Lubac, Jesuit priest and theologian (died 1991)
- 19 March – Jean Wiener, pianist and composer (died 1982)
- 18 April – Job de Roincé, journalist and writer (died 1981)
- 20 April – Henry de Montherlant, essayist, novelist and playwright (died 1972)

=== July to September ===
- 16 July – Léon Weil, World War I veteran (died 2006)
- 18 July – Jean Dufay, astronomer (died 1967)
- 21 July – Jean Rivier, composer (died 1987)
- 27 July – Henri Longchambon, politician (died 1969)
- 12 August – Alexis Tendil, World War I veteran (died 2005)
- 15 August – Marie Besnard, accused serial poisoner (died 1980)
- 23 August – Jacques Rueff, economist and adviser to the French Government (died 1978)
- 1 September – André Hunebelle, film director (died 1985)
- 14 September – Georges Piot, rower and Olympic medallist (died 1980)
- September – Elsa Triolet, writer (died 1970)

=== October to December ===
- 2 October – Jacques Duclos, politician (died 1975)
- 8 October – Julien Duvivier, film director (died 1967)
- 15 October – Célestin Freinet, pedagogue, and educational reformer (died 1966)
- 18 October – Marie-Laurence Quatrefages, politician and Righteous Among the Nations (died 1976)
- 26 October – Louis Renou, indologist (died 1966)
- 18 November – Pierre Couderc, screenwriter, actor, acrobat and film producer (died 1966)
- 29 December – Philippe Étancelin, motor racing driver (died 1981)

=== Full date unknown ===
- Albert Besson, hygienist and physician (died 1965)
- Lisette de Brinon, socialite and collaborator (died 1982)

== Deaths ==
=== January to June ===
- 8 January – Paul Verlaine, poet (born 1844)
- 26 February – Arsène Houssaye, novelist and poet (born 1815)
- 5 May – Auguste Sallé, traveller and entomologist (born 1820)
- 29 May – Gabriel Auguste Daubrée, geologist (born 1814)
- 26 June – Louis, Duke of Nemours, second son of King Louis-Philippe of France (born 1814)

=== July to December ===
- 10 July – Joseph-Christian-Ernest Bourret, Cardinal (born 1827)
- 16 July – Edmond de Goncourt, writer, critic and book publisher (born 1822)
- 17 August – Élie-Abel Carrière, botanist (born 1818)
- 18 September – Hippolyte Fizeau, physicist (born 1819)
- 7 October – Louis Jules Trochu, soldier and statesman (born 1815)
- 26 October – Paul-Armand Challemel-Lacour, statesman (born 1827)
- 17 December – Paul Arène, poet and writer (born 1843)

== See also ==
- List of French films before 1910
