= 1827 in France =

- Decades: 1800s; 1810s; 1820s; 1830s; 1840s
- See also: History of France; Timeline of French history; List of years in France

Events from the year 1827 in France.

== Incumbents ==
- Monarch – Charles X
- Prime Minister – Joseph de Villèle

== Events ==
- April - Ottoman Algeria: Husain Dei slaps the French consul, Decalina, on the face, eventually leading to war and French rule in Algeria.
- 6 July - Treaty of London, signed by the United Kingdom, France and Russia calling upon Greece and the Ottoman Empire to cease hostilities.
- 20 October - Battle of Navarino: A combined British, French and Russian naval force destroys a combined Ottoman and Egyptian armada.
- 17 November - Legislative Election held for the third legislature of the Second Restoration.
- 24 November - Legislative Election held.

== Births ==
=== January to June ===
- 28 January - Jean Antoine Villemin, physician (died 1892)
- 1 February - Alphonse James de Rothschild, banker and philanthropist (died 1905)
- 1 May - Jules Adolphe Aimé Louis Breton, painter (died 1906)
- 11 May - Jean-Baptiste Carpeaux, sculptor and painter (died 1875)
- 19 May - Paul-Armand Challemel-Lacour, statesman (died 1896)
- 1 June - Charles Émile Freppel, Bishop and politician (died 1891)
- 24 June - Louis Brière de l'Isle, Military officer and colonial governor (died 1897)

=== July to September ===
- 11 July - Paul Bins, comte de Saint-Victor, author (died 1881)
- 12 July - Henri Rivière, Naval officer and writer (died 1883)
- 29 July - Louis Ratisbonne, writer and man of letters (died 1900)
- 16 September - Jean Albert Gaudry, geologist and palaeontologist (died 1908)
- 27 September - Pierre Tirard, politician (died 1893)

=== October to December ===
- 8 October - Francisque Sarcey, journalist and drama critic (died 1899)
- 25 October - Marcellin Berthelot, chemist and politician (died 1907)
- 1 November - Pierre Adolphe Adrien Doyon, dermatologist (died 1907)
- 23 November - Auguste Chauveau, professor and veterinarian (died 1917)
- 30 November - Henri Ernest Baillon, botanist and physician (died 1895)
- 5 December - Marie Henri d'Arbois de Jubainville, historian and philologist (died 1910)
- 7 December - Marc Monnier, writer (died 1885)
- 9 December - Joseph-Christian-Ernest Bourret, Cardinal (died 1896)
- 10 December - Jacques-Marie-Louis Monsabré, priest and orator (died 1907)
- 26 December - Étienne Léopold Trouvelot, artist, astronomer and amateur entomologist, introduces the gypsy moth into North America (died 1895)

== Deaths ==
=== January to June ===
- 13 January - Jean Denis, comte Lanjuinais, politician, lawyer, jurist, journalist and historian (born 1753)
- 15 January - Michel Mathieu Lecointe-Puyraveau, politician (born 1764)
- 30 January - Victor Marie du Pont, diplomat, then businessman in America (born 1767)
- 19 February - Armand Augustin Louis de Caulaincourt, General and diplomat (born 1773)
- 5 March - Pierre-Simon Laplace, mathematician and astronomer (born 1749)
- 5 March - Charles du Houx de Viomesnil, Marshal of France (born 1734)
- 27 March - François Alexandre Frédéric, duc de la Rochefoucauld-Liancourt, social reformer (born 1747)
- 6 May - François-Frédéric Lemot, sculptor (born 1772)
- 31 May - Pierre Louis Prieur, politician (born 1756)

=== July to December ===
- 8 July - Robert Surcouf, privateer, businessman and slave-trader (born 1773)
- 14 July - Augustin-Jean Fresnel, physicist (born 1788)
- 9 August - Marc-Antoine Madeleine Désaugiers, composer, dramatist and songwriter (born 1772)
- 20 August - Jacques-Antoine Manuel, politician and orator (born 1775)
- 13 September - Joseph-Geneviève de Puisaye, aristocrat (born 1755)

=== Full date unknown ===
- Jean-Nicolas Curély, Cavalry leader (born 1774)
