= 1879 in France =

- Decades: 1850s; 1860s; 1870s; 1880s; 1890s
- See also: History of France; Timeline of French history; List of years in France

Events from the year 1879 in France.

== Incumbents ==
- President: Patrice de MacMahon, Duke of Magenta (until 30 January) Jules Grévy (starting 30 January)
- President of the Council of Ministers:
  - until 4 February: Jules Armand Dufaure
  - 4 February-28 December: William Waddington.
  - starting 28 December: Charles de Freycinet

== Events ==
- April – Postman Ferdinand Cheval begins to build his Palais Idéal at Hauterives.
- 1 June – Napoléon Eugène, Prince Imperial (Napoléon IV), great-nephew of Napoléon Bonaparte, Bonapartist Pretender to the throne, dies in Africa during the Anglo-Zulu War.
- 17 July – Freycinet Plan enacted to extend rail and other transportation systems.
- "La Marseillaise" is restored as the French national anthem.

== Literature ==
- Joris-Karl Huysmans - Les Sœurs Vatard
- Pierre Loti - Aziyadé
- Albert Robida - Voyages très extraordinaires de Saturnin Farandoul
- Jules Verne
  - Les Cinq Cents Millions de la Bégum
  - Les Tribulations d'un Chinois en Chine

== Music ==
- Jacques Offenbach - La fille du tambour-major

== Births ==
- 22 January – Francis Picabia, painter and poet (died 1953)
- 4 February – Jacques Copeau, journalist, actor, playwright, director, teacher (died 1949)
- 23 March – René Jeannel, entomologist (died 1965)
- 20 April – Paul Poiret, fashion designer (died 1944)
- 5 June – René Pottier, cyclist, winner of 1906 Tour de France (died 1907)
- 9 June – Joseph Avenol, 2nd Secretary General of the League of Nations (died 1952)
- 1 July – Léon Jouhaux, trade union leader who received the Nobel Peace Prize in 1951 (died 1954)
- 13 July – Eugène Freyssinet, structural and civil engineer (died 1962)
- 11 September – Louis Coatalen, automobile engineer and racing driver (died 1962 in the United Kingdom)
- 23 September – Charles Camoin, painter (died 1965)
- 21 October – Joseph Canteloube, composer (died 1957)
- 17 December – Jean-Marie Charles Abrial, Admiral and Minister (died 1962)
- 31 December – Joseph Darnand, Bishop (died 1962)

== Deaths ==
- 10 February – Honoré Daumier, printmaker, caricaturist, painter and sculptor (born 1808)
- 25 February – Jean-Baptiste Glaire, Roman Catholic priest and Hebrew and Biblical scholar (born 1798)
- 2 March – Jules Bastide, publicist (born 1800)
- 30 March – Thomas Couture, painter and teacher (born 1815)
- 16 April - Bernadette Soubirous, nun and visionary of Lourdes apparitions (born 1844)
- 20 May – Pierre-Jules Mêne, sculptor (born 1810)
- 29 May – Pierre Adolphe Piorry, physician (born 1794)
- 1 June – Napoléon Eugène, Prince Imperial, only child of Emperor Napoleon III of France and his Empress consort Eugénie de Montijo (born 1856)
- 26 August – Charles Marie Edouard Chassaignac, physician (born 1805)
- 6 September – Amédée de Noé, caricaturist and lithographer (born 1818)
- 17 September – Eugène Viollet-le-Duc, architect and theorist (born 1814)
- 12 November – Jean-Charles Chenu, physician and naturalist (born 1808)
- 18 November
  - Michel Chevalier, engineer, statesman and economist (born 1806)
  - André Giroux, photographer and painter (born 1801)
- 19 November – Jean-Joseph Gaume, Roman Catholic theologian and author (born 1802)
- 29 December – Jean Étienne Bercé, entomologist (born 1803)
