= 1889 in France =

- Decades: 1860s; 1870s; 1880s; 1890s; 1900s
- See also: History of France; Timeline of French history; List of years in France

Events from the year 1889 in France.

== Incumbents ==
- President: Marie François Sadi Carnot
- President of the Council of Ministers: Charles Floquet (until 22 February), Pierre Tirard (starting 22 February)

== Events ==
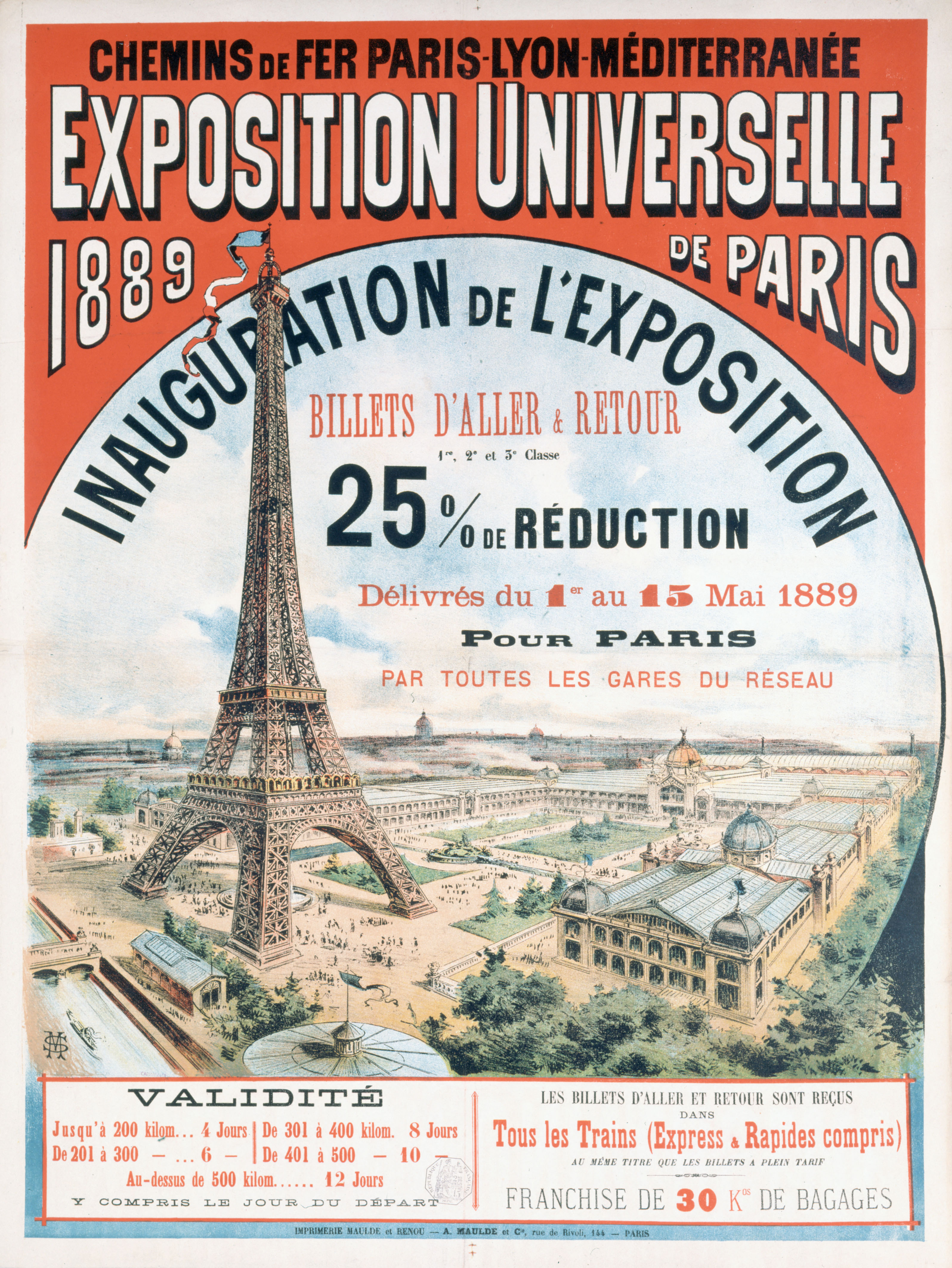
Poster

- 27 January – Former defense minister General Georges Boulanger contemplates a coup.
- 4 February – The Tribunal Civil de la Seine orders the winding up of the Panama Canal Company.
- 17 February – César Franck's Symphony in D minor is premièred at the Paris Conservatoire under the baton of Jules Garcin.
- 22 February – Charles Floquet's government falls on the question of constitutional revision and Pierre Tirard returns to office as Prime Minister.
- 31 March – The Eiffel Tower is inaugurated in Paris. At 300 m, its height exceeds the previous tallest structure in the world by 130 m.
- 1 April – Georges Boulanger flees to Brussels to avoid arrest for treason.
- 6 May – Exposition Universelle opens in Paris, with the Eiffel Tower as its entrance arch. The Galerie des machines, at 111 m, spans the longest interior space in the world at this time. The Exposition marks the centenary of the French Revolution.
- 8 May – Vincent van Gogh moves from Arles to the Saint-Paul asylum in Saint-Rémy-de-Provence, where in June he paints The Starry Night.
- 28 May – The Michelin rubber tire company is registered by Édouard and André Michelin in Clermont-Ferrand.
- 26 June – Bangui is founded in the French Congo.
- June – The Volpini Exhibition is staged by Paul Gauguin and other "peintures du Groupe impressioniste et synthétiste" in Paris.
- 14 July – International Workers Congresses of Paris open, and establish the Second International.
- 22 September – Legislative election first round held.
- 6 October
  - Legislative election second round held. The result is a victory for the Moderate Republicans and a decisive defeat for the Boulangists.
  - The Moulin Rouge cabaret opens in Paris.
- 31 October – Exposition Universelle closes.
- 17 November – The Brazilian Imperial Family is forced into exile in France.
- The fashion house of Lanvin is established in Paris by Jeanne Lanvin.

== Literature ==
- Paul Bourget - Le Disciple
- Jules Verne
  - Famille-sans-nom
  - Sans dessus dessous

== Music ==
- Claude Debussy - Petite Suite
- Gabriel Fauré - Shylock
- César Franck - Symphony in D minor
- Jules Massenet - Esclarmonde
- Camille Saint-Saëns - Les cloches du soir
- Erik Satie - Ogives

== Births ==
=== January to June ===
- 20 January – Jean Odin, politician (died 1975)
- 2 February – Jean de Lattre de Tassigny, general, military hero of World War II (died 1952)
- 24 February – Suzanne Bianchetti, actress (died 1936)
- 17 April – Marcel Boussac, entrepreneur and horse breeder (died 1980)
- 17 May – Marcel Moyse, flautist (died 1984)
- 24 May – Théophile Marie Brébant, military officer (died 1965)
- 13 June – Alfred Janniot, sculptor (died 1969)

=== July to December ===
- 5 July – Jean Cocteau, poet, novelist, dramatist, designer and filmmaker (died 1963)
- 22/23 July – Georges Bonnet, politician (died 1973)
- 7 August
  - Georges Thierry d'Argenlieu, Admiral (died 1964)
  - Léon Brillouin, physicist (died 1969)
- 15 August – Marthe Richard, prostitute, spy and politician (died 1982)
- 20 October – Suzanne Duchamp, painter (died 1963)
- 25 October – Abel Gance, film director, producer, writer, actor and editor (died 1981)
- 6 November – Gabriel Hanot, soccer player and journalist (died 1968)
- 26 November – Albert Dieudonné, actor, screenwriter, film director and novelist (died 1976)
- 5 December – Marie-Louise Damien, singer and actress (died 1978)
- 7 December – Gabriel Marcel, philosopher (died 1973)
- 17 December – Antoine Béthouart, General (died 1982)

== Deaths ==
- 23 January – Alexandre Cabanel, painter (born 1823)
- 16 March – Edmond Henri Adolphe Schérer, theologian, critic and politician (born 1815)
- 9 April – Jean-Baptiste Arban, cornetist and conductor (born 1825)
- 20 April – Charles Friedel, chemist and mineralogist (born 1832)
- 23 April – Jules Amédée Barbey d'Aurevilly, novelist and short story writer (born 1808)
- 24 April – Zulma Carraud, children's author (born 1796)
- 10 July – Joseph Projectus Machebeuf, French-American Catholic missionary and the first Bishop of Denver (born 1812)
- 19 August – Auguste Villiers de l'Isle-Adam, writer (born 1838)
- 29 September – Louis Faidherbe, general and colonial administrator (born 1818)
- 22 October – Philippe Ricord, physician (born 1800)
- 25 October – Émile Augier, dramatist (born 1820)
- 14 December – Jean Baptiste Lucien Buquet, entomologist (born 1807)
- 31 December – Ernest Cosson, botanist (born 1819)
