= Mollaret =

Mollaret is a surname. Notable people with the surname include:

- Axelle Mollaret (born 1992), French skyrunner and ski mountaineer
- Pierre Mollaret (1898–1987), French neurologist
