= 1875 in France =

- Decades: 1850s; 1860s; 1870s; 1880s; 1890s
- See also: History of France; Timeline of French history; List of years in France

Events from the year 1875 in France.

== Incumbents ==
- President: Patrice de MacMahon, Duke of Magenta
- President of the Council of Ministers: Ernest Courtot de Cissey (until 10 March), Louis Buffet (starting 10 March)

== Events ==
- 5 January – The Palais Garnier, one of the most famous opera houses in the world, is inaugurated as the home of the Paris Opera
- 3 March – The first performance of Bizet's Carmen at the Opéra Comique, Paris, 3 months before the composer's death.
- 20 May – Convention du Mètre signed in Paris.
- Cize–Bolozon viaduct opens to rail traffic across the Ain.
- Gallium is discovered by Paul Emile Lecoq de Boisbaudran.
- The Flammarion publishing firm is founded in Paris.

== Literature ==
- Jules Verne - Le Chancellor: Journal du passager J.-R. Kazallon
- Émile Zola - La Faute de l'Abbé Mouret

== Music ==
- Georges Bizet - Carmen
- Alexandre Luigini - Ballet égyptien
- Jules Massenet - Ève
- Jacques Offenbach
  - Geneviève de Brabant
  - Le voyage dans la lune
  - La créole
- Camille Saint-Saëns
  - Danse macabre
  - Piano Concerto No. 4
  - Piano Quartet in B-flat major

== Births ==
- 17 February – Fanny Clar, journalist and writer (died 1944)
- 21 February – Jeanne Calment, supercentenarian and the oldest living person ever documented in history (died 1997)
- 7 March – Maurice Ravel, composer and pianist (died 1937)
- 27 March – Cécile Vogt-Mugnier, neurologist (died 1962)
- 4 April – Pierre Monteux, conductor (died 1964)
- 5 April – Mistinguett, singer (born 1956)
- 27 April – Maurice, 6th duc de Broglie, physicist (died 1960)
- 28 June – Henri Lebesgue, mathematician (died 1941)
- 31 July – Jacques Villon, painter and printmaker (died 1963)
- 6 August – Marcel Labey, conductor and composer (died 1968)
- 27 September – Cléo de Mérode, dancer (died 1966)

=== Full date unknown ===
- Maurice Princet, mathematician and actuary (died 1973)

== Deaths ==
=== January to June ===
- 1 January – Jacques Crétineau-Joly, journalist and historian (born 1803)
- 3 January – Pierre Larousse, grammarian and lexicographer (born 1817)
- 10 January – Anton Melbye, Danish painter (born 1818)
- 20 January – Jean-François Millet, painter (born 1814)
- 22 February – Jean-Baptiste-Camille Corot, painter (born 1796)
- 1 March – Tristan Corbière, poet (born 1845)
- 25 March – Louis Amédée Achard, novelist (born 1814)
- 4 May – Michel Lévy, publisher (born 1821)
- 5 May – Alexandre Boreau, pharmacist and botanist (born 1803)
- 10 May – Gustave Thuret, botanist (born 1817)
- 31 May – Eliphas Levi, occult author and magician (born 1810)
- 3 June – Georges Bizet, composer and pianist (born 1838)
- 24 June – Henri Labrouste, architect (born 1801)
- 25 June – Antoine-Louis Barye, sculptor (born 1796)

=== July to December ===
- 11 August – Charles Rohault de Fleury, architect (born 1801)
- 25 August – Charles Auguste Frossard, general (born 1807)
- 12 October – Jean-Baptiste Carpeaux, sculptor and painter (born 1827)
- 24 October – Jacques Paul Migne, priest, theologian and publisher (born 1800)
- 17 November – Jacques-Marie-Achille Ginoulhiac, Bishop (born 1806)

=== Full date unknown ===
- Charles Auguste Désiré Filon, historian (born 1800)
