= 1897 in France =

- Decades: 1870s; 1880s; 1890s; 1900s; 1910s
- See also: History of France; Timeline of French history; List of years in France

Events from the year 1897 in France.

== Incumbents ==
- President: Félix Faure
- President of the Council of Ministers: Jules Méline

== Events ==
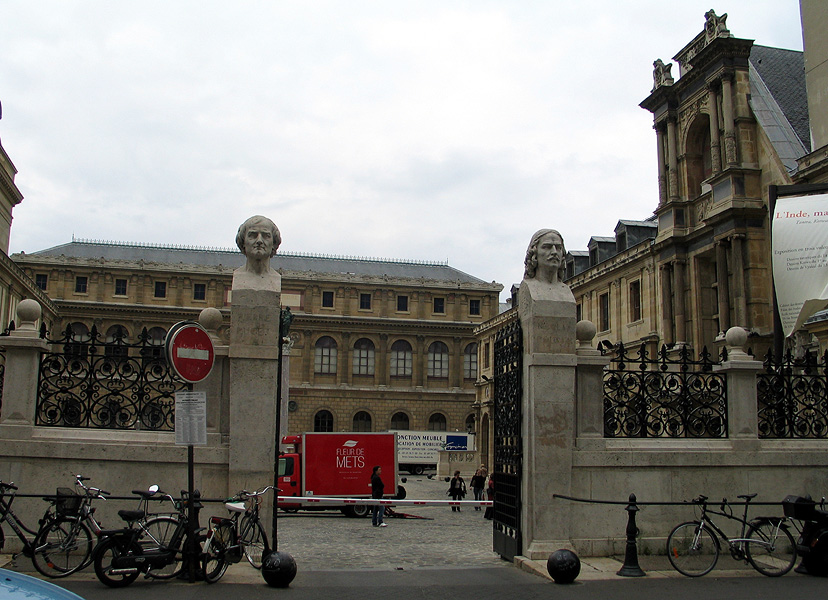
Women study at École des Beaux-Arts in Paris.

- 4 May – Bazar de la Charité Fire.
- 9 December – First issue of the feminist newspaper La Fronde is published by Marguerite Durand.
- 28 December – The play Cyrano de Bergerac, by Edmond Rostand, premieres in Paris.
- Alexandre Darracq begins manufacture of motor vehicles at A. Darracq et Cie in the Paris suburb of Suresnes.
- Women are admitted to study at the École des Beaux-Arts.
- At Giverny, Claude Monet begins painting his Water Lilies series, which will continue until the end of his life.

== Literature ==
- Maurice Barrès - Les Déracinés
- Léon Bloy - La Femme pauvre
- Pierre Loti - Ramuntcho
- Jules Verne - Le Sphinx des glaces

== Births ==
=== January to June ===
- 21 January – René Iché, sculptor (died 1954)
- 30 March – Raymond Borderie, film producer (died 1982)
- 4 April – Pierre Fresnay, actor (died 1975)
- 1 May – Aimée Antoinette Camus, botanist (died 1965)
- 27 May – Lucien Cailliet, composer, conductor, arranger and clarinetist (died 1985)

=== July to September ===
- 3 July – Charles Tillon, politician (died 1993)
- 12 July – Maurice Tabard, surrealist photographer (died 1984)
- 25 July – André Muffang, chess master (died 1989)
- 2 August – Philippe Soupault, poet, novelist, critic and political activist (died 1990)
- 15 August – Ludovic Arrachart, aviator (died 1933)
- 19 August – Norbert Casteret, caver and adventurer (died 1987)
- 10 September – Georges Bataille, writer (died 1962)
- 12 September
  - Pierre Courant, politician (died 1965)
  - Irène Joliot-Curie, scientist, shared the Nobel Prize for chemistry in 1935 (died 1956)
- 13 September – Michel Saint-Denis, actor, theatre director, and drama theorist (died 1971)

=== October to December ===
- 3 October – Louis Aragon, poet and novelist (died 1982)
- 16 October – Louis de Cazenave, at the time of his death, the oldest French poilu still alive (died 2008)
- 18 October – Martha Desrumeaux, militant communist and member of the French Resistance (died 1982)
- 24 November – François Ducaud-Bourget, priest (died 1984)
- 27 November – André Couder, optician and astronomer (died 1979)
- 3 December – André Marie, politician and Prime Minister of France (died 1974)
- 7 December – Lazare Ponticelli, last surviving official French veteran of the First World War (died 2008)
- 19 December – Louis Darquier de Pellepoix, Commissioner for Jewish Affairs under the Vichy Régime (died 1980)
- 20 December – Jacques de Bernonville, collaborationist and senior police officer in the Vichy regime (died 1972)
- 25 December – Noël Delberghe, water polo player and Olympic medallist (died 1965)

=== Undated ===
- Georges Périnal, cinematographer (died 1965)

== Deaths ==
- 13 January – Charles Brun, naval engineer (born 1821)
- 20 March – Augustin Marie Morvan, physician, politician and writer (born 1819)
- 18 May – François-Louis Français, painter (born 1814)
- 30 May – Jeanne Sylvanie Arnould-Plessy, actress (born 1819)
- 19 June – Louis Brière de l'Isle, Military officer and colonial governor (born 1827)
- 5 July – Edmond-Frederic Le Blant, archaeologist and historian (born 1818)
- 6 July – Henri Meilhac, dramatist and opera librettist (born 1830)
- 20 September – Louis Pierre Mouillard, aeronautical engineer (born 1834)
- 30 September – Thérèse de Lisieux, Roman Catholic Carmelite nun, canonised as a saint (born 1873)
- 6 November – Edouard Deldevez, violinist, conductor and composer (born 1817)
- 14 November – Thomas W. Evans, dentist (born 1823 in the United States)
- 28 November – Léonard-Léopold Forgemol de Bostquénard, general (born 1821)
- 6 December – Oscar Bardi de Fourtou, politician (born 1836)
- 16 December – Alphonse Daudet, novelist (born 1840)
