= 1822 in France =

- Decades: 1800s; 1810s; 1820s; 1830s; 1840s
- See also: History of France; Timeline of French history; List of years in France

Events from the year 1822 in France.

== Incumbents ==
- Monarch – Louis XVIII
- Prime Minister – Joseph de Villèle

== Events ==
- 24 April – Salon of 1822 opens at the Louvre in Paris
- 20 October - Congress of Verona, at which Russia, Austria and Prussia approve French intervention in Spain.

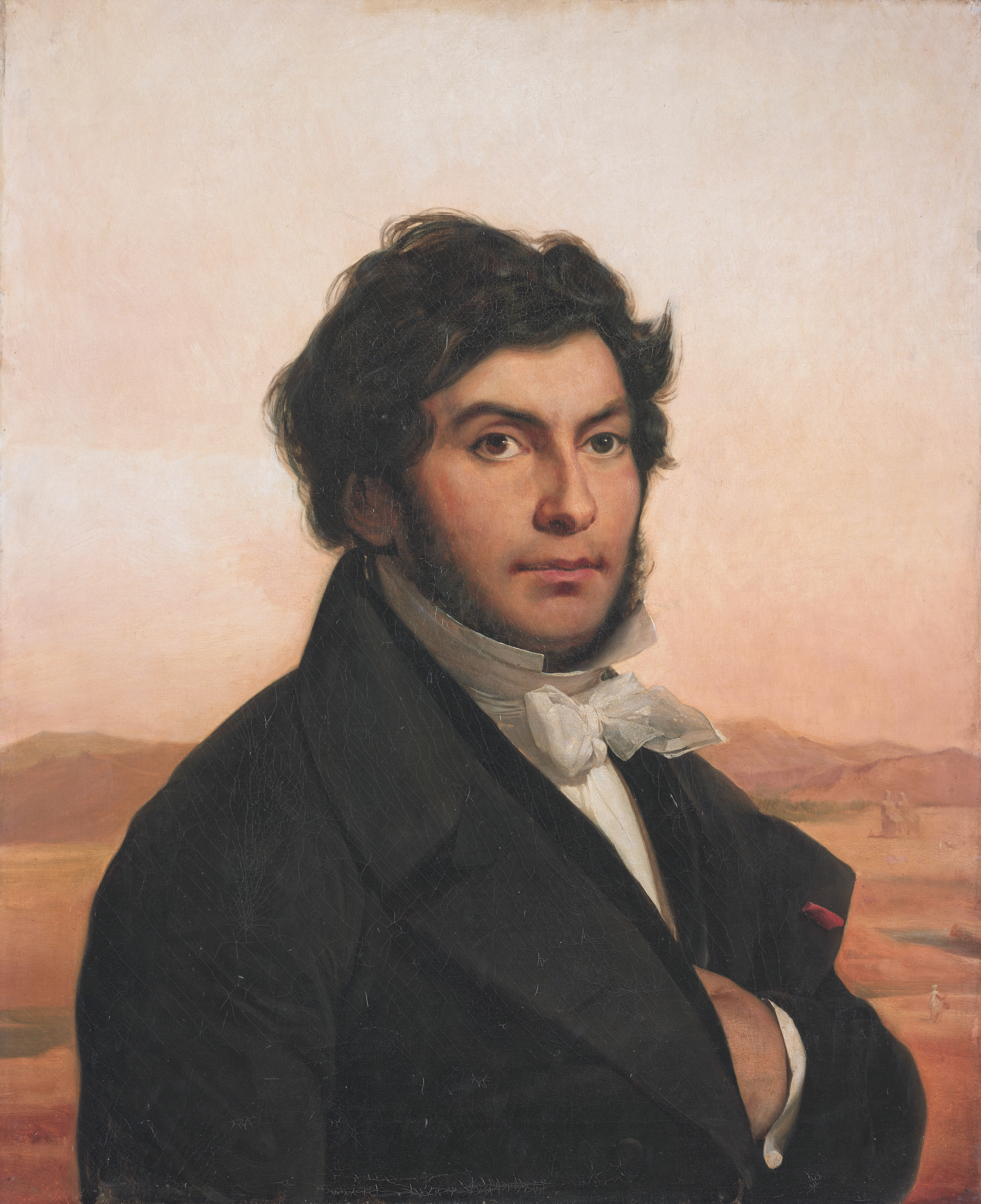
Jean-François Champollion

- Hieroglyphs deciphered by Thomas Young and Jean-François Champollion using the Rosetta Stone.

== Births ==
- 8 February - Maxime Du Camp, writer and photographer (died 1894)
- 4 March - Jules Antoine Lissajous, mathematician (died 1880)
- 8 March - Charles Frédéric Girard, biologist (died 1895)
- 11 March - Joseph Louis François Bertrand, mathematician (died 1900)
- 7 May - André Garin, missionary and parish priest (died 1895)
- 20 May - Frédéric Passy, economist, joint winner (with Henry Dunant) of first Nobel Peace Prize, 1901 (died 1912)
- 26 May - Edmond de Goncourt, writer, critic and book publisher (died 1896)
- 13 September - Maurice Jean Auguste Girard, entomologist (died 1886)
- 19 October - Louis-Nicolas Ménard, man of letters (died 1901)
- 27 December - Louis Pasteur, chemist and microbiologist (died 1895)

=== Full date unknown ===
- Delphine Delamare, housewife and suicide (died 1848)
- Gabriel-Hippolyte Destailleur, architect (died 1893)

== Deaths ==
- 3 March - Abraham-Joseph Bénard, actor (born 1750)
- 19 March - Valentin Haüy, founder of the first school for the blind (born 1745)
- 10 May - Roch-Ambroise Cucurron Sicard, abbé and instructor of deaf-mutes (born 1742)
- 17 May - Duke of Richelieu, former Prime Minister (born 1766)
- 3 June - René Just Haüy, mineralogist (born 1743)
- 2 August - Thomas de Treil de Pardailhan, nobleman and soldier (born 1754)
- 18 August - Armand-Charles Caraffe, historical painter and etcher (born 1762)
- 19 August - Jean Baptiste Joseph Delambre, mathematician and astronomer (born 1749)
- 16 September - Auguste Jean Ameil, Brigade General (born 1776)
- 6 November - Claude Louis Berthollet, chemist and senator (born 1748)
- 10 December - Bertrand Andrieu, medal engraver (born 1761)

=== Full date unknown ===
- Marie-Catherine de Maraise, businesswoman (born 1737)
