= 1825 in France =

- Decades: 1800s; 1810s; 1820s; 1830s; 1840s
- See also: History of France; Timeline of French history; List of years in France

Events from the year 1825 in France.

== Incumbents ==
- Monarch – Charles X
- Prime Minister – Joseph de Villèle

== Events ==
- January - Anti-Sacrilege Act, law against blasphemy and sacrilege passed under King Charles X. The law is never applied (except for a minor point).
- 17 April - Charles X recognizes Haiti, 21 years after it expelled the French after the successful Haitian Revolution.
- 29 May - Coronation of Charles X in Reims. This was the only coronation following the Bourbon Restoration and the last ever to take place.
- 4 November - Canal Saint-Martin opened in Paris.
- Franco-Trarzan War of 1825, conflict between the forces of the new amir of Trarza, Muhammad al Habib, and France.

== Births ==
=== January to June ===
- 28 February - Jean-Baptiste Arban, cornetist and conductor (died 1889)
- 16 March - Auguste Poulet-Malassis, printer and publisher (died 1878)
- 6 May - Charlotte de Rothschild, socialite and painter (died 1899)
- 7 June - Gustave Emile Boissonade, legal scholar (died 1910)
- 14 June - Jean-Baptiste Joseph Émile Montégut, critic (died 1895)
- 30 June - Hervé, composer, librettist and conductor (died 1892)

=== July to December ===
- 2 July - Émile Ollivier, statesman, 30th Prime Minister of France (died 1913)
- 19 July - Pierre Potain, cardiologist (died 1901)
- 4 August - Victor Auguste, baron Duperré, colonial administrator (died 1900)
- 22 August - Auguste Arnaud, sculptor (died 1883)
- 17 October - Louis Joseph Troost, chemist (died 1911)
- 31 October - Charles Lavigerie, Cardinal, Primate of Africa (died 1892)
- 6 November - Charles Garnier, architect (died 1898)
- 29 November - Jean-Martin Charcot, neurologist and professor of anatomical pathology (died 1893)
- 30 November - William-Adolphe Bouguereau, painter (died 1905)
- 25 December - Henri de Bornier, poet and dramatist (died 1901)

=== Full date unknown ===
- Leopold Chasseriau, planter (died 1891)
- Joseph-Epiphane Darras, historian (died 1878)
- Armand Gautier, painter and lithographer (died 1894)

== Deaths ==
=== January to June ===
- 17 January - Antoine-François-Claude Ferrand, statesman and political writer (born 1751)
- 5 February - Pierre Gaveaux, operatic tenor and composer (born 1761)
- 17 February - Jean-Baptiste Robert Lindet, politician (born 1746)
- 25 March - Fabre d'Olivet, author, poet and composer (born 1767)
- 19 May - Claude Henri de Rouvroy, comte de Saint-Simon, utopian socialist thinker (born 1760)
- 21 May - André Briche, General (born 1772)
- 9 June - Pauline Bonaparte, younger and favourite sister of Napoleon I of France (born 1780)

=== July to December ===
- 26 September - Guillaume-André-Réné Baston, theologian (born 1741)
- 28 November - Maximilien Sebastien Foy, military leader, statesman and writer (born 1775)
- 3 December - Adélaïde Dufrénoy, poet and painter (born 1765)
- 5 December - Antoine Alexandre Barbier, librarian and bibliographer (born 1765)
- 29 December - Jacques-Louis David, painter (born 1748)

=== Full date unknown ===
- Guillaume de Bonne-Carrere, diplomat (born 1754)
- Raphaël, Comte de Casabianca, General (born 1738)
