= 1900 in France =

- Decades: 1880s; 1890s; 1900s; 1910s; 1920s
- See also: History of France; Timeline of French history; List of years in France

Events from the year 1900 in France.

== Incumbents ==
- President: Émile Loubet
- President of the Council of Ministers: Pierre Waldeck-Rousseau

== Events ==
- The first Guide Michelin is published for motorists in France.
- 2 February – First performance of Gustave Charpentier's opera, Louise.
- 31 March – The length of a workday for women and children is limited to 11 hours by law.
- 1 April – Every French policeman is assigned to carry a gun.
- 14 April–12 November – Exposition Universelle, a world's fair, is staged in Paris.
- 21 April – Battle of Kousséri: French troops decisively defeat forces of the Kanem–Bornu Empire in Chad (although the commanders on both sides are killed), achieving the objective of linking all French possessions in Western Africa.
- 27 June – Treaty of Paris is signed between the Spanish Empire and the French Empire by which Río Muni is relieved of all conflicting claims.
- 19 July – The first line of the Paris Métro is inaugurated.
- 21 November – Claude Monet's paintings shown at Gallery Durand-Ruel in Paris

== Literature ==
- Colette - Claudine à l'école
- Marcel Proust - Jean Santeuil
- Octave Mirbeau - Le Journal d'une femme de chambre
- Jules Verne
  - Seconde Patrie
  - Le Testament d'un excentrique

== Music ==
- Gustave Charpentier - Louise
- Claude Debussy - Nocturnes
- Gabriel Fauré - Requiem
- Camille Saint-Saëns
  - La Nuit, Op. 114
  - La feu celeste
- Erik Satie - Verset laïque et somptueux

== Sport ==
- 14 May–28 October – Olympic Games held in Paris.

== Births ==
=== January to March ===
- 3 January – Marcel Gobillot, cyclist and Olympic medallist (died 1981)
- 5 January – Yves Tanguy, surrealist painter (died 1955)
- 6 January – Emmanuel d'Astier de la Vigerie, journalist, politician and French Resistance member (died 1969)
- 7 January – Suzanne Dechevaux-Dumesnil, lover and later married to Samuel Beckett (died 1989)
- 8 January – François de Menthon, politician and professor of law (died 1984)
- 11 January – Benoît Fauré, cyclist (died 1980)
- 22 January – René Pellos, artist (died 1998)
- 24 January – René Guillot, author (died 1969)
- 4 February – Jacques Prévert, poet and screenwriter (died 1977)
- 11 February – Raymond Cambefort, one of the last three fully verified World War I veterans living in France (died 2008)
- 21 February – Madeleine Renaud, actress (died 1994)
- 6 March – Henri Jeanson, writer and journalist (died 1970)
- 8 March – Pierre David-Weill, investment banker (died 1975)
- 19 March – Frédéric Joliot-Curie, physicist and Nobel laureate (died 1958)

=== April to June ===
- 13 April – Pierre Molinier, painter and photographer (died 1976)
- 15 April – Pierre Nord, writer, spy and resistance member (died 1985)
- 20 April – Jacques Adnet, designer, architect and interior designer (died 1984)
- 27 April – Marcel Légaut, philosopher and mathematician (died 1990)
- 28 April
  - Maurice Thorez, communist politician (died 1964)
  - Jean Vaysse, rugby union player (died 1974)
- 17 May – Achille Souchard, cyclist (died 1976)
- 22 May – Yvonne de Gaulle, married to Charles de Gaulle (died 1979)
- 14 June – Roger Bourdin, baritone (died 1973)
- 22 June – Henriette Alimen, paleontologist and geologist (died 1996)
- 29 June – Antoine de Saint-Exupéry, pilot and writer (died 1944)

=== July to December ===
- 4 July – Robert Desnos, surrealist poet (died 1945)
- 12 July – Marcel Paul, trade unionist and communist politician (died 1982)
- 17 July – Marcel Dalio, actor (died 1983)
- 19 July – Pierre Coquelin de Lisle, sport shooter and Olympic gold medallist (died 1980)
- 26 July – Jacques Février, pianist (died 1979)
- 11 August – Georges Limbour, writer (died 1970)
- 26 August – Georges Neveux, Ukrainian-born dramatist and poet (died 1982)
- 6 September – Marc Bernard, writer (died 1983).
- 30 September – Pierre Yvert, philatelic editor (died 1964)
- 9 October – Henri Lauvaux, athlete and Olympic medallist (died 1970)
- 13 October – Ghislaine Marie Françoise Dommanget, actress and Princess of Monaco (died 1991)
- 21 October – Andrée Boisson, Olympic fencer (died 1973)
- November – Émile Gagnan, engineer and inventor (died 1979)
- 15 December – Hellé Nice, model, dancer and motor racing driver (died 1984)
- 23 December – Marie Bell, actress and stage director (died 1985)

== Deaths ==
- 11 February – Émile Blanchard, zoologist and entomologist (born 1819)
- 19 March – Charles-Louis Hanon, piano pedagogue and composer (born 1819)
- 26 March – Victor Auguste, baron Duperré, colonial administrator (born 1825)
- 5 April – Joseph Louis François Bertrand, mathematician (born 1822)
- 15 April - Gaston Louis Alfred Leroux, writer (born 1868)
- 22 April – Amédée-François Lamy, military officer (born 1858)
- 18 May – Félix Ravaisson-Mollien, philosopher and archaeologist (born 1813)
- 16 June – François d'Orléans, prince de Joinville, admiral (born 1818)
- 24 September – Louis Ratisbonne, writer and man of letters (born 1827)
- 13 October – Louis Adolphe Cochery, politician and journalist (born 1819)
- Full date unknown – Jules Adenis, dramatist and opera librettist (born 1823)

== See also ==
- List of French films before 1910
