= 1807 in France =

- Decades: 1780s; 1790s; 1800s; 1810s; 1820s
- See also: History of France; Timeline of French history; List of years in France

Events from the year 1807 in France.

== Incumbents ==
- Emperor – Napoleon I

== Events ==
- 7 January – The United Kingdom issues an Order in Council prohibiting British ships from trading with France or its allies.
- 7–8 February – Battle of Eylau, indecisive result, but Russian retreat.
- 19 March – Siege of Danzig begins as French lay siege to Prussian and Russian forces.
- 4 May – Treaty of Finckenstein signed between France and Qajar dynasty Persia, guaranteeing the latter's integrity.
- 24 May – Siege of Danzig ends with Prussian and Russian capitulation.
- 10 June – Battle of Heilsberg, inconclusive.
- 14 June – Battle of Friedland: decisive French victory over Russian forces.
- 7–9 July – Treaties of Tilsit end the war with Russia and Prussia.
- 20 July – Nicéphore Niépce is awarded a patent by Napoleon for the Pyréolophore, the world's first internal combustion engine, after it successfully powers a boat upstream on the river Saône.
- 27 October – Treaty of Fontainebleau signed between Spain and France, dividing Portugal and all its dominions between the signatories.
- 9 September – Napoleon establishes the Free City of Danzig.
- 27 September – Napoleon purchases the Borghese art collection, including the Antinous Mondragone, and brings it to Paris.
- 24 November – Battle of Abrantes, Portugal: The French under Jean-Andoche Junot take the town.
- 17 December – Milan Decree issued by Napoleon, stating that no European country is to trade with the United Kingdom (the 'Continental System').

== Births ==
=== January to June ===
- 6 January – Auguste Nicolas, Roman Catholic apologetical writer (died 1888)
- 29 January – Édouard Dulaurier, orientalist and Egyptologist (died 1881)
- 2 February – Alexandre Auguste Ledru-Rollin, politician (died 1874)
- 5 February – Ernest Legouvé, dramatist (died 1903)
- 26 February – Théophile-Jules Pelouze, chemist (died 1867)
- 4 March – Jean Baptiste Lucien Buquet, entomologist (died 1889)
- 12 April – Charles Rigault de Genouilly, Admiral (died 1873)
- 20 April – Célimène Gaudieux, musician and innkeeper (died 1864)
- 26 April – Charles Auguste Frossard, general (died 1875)
- 17 May – Jules Guyot, physician and agronomist (died 1872)
- 17 June – Auguste Nélaton, physician and surgeon (died 1873)

=== July to December ===
- 24 August
  - Jean-Jacques Feuchère, sculptor (died 1852)
  - Jules Verreaux, botanist and ornithologist (died 1873)
- 3 September – Raymond Gayrard, sculptor (died 1855)
- 21 October – Napoléon Henri Reber, composer (died 1880)
- 14 November – Auguste Laurent, chemist (died 1853)
- 20 November – Augustus Thébaud, Jesuit educator and publicist (died 1885)
- 29 November – Jean Philippe Goujon de Grondel, General (born 1714)

=== Full date unknown ===
- Auguste-Barthélemy Glaize, painter (died 1893)
- Alphonse Sagebien, hydrological engineer (died 1892)

== Deaths ==
=== January to June ===
- 13 January – Pierre Joseph Buchoz, physician, lawyer and naturalist (born 1731)
- 17 January – Pierre Marie Auguste Broussonet, naturalist (born 1761)
- 14 February – Jean-Joseph Ange d'Hautpoul, General (born 1754)
- 25 February – Jeanne-Marie Marsan, singer and actress (born 1746)
- 4 April – Jérôme Lalande, astronomer and writer (born 1732)
- 5 May – Napoleon Charles Bonaparte, eldest son of Louis Bonaparte (born 1802)
- 10 May – Jean-Baptiste Donatien de Vimeur, comte de Rochambeau, aristocrat and Marshal of France (born 1725)
- 18 May – Antoine Philippe, Duke of Montpensier, younger brother of Louis-Philippe of France (born 1775)

=== July to December ===
- 5 August – Jeanne Baret, first woman to circumnavigate the globe (born 1740)
- 19 August – Louis Binot, General (born 1771)
- 25 August
  - Sophie Ristaud Cottin, writer (born 1770)
  - Jean-Étienne-Marie Portalis, jurist and politician (born 1746)
- 31 August – Ponce Denis Écouchard Lebrun, poet (born 1729)
- October – Louis Pierre de Chastenet de Puységur, soldier and Minister of War (born 1727)
- 2 November – Baron de Breteuil, aristocrat, diplomat and Prime Minister (born 1730)
- 8 November – Pierre-Alexandre-Laurent Forfait, engineer, hydrographer and Minister of the Navy (born 1752)
- 23 November – Jean-François Rewbell, lawyer, diplomat and politician (born 1747)
