= 1877 in France =

- Decades: 1850s; 1860s; 1870s; 1880s; 1890s
- See also: History of France; Timeline of French history; List of years in France

Events from the year 1877 in France.

== Incumbents ==
- President: Patrice de MacMahon, Duke of Magenta
- President of the Council of Ministers:
  - until 17 May: Jules Simon
  - 17 May-23 November: Albert, 4th duc de Broglie
  - 23 November-13 December: Gaëtan de Rochebouët
  - starting 13 December: Jules Armand Dufaure

== Events ==
- 16 May – Constitutional crisis which ultimately seals the defeat of the royalist movement.
- 14 October – Legislative election held.
- 28 October – Legislative election held.
- 'Yablochkov candles' (a form of arc lamp) are first used commercially in the 'Marengo hall' of the department store Galeries du Louvre in Paris.

== Literature ==
- Augustine Tuillerie - Le Tour de la France par deux enfants
- Jules Verne
  - Les Indes noires
  - Hector Servadac
- Émile Zola - L'Assommoir

== Births ==
=== January to March ===
- 29 January – Georges Catroux, military officer and diplomat (died 1969)
- 17 February – André Maginot, politician, advocate of the Maginot Line (died 1932)
- 19 February – Louis Aubert, composer (died 1968)
- 21 February – Reginald Garrigou-Lagrange, Catholic theologian (died 1964)
- 28 February – André Simon, wine merchant, gourmet and writer (died 1970)
- 21 March – Maurice Farman, motor racing driver, aviator, aircraft manufacturer and designer (died 1964)
- 29 March – Jules Boucherit, violinist and teacher (died 1962)

=== April to June ===
- 15 April – Jules Basdevant, law professor (died 1968)
- 26 May – Jean Schlumberger, writer and journalist (died 1968)
- 31 May – Gabrielle Renaudot Flammarion, née Renaudot, astronomer (died 1962)
- 14 June – Jane Bathori, opera singer (died 1970)

=== July to December ===
- 4 July – Jacques Bacot, explorer and Tibetologist (died 1965)
- 5 July – Georges Saillard, actor (died 1967)
- 6 July – Arnaud Massy, golfer (died 1950)
- 8 July – René Navarre, actor (died 1968)
- 19 July – Cécile Brunschvicg, politician (died 1946)
- 18 November – Jules Isaac, historian (died 1963)
- 13 December – Edmond Locard, pioneer in forensic science (died 1966)

== Deaths ==
- 31 March – Antoine Augustin Cournot, economist, philosopher and mathematician (born 1801)
- 9 April – Pierre Louis Alphée Cazenave, dermatologist (born 1795)
- 26 April – Louise Bertin, composer (born 1805)
- 28 June – Jacques-Maurice De Saint Palais, Archbishop of Indianapolis (born 1811)
- 3 September – Adolphe Thiers, politician, historian and Prime Minister of France (born 1797)
- 23 September – Urbain Le Verrier, mathematician (born 1811)
- 16 October – Théodore Barrière, dramatist (born 1823)
- 26 December
  - Aristide Boucicaut, creator of Le Bon Marché department stores (born 1810)
  - Jean-Jacques Meyer, steam locomotive engineer (born 1805)
- 31 December – Gustave Courbet, painter (born 1819)
