= 1882 in France =

- Decades: 1860s; 1870s; 1880s; 1890s; 1900s
- See also: History of France; Timeline of French history; List of years in France

Events from the year 1882 in France.

== Incumbents ==
- President: Jules Grévy
- President of the Council of Ministers:
  - until 30 January: Léon Gambetta
  - 30 January-7 August: Charles de Freycinet
  - starting 7 August: Charles Duclerc

== Literature ==
- Jules Barbey d'Aurevilly - Une histoire sans nom
- Ludovic Halévy - L'abbé Constantin
- Joris-Karl Huysmans - À vau-l'eau
- Georges Ohnet - Le Maître de forges
- Jules Verne - L'École des Robinsons / Le Rayon vert

== Events ==
- 28 March – Republican Jules Ferry makes primary education in France free, non-clerical (laique) and obligatory.
- 6 May – North Sea Fisheries Convention is signed by United Kingdom, Germany, Denmark, Netherlands, Belgium and France to regulate the policy of the fisheries in the North Sea.

== Births ==
=== January to March ===
- 13 January – Darius Paul Dassault, General (died 1969)
- 18 January – Lazare Lévy, pianist, composer and teacher (died 1964)
- 19 January – Pierre Allemane, international soccer player (died 1956)
- 5 February – Louis Wagner, motor racing driver (died 1960)
- 21 February – Jean Dupas, painter, designer, poster artist and decorator (died 1964)
- 26 February – Pierre Mac Orlan, novelist and songwriter (died 1970)
- 20 March – René Coty, politician, President of France (died 1962)

=== April to June ===
- 16 April – André Edouard Marty, artist (died 1974)
- 17 April – Émile Muselier, Admiral (died 1965)
- 10 May – Donatien Bouché, sailor and Olympic gold medallist (died 1965)
- 13 May – Georges Braque, painter and sculptor (died 1963)
- 25 May – Maurice Le Boucher, organist, composer, and pedagogue (died 1964)
- 13 June – Claude-Léon Mascaux, sculptor (died 1965)
- 22 June – Jacques Thubé, sailor and Olympic gold medallist (died 1969)
- 28 June – Jean-Julien Lemordant, artist and soldier (died 1968)

=== July to September ===
- 2 July – Princess Marie Bonaparte, psychoanalyst (died 1962)
- 8 August – François Piétri, politician, Minister and diplomat (died 1966)
- 10 August – Paul Marchandeau, politician and Minister (died 1968)
- 16 August – Désiré Mérchez, swimmer, water polo player and Olympic medallist (died 1968)
- 10 September – Jacques Gréber, architect (died 1962)
- 24 September – Max Décugis, tennis player (died 1978)

=== October to December ===
- 12 October – Émile Girardeau, engineer (died 1970).
- 18 October – Lucien Petit-Breton, cyclist, winner of 1907 and 1908 Tour de France (died 1917)
- 25 October – André-Damien-Ferdinand Jullien, Cardinal (died 1964)
- 29 October – Jean Giraudoux, novelist, essayist, diplomat and playwright (died 1944)
- 18 November – Jacques Maritain, Catholic philosopher (died 1973)
- 22 November – Charles Vildrac, playwright and poet (died 1971)
- 29 November – Henri Fabre, aviator and aircraft designer (died 1984)
- 7 December – Robert Debré, pediatrician (died 1978)
- 31 December – Eugène Le Moult, naturalist and entomologist (died 1967)

=== Full date unknown ===
- Louis Gernet, philologist and sociologist (died 1962)
- Robert Louzon, engineer, revolutionary syndicalist, anarchist and socialist (died 1976)
- Julien Peridier, electrical engineer and astronomer (died 1967)

== Deaths ==
=== January to June ===
- 1 February – Antoine Bussy, chemist (born 1794)
- 12 February – Madame Céleste, actress (born 1815)
- 20 February – Louis Adolphe le Doulcet, comte de Pontécoulant, soldier and musicologist (born 1794)
- 8 April – Jules Etienne Joseph Quicherat, historian and archaeologist (born 1814)
- 1 May – Célestine Guynemer de la Hailandière, Roman Catholic Archbishop of Indianapolis (born 1798)
- 17 May – François Chabas, egyptologist (born 1817)
- 15 June – Ernest Courtot de Cissey, General (born 1810)
- 20 June – François-Auguste Biard, painter (born 1800)
- 25 June – François Jouffroy, sculptor (born 1806)

=== July to December ===
- 6 August – Antoine-Élisabeth-Cléophas Dareste de la Chavanne, historian (born 1820)
- 16 August – Auguste-Alexandre Ducrot, general (born 1817)
- 22 August – Louis-Auguste Desmarres, ophthalmologist (born 1810)
- 8 September – Joseph Liouville, mathematician (born 1809)
- 14 September – Georges Leclanché, electrical engineer (born 1839)
- 6 December – Louis Blanc, politician and historian (born 1811)
- 26 December – Henri Le Secq, painter and photographer (born 1818)
- 31 December – Léon Gambetta, statesman (born 1838)
