= 1893 in France =

- Decades: 1870s; 1880s; 1890s; 1900s; 1910s
- See also: History of France; Timeline of French history; List of years in France

Events from the year 1893 in France.

== Incumbents ==
- President: Marie François Sadi Carnot
- President of the Council of Ministers:
  - until 4 April: Alexandre Ribot
  - 4 April-3 December: Charles Dupuy
  - starting 3 December: Jean Casimir-Perier

== Events ==
- 10 March – Côte d'Ivoire becomes a French colony.
- 16–17 August – Massacre of Italians at Aigues-Mortes: Italian workers of the Compagnie des Salins du Midi are attacked in Aigues-Mortes (France) by French villagers and workers with at least 8 deaths. Anti-French riots erupt in Italy. In Rome the windows of the French Embassy are smashed and for a while the angry mob seems to get out of hand.
- 20 August – Legislative election held.
- 3 September – Legislative election held.
- 10 October – First vehicle registration plates in the Seine (department), under terms of a Paris Police Ordinance of 14 August.

== Literature ==
- Anatole France - La Rôtisserie de la reine Pédauque
- Hector Malot - En famille
- Octave Mirbeau - Dans le ciel
- Jules Verne - Claudius Bombarnac / P'tit-Bonhomme
- Émile Zola - Le Docteur Pascal

== Births ==
=== January to June ===
- 3 February – Gaston Julia, mathematician (died 1978).
- 5 February – Arsène Roux, Arabist and Berberologist (died 1971).
- 15 March – Jules Moch, politician (died 1985).
- 21 March – Marcel Rey-Golliet, boxer (died 1967).
- 3 April – Bernard Faÿ, historian (died 1978).
- 17 April – Marguerite Broquedis, tennis player (died 1983).
- 12 May – René Mourlon, athlete and Olympic medallist (died 1977).
- 14 May – Louis Verneuil, playwright and screenwriter (died 1952).

=== July to December ===
- 28 July – Alfred Eluère, rugby union player (died 1985).
- 15 August – Eugène Criqui, world champion boxer (died 1977).
- 15 August – Pierre Dac, humorist and French Resistance activist (died 1975).
- 17 August – Jean Laigret, biologist (died 1966).
- 19 October – Henri Mignet, aircraft designer and builder (died 1965).
- 1 November – Pierre Deley, pioneering pilot (died 1981).
- 5 November – Raymond Loewy, industrial designer (died 1986).
- 3 December – Edmond Decottignies, weightlifter and Olympic gold medallist (died 1963).
- 8 December – Pierre Etchebaster, real tennis player (died 1980).
- 31 December – Robert Jacquinot, cyclist (died 1980).

== Deaths ==
- 10 January – Alexis André, missionary priest in Canada (born 1832).
- 27 March – Alphonse Beau de Rochas, engineer (born 1815).
- 4 April – Alphonse Pyrame de Candolle, botanist (born 1806).
- 8 April – Félix Esquirou de Parieu, statesman (born 1815).
- 12 April – Alfred-Henri-Amand Mame, printer and publisher (born 1811).
- 14 April – Jacques Marie François Bigot, naturalist and entomologist (born 1818).
- 28 April – Gustave Nadaud, songwriter and chansonnier (born 1820).
- 16 August – Jean-Martin Charcot, neurologist and professor of anatomical pathology (born 1825).
- 17 October – Patrice de Mac-Mahon, duc de Magenta, general and politician, first President of the Third Republic (born 1808).
- 18 October – Charles Gounod, composer (born 1818).
- 4 November – Pierre Tirard, politician (born 1827).
- 8 November – Arnaud-Michel d'Abbadie, geographer (born 1815).
- 17 November – Hippolyte Destailleur, architect (born 1822).

=== Full date unknown ===
- Augustine Brohan, actress (born 1824).
- Nicolas Édouard Delabarre-Duparcq, military critic and historian (born 1819).
- Auguste-Barthélemy Glaize, painter (born 1807).
