= 1892 in France =

- Decades: 1870s; 1880s; 1890s; 1900s; 1910s
- See also: History of France; Timeline of French history; List of years in France

Events from the year 1892 in France.

== Incumbents ==
- President: Marie François Sadi Carnot
- President of the Council of Ministers:
  - until 27 February: Charles de Freycinet
  - 27 February-6 December: Émile Loubet
  - starting 6 December: Alexandre Ribot

== Events ==
- 12 July – A hidden lake bursts out of a glacier on the side of Mont Blanc, flooding the valley below and killing around 200 villagers and holidaymakers in Saint-Gervais-les-Bains.
- 8 November – Anarchist bomb kills six in police station in Avenue de l'Opera, Paris.
- 17 November – French troops occupy Abomey, capital of kingdom of Dahomey.
- Panama scandals: The Panama Canal Company bankruptcy is found to have involved over 800,000 French people (including 15,000 single women) losing their investments in stocks, bonds and founder shares of the company, to the sum of approximately 1.8 billion gold Francs.

== Literature ==
- Jules Verne - Le Château des Carpathes
- Émile Zola - La Débâcle

== Sport ==
- 20 March – The first ever French rugby championship final takes place in Paris. Pierre de Coubertin referees the match, which Racing Club de France wins, 4–3, over Stade Français.

== Births ==
=== January to March ===
- 22 January – Marcel Dassault, aircraft industrialist (died 1986)
- 24 February – Maurice Monney-Bouton, rower and Olympic medallist (died 1965)
- 10 March – Arthur Honegger, composer (died 1955)
- 22 March – Géo-Charles, poet (died 1963)

=== April to June ===
- 15 April – Joseph-Charles Lefèbvre, Cardinal (died 1973)
- 18 April – Eugene Houdry, mechanical engineer (died 1962)
- 19 April – Germaine Tailleferre, composer (died 1983)
- 26 April – Adrienne Monnier, poet and publisher (died 1955)
- 29 April – Henri Bard, international soccer player (died 1951)
- 8 May – André Obey, playwright (died 1975)
- 10 June – Armand Lunel, writer (died 1977)
- 18 June – Victor Fontan, cyclist (died 1982)

=== July to September ===
- 1 July – Jean Lurçat, painter and tapestry designer (died 1966)
- 19 July – Suzanne Malherbe, illustrator and designer (died 1972)
- 24 July – Marcel Gromaire, painter (died 1971)
- 26 July – Philipp Jarnach, composer (died 1982)
- 28 July – Philippe Cattiau, fencer and Olympic gold medallist (died 1964)
- 15 August – Louis de Broglie, physicist and a Nobel laureate (died 1987)
- 21 August – Charles Vanel, film director and actor (died 1989)
- 4 September – Darius Milhaud, composer (died 1974)
- 15 September – Louis Favre, French painter (died 1956)
- 26 September – Émile Dewoitine, aviation engineer and industrialist (died 1979)

=== October to December ===
- 26 October – André Chapelon, mechanical engineer and designer of steam locomotives (died 1978)
- 11 November – Gaston Heuet, athlete and Olympic medallist (died 1979)
- 14 November – Dieudonne Costes, aviator (died 1973)
- 20 November – Charlotte de La Trémoille, noblewoman (died 1971)
- 23 November – Romain de Tirtoff, artist and designer (died 1990)
- 9 December – André Randall, actor (died 1974)

=== Full date unknown ===
- Maurice d'Hartoy, soldier, politician and writer (died 1981)
- Robert Lingat, academic scholar (died 1972)

== Deaths ==
- 22 April – Édouard Lalo, composer (born 1823)
- 1 June – Louis Janmot, painter and poet (born 1814)
- 22 June – Pierre Ossian Bonnet, mathematician (born 1819)
- 29 July – Pierre Edmond Teisserenc de Bort, writer and politician (born 1814)
- 30 September – Hector-Jonathan Crémieux, librettist and playwright (born 1828)
- 6 October – Jean Antoine Villemin, physician (born 1827)
- 12 October – Ernest Renan, philosopher and writer (born 1823)
- 4 November – Hervé, composer, librettist and conductor (born 1825)
- 15 November – Pierre Louis Charles de Failly, general (born 1810)
- 26 November – Charles Lavigerie, Cardinal, Primate of Africa (born 1825)

=== Full date unknown ===
- Alphonse Sagebien, hydrological engineer (born 1807)

== See also ==
- List of French films before 1910
