= 1881 in France =

- Decades: 1860s; 1870s; 1880s; 1890s; 1900s
- See also: History of France; Timeline of French history; List of years in France

Events from the year 1881 in France.

== Incumbents ==
- President: Jules Grévy
- President of the Council of Ministers: Jules Ferry (until 14 November), Charles de Freycinet (starting 14 November)

== Events ==
- 13 February – First issue of the feminist newspaper La Citoyenne is published by Hubertine Auclert.
- 23 March – A fire caused by a gas explosion destroys the Opéra de Nice with fatalities.
- April – Sixth Impressionist exhibition in Paris, at Nadar's studio.
- 12 May – Treaty of Bardo is signed between the French Republic and Tunisian bey Muhammed as-Sadiq. Tunisia becomes a French protectorate.
- 29 July – Law on the Freedom of the Press is passed.
- 15 August–15 November – International Exposition of Electricity staged in Paris. Among new developments demonstrated is Clément Ader's stereophonic théâtrophone.
- 13 October – Determined to bring about the revival of the Hebrew language as a way of unifying Jews, Eliezer Ben-Yehuda has what is believed to be the first conversation in Modern Hebrew, with friends living in Paris.

== Literature ==
- Gustave Flaubert - Bouvard et Pécuchet
- Anatole France - Le Crime de Sylvestre Bonnard
- Joris-Karl Huysmans - En ménage
- Jules Verne - La Jangada

== Births ==
- 11 January – Lucien Rosengart, engineer (died 1976)
- 21 January – André Godard, archeologist and architect (died 1965)
- 19 February – Paul Tournon, architect (died 1964)
- 20 February – Julien Maitron, cyclist (died 1972)
- 21 February – Marc Boegner, theologist, pastor, French Resistance member and essayist (died 1970)
- 18 March – Paul Le Flem, composer and musician (died 1984)
- 23 March – Roger Martin du Gard, author, winner of the 1937 Nobel Prize for Literature (died 1958)
- 12 April – Élisée Maclet, painter (died 1962)
- 1 May - Pierre Teilhard de Chardin, paleontologist, Jesuit priest (died 1955)
- 21 June – Camille Drevet, anti-colonialist, feminist and pacifist activist (died 1969)
- 27 June – Jérôme Carcopino, historian and author (died 1970)
- 29 July – Paul Couturier, priest and promoter of the concept of Christian unity (died 1953)
- 7 August – François Darlan, Admiral (died 1942)
- 10 October – Gaston Ragueneau, athlete and Olympic medallist (died 1978)
- 4 November – Gaby Deslys, dancer and actress (died 1920)
- 8 November – Robert Esnault-Pelterie, pioneering aircraft designer (died 1957)
- 5 December – René Cresté, actor and director (died 1922)
- 12 December - Louise Thuliez, resistance fighter in World War I and World War II (died 1966)

== Deaths ==
- 19 January – Auguste Mariette, scholar and archaeologist (born 1821)
- 13 February – Alexis Paulin Paris, scholar and author (born 1800)
- 17 February – Emile-Justin Menier, pharmaceutical manufacturer, chocolatier, and politician (born 1826).
- 1 March – Édouard Drouyn de Lhuys, statesman and diplomat (born 1805)
- 24 March – Achille Ernest Oscar Joseph Delesse, geologist and mineralogist (born 1817)
- 26 March – Jules Achille Noël, painter (born 1815)
- 4 April – Napoléon Peyrat, author and historian (born 1809)
- 27 April – Émile de Girardin, journalist, publicist and politician (born 1802)
- 2 June
  - Émile Littré, lexicographer and philosopher (born 1801)
  - Pierre Louis Rouillard, sculptor (born 1820)
- 28 June – Jules Armand Dufaure, statesman (born 1798)
- 9 July – Paul Bins, comte de Saint-Victor, author (born 1827)
- 21 December – Édouard Dulaurier, Orientalist and Egyptologist (born 1807)
