= Tendil =

Tendil may refer to:

- Tendil (cycling team), a cycling team that took part of the Milano–Torino cycling race
- Alexis Tendil (1896–2005), one of the last surviving French veterans of the First World War

== See also ==
- Tendilla, a municipality in Guadalajara, Castile-La Mancha, Spain
