= 1876 in France =

- Decades: 1850s; 1860s; 1870s; 1880s; 1890s
- See also: History of France; Timeline of French history; List of years in France

Events from the year 1876 in France.

== Incumbents ==
- President: Patrice de MacMahon, Duke of Magenta
- President of the Council of Ministers:
  - until 23 February: Louis Buffet
  - 23 February-12 December: Jules Armand Dufaure
  - starting 12 December: Jules Simon

== Events ==
- 20 February – Legislative Election held.
- 5 March – Legislative Election was held.
- 10 October – French Workers Congress was held.

== Literature ==
- Alphonse Daudet - Jack
- Joris-Karl Huysmans - Marthe
- Jules Verne - Michael Strogoff
- Émile Zola - Son Excellence Eugène Rougon

== Music ==
- Léo Delibes - Sylvia
- Jacques Offenbach - Pierrette et Jacquot

== Births ==
- 3 March – Georges Guillain, neurologist (died 1961)
- 4 March – Léon-Paul Fargue, poet and essayist (died 1947)
- 5 March – Édouard Belin, photographic inventor (died 1963)
- 4 April – Maurice de Vlaminck, painter, printmaker and author (died 1958)
- 22 April – Pierre Albert-Birot, author (died 1967)
- 29 April – Paul Antoine Aristide Montel, mathematician (died 1975)
- 27 May – René Guyon, jurist (died 1963)
- 22 June – Madeleine Vionnet, fashion designer (died 1975)
- 24 June – Henri Marchal, archaeologist (died 1970)
- 12 July – Max Jacob, poet, painter, writer, and critic (died 1944)
- 16 October – Gaston Thubé, sailor and Olympic gold medallist (died 1974)
- 19 November – Louis de Fleurac, athlete and Olympic medallist (died 1965)

== Deaths ==
=== January to June ===
- 26 January – Frédérick Lemaître, actor and playwright (born 1800)
- 13 February – Gabriel Andral, pathologist (born 1797)
- 18 February – Adolphe-Théodore Brongniart, botanist (born 1801)
- 5 March – Marie d'Agoult, author, pen name Daniel Stern (born 1805)
- 9 March – Louise Colet, poet (born 1810)
- 24 May – Alphonse de Cailleux, painter and arts administrator (born 1788)
- 30 April – Antoine Jérôme Balard, chemist and discoverer of bromine (born 1802)
- 30 April – Jean-Rémy Bessieux, founder of Roman Catholic mission in Gabon and first Bishop there (born 1803)
- 12 May – Louis-Auguste Bisson, photographer (born 1814)
- 6 June – Auguste Casimir-Perier, diplomat (born 1811)

=== July to December ===
- 27 August – Eugène Fromentin, painter and writer (born 1820)
- 29 August – Félicien-César David, composer (born 1810)
- August – Etienne-Paulin Gagne, poet, essayist, lawyer, politician, inventor, and eccentric (born 1808)
- 10 October – Charles Joseph Sainte-Claire Deville, geologist and meteorologist (born 1814)
- 10 October – Hyacinthe de Valroger, Roman Catholic priest and Oratorian (born 1814)
