= 1824 in France =

- Decades: 1800s; 1810s; 1820s; 1830s; 1840s
- See also: History of France; Timeline of French history; List of years in France

Events from the year 1824 in France.

== Incumbents ==
- Monarch – Louis XVIII (until 16 September), then Charles X
- Prime Minister – Joseph de Villèle

== Events ==
- 25 February - Legislative election held.
- 6 March - Legislative election held.
- 16 September - Charles X succeeds Louis XVIII as King of France.
- Cimetière du Montparnasse is established.

== Arts and literature ==
- The first collection of poetry by Victor Hugo, Nouvelles Odes et Poésies Diverses, is published.

== Births ==
- 11 January - Théophile Nicolas Noblot, politician (died 1891)
- 15 January - Marie Duplessis, courtesan (died 1847)
- 11 May - Jean-Léon Gérôme, painter and sculptor (died 1904)
- 28 June - Paul Broca, physician, anatomist, and anthropologist (died 1880)
- 12 July - Eugène Boudin, painter (died 1898)
- 27 July - Alexandre Dumas, fils, writer, author and playwright (died 1895)
- 6 December - Emmanuel Frémiet, sculptor (died 1910)
- 14 December - Pierre Puvis de Chavannes, painter (died 1898)
- 25 December - Rodolphe-Madeleine Cleophas Dareste de la Chavanne, jurist (died 1911)

=== Full date unknown ===
- Joséphine-Félicité-Augustine Brohan, actress (died 1893)

== Deaths ==
- 26 January - Théodore Géricault, painter and lithographer (born 1791)
- 27 January - Jean-Benoît-Vincent Barré, architect (b. c1732)
- 21 February - Eugène de Beauharnais, soldier and stepson of Napoleon (born 1781)
- 16 June - Charles-François Lebrun, duc de Plaisance, statesman (born 1739)
- 21 June - Étienne Aignan, translator, political writer, librettist and playwright (born 1773)
- 20 July - Maine de Biran, philosopher (born 1766)
- 16 September - Louis XVIII, King of France and Navarre (born 1755)
- 20 October - Jean-Louis-Paul-François, 5th duc de Noailles, scientist (born 1739)
- 24 October - André Thouin, botanist (born 1746)
- 9 December - Anne-Louis Girodet de Roussy-Trioson, painter (born 1767)
