= 1878 in France =

- Decades: 1850s; 1860s; 1870s; 1880s; 1890s
- See also: History of France; Timeline of French history; List of years in France

Events from the year 1878 in France.

== Incumbents ==
- President: Patrice de MacMahon, Duke of Magenta
- President of the Council of Ministers: Jules Armand Dufaure

== Events ==
- 1 May–10 November – Exposition Universelle, a world's fair, is staged in Paris. In June some parts of the city are first lit by 'Yablochkov candles' (arc lamps), and on 30 June the head of the Statue of Liberty goes on display.
- May – Chemins de fer de l'État formed to take over ten small railway companies operating between the Loire and Garonne.
- 18 December – French passenger steamer Byzantin founders in the Dardanelles during a gale after collision with British SS Rinaldo, killing around 210 people, with only 14 crew of the Byzantin saved.

== Literature ==
- Hector Malot - Sans Famille
- Jules Verne - Un capitaine de quinze ans
- Émile Zola - Une page d'amour

== Music ==
- Jules Massenet - Le roi de Lahore
- Jacques Offenbach - Maître Péronilla / Madame Favart

== Births ==
=== January to June ===
- 28 January - Jean de La Hire, Author (died 1956)
- 5 February – Jean Becquerel, physicist (died 1953)
- 5 February – André Citroën, automobile pioneer (died 1935)
- 21 February – Mirra Alfassa, spiritual leader (died 1973)
- 28 February – Pierre Fatou, mathematician (died 1929)
- 24 March – René Baudichon, sculptor and medallist (died 1963)
- 2 April – Émilie Charmy, artist (died 1974)
- 17 April – Albert Canet, tennis player
- 3 May – Jean Chiappe, civil servant (died 1940)
- 26 May – Charles Burguet, film director (died 1946)
- 28 May – Paul Pelliot, sinologist and explorer (died 1945)
- 8 June – Yvonne Prévost, tennis player (died 1942)

=== July to December ===
- 22 July – Lucien Febvre, social historian (died 1956)
- 16 August – Léon Binoche, rugby union player (died 1962)
- 2 September – Maurice René Fréchet, mathematician (died 1973)
- 15 October – Paul Reynaud, politician and lawyer (died 1966)
- 17 October – Henri Mulet, organist and composer (died 1967)
- 14 November – Julie Manet, painter and art collector (died 1966)
- 23 November – André Caplet, composer and conductor (died 1925)

=== Full date unknown ===
- Georges Garnier, soccer player (died 1936)

== Deaths ==
- 7 January – François-Vincent Raspail, chemist, physiologist and socialist (born 1794)
- 8 January – Charles Cousin-Montauban, Comte de Palikao, general and statesman (born 1796)
- 18 January – Antoine César Becquerel, scientist (born 1788)
- 19 January – Henri Victor Regnault, chemist and physicist (born 1810)
- 11 February – Auguste Poulet-Malassis, printer and publisher (born 1825)
- 19 February – Charles-François Daubigny, painter (born 1817)
- 2 April – Louis Léonard de Loménie, author (born 1815)
- 8 April – Eugène Belgrand, engineer (born 1810)
- 6 May – François Benoist, composer and organist (born 1794)
- 25 May – Antoine Laurent Dantan, sculptor (born 1798)
- 6 June – Achille Baraguey d'Hilliers, Marshal of France and politician (born 1795)
- 12 June - George V of Hanover, deposed German king (born 1819)
- 2 September – Garcin de Tassy, orientalist (born 1794)
- 11 October – Félix Dupanloup, Bishop of Orléans (born 1802)
- 31 October – Louis-Antoine Garnier-Pagès, politician (born 1803)
- 8 November – Joseph-Epiphane Darras, historian (born 1825)

=== Full date unknown ===
- Amédée Faure, painter (born 1801)
