= 1883 in France =

- Decades: 1860s; 1870s; 1880s; 1890s; 1900s
- See also: History of France; Timeline of French history; List of years in France

Events from the year 1883 in France.

== Incumbents ==
- President: Jules Grévy
- President of the Council of Ministers:
  - until 29 January: Charles Duclerc
  - 29 January-21 February: Armand Fallières
  - starting 21 February: Jules Ferry

== Literature ==
- Pierre Loti - Mon Frère Yves
- Guy de Maupassant - Une vie
- Jules Verne - Kéraban-le-têtu
- Émile Zola - Au Bonheur des Dames / Pot-Bouille

== Events ==
- 27–28 March – Battle of Gia Cuc, French victory over Vietnamese forces.
- 19 May – Battle of Paper Bridge, French defeat by Black Flag forces.
- 25 August – Treaty of Hué signed between the Nguyễn dynasty Emperor of Viet Nam and the French Empire, recognizing French imperial control over the regions of Annam and Tonkin.
- De Dion-Bouton set up in Paris to manufacture mechanical road vehicles.
- The first purebred Percheron (horse) stud book is created.

== Births ==
=== January to June ===
- 5 January – Marie-Louise Bouglé, feminist, librarian, and archivist (died 1936)
- 3 February – Camille Bombois, naïve painter (died 1970)
- 18 February – Jacques Ochs, artist, épée and foil fencer and Olympic gold medallist (died 1971)
- 15 May – Maurice Feltin, Cardinal (died 1975)
- 28 June – Pierre Laval, politician and Prime Minister (executed) (died 1945)

=== July to December ===
- 19 July – Louis Paulhan, pilot (died 1963)
- 25 July – Louis Massignon, scholar and historian of Islam (died 1962)
- 19 August – Coco Chanel, fashion designer (died 1971)
- 14 September – Rose Combe, writer and railway worker (died 1932)
- 14 December – Robert Péguy, film director (died 1968)
- 16 December – Max Linder, actor (died 1925)
- 17 December – Raimu, actor (died 1946)
- 19 December – Abel Bonnard, poet, novelist and politician (died 1968)
- 22 December – Edgard Varèse, composer (died 1965)
- 26 December – Maurice Utrillo, painter (died 1955)

=== Full date unknown ===
- Charles Jourdan, fashion designer (died 1976)

== Deaths ==
- 4 January – Antoine Chanzy, general and governor of Algeria (born 1823)
- 23 January – Gustave Doré, artist, engraver, illustrator and sculptor (born 1832)
- 17 February – Napoléon Coste, guitarist and composer (born 1805)
- 24 April – Jules Sandeau, novelist (born 1811)
- 30 April – Édouard Manet, painter (born 1832)
- 5 May – Louis Viardot, writer, art historian and critic, theatrical figure, hispanophile and translator (born 1800)
- 11 May – Juliette Drouet, actress, mistress and secretary of Victor Hugo (born 1806)
- 19 May – Henri Rivière, Naval officer and writer (born 1827)
- 25 May – Édouard René de Laboulaye, jurist (born 1811)
- 20 June – Gustave Aimard, traveller and writer (born 1818)
- 11 August – Edouard Louis Dubufe, painter (born 1820)
- 24 August – Henri, comte de Chambord, Legitimist Pretender to the throne of France (born 1820)
- 6 September – Auguste Arnaud, sculptor (born 1825)
- 29 October – Henri-Marie-Gaston Boisnormand de Bonnechose, Cardinal (born 1800)
- 27 November – Charles Théodore Colet, Roman Catholic Archbishop (born 1806)
