= 1880 in France =

- Decades: 1860s; 1870s; 1880s; 1890s; 1900s
- See also: History of France; Timeline of French history; List of years in France

Events from the year 1880 in France.

== Incumbents ==
- President: Jules Grévy
- President of the Council of Ministers: Charles de Freycinet (until 23 September), Jules Ferry (starting 23 September)

== Events ==
- 29 June – France annexes Tahiti.
- Musée Carnavalet is opened to the public as a museum of Paris history.
- Discovery of piezoelectricity by Pierre Curie and Jacques Curie.

== Literature ==
- Pierre Loti - Le Mariage de Loti
- Émile Zola
  - L'Inondation
  - Nana
- Jules Verne - La Maison à vapeur

== Music ==
- Jules Massenet - La Vierge
- Jacques Offenbach - Belle Lurette

== Births ==
- 14 January – Pierre-Marie Gerlier, Cardinal (died 1965)
- 5 February – Gabriel Voisin, aviation pioneer (died 1973)
- 20 February – Jacques d'Adelswärd-Fersen, aristocrat, novelist and poet (died 1923)
- 21 February – Pierre Chaumié, politician (died 1966)
- 17 April – Jacques Suzanne, painter, artist and explorer (died 1967)
- 25 May – Jean Alexandre Barré, neurologist (died 1967)
- 26 August – Guillaume Apollinaire, poet, writer and art critic (died 1918)
- 12 October – Marcel-Bruno Gensoul, admiral (d. 1973)
- 8 December – Clément-Emile Roques, Cardinal (died 1964)

=== Full date unknown ===
- Charles Catteau, industrial designer (died 1966)
- Désiré-Émile Inghelbrecht, composer and conductor (died 1965)

== Deaths ==
- 4 January – Marthe Camille Bachasson, Count of Montalivet, statesman and Peer of France (born 1801)
- 17 January – Agenor, duc de Gramont, diplomat and statesman (born 1819)
- 31 January – Adolphe Granier de Cassagnac, journalist and politician (born 1806)
- 8 May – Gustave Flaubert, novelist (born 1821)
- 24 June – Jules Antoine Lissajous, mathematician (born 1822)
- 9 July – Paul Broca, physician, anatomist, and anthropologist (born 1824)
- 5 October - Jacques Offenbach, German composer (born 1819)
- 22 October - Alphonse Pénaud, aeronautical pioneer (born 1850)
- 10 November – Sabin Berthelot, naturalist and ethnologist (born 1794)
- 20 November – Léon Cogniet, painter (born 1794)
- 24 November – Napoléon Henri Reber, composer (born 1807)
