= 1821 in France =

- Decades: 1800s; 1810s; 1820s; 1830s; 1840s
- See also: History of France; Timeline of French history; List of years in France

Events from the year 1821 in France.

== Incumbents ==
- Monarch – Louis XVIII
- Prime Minister – Armand-Emmanuel de Vignerot du Plessis, Duc de Richelieu (until 14 December), then Joseph de Villèle

== Events ==
- 5 May - Napoleon dies in exile at Saint Helena. The cause of his death is still disputed.

== Births ==
- 11 February - Auguste Mariette, scholar and archaeologist (died 1881)
- 9 April - Charles Baudelaire, poet, critic and translator (died 1867)
- 6 June - Jean-André Cuoq, philologist (died 1898)
- 1 July - Anatole Jean-Baptiste Antoine de Barthélemy, archaeologist and numismatist (died 1904)
- 18 July - Pauline García-Viardot, mezzo-soprano and composer (died 1910)
- 29 August - Louis Laurent Gabriel de Mortillet, anthropologist (died 1898)
- 17 September - Léonard-Léopold Forgemol de Bostquénard, general (died 1897)
- 22 November - Charles Brun, naval engineer (died 1897)
- 12 December - Gustave Flaubert, novelist (died 1880)
- 27 December - Joseph Déjacque, anarcho-communist poet and writer (died 1865)
- Undated - Michel Lévy, publisher (died 1875)

== Deaths ==
- 15 March - Guy-Toussaint-Julien Carron, Roman Catholic priest and writer (born 1760)
- 17 March - Louis-Marcelin de Fontanes, poet and politician (born 1757)
- 5 May - Napoleon I of France, military and political leader (born 1769)
- 19 May
  - François-Henri de Franquetot de Coigny, Marshal of France (born 1737)
  - Camille Jordan, politician (born 1771)
- 21 June - César Guillaume de La Luzerne, Cardinal (born 1738)
- 19 August - Marie-Denise Villers, painter (born 1774)
- 18 September - Jean-Nicolas Corvisart, physician (born 1755)
- 8 November - Jean Rapp, general lieutenant (born 1771)
- Undated - Jules Granier, composer (born 1770)
