= 1811 in France =

- Decades: 1790s; 1800s; 1810s; 1820s; 1830s
- See also: History of France; Timeline of French history; List of years in France

Events from the year 1811 in France.

== Incumbents ==
- Emperor – Napoleon I

== Events ==
- 19 February – Peninsular War: Battle of the Gebora, French routed Spanish forces.
- 5 March – Peninsular War: Battle of Barrosa, tactical defeat for French.
- 13 March – Napoleonic Wars: Battle of Lissa, a British naval victory.
- 25 March – The Great Comet of 1811 is discovered by Honoré Flaugergues.
- 3 April – Peninsular War: Battle of Sabugal, Anglo-Portuguese victory.
- 14 April – Peninsular War: Siege of Almeida; siege of French garrison begins.
- 3 May–5 May – Peninsular War: Battle of Fuentes de Oñoro, Anglo-Portuguese victory, preventing French relief of the siege of Almeida.
- 10 May – Peninsular War: Siege of Almeida ends with escape of French garrison.
- 16 May – Peninsular War: Battle of Albuera, an indecisive battle.
- 25 May – Peninsular War: Battle of Usagre, Anglo-Portuguese victory.
- 25 September- Peninsular War: Battle of El Boden, French victory.
- 28 October – Peninsular War: Battle of Arroyo dos Molinos, Anglo-Portuguese victory over French forces.

== Births ==
- 18 January – Édouard René de Laboulaye, jurist (died 1883)
- 19 February – Jules Sandeau, novelist (died 1883)
- 11 March – Urbain Le Verrier, mathematician (died 1877)
- 20 March – Napoleon II, son of Napoleon Bonaparte (died 1832)
- 17 August – Alfred-Henri-Amand Mame, printer and publisher (died 1893)
- 23 August – Auguste Bravais, physicist (died 1863)
- 30 August – Théophile Gautier, poet, novelist, journalist, dramatist and literary critic (died 1872)
- 25 October – Évariste Galois, mathematician (died 1832)
- 29 October – Louis Blanc, politician and historian (died 1882)
- 30 October – Auguste-François Maunoury, Hellenist and exegete (died 1898)
- 11 November – François Delsarte, musician and teacher (died 1871)
- 15 November – Jacques-Maurice De Saint Palais, Archbishop of Indianapolis (died 1877)
- 5 December – Arthur-Marie Le Hir, Biblical scholar and Orientalist (died 1868)

=== Full date unknown ===
- Auguste Casimir-Perier, diplomat (died 1876)
- Henri Delaborde, art critic and painter (died 1899)
- Philippe Édouard Foucaux, Tibetologist (died 1894)

== Deaths ==
- 10 January – Joseph Chénier, poet, dramatist and politician (born 1764)
- 27 January – Jean-Baptiste Huet, painter, engraver and designer (born 1745)
- 13 March – Bernard Dubourdieu, Rear Admiral (born 1773)
- 28 April – Jacques-André Emery, Superior of the Society of St-Sulpice (born 1732)
- 15 May – François Amable Ruffin, General (born 1771)
- 16 May – François Werlé
- 12 March – Frederik Christian Winsløw, medal engraver (1852 1852)
- 23 June – Jean-André Valletaux
- 19 July – Raphaël Bienvenu Sabatier, anatomist and surgeon (born 1732)
- 20 August – Louis Antoine de Bougainville, navigator and military commander (born 1729)
- 27 October – Nicolas Godinot, General (born 1765)
- 17 December – Louis Abel Beffroy de Reigny, dramatist (born 1757)

=== Full date unknown ===
- Jean-Simon Berthélemy, painter (born 1743)
- Jean-Baptiste Pussin, hospital superintendent (born 1746)
- Jean-Baptiste Réveillon, paper manufacturer (born 1725)
