= 1815 in France =

- Decades: 1790s; 1800s; 1810s; 1820s; 1830s
- See also: History of France; Timeline of French history; List of years in France

Events from the year 1815 in France.

== Incumbents ==
- Monarch –
  - Until 20 March: Louis XVIII
  - 20 March – 22 June: Napoleon I
  - 22 June – 7 July: Napoleon II
  - Starting 8 July: Louis XVIII
- Prime Minister –
  - 9 July – 26 September: Charles Maurice de Talleyrand-Périgord
  - Starting 26 September: Armand-Emmanuel de Vignerot du Plessis, Duc de Richelieu

== Events ==
- 3 January - Austria, Britain, and Bourbon-restored France form a secret defensive alliance treaty against Prussia and Russia.
- 26 February - Napoleon escaped from Elba.
- 1 March - Napoleon lands at Antibes.
- 20 March - Napoleon arrives back in Paris, ending the First Restoration of Louis XVIII.
- 22 April - Constitutional Referendum held.
- 22 April - Charter of 1815 signed bringing in a new French constitution.
- 1 May - Explorer Jules Dumont d'Urville marries Adèle Dumont D'Urville (née Pepin) in Toulon.
- 16 June - Battle of Quatre Bras, inconclusive result.
- 16 June - Battle of Ligny, French defeat Prussian forces.
- 18 June - Battle of Waterloo, decisive defeat of French forces.
- 18 June-19 June - Battle of Wavre, inconclusive result.
- 24 June - Napoleon announces his abdication.
- 28 June - Battle of La Suffel, French victory over Austrian forces.
- 1 July - Battle of Rocquencourt, French victory over Prussian forces.
- 3 July - Battle of Issy, French defeat by Prussian forces.
- 8 July - Louis XVIII returns.
- 15 July - Napoleon I surrenders and is transported to England.
- 14 August - Elections to Chamber of Deputies produces a heavy ultra-royalist majority.
- 3 October - Fall of the Mars meteorite Chassigny in Chassigny, Haute-Marne.
- 7 October - Chamber of Deputies (Chambre introuvable) first assembles.
- 15 October - Napoleon begins exile on Saint Helena in the Atlantic Ocean.
- 20 November - Treaty of Paris signed following defeat and second abdication of Napoleon. Allied Occupation of France continues until November 1818.

== Births ==
=== January to June ===
- 21 February - Jean-Louis-Ernest Meissonier, painter and sculptor (died 1891)
- 24 February - Jules Achille Noël, painter (died 1881)
- 12 March - Louis Jules Trochu, soldier and statesman (died 1896)
- 28 March - Arsène Houssaye, novelist and poet (died 1896)
- 8 April - Edmond Henri Adolphe Schérer, theologian, critic and politician (died 1889)
- 9 April - Alphonse Beau de Rochas, engineer (died 1893)
- 13 April - Félix Esquirou de Parieu, statesman (died 1893)
- 25 April - Jean-François Jarjavay, anatomist and surgeon (died 1868)
- 27 April - Alexandre Martin, socialist statesman (died 1895)
- 5 May - Eugène Marin Labiche, dramatist (died 1888)
- 8 May - Jean-Delphin Alard, violinist (died 1888)

=== July to December ===
- 6 July - Louis Pierre Gratiolet, anatomist and zoologist (died 1865)
- 24 July - Arnaud-Michel d'Abbadie, geographer (died 1893)
- 16 August - Madame Céleste, actress (died 1882)
- 26 August - Bernard Jauréguiberry, Admiral and statesman (died 1887)
- 3 December - Louis de Loménie, scholar, essayist and biographer (died 1878)
- 21 December - Thomas Couture, painter and teacher (died 1879)

=== Full date unknown ===
- Jean Baptiste Prosper Bressant, actor (died 1886)
- Jacques-Eugène Feyen, painter (died 1908)
- Louis Dominique Girard, hydraulic engineer (died 1871)
- Honoré Jacquinot, surgeon and zoologist (died 1887)

== Deaths ==
=== January to June ===
- 11 January - Jean-Baptiste de Caffarelli du Falga, churchman (born 1763)
- 15 January - Emma, Lady Hamilton, mistress of Horatio Nelson (born 1765 in Great Britain)
- 18 January - Stanislas de Boufflers, statesman and writer (born 1738)
- 12 February - Étienne Marie Antoine Champion de Nansouty, General (born 1768)
- 17 April - Charles de la Bédoyère, General (born 1786)
- 1 June - Louis Alexandre Berthier, Marshal of France (born 1753)
- 18 June - Claude-Etienne Michel, General (born 1772)
- 18 June - Guillaume Philibert Duhesme, General (born 1766)

=== July to December ===
- 2 August - Guillaume Marie Anne Brune, Marshal of France (born 1763)
- 14 August - Jean Auguste de Chastenet de Puységur, Bishop (born 1740)
- 20 September - Nicolas Desmarest, geologist (born 1725)
- 13 October - Joachim Murat, Marshal of France, brother-in-law of Napoleon (born 1767)
- 22 October - Claude Lecourbe, General (born 1759)
- 11 November - Pierre-Louis Ginguené, author (born 1748)
- 7 December - Michel Ney, Marshal of France (born 1769)

=== Full date unknown ===
- Geneviève Brossard de Beaulieu, painter
- Philippe Henri, Comte de Grimoard, soldier and military writer (born 1753)
