= 1810 in France =

- Decades: 1790s; 1800s; 1810s; 1820s; 1830s
- See also: History of France; Timeline of French history; List of years in France

Events from the year 1810 in France.

== Incumbents ==
- Emperor – Napoleon I

== Events ==
- 6 January - Treaty of Paris ends war between France and Sweden.
- 10 January - Marriage of Napoleon and Joséphine de Beauharnais is annulled.
- 11 March - Napoleon marries Marie-Louise of Austria.
- 26 April - Peninsular War: Siege of Ciudad Rodrigo begins. Spanish garrison besieged by French forces.
- 9 July - Napoleon annexes the Kingdom of Holland.
- 9 July - Peninsular War: Siege of Ciudad Rodrigo ends in French victory.
- 24 July - Peninsular War: Battle of the Côa.
- 25 July - Peninsular War: Siege of Almeida begins. French lay siege to British and Portuguese forces.
- 20 August - Napoleonic Wars: Battle of Grand Port, Mauritius. French victory over British fleet.
- 21 August - One of Napoleon's marshals, Jean Baptiste Bernadotte, was elected crown prince of Sweden.
- 27 August - Peninsular War: Siege of Almeida ends with French victory.
- 27 September - Battle of Bussaco, Anglo-Portuguese victory over the French.
- Peugeot engineering business established.
- Dominique Larrey makes the first ambulances.
- 5 November – Salon of 1810 opens at the Louvre in Paris

== Births ==
=== January to June ===
- 17 January - Antoine Léon Morel-Fatio, painter (died 1871)
- 21 January - Pierre Louis Charles de Failly, General (died 1892)
- 4 February - Alexis Soyer, chef (died 1858 in the United Kingdom)
- 8 February - Eliphas Levi, occult author and magician (died 1875)
- 25 March - Pierre-Jules Mêne, sculptor (died 1879)
- 4 April - Désirée Gay, socialist feminist (died c.1891)
- 8 April - Hégésippe Moreau, poet (died 1838)
- 13 April - Félicien-César David, composer (died 1876)
- 23 April - Eugène Belgrand,

engineer (died 1878)

- 28 June - Célestin Joseph Félix, Jesuit (died 1891)

=== July to December ===
- 14 July - Aristide Boucicaut, creator of Le Bon Marché department stores (died 1877)
- 21 July - Henri Victor Regnault, chemist and physicist (died 1878)
- 4 August - Maurice de Guérin, poet (died 1839)
- 15 August - Louise Colet, poet (died 1876)
- 16 August - Eugène Hilarian Abadie, U.S. Army surgeon (died 1874)
- 12 September - Ernest Courtot de Cissey, General (died 1882)
- 22 September - Louis-Auguste Desmarres, ophthalmologist (died 1882)
- 29 October - Sophie d'Arbouville, writer (died 1850)
- 8 November - Pierre Bosquet, Marshal of France (died 1861)
- 7 December - Theodor Schwann, German physiologist (died 1882)
- 11 December - Alfred de Musset, dramatist, poet and novelist (died 1857)

=== Full date unknown ===
- Louise Rosalie Allan-Despreaux, actress (died 1856)
- Baron de César Bazancourt, military historian (died 1865)
- François Edmond Eugène de Barlatier de Mas, naval officer

== Deaths ==
=== January to June ===
- 1 March - Jean-Jacques de Boissieu, painter (born 1736)
- 2 May - Jean-Louis Baudelocque, obstetrician (born 1745)
- 21 May - Chevalier d'Eon, diplomat, spy and soldier who lived the first half of her life as a man and the second half as a woman (born 1728)
- 29 May - François-Urbain Domergue, grammarian and journalist (born 1745)
- 26 June - Joseph-Michel Montgolfier, airship inventor (born 1740)

=== July to December ===
- 12 August - Étienne Louis Geoffroy, entomologist (born 1725)
- 13 August - Jacques-François Menou, General (born 1750)
- 19 October - Jean-Georges Noverre, dancer and balletmaster (born 1727)
- 23 October - Jean Baptiste Marie Franceschi-Delonne, General (born 1767)
- 26 October - Alexandre-Antoine Hureau de Sénarmont, Artillery General (born 1769)
- 1 December - Jean Baptiste Treilhard, politician (born 1742)
- 8 December - Ange-François Fariau, poet and translator (born 1747)

=== Full date unknown ===
- Charles-Claude Flahaut de la Billaderie, comte d'Angiviller, director of the Bâtiments du Roi (born 1730)
- François Cabarrus, adventurer (born 1752)
- Esprit Calvet, physician and collector (born 1728)
- Antoine-Denis Chaudet, sculptor (born 1763)
- Jean-Marie Morel, architect and surveyor (born 1728)
- François Péron, naturalist and explorer (born 1775)
