= Marcel Boucher =

Marcel Boucher (1898–1965) was a French jeweller where he was trained in the art of fine jewelry. His father died when he was very young, so he was raised by his single mother, who was a seamstress. During the first World War he volunteered for the Ambulanciers Corps Français; as he was the only son of a widow, he was not likely to be deployed to the front lines. He moved to the US in the early 20s and in 1925, he moved to New York City, where he developed a passion for jewellery design, By the 1930s, he was working for Mazer Brothers, where he expertly applied his knowledge of fine jewelry to the design of costume jewelry. His designs influenced the Mazer designs even after he left them to establish his own company in 1937, which he called Marcel Boucher and Cie. His first line of brooches was bought by Saks. In 1949 he hired Raymonde Semensohn, later known as Sandra Semensohn, whom he married in 1964.

== Costume jewellery by Boucher ==
Jewelry by Boucher is almost always signed (meaning a marking signifying authenticity was put on the piece) and has an inventory number on it somewhere. Some of the earliest marks say 'Marboux' or 'MB.' He produced many different pieces like bracelets and necklaces but he is most known for his brooches, which are most sought after by collectors.

Boucher used white metal in his pieces, but the entry of the US in World War II meant that metal was scarce. At that point, Boucher began using silver in his work, even moving to Mexico for a brief stint to utilize the silver there.

His brooches were often made to look 3D, sometimes with several layers. They were especially popular for their intricate naturalistic designs with flowing lines suggesting movement. Although Boucher produced costume jewelry, it was priced similarly to higher-end jewelry such as Eisenberg and Trifari. His prices rose along with the reputation of the brand, from $3 - $10 in the 1930s up to $25 - $45 in the 1950s. Inspired by his work in fine jewelry houses, pieces produced after 1945 were each given an inventory number. This makes historical classification today much easier, as specific numbers on the pieces correlate with the production year of the piece. For example, the inventory numbers from 2300 to 2350 date from 1945.

== Boucher's death ==
In 1965, Boucher died, and his wife Sandra (who had worked for Harry Winston) took over her husband's company. The company was made a subsidiary sometime between 1970 and 1972 of Davorn Industries. Sandra went on to work for Ciner, New York.
