= André Badonnel =

French entomologist

André Badonnel (5 July 1898 Épinal, Vosges -30 April 1991) was a French entomologist who specialised in Psocoptera. He wrote Faune de France. Psocoptères. Paris. Paul Lechevalier 1943. His collection is in the Natural History Museum of Geneva.

== Sources ==
- Lhoste, J., 1987 Les Entomologistes francais 1750 - 1950. INRA, OPIE (Entomology): 115 [A1036].
