= André Debry =

- Born: 15 June 1898; Villers-Bocage
- Died: 31 August 2005 (aged 107); Argenton-sur-Creuse
- Military career
- Allegiance: France
- Branch: French army
- Conflicts: World War I
- Other work: Teacher

André Léon Alphonse Debry (15 June 1898 – 31 August 2005) was, at age 107, one of the last ten surviving French veterans of the First World War. He was later created an officer of the Legion d'Honneur, both for his war record, and for his work as principal of a school.

Debry was born in Villers-Bocage (Calvados). He was a soldier in the First World War. After the war, he met Marguerite Céline Pingaud, the woman he later married on 12 August 1924 in his home town.

In 2005, André and Marguerite Debry were able to celebrate their 81st wedding anniversary; this set a record for the longest ever marriage in France at the time and even the longest in the world for a living couple. They lived together in Argenton-sur-Creuse (Indre) until his death, aged 107. She died four months afterwards, aged 101.
