= Louis-Frédéric Brugère =

Louis-Frédéric Brugère (8 October 1823, in Orléans – 11 April 1888, in Issy) was a Roman Catholic professor of apologetics and church history.

== Biography ==
He studied with the Christian Brothers at St. Euverte, and at the Petit Séminaire of Orléans. His poem of 300 lines describing an inundation of the Rhône and composed in 1841 was printed and sold for the benefit of the flood victims at Lyon. He entered the Grand Séminaire of Orléans in 1841 and the Paris Séminaire in 1845, where he received the degrees of Bachelor of Licentiate and Doctor. From 1846 to 1861, with the exception of two years spent as assistant in the parish of St. Aignan, Brugère taught the classics and philosophy in the Orléans diocesan college of La Chapelle-saint-Mesmin. In 1862 he entered the Society of Saint-Sulpice and was appointed professor of apologetics in the seminary of Paris where, in 1868, he occupied the chair of church history in addition to his other labours.

== Teaching ==
Brugère's teaching was characterized by rare tact and discernment. It was his conviction that, in order to assist in the establishment of communication between the naturally darkened mind and the radiance of revealed truth, the Christian apologist must consider the individual mental attitudes of those whom he would direct. Thus he was a strong advocate of the methodus ascendens ab intrinseco, which was introduced towards the end of the fifteenth century, described in the Catholic Encyclopedia this way:

[It] holds that the apologist should first arouse interest by setting forth the needy condition of the human soul, with its problems unsolved and its cravings unsatisfied; then gradually suggest the unchanging organization which offers satisfaction and peace. Curiosity and interest thus intensified, and the admirable adjustment of Christianity to the needs of the soul once recognized, fairmindedness urging further research, the honest inquirer will learn how moral certitude, though differing from metaphysical and physical certitude, is nevertheless true certitude, excluding all reasonable fear of error, and is not to be confounded with probability, however great. Thus, only when prepared to recognize in the genuine miracle the credentials of the Divinity, may this inquirer be conducted back through history, from fulfilment to prediction, in the hope of discovering, by well authenticated miracles, that the Almighty has stamped as His own the Christianity preserved, defended, and explained by His one true Church.

Such, in brief outline, is the method advocated in De Verâ Religione and De Ecclesia, two treatises which Brugère published in 1873. In addition to these treatises, Brugère published Tableau de l'histoire et de la littérature de l'Eglise. But it is chiefly as a professor that Brugère is remembered. Gifted with a remarkable memory, his mind was a storehouse of exact information which he freely imparted, embellishing it with anecdote and illustration, so that students gladly sought him out for pleasure and profit.
