= Maurice Journeau =

French composer (1898–1999)

Maurice Journeau (17 November 1898 – 9 June 1999) was a French composer born in Biarritz. He composed from 1921 to 1984. He died in Versailles.

== Works ==
- Works for piano
  - Valse
  - Deux mélodies
  - Fugue
  - Quatuor à cordes
  - Sur l'Etang
  - Pièces enfantines
  - Ronde enfantine
  - Humoresque
  - Suite pour les jeunes
  - Divertissement pour deux pianos
  - Simple Cantilène
  - Le Furet
  - Toccata
  - Impromptus
