= Serre laws =

The Serre laws governed press freedom in France for much of the nineteenth century after being enacted in May 1819.
