= Nicolas Édouard Delabarre-Duparcq =

French military critic and historian

Nicolas Édouard Delabarre-Duparcq (1819–1893) was a French military critic and historian, born at Saint-Cloud, Seine-et-Oise. He studied at the Ecole Polytechnique and in 1849 was appointed professor of military history at the École Spéciale Militaire de Saint-Cyr. Having entered the engineers in 1841, he rose in 1871 to the rank of colonel and was retired in 1879. He wrote in addition to memoirs for the Academy of Moral and Political Sciences:

- Biographie et maximes de Maurice de Saxe (1851)
- Portraits militaires, Esquisses historiques et stratégiques (two volumes, 1853–1855)
- Les chiens de guerre (1867)
- Histoire de Henri IV, roi de France et de Navarre (1884).
