= Louis Aubert-Roche =

French physician

Louis Rémy Aubert-Roche (26 November 1818 – 22 December 1874) was a French medical doctor born in Vitry-le-François. He was an authority on contagious diseases and medical officer at the construction of the Suez Canal.

He is remembered for an 1840 publication titled De la peste ou typhus d'Orient: Documens et observations recueillis pendant les années 1834 à 1838, en Egypte, en Arabie, sur la Mer Rouge, en Abyssinie à Smyrne et à Constantinople, in which he describes his medical observations in North Africa and southwestern Asia. In this book he mentions the possibilities of using hashish for treatment of the plague and typhoid fever. This belief was based on his observance that Egyptians who indulged in hashish seemed to be less susceptible to diseases that affected Europeans.

Aubert-Roche was not the first 19th century physician to mention the medical possibilities of cannabis-based drugs. In 1839, William Brooke O'Shaughnessy (1809-1889) of the British East India Company published a treatise called On the Preparation of the Indian Hemp or Gunja, Transactions of the Medical and Physical Society of Bengal.
