= Augustin Marie Morvan =

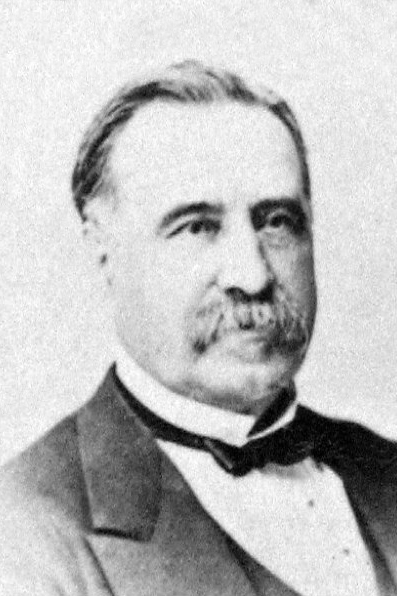

Augustin Marie Morvan (7 February 1819 in Lannilis – 20 March 1897 in Douarnenez) was a French physician, politician, and writer.

He is best known for treating the first recorded case of the eponymous Morvan's syndrome, a rare neurological disorder marked by acute insomnia.

Morvan served as a deputy to the French National Assembly that inaugurated the Third Republic in 1871.

In Brest, France, where he began his medical studies, the Rue Augustin Morvan and the Hôpital Augustin Morvan are named after him.

== Sources ==
- whonamedit.com
