= Alexis Tendil =

Alexis Tendil (12 August 1896, Le Teil, Ardèche – 5 October 2005) was, at age 109, one of the last few surviving French veterans of the First World War. He died in a hospital following a fall.

== World War I ==
In October 1918 Tendil intercepted a message from the Germany High Command which informed the then-Pope Benedict XV of the imminent intention of the German forces to capitulate.

He informed the French command of his discovery and a planned, massive offensive by the French army was postponed.

After the war, although returning to his ordinary job as an electrician, Tendil became something of a hero being rightly accredited, by his actions, with preventing the deaths of many more soldiers.
