= Georges Andrique =

French painter

Georges Andriques (2 November 1874 – 1964) was a French Impressionist painter. He was born and died in Calais. He largely painted in oils but also worked with watercolours. Andrique produced a number of posters including advertisements for the port of Calais. He remains relatively unknown, partly as a result of a significant body of his work being destroyed in a fire in the 1940s.

He was awarded the Chevalier de la Légion d'honneur in 1962.
