= Pierre Mollaret =

French neurologist (1898–1987)

- Born: 10 July 1898; Auxerre, France
- Died: 3 December 1987 (aged 89); Paris, France
- Known for: infectious diseases neurology
- Scientific career
- Fields: neurology

Pierre Mollaret (10 July 1898 – 3 December 1987) was a French neurologist who made significant scientific contributions to the study of infectious diseases and neurology.

He was born July 10, 1898 in Auxerre, France and died December 3, 1987 in Paris. A rare disease characterized by recurrent episodes of aseptic meningitis was discovered by Mollaret, and subsequently named after him - called Mollaret's meningitis, this disease is typically caused by herpes simplex virus infection of the brain.

In 1959 he described with Pierre Mollaret the brain death, called by them coma dépassé. Additionally, Mollaret is credited with characterizing a neural pathway known as the Guillain-Mollaret triangle or Myoclonic triangle, and the discovery of the causative agent of cat-scratch disease.
