= 1907 in France =

- Decades: 1880s; 1890s; 1900s; 1910s; 1920s
- See also: History of France; Timeline of French history; List of years in France

Events from the year 1907 in France.

== Incumbents ==
- President: Armand Fallières
- President of the Council of Ministers: Georges Clemenceau

== Events ==
- 2 January – Latest Anti-clericalism laws comes into force, which forbids crucifixes in schools
- 11 February – The French cruiser Jean Bart sinks off the coast of Morocco.
- March – ESSEC Business School is founded.
- 12 March – The French battleship Iéna blows up at Toulon; 120 lives lost.
- 6 April – Louis Blériot flies his new monoplane ten yards.
- 10 April – French doctors announce the discovery of a new serum to cure dysentery.
- 18 April – Georges Clemenceau orders dismissal of striking civil servants; army mobilised for fear of May Day unrest.
- 17 May – Several thousand riot during the revolt of the Languedoc winegrowers at Béziers in the south of France.
- 9 June – Aviator Alberto Santos-Dumont's combined aeroplane and airship is wrecked in its first trial
- 28 June – Georges Clemenceau wins a majority in the Chamber of Deputies.
- 12 July – Major Alfred Dreyfus resigns from the army, one year after his rehabilitation.
- 14 July – President Armand Fallières narrowly escapes an assassination attempt.
- 10 August – Peking to Paris motor race concludes.
- 18 December – Louis Blériot's demonstrations of his new aeroplane at Issy end in its destruction.

== Literature ==
- Guillaume Apollinaire - Les Onze Mille Verges
- Gaston Leroux - Le mystère de la chambre jaune
- Octave Mirbeau - La 628-E8
- Michel Verne - L’Agence Thompson and Co

== Sport ==
- 8 July – Tour de France begins.
- 4 August – Tour de France ends, won by Lucien Petit-Breton.

== Births ==
=== January to March ===
- 8 January – Jean Hyppolite, philosopher (died 1968)
- 11 January – Pierre Mendès France, politician and Prime Minister of France (died 1982)
- 24 January – Maurice Couve de Murville, politician and Prime Minister (died 1999)
- 5 February – Pierre Pflimlin, politician and Prime Minister (died 2000)
- 15 February
  - Célestin Delmer, international soccer player (died 1996)
  - Jean Langlais, composer and organist (died 1991)
- 22 March – Roger Blin, comedian and actor (died 1984)

=== April to June ===
- 7 April – Violette Leduc, author (died 1972)
- 10 April – Marcel Simon, historian (died 1986)
- 12 April – Eugène Chaboud, motor racing driver (died 1983)
- 15 April – Jean Fourastié, economist (died 1990)
- 28 April – Henri Michel, historian (died 1986)
- 29 April – Tino Rossi, singer and actor (died 1983)
- 22 May – Jean Beaufret, philosopher and Germanist (died 1982)
- 23 May – Ginette Mathiot, food writer (died 1998)
- 26 May – Jean Bernard, physician and haematologist (died 2006)
- 30 May – Germaine Tillion, anthropologist (died 2008)
- 12 June – Émile Veinante, soccer player and coach (died 1983)
- 14 June – René Char, poet (died 1988)
- 17 June – Maurice Cloche, film director, screenwriter and film producer (died 1990)
- 24 June – Jean Schlumberger, jewelry designer (died 1987)

=== July to September ===
- 7 July – Louis-Jean Guyot, Cardinal (died 1988)
- 5 August – Eugène Guillevic, poet (died 1997)
- 7 September – Roland Mousnier, historian (died 1993)
- 22 September – Maurice Blanchot, writer, philosopher, and literary theorist (died 2003)
- 23 September – Anne Desclos, journalist and novelist (died 1998)

=== October to December ===
- 1 October – Maurice Bardèche, essayist, literary and art critic, journalist and Neo-Fascist (died 1998)
- 4 October – Alain Daniélou, historian, musicologist and Indologist (died 1994)
- 5 October – Jean Louis, costume designer (died 1997)
- 8 October – Pierre Bertaux, Germanist (died 1986)
- 9 October – Jacques Tati, comedic filmmaker (died 1982)
- 13 October – Yves Allégret, film director (died 1987)
- 16 October – Roger Vailland, novelist, essayist, and screenwriter (died 1965)
- 17 October – Marcel Barbu, politician (died 1984)
- 29 October – Edwige Feuillère, actress (died 1998)
- 1 November
  - Paul Bacon, politician (died 1999)
  - Edmond Delfour, international soccer player, manager (died 1990)
- 3 November – Raymond Bussières, actor (died 1982)
- 6 November – Raymond Savignac, graphic artist (died 2002)
- 18 November – Pierre Dreyfus, civil servant and businessman (died 1994)
- 19 November – Fernand Cornez, cyclist (died 1997)
- 20 November – Henri-Georges Clouzot, film director, screenwriter and producer (died 1977)
- 30 November – Jacques Barzun, historian (died 2012)
- 10 December
  - Daniel Barbier, astronomer (died 1965)
  - Lucien Laurent, international soccer player, scored the first ever World Cup goal (died 2005)
- 16 December – Jacques Pâris de Bollardière, General (died 1986)
- 24 December – André Cailleux, paleontologist and geologist (died 1986)

== Deaths ==
- 20 January – Louis Émile Javal, ophthalmologist (born 1839)
- 25 January – René Pottier, cyclist, winner of 1906 Tour de France (born 1879)
- 16 February – Princess Clémentine of Orléans, youngest daughter of Louis-Philippe, King of the French (born 1817)
- 20 February – Henri Moissan, chemist, Nobel Prize laureate (born 1852)
- 21 February – Jacques-Marie-Louis Monsabré, priest and orator (born 1827)
- 11 March – Jean Casimir-Perier, politician, fifth president of the French Third Republic (born 1847)
- 18 March – Marcellin Berthelot, chemist and politician (born 1827)
- 12 May – Joris-Karl Huysmans, novelist (born 1848)
- 13 July – Jacques-Joseph Grancher, pediatrician (born 1843)
- 16 July – Théobald Chartran, painter (born 1849)
- 6 September – Sully Prudhomme, poet and essayist, winner of first Nobel Prize in Literature in 1901 (born 1839)
- 21 September – Pierre Adolphe Adrien Doyon, dermatologist (born 1827)
- 1 November – Alfred Jarry, playwright and novelist (born 1873)

== See also ==
- List of French films before 1910
