= Théophile Nicolas Noblot =

French politician (1824–1891)

Théophile Nicolas Noblot (11 January 1824, Arconville - 17 June 1891) was a French republican politician. He was a member of the National Assembly in 1871 and of the Chamber of Deputies from 1883 to 1889.
