= 1901 in France =

- Decades: 1880s; 1890s; 1900s; 1910s; 1920s
- See also: History of France; Timeline of French history; List of years in France

Events from the year 1901 in France.

== Incumbents ==
- President: Émile Loubet
- President of the Council of Ministers: Pierre Waldeck-Rousseau

== Events ==
- 17 March – A showing of 71 Vincent van Gogh paintings in Paris, 11 years after his death, creates a sensation.
- 4 April – first issue of L'Assiette au beurre, satirical magazine created by Samuel-Sigismond Schwarz
- 10 August – Moberly-Jourdain incident.
- 19 October – Alberto Santos-Dumont manages to reach the distance between Saint-Cloud and the Eiffel Tower in an airship in less than 30 minutes and wins the Deutsch prize of 100,000 gold francs

== Literature ==
- René Boylesve - La Becquée
- Octave Mirbeau - Les Vingt et un Jours d'un neurasthénique
- Jules Verne
  - Les Histoires de Jean-Marie Cabidoulin
  - Le Village aérien

== Music ==
- Claude Debussy - Pour le piano
- Paul Dukas - Piano Sonata
- Jules Massenet - Grisélidis
- Maurice Ravel - Myrrha
- Camille Saint-Saëns - Les barbares

== Sport ==
- 1 January – The French rugby team plays its first Test against the New Zealand All Blacks.

== Births ==
=== January to March ===
- 1 January – Marcel Balsa, motor racing driver (died 1984)
- 2 January – Louis Poterat, lyricist (died 1982)
- 8 January – Eugène Constant, rower and Olympic medallist (died 1971)
- 19 January – Henri Daniel-Rops, writer and historian (died 1965)
- 24 January – Adolphe Mouron Cassandre, painter, commercial poster artist and typeface designer (died 1968)
- 20 February
  - Marc Detton, rower and Olympic medallist (died 1977)
  - René Dubos, microbiologist, experimental pathologist, environmentalist and humanist (died 1982)
- 21 February
  - Albert Dupouy, rugby union player (died 1973)
  - Pierre Lewden, athlete (died 1989)
- 3 March – Corentin Louis Kervran, scientist (died 1983)
- 17 March – Alexandre Bioussa, rugby union player (died 1966)
- 26 March – Maurice Dorléac, actor (died 1979)

=== April to June ===
- 7 April –
  - André Trocmé, pastor who aided Jewish refugees (died 1971)
  - Annemarie von Gabain, German linguist (died 1993)
- 8 April – Jean Prouvé, architect and designer (died 1984)
- 13 April – Jacques Lacan, psychoanalyst, psychiatrist, and doctor (died 1981)
- 15 April – René Pleven, politician (died 1993)
- 20 April – Michel Leiris, surrealist writer and ethnographer (died 1990)
- 24 April – René Le Hénaff, film editor and director (died 2005)
- 15 May – Jacques Natanson, writer (died 1975)
- 18 May - Henri Sauguet, composer (died 1989)
- 25 May
  - Jean Borthayre, operatic baritone (died 1984)
  - André Girard, painter, poster-maker and Resistance member (died 1968)
- 31 May – Charles Brunier, convicted murderer and veteran of the First and Second World Wars who claimed to have been the inspiration for Papillon (died 2007)
- 13 June – Jean Prévost, writer, journalist and member of the Maquis (died 1944)
- 16 June – Henri Lefebvre, sociologist and philosopher (died 1991)
- 24 June – Marcel Mule, classical saxophonist (died 2001)
- 26 June – Jean Boyer, film director and author (died 1965)

=== July to September ===
- 20 July – Gaston Waringhien, linguist, lexicographer and Esperantist (died 1991)
- 31 July – Jean Dubuffet, painter and sculptor (died 1985)
- 5 August – Claude Autant-Lara, film director and later MEP (died 2000)
- 17 August – Henri Tomasi, composer and conductor (died 1971)
- 18 August
  - Lucienne Boyer, singer (died 1983)
  - Jean Guitton, Catholic philosopher and theologian (died 1999)
- 19 August – René Capitant, lawyer and politician (died 1970)
- 27 August – Pierre Villon, member of the French Communist Party and of the French Resistance (died 1980)
- 29 August – Michel Olçomendy, first Archbishop of the Singapore (died 1977)
- 8 September – Jacques Perret, writer (died 1992)
- 13 September – Claude Dupuy, Roman Catholic archbishop (died 1989)
- 16 September
  - Andrée Brunet, figure skater (died 1993)
  - Louis Joxe, statesman and Minister (died 1991)
- 25 September – Robert Bresson, film director (died 1999)

=== October to December ===
- 3 October
  - Jean Grémillon, film director (died 1959)
  - François Le Lionnais, chemical engineer and mathematician (died 1984)
- 12 October – Gabriel-Marie Garrone, Cardinal (died 1994)
- 3 November – André Malraux, author, adventurer and statesman (died 1976)
- 14 December – Henri Cochet, tennis player (died 1987)
- 21 December – Roland Ansieau, graphic artist (died 1987)

== Deaths ==
- 5 January – Pierre Potain, cardiologist (born 1825)
- 13 January – Gaspard Adolphe Chatin, physician, mycologist and botanist (born 1813)
- 16 January – Jules Barbier, poet and librettist (born 1825)
- 28 January – Henri de Bornier, poet and dramatist (born 1825)
- 9 February – Louis-Nicolas Ménard, man of letters (born 1822)
- 17 March – Jean-Charles Cazin, landscape painter and ceramicist (born 1840)
- 29 March – Xavier Barbier de Montault, theologian (born 1830)
- 9 June – Casimir Marie Gaudibert, astronomer and selenographer (born 1823)
- 28 July – Paul Alexis, novelist, dramatist and journalist (born 1847)
- 12 August – Ernest de Jonquières, mathematician (born 1820)
- 17 August – Edmond Audran, composer (born 1840)
- 9 September – Henri de Toulouse-Lautrec, painter (born 1864)
- date unknown
  - Henriette Browne, painter and traveller (born 1829)
  - Charles Jalabert, painter (born 1819)

== See also ==
- List of French films before 1910
