= 1964 in France =

- Decades: 1940s; 1950s; 1960s; 1970s; 1980s
- See also: History of France; Timeline of French history; List of years in France

Events from the year 1964 in France.

== Incumbents ==
- President: Charles de Gaulle
- Prime Minister: Georges Pompidou

== Events ==
- 27 January – France and the People's Republic of China announce their decision to establish diplomatic relations.
- 11 February – The Republic of China (Taiwan) drops diplomatic relations with France because of French recognition of the People's Republic of China.
- 8-15 March – Cantonal elections held.
- 23 May – Mrs. Madeleine Dassault, 63, wife of French plane manufacturer and politician Marcel Dassault, is kidnapped while leaving her car in front of her Paris home; she is found unharmed the next day in a farmhouse 27 miles from Paris.

== The arts ==
- 19 February – Jacques Demy's musical film The Umbrellas of Cherbourg (Les Parapluies de Cherbourg) is released.

== Sport ==
- 22 June – Tour de France begins.
- 14 July – Tour de France ends, won by Jacques Anquetil.

== Births ==
=== January to March ===
- 6 January – Loïc Courteau, tennis player
- 7 January – Hervé Balland, cross-country skier
- 10 January – Claude Morinière, long jumper
- 11 January – Albert Dupontel, actor and film director
- 24 January – Gérald Passi, soccer player
- 1 February – Philippe Casado, cyclist (died 1995)
- 12 February – Stéphane Franke, athlete (died 2011)
- 14 February – Frédéric Delcourt, swimmer and Olympic medallist
- 17 February – Thierry Laurey, soccer player
- 27 February – Christian Penigaud, beach volleyball player
- 28 February – Pierre Hantaï, conductor and harpsichordist
- 1 March – Paul Le Guen, soccer manager
- 5 March – Bertrand Cantat, singer and songwriter
- 9 March – Juliette Binoche, actress
- 16 March – Franck Fréon, motor racing driver
- 24 March – Chantal Mauduit, alpinist (died 1998)
- 30 March – Christophe Robert, soccer player

=== April to June ===
- 2 April – Didier Tholot, soccer manager
- 14 April – Emmanuel Villaume, conductor
- 5 May – Jean-François Copé, politician
- 10 May – Emmanuelle Devos, actress
- 12 May – Pierre Morel, film director and cinematographer
- 23 May – Laurent Naouri, bass-baritone
- 27 May – Yves Caumon, film director
- 31 May – Stéphane Caristan, athlete
- 3 June – Jérôme Pradon, actor and singer
- 5 June – Jean-François Remésy, golfer
- 11 June – Jean Alesi, motor racing driver
- 12 June – Philippe Bouvatier, cyclist.
- 21 June – Patrice Bailly-Salins, biathlete and Olympic medallist
- 24 June – Philippe Fargeon, soccer player
- 27 June – Serge Le Dizet, soccer player, coach

=== July to September ===
- 1 July – Bernard Laporte, rugby union player and coach, Secretary of State for Sport
- 3 July – Yeardley Smith, voice actress
- 13 July – Pascal Hervé, cyclist
- 21 July – Fabrice Colas, cyclist
- 4 August – Sebastian Roché, actor
- 24 August – Éric Bernard, motor racing driver
- September – Olivier Zahm, art critic, curator, fashion editor, and art director
- 2 September – Jean-Christophe Spinosi, conductor and violinist
- 14 September – Laurent Fournier, soccer player, manager
- 16 September – Nicolas Hénard, sailor and Olympic gold medallist

=== October to December ===
- 16 October – Jean-Christophe Thomas, soccer player
- 19 October – Agnès Jaoui, screenwriter, film director, actress and singer
- 8 December – Éric Aubijoux, motorcycle racer (died 2007)
- 8 December – Laurent Croci, soccer player
- 19 December – Béatrice Dalle, actress
- 24 December – Jean-Paul Civeyrac, film director
- 30 December – Pascal Baills, soccer player

=== Full date unknown ===
- Éric Chevillard, novelist
- Stéphane Cornicard, actor and director
- Philippe Graffin, violinist and recording artist
- Jean-Michel Othoniel, artist
- Jérôme Soimaud, painter

== Deaths ==
=== January to June ===
- 11 January – André-Damien-Ferdinand Jullien, cardinal (born 1882)
- 13 January – Pierre Yvert, philatelic editor (born 1900)
- 10 February – Paul Baudouin, banker and politician (born 1894)
- 15 February – Reginald Garrigou-Lagrange, Catholic theologian (born 1877)
- 17 February – Philippe Cattiau, fencer and Olympic gold medallist (born 1892)
- 25 February – Maurice Farman, motor racing driver, aviator, aircraft manufacturer and designer (born 1877)
- 17 May – Honoré Barthélemy, cyclist (born 1890)
- 30 May – René-Yves Creston, artist, designer and ethnographer (born 1898)
- 17 June – René Crabos, rugby union player (born 1899)

=== July to December ===
- 1 July – Pierre Monteux, conductor (born 1875)
- 7 July – Charles Bozon, alpine skier and world champion (born 1932)
- 11 July – Maurice Thorez, communist politician (born 1900)
- 21 July – Jean Fautrier, painter and sculptor (born 1898)
- 4 September – Clément-Emile Roques, cardinal (born 1880)
- 7 September – Georges Thierry d'Argenlieu, Admiral (born 1889)
- 9 September – Maurice Le Boucher, organist, composer, and pedagogue (born 1882)
- 20 September – Lazare Lévy, pianist, composer and teacher (born 1882)
- 27 October – Gabriel Benoist, writer (born 1891)
- 8 November – Fernand Baldet, astronomer (born 1885)
- 22 December – Paul Tournon, architect (born 1881)

=== Full date unknown ===
- Georges Andrique, painter (born 1874).
- Pierre Brissaud, illustrator, painter and engraver (born 1885)
- Jean Dupas, painter, designer, poster artist and decorator (born 1882)

== See also ==
- List of French films of 1964
