= 1972 in France =

- Decades: 1950s; 1960s; 1970s; 1980s; 1990s
- See also: History of France; Timeline of French history; List of years in France

The following events occurred in France in the year 1972.

== Incumbents ==
- President: Georges Pompidou
- Prime Minister: Jacques Chaban-Delmas (until 5 July), Pierre Messmer (starting 6 July)

== Events ==
- January – Launch of the Renault 5, one of the world's first small hatchbacks.
- 23 April – French European Economic Community enlargement referendum, voters approved the accession of the United Kingdom, Denmark, Ireland, and Norway to the EEC.
- 11 June – Henri Pescarolo (France) with co-driver Graham Hill (UK) win the 24 Hours of Le Mans in the Equipe Matra MS670.
- 16 June – 108 die as two passenger trains hit debris of a collapsed railway tunnel near Soissons.
- 1 July – Canadian ketch Vega, flying the Greenpeace III banner, collides with the French naval minesweeper La Paimpolaise while in international waters to protest French nuclear weapon tests in the South Pacific.
- 5 July – President Pompidou dismisses prime minister Chaban-Delmas following rumours of financial misdoing.
- October – The Peugeot 104, the smallest four-door car in the world, is launched.
- 28 October – The first flight of the Airbus A300, the first airliner built by Airbus.
- 6 November – Activist couple Saïd and Faouzia Bouziri in Goutte d'Or district begin a hunger strike to protest the expulsion order against them, which they received due to their human rights and immigrant rights activism
- 19 November – Almost 2,000 people demonstrate in support of Saïd and Faouzia Bouziri at the square within Quartier de La Chapelle, forcing the expulsion order to be dropped
- 28 November – The last executions in Paris: Roger Bontems and Claude Buffet – the Clairvaux Mutineers – are guillotined at La Santé Prison by chief executioner André Obrecht. Bontems, found not guilty of murder by the court, is condemned as Buffet's accomplice. President Pompidou, in private an abolitionist, upholds both death sentences in deference to public opinion.

== Sport ==
- 1 July – Tour de France begins.
- 22 July – Tour de France ends, won by Eddy Merckx of Belgium.

== Births ==
=== January to March ===
- 1 January – Lilian Thuram, international soccer player.
- 4 January – Sylvain Deplace, soccer player.
- 9 January – Frédéric Bessy, cyclist.
- 10 January – Gilles Trehin, artist and author.
- 17 January – Olivier Sourgens, rugby union player.
- 18 January – Bruno Alicarte, soccer player.
- 22 January – Yves Demaria, motocross racer.
- 23 January – Léa Drucker, French actress
- 8 February – Mathieu Verschuère, soccer player.
- 17 February – Philippe Candeloro, figure skater.
- 22 February – Laurence Leboucher, mountain bike and cyclo-cross racer.
- 3 March – Jacques Rémy, soccer player.
- 8 March – Nicolas Fargues, novelist.
- 12 March – Laurent Dufresne, soccer player.
- 22 March
  - Jocelyn Gourvennec, soccer player.
  - Christophe Revault, soccer player.
- 23 March – Judith Godrèche, actress and author.
- 24 March – Christophe Dugarry, soccer player.
- 25 March – Sébastien Flute, archer and Olympic gold medallist.
- 27 March – Agathe de La Fontaine, actress.
- 29 March – Cédric Lécluse, soccer player.

=== April to June ===
- 2 April – Fabrice Bry, volleyball player.
- 3 April – Sandrine Testud, tennis player.
- 21 April – Gwendal Peizerat, ice dancer.
- 29 April – Anne-Sophie Lapix, journalist and television presenter.
- April – Olivier Doleuze, jockey.
- 5 May – Laurent Capet, volleyball player.
- 6 May – Sébastien Amiez, alpine skier.
- 15 May – David Charvet, actor.
- 15 May – Élisa Martin, politician.
- 20 May – Christophe Dominici, international rugby union player (died 2020).
- 22 May – Nathalie Teppe, heptathlete.
- 28 May – Jocelyn Blanchard, soccer player.
- 8 June – Frédéric Esther, boxer.
- 17 June – Antoine Albeau, windsurfer.
- 19 June – Jean Dujardin, comedian.
- 23 June – Zinedine Zidane, international soccer player.
- 28 June – Samir Amirèche, soccer player.

=== July to September ===
- 5 July
  - David Benyamine, tennis, billiards and poker player.
  - Gilles Lellouche, actor
- 6 July
  - Fabrice Colin, author.
  - Laurent Gaudé, writer.
- 10 July – Stéphane Carnot, soccer player.
- 14 July – Loïc Le Meur, entrepreneur and blogger.
- 28 July – Walter Bénéteau, cyclist.
- 29 July – Amaria Pauline, dancer
- 5 August – Yann Lachuer, soccer player.
- 7 August – Ghislain Lemaire, judoka.
- 13 August – Michael Sinterniklaas, French-born American voice actor
- 19 August – Fabien Cool, soccer player.
- 20 August – Olivier Guégan, soccer player.
- 20 August – Jérôme Legavre, politician.
- 1 September – Vincent Riou, sailor.
- 13 September – Olivier Echouafni, soccer player.
- 19 September – Sébastien Maté, soccer player.
- 21 September – Olivia Bonamy, actress.

=== October to December ===
- 5 October – Jean-Sebastien Bax, soccer player.
- 15 October – Mathieu Demy, actor.
- 19 October – Fabien Leclercq, soccer player.
- 24 October – Frédéric Déhu, soccer player.
- 25 October – Esther Duflo, economist.
- 11 November – Stéphane Cassard, soccer player.
- 14 November – Delphine Lingemann, politician.
- 16 November – Patricia Meunier-Lebouc, golfer.
- 20 November
  - Jérôme Alonzo, soccer player.
  - Corinne Niogret, biathlete and Olympic medallist.
- 22 November – Olivier Brouzet, rugby union player.
- 27 November – Stéphane Pocrain, television journalist.
- 3 December – Laurent Roux, cyclist.
- 4 December – Franck Tournaire, international rugby union player.
- 5 December
  - Stéphane Barthe, racing cyclist
  - Antoine Préget, soccer player.
- 6 December – Cyrille Pouget, soccer player.
- 13 December – Claude-Arnaud Rivenet, soccer player.
- 19 December – Cédric Soulette, rugby union player.
- 22 December – Vanessa Paradis, singer and actress.
- 24 December – Richard Dutruel, soccer player.
- 26 December – Jérôme Le Banner, kickboxer and K-1 practitioner.
- 31 December – Grégory Coupet, international soccer player.

=== Full date unknown ===
- Jules de Balincourt, painter.
- Fabrice Bellard, computer programmer.
- Vanessa Duriès, novelist (died 1993).
- Sylvain Guillot, jockey.

== Deaths ==
=== January to March ===
- 1 January – Maurice Chevalier, actor and singer (born 1888).
- 6 January – Xavier Vallat, politician and Commissioner-General for Jewish Questions in Vichy France (born 1891).
- 19 January – Suzanne Malherbe, illustrator and designer (born 1892).
- 20 January – Jean Casadesus, classical pianist (born 1927).
- 29 January – Claire Ferchaud, religious mystic (born 1896)
- 17 February – Youenn Drezen, Breton nationalist writer and activist (born 1899).
- 21 February
  - Marie Dubas, music-hall singer and comedian (born 1894).
  - Eugène Tisserant, cardinal (born 1884).
- 4 March – Maurice Diot, cyclist (born 1922).
- 17 March – Adolphe Bousquet, rugby union player (born 1899).
- 28 March
  - Joseph Paul-Boncour, politician (born 1873).
  - Alice Pruvot-Fol, malacologist (born 1873).

=== April to June ===
- 10 April – Henri de la Falaise, translator, film director and film producer (born 1898).
- 11 April – Maurice Cottenet, soccer player (born 1895).
- 26 April – Jacques de Bernonville, collaborationist and senior police officer in the Vichy regime (born 1897).
- 27 April – Lucien Sarti, drug trafficker and killer-for-hire (b. c1931).
- 5 May – Roger Courtois, international soccer player (born 1912).
- 7 May
  - Henri Diamant-Berger, screenwriter, film director and producer (born 1895).
  - Robert Lingat, academic scholar (born 1892).
- 28 May – Violette Leduc, author (born 1907).
- 5 June – Jean Moreau, politician (born 1888).
- 17 June – Marcel Deviq, engineer, businessman, and politician (born 1907).
- 29 June – Boby Lapointe, singer (born 1922).
- 30 June – Hervé Budes de Guébriant, engineer (born 1880).

=== July to September ===
- 7 July – Marcel-Frédéric Lubin-Lebrère, rugby union player (born 1891).
- 22 July – Max Aub, author, playwright and literary critic (born 1903).
- 14 August – Jules Romains, poet and writer (born 1885).
- 16 August – Pierre Brasseur, actor (born 1905).
- 21 August
  - Albert Achard, World War I flying ace (born 1894).
  - Yvonne Gall, operatic soprano (born 1885).
- 24 August – Lucien Rebatet, author, journalist and intellectual (born 1903).
- 14 September – Jean-Jacques Bernard, playwright (born 1888)
- 19 September – Robert Casadesus, pianist and composer (born 1899).
- 21 September – Henry de Montherlant, essayist, novelist and playwright (born 1896).
- 28 September – Maurice Thiriet, composer (born 1906).

=== October to December ===
- 29 October – Julien Maitron, cyclist (born 1881).
- 18 November – André Héléna, writer (born 1919).
- 27 November – Robert Schurrer, athlete and Olympic medallist (born 1890).
- 13 December – René Mayer, politician and Prime Minister of France (born 1895).
- 15 December – François Bourbotte, soccer player (born 1913).

== See also ==
- List of French films of 1972
