= 1971 in France =

- Decades: 1950s; 1960s; 1970s; 1980s; 1990s
- See also: History of France; Timeline of French history; List of years in France

Events from the year 1971 in France.

== Incumbents ==
- President: Georges Pompidou
- Prime Minister: Jacques Chaban-Delmas

== Events ==
- 14 March – Municipal elections held.
- 21 March – Municipal elections held.
- 3 July – American singer Jim Morrison, lead singer of The Doors, dies from a heart attack in the bathtub of his Paris hotel room. He was 27 years old.
- 3 September – Four Power Agreement on Berlin is signed.
- 10 December – Renault unveils its new R5 model, a small three-door hatchback similar in concept to the recently launched Italian Fiat 127, which will go on sale in the new year.

== Births ==
=== January to March ===
- 4 January – Sébastien Foucras, freestyle skier and Olympic medallist
- 17 January – Sylvie Testud, actress, writer and director
- 20 January – Catherine Marsal, road racing cyclist
- 2 February
  - Ludovic Auger, cyclist
  - Stéphane Pédron, soccer player
- 5 February – Michel Breistroff, NHL ice hockey player (d. 1996)
- 7 February – Emmanuel Curtil, actor
- 11 February – Christian Labit, rugby union player
- 15 February – Brigitte Guibal, slalom canoer and Olympic medallist
- 21 February – Pierre Raschi, rugby union player
- 26 February – Hélène Ségara, singer
- 28 February – Tristan Louis, author and internet entrepreneur
- 20 March – Stéphane Heulot, cyclist
- 29 March – Alexandre Brasseur, actor.

=== April to June ===
- 3 April – Emmanuel Collard, motor racing driver.
- 7 April – Guillaume Depardieu, actor.
- 8 April – Christophe Lamaison, international rugby union player.
- 9 April – Jérôme Dreyfus, judoka.
- 12 April – Christophe Moreau, cyclist.
- 13 April – Franck Esposito, swimmer.
- 16 April – Jean-Michel Bazire, Harness racing driver.
- 27 April – François Bégaudeau, journalist, novelist and actor
- 4 May – Sébastien Denis, hurdler.
- 8 May – Dominique Casagrande, soccer player.
- 9 May – Nicolas Ghesquière, fashion designer.
- 11 May – Dominique Arribagé, soccer player.
- 15 May – Anthony Bancarel, soccer player.
- 24 May – Habib Sissoko, soccer player.
- 28 May
  - Isabelle Carré, actress.
  - Lilian Martin, soccer player.
- 5 June – Stéphane Clamens, sport shooter.
- 9 June – Jean Galfione, pole vaulter and Olympic gold medallist.
- 10 June – Bruno Ngotty, soccer player.
- 12 June
  - Félicia Ballanger, cyclist.
  - Jérôme Romain, athlete.
- 25 June – Sébastien Levicq, decathlete.
- 28 June
  - Fabien Barthez, international soccer player.
  - Guillaume de Fondaumière, video game designer.
  - Sébastien Gattuso, athlete.
- 29 June – Stéphan Bignet, triathlete.

=== July to September ===
- 21 July – Emmanuel Bangué, long jumper.
- 4 August – Christophe Mendy, boxer.
- 6 August – Stéphane Lecat, swimmer.
- 11 August – Djamel Bouras, judoka and Olympic gold medallist.
- 25 August – Louis-Karim Nébati, actor.
- 4 September – Lilian Laslandes, soccer player.
- 4 September – Isabelle Périgault, French politician
- 9 September – Francis Llacer, soccer player.
- 27 September – Cédric Penicaud, swimmer.
- 29 September – Lilian Nalis, soccer player.

=== October to December ===
- 1 October – Stéphane Breitwieser, art thief.
- 14 October – Frédéric Guesdon, cyclist.
- 26 October – Olivier Galzi, television journalist.
- 28 October
  - Jimmy Algerino, soccer player.
  - Nicolas Ouédec, soccer player.
- 9 November – Sabri Lamouchi, soccer player.
- 16 November – Laurent Wolf, music producer and DJ.
- 19 November
  - Pascal Edmond, golfer.
  - Cécile Lignot-Maubert, hammer thrower.
- 24 November
  - Franck Avitabile, jazz pianist.
  - Stéphane Denève, conductor.
- 29 November – Olivier Quint, soccer player.
- 8 December – Stéphane Poulat, triathlete.
- 17 December – Antoine Rigaudeau, basketball player.
- 21 December – Matthieu Chedid, singer-songwriter.
- 28 December – Olivier Enjolras, soccer player.

=== Full date unknown ===
- Sylvain Chauveau, musician and composer.
- Fabrice Hadjadj, writer and philosopher.
- Olivier Manchion, musician.

== Deaths ==
=== January to March ===
- 5 January – Émilienne Moreau-Evrard, hero of World War I and in French resistance during World War II (born 1898).
- 10 January – Coco Chanel, fashion designer (born 1883).
- 13 January – Henri Tomasi, composer and conductor (born 1901).
- 8 February – Louis Antoine, mathematician (born 1888).
- 26 February – Fernandel, actor (born 1903).
- 2 March – Rita Jolivet, actress (born 1884).
- 10 March – Jean Follain, author, poet and lawyer (born 1903).
- 31 March – Alfred Desenclos, composer (born 1912).

=== April to June ===
- 3 April – Jacques Ochs, artist, épée and foil fencer and Olympic gold medallist (born 1883).
- 11 April – Marcel Gromaire, painter (born 1892).
- 28 May – Jean Vilar, actor (born 1912).
- 30 May – Marcel Dupré, organist, pianist and composer (born 1886).
- 5 June – André Trocmé, pastor who aided Jewish refugees (born 1901).
- 12 June – Jules Dewaquez, soccer player (born 1899).
- 25 June – Charles Vildrac, playwright and poet (born 1882).

=== July to September ===
- 10 July – Laurent Dauthuille, boxer (born 1924).
- 19 July – Arsène Roux, Arabist and Berberologist (born 1893).
- 27 July – Jacques Lusseyran, author (born 1924).
- 31 July – Michel Saint-Denis, actor, theatre director, and drama theorist (born 1897).
- 24 August – René Paul Raymond Capuron, botanist (born 1921).
- 30 August – Louis Armand, engineer (born 1905).
- 10 September – Roland de Vaux, priest and archaeologist (born 1903).

=== October to December ===
- 10 October – Philippe Hériat, novelist, playwright and actor (born 1898).
- 27 October – Charlotte de La Trémoille, noblewoman (born 1892).
- 16 November – Lucien Chopard, entomologist (born 1885).
- 15 December – Paul Lévy, mathematician (born 1886).

=== Full date unknown ===
- Louis Lecoin, militant pacifist (born 1888).
- André Lesauvage, sailor and Olympic gold medallist (born 1890).
