= 1973 in France =

- Decades: 1950s; 1960s; 1970s; 1980s; 1990s
- See also: History of France; Timeline of French history; List of years in France

Events from the year 1973 in France.

== Incumbents ==
- President: Georges Pompidou
- Prime Minister: Pierre Messmer

== Events ==
- 4 March – Legislative Election held.
- 11 March – Legislative Election held.
- 3 June – A Tupolev Tu-144 supersonic aircraft crashes at the Paris air show; 14 are killed.
- 11 July – Varig Flight 820 Boeing 707 crashes near Orly Airport, Paris, resulting in 123 deaths, with 11 survivors.
- 20 July – France resumes nuclear bomb tests in Mururoa Atoll, over the protests of Australia and New Zealand.
- 23 September – Cantonales Elections held.
- 30 September – Cantonales Elections held.

== Births ==
=== January to March ===
- 11 January – Christophe Medaillon, soccer player
- 12 January – Olivier Peslier, jockey
- 15 January – Aurelie Dupont, ballet dancer
- 17 January – Johnny Hajjar, politician
- 19 January – Karen Lancaume, adult film star (died 2005)
- 26 January – Melvil Poupaud, actor
- 29 January – Fabien Foret, motorcycle racer
- 30 January – Olivier Marceau, triathlete
- 6 February – Élisabeth Grousselle, athlete
- 12 February – Thomas Dufour, curler
- 18 February – Claude Makélélé, international soccer player
- 22 February – Philippe Gaumont, cyclist
- 24 February – Antony Dupuis, tennis player
- 25 February
  - Hélène de Fougerolles, actress
  - Gérald Merceron, international rugby union player
- 28 February – Philippe Brunel, soccer player
- 3 March – Charles-Philippe, Duke of Anjou
- 13 March – Olivier Asmaker, cyclist
- 26 March – Sébastien Charpentier, motorcycle road racer

=== April to June ===
- 4 April – Samassi Abou, soccer player
- 5 April
  - Élodie Bouchez, actress
  - Vanessa Demouy, actress and model
  - Yacine Douma, judoka
- 6 April – Franck Marchis, astronomer and planetary scientist
- 7 April – Carole Montillet, alpine skier
- 10 April – Guillaume Canet, actor and film director
- 11 April – Olivier Magne, international rugby union player
- 12 April
  - Joël Lautier, chess grandmaster
  - Lionel Roux, tennis player
- 13 April – Nicolas Jalabert, cyclist
- 16 April – Jérôme Bonnissel, soccer player
- 19 April
  - David Chaussinand, hammer thrower
  - Patrice Estanguet, slalom canoer and Olympic medallist
- 26 April – Jules Naudet, filmmaker
- 1 May – Rebecca Hampton, actress and television presenter
- 8 May – Laurent Charvet, soccer player
- 13 May – Franck Dumoulin, pistol shooter and Olympic gold medallist
- 15 May – Pascal Gentil, taekwondo practitioner and Olympic medallist
- 17 May – Frédéric Havas, volleyball player
- 20 May – Christophe Laussucq, rugby union player
- 22 May – Yannick Bru, rugby union player
- 24 May – Eric Carrière, soccer player
- 12 June – Olivier Baudry, soccer player
- 14 June – Stéphanie Arricau, golfer
- 17 June – Louis Leterrier, film director
- 18 June – Julie Depardieu, actress
- 22 June – Cyril Saugrain, cyclist
- 27 June – Frédéric Roux, soccer player

=== July to September ===
- 19 July – Saïd Taghmaoui, actor and screenwriter
- 31 July – Alexandre Bonnot, soccer player
- 4 August – Xavier Marchand, swimmer
- 5 August – Laurent Redon, motor racing driver
- 7 August – Florent Laville, soccer player
- 18 August – Jerome Lagarrigue, painter and illustrator
- 25 August – Bernard Inom, boxer
- 26 August – Laurent Huard, soccer coach
- 29 August – Olivier Jacque, motorcycle road racer
- 30 August – Sophie Dodemont, archer and Olympic medallist
- 9 September – Jérôme Golmard, tennis player
- 18 September – Laurent Foirest, basketball player
- 19 September
  - Frédéric Kakon, guitarist
  - Stéphane Porato, soccer player
- 25 September – Jean-Yves de Blasiis, soccer player
- 27 September – Arnaud Lebrun, soccer player
- 30 September – Sébastien Dallet, soccer player

=== October to December ===
- 5 October – Cédric Villani, mathematician and politician
- 6 October – Cyrille Diabate, mixed martial artist
- 10 October – Joël Chenal, alpine skier
- 13 October – Guillaume Florent, sailor, Olympic medallist
- 15 October – Jean-Louis Valois, soccer player
- 24 October
  - Vincent Candela, international soccer player
  - Yannick Quesnel, soccer player
- 29 October – Robert Pires, international soccer player
- 3 November – Patrick Moreau, soccer player
- 8 November – Frédéric Brando, soccer player
- 12 November – Stéphane Glas, rugby union player
- 13 November – David Auradou, rugby union player
- 16 November – Mathieu Bozzetto, snowboarder
- 23 November
  - Marie Collonvillé, heptathlete
  - Grégory Malicki, soccer player
- 24 November – Sébastien Pérez, soccer player
- 7 December – Fabien Pelous, international rugby union player
- 14 December – Jean-Paul Mendy, boxer
- 15 December – Surya Bonaly, figure skater
- 24 December – Frédéric Demontfaucon, judoka
- 29 December – Christophe Rinero, cyclist

=== Full date unknown ===
- Chloé Delaume, novelist, performer and musician
- Gaël Duval, software designer
- David Grimal, violinist

== Deaths ==
=== January to June ===
- 15 February – Achille Liénart, cardinal (born 1884)
- 1 March – Henri Meslot, athlete (born 1884)
- 2 March – Jules Ladoumègue, athlete and Olympic medallist (born 1906)
- 4 March – Marie-Anne Desmarest, novelist (born 1904)
- 18 March – Roland Dorgelès, novelist (born 1885)
- 30 March – Yves Giraud-Cabantous, motor racing driver (born 1904)
- 2 April – Joseph-Charles Lefèbvre, cardinal (born 1892)
- 10 April – Robert Collard, animator, and cartoonist (born 1884)
- 25 April – Armand Annet, colonial governor (born 1888)
- 28 April – Jacques Maritain, Catholic philosopher (born 1882)
- 18 May – Dieudonne Costes, aviator (born 1892)
- 3 June – Jean Batmale, soccer player (born 1895)
- 4 June – Maurice René Fréchet, mathematician (born 1878)
- 18 June – Georges Bonnet, politician (born 1889)

=== July to December ===
- 29 July – Henri Charrière, convicted felon and author (born 1906)
- 2 August – Jean-Pierre Melville, filmmaker (born 1917)
- 17 August – Jean Barraqué, composer (born 1928)
- 18 August – François Bonlieu, Alpine skier and Olympic gold medallist (born 1937)
- 30 August – Robert Défossé, soccer player (born 1909)
- 14 September – Roger Bourdin, baritone (born 1900)
- 6 October – François Cevert, motor racing driver (born 1944)
- 8 October – Gabriel Marcel, philosopher (born 1889)
- 23 October – Maurice Princet, mathematician and actuary (born 1875)
- 6 November – Noël Roquevert, actor (born 1892)
- 1 December – Albert Dupouy, rugby union player (born 1901)
- 25 December – Gabriel Voisin, aviation pioneer (born 1880)
- 30 December
  - Marcel-Bruno Gensoul, admiral (born 1880)
  - Henri Büsser, composer and conductor (born 1872)
