= Dallet (surname) =

Dallet is a surname. Notable people with this surname include:

- Claude-Charles Dallet (1829–1878), French missionary
- Jean-Marie Dallet (1909–1972), linguist
- Joe Dallet (1907–1937), American industrial worker
- Rebecca Dallet (born 1969), American lawyer
- Sébastien Dallet (born 1973), French association football player
