= 1999–2000 Olympique Lyonnais season =

Lyon
1999–2000 season
- Owner: OL Groupe
- President: Jean-Michel Aulas
- Head coach: Bernard Lacombe
- Stadium: Stade de Gerland
- Division 1: 3rd
- Coupe de France: Quarter-finals
- Coupe de la Ligue: Quarter-finals
- UEFA Champions League: Third qualifying round
- UEFA Cup: Third round
- Top goalscorer: League: Sonny Anderson (23); All: Sonny Anderson (28)
- Average home league attendance: 35,454
Home colours	Away colours

The 1999–2000 season was the 101st season in the existence of Olympique Lyonnais and the club's 11th consecutive season in the top flight of French football. They participated in the Ligue 1, the Coupe de France, the Coupe de la Ligue, the UEFA Champions League and the UEFA Cup.

== First-team squad ==
Squad at end of season

Note: Flags indicate national team as defined under FIFA eligibility rules; some limited exceptions apply. Players may hold more than one non-FIFA nationality.

No.	Pos.	Nation	Player
1	GK	FRA	Grégory Coupet
3	DF	FRA	Patrice Carteron
4	DF	FRA	Florent Laville
5	DF	POL	Jacek Bąk
6	MF	FRA	Philippe Violeau
7	FW	FRA	Sidney Govou
8	MF	FRA	Pierre Laigle
9	FW	BRA	Sonny Anderson
10	MF	FRA	Vikash Dhorasoo
11	FW	FRA	Tony Vairelles
12	DF	FRA	Serge Blanc

No.	Pos.	Nation	Player
13	DF	FRA	Hubert Fournier
15	DF	FRA	Christophe Delmotte
17	DF	FRA	Jérémie Bréchet
19	MF	FRA	Steed Malbranque
22	MF	FRA	David Linarès
23	GK	FRA	Sébastien Socié
24	DF	FRA	Cédric Uras
27	MF	FRA	Patrice Ouerdi
29	FW	FRA	Roland Vieira
30	GK	FRA	Angelo Hugues
33	MF	FRA	Florent Balmont

=== Left club during season ===
Note: Flags indicate national team as defined under FIFA eligibility rules; some limited exceptions apply. Players may hold more than one non-FIFA nationality.

No.	Pos.	Nation	Player
2	DF	FRA	Jean-Christophe Devaux (to Servette)
14	FW	FRA	Alain Caveglia (to Nantes)
20	FW	MLI	Frédéric Kanouté (to West Ham United)
25	MF	FRA	David Hellebuyck (to Guingamp)

== Competitions ==
=== Overall record ===
Competition	First match	Last match	Starting round	Final position	Record							
Competition	First match	Last match	Starting round	Final position	Pld	W	D	L	GF	GA	GD	Win %
Division 1	31 July 1999	13 May 2000	Matchday 1	3rd	34	16	8	10	45	42	+3	47.06
Coupe de France	22 January 2000	19 March 2000	Round of 64	Quarter-finals	4	3	0	1	4	4	+0	75.00
Coupe de la Ligue	8 January 2000	19 February 2000	Round of 32	Quarter-finals	3	2	0	1	4	2	+2	66.67
UEFA Champions League	10 August 1999	25 August 1999	Third qualifying round	Third qualifying round	2	0	0	2	0	3	−3	0.00
UEFA Cup	15 September 1999	7 December 1999	First round	Third round	6	5	0	1	11	5	+6	83.33
Total					49	26	8	15	64	56	+8	53.06

Last updated: 22 August 2024
Source: BDFutbol

=== Division 1 ===
==== League table ====
Pos	Team	Pld	W	D	L	GF	GA	GD	Pts	Qualification or relegation
1	Monaco (C)	34	20	5	9	69	38	+31	65	Qualification to Champions League first group stage
2	Paris Saint-Germain	34	16	10	8	54	40	+14	58	Qualification to Champions League first group stage
3	Lyon	34	16	8	10	45	42	+3	56	Qualification to Champions League third qualifying round
4	Bordeaux	34	15	9	10	52	40	+12	54	Qualification to UEFA Cup first round
5	Lens	34	14	7	13	42	41	+1	49	Qualification to Intertoto Cup third round

Source: Ligue 1
Rules for classification: 1) points; 2) goal difference; 3) number of goals scored.
(C) Champions

==== Results summary ====
Overall								Home						Away					
Pld	W	D	L	GF	GA	GD	Pts	W	D	L	GF	GA	GD	W	D	L	GF	GA	GD
34	16	8	10	45	42	+3	56	10	5	2	24	11	+13	6	3	8	21	31	−10

Last updated: 13 May 2000.
Source: BDFutbol

==== Results by round ====
Round	1	2	3	4	5	6	7	8	9	10	11	12	13	14	15	16	17	18	19	20	21	22	23	24	25	26	27	28	29	30	31	32	33	34
Ground	H	A	H	A	H	H	A	H	A	H	A	H	A	H	A	H	A	H	A	H	A	A	H	A	H	A	H	A	H	A	H	A	H	A
Result	L	W	D	W	W	D	W	D	L	W	W	W	L	W	D	W	L	L	W	W	D	L	D	L	W	L	W	L	W	W	D	L	W	D
Position	3	13	8	10	4	3	2	2	1	5	2	2	1	3	2	2	2	2	3	3	2	2	4	4	4	4	4	2	2	2	2	2	4	3

Source: BDFutbol
A = Away; H = Home; W = Win; D = Draw; L = Loss

==== Matches ====
31 July 1999 1	Lyon	1–2	Montpellier	Lyon
20:00 CEST (UTC+2)	Vairelles 79'		Loko 24'; Barbosa 73'	Stadium: Stade de Gerland; Attendance: 38,443; Referee: Gilles Veissière

5 August 1999 2	Troyes	1–2	Lyon	Troyes
19:00 CEST (UTC+2)	Jezierski 82'		Vairelles 15', 52'	Stadium: Stade de l'Aube; Attendance: 13,043; Referee: Stéphane Moulin

15 August 1999 3	Lyon	2–2	Rennes	Lyon
19:00 CEST (UTC+2)	Anderson 31'; Carteron 89'		Bassila 45'; Nonda 74'	Stadium: Stade de Gerland; Attendance: 33,509; Referee: Pascal Garibian

20 August 1999 4	Metz	0–1	Lyon	Metz
20:00 CEST (UTC+2)			Caveglia 90'	Stadium: Stade Saint-Symphorien; Attendance: 22,030; Referee: Jean-Claude Puyalt

29 August 1999 5	Lyon	1–0	Paris Saint-Germain	Lyon
20:45 CEST (UTC+2)	Anderson 51' (pen.)			Stadium: Stade de Gerland; Attendance: 38,541; Referee: Damien Ledentu

11 September 1999 6	Lyon	0–0	Auxerre	Lyon
20:00 CEST (UTC+2)				Stadium: Stade de Gerland; Attendance: 36,706; Referee: Laurent Duhamel

18 September 1999 7	Bordeaux	1–3	Lyon	Bordeaux
20:45 CEST (UTC+2)	Wiltord 81'		Carteron 7'; Anderson 9', 67'	Stadium: Stade du Parc Lescure; Attendance: 29,162; Referee: Bruno Coué

25 September 1999 8	Lyon	0–0	Strasbourg	Lyon
20:00 CEST (UTC+2)				Stadium: Stade de Gerland; Attendance: 31,159; Referee: Claude Colombo

3 October 1999 9	Monaco	1–0	Lyon	Monaco
18:45 CEST (UTC+2)	Gallardo 5'			Stadium: Stade Louis II; Attendance: 13,086; Referee: Pascal Garibian

12 October 1999 10	Lyon	2–0	Nantes	Lyon
18:45 CEST (UTC+2)	Anderson 50', 90'			Stadium: Stade de Gerland; Attendance: 35,729; Referee: Bertrand Layec

15 October 1999 11	Marseille	0–1	Lyon	Marseille
20:45 CEST (UTC+2)			Anderson 36'	Stadium: Stade Vélodrome; Attendance: 52,892; Referee: Jean-Claude Puyalt

24 October 1999 12	Lyon	2–1	Nancy	Lyon
19:00 CEST (UTC+2)	Anderson 32'; Blanc 59'		Rodrigues 20'	Stadium: Stade de Gerland; Attendance: 30,679; Referee: Stéphane Moulin

29 October 1999 13	Sedan	2–0	Lyon	Sedan
18:45 CEST (UTC+2)	N'Diefi 21'; Deblock 90'			Stadium: Stade Émile Albeau; Attendance: 13,319; Referee: Philippe Kalt

7 November 1999 14	Lyon	3–0	Le Havre	Lyon
17:00 CET (UTC+2)	Delmotte 35'; Anderson 63', 83'			Stadium: Stade de Gerland; Attendance: 35,811; Referee: Alain Hamer

10 November 1999 15	Saint-Étienne	1–1	Lyon	Saint-Étienne
21:00 CET (UTC+2)	Pédron 8'		Anderson 7'	Stadium: Stade Geoffroy-Guichard; Attendance: 35,095; Referee: Gilles Veissière

20 November 1999 16	Lyon	1–0	Lens	Lyon
19:00 CET (UTC+2)	Anderson 78' (pen.)			Stadium: Stade de Gerland; Attendance: 30,544; Referee: Hervé Piccirillo

28 November 1999 17	Bastia	3–0	Lyon	Furiani
20:45 CET (UTC+1)	Lachuer 20'; Née 77', 85'			Stadium: Stade Armand Cesari; Attendance: 7,447; Referee: Stéphane Bré

3 December 1999 18	Lyon	1–3	Troyes	Lyon
20:00 CET (UTC+2)	Delmotte 37'		Boutal 20'; Đukić 70', 80'	Stadium: Stade de Gerland; Attendance: 34,951; Referee: Patrick Lhermite

11 December 1999 19	Rennes	1–2	Lyon	Rennes
20:00 CET (UTC+1)	Bardon 24'		Malbranque 18'; Anderson 78'	Stadium: Stade de la Route de Lorient; Attendance: 13,433; Referee: Bruno Coué

18 December 1999 20	Lyon	2–0	Metz	Lyon
20:00 CET (UTC+2)	Malbranque 58'; Anderson 81'			Stadium: Stade de Gerland; Attendance: 27,917; Referee: Stéphane Bré

11 January 2000 21	Paris Saint-Germain	2–2	Lyon	Paris
20:45 CET (UTC+1)	Christian 15'; Robert 60'		Anderson 81'; Vairelles 88'	Stadium: Parc des Princes; Attendance: 43,807; Referee: Laurent Duhamel

15 January 2000 22	Auxerre	2–0	Lyon	Auxerre
20:00 CET (UTC+1)	Kapo 23'; Marlet 67'			Stadium: Stade de l'Abbé Deschamps; Attendance: 9,627; Referee: Jean-Claude Puyalt

26 January 2000 23	Lyon	1–1	Bordeaux	Lyon
20:00 CET (UTC+1)	Bąk 5'		Laslandes 17'	Stadium: Stade de Gerland; Attendance: 31,492; Referee: Bruno Coué

2 February 2000 24	Strasbourg	4–2	Lyon	Strasbourg
20:00 CET (UTC+1)	Luyindula 33', 68', 75'; Laville 47' (o.g.)		Anderson 79'; Kanouté 80'	Stadium: Stade de la Meinau; Attendance: 14.840; Referee: Patrick Lhermite

6 February 2000 25	Lyon	2–1	Monaco	Lyon
20:45 CET (UTC+1)	Anderson 5'; Sagnol 21' (o.g.)		Trezeguet 38'	Stadium: Stade de Gerland; Attendance: 38,478; Referee: Stéphane Bré

15 February 2000 26	Nantes	6–1	Lyon	Nantes
18:45 CET (UTC+1)	Da Rocha 6'; Sibierski 8', 10'; Devineau 42', 51'; Chanelet 88'		Vairelles 35'	Stadium: Stade de la Beaujoire; Attendance: 28,142; Referee: Philippe Kalt

26 February 2000 27	Lyon	2–0	Marseille	Lyon
21:00 CET (UTC+2)	Vairelles 28'; Anderson 53'			Stadium: Stade de Gerland; Attendance: 39,758; Referee: Alain Sars

12 March 2000 28	Nancy	1–0	Lyon	Tomblaine
18:45 CET (UTC+2)	Zé Alcino 69'			Stadium: Stade Marcel Picot; Attendance: 11,167; Referee: Jean-Claude Puyalt

26 March 2000 29	Lyon	2–0	Sedan	Lyon
18:45 CEST (UTC+2)	Malbranque 49'; Anderson 90'			Stadium: Stade de Gerland; Attendance: 40,080; Referee: Claude Colombo

8 April 2000 30	Le Havre	0–1	Lyon	Le Havre
20:00 CEST (UTC+2)			Anderson 24'	Stadium: Stade Jules Deschaseaux; Attendance: 15,161; Referee: Stéphane Moulin

14 April 2000 31	Lyon	0–0	Saint-Étienne	Lyon
20:45 CEST (UTC+2)				Stadium: Stade de Gerland; Attendance: 39,218; Referee: Alain Sars

29 April 2000 32	Lens	4–3	Lyon	Lens
20:00 CEST (UTC+2)	Delmotte 19' (o.g.); Nouma 23'; Sakho 62', 68'		Anderson 9', 26' (pen.); Blanc 90+2'	Stadium: Stade Félix-Bollaert; Attendance: 40,571; Referee: Stéphane Bré

4 May 2000 33	Lyon	2–1	Bastia	Lyon
20:00 CEST (UTC+2)	Violeau 45'; Laigle 48'		Née 17'	Stadium: Stade de Gerland; Attendance: 39,812; Referee: Pascal Garibian

13 May 2000 34	Montpellier	2–2	Lyon	Montpellier
20:00 CEST (UTC+2)	Silvestre 23'; Maoulida 84'		Laigle 29'; Anderson 45'	Stadium: Stade de la Mosson; Attendance: 15,351; Referee: Jean-Claude Puyalt

=== Coupe de France ===
22 January 2000 Round of 64	Tours	0–1 (a.e.t.)	Lyon	Tours
20:00 CET (UTC+1)			Malbranque 119'	Stadium: Stade de la Vallée du Cher; Attendance: 14,000; Referee: Pascal Viléo

12 February 2000 Round of 32	Lyon	1–0	Troyes	Lyon
17:00 CET (UTC+1)	Vairelles 21'			Stadium: Stade de Gerland; Attendance: 7,835; Referee: Bruno Derrien

4 March 2000 Round of 16	Red Star	1–2	Lyon	Saint-Denis
20:00 CET (UTC+1)	Doukantié 47'		Govou 81', 82'	Stadium: Stade Marville; Attendance: 5,000; Referee: Bruno Ruffray

19 March 2000 Quarter-finals	Lyon	1–3	Monaco	Lyon
17:00 CET (UTC+1)	Laigle 35'		Pršo 59'; Simone 79'; Giuly 90'	Stadium: Stade de Gerland; Attendance: 24,788; Referee: Bruno Derrien

=== Coupe de la Ligue ===
8 January 2000 Round of 32	Lyon	3–1	Amiens	Lyon
18:00 CET (UTC+1)	Anderson 17', 56'; Vairelles 61'		Rivenet 86'	Stadium: Stade de Gerland; Attendance: 24,290; Referee: Jacky Legrain

29 January 2000 Round of 16	Lyon	1–0	Bordeaux	Lyon
20:45 CET (UTC+1)	Vairelles 32'			Stadium: Stade de Gerland; Attendance: 18,461; Referee: Pascal Garibian

19 February 2000 Quarter-finals	Lyon	0–1 (a.e.t.)	Bastia	Lyon
20:45 CET (UTC+1)			Née 101'	Stadium: Stade de Gerland; Attendance: 28,196; Referee: Laurent Duhamel

=== UEFA Champions League ===
==== Third qualifying round ====
10 August 1999 First leg	Lyon (France)	0–1	(Slovenia) Maribor	Lyon, France
20:30 CEST (UTC+2)		Report	Filipović 88'	Stadium: Stade de Gerland; Attendance: 25,365; Referee: Sergei Khusainov (Russia)

25 August 1999 Second leg	Maribor (Slovenia)	2–0 (3–0 agg.)	(France) Lyon	Maribor, Slovenia
20:30 CEST (UTC+2)	Šimundža 23'; Balajić 45'	Report		Stadium: Ljudski vrt Attendance: 7,021; Referee: Oğuz Sarvan (Turkey)

=== UEFA Cup ===
==== First round ====
15 September 1999 First leg	HJK Helsinki (Finland)	0–1	(France) Lyon	Helsinki, Finland
18:00		Report	Vairelles 16'	Stadium: Helsinki Olympic Stadium; Attendance: 8,103; Referee: Michal Beneš (Czech Republic)

30 September 1999 Second leg	Lyon (France)	5–1 (6–1 agg.)	(Finland) HJK Helsinki	Lyon, France
20:45	Anderson 11'; Blanc 15'; Linarès 18'; Vairelles 70', 86'	Report	Lehkosuo 40'	Stadium: Stade de Gerland; Attendance: 15,016; Referee: Edo Trivković (Croatia)

==== Second round ====
21 October 1999 First leg	Lyon (France)	1–0	(Scotland) Celtic	Lyon, France
20:45	Blanc 63'	Report		Stadium: Stade de Gerland; Attendance: 28,539; Referee: René Temmink (Netherlands)

4 November 1999 Second leg	Celtic (Scotland)	0–1 (0–2 agg.)	(France) Lyon	Glasgow, Scotland
20:45		Report	Vairelles 17'	Stadium: Celtic Park; Attendance: 54,291; Referee: Georg Dardenne (Germany)

==== Third round ====
25 November 1999 First leg	Lyon (France)	3–0	(Germany) Werder Bremen	Lyon, France
19:45	Anderson 13', 45'; Vairelles 77'	Report		Stadium: Stade de Gerland; Attendance: 20,899; Referee: Domenico Messina (Italy)

7 December 1999 Second leg	Werder Bremen (Germany)	4–0 (4–3 agg.)	(France) Lyon	Bremen, Germany
18:00	Bode 15'; Herzog 38' (pen.); Baumann 56'; Pizarro 77'	Report		Stadium: Weserstadion; Attendance: 9,559; Referee: Atanas Uzunov (Bulgaria)
