= Ibn Tunart =

- Born: 1085; Qal'at Bani Hammad
- Died: 1172; Fez
- Occupations: scholar, linguist

Ibn Tunart or Ibn Tunirt, whose full name was Abu Abdullah Muhammad ibn Ja'far al-Qaysi, was born in 1085 in the Qal'at Bani Ḥammad. He studied in Béjaïa then in Cordoba. He later became a teacher and judge in Fez. He died in the same city in 1172.

== Works ==
Ibn Tunart wrote an Arabic-Tamazight dictionary known as Kitāb al-asmā’ (the book of names). The dictionary is thematic, arranging its entries according to their meaning and grouping them into 38 sections based on shared semantic fields. Only nine copies of the work are known to exist. Two of them are nearly identical; some are preserved in Arsène Roux’s collection in Aix-en-Provence and in the Leiden University Library, while the rest remain in private collections in the Tashelhiyt-speaking regions of Morocco. The oldest and most complete copy is dated 956 H./1549 (under the shelfmark ms. Or 23.333 in Leiden University Library) and it contains approximately 2,500 terms.

The observation is that the lexicon of the manuscript belongs mainly to Tashelhiyt, spoken in the southwest of Morocco. However, we find terms belonging to other varieties and sometimes specific to a particular area or even restricted to particular dialects:

- tagsturt, agstur = sabre: to our knowledge, currently attested only in Chaoui of the Aurès, in Algeria (according to Naït-Zerrad 2002: 907); (Note: Agstur, meaning "sabre", is attested in modern Tashelhiyt (cf. Bounfour A. & Boumalek A., 2001, p. 13).)
- aflɣad = bald on the front of the head: attested only in part of Kabylia (according to Naït-Zerrad 2002: 569).
- taflst = faith, trust: attested only in Tuareg (Naït-Zerrad 2002: 570).
- aḍkkud = judgment: attested only in Tuareg (Naït-Zerrad 2002: 462).
- agmat-mddakkʷl = best friend: only attested in Zenaga.

There are also words that distinguish Tashelhiyt from other Tamazight languages:

- tarragt, tarraɣt = gift.
- iḍaggʷn = winds. (Note: This word has an external plural in most other Berber languages: aḍuten (Northern Berber) ~ aḍutăn (Tuareg) (cf. Haddadou 2007: n° 854).)
- dari = I have. (Note: Ɣur ~ ɣar ~ ɣir is used in most other Berber languages (cf. Haddadou 2007: n° 641).)
- afulki = beauty.
- agusmu = indigestion.
- aɣgʷmmi = doorway.
- tifiyya = meat. (Note: Aksum is used in most other Berber languages (cf. Haddadou 2007: n° 397).)
- tigmmi = house.
- iɣarasn = roads. (Note: Abrid is used in most other Berber languages (cf. Naït-Zerrad 1998: 100).)

The manuscript contains terms that no longer seem to be alive in current dialects such as asarn (Note: Iser (singular), meaning "prophet" was recorded by (Motylinski, 1898, p. 130) in modern Nafusi. "Roi grand. O dieu, o prophète, ai ajellid amok'ran aᵢ iser".) = prophets; imrran = husbands (according to Naït-Zerrad 2003: 40).

Boogert (2000) confirms that Ibn Tunart's Kitab al-Asma’ records a variety of Berber most closely related to modern Tashelhiyt based on comparison of lexicon and mophology, and proposes "Old Tashelhit" (Note: The terms "Medieval Tashelhiyt" in English and "Chleuh médiéval" in French are also used in academic sources (cf. Kossmann, 1999a; Elmedlaoui, 2012).) as an appropriate designation for it. Ibn Tunart's dictionary was also compiled in 1145, either before the conquest of its region by the Almohads, which makes it more likely that this dictionary was recovered and altered by Chleuh speakers in more recent times, given the four available copies of this text, which are several centuries later than the original work.
