= Khalid Chalqi =

Moroccan footballer (born 1971)

Personal information
- Full name: Khalid Chalqi
- Date of birth: 28 April 1971 (age 55)
- Place of birth: Oujda, Morocco
- Height: 6 ft 1 in (1.85 m)
- Position: Midfielder

Senior career*
Years	Team	Apps	(Gls)
- Aubervillers
- Olympique Noisy-le-Sec
- Vincennes
1998	Le Havre		
1998–1999	União Madeira	6	(1)
1999–2000	Naval	10	(0)
2000	Créteil		
2000–2001	Torquay United	21	(1)
- * Club domestic league appearances and goals

Khalid Chalqi (born 28 April 1971) is a Moroccan former professional footballer who played as a midfielder.

Chalqi was born in Oujda, Morocco and played for Aubervillers, Olympique Noisy-le-Sec, Vincennes and Le Havre before joining Portuguese First Division side União Madeira.

He then moved on to Naval and French Second Division side Créteil, but lost his place when the club's new owner made money available for new players. He joined Torquay United on trial in October 2000 and impressed manager Wes Saunders sufficiently to be rewarded with a contract on 10 November, becoming the third French player at Plainmoor, the others being Jules Mendy and Habib Sissoko.

He made his league debut the following day, scoring in a 3–2 away defeat against York City. Although struggling to adapt to the pace of the English game, he made up for it with his tough tackling and workrate. However, his combative style got him into disciplinary trouble. He was sent off for throwing a punch in the game against Cardiff City in December 2000 and could have almost cost the Gulls their league status when he was sent off at Plymouth Argyle in a vital game towards the end of the 2000–01 season, and was suspended for the final game against Barnet, which Torquay won to stay up at Barnet's expense.

New Torquay manager Roy McFarland decided towards the end of July 2001 that both Chalqi and Mendy could leave Plainmoor, and Chalqi left after settling his contract in early August. He was soon linked with a move to Hull City, but on 23 August was due to begin a trial with Plymouth Argyle by playing in a reserve game at Yeovil Town. However, after a communication problem, Chalqi going to Plymouth when the match was in Yeovil, he finally began his trial with Argyle a week later. His trial was not successful.
