= Juvisy-sur-Orge =

Commune in Île-de-France, France

- Commune
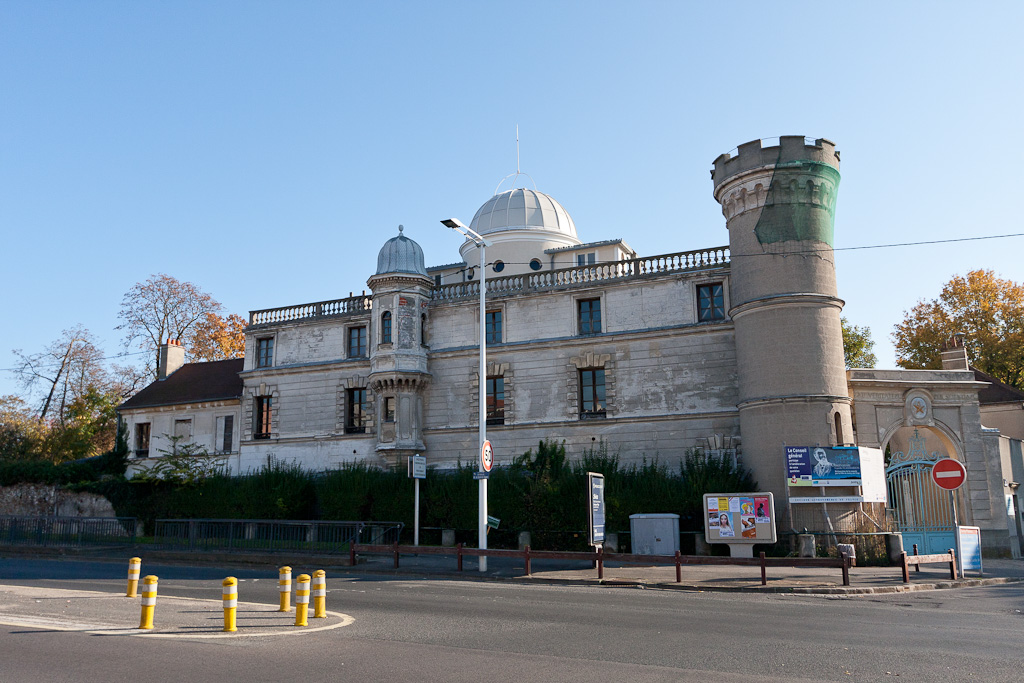
- The Camille Flammarion Observatory in Juvisy-sur-Orge

- Coat of arms
- Location of Juvisy-sur-Orge
- Location within France Location within Île-de-France (region)
- Coordinates: 48°41′20″N 2°22′42″E
- Country: France
- Region: Île-de-France
- Department: Essonne
- Arrondissement: Palaiseau
- Canton: Athis-Mons
- Intercommunality: Grand Paris

Government
  - Mayor (2020–2026): Lamia Bensarsa Reda
- Area^{1}: 2.24 km^{2} (0.86 sq mi)
- Elevation: 36 m (118 ft)
- Highest elevation: 92 m (302 ft)
- Lowest elevation: 32 m (105 ft)
- Population (2023): 19,292
  - Density: 8,610/km^{2} (22,300/sq mi)
- Demonym: French: Juvisien(ne)
- Time zone: UTC+01:00 (CET)
  - Summer (DST): UTC+02:00 (CEST)
- INSEE/Postal code: 91326 /91260
- Website: juvisy.fr
- ^{1} French Land Register data, which excludes lakes, ponds, glaciers > 1 km^{2} (0.386 sq mi or 247 acres) and river estuaries.

Juvisy-sur-Orge (French pronunciation: [ʒyvizi syʁ ɔʁʒ]; lit. 'Juvisy-on-Orge') or simply Juvisy is a commune in the Essonne department in Île-de-France, France. It is on the left bank of the Seine, 18 kilometres (11 mi) southeast of Paris and a few kilometres south of Orly Airport. The city is known for Juvisy station, one of the busiest railway stations nationally.

== Geography ==
Juvisy-sur-Orge is located 18 kilometres (11 mi) south of Paris, in the Grand Paris (Greater Paris), and is 10 kilometres (6.2 mi) north of Évry. Neighboring communes are:

- Athis-Mons
- Draveil
- Savigny-sur-Orge
- Viry-Châtillon

== Transportation ==
Motorists can reach Juvisy-sur-Orge via National Road N°.7 (Route nationale 7). Rail service to the city is by Juvisy station (Gare de Juvisy) on Paris RER (Réseau express régional, i.e., Regional Express Network) lines C and D.

== Toponymy ==
One theory of the origin of the name Juvisy is that it derives from the Latin Jovisiacum, meaning the 'estate of Jovisius', a Gallo-Roman personal name.

Another origin derives Juvisy from Métiosédum, its name as recorded in Commentarii de Bello Gallico. Some scholars believe Métiosédum evolved into Met-josédum, Josédum, and then Jésédis. Medieval documents record Juvisy as Givisi, Gevesi, Gévisium, and Justvisy.

== History ==
People have occupied the site of Juvisy-sur-Orge since ancient times; Julius Caesar notes it in Commentarii de Bello Gallico, his book about the Gallic Wars (58–50 BC) published between 58 and 49 BC. Centuries later, it became an important place under the French monarchy, as a royal hotel. It also served as a post relay, the first one on the road to Fontainebleau. In 1740 a pyramid was erected in Juvisy-sur-Orge to memorialize the work of Jean Picard (1620–1682) and Nicolas Louis de Lacaille (1713–1762) in measuring the Earth's circumference.

Juvisy-sur-Orge's railway station, Juvisy station, was built in 1840, and the city became a major road and railway junction in the 1840s. In 1883, the city became the location of astronomer Camille Flammarion's observatory, which today belongs to the Société astronomique de France. In 1893, Juvisy-sur-Orge became the first city in the Paris region with a bridge crossing the river Seine.

In May 1909 a venue for aviation races and exhibitions, Port-Aviation, opened to the public in neighboring Viry-Châtillon as the world's first purpose-built aerodrome. Although the airfield did not lie in Juvisy-sur-Orge, most of the general public attending events at Port-Aviation arrived from Paris by rail at Juvisy station, just under a kilometre (0.6 mile) from the airfield in Juvisy-sur-Orge; moreover, the railway station had a sign directing visitors to "Juvisy Airfield." This led the press and post card publishers habitually to refer to Port-Aviation by the misnomer "Juvisy Airfield" and to aviation events there as taking place in "Juvisy" or "Juvisy-sur-Orge." The misnomer "Juvisy Airfield" and the inaccurate association of Juvisy-sur-Orge with the location of Port-Aviation have persisted ever since.

Most of Juvisy-sur-Orge was destroyed in April 1944 by an Allied bombing raid during World War II, which targeted the city because it was the only one in the vicinity of Paris with such a large railway station and had railway lines going to most of France's major cities. It was rebuilt between 1945 and the 1970s.

Juvisy-sur-Orge is the burial site of author Raymond Queneau (1903–1976), who also is memorialized in the name of the city's Bibliothèque-Médiathèque Raymond Queneau.

== Population ==
Historical population
Year	Pop.	±% p.a.
1968	12,628	—
1975	13,671	+1.14%
1982	12,305	−1.49%
1990	11,818	−0.50%
1999	11,937	+0.11%
2007	14,153	+2.15%
2012	15,188	+1.42%
2017	16,667	+1.88%
2023	19,292	+2.47%
Source: INSEE

== Notable people ==
- Jean-Jacques Annaud (b. 1943), film director, producer, and screenwriter
- Emmanuelle Charpentier (b. 1968), professor, microbiologist, biochemist, and geneticist, 2020 Nobel laureate in Chemistry for the development of a method for genome editing through CRISPR
- Christophe (1945–2020), singer
- Amedy Coulibaly (1982–2015), one of three perpetrators in the January 2015 Île-de-France attacks
- Ouparine Djoco (b. 1998), footballer
- Ladji Doucouré (b. 1983), track and field athlete
- Camille Flammarion (1842–1925), astronomer
- Gabrielle Renaudot Flammarion (1877–1962), astronomer
- Alexandre Prémat (b. 1982), motor racing driver
- Ferdinand Quénisset (1872–1951), astronomer
- Sophian Rafai (b. 1986), basketball player
- Habib Sissoko (b. 1971), footballer

== See also ==
- Communes of the Essonne department
- 1909 European Rowing Championships
