= Serge Blanc =

Serge Blanc may refer to:

- Serge Blanc (footballer) (born 1972), French footballer
- Serge Blanc (violinist) (1929–2013), French classical violinist

== See also ==
- Serge Blanco (born 1958), French rugby union player
