= Frédéric Kanouté =

Mali international footballer (born 1977)

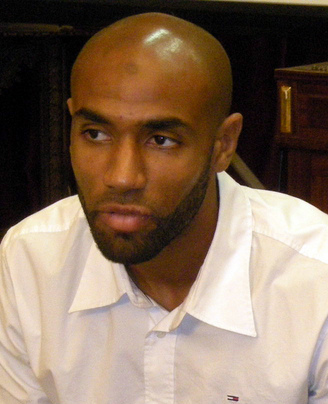
- Kanouté in 2008

Personal information
- Full name: Frédéric Oumar Kanouté
- Date of birth: 2 September 1977 (age 49)
- Place of birth: Sainte-Foy-lès-Lyon, France
- Height: 1.92 m (6 ft 4 in)
- Position: Striker

Senior career*
Years	Team	Apps	(Gls)
1997–2000	Lyon	40	(9)
2000	→ West Ham United (loan)	8	(2)
2000–2003	West Ham United	76	(27)
2003–2005	Tottenham Hotspur	60	(14)
2005–2012	Sevilla	209	(89)
2012–2013	Beijing Guoan	34	(10)
Total		427	(151)

International career
1998–1999	France U21	11	(1)
2004–2010	Mali	38	(23)
- * Club domestic league appearances and goals

Frédéric Oumar "Freddie" Kanouté (born 2 September 1977) is a former professional footballer who played as a striker for several top-tier clubs in Europe, enjoying his greatest success with La Liga side Sevilla. Kanouté was named the 2007 African Footballer of the Year, the first player born outside Africa to win the award.

Kanouté began his career with Lyon in France before moving to West Ham United of the Premier League in 2000. After a spell at their London rivals Tottenham Hotspur, Kanouté moved to Spanish club Sevilla in 2005, where he won two consecutive UEFA Cups in 2006 and 2007, in addition to the Copa del Rey twice and remains the club's highest-scoring foreign player, with 137 goals in 290 matches. After seven seasons there, he joined Chinese club Beijing Guoan in June 2012, spending one season there, before retiring from professional football in 2013.

Born in France, Kanouté represented them at under-21 level, before switching to represent Mali, playing at the 2004 African Cup of Nations, where he was joint top-scorer. He also featured at the 2006 and 2010 tournaments. His international career ended in 2010 with a total of 38 caps and 23 goals.

== Early life ==
Frédéric Oumar Kanouté was born on 2 September 1977 in Sainte-Foy-lès-Lyon, Rhône.

== Club career ==
=== Lyon ===
Kanouté's talents as a striker were first noticed by his local team, Olympique Lyonnais, and he joined them as an apprentice in 1997. He made his debut in the Intertoto Cup against Polish side Odra Wodzisław.

=== West Ham United ===
In March 2000, Kanouté was signed by English Premier League side West Ham United from Olympique Lyonnais on an initial loan basis. After nine first-team appearances in which he scored two goals, he signed permanently in May 2000 on a four-year contract for a reported fee of £4 million. Kanouté made 84 league appearances for West Ham, scoring 29 goals. The club were relegated from the Premier League at the end of the 2002–03 season.

=== Tottenham Hotspur ===
Kanouté was bought by Tottenham Hotspur for a fee of £3.5 million on 5 August 2003. He scored on his debut on 23 August, the winner in a 2-1 home league victory over Leeds United, nine minutes after coming on for Bobby Zamora.

His first season was interrupted by a call-up for the 2004 African Cup of Nations for Mali. Tottenham tried to stop him going by asking FIFA whether Kanouté was eligible to play for Mali after representing France at Under-20 level.

Kanouté was unable to cement himself as a regular at White Hart Lane, as Robbie Keane and Jermain Defoe were preferred. He became a less prolific goalscorer and instead was involved in attacks by setting up various goals with runs at the defence and creating space for other attacking players.

=== Sevilla ===
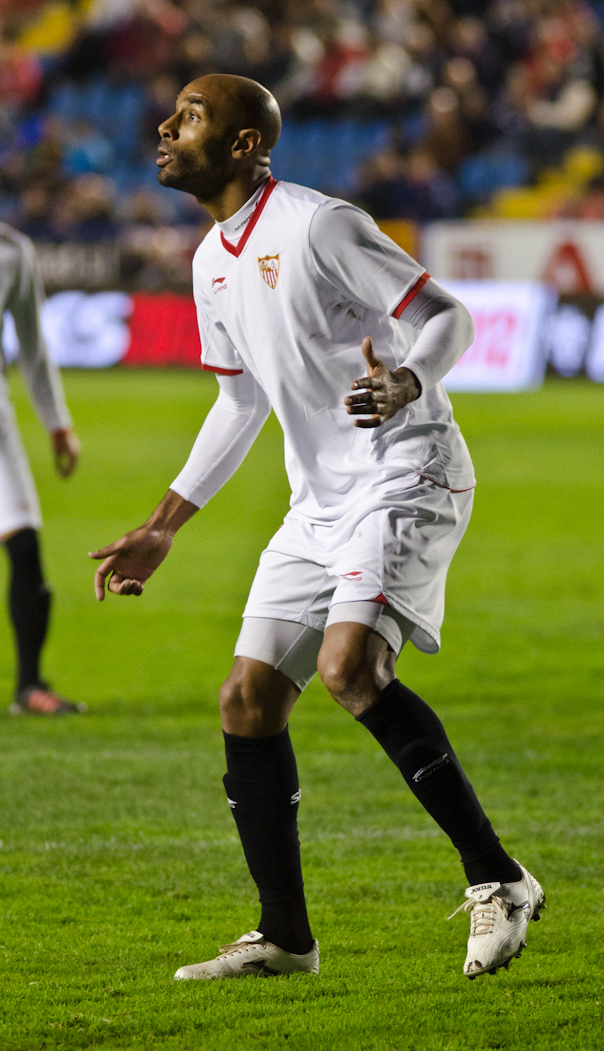
Kanouté playing for Sevilla in 2011

Kanouté was sold to Sevilla on 17 August 2005 for €6.5 million. He was a second-half substitute for the club in the 2006 UEFA Cup Final against Middlesbrough and scored in the 89th minute as Sevilla won 4–0.

In the 2006-07 UEFA Cup, Kanouté's first games for Sevilla against Tottenham Hotspur led to him scoring a penalty at the Ramón Sánchez Pizjuán Stadium in a game marred by crowd trouble, and a goal at White Hart Lane, leaving the final aggregate score 4–3 to Sevilla.

Sevilla's title challenge that year ultimately unravelled and Real Madrid took the title, with Kanouté's side in third. After that, he was a consistent member of the team, helping Sevilla qualify for a UEFA Cup position in 2008 and a Champions League direct qualification in 2009.

On the first day of the 2009–10 season, Kanouté received two yellow cards for fouls against Valencia and was sent off in first half stoppage time.

On 22 October 2011, during the 2011–12 season, Kanouté received two yellow cards against FC Barcelona for kicking the ball off the penalty spot, when Lionel Messi was due to take it. The second yellow was for an altercation between Kanouté and Cesc Fàbregas. Kanouté's farewell season in Spain was plagued with injuries as he participated in 26 matches, scoring four goals and assisting two others – he left at the end of his contract in the summer of 2012. Kanoute became an iconic figure at the Ramon Sanchez Pizjuan, netting 136 goals in 290 matches as helped the club to win two UEFA Cups, one UEFA Super Cup, two Copa del Rey trophies and one Spanish Supercup.

=== Beijing Guoan ===
On 29 June 2012, Kanouté signed a one-and-a-half-year contract with Chinese Super League side Beijing Guoan. On 18 July 2012, he scored his first two goals in his team's 6–0 victory against Qingdao Jonoon in the Chinese FA Cup. In May 2013, Kanouté scored a brace in a Super League fixture against Tianjin Teda.

== International career ==
Kanouté made 11 appearances for the France national under-21 team, scoring one goal, from 1998 to 1999. After turning 21 in 1998, Kanouté was not called up for the France national team in 2000, 2002, or 2004. In 2004, FIFA changed its rules to allow a footballer to play for the national team of the country in which his mother or father was born. Although eligible for either, Kanouté elected to play for Mali rather than for France. Kanouté was joint top goal scorer for Mali at the 2004 African Cup of Nations. Kanouté scored four goals in four matches helping Mali to the semi-finals, where they lost to Morocco.

In October 2007, Kanouté, along with Mali international teammate Mamady Sidibé, were attacked by irate Togolese fans after they knocked Togo out of the African Cup of Nations qualifier. Frederic Kanoute announced his retirement from international football following Mali's elimination from the 2010 Africa Cup of Nations.

== Style of play ==
In 2001, Kanouté was described by The Irish Times in 2001 as "highly skilful, quick-footed, quick-witted and with an eye for the spectacular." Upon signing for Sevilla in 2005, the club's sporting director, Monchi, described Kanouté with the following words: "He's tall, good in the air, skilful and strong and can play up front or just behind the lead striker." Throughout his career he was also known for his eye for goal. In 2020, Chris Howie of beIN Sports described Kanouté as a "tall, languid, graceful [...] striker," also labelling him a "late bloomer."

== Personal life ==
He has been practicing Islam since he was around the age of 20. He refused to wear a Sevilla shirt bearing the name of club sponsor 888.com, due to the fact the website is used for gambling, which is against the principles of Islam; this meant that the club had to give him a brand-free jersey every match. The company, however, agreed to excuse him from their publicity campaigns in return for Kanouté wearing the sponsored kit, which was part of the players' contractual duties. In 2007, Kanouté paid more than US$700,000 out of his pocket to buy a mosque in Seville. The contract on the premises had expired and the mosque was due to be sold. The Islamic community of Spain confirmed it had requested Kanouté's aid after the mosque was put up for sale. Kanouté helped raise over $1m in a crowdfunding campaign to build the mosque.

Kanouté insists his faith has never presented itself as a problem in his relationship with the coaching staff, teammates or fans. He has stated that "Islam has helped me to be this way, so this is normal. It's a path you take to keep you calm, to help you think about the place you live in, to love your neighbour. It's strange when I hear about all these problems of terrorism because it's the opposite of what I understood for Islam."

He observes fasting during the Islamic month of Ramadan. He has stated that "I can keep fasting in Ramadan even when I am playing...it is sometimes harder to keep the fast because here in the south of Spain it is very hot, but I can do it, thank God."

After scoring a goal in a January 2009 Copa Del Rey match against Deportivo La Coruña, Kanouté lifted his jersey and displayed a black shirt underneath emblazoned with the word "Palestine". The action was interpreted by BBC sources as a protest against the Israeli Army operation in the Gaza Strip ongoing at that time. Kanouté was cautioned with a yellow card for displaying a political message, and subsequently fined around $4,000 by the league.

=== The Kanouté Foundation ===
Kanouté has also showed interest in a variety of humanitarian causes. In 2006, he launched an appeal to establish a "Children's Village" in Mali. This is now the well established Sakina Children's Village. Kanouté talks about his Foundation and the Village in the book, How to do good: Essays in Building a Better World, published in December 2016. He also took part in a speaker tour inspired by the book in 2017, speaking in Oslo, Stockholm, Paris and London alongside other humanitarians and philanthropists.

== Career statistics ==
=== Club ===
Club	Season	League			National cup (Note: Includes Coupe de France, FA Cup, Copa del Rey, Chinese FA Cup)		League cup (Note: Includes Coupe de la Ligue, Football League Cup)		Continental		Other		Total	
Club	Season	Division	Apps	Goals	Apps	Goals	Apps	Goals	Apps	Goals	Apps	Goals	Apps	Goals
Lyon	1997–98	French Division 1	18	6	1	0	0	0	10	2	–		29	8
Lyon	1998–99	French Division 1	9	2	0	0	0	0	3 (Note: Appearances in UEFA Cup)	1	–		12	3
Lyon	1999–2000	French Division 1	13	1	0	0	2	0	5 (Note: Two appearances in UEFA Champions League, three appearances in UEFA Cup)	0	–		20	1
Lyon	Total		40	9	1	0	2	0	18	3	–		61	12
West Ham United (loan)	1999–2000	Premier League	8	2	0	0	0	0	–		–		8	2
West Ham United	2000–01	Premier League	32	11	4	3	3	0	–		–		39	14
West Ham United	2001–02	Premier League	27	11	1	1	0	0	–		–		28	12
West Ham United	2002–03	Premier League	17	5	0	0	0	0	–		–		17	5
West Ham United	Total		84	29	5	4	3	0	–		–		92	33
Tottenham Hotspur	2003–04	Premier League	27	7	1	3	3	2	–		–		31	12
Tottenham Hotspur	2004–05	Premier League	32	7	5	0	4	2	–		–		41	9
Tottenham Hotspur	2005–06	Premier League	1	0	–		–		–		–		1	0
Tottenham Hotspur	Total		60	14	6	3	7	4	–		–		73	21
Sevilla	2005–06	La Liga	32	6	2	2	–		11	6	–		45	14
Sevilla	2006–07	La Liga	32	21	5	4	–		10	4	1 (Note: Appearance in UEFA Super Cup)	1	48	30
Sevilla	2007–08	La Liga	30	16	1	1	–		9 (Note: Appearances in UEFA Champions League)	6	2 (Note: One appearance in UEFA Super Cup, one appearance in Supercopa de España)	3	42	26
Sevilla	2008–09	La Liga	34	18	6	3	–		2	2	–		42	23
Sevilla	2009–10	La Liga	27	12	5	1	–		7	2	–		39	15
Sevilla	2010–11	La Liga	28	12	5	1	–		9 (Note: Two appearances and one goal in UEFA Champions League, seven appearances and five goals in UEFA Europa League)	6	1 (Note: Appearance in Supercopa de España)	2	43	21
Sevilla	2011–12	La Liga	26	4	3	3	–		2 (Note: Appearances in UEFA Europa League)	1	–		31	8
Sevilla	Total		209	89	27	15	–		50	27	4	6	290	137
Beijing Guoan	2012	Chinese Super League	10	1	2	2	–		0	0	–		12	3
Beijing Guoan	2013	Chinese Super League	24	9	3	0	–		7 (Note: Appearances in AFC Champions League)	1	–		34	10
Beijing Guoan	Total		34	10	5	2	–		7	1	–		46	13
Career total			427	151	44	24	12	4	75	31	4	6	602	216

=== International ===
Appearances and goals by national team and year
National team	Year	Apps	Goals
Mali	2004	11	7
Mali	2005	3	0
Mali	2006	3	2
Mali	2007	3	2
Mali	2008	9	6
Mali	2009	6	4
Mali	2010	3	2
Total		38	23

Scores and results list Mali's goal tally first, score column indicates score after each Kanouté goal.

List of international goals scored by Frédéric Kanouté
No.	Date	Venue	Opponent	Score	Result	Competition	Ref.
1	26 January 2004	15 October Stadium, Bizerte, Tunisia	Kenya	2–1	3–1	2004 Africa Cup of Nations	
2	26 January 2004	15 October Stadium, Bizerte, Tunisia	Kenya	3–1	3–1	2004 Africa Cup of Nations	
3	30 January 2004	El Menzah Stadium, Tunis, Tunisia	Burkina Faso	1–0	3–1	2004 Africa Cup of Nations	
4	7 February 2004	El Menzah Stadium, Tunis, Tunisia	Guinea	1–1	2–1	2004 Africa Cup of Nations	
5	19 June 2004	Stade du 26 Mars, Bamako, Mali	Zambia	1–1	1–1	2006 FIFA World Cup qualification	
6	18 October 2004	Stade Yves-du-Manoir, Colombes, France	DR Congo	3–0	3–0	Friendly	
7	5 September 2004	Stade du 26 Mars, Bamako, Mali	Senegal	2–1	2–2	2006 FIFA World Cup qualification	
8	28 May 2006	Stade Yves-du-Manoir, Colombes, France	Morocco	1–0	1–0	Friendly	
9	16 August 2006	Parc des Sports et de l'Amitié, Narbonne, France	Tunisia	1–0	1–0	Friendly	
10	25 March 2007	Stade du 26 Mars, Bamako, Mali	Benin	1–1	1–1	2008 Africa Cup of Nations qualification	
11	12 October 2007	Stade de Kégué, Lomé, Togo	Togo	1–0	2–0	2008 Africa Cup of Nations qualification	
12	21 January 2008	Sekondi-Takoradi Stadium, Sekondi-Takoradi, Ghana	Benin	1–0	1–0	2008 Africa Cup of Nations	
13	7 June 2008	Stade Omnisports Idriss Mahamat Ouya, N'Djamena, Chad	Chad	1–0	2–1	2010 FIFA World Cup qualification	
14	7 June 2008	Stade Omnisports Idriss Mahamat Ouya, N'Djamena, Chad	Chad	2–0	2–1	2010 FIFA World Cup qualification	
15	14 June 2008	Khartoum Stadium, Khartoum, Sudan	Sudan	1–1	2–3	2010 FIFA World Cup qualification	
16	14 June 2008	Khartoum Stadium, Khartoum, Sudan	Sudan	2–3	2–3	2010 FIFA World Cup qualification	
17	22 June 2008	Stade du 26 Mars, Bamako, Mali	Sudan	1–0	3–0	2010 FIFA World Cup qualification	
18	11 February 2009	Bois-Guillaume, France	Angola	3–0	4–0	Friendly	
19	28 March 2009	Al-Merrikh Stadium, Omdurman, Sudan	Sudan	1–0	1–1	2010 FIFA World Cup qualification	
20	21 June 2009	Stade du 26 Mars, Bamako, Mali	Benin	3–1	3–1	2010 FIFA World Cup qualification	
21	11 October 2009	Stade du 26 Mars, Bamako, Mali	Sudan	1–0	1–0	2010 FIFA World Cup qualification	
22	10 January 2010	Estádio 11 de Novembro, Talatona. Angola	Angola	2–4	4–4	2010 Africa Cup of Nations	
23	18 January 2010	Estádio Nacional do Chiazi, Cabinda, Angola	Malawi	1–0	3–1	2010 Africa Cup of Nations	

== Honours ==
Lyon

- UEFA Intertoto Cup: 1997

Sevilla

- Copa del Rey: 2006–07, 2009–10
- Supercopa de España: 2007
- UEFA Cup: 2005–06, 2006–07
- UEFA Super Cup: 2006

Individual

- Africa Cup of Nations Team of the Tournament: 2004
- African Footballer of the Year: 2007
- ESM Team of the Season: 2006–07
