= Mririda n'Ait Attik =

Berber Moroccan Shilha poet

Mririda n Ayt Atiq
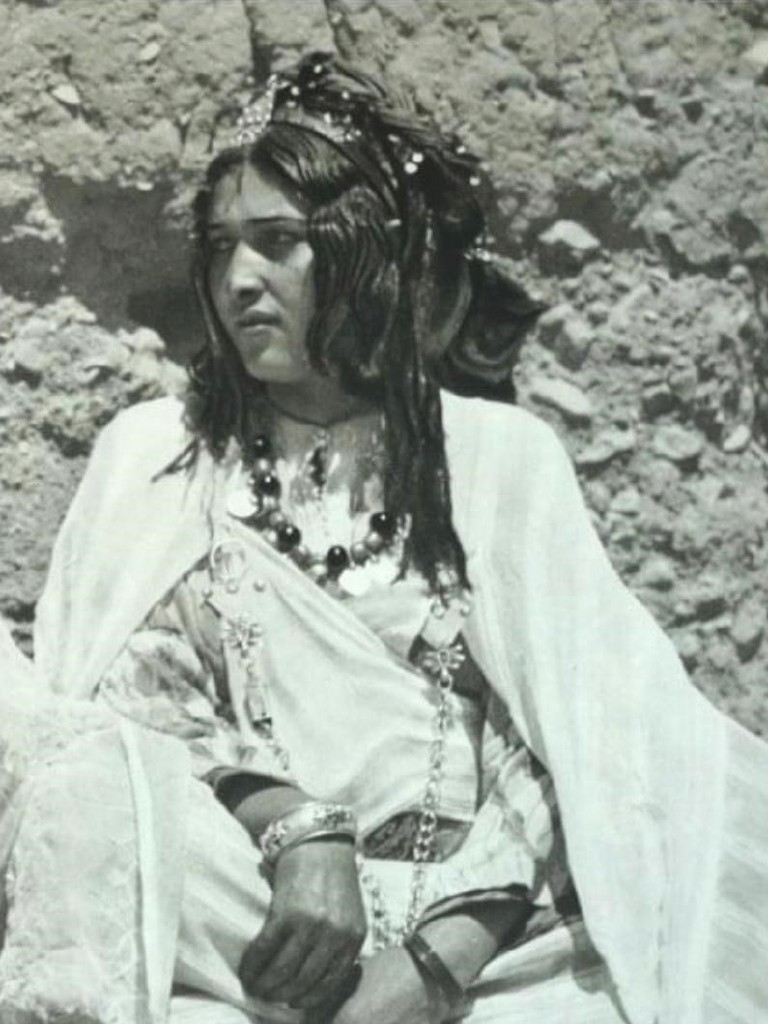
- Mririda n Ayt Atiq, c. 1940
- Born: c. 1900; Megdaz, Tassaout valley^{→fr}, Morocco
- Died: c. 1940s
- Other name: Mririda n'Ait Attik
- Occupations: Poet, singer, feminist
- Years active: c. 1920s–1940s

Mririda n'Aït Attik (in Amazigh: Mririda n Ayt Atiq) (c. 1900 – c. 1940s) was a Berber Moroccan Shilha poet writing in Tashelhit. She was born in Megdaz in the Tassaout valley. Her poems were put to paper and translated into French in the 1930s by René Euloge, a French civil servant based in Azilal.

Little is known about her life. Born in the village of Megdaz, in the Tassaout valley, Mririda married at a very early age, but soon fled her unhappy life at home to become an itinerant oral poet and performer. She toured from market to market, improvising and performing her poetry, which she composed in Tashelhit.

Mririda was the pen name she used on stage, and her real name is unknown. She was illiterate and never committed her poems to paper. Her poetry dealt with topics tabu at the time (particularly coming from a woman poet), such as divorce, love between women, household problems, and unrequited love, and she openly voiced her inner thoughts as a means of resistance and rebellion against a culture of patriarchy.

During the 1940s, she is said to have been a courtesan in the souk (marketplace) in Azilal, and was famed for the songs she sang to the men who visited her house. By the end of WWII, Mririda had disappeared. No one knows when or where she died.

== Books ==
=== Poetry collections ===
- Les Chants de la Tassaout de Mririda N’aït Attik (1959, tr. René Euloge)
- Songs of Mririda by Mririda n’Ait Attik (1974, translated from Euloge's version in French by Daniel Halpern and Paula Paley)
- Tassawt Voices, by Mririda n-Ayt Attiq and René Euloge (2001, translated from Euloge's version in French by Michael Peyron)

=== Anthologies ===
- Bending the Bow: an anthology of African love poetry, ed. Frank M. Chipasula (2009)
  - Mririda N’Ait Atiq: The Brooch (poem)
- The Penguin Book of Women Poets, ed. Carol Cosman, Joan Keefe, and Kathleen Weaver (1978)
  - Mririda N’Ait Atiq: God hasn't made room (poem)

== Bibliography ==
- Les Chants de la Tassaout de Mririda N'aït Attik, trad. René Euloge, Maroc Editions, 1972
  - Songs of Mririda, by Mririda n’Ait Attik and René Euloge, translated by Daniel Halpern and Paula Paley, Unicorn Press, Greensboro, N.C., 1974. LCCN 74-82761.
  - Tassawt Voices, by Mririda n-Ayt Attiq and René Euloge, translated by Michael Peyron, AUI Press, Ifrane 2008. ISBN 9789954413722.
- Haddad, Lahcen. "Engaging Patriarchy and Oral Tradition: Mririda N'Ait Attik or the Gendered Subaltern's Strategies of Appropriation and Deconstruction", in: Le Discours sur la Femme Ed. Fouzia Ghissassi, Rabat: Publications de la Faculté des Lettres et des Sciences Humaines, n° 65.
- Glacier, Osire (2013). Political Women in Morocco: Then and Now [Femmes politiques au Maroc: d'hier à aujourd'hui: la résistance et le pouvoir au féminin]. Translated by Martin, Valérie. Trenton, NJ: Africa World Press. ISBN 9781569023761. LCCN 2013-7811. (Online French version at Researchgate.)
- Simour, Lhoussain: Colonial Encounters in Gendered Settings – Reflections on Mrīrīda nʾait ʿAtiq, a Moroccan Amazīgh Courtesan and Singing Poet, in Teresa Iribarren, Roger Canadell, Josep-Anton Fernàndez (eds.), Narratives of Violence, (Biblioteca di Rassegna iberistica; 21), Venice: Edizioni Ca’ Foscari – Digital Publishing, 2021. ISBN 978-88-6969-460-8.
