= Michael Peyron =

Berberist specialist and historian

Dr. Michael Peyron (born 1935) is a specialist in the field of Berber language, literature and culture. He is also well known as a writer on tourism in Morocco.

Michael Peyron was born in the Cannes, France. He has studied in France (at the universities of Bordeaux and Grenoble). His doctoral thesis at the Institut de Géographie Alpine, Grenoble's University, was on an Amazigh area in the High Atlas Mountains of Morocco: "Tounfit et le pays Aït Yahia"

Peyron taught at the Faculty of Letters of Mohammed V University in Rabat (1973–1988) and in the English Department at Grenoble University (1988–95). In the late 1980s, the focus of his career switched from English to Amazigh studies. From 1995 to 1997 he was a guest lecturer at King Fahd School for Translation (Tangier, Morocco), and since 1997 has been a visiting professor at Al Akhawayn University in Ifrane.

== Publications ==
Michael Peyron speaking Tamazight

Michael Peyron's publications include two volumes of bi-lingual Berber-French poetry and a collection of folktales in a Berber-English edition. Since 1985 he has regularly contributed entries to the Encyclopédie berbère

- "Deux contes berbères dans le parler des Ayt Ali ou Brahim de Tounfit (Haut Atlas marocain).", in: Etudes et documents berbères 8, 1991, pp 53–62
- "Isaffen ghbanin": Rivières profondes : poésies du Moyen-Atlas marocain traduites et annotées, Wallada, 1993, ISBN 978-9981-823-04-4
- Arsène Roux and Michael Peyron, Poésies berbères de l’époque héroïque, Maroc central (1908–1932), Aix-en-Provence: Edisud 2002
- Harry Stroomer and Michael Peyron, Catalogue des archives berbères du "Fonds. Arsène Roux », Berber Studies 6, Rüdiger Köppe Verlag, Köln 2003
- “Langue poétique littéraire : enjeux et mutations chez les poètes du Maroc central”, La littérature amazighe : oralité et écriture, spécificités et perspectives, Rabat, I.R.C.A.M., 2004 : 191-199
- “Bringing Berber literature out of the academic wilderness”, Expressions maghrébines, Universistat de Barcelona & Florida State University, (Marta Segarra, ed.), Vol.4, n°1, 2005: 15-33
- “Le paysage imaginaire de la poésie amazighe du Moyen-Atlas”, Linguistique amazighe : les nouveaux horizons, (A. Allati, éd.), Tétouan, Fac. des Lettres, 2006 : 224-236
- Tassawt Voices, by Mririda n-Ayt Attiq and René Euloge, translated by Michael Peyron, AUI Press, Ifrane 2008
- Great Atlas: Traverse Morocco (two volumes), West Col Productions (first published in 1989), ISBN 978-0-906227-40-4
- The Amazigh Studies Reader, 2008
- Berber Odes, 2010
- Mountains worth living for, 2019
- The Berbers of Morocco: A History of Resistance, I.B. Tauris, 2020
