= Habib Sissoko =

Footballer (born 1971)

Personal information
- Full name: Habib Sissoko
- Date of birth: 24 May 1971 (age 55)
- Place of birth: Juvisy-sur-Orge, France
- Height: 1.90 m (6 ft 3 in)
- Position: Forward

Senior career*
Years	Team	Apps	(Gls)
1996–1997	Olympique Noisy-le-Sec		
1997–1998	Louhans-Cuiseaux		
1998	Preston North End	7	(0)
1998	Airdrieonians	1	(1)
1998–2000	União Leiria		
2000	Cappelen		
2000–2001	Torquay United	14	(2)
2001–2002	Red Star 93		
2002–2003	Nîmes	24	(6)
2003–2004	Brest	20	(8)
2004–2005	Cannes	29	(5)
2005–2006	Rouen		
- * Club domestic league appearances and goals

Habib Sissoko (born 24 May 1971) is a former professional footballer who played as a forward.

== Career ==
Born in Juvisy-sur-Orge, Essonne, Sissoko joined Olympique Noisy-le-Sec in 1996, moving on to CS Louhans-Cuiseaux in the 1997 close season. He joined Preston North End in February 1998, making his league debut, as a second-half substitute for Kurt Nogan, in a 1–1 draw away to Wycombe Wanderers on 21 February 1998. He played seven times for North End before being released at the end of the season.

He joined Airdrieonians on trial in August 1998, scoring a late winner on his only appearance having come on as a 70th-minute substitute for Stuart Taylor in the home game against St Mirren on 22 August 1998.

In October 1998 he joined Portuguese side União Leiria joining Belgian side Cappelen in the 1999–2000 season. He was released at the end of the season and returned to England, joining Torquay United on trial, signing on a free transfer in July 2000. He was one of three French players to play for Torquay that season, the others being Jules Mendy and Khalid Chalqi.

His Torquay debut came on 12 August 2000, a 2–0 defeat away to Kidderminster Harriers, with his first goal coming two weeks later in a 3–2 win home to Blackpool. Despite a good start to his Plainmoor career, Sissoko struggled to establish himself in Torquay's struggling side. He was sacked by the club on 23 April 2001 after an angry reaction to being substituted in the defeat away to local rivals Plymouth Argyle.

In July 2001, Sissoko signed for Parisian side Red Star 93. He subsequently played for Nîmes Olympique before joining Stade Brestois 29 in 2003, immediately becoming embroiled in controversy. On leaving Nîmes he still had a three match suspension in place, but played in the first three games for Brest after his move, against AS Cannes, US Raon-l'Étape and Libourne-Saint-Seurin. Brest won all three games and the three clubs appealed. However, the French Football Federation rejected the appeal and allowed the results to stand, confirming Brest's promotion to League 2 instead of Cannes, who Sissoko subsequently joined in 2004.

He was released at the end of the season and in October 2005 he looked set to sign for Belgian side Louvière until the end of the season, but it fell through. On 16 November 2005, he signed for FC Rouen. His contract with Rouen was terminated in March 2006, 'a victim of his bad temper'.
