= Megdaz =

Amazigh village in High Atlas, Morocco

Megdaz ⵎⴳⴷⴰⵣ Megdez
- Village
- Location within Morocco
- Coordinates: 31.3913°N 6.7919°W
- Country: Morocco
- Region: Béni Mellal-Khénifra
- Province: Azilal Province
- Rural commune: Ait Tamlil
- Elevation: 1,900 m (6,200 ft)

Population
  - Total: 700
- Time zone: UTC+0 (WET)
  - Summer (DST): UTC+1 (WEST)

Megdaz (also spelled Magdaz) is a village in the High Atlas Mountains of Morocco, in the upper Tessaout Valley at roughly 1,900–2,000 metres above sea level. It is noted in academic and travel literature for vernacular architecture and collective granaries (ighrem). The Independent has described Megdaz as “perhaps the best” of the many beautiful Berber villages in the Atlas.

== Geography ==
Megdaz lies on steep slopes in the upper Tessaout basin of the central High Atlas, a remote area of terraced fields, irrigation channels and red-clay cliffs. The village forms part of the high valleys landscape used for mixed agro-pastoral livelihoods and is a common stop on trekking routes in the M’Goun region.

== Architecture and built heritage ==
Dwellings in Megdaz typically use rammed earth, stone and timber, arranged in compact multi-storey clusters along the mountainside. The site is particularly noted for fortified communal granaries (ighrem)—multi-storey structures historically used to store grain and valuables and to provide refuge—along with watchtowers and defensive walls. Recent scholarship has analysed the spatial organisation of the Megdaz house, village and landscape within Amazigh vernacular traditions.

== Culture ==
Megdaz is an Tashlhit-speaking community. It is cited as the birthplace of the celebrated Amazigh poet-singer Mririda n'Ait Attik, whose songs from the Tessaout and Azilal markets were collected and translated in the early 20th century.

== Economy and tourism ==
Household economies combine irrigated terrace agriculture (notably walnuts, almonds and cereals), pastoralism and seasonal migration. Traditional gravity-fed channels (seguia/targa) distribute water to terrace systems across High Atlas valleys, including the Tessaout. Trekking in the M’Goun area regularly features Megdaz as a stage village and viewpoint over the “red valley” of the Tessaout. Civil-society projects have highlighted Megdaz’s heritage and small-scale agriculture within the rural commune of Aït Tamlil (Azilal Province).

== See also ==
- High Atlas
- M'Goun
- Berber architecture
