= Canton of Athis-Mons =

Coordinates: 48.71°N 2.39°E

The canton of Athis-Mons is an administrative division of the Essonne department, Île-de-France region, northern France. Its borders were modified at the French canton reorganisation which came into effect in March 2015. Its seat is in Athis-Mons.

It consists of the following communes:

1. Athis-Mons
2. Juvisy-sur-Orge
3. Paray-Vieille-Poste
