= Hôtel de Ville, Athis-Mons =

Town hall in Athis-Mons, France

Hôtel de Ville
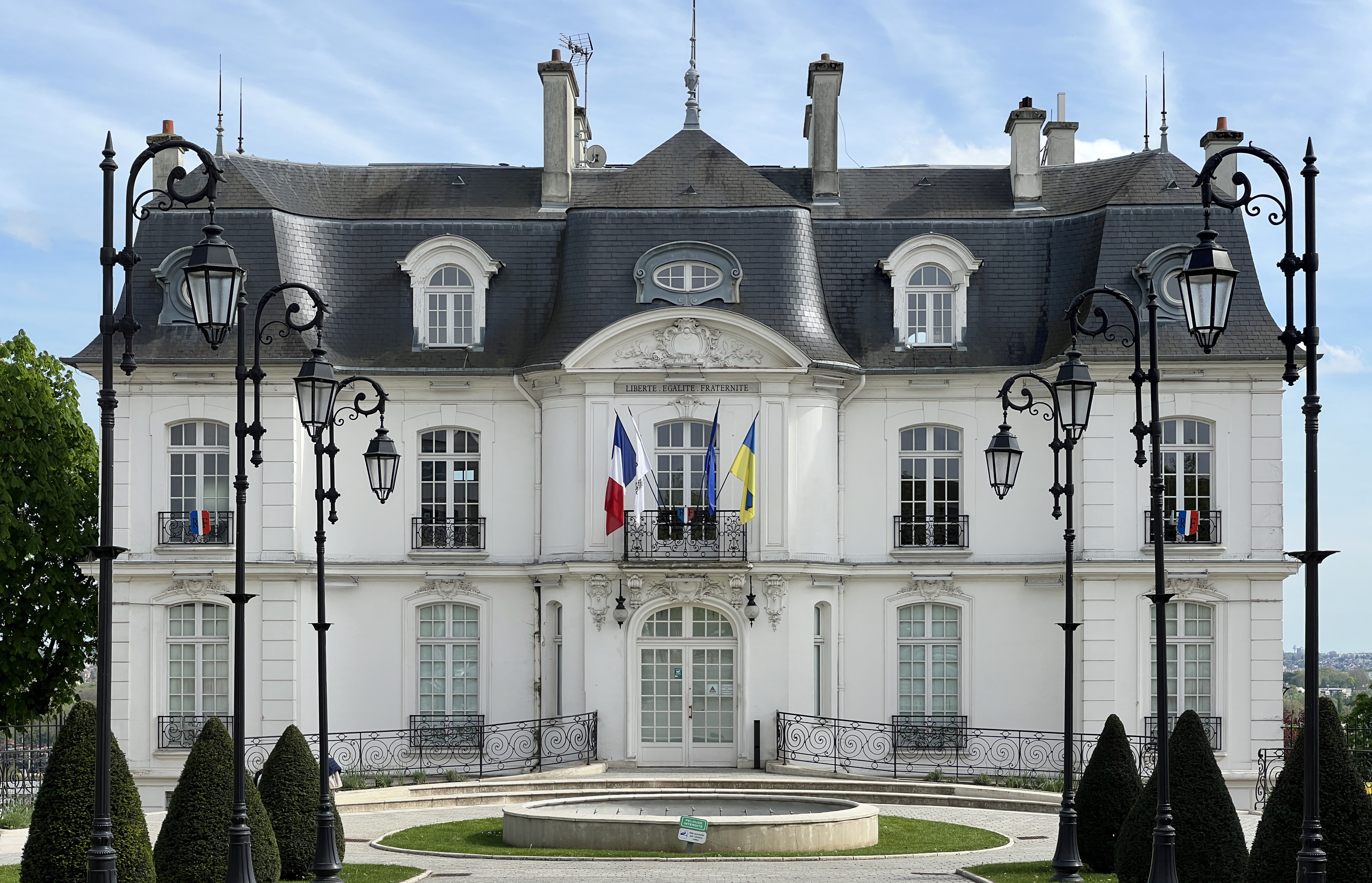
- The main frontage of the Hôtel de Ville in April 2024
- Interactive map of the Hôtel de Ville area

General information
- Type: City hall
- Architectural style: Neoclassical style
- Location: Athis-Mons, France
- Coordinates: 48.7073°N 2.3889°E
- Completed: 1893

Design and construction
- Architect: Jean Louis Henri Pucey

The Hôtel de Ville (French pronunciation: [otɛl də vil], City Hall) is a municipal building in Athis-Mons, Essonne, in the southern suburbs of Paris, standing on Place du Général-de-Gaulle. It has been included on the Inventaire général des monuments by the French Ministry of Culture since 2001.

== History ==
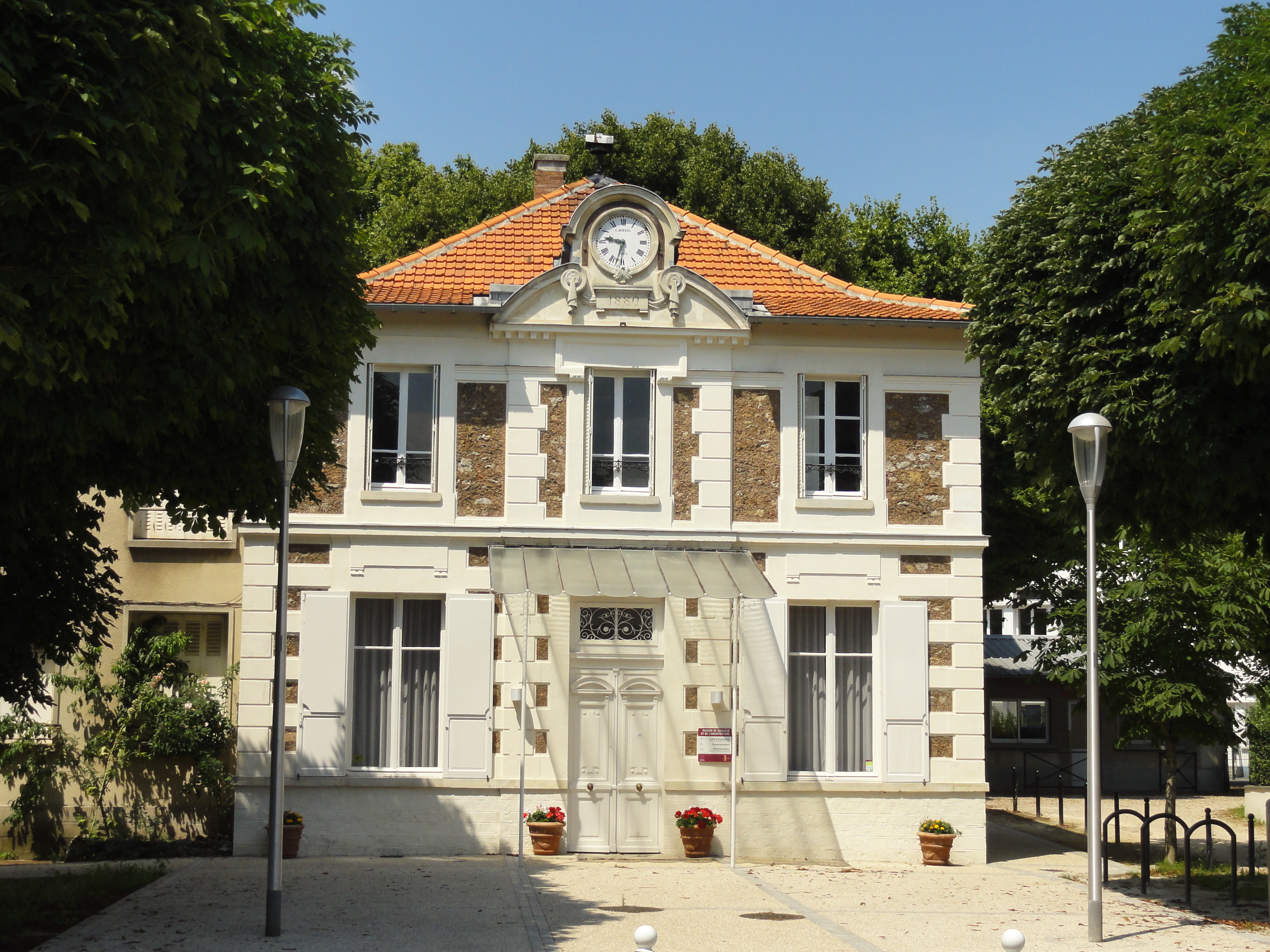
The old town hall

Following the merger of the communes of Athis-sur-Orge and Mons-sur-Orge to form Athis-Mons in 1817, the new town council initially met at the home of the mayor at the time. This arrangement continued until 1837, when the council commissioned a combined town hall and school on the Grande Rue (now Rue Geneviève-Anthonioz-de-Gaulle). After this building was destroyed by Prussian troops during the Franco-Prussian War of 1870, the council decided to commission and new building also on the Grande Rue. The new building was designed by Eugène Tuane, with detailed design by Félix Ferrari, in the Beaux-Arts style, built in gritstone and completed in 1880.

The design involved a symmetrical main frontage of three bays facing onto the street. The central bay featured a doorway on the ground floor and a casement window on the first floor, all surmounted by a semi-circular pediment, a clock and a finial. The outer bays were fenestrated by casement windows with stone surrounds. Internally, the municipal offices were on the ground floor and the classroom and teacher's accommodation were on the first floor. After the building was no longer required for municipal use, it was used as a police station and then as a venue for community organisations before becoming the Maison de Banlieue et de l'Architecture (House of Suburbs and Architecture) in 1999.

In the late 1920s, following significant population growth, the council led by the mayor, Marius Paquereaux, decided to acquire a more substantial municipal building. The building they selected was the Château d'Avaucourt. The château dated back at least to the early 15th century. It was owned by a local seigneur, Jean du Puy, in 1412 before being acquired by a lawyer, Jean de Piedefer. It was then sold to the d'Avaugour family before coming into the ownership of Louise Anne de Bourbon, Mademoiselle de Charolais in 1756.

After various further changes of ownership, it was remodelled in the late 19th century. The new structure was designed by Jean Louis Henri Pucey in the neoclassical style, built in brick with a stucco finish and was completed in 1893. It was then acquired by a diplomat, Alphonse Chodron de Courcel, in 1906 and, after his death, his family sold it to the council in 1929. The design involved a symmetrical main frontage of five bays facing onto the street. The central bay, which was slightly projected forward, contained a segmental headed doorway on the ground floor and a segmental headed French door with a balcony on the first floor. The bay was flanked by curved edges and featured by an ogee-shaped roof, which contained an oculus and was surmounted by a pyramid and a finial. The wings were fenestrated with segmental headed casement windows on both floors, and the roof swept round in a curve to the end bays, which were also slightly projected forward. Internally, the principal room was the Salle des Mariages.

During the Second World War, the deputy mayor, Lucien Midol, was arrested on account of his communist sympathies and imprisoned at the Puy-en-Velay Remand Centre and then at Maison-Carrée Prison in Algeria. He returned to the town hall in 1945 and was elected mayor. An administrative centre was built to a design by Sieur Goldstein on a site to the northeast of the main building in 1971; it was re-configured to a design by EA+LLA in 2013.
