= 1973 French cantonal elections =

Cantonale elections to renew canton general councillors were held in France on 23 and 30 September 1973.

== Electoral system ==
The cantonales elections use the same system as the regional or legislative elections. There is a 10% threshold (10% of registered voters) needed to proceed to the second round.

== National results ==
Runoff results missing

Party/Alliance	% (first round)	Seats
PCF	22.7%	205
PS	21.9%	423
Miscellaneous Right	18.6%	467
UDR	12.7%	244
MR-Centrists	8.6%	183
Miscellaneous Left	6.4%	174
RI	6.2%	153
MRG	2%	68
Far-Left	1%	9
