= Frédéric Havas =

French volleyball player (born 1973)

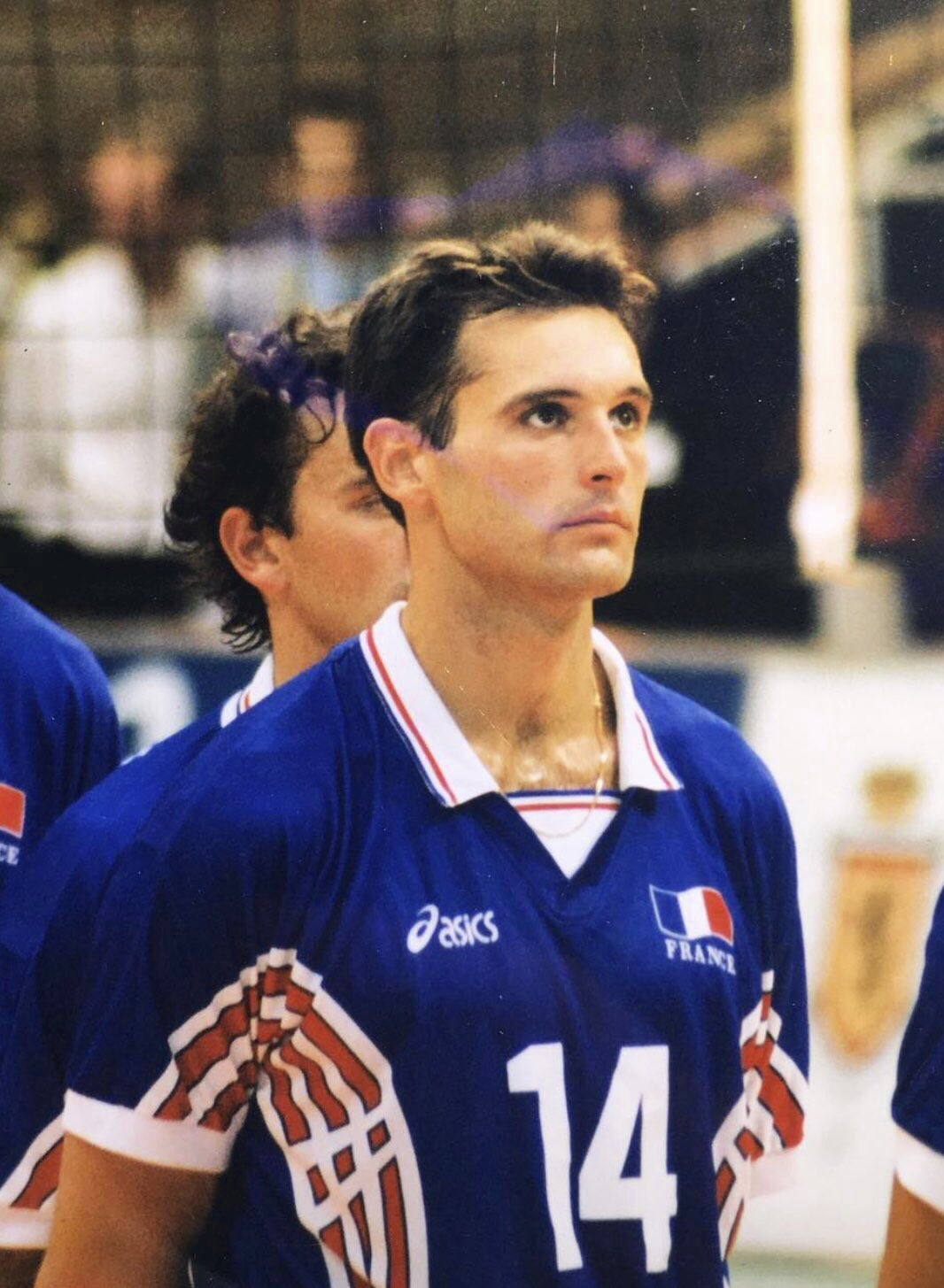
Frédéric Havas

Frédéric Havas (born May 17, 1973) is a retired volleyball player from France, born in Kaolack, Senegal, who earned a total number of 138 caps for the French men's national team.

== International competitions ==
- 1999 – World League (7th place)
- 1999 – European Championship (6th place)
- 2000 – World League (7th place)
