= Jules de Balincourt =

French painter (born 1972)

- Ambitious New Plans, oil on board, 102x152cm, 2005
- Born: 1972 (age 53–54); Paris, France
- Education: California College of Arts and Crafts, Hunter College
- Known for: Painting, sculpture
- Website: http://www.julesdebalincourt.com/

Jules de Balincourt (born 1972) is a French-born American contemporary artist, based in Brooklyn, New York. He is best known for his abstract, atmospheric paintings, with saturated colors, blurring the line between fantasy and reality.

== Biography ==
In 1972 de Balincourt was born in Paris and moved throughout his childhood but primarily grew up near the Malibou Lake area in the Santa Monica Mountains. He was educated in the San Francisco Bay Area at the California College of the Arts (CCA), receiving a B.F.A. in ceramics in 1998 and went on to study in New York City at the Hunter College graduating in 2005 with an M.F.A.

In 2006, de Balincourt founded the alternative art space Starr Space (formerly known as Starr Street Projects) in Brooklyn, New York. Starr Space operated for three years and was used for diverse community programming, art events, yoga, weekly farmers market, rock shows, church parties and fundraisers, notable performances and performers such as Ryan Trecartin, Terence Koh, Rita Ackermann, Mirror Mirror, the Slits, Lucky Dragons and Harmony Korine.

To create his paintings, he doesn't often work from photos or drawings. In his paintings he uses stencils, tape, knives and spray paint in the style of Outsider art.

Carol Lee called de Balincourt the "mayor of Bushwick" in an article for Paper.

== Exhibitions ==
His work has been exhibited at prominent international galleries and museums including Musee d’Art Moderne de la Ville de Paris and Palais de Tokyo in Paris, Mori Museum in Tokyo (solo) and has been featured in high-profile exhibitions including, “Greater New York” at the P.S.1 Contemporary Art Center and MOMA in New York, and “USA Today” at the Royal Academy in London.

His work is in prominent collections, including the Oppenheimer – JCCC Collection for the Nerman Museum of Contemporary Art, and the Saatchi Gallery, Brooklyn museum, LACMA.
