= Olivier Enjolras =

French footballer (born 1971)

Personal information
- Full name: Olivier Enjolras
- Date of birth: December 28, 1971 (age 54)
- Place of birth: Clermont-Ferrand, France
- Height: 1.83 m (6 ft 0 in)
- Position: Goalkeeper

Senior career*
Years	Team	Apps	(Gls)
1994–2007	Clermont Foot	300	(0)
2007–2009	AS Yzeure	25	(0)
2010–2011	Clermont Foot	0	(0)
Total		325	(0)
- * Club domestic league appearances and goals

Olivier Enjolras is a French former footballer who spent several seasons with Clermont Foot. (Note: Olivier Enjolras – French league stats at LFP – also available in French (archived))
