= Samir Amirèche =

Footballer (born 1972)

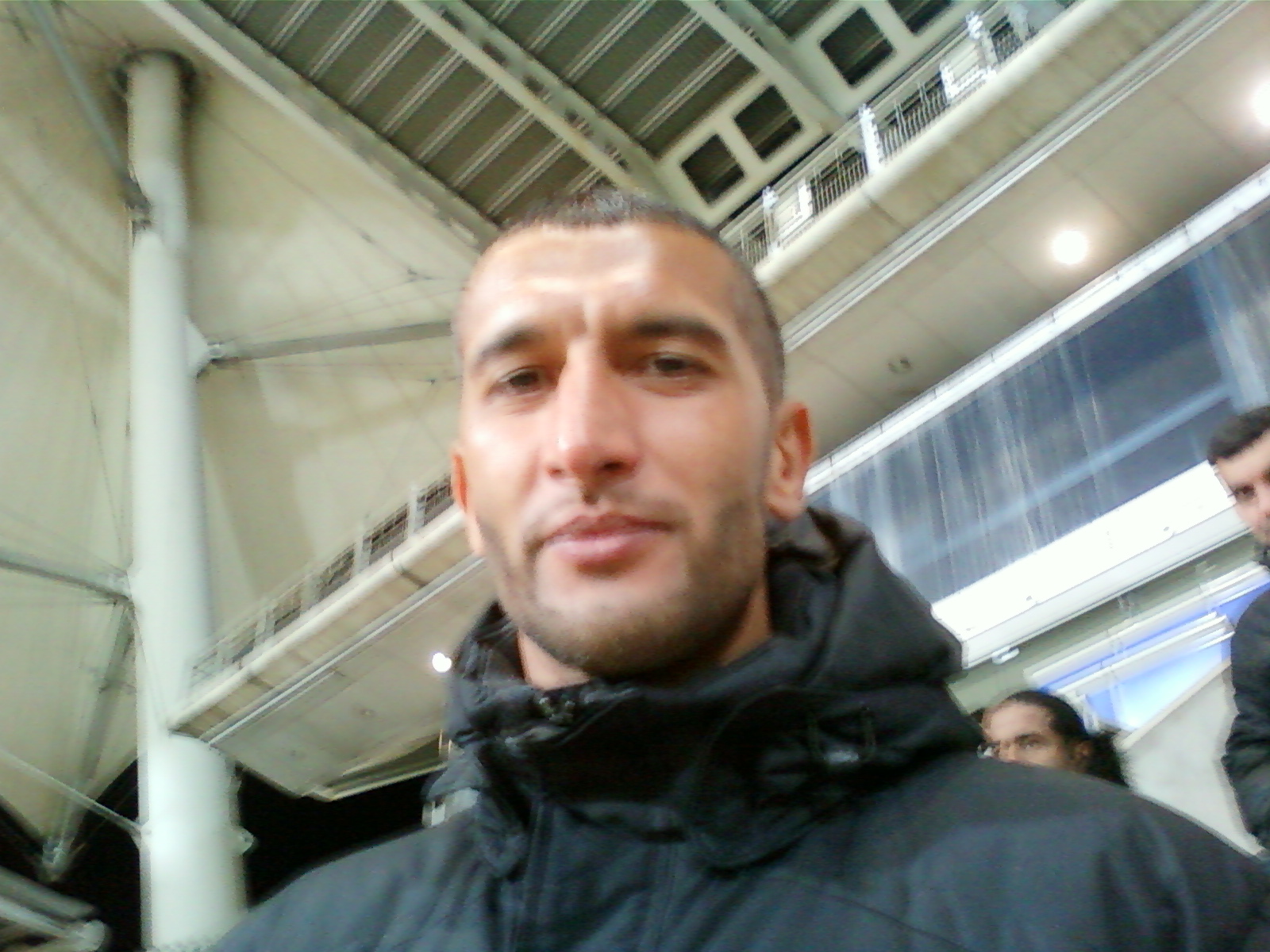
- Amirèche in 2012

Personal information
- Date of birth: 28 June 1972 (age 54)
- Place of birth: Paris, France
- Height: 1.85 m (6 ft 1 in)
- Position: Defender

Youth career
- 1977–1988: AJA Maison-Alfort
- 1988: Le Havre
- 1988–1990: Lions d'Alfortville

Senior career*
Years	Team	Apps	(Gls)
1994–1996	Paris Saint-Germain B	55	(2)
1996–1997	US Créteil	22	(0)
1997–1998	Noisy-Le-Sec	32	(4)
1998–1999	Étoile Sportive du Sahel		
1999–2000	União da Madeira	17	(1)
2000–2007	US Créteil	150	(7)
2007–2008	Al Gharafa		
2008–2009	UJA Alfortville	42	(2)

International career
1998	Algeria	5	(0)
- * Club domestic league appearances and goals

Samir Amirèche (born 28 June 1972) is a former professional footballer who played as a defender. Born in France, he made five appearances for the Algeria national team at international level.
