= Louis-Karim Nébati =

French actor (born 1971)

Louis-Karim Nébati (born August 25, 1971) is a French actor, born in Bénouville (Calvados).

== TV acting ==
- 2001 – 2006 : Fabien Cosma
- 2003 : Les femmes savantes
- 2004 : Léa Parker
- 2005 : Malone
- 2007 : 5 sur cinq

== Theatre ==
- 1994 : Meurtre de la princesse juive
- 1995 : Folle Amanda
- from 1996 to 1998: La Vie en Rose
- from 1996 to 1998: Les femmes savantes
