= Sylvain Deplace =

French professional footballer (born 1972)

Personal information
- Date of birth: 4 January 1972 (age 54)
- Place of birth: Lyon, France
- Height: 1.72 m (5 ft 8 in)
- Position: Midfielder

Youth career
- 1990–1991: Lyon

Senior career*
Years	Team	Apps	(Gls)
1991–1997	Lyon	180	(2)
1997–1998	Montpellier	15	(0)
1998–2001	Guingamp	79	(3)
2001–2002	Martigues	28	(1)
Total		302	(6)

International career
199?–1994	France U-21		
- * Club domestic league appearances and goals

Sylvain Deplace (born 4 January 1972) is a French former professional footballer who played as a midfielder.
