= Nicolas Fargues =

French novelist

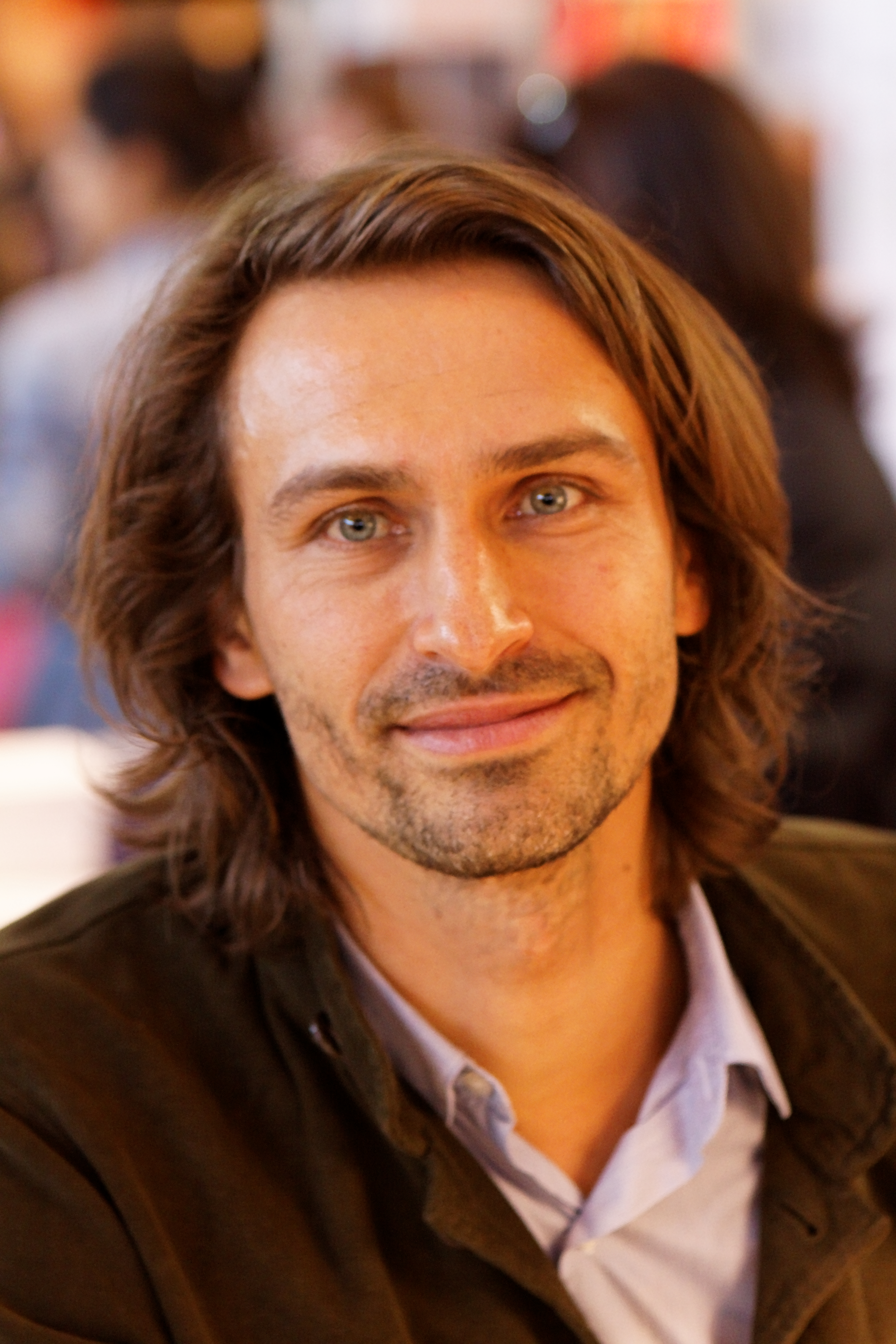
Nicolas Fargues (2011)

Nicolas Fargues (born 8 March 1972) is a French novelist.

From 1998 to 2002, he had various jobs in journalism, libraries and publishing. He published two novels Le Tour du propriétaire (2000) and Demain si vous le voulez bien (2001) before achieving his first major public and critical success, with One Man Show, published in 2002. This book is based on his own experiences in the media world where he encountered celebrities whom he found "smaller and more tired than on the screen". Two years later, he published Rade Terminus, which was inspired by his experience as an expatriate, directing the Alliance Française in Antsiranana (Madagascar).

His most recent books are J'étais derrière toi (2006) and Beau rôle (2008).
