= Cédric Lécluse =

French footballer and manager (born 1972)

Personal information
- Full name: Cédric Lécluse
- Date of birth: March 29, 1972 (age 54)
- Place of birth: Épinay-sur-Seine, France
- Height: 1.85 m (6 ft 1 in)
- Position: Defender

Team information
- Current team: Troyes (U16 manager)

Youth career
- Nancy

Senior career*
Years	Team	Apps	(Gls)
1991–2002	Nancy	328	(4)
2002–2003	Shanghai Cosco		
2003–2007	Nancy	88	(5)
2007–2008	Angers	32	(3)

Managerial career
- 2014–2015: AF Laxou Sapiniere
- 2015–2016: Progrès Niederkorn (assistant)
- 2016–2019: AS Montigny-lès-Metz
- 2019–: Troyes (U16)
- * Club domestic league appearances and goals

Cédric Lécluse (born March 29, 1972) is a French former professional footballer who played as a defender. He is the manager of Troyes AC's U16 squad.

== Career ==
Lecluse was born in Épinay-sur-Seine. He spent the majority of his career with AS Nancy. He played for Nancy from 1991 to 2002 before leaving to play in China for Shanghai Cosco. After a year in China he returned to Nancy and played there until 2007. He then signed for Angers SCO but had a disappointing spell there and after leaving he decided to retire.

== Honours ==
Nancy

- Coupe de la Ligue: 2005–06
