= 1971 French municipal elections =

Municipal elections were held in France on 14 and 21 March 1971. Georges Pompidou had been in power since 1969 by 1971. The UDR gained in the radical south-west while the French Communist Party (PCF) gained in the north and east. On the left, the socialists, although still administering numerous cities with the "moderates", the strategy of unions with the PCF developed, marked mostly by the withdrawal of candidates in runoff to profit one party.

== Sources ==
- History of French Local Elections
