= Christophe Medaillon =

French footballer (born 1973)

Personal information
- Full name: Christophe Medaillon
- Date of birth: 11 January 1973 (age 53)
- Place of birth: Tarbes, France
- Position: Midfielder

Senior career*
Years	Team	Apps	(Gls)
1993–1994	Saint-Étienne	5	(0)
1994–1997	Red Star	23	(1)
1997	Pau		
1997–2001	L'Etrat		
- * Club domestic league appearances and goals

Christophe Medaillon (born 11 January 1973) is a French former professional footballer who played as a midfielder.
