= Fabrice Bry =

French volleyball player (born 1972)

Fabrice Bry (born April 2, 1972 in Saint-Pierre-lès-Nemours, Seine-et-Marne) is a retired volleyball player from France, who earned a total number of 85 caps for the Men's National Team.

== International Competitions ==
- 1997 – European Championship (4th place)
- 1999 – World League (7th place)
- 1999 – European Championship (6th place)
- 2000 – World League (7th place)
- 2001 – World League (6th place)
- 2001 – European Championship (7th place)
