= Athis-Mons =

Commune in Île-de-France, France

- Commune
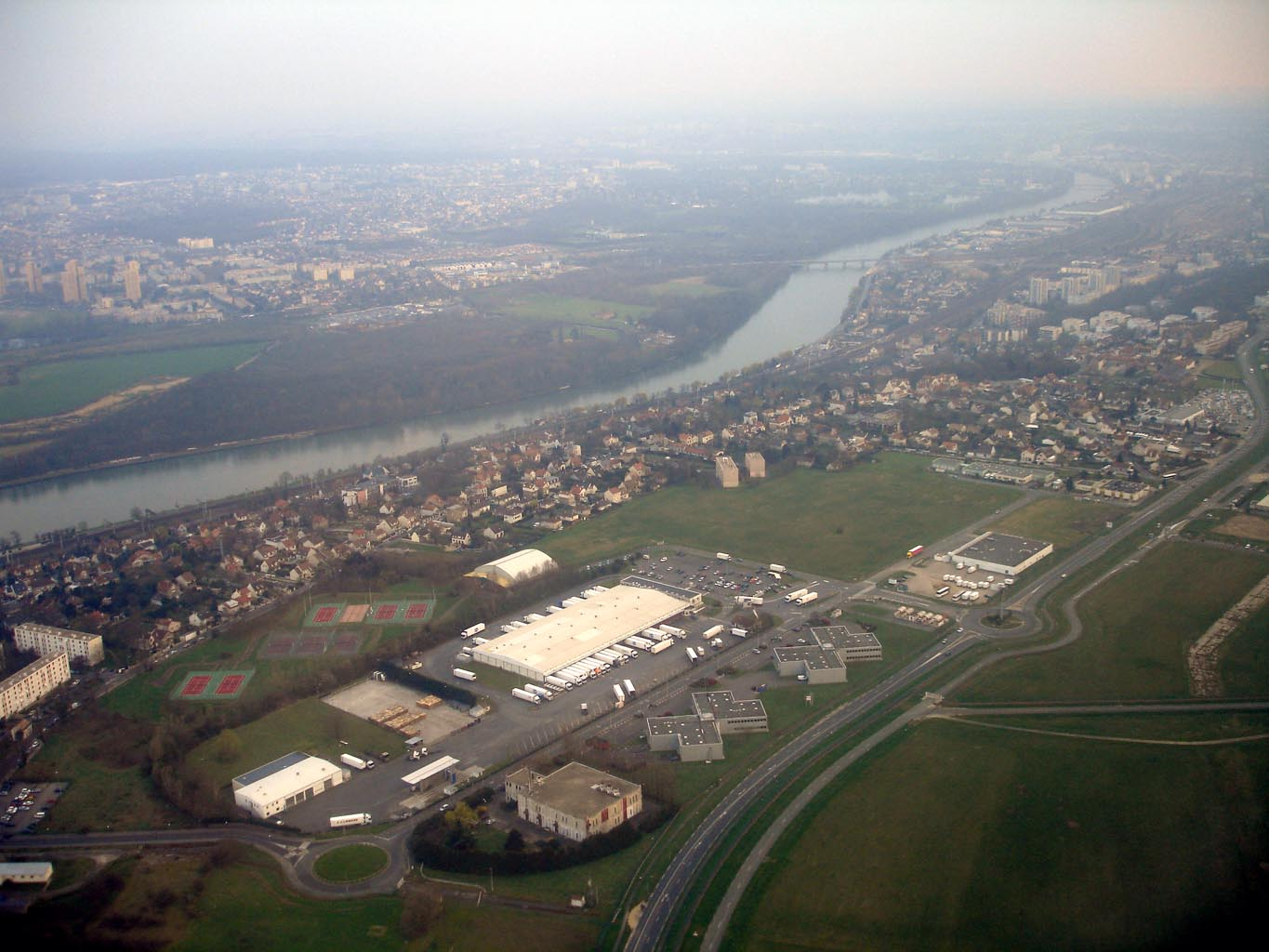
- An aerial view of Athis-Mons

- Coat of arms

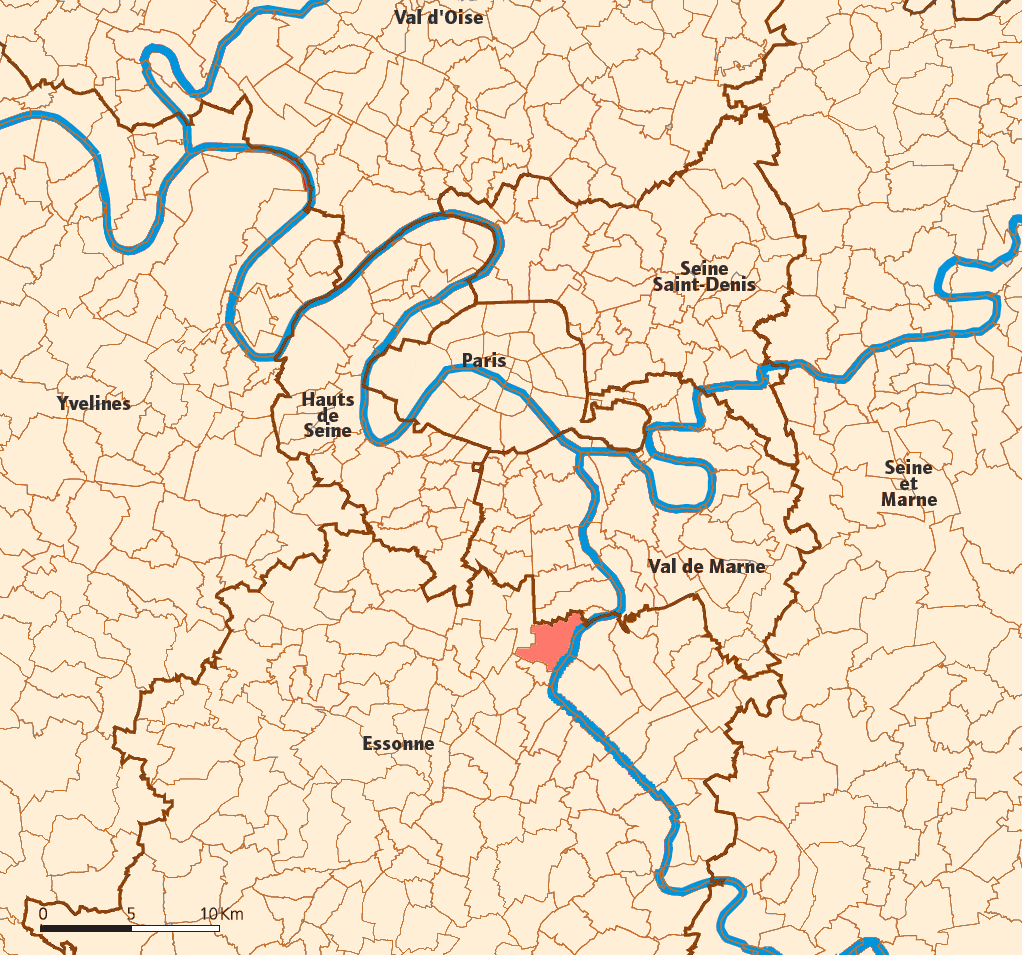
- Location (in red) within Paris inner and outer suburbs
- Location of Athis-Mons
- Location within France Location within Île-de-France (region)
- Coordinates: 48°42′27″N 2°23′20″E
- Country: France
- Region: Île-de-France
- Department: Essonne
- Arrondissement: Palaiseau
- Canton: Athis-Mons
- Intercommunality: Grand Paris; EPT Grand-Orly Seine Bièvre

Government
  - Mayor (2020–2026): Jean-Jacques Grousseau
- Area^{1}: 8.56 km^{2} (3.31 sq mi)
- Elevation: 81 m (266 ft)
- Highest elevation: 92 m (302 ft)
- Lowest elevation: 32 m (105 ft)
- Population (2023): 36,613
  - Density: 4,280/km^{2} (11,100/sq mi)
- Time zone: UTC+01:00 (CET)
  - Summer (DST): UTC+02:00 (CEST)
- INSEE/Postal code: 91027 /91200
- ^{1} French Land Register data, which excludes lakes, ponds, glaciers > 1 km^{2} (0.386 sq mi or 247 acres) and river estuaries.

Athis-Mons (French: [atisˈmɔ̃s]) is a commune in the southern suburbs of Paris, France. It is located 16.5 km (10.3 mi) from the center of Paris.

A small part of Orly International Airport lies on the territory of the commune of Athis-Mons, as do several of the hotels that serve the airport.

== History ==
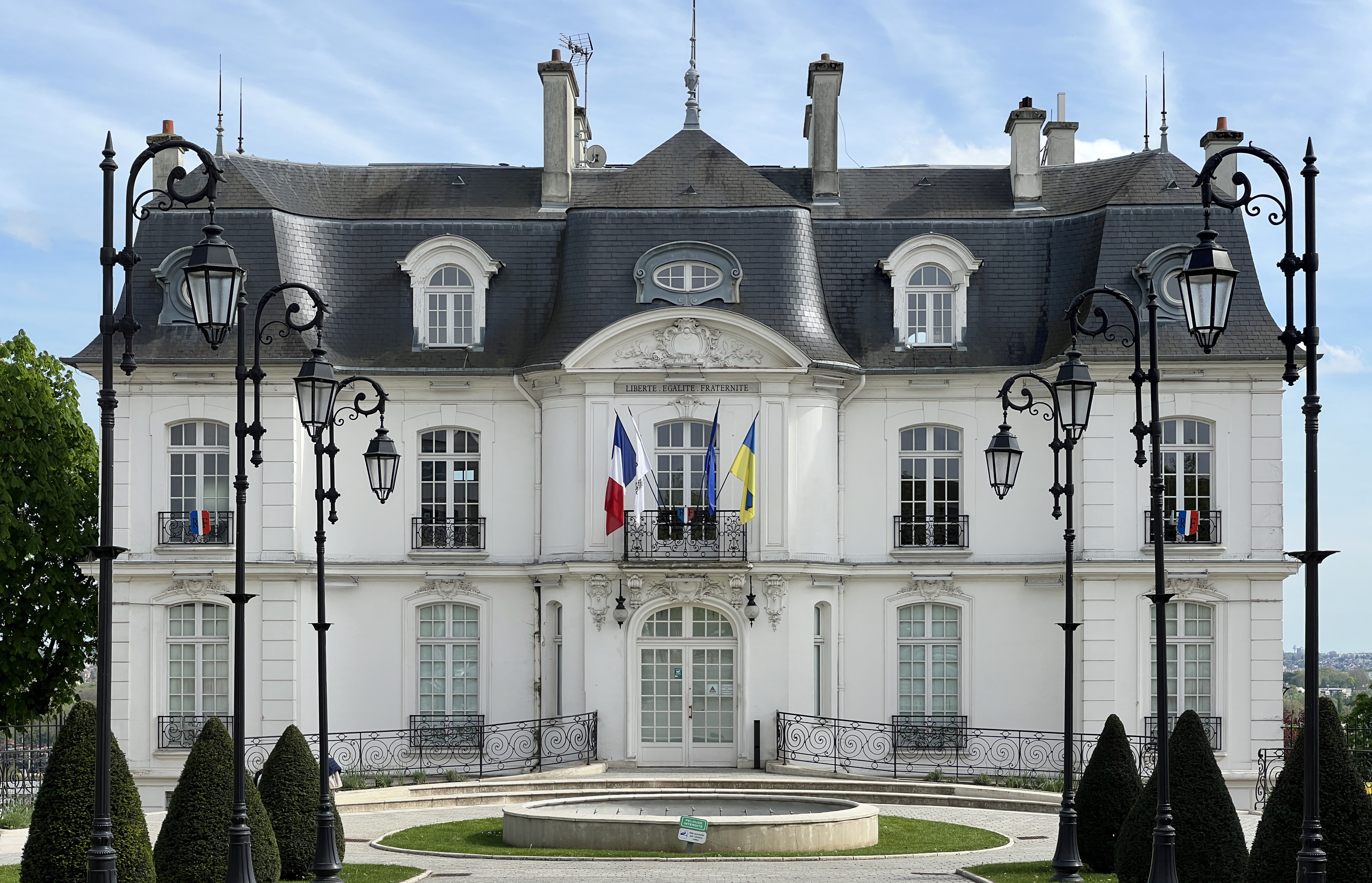
The Hôtel de Ville

Athis-Mons was formed in 1817 by joining two villages, Athis (along the Seine, and formerly known as Athis-sur-Orge) and Mons (on the adjacent plateau). Nowadays the lower area of the commune is commonly called Athis-Val. The Hôtel de Ville was built as a private house in 1893.

During World War II, a significant portion (approximately 80%) of Athis-Mons was destroyed during the Allied bombing raid of 18 April 1944. Approximately 300 people died and 4,000 people were left homeless. Athis-Mons had to be entirely rebuilt after the war.

== Population ==
Inhabitants are called Athégiens in French.

Historical population

Year	Pop.	±% p.a.
1793	338	—
1800	423	+3.26%
1806	435	+0.47%
1821	690	+3.12%
1831	690	+0.00%
1836	724	+0.97%
1841	705	−0.53%
1846	803	+2.64%
1851	771	−0.81%
1856	788	+0.44%
1861	780	−0.20%
1866	854	+1.83%
1872	910	+1.06%
1876	976	+1.77%
1881	1,038	+1.24%
1886	1,333	+5.13%
1891	1,591	+3.60%
1896	2,027	+4.96%
1901	2,612	+5.20%

Year	Pop.	±% p.a.
1906	3,494	+5.99%
1911	4,627	+5.78%
1921	6,116	+2.83%
1926	7,969	+5.44%
1931	10,033	+4.71%
1936	10,962	+1.79%
1946	8,414	−2.61%
1954	14,120	+6.69%
1962	24,004	+6.86%
1968	27,640	+2.38%
1975	30,737	+1.53%
1982	28,496	−1.08%
1990	29,123	+0.27%
1999	29,427	+0.12%
2007	30,462	+0.43%
2012	29,482	−0.65%
2017	34,347	+3.10%
2023	36,613	+1.07%

Source: EHESS and INSEE (1968-2023)

== Geography ==
Athis-Mons is located at the confluence of Orge and Seine rivers, and at the southern edge of the international airport of Orly.

=== Climate ===
Athis-Mons has an oceanic climate (Köppen climate classification Cfb). The average annual temperature in Athis-Mons is 12.1 °C (53.8 °F). The average annual rainfall is 622.2 mm (24.50 in) with May as the wettest month. The temperatures are highest on average in July, at around 20.4 °C (68.7 °F), and lowest in January, at around 4.7 °C (40.5 °F). The highest temperature ever recorded in Athis-Mons was 41.9 °C (107.4 °F) on 25 July 2019; the coldest temperature ever recorded was −16.8 °C (1.8 °F) on 17 January 1985.

Comparison of local Meteorological data with other cities in France
Town	Sunshine (hours/yr)	Rain (mm/yr)	Snow (days/yr)	Storm (days/yr)	Fog (days/yr)
National average	1,973	770	14	22	40
Athis-Mons	1,831	615.4	15.1	21.7	28.1
Paris	1,661	637	12	18	10
Nice	2,724	767	1	29	1
Strasbourg	1,693	665	29	29	56
Brest	1,605	1,211	7	12	75

Climate data for Athis-Mons (Orly Airport, altitude 49m, 1991–2020 normals, extremes 1921–present)
Month	Jan	Feb	Mar	Apr	May	Jun	Jul	Aug	Sep	Oct	Nov	Dec	Year
Record high °C (°F)	16.5 (61.7)	20.8 (69.4)	25.3 (77.5)	29.4 (84.9)	35.0 (95.0)	37.1 (98.8)	41.9 (107.4)	40.0 (104.0)	34.4 (93.9)	31.3 (88.3)	21.8 (71.2)	17.3 (63.1)	41.9 (107.4)
Mean daily maximum °C (°F)	7.2 (45.0)	8.5 (47.3)	12.5 (54.5)	16.2 (61.2)	19.8 (67.6)	23.2 (73.8)	25.8 (78.4)	25.7 (78.3)	21.5 (70.7)	16.4 (61.5)	10.9 (51.6)	7.6 (45.7)	16.3 (61.3)
Daily mean °C (°F)	4.7 (40.5)	5.2 (41.4)	8.3 (46.9)	11.3 (52.3)	14.8 (58.6)	18.2 (64.8)	20.4 (68.7)	20.2 (68.4)	16.5 (61.7)	12.6 (54.7)	7.9 (46.2)	5.2 (41.4)	12.1 (53.8)
Mean daily minimum °C (°F)	2.1 (35.8)	2.0 (35.6)	4.2 (39.6)	6.4 (43.5)	9.9 (49.8)	13.1 (55.6)	15.0 (59.0)	14.6 (58.3)	11.5 (52.7)	8.7 (47.7)	5.0 (41.0)	2.7 (36.9)	7.9 (46.2)
Record low °C (°F)	−16.8 (1.8)	−15.0 (5.0)	−9.4 (15.1)	−4.3 (24.3)	−1.3 (29.7)	3.1 (37.6)	6.7 (44.1)	5.6 (42.1)	1.7 (35.1)	−3.9 (25.0)	−9.6 (14.7)	−13.3 (8.1)	−16.8 (1.8)
Average precipitation mm (inches)	46.8 (1.84)	42.6 (1.68)	44.4 (1.75)	44.5 (1.75)	63.0 (2.48)	56.1 (2.21)	52.9 (2.08)	57.9 (2.28)	47.4 (1.87)	52.8 (2.08)	53.4 (2.10)	60.4 (2.38)	622.2 (24.50)
Average precipitation days (≥ 1.0 mm)	10.5	9.0	8.9	8.6	9.5	8.4	7.0	7.7	7.7	9.3	10.3	11.6	108.6
Average snowy days	3.6	4.3	2.0	0.4	0	0	0	0	0	0.1	0.6	2.3	13.2
Mean monthly sunshine hours	53.3	85.2	152.9	202.5	217.0	224.3	246.9	220.9	185.7	116.6	62.4	63.9	1,831.3
Source: Météo-France

== Administration ==
The canton of Athis-Mons has 2 communes (the other is Paray-Vieille-Poste) and 36,615 inhabitants. Athis-Mons is a twin town of Ballina in Ireland.

== Transport ==
Athis-Mons is served by Athis-Mons station on Paris RER line C.

== Education ==
The commune has nine preschools (écoles maternelles) and eight elementary schools (écoles élémentaires).

- Preschools: Albert Calmette, Jules Ferry, Jean de la Fontaine, Pauline Kergomard, La Rougette, Charles Perrault, Jacques Prévert, Antoine de Saint-Exupéry,
- Elementary schools: Édouard Branly, Pierre et Marie Curie, Jules Ferry, Camille Flammarion, Jean Jaurès, Louis Pasteur, Antoine de Saint-Exupéry
- Combined preschools and elementary schools: Jean-Baptiste de la Salle

There is a private Catholic school, Groupe scolaire Saint-Charles d'Athis-Mons.

== Museum ==
The city hosts the aviation museum Musée Delta.

== Twin towns – sister cities ==
Athis-Mons is twinned with:

- (Republic of Ireland) Ballina, Ireland
- Rothenburg ob der Tauber, Germany
- Sinaia, Romania

== See also ==
- Communes of the Essonne department
