= Fabien Leclercq =

French footballer (born 1972)

Personal information
- Date of birth: 19 October 1972 (age 54)
- Place of birth: Lille, France
- Height: 1.80 m (5 ft 11 in)
- Position: Defender

Senior career*
Years	Team	Apps	(Gls)
1989–1999	Lille OSC		
1999–2000	Heart of Midlothian F.C.		
2000–2001	AS Cannes		
2001–2005	ASOA Valence		
2005–2006	FC Sète		
2006–2008	Gap FC		
- * Club domestic league appearances and goals

Fabien Leclercq (born 19 October 1972) is a French football player. He currently plays at Gap FC.
