= Jean-Marie Dallet (linguist) =

Jean-Marie Dallet (November 21, 1909 – August 3, 1972) was a White Father and a linguist specialized in Berber studies, particularly in the Kabyle language.

Coming from the Cantal and having worked in the diocese of Angers before joining the White Fathers, Jean-Marie Dallet joined Jacques Lanfry in Larbaâ Nath Irathen (ex Fort National) in 1934, where he spent the rest of his life. He developed an early interest in Berber languages and culture and began to study the Kabyle language.

From 1946 until his death in 1972, he served as the director of the Fichier de documentation berbère, a specialized periodical publication dedicated to Berber studies. He also authored several works on the Kabyle language, including a Kabyle-French dictionary published posthumously.

== Bibliography ==
- Initiation à la langue berbère (Kabylie), FDB Fort National, 1960.
- Les cahiers de Belaid ou la Kabylie d'Antan, FDB Fort National, 1963.
- Contes Kabyles inédits , FDB Fort National, 1967
- Dictionnaire Kabyle-Français, SELAF - Societe d'Etudes Linguistiques et Anthropologiques de France, 1982 ISBN 2852971437.
- Dictionnaire Francais-Kabyle, Parler Des at Mangellat (Algérie), SELAF - Societe d'Etudes Linguistiques et Anthropologiques de France, 1985.
