= Sébastien Dallet =

French professional football player (born 1973)

Sebastien Dallet
Personal information
- Date of birth: 30 September 1973 (age 53)
- Place of birth: Bourges, France
- Height: 1.68 m (5 ft 6 in)
- Position: Striker

Senior career*
Years	Team	Apps	(Gls)
1991–1997	RC Lens		
1995–1996	→ Guingamp (loan)		
1997–2000	Sochaux		
2000–2003	Créteil		
2003–2007	Troyes AC	75	(19)
- * Club domestic league appearances and goals as of 2006-10-03

Sebastien Dallet (born 30 September 1973) is a French professional association football player, currently with Troyes AC.

Dallet is a striker and lists US Orléans, RC Lens, Guingamp, Sochaux and Créteil as his former clubs.
