= Claude-Arnaud Rivenet =

French footballer (born 1972)

Personal information
- Date of birth: 13 December 1972 (age 53)
- Place of birth: Lille, France
- Height: 1.84 m (6 ft 0 in)
- Position: Forward

Senior career*
Years	Team	Apps	(Gls)
1989–1991	Lyon B		
1991–1997	Lyon	72	(4)
1996–1997	→ Gueugnon (loan)	27	(6)
1997–1999	Troyes	64	(18)
1999–2001	Amiens	34	(9)
2001–2002	La Louvière	27	(4)
2002–2003	Mons	37	(2)
2003–2004	Kortrijk		
2004–2005	Saint-Priest	9	(1)
Total		270	(44)
- * Club domestic league appearances and goals

Claude-Arnaud Rivenet (born 13 December 1972) is a French former professional footballer who played as a forward.

== Career ==
Born in Lille, Rivenet played for Lyon B, Lyon, Gueugnon, Troyes, Amiens, La Louvière, Mons, Kortrijk and Saint-Priest.

After retiring as a player, Rivenet began working for OL TV.
