= Prince Mendy =

Senegalese footballer (born 1994)

Jules Mendy
Personal information
- Full name: Jules François Roger Joseph Mendy
- Date of birth: 14 November 1994 (age 31)
- Place of birth: Boutoupa, Senegal
- Height: 1.90 m (6 ft 3 in)
- Position: Defender

Youth career
- 2002–2010: Les Pennes Mirabeau
- 2010: Sochaux
- 2010–2011: Cannes
- 2011–2012: FC Bel Air
- 2012–2014: Marseille

Senior career*
| Years | Team | Apps | (Gls) |
| 2014–2015 | Fréjus Saint-Raphaël | 1 | (0) |
| 2015–2017 | GS Consolat | 40 | (5) |
| 2017–2020 | Quevilly-Rouen | 54 | (0) |
| 2017–2018 | Quevilly-Rouen | 10 | (0) |
| 2020–2021 | Laval | 27 | (0) |
| 2021–2022 | Vilafranquense | 27 | (1) |
| 2022–2024 | Nancy | 59 | (0) |
| 2024–2025 | Al-Fujairah | | |
| 2025–2026 | Sochaux | 4 | (0) |
| 2025–2026 | Sochaux B | 5 | (0) |
- * Club domestic league appearances and goals as of 23 June 2026

Jules François Roger Joseph Mendy (born 14 November 1994), known as Prince Mendy, is a Senegalese professional footballer who plays as a defender.

== Career ==
Mendy began his career with Marseille, and played for one season with their B team in Championnat de France Amateur 2. He spent three seasons in Championnat National with Fréjus Saint-Raphaël and GS Consolat. He signed for newly promoted Ligue 2 side Quevilly-Rouen in July 2017.

Mendy made his professional debut for Quevilly-Rouen in a Ligue 2 1–1 tie with Lorient on 29 July 2017.

After three seasons with Quevilly-Rouen, Mendy signed for Laval on an initial one-year contract, with a second year subject to the club achieving promotion.

On 1 July 2022, Mendy signed a two-year contract with Nancy.
