= Serge Blanc (footballer) =

French footballer (born 1972)

Personal information
- Date of birth: 22 September 1972 (age 54)
- Place of birth: Lyon, France
- Height: 1.82 m (6 ft 0 in)
- Position: Defender

Senior career*
Years	Team	Apps	(Gls)
1991–1997	Montpellier	136	(3)
1997–1999	Marseille	37	(1)
1999–2002	Lyon	30	(2)
2001–2002	→ Montpellier (loan)	15	(0)
2002–2004	Montpellier	30	(0)
2004–2005	Montpellier B (CFA)	11	(0)

International career
199?–1994	France U-21 / Olympic		
- * Club domestic league appearances and goals

Serge Blanc (born 22 September 1972) is a French former professional footballer who played as a defender.

== Honours ==
Montpellier

- Coupe de la Ligue: 1991–92
