= Arsène Roux =

French Arabist and Berberologist (1893–1971)

Arsène Roux (February 5, 1893 in Rochegude – July 19, 1971) was a French Arabist and Berberologist. He was born in Rochegude and emigrated to Morocco (then occupied by France) in his early twenties where he started studying Classical Arabic, Moroccan Arabic and the Moroccan Berber languages. In the following years, he worked in various schools and universities as a professor and director; he also founded and presided over the Collège d'Azrou.

During his time in Morocco he collected and studied an enormous amount of Shilha and Central Atlas Tamazight texts and manuscripts with the help of his Berber assistant Si Ibrahim al-Kunki (b. 1905). Some of these texts were published by himself in Rabat for use in his Shilha Berber courses (e.g. Roux 1942); the majority however was taken to France upon his return there in the middle of the 1950s, where he continued his studies and he set out to correct, index and translate his collection of texts. Somehow, nothing of his extensive scholarly work actually saw publication except for a two-page summary of a lecture (Roux, 1948). He also worked together with the egyptologist Bruno Stricker on an edition and translation of Baḥr ad-dumu (Ocean of Tears), by Muḥammad Awzal, which was published in 1960.

After his death in 1971 his descendants donated his library to the Institut de Recherches méditerranéennes in Aix-en-Provence, where the Fonds Arsène Roux is still administered today. It contains more than two hundred Sous Berber manuscript texts, some Arabic manuscripts and an extensive collection of riddles, proverbs, tales, and religious legends written down by Roux himself. A catalogue of the Arabic and Berber manuscripts has been prepared by van den Boogert (1995), while the other texts have been indexed in Stroomer & Peyron (2003).

== Bibliography and references ==
- Boogert, N. van den (1995). Catalogue des manuscrits arabes et berbères du Fonds Roux: Travaux et documents de l'Iremam, 18. Aix-en-Provence: Iremam.
- Boogert, Nico van den (1997). Berber Literary Tradition of the Sous — with an edition and translation of 'The Ocean of Tears' by Muḥammad Awzal (d. 1749). (De Goeje Fund, Vol. XXVII) Leiden: NINO.
- Roux, Arsène (1942). Récits, contes et légendes berbères en Tachelhiyt. Rabat: ?.
- Roux, Arsène (1949). "Quelques manuscrits berbères en caractères arabes". Actes du XXIème Congrès International des Orientalistes (Paris 1948). Paris: Société Asiatique: 316–317.
- Roux, Arsène (1955). La vie berbère par les textes. Parlers du Sud-Ouest marocain (tachelhit). Première partie : la vie matérielle. I. Textes. Paris: ?.
- Roux, Arsène (1990). A. Bounfour (ed.). La poésie berbère populaire. Paris.
- Stroomer, Harry (2003). A Linguistic Reanalysis of "Récits, contes et légendes berbères en Tachelhiyt" by Arsène Roux with a Translation in English. Berber Studies vol. 5. Köln: Rüdiger Köppe.
- Arsène Roux and Michael Peyron, Poésies berbères de l’époque héroïque, Maroc central (1908–1932), Aix-en-Provence: Edisud 2002
- Stroomer, Harry; Peyron, Michael (2003). Catalogue des archives berbères du "Fonds Arsène Roux". Berber Studies. Vol. 6. Köln: Rüdiger Köppe.
