= 1976 in France =

- Decades: 1950s; 1960s; 1970s; 1980s; 1990s
- See also: History of France; Timeline of French history; List of years in France

Events from the year 1976 in France.

== Incumbents ==
- President: Valéry Giscard d'Estaing
- Prime Minister: Jacques Chirac (until 29 August), Raymond Barre (starting 29 August)

== Events ==
- 21 January – The first commercial Concorde flight takes off.
- 7 March – Cantonales Elections held.
- 14 March – Cantonales Elections held.
- 9 April – Peugeot takes over Citroen to form PSA Peugeot Citroen.
- 27 June – Palestinian extremists hijack an Air France plane in Greece with 246 passengers and 12 crew. They take it to Entebbe, Uganda.
- June – Launch of the Renault 14, a five-door small family hatchback with front-wheel drive which is similar in concept to the hugely successful Volkswagen Golf from West Germany.
- 4 July – Entebbe Raid: Israeli airborne commandos free 103 hostages being held by Palestinian hijackers of an Air France plane at Uganda's Entebbe Airport; 1 Israeli and several Ugandan soldiers are killed in the raid.
- 25 August – Resignation of Jacques Chirac as Prime Minister of France; he is succeeded by Raymond Barre.

== Sport ==
- 24 June – Tour de France begins.
- 18 July – Tour de France ends, won by Lucien Van Impe of Belgium.

== Births ==
=== January to March ===
- 2 January – Nicolas Goussé, soccer player.
- 17 January – Yohan Lachor, soccer player.
- 20 January – Lilian Jégou, cyclist.
- 20 January – Yann Pivois, cyclist.
- 22 January – Christophe Himmer, soccer player.
- 28 January – Pierrick Bourgeat, alpine skier.
- 31 January – Vincent Masingue, basketball player.
- 1 February – Julien Loy, triathlete.
- 2 February – Olivier Mutis, tennis player.
- 3 February – Stéphane Antiga, volleyball player.
- 7 February – Florent Brard, cyclist.
- 8 February – Nicolas Vouilloz, mountain biker and rally driver.
- 9 February – Walter Lapeyre, pistol shooter.
- 21 February – Richard Massolin, soccer player.
- 21 February – Armand Raimbault, soccer player.
- 22 February – Matthieu Louis-Jean, soccer player.
- 24 February – Romain Ferrier, soccer player.
- 25 February – Cyril Abidi, Kickboxing Champion and Muay Thai World Champion.
- 25 February – Sammy Traoré, soccer player.
- 26 February – Cédric Michaud, speed skater.
- 5 March – Stéphane Léoni, soccer player.
- 5 March – Samuel Plouhinec, cyclist.
- 6 March – Cédric Barbosa, soccer player.
- 6 March – Antoine Dénériaz, Alpine skier and Olympic gold medallist.
- 12 March – Julien Courbey, actor.
- 15 March – Sébastien Gondouin, soccer player.

=== April to June ===
- 2 April – Sébastien Fournier-Bidoz, alpine skier.
- 3 April – Nicolas Escudé, tennis player.
- 4 April – Sébastien Enjolras, motor racing driver (died 1997).
- 8 April – Gaston Curbelo, soccer player.
- 8 April – Sylvain Marconnet, rugby union player.
- 15 April – Christophe Dussart, soccer player.
- 16 April – Doriane Vidal, snowboarder and Olympic medallist.
- 17 April – Maïwenn Le Besco, actress.
- 10 May – Romain Barnier, swimmer.
- 15 May – Cyrille Thouvenin, actor.
- 17 May – Benjamin Delmas, ice dancer.
- 22 May – Ludovic Valbon, rugby union player.
- 17 June – Estelle Folest, politician
- 21 June – Alexandra Cousteau, environmentalist.
- 23 June – Patrick Vieira, international soccer player.
- 25 June – Sylvain N'Diaye, soccer player.

=== July to September ===
- 2 July – Laurent Lefèvre, cyclist.
- 9 July – Pascal Briand, speed skater.
- 10 July – Ludovic Giuly, soccer player.
- 16 July – Romain Haguenauer, ice dancer.
- 25 July – Stéphane Rideau, actor.
- 26 July – Alice Taglioni, actress
- 27 July – Singrid Campion, businesswoman and singer
- 2 August – Stéphane Pichot, soccer player.
- 7 August – Nicolas Brusque, rugby union player.
- 8 August – Olivier Monterrubio, soccer player.
- 9 August – Audrey Tautou, actress.
- 20 August – Anaïs Croze, singer.
- 22 August – Laurent Hernu, decathlete.
- 25 August – Céline Lebrun, judoka and Olympic medallist.
- 26 August – Sébastien Vieilledent, rower and Olympic gold medallist.
- 27 August – Benoît Poilvet, cyclist.
- 31 August – Vincent Delerm, singer-songwriter, pianist and composer.
- 31 August – Romain Larrieu, soccer player.
- 4 September – Lise Legrand, wrestler and Olympic medallist.
- 6 September – Laurent Carrasco, rugby league player.
- 6 September – Alain Raguel, soccer player.
- 7 September – Caroline Abadie, politician of Renaissance
- 9 September – Emma de Caunes, actress.
- 14 September – Lionel Nallet, rugby union player.
- 19 September – Marc Boutruche, soccer player.
- 19 September – Laurent Emmanuelli, rugby union player.
- 20 September – Frédéric Jay, soccer player.
- 29 September – Grégory Tafforeau, soccer player.

=== October to December ===
- 5 October – Alessandra Sublet, television host
- 6 October – Hubert Henno, volleyball player.
- 15 October – Cédric Bardon, soccer player.
- 22 October – Bérangère Abba, politician
- 24 October – David Recorbet, soccer player.
- 26 October – Ludovic Asuar, soccer player.
- 1 November – Ludovic Mercier, rugby union player.
- 3 November – Arnaud Labbe, cyclist.
- 11 November – Nicolas Gillet, soccer player.
- 15 November – Julien Lachuer, soccer player.
- 25 November – Grégory Havret, golfer.
- 27 November – David Abrard, swimmer.
- 1 December – Yoann Bouchard, soccer player.
- 6 December – Cédric Claverie, judoka.
- 7 December – Benoît Tréluyer, motor racing driver.
- 18 December – Pierre Ducrocq, soccer player.
- 19 December – Jacques-Olivier Paviot, soccer player.
- 20 December – Benoît August, rugby union player.
- 25 December – Cédric Berthelin, soccer player.
- 31 December – Frédérique Bangué, athlete.

== Deaths ==
=== January to June ===
- 8 January – Pierre Jean Jouve, poet and novelist (born 1887).
- 21 January – Joseph-Marie Martin, Cardinal (born 1891).
- 12 February – Charles Jourdan, fashion designer (born 1883).
- 20 February – René Cassin, jurist and judge, received the Nobel Peace Prize in 1968 (born 1887).
- 1 March – Jean Martinon, conductor and composer (born 1910).
- 3 March – Pierre Molinier, painter and photographer (born 1900).
- 8 March – Pauline de Rothschild, fashion icon and tastemaker (born 1908).
- 12 March – Jacques Carlu, architect and designer (born 1890).
- 19 March – Albert Dieudonné, actor, screenwriter, film director and novelist (born 1889).
- 1 April – Roger Rivière, cyclist (born 1936).
- 24 April – Ferdinand Le Drogo, cyclist (born 1903).
- 31 May – Jacques Monod, biologist, awarded Nobel Prize in Physiology or Medicine in 1965 (born 1910).
- 5 June – Jean de Limur, film director (born 1887).
- 27 June – Albert Dubout, cartoonist, illustrator, painter, and sculptor (born 1905).

=== July to December ===
- 11 July – Charles Ritz, hotelier and fly fisherman (born 1891).
- 24 July – Paul Morand, author (born 1888).
- 27 July – Lucien Rosengart, engineer (born 1881).
- 13 August – Martial Guéroult, philosopher and historian of philosophy (born 1891).
- 27 August – Georges Marrane, politician (born 1888).
- 1 September – Jules Merviel, cyclist (born 1909).
- 24 September – Achille Souchard, cyclist (born 1900).
- 3 October – Émile Benveniste, structural linguist (born 1902).
- 11 October — Werner Haas (pianist), German pianist (born 1931)
- 18 October – Janine Micheau, lyric soprano opera singer (born 1914).
- 21 October – Jean Berveiller, composer and organist (born 1904).
- 25 October – Raymond Queneau, poet and novelist (born 1903).
- 5 November – Pierre Garat, civil servant in Vichy France (born 1919).
- 15 November – Jean Gabin, actor (born 1904).
- 23 November – André Malraux, author, adventurer and statesman (born 1901).
- 17 December – Marie-Laurence Quatrefages, politician and Righteous Among the Nations (born 1896)
- 24 December – Jean de Broglie, politician, assassinated (born 1921).
- 28 December – Pierre La Mure, author (born 1899).

=== Full date unknown ===
- René Herse, bicycle constructor (born 1913).
- Robert Louzon, engineer, revolutionary syndicalist, anarchist and socialist (born 1882).
- François Ozenda, painter (born 1923).
- Henriette Sauret, feminist, author, pacifist, journalist (born 1890).

== See also ==
- List of French films of 1976
