= 1978 in France =

- Decades: 1950s; 1960s; 1970s; 1980s; 1990s
- See also: History of France; Timeline of French history; List of years in France

Events from the year 1978 in France.

== Incumbents ==
- President: Valéry Giscard d'Estaing
- Prime Minister: Raymond Barre

== Events ==
- February – Launch of the Horizon front-wheel drive hatchback by Chrysler Europe, which will be built in France as a Simca and sold in Britain as a Talbot.
- 1 February – Hollywood film director Roman Polanski skips bail and flees to France, after pleading guilty to charges of engaging in sex with a 13-year-old girl.
- 12 March – Legislative Election held.
- 19 March – Legislative Election held.
- April – Launch of the Renault 18 saloon and estates, replacement for the Renault 12.
- 4 May – Communist activist Henri Curiel is murdered in Paris.
- 10 May – Two years after buying Citroën, carmaker Peugeot makes another takeover by purchasing the European operations of American car giant Chrysler, owners of the French Simca and British Chrysler brands.
- 16 May – Amoco Cadiz runs aground off the coast of Brittany, split in two and spilled 68.7 million US gallons (260,000 m^{3}) of oil.
- 18–19 May – Belgian and French paratroopers fly to Zaire to aid the fight against the rebels.
- 27 May – Brittany Ferries inaugurate a regular service between Roscoff and Cork in the Republic of Ireland.
- 26 June – Bombing by Breton nationalists causes destruction in Palace of Versailles.
- December – The Simca Horizon is voted European Car of the Year.
- 31 December – Disappearance of Danielle Judic.
- unknown date – The Trâ Armânami Association of French Aromanians is founded.

== Births ==
=== January to March ===
- 5 January – Franck Montagny, motor racing driver.
- 6 January – Renaud Dion, cyclist.
- 11 January – Stéphane Morisot, soccer player.
- 14 January – Éric Sitruk, soccer player.
- 17 January
  - Stéphane Pasquier, jockey.
  - Aboubacar Sankhare, soccer player.
- 21 January – David Coulibaly, soccer player.
- 30 January – Sébastien Sansoni, soccer player.
- 7 February – Nicolas Ardouin, soccer player.
- 8 February – Loïc Jean-Albert, parachuter.
- 11 February – Aurélien Cologni, rugby league player.
- 16 February – Nicolas Florentin, soccer player.
- 26 February – Stéphane Bonnes, soccer player.
- 28 February – Jeanne Cherhal, singer-songwriter
- 5 March – Stéphane Martine, soccer player.
- 13 March – Faustine Merret, windsurfer and Olympic gold medallist.
- 22 March – Arnaud Le Lan, soccer player.
- 26 March – Cédric Mouret, soccer player.
- 27 March – Amélie Cocheteux, tennis player.
- 28 March – Fabien Audard, soccer player.
- 30 March – Édouard Cissé, soccer player.
- 31 March – Jérôme Rothen, international soccer player.

=== April to June ===
- 5 April – Boussad Houche, soccer player.
- 5 April – Arnaud Tournant, cyclist.
- 8 April – Mathieu Assou-Ekotto, soccer player.
- 11 April – David Ducourtioux, soccer player.
- 2 May – Didier Domi, soccer player.
- 5 May – Bruno Cheyrou, soccer player.
- 6 May – Tony Estanguet, canoeist
- 11 May – Laetitia Casta, supermodel and actress.
- 15 May – Sébastien Chabbert, soccer player.
- 15 May – Yohan Demont, soccer player.
- 27 May – Jacques Abardonado, soccer player.
- 29 May – Sébastien Grosjean, tennis player.
- 2 June – Nicolas Bal, Nordic combined skier and Olympic medallist.
- 6 June – Faudel, singer.
- 11 June – Julien Rodriguez, soccer player.
- 15 June – Jérôme Moïso, basketball player.
- 17 June – Isabelle Delobel, ice dancer.
- 17 June – Véronique Delobel, ice dancer.
- 23 June – Frédéric Leclercq, bassist.
- 28 June – Clarisse Albrecht, singer-songwriter, actress and former model

=== July to September ===
- 17 July – Émilie Simon, singer and composer.
- 18 July – Mélissa Theuriau, journalist and news anchor.
- 20 July – Cédric Heymans, rugby union player.
- 26 July – Matthieu Bataille, judoka.
- 28 July – Yannick Jauzion, rugby union player.
- 29 July – Julien Laharrague, rugby union player.
- 4 August – Emmanuelle Boidron, actress.
- 7 August – Alexandre Aja, film director.
- 8 August – Louis Saha, association football player
- 9 August – Audrey Tautou, actress.
- 14 August – Pascal Delhommeau, soccer player.
- 19 August – François Modesto, soccer player.
- 19 August – Sebastien Tortelli, twice World Champion motocross racer.
- 27 August – Franck Queudrue, soccer player.
- 29 August – Yves Deroff, soccer player.
- 31 August – Philippe Christanval, soccer player.
- 1 September – Coralie Clément, singer.
- 9 September – Alioune Touré, soccer player.
- 11 September – Laurent Courtois, soccer player.
- 13 September – Sonia Huguet, cyclist.
- 20 September – Julien Bonnaire, rugby union player.
- 23 September – Frédéric Daquin, soccer player.
- 23 September – Ingrid Jacquemod, alpine skier.
- 27 September – Jean-Joël Perrier-Doumbé, soccer player.

=== October to December ===
- 5 October – Fabien Boudarène, soccer player.
- 29 October – Jérôme Guisset, rugby league player.
- 22 November – Mélanie Doutey, actress.
- 28 November – Denis Flahaut, cyclist.
- 7 December – Jean Bouilhou, rugby union player.
- 10 December – Grégory Proment, soccer player.
- 11 December – Eric Borel, spree killer (died 1995).
- 16 December – Sylvain Distin, soccer player.

=== Full date unknown ===
- Valérie Crunchant, actress.
- Damien Luce, pianist.

== Deaths ==
=== January to April ===
- 8 January – André François-Poncet, politician and diplomat (born 1887).
- 16 January – Jean Gounot, gymnast and Olympic medallist (born 1894).
- 22 January – Léon Damas, poet and politician (born 1912).
- 24 January – Georges Perros, writer (born 1923).
- 31 January – Marie-Louise Damien, singer and actress (born 1889).
- 24 February – Georges Bénézé, philosopher (born 1888).
- 2 March – Alix Combelle, swing jazz tenor saxophonist, clarinetist and bandleader (born 1912).
- 11 March – Hélène Bouvier, operatic mezzo-soprano (born 1905).
- 11 March – Claude François, singer and songwriter (born 1939).
- 15 March – Jacques Forestier, rheumatologist (born 1890).
- 18 March – François Duprat, negationist writer (born 1941).
- 19 March – Gaston Julia, mathematician (born 1893).
- 20 March – Jacques Brugnon, tennis player (born 1895).
- 23 April – Jacques Rueff, economist and adviser to the French Government (born 1896).
- 29 April – Robert Debré, physician (born 1882).

=== May to December ===
- 4 May – Henri Curiel, political activist, assassinated (born 1914).
- 14 May – Henri Chapron, automobile coachbuilder (born 1886).
- 24 June – Robert Charroux, writer (born 1909).
- 14 July – Gaston Ragueneau, athlete and Olympic medallist (born 1881).
- 22 July – André Chapelon, mechanical engineer and designer of steam locomotives (born 1892).
- 23 July – Danielle Collobert, author, poet and journalist (born 1940).
- 25 August – Olivier Hussenot, actor (born 1913).
- 26 August – Charles Boyer, actor (born 1899).
- 6 September – Max Décugis, tennis player (born 1882).
- 8 September – Jean Nicolas, international soccer player (born 1913).
- 19 September – Étienne Gilson, Thomistic philosopher and historian of philosophy (born 1884).
- 16 November – Claude Dauphin, actor (born 1903).
- 5 December – Bernard Faÿ, historian (born 1893).
- 21 December – Roger Caillois, writer and intellectual (born 1913).

=== Full date unknown ===
- Camille Le Mercier d'Erm, poet, historian and Breton nationalist (born 1888).
