= 1974 in France =

- Decades: 1950s; 1960s; 1970s; 1980s; 1990s
- See also: History of France; Timeline of French history; List of years in France

Events from the year 1974 in France.

== Incumbents ==
- President:
  - until 2 April: Georges Pompidou
  - 2 April-27 May: Alain Poher
  - starting 27 May: Valéry Giscard d'Estaing
- Prime Minister: Pierre Messmer (until 27 May), Jacques Chirac (starting 27 May)

== Events ==
- 1 March – Pierre Messmer finishes his first term as Prime Minister of France.
- 3 March – Turkish Airlines Flight 981 a McDonnell Douglas DC-10 crashes into the Ermenville Forest just outside Senlis killing all 346 on board.
- 8 March – Charles de Gaulle Airport opens in Paris.
- 2 April – President Georges Pompidou dies in office. Senate President Alain Poher becomes Acting President for the second time.
- 7 August – French acrobat Philippe Petit walks across a high wire slung between the twin towers of the World Trade Center in New York City.
- 28 August – The Citroen CX, top model in the Citroen range, is launched – succeeding the 19-year-old DS. It is voted European Car of the Year.
- 12 September – The crew of the SS France (1961) take over the ship off Le Havre in an unsuccessful attempt to prevent her withdrawal; she never sails under the French flag again.
- 9 December – The Paris summit, reuniting the European communities' heads of state and government, commences.

== Sport ==
- 27 June – Tour de France begins.
- 21 July – Tour de France ends, won by Eddy Merckx of Belgium.

== Births ==
=== January to March ===
- 6 January – Romain Sardou, novelist.
- 13 January – Thierry Debès, soccer player.
- 16 January – Frédéric Dindeleux, soccer player.
- 20 January – Florian Maurice, soccer player.
- 21 January – Ulrich Le Pen, soccer player.
- 23 January – Bernard Diomède, soccer player.
- 3 February – Florian Rousseau, cyclist and Olympic gold medallist.
- 6 February – Sébastien Delagrange, golfer.
- 8 February – Guy-Manuel de Homem-Christo, musician.
- 10 February – Lionel Potillon, soccer player.
- 11 February – Sébastien Hinault, cyclist.
- February 13 – The Roc'h Trédudon attack, in Brittany.
- 17 February – Frédéric Bolley, twice motocross world champion.
- 20 February – Ophélie Winter, singer and actress.
- 23 February – Stéphane Bernadis, figure skater.
- 26 February – Sébastien Loeb, rally driver and three time World Champion.
- 17 March – Franck Bouyer, cyclist.
- 21 March – Sébastien Gimenez, soccer player.
- 31 March – Patrick Regnault, soccer player.

=== April to June ===
- 1 April – Cyril Raffaelli, traceur, martial artist and stuntman.
- 7 April – Julien Boutter, tennis player.
- 11 April – Franck Rénier, cyclist.
- 18 April – Olivier Besancenot, politician.
- 29 April – Pascal Cygan, soccer player.
- 8 May – Raphaël Jacquelin, golfer.
- 9 May – Benoît Salmon, cyclist.
- 10 May – Sylvain Wiltord, international soccer player.
- 11 May – Benoît Magimel, actor.
- 14 May – Pierre-Yves André, soccer player.
- 24 May – Florence Baverel-Robert, biathlete.
- 28 May – Romain Duris, actor.
- 1 June – Jérôme Vareille, soccer player.
- 10 June – Christophe Bassons, cyclist.
- 13 June
  - Frédéric Bourdin, serial imposter.
  - Claire-Marie Le Guay, classical pianist.

=== July to September ===
- 7 July – Doc Gynéco, hip hop artist.
- 10 July – Nassim Akrour, soccer player.
- 13 July – Ronan Le Crom, soccer player.
- 21 July – Frédéric Biancalani, soccer player.
- 22 July - Pierrick Boyer, pastry chef.
- 4 August
  - Jean-Christophe Rouvière, soccer player.
  - Thierry Thulliez, jockey.
- 5 August – Antoine Sibierski, soccer player.
- 7 August – Yohann Bernard, swimmer.
- 9 August – Raphaël Poirée, biathlete.
- 11 August – Audrey Mestre, free-diver (died 2002).
- 26 August – Sébastien Bruno, rugby union player.
- 3 September – Didier André, motor racing driver.
- 4 September – Jean-Pierre Simb, soccer player.
- 12 September – Caroline Aigle, first woman fighter pilot in the French Air Force (died 2007).
- 16 September – Frédéric Da Rocha, soccer player.
- 25 September – Olivier Dacourt, soccer player.
- 28 September – Frédéric Danjou, soccer player.
- September – Justine Lévy, author.

=== October to December ===
- 7 October – Hervé Alicarte, soccer player.
- 19 October – Laurent Brancowitz, guitarist.
- 21 October – Olivier Azam, rugby union player.
- 1 November – Renan Lavigne, squash player.
- 4 November – Jérôme Leroy, soccer player.
- 11 November – Bettina Goislard, United Nations worker (died 2003).
- 20 November – Alain Andji, pole vaulter.
- 27 November – Yann Le Pennec, slalom canoer.
- 28 November – Pascal Bedrossian, soccer player.
- 29 November – Cyril Dessel, cyclist.
- 30 November – Arnaud Vincent, motorcycle road racer.
- 6 December
  - Stéphane Augé, cyclist.
  - Delphine Combe, athlete.
- 9 December – Emmanuel Thibault, dancer.
- 11 December – Julien Robert, biathlete.
- 13 December – Richard Dourthe, rugby union player.
- 17 December – Yannick Fischer, soccer player.
- 22 December – Éric Despezelle, judoka.

=== Full date unknown ===
- Thierry Bernard-Gotteland, French artist.
- Amelie Chabannes, painter and sculptor.
- Stéphane Michon, Nordic combined skier.

== Deaths ==
=== January to June ===
- 21 January – Arnaud Denjoy, mathematician (born 1884).
- 30 January – Fernand Arnout, weightlifter and Olympic medallist (born 1899).
- 13 March – Henri Pequet, pilot, flew first official airmail flight in 1911 (born 1888).
- 28 March – Françoise Rosay, actress (born 1891).
- 2 April – Georges Pompidou, President of France (born 1911).
- 9 April – Pierre Petiteau, rugby union player (born 1899).
- 18 April – Marcel Pagnol, novelist, playwright, and filmmaker (born 1895).
- 20 May – Jean Daniélou, theologian and historian (born 1905).
- 25 May – Robert Levasseur, rugby union player (born 1898).
- 7 June – Émilie Charmy, artist (born 1878).
- 12 June – André Marie, politician and Prime Minister of France (born 1897).
- 17 June – Pauline Carton, actress (born 1884).
- 19 June – Jean Wahl, philosopher (born 1888).
- 22 June
  - Darius Milhaud, composer (born 1892).
  - Alain Saint-Ogan, comics author and artist (born 1895).
  - Gaston Thubé, sailor and Olympic gold medallist (born 1876).

=== July to December ===
- 4 July – André Randall, actor (born 1892).
- 9 July – Georges Ribemont-Dessaignes, writer and artist (born 1884).
- August – André Edouard Marty, artist (born 1882).
- 4 September – Marcel Achard, playwright, screenwriter and author (born 1899).
- 17 September – André Dunoyer de Segonzac, painter and graphic artist (born 1884).
- 17 October – Jean Vaysse, rugby union player (born 1900).
- 27 October – Paul Frankeur, actor (born 1905).
- 22 November – Gilbert Degrémont, water treatment expert (born 1908).
- 20 December – André Jolivet, composer (born 1905).
- 21 December – Félix Amiot, aircraft constructor (born 1894).
- 26 December – Armand Marcelle, rower and Olympic medallist (born 1905).

=== Full date unknown ===
- Michel Alaux, fencing master and Olympic gold medallist (born 1924).
- Roger Giroux, poet (born 1925).
- René de Possel, mathematician (born 1905).

== See also ==
- List of French films of 1974
