= 2001–02 US Créteil-Lusitanos season =

US Créteil-Lusitanos
2001–02 season
- Head coach: Laurent Croci (until 19 March 2002); Ladislas Lozano (from 21 March 2002)
- French Division 2: 18th
- Coupe de France: Seventh round
- Coupe de la Ligue: Round of 32

The 2001–02 season was the 66th season in the existence of US Créteil-Lusitanos and the club's third consecutive season in the second division of French football. In addition to the domestic league, US Créteil-Lusitanos competed in this season's edition of the Coupe de France and Coupe de la Ligue. The season covered the period from 1 July 2001 to 30 June 2002.

== Players ==
=== First-team squad ===
Note: Flags indicate national team as defined under FIFA eligibility rules; some limited exceptions apply. Players may hold more than one non-FIFA nationality.

No.	Pos.	Nation	Player
—	GK	FRA	Cédric Duchesne
—	GK	FRA	Grégory Legrand
—	DF	FRA	Frédéric Tatarian
—	DF	FRA	Aboubacar Sankharé
—	DF	FRA	Benjamin Genton
—	DF	FRA	Alain Behi
—	DF	NCL	John Gope-Fenepej
—	DF	MLI	Sammy Traoré
—	DF	FRA	Yannick Rott
—	DF	FRA	Kevin Hatchi
—	DF	FRA	Olivier Frapolli
—	DF	FRA	Claude Dambury
—	DF	FRA	Cédric Fontaine
—	DF	FRA	Ghislain Anselmini
—	DF	ALG	Samir Amirèche
—	DF	FRA	Moussa Sidibé

No.	Pos.	Nation	Player
—	MF	CMR	Paul Essola
—	MF	FRA	Franck Histilloles
—	MF	TOG	Komlan Assignon
—	MF	FRA	Mohamed Zouaoui
—	MF	CMR	Frédéric Ayangma
—	MF	FRA	Nicolas Huysman
—	MF	FRA	Mickael Marquet
—	FW	FRA	Mickaël Madar
—	FW	FRA	Bernard Bouger
—	FW	FRA	Michaël Murcy
—	FW	FRA	Sébastien Dallet
—	FW	ALG	Fawzi Moussouni
—	FW	FRA	Julien Corti
—	FW	FRA	Hervé Ebanda
—	FW	TOG	Koffi Fiawoo

== Pre-season and friendlies ==
Win Draw Loss Fixtures

28 March 2002 Friendly	Paris Saint-Germain (France)	4–1	(France) Créteil	Saint-Germain-en-Laye, France
	Déhu (pen.); Aloisio; Ogbeche; Arteta		Goal	Stadium: Stade Municipal Georges Lefèvre
Note: Match was played in four 22-minute periods.

== Competitions ==
=== Overall record ===
Competition	First match	Last match	Starting round	Final position	Record							
Competition	First match	Last match	Starting round	Final position	Pld	W	D	L	GF	GA	GD	Win %
Division 2	28 July 2001	3 May 2002	Matchday 1	18th	38	9	14	15	35	46	−11	23.68
Coupe de France	3 November 2001		Seventh round	Seventh round	1	0	0	1	0	4	−4	0.00
Coupe de la Ligue	September 2001	December 2001	First round	Round of 32	2	1	0	1	5	5	+0	50.00
Total					41	10	14	17	40	55	−15	24.39

Source: Competitions

=== French Division 2 ===
==== League table ====
Pos	Team	Pld	W	D	L	GF	GA	GD	Pts	Promotion or Relegation
16	Grenoble	38	10	12	16	38	55	−17	42	
17	Istres	38	8	17	13	34	43	−9	41	
18	Créteil	38	9	14	15	35	46	−11	41	
19	Nîmes (R)	38	5	17	16	33	48	−15	32	Relegation to Championnat National [fr]
20	Martigues (R)	38	7	11	20	32	53	−21	32	Relegation to Championnat National [fr]

Source: Ligue 2
(R) Relegated

==== Results summary ====
Overall								Home						Away					
Pld	W	D	L	GF	GA	GD	Pts	W	D	L	GF	GA	GD	W	D	L	GF	GA	GD
38	9	14	15	35	46	−11	41	6	9	4	22	21	+1	3	5	11	13	25	−12

Source: Ligue 2

==== Results by round ====
Round	1	2	3	4	5	6	7	8	9	10	11	12	13	14	15	16	17	18	19	20	21	22	23	24	25	26	27	28	29	30	31	32	33	34	35	36	37	38
Ground	A	H	A	H	A	H	A	H	A	H	A	H	A	H	A	H	A	H	H	A	H	A	H	A	H	A	H	A	H	A	H	A	H	A	H	A	A	H
Result	W	D	L	L	L	W	L	D	D	L	L	D	D	D	L	L	L	W	D	L	W	L	D	D	W	L	D	L	D	W	L	D	D	D	W	L	W	W
Position	7	5	9	13	14	12	13	14	13	17	19	17	18	19	19	20	20	19	19	20	19	19	20	19	17	18	18	18	18	18	18	18	18	18	18	18	18	18

Source: Ligue 2
A = Away; H = Home; W = Win; D = Draw; L = Loss

==== Matches ====
28 July 2001 1	Le Mans	0–1	Créteil	Le Mans
--:-- CEST (UTC+2)				Stadium: Stade Léon-Bollée

5 August 2001 2	Créteil	1–1	Saint-Étienne	Créteil
--:-- CEST (UTC+2)				Stadium: Stade Dominique Duvauchelle

11 August 2001 3	Wasquehal	2–1	Créteil	Villeneuve-d'Ascq
--:-- CEST (UTC+2)				Stadium: Stadium Lille Métropole

18 August 2001 4	Créteil	0–2	Ajaccio	Créteil
--:-- CEST (UTC+2)				Stadium: Stade Dominique Duvauchelle

25 August 2001 5	Amiens	2–1	Créteil	Amiens
--:-- CEST (UTC+2)				Stadium: Stade de la Licorne

29 August 2001 6	Créteil	3–1	Gueugnon	Créteil
--:-- CEST (UTC+2)				Stadium: Stade Dominique Duvauchelle

8 September 2001 7	Martigues	3–1	Créteil	Martigues
--:-- CEST (UTC+2)				Stadium: Stade Francis Turcan

	Ajaccio	v	Créteil	Ajaccio
--:-- CEST (UTC+2)				Stadium: Stade François Coty

	Créteil	v	Amiens	Créteil
--:-- CEST (UTC+2)				Stadium: Stade Dominique Duvauchelle

	Créteil	v	Beauvais	Créteil
--:-- CEST (UTC+2)				Stadium: Stade Dominique Duvauchelle

	Beauvais	v	Créteil	Beauvais
--:-- CEST (UTC+2)				Stadium: Stade Pierre Brisson

	Créteil	v	Caen	Créteil
--:-- CEST (UTC+2)				Stadium: Stade Dominique Duvauchelle

	Caen	v	Créteil	Caen
--:-- CEST (UTC+2)				Stadium: Stade Michel d'Ornano

	Créteil	v	Châteauroux	Créteil
--:-- CEST (UTC+2)				Stadium: Stade Dominique Duvauchelle

	Châteauroux	v	Créteil	Châteauroux
--:-- CEST (UTC+2)				Stadium: Stade Gaston-Petit

	Créteil	v	Grenoble	Créteil
--:-- CEST (UTC+2)				Stadium: Stade Dominique Duvauchelle

	Grenoble	v	Créteil	Grenoble
--:-- CEST (UTC+2)				Stadium: Stade Lesdiguières

	Gueugnon	v	Créteil	Gueugnon
--:-- CEST (UTC+2)				Stadium: Stade Jean Laville

	Créteil	v	Istres	Créteil
--:-- CEST (UTC+2)				Stadium: Stade Dominique Duvauchelle

	Istres	v	Créteil	Istres
--:-- CEST (UTC+2)				Stadium: Stade Bernard Bardin

	Créteil	v	Laval	Créteil
--:-- CEST (UTC+2)				Stadium: Stade Dominique Duvauchelle

	Laval	v	Créteil	Laval
--:-- CEST (UTC+2)				Stadium: Stade Francis Le Basser

	Créteil	v	Le Havre	Créteil
--:-- CEST (UTC+2)				Stadium: Stade Dominique Duvauchelle

	Le Havre	v	Créteil	Le Havre
--:-- CEST (UTC+2)				Stadium: Stade Jules Deschaseaux

	Créteil	v	Le Mans	Créteil
--:-- CEST (UTC+2)				Stadium: Stade Dominique Duvauchelle

	Créteil	v	Martigues	Créteil
--:-- CEST (UTC+2)				Stadium: Stade Dominique Duvauchelle

	Créteil	v	Nancy	Créteil
--:-- CEST (UTC+2)				Stadium: Stade Dominique Duvauchelle

	Nancy	v	Créteil	Tomblaine
--:-- CEST (UTC+2)				Stadium: Stade Marcel Picot

	Créteil	v	Nice	Créteil
--:-- CEST (UTC+2)				Stadium: Stade Dominique Duvauchelle

	Nice	v	Créteil	Nice
--:-- CEST (UTC+2)				Stadium: Stade du Ray

	Créteil	v	Nîmes	Créteil
--:-- CEST (UTC+2)				Stadium: Stade Dominique Duvauchelle

	Nîmes	v	Créteil	Nîmes
--:-- CEST (UTC+2)				Stadium: Stade des Costières

	Créteil	v	Niort	Créteil
--:-- CEST (UTC+2)				Stadium: Stade Dominique Duvauchelle

	Niort	v	Créteil	Niort
--:-- CEST (UTC+2)				Stadium: Stade René Gaillard

	Saint-Étienne	v	Créteil	Saint-Étienne
--:-- CEST (UTC+2)				Stadium: Stade Geoffroy-Guichard

	Créteil	v	Strasbourg	Créteil
--:-- CEST (UTC+2)				Stadium: Stade Dominique Duvauchelle

	Strasbourg	v	Créteil	Strasbourg
--:-- CEST (UTC+2)				Stadium: Stade de la Meinau

	Créteil	v	Wasquehal	Créteil
--:-- CEST (UTC+2)				Stadium: Stade Dominique Duvauchelle

== Statistics ==
=== Squad statistics ===
No.	Pos	Nat	Player	Total		Division 2		Coupe de France		Coupe de la Ligue			
No.	Pos	Nat	Player	Apps	Goals	Apps	Goals	Apps	Goals	Apps	Goals		
Goalkeepers
1	GK	(France) FRA	[[]]	0	0	0	0	0	0	0	0	0	0
1	GK	(France) FRA	[[]]	0	0	0	0	0	0	0	0	0	0
Defenders
1	DF	(France) FRA	[[]]	0	0	0	0	0	0	0	0	0	0
1	DF	(France) FRA	[[]]	0	0	0	0	0	0	0	0	0	0
Midfielders
1	MF	(France) FRA	[[]]	0	0	0	0	0	0	0	0	0	0
1	MF	(France) FRA	[[]]	0	0	0	0	0	0	0	0	0	0
Forwards
1	FW	(France) FRA	[[]]	0	0	0	0	0	0	0	0	0	0
1	FW	(France) FRA	[[]]	0	0	0	0	0	0	0	0	0	0
Players who have made an appearance or had a squad number this season but have left the club
1	GK	(France) FRA	[[]]	0	0	0	0	0	0	0	0	0	0

=== Goalscorers ===
Rank	No.	Pos	Nat	Name	Division 2	Coupe de France	Coupe de la Ligue	Total	
1	1	FW	(France)	[[]]	0	0	0	0	
2	2	MF	(France)	[[]]	0	0	0	0	
2	Totals					0	0	0	0
