= 1977 in France =

- Decades: 1950s; 1960s; 1970s; 1980s; 1990s
- See also: History of France; Timeline of French history; List of years in France

Events from the year 1977 in France.

== Incumbents ==
- President: Valéry Giscard d'Estaing
- Prime Minister: Raymond Barre

== Events ==
- 13 March – Municipal Elections held.
- 20 March – Municipal Elections held.
- 27 June – Djibouti receives its independence from France.
- 10 September – Murderer Hamida Djandoubi's is the last guillotine execution in France (at Marseille) and the last legal beheading in the Western world.
- 7 December – Launch of the Simca Horizon, a five-door medium-sized hatchback which will also be built in Britain as a Chrysler and the US as a Plymouth and Dodge. It replaces the Simca 1100 in France, and runs alongside the Chrysler Avenger saloon and estate in Britain.

== Arts and literature ==
- 31 January – Centre Georges Pompidou in Paris officially opened.
- 7 May – Marie Myriam wins the Eurovision Song Contest 1977 for France with her song "L'oiseau et l'enfant" ("The Bird and the Child").

== Sport ==
- 30 June – Tour de France begins.
- 24 July – Tour de France ends, won by Bernard Thévenet.

== Births ==
=== January to March ===
- 3 January – Stéphane Pignol, soccer player
- 4 January
  - Louisa Baïleche, singer, dancer and performer
  - Jonathan Cochet, motor racing driver
- 11 January – Jérôme Kerviel, trader convicted of fraud for the 2008 Société Générale trading loss
- 26 January – Jean-Michel Sigere, soccer player
- 27 January – Siramana Dembélé, soccer player
- 29 January – Alexandre Rousselet, cross-country skier
- 9 February – Nicolas Coutelot, tennis player
- 15 February – Pierre-Emmanuel Dalcin, Alpine skier
- 16 February – Charles P. de Saint-Aignan, software engineer
- 20 February – Nicolas Dessum, ski jumper
- 23 February – Freddy Bourgeois, soccer player
- 27 February – Jean-Pierre Vidal, alpine skier and Olympic gold medallist
- 28 February
  - Pierre Mignoni, rugby union player
  - Jean-François Rivière, soccer player
- 4 March – Grégory Le Corvec, rugby union player
- 7 March – Jérôme Fernandez, handball player
- 8 March – Estelle Desanges, pornographic actress
- 9 March
  - Sébastien Chabaud, soccer player
  - Vincent Defrasne, biathlete and Olympic gold medallist
- 12 March – David Bouard, soccer player
- 15 March – Frédéric Serrat, boxer
- 18 March – Willy Sagnol, international soccer player

=== April to June ===
- 1 April – Vincent Doukantié, soccer player
- 2 April – Marc Raquil, athlete
- 13 April – Bertrand Laquait, soccer player
- 13 April – Olivier Olibeau, rugby union player
- 30 April – Lilian Compan, soccer player
- 1 May – Jean-Michel Lesage, soccer player
- 7 May – Zoé Félix, actress
- 10 May – Gabriel Monnier, figure skater
- 14 May – Claude Crétier, alpine skier
- 20 May – Mathieu Blin, rugby union player
- 10 June – Benjamin Millepied, dancer and choreographer
- 11 June – Vincent Ehouman, soccer player
- 12 June – Anita Tijoux, alternative hip-hop singer
- 16 June – Delphine Pelletier, athlete
- 19 June – Stéphan Perrot, swimmer
- 22 June – Frédéric Weis, basketball player
- 24 June – Jean-Philippe Caillet, soccer player
- 30 June – Christophe Landrin, soccer player

=== July to September ===
- 5 July – Jérôme Éyana, athlete
- 6 July – Audrey Fleurot, actress
- 13 July
  - Christophe Meslin, soccer player
  - Romain Mesnil, pole vaulter
- 20 July – Yves Niaré, shot putter
- 24 July – Cédric Anselin, soccer player
- 26 July – Christophe Laurent, cyclist
- 8 August – Romain Pitau, soccer player
- 9 August – Mikaël Silvestre, international soccer player
- 15 August – Malek Aït-Alia, soccer player
- 17 August – Thierry Henry, international soccer player
- 18 August – Ludovic Roy, soccer player
- 23 August – Yoann Bigné, soccer player
- 24 August – Arnaud Gonzalez, soccer player
- 27 August – Martial Robin, soccer player
- 2 September – Frédéric Kanouté, soccer player
- 3 September – Stéphane Bonsergent, cyclist
- 3 September – Yannick Zambernardi, soccer player
- 9 September – Sébastien Gimbert, motorcycle road racer
- 11 September – Ludovic Hubler, hitchhiker
- 28 September – Julien Pillet, sabre fencer and twice Olympic medallist
- 30 September – Jean-Sébastien Jaurès, soccer player

=== October to December ===
- 2 October – Patrick Barul, soccer player
- 5 October – Christian Bassila, soccer player
- 7 October – Sébastien de Chaunac, tennis player
- 8 October – Anne-Caroline Chausson, Mountain bike racer
- 11 October – Jérémie Janot, soccer player
- 15 October – David Trezeguet, international soccer player
- 31 October – Sylviane Félix, athlete and Olympic medallist
- 31 October – Séverine Ferrer, singer
- 6 November – Frédéric Mathieu, politician
- 12 November – Jérémy Henin, soccer player
- 21 November – Kodjo Afanou, soccer player
- 23 November – Jean-Baptiste Élissalde, rugby union player
- 29 November – Cédric Uras, soccer player
- 30 November – Virginie Guilhaume, television host
- 1 December – Joseph-Désiré Job, soccer player
- 2 December – Jérôme Thion, rugby union player
- 8 December – Sébastien Chabal, rugby union player
- 14 December – Romain Dumas, motor racing driver
- 17 December – Arnaud Clément, tennis player
- 27 December – Emmanuel Macron, French president
- 30 December – Alex Jeannin, soccer player

=== Full date unknown ===
- Jean-Pascal Chaigne, composer and musicologist
- Éléonore Gosset, actress

== Deaths ==
=== January to March ===
- 10 January – Jean Taris, swimmer and Olympic medallist (born 1909)
- 12 January – Henri-Georges Clouzot, film director, screenwriter and producer (born 1907)
- 13 January – Henri Langlois, pioneer of film preservation and restoration (born 1914)
- 14 January – Anaïs Nin, writer (born 1903)
- 19 January – Yvonne Printemps, singer and actress (born 1894)
- 24 January – Marc Detton, rower and Olympic medallist (born 1901)
- 10 February – Alain Escoffier, anti-communist activist, self-immolated (born 1949)
- 2 March – Eugénie Brazier, chef, "la mère" of modern French cooking (born 1895)

=== April to June ===
- 3 April – Pierre-Marie Théas, Roman Catholic bishop (born 1894)
- 11 April
  - Henri-Irénée Marrou, historian (born 1904).
  - Jacques Prévert, poet and screenwriter (born 1900)
- 2 May – Jean-Claude Lebaube, cyclist (born 1937)
- 17 May – Claude Roger-Marx, writer (born 1888)
- May – Annette Laming-Emperaire, archeologist (born 1917)
- 22 June – Jacqueline Audry, film director (born 1908)

=== July to September ===
- 4 July – Michel Olçomendy, first Archbishop of Singapore (born 1901)
- 7 July – Eugène Criqui, world champion boxer (born 1893)
- 29 July – Pierre Clastres, anthropologist and ethnographer (born 1934)
- 13 August – Marie-Hélène Cardot, French resistance leader and politician (born 1899)
- 21 August – Pierre Cot, politician (born 1895)
- 4 September
  - Adolphe Jauréguy, rugby union player (born 1898)
  - Jean Rostand, biologist and philosopher (born 1894)
- 10 September – Hamida Djandoubi, last person executed in France (born 1949)
- 14 September – Marcel Carpentier, military officer (born 1895)
- 29 September – Jean Marsan, screenwriter and actor (born 1920)

=== October to December ===
- 19 October – René Mourlon, athlete and Olympic medallist (born 1893)
- 20 October – Marie-Thérèse Walter, mistress of Pablo Picasso (born 1909)
- 25 October – Félix Gouin, politician (born 1884)
- 3 November – Armand Lunel, writer, last known speaker of Shuadit (born 1892)
- 5 November – René Goscinny, author, editor and humorist (born 1926)
- 7 December – Georges Grignard, motor racing driver (born 1905)
- 12 December – Raymond Bernard, filmmaker (born 1891)
- 19 December – Jacques Tourneur, film director (born 1904)

=== Full date unknown ===
- Léonie Duquet, nun, killed by a death squad in Argentina (born 1916)
- Marcel Fétique, bow maker (born 1899).
- Georges Miquelle, cellist (born 1894)

== See also ==
- 1977 in French television
- List of French films of 1977
