= List of French films of 1977 =

This is a list of French film productions that premiered in 1977.

== Films ==
Title	Director	Cast	Genre	Notes
Alice or the Last Escapade	Claude Chabrol	Sylvia Kristel, Charles Vanel, Jean Carmet	Drama	
The American Friend	Wim Wenders	Bruno Ganz, Dennis Hopper, Lisa Kreuzer	Drama	West German–French co-production
Animal	Claude Zidi	Jean-Paul Belmondo, Raquel Welch, Charles Gerard	Comedy	
Another Man, Another Chance	Claude Lelouch	James Caan, Geneviève Bujold, Francis Huster	Drama	French–American co-production
L'Apprenti salaud	Michel Deville	Robert Lamoureux, Christine Dejoux	Drama	
Arrête ton char... bidasse!	Michel Gérard	Darry Cowl, Pierre Tornade, Robert Castel, Stéphane Hillel	Comedy	
Beyond Good and Evil	Liliana Cavani	Dominique Sanda, Erland Josephson, Robert Powell	Drama	Italian–French–West German co-production
Bilitis	David Hamilton	Patti D'Arbanville, Mona Kristensen, Bernard Giraudeau	Romance, adult	
The Blue Ferns	Françoise Sagan	Françoise Fabian, Gilles Ségal, Jean-Marc Bory	Drama	
Cathy's Curse	Eddy Matalon	Alan Scarfe, Beverley Murray, Hubert Noel	Horror	Canadian–French co-production
À chacun son enfer	André Cayatte	Annie Girardot, Bernard Fresson, Stéphane Hillel		French-West German co-production
Colloque de chiens	Raúl Ruiz	Eva Simonet, Hugo Santiago, Michel Such	Avant-garde	
Comme la lune	Joël Séria	Jean-Pierre Marielle, Sophie Daumier	Comedy drama	
The Devil Probably	Robert Bresson	Antoine Monnier, Tina Irissari, Laetita Carcano	Drama	
The Forbidden Room	Dino Risi	Vittorio Gassman, Catherine Deneuve, Danilo Mattei		Italian-French co-production
The French Woman	Just Jaeckin	Françoise Fabian, Dayle Haddon, Murray Head	Adult	
Le Gang	Jacques Deray	Alain Delon, Xavier Depraz, Roland Bertin		French-Italian co-production
Gloria	Claude Autant-Lara	Nicole Maurey, Maurice Biraud, Andrée Tainsy	Drama	
Goodbye Emmanuelle	François Leterrier	Sylvia Kristel, Umberto Orsini, Alexandra Stewart	Adult	
Golden Night	Serge Moati	Bernard Blier, Klaus Kinski, Marie Dubois, Jean-Luc Bideau, Charles Vanel	Crime	French-German co-production
Helga, la louve de Spilberg	Alain Payet	Malisa Longo		
Le Juge Fayard dit Le Shériff	Yves Boisset	Patrick Dewaere, Aurore Clément		
Julie pot de colle	Philippe de Broca	Marlène Jobert, Jean-Claude Brialy, Alexandra Stewart	Comedy	
The Lacemaker	Claude Goretta	Isabelle Huppert, Yves Beneyton, Florence Giorgetti	Drama	French–Swiss co–production
La Nuit, tous les chats sont gris	Gérard Zingg	Gérard Depardieu, Robert Stephens, Laura Betti	Comedy-drama	
The Lorry	Marguerite Duras	Marguerite Duras, Gérard Depardieu	Avant-garde	
Ma-ma	Elisabeta Bostan	Lyudmila Gurchenko, Mikhail Boyarsky	Children's, fantasy, musical	Romanian–Soviet–French co-production
The Man Who Loved Women	François Truffaut	Charles Denner, Brigitte Fossey	Comedy drama	
Madame Rosa	Moshé Mizrahi	Simone Signoret, Claude Dauphin, Sammy Ben Youb	Drama	
La Menace	Alain Corneau	Yves Montand, Carole Laure, Marie Dubois		French-Canadian co-production
The Model Couple	William Klein	André Dussollier, Anémone, Zouc	Comedy	
Mort d'un pourri	Georges Lautner	Alain Delon, Ornella Muti, Stéphane Audran		
La Nuit de Saint-Germain-des-Prés	Bob Swaim	Michel Galabru, Mort Shuman, Chantal Dupuy		
One Sings, the Other Doesn't	Agnès Varda	Valérie Mairesse, Ali Raffi, Thérèse Liotard	Drama	
Parisian Life	Christian-Jaque	Jacques Jouanneau, Dany Saval, Jacques Dynam	Music	
A Spiral of Mist	Eriprando Visconti	Claude Jade, Marc Porel, Carole Chauvet	Drama	
Pardon Mon Affaire, Too!	Yves Robert	Jean Rochefort, Claude Brasseur		
Providence	Alain Resnais	John Gielgud, Ellen Burstyn, Dirk Bogarde	Drama	French–Swiss co-production
The Purple Taxi	Yves Boisset	Charlotte Rampling, Philippe Noiret, Peter Ustinov, Fred Astaire	Drama	French–Irish–Italian co-production
Shadow of the Castles	Daniel Duval	Philippe Léotard	Drama	Entered into the 10th Moscow International Film Festival
Solemn Communion	Gérard Blain	Véronique Silver, Marcel Dalio	Comedy drama	Entered into the 1977 Cannes Film Festival
Spoiled Children	Bertrand Tavernier	Michel Piccoli, Christine Pascal, Michel Aumont	Drama	
That Obscure Object of Desire	Luis Buñuel	Fernando Rey, Carole Bouquet, Ángela Molina	Comedy	

== See also ==
- 1977 in France
- 1977 in French television
