= 1975 in France =

- Decades: 1950s; 1960s; 1970s; 1980s; 1990s
- See also: History of France; Timeline of French history; List of years in France

Events from the year 1975 in France.

== Incumbents ==
- President: Valéry Giscard d'Estaing
- Prime Minister: Jacques Chirac

== Events ==
- 1 January – Work is abandoned on the British end of the Channel Tunnel.
- March – Launch of the Renault 30, Renault's first postwar six-cylinder car and Renault's flagship car to compete with the likes of the Citroen CX and BMW 5 Series, and the first production car of its size to feature a hatchback.
- 6 March – A bomb explodes in the Paris offices of Springer Press. The 6 March Group (connected to the Red Army Faction) demands amnesty for the Baader-Meinhof Group.
- 6 July – The Comoros declare their independence from France.
- September – Chrysler Europe launches the Simca 1307, a large five-door hatchback which will go on sale in Britain in the new year as the Chrysler Alpine. It is similar in size and design to the Renault 16, and is one of the first cars of its size to feature a hatchback.
- 15 September – The department of Corse, comprising the entire island of Corsica, is divided into two departments: Haute-Corse and Corse-du-Sud.
- November
  - Launch of the Renault 20, a four-cylinder version of the Renault 30 with minor styling changes.
  - SNCF Class 140C steam locomotive No 38 works a freight train between its depot at Gray and Chalindrey, the last steam-hauled train operated commercially by SNCF.
- 15–17 November – 1st G6 summit at Rambouillet.
- December – The Simca 1307 is voted European Car of the Year.

== Sport ==
- 26 June – Tour de France begins.
- 20 July – Tour de France ends, won by Bernard Thévenet.

== Births ==
=== January to March ===
- 3 January – Thomas Bangalter, musician and founder of Daft Punk
- 9 January – Xavier Méride, soccer player.
- 10 January
  - Olivier Chapuis, ice dancer.
  - Alexis Loret, actor.
- 21 January – Thomas Castaignède, rugby player and journalist
- 26 January – Alexandre Péclier, rugby union player.
- 5 February – Frédéric Baud, Nordic combined skier.
- 7 February – Emily Loizeau, author, composer and singer.
- 17 February – Marie-Pierre Leray, figure skater.
- 8 March – François Grenet, soccer player.
- 12 March – Valérie Nicolas, team handball player.
- 21 March – Souleymane M'baye, boxer.
- 22 March – Ludovic Turpin, cyclist.
- 25 March – Gaspard Manesse, actor and musician.

=== April to June ===
- 4 April – Delphine Arnault, businesswoman.
- 12 April – Laurent Wauquiez, politician and minister.
- 18 April – Frédéric Née, soccer player.
- 27 April – Xavier Gens, film director.
- 30 April – David Moncoutié, cyclist.
- 16 May – Jean-Christophe Devaux, soccer player.
- 31 May – Emmanuel Jonnier, cross-country skier.
- 2 June – Sébastien Schemmel, soccer player.
- 18 June – Jamel Debbouze, actor.
- 24 June – Laurent Tobel, figure skater.
- 26 June – Philippe Delaye, soccer player.

=== July to September ===
- 4 July – Thierry Zig, basketball player.
- 8 July – Régis Laconi, motorcycle racer.
- 17 July – Vincent Vittoz, cross-country skier.
- 18 July – Emmanuel Hostache, bobsledder (died 2007).
- 23 July – Didier Lemaire, politician
- 25 July – Isabelle Blanc, snowboarder and Olympic gold medallist.
- 27 July – Grégoire Colin, actor.
- 31 July – Kavinsky, DJ and record producer (died 2026).
- 16 August – Didier Agathe, soccer player.
- 30 August – Younous Oumouri, soccer player.
- 3 September – Cristobal Huet, ice hockey player.
- 3 September – Stéphane Samson, soccer player.
- 6 September – Sylvie Becaert, biathlete.
- 19 September – Caroline Fourest, feminist writer, journalist and editor.
- 23 September – Laurent Batlles, soccer player.
- 30 September – Marion Cotillard, actress.
- 30 September – Laure Pequegnot, Alpine skier.

=== October to December ===
- 5 October – Bobo Baldé, soccer player.
- 12 October – Cédric Duchesne, soccer player.
- 16 October – Christophe Maé, singer.
- 21 October – François Thiollet, politician
- 2 November – Stéphane Sarrazin, motor racing driver.
- 4 November – Yoann Le Boulanger, cyclist.
- 6 November – Matthieu Lièvremont, rugby union player.
- 7 November – Raphaël Haroche, singer.
- 9 November
  - Djézon Boutoille, soccer player.
  - Raphaël Enthoven, philosopher, media presenter and novelist.
- 13 November – Alain Digbeu, basketball player.
- 20 November – Sébastien Hamel, soccer player.
- 20 November – Nicolas Savinaud, soccer player.
- 26 November – Marinette Pichon, soccer player.
- 9 December – Olivier Milloud, rugby union player.

=== Full date unknown ===
- Paul Renaud, illustrator and comic book artist.

== Deaths ==
=== January to March ===
- 9 January – Pierre Fresnay, actor (born 1897).
- 14 January – Pierre David-Weill, investment banker (born 1900).
- 22 January – Paul Antoine Aristide Montel, mathematician (born 1876).
- 9 February – Pierre Dac, humorist and French Resistance activist (born 1893).
- 13 February – André Beaufre, military officer (born 1902).
- 24 February – Marcel Grandjany, harpist and composer (born 1891).
- 2 March – Madeleine Vionnet, fashion designer (born 1876).
- 3 March – Yves Godard, military officer (born 1911).
- 9 March – Joseph Guillemot, athlete and Olympic gold medallist (born 1899).
- 13 March – Jean Del Val, actor (born 1891).
- 18 March – Adrienne Bolland, test pilot and first woman to fly over the Andes (born 1895).
- 25 March – Michèle Girardon, actress (born 1938).

=== April to June ===
- 4 April – Pierre Galopin, military officer, executed.
- 11 April – André Obey, playwright (born 1892).
- 12 April – Josephine Baker, actress (born 1906 in the United States).
- 25 April – Mike Brant, Israeli singer, committed suicide in Paris (born 1947).
- 25 April – Jacques Duclos, politician (born 1896).
- 30 April – Gen Paul, painter and engraver (born 1895).
- 8 May – Joseph Muller, cyclist (born 1895).
- 13 May – Charles Vaurie, ornithologist (born 1906).
- 19 May – Jacques Natanson, writer (born 1901).
- 21 May – Jean Fontenay, cyclist (born 1911).
- 23 May – Paul Legentilhomme, military officer (born 1884).
- 24 May – Guy La Chambre, politician (born 1898).

=== July to December ===
- 7 July – Henri Deglane, Olympic wrestler (born 1902)
- 20 September – Saint-John Perse, poet and diplomat, awarded the Nobel Prize for Literature in 1960 (born 1887).
- 23 September – René Thomas, motor racing driver (born 1886).
- 27 September – Maurice Feltin, cardinal (born 1883).
- 3 October – Guy Mollet, politician (born 1905).
- 15 October – Jacques Charon, actor and film director (born 1920).
- 16 October – Jean Odin, politician (born 1889).
- 28 October – Georges Carpentier, boxer (born 1894).
- 22 November – François de Roubaix, film score composer (born 1939).
- 19 December – René Maheu, professor of philosophy and Director General of UNESCO (born 1905).
- 22 December – René Floriot, lawyer (born 1902).

=== Full date unknown ===
- Albert-Félix de Lapparent, palaeontologist and Jesuit priest (born 1905).

== See also ==
- List of French films of 1975
