= Ebanda =

Ebanda could be both a masculine given name and a surname. Notable people with this name include:

- Ebanda Manfred (1935–2003), Cameroonian singer
- Isabelle Ebanda (born 1936), Cameroonian politician
- Hervé Ebanda (born 1979), French footballer
