= List of people from Lorient =

A list of notable people from Lorient, France:

== Academics ==
- Jacques Cambry (1749–1807), expert on Celtic France
- Pierre Fatou (1878–1929), mathematician and astronomer
- Irène Frain (b. 1950), novelist, journalist, and historian
- Ernest Hello (1828–1885), Catholic philosopher
- Nicole Le Douarin (b. 1930), developmental biologist

== Arts and Music ==
- Frédéric Adam (1904–1984), conductor and composer
- Auguste Brizeux (1803–1858), poet
- Charles Delioux (1825–1915), composer and pianist
- Marie Dorval (1798–1849), actress
- Camille Guérini (1900–1963), actor
- Viktor Lazlo (b. 1960), singer
- Tristan Le Govic (b. 1976), harp player
- Victor Massé (1822–1884), composer
- Theodore Roussel (1847–1926), painter
- Jacques Vaché (1895–1919), surrealist

== Military ==
- Jacques Andrieux (1917–2005), WWII fighter ace
- François Joseph Bouvet de Précourt (1753–1832), admiral
- Jean-Baptiste Chaigneau (1769–1832), French Navy sailor and adventurer
- Jean-Marie Dutertre (1768–1811), privateer
- Pierre-François Forissier (b.1951), Chief of Staff of the French Navy
- Fernand Louis Armand Marie de Langle de Cary (1849–1927), WWI general
- René Constant Le Marant de Kerdaniel (1777–1862), admiral

== Politics ==
- Pierre-Paul Guieysse (1841–1914), Socialist politician
- François de La Rocque (1885–1946), leader of the Croix de Feu and Parti Social Français
- Robert Le Masson (1365–1443), Chancellor of France
- Jean-Yves Le Drian (b.1947), Socialist politician
- Béatrice Patrie (b.1957), judge and European Parliament member
- Julien Schmaltz (1771–1826), governor of Senegal
- Jules Simon (1814–1896), Moderate Republican politician

== Sports ==
- Mouloud Akloul (b.1983), footballer
- Marc Boutruche (b.1976), footballer
- Philippe Celdran (b.1973), footballer
- Georges Eo (b.1948), football manager
- Yvon Goujon (b.1937), footballer
- Ronan Le Crom (b.1974), footballer
- Christophe Le Roux (b.1969), footballer
- Jérémy Morel (b.1984), footballer
- Nicolas Ouédec (b.1971), footballer
- Hervé Phélippeau (b.1962), runner
- Georges Van Straelen (1956–2012), footballer and coach
- Cyrille Watier (b.1972), footballer
- Cyril Yapi (b.1980), footballer

== Other ==
- Joseph Yves Limantour (1812–1885), merchant in the California sea trade
- Louis Maurice Adolphe Linant de Bellefonds (1799–1883), chief engineer of the Suez Canal
- Raymond Rallier du Baty (1881–1978), sailor and explorer
