= Le Gang =

- Directed by: Jacques Deray
- Screenplay by: Alphonse Boudard; Jean-Claude Carrière
- Based on: Le Gang by Roger Borniche
- Starring: Alain Delon; Xavier Depraz; Roland Bertin; Adalberto Maria Merli; Maurice Barrier; Raymond Bussières
- Cinematography: Silvano Ippoliti
- Edited by: Henri Larnoë
- Music by: Carlo Rustichelli
- Production companies: Adel Productions; Mondial Te.Fi
- Release dates: 19 January 1977 (France); 10 February 1977 (Italy)
- Running time: 100 minutes
- Countries: France; Italy
- Budget: 13 million francs

Le Gang (lit. 'The Gang') is a 1977 crime film directed by Jacques Deray and starring Alain Delon, Xavier Depraz, Roland Bertin, Adalberto Maria Merli, Maurice Barrier and Raymond Bussières.

== Plot ==
In the post-war France, the Gang of the Tractions Avant headlines by his burglars never causing loss of life.

== Cast ==
- Alain Delon as Robert "Le dingue" (lit. 'The Looney')
- Xavier Depraz as Jo
- Roland Bertin as Raymond
- Adalberto Maria Merli as Manu
- Maurice Barrier as Lucien dit 'Le Mammouth'
- Raymond Bussières as Cornélius
- Giampiero Albertini as Léon
- Laura Betti as Felicia
- Nicole Calfan as Marinette
- Angès Château as Raymond's girlfriend
- Dominique Davray as a prostitute
- Catherine Lachens as Janine
- Robert Dalban as ratcatcher
- André Falcon as the jeweler
- Henri Attal as Cornélius' customer

== Production ==
Following the box office returns of Flic Story, director Jacques Deray put his project of adapting Boileau-Narcejac novel Opération Primevère on hold to do a sixth film with actor Alain Delon. Deray opted to again adapt a book by Roger Borniche.

Le Gang was a French and Italian international co-production between the Paris-based Adel Productions and the Rome-based Mondial Te.Fi. It was a predominantly French production with 70% of the 13 million francs budget being from Adel.

The film began filming its 13-week shoot on May 24, 1976.

== Release ==
Le Gang was released in France on January 19, 1977. Roberto Curti and Frank Lafond, the authors of French Thrillers of the 1970s: Volume I, Crime Films said that Le Gang had "disappointing business in France after a deceptive start.", noting it led the French box office in the opening week before dropping after. It had 1,190,000 spectators making it Delon's second-highest viewed film of his four in 1977.

It was released in Italy as Le gang del parigino on February 10, 1977.

== See also ==
- List of French films of 1977
