= David Coulibaly =

Malian footballer (born 1978)

Personal information
- Full name: David Daouda Coulibaly
- Date of birth: 21 January 1978 (age 48)
- Place of birth: Roubaix, France
- Height: 1.75 m (5 ft 9 in)
- Position: Defensive midfielder

Youth career
- Lille

Senior career*
Years	Team	Apps	(Gls)
1995–2000	Lille	25	(0)
2000	→ Châteauroux (loan)	12	(1)
2000–2004	Châteauroux	96	(6)
2003	→ Wasquehal (loan)	13	(0)
2004–2005	Niort	17	(0)
2005–2007	Grenoble	50	(0)
2007–2008	Tours FC	31	(1)
2008–2009	Arles	7	(0)
2009–2015	Wasquehal		

International career
2000–2004	Mali	19	(1)
- * Club domestic league appearances and goals as of 23 April 2009

David Coulibaly (born 21 January 1978) is a retired footballer. He last played for Entente Sportive de Wasquehal. Born in France, he represented Mali at international level.

== International career ==
He was capped for Mali at the 2002 and 2004 editions of the African Cup of Nations finals.

Scores and results list Mali's goal tally first, score column indicates score after each Coulibaly goal.

List of international goals scored by David Coulibaly
No.	Date	Venue	Opponent	Score	Result	Competition	Ref.
1	19 November 2003	Stade Mohammed V, Casablanca, Morocco	Morocco	1–0	1–0	Friendly	
