= 1977 in French television =

This is a list of French television related events from 1977.

== Events ==
- 6 March – Marie Myriam is selected to represent France at the 1977 Eurovision Song Contest with her song "L'oiseau et l'enfant". She is selected to be the twenty-first French Eurovision entry during a national final.
- 7 May – France wins the 22nd Eurovision Song Contest in London, United Kingdom. The winning song is "L'oiseau et l'enfant", performed by Marie Myriam.

== Debuts ==
- 16 September – Téléfoot

== Television shows ==
=== 1940s ===
- Le Jour du Seigneur (1949–present)

=== 1950s ===
- La Piste aux étoiles (1956–1978)

=== 1960s ===
- La Tête et les Jambes (1960–1978)
- Les Dossiers de l'écran (1967–1991)
- Monsieur Cinéma (1967–1980)
- Les Animaux du monde (1969–1990)
- Alain Decaux raconte (1969–1987)

=== 1970s ===
- Aujourd'hui Madame (1970–1982)
- 30 millions d'amis (1976–2016)
- Les Jeux de 20 Heures (1976–1987)

== Births ==
- 2 January – Christophe Beaugrand, television presenter & journalist
- 6 July – Audrey Fleurot, television & film actress
- 30 November – Virginie Guilhaume, television presenter

== Deaths ==
- 19 March – Albert Dieudonné, actor, screenwriter, film director and novelist (born 1889).

== See also ==
- 1977 in France
- List of French films of 1977
