= Nourredine El Ouardani =

French football manager (born 1978)

Personal information
- Date of birth: 4 January 1978 (age 48)
- Place of birth: Sartène, France

Managerial career
- Years: Team
- 2013–2017: Tours (U19)
- 2017: Tours (caretaker)
- 2017: Tours (assistant)
- 2017–2019: Tours (U19)
- 2019: Tours B
- 2019–2024: Tours

Nourredine El Ouardani (born 4 January 1978) is a French football manager.

== Career ==
Nourredine El Ouardani was born in Sartène on 4 January 1978. A former amateur football player-manager, El Ouardani was appointed caretaker manager of last place Tours near the end of the 2016–17 Ligue 2 season. He led the club through a run of six league matches without defeat, saving Tours from relegation.

On 1 July 2019, he was appointed as manager of Tours.

== Personal life ==
He holds French and Moroccan nationalities.
