= Butterfly on the Shoulder =

- Directed by: Jacques Deray
- Written by: Jean-Claude Carrière; Tonino Guerra
- Based on: The Velvet Well by John Gearon
- Produced by: Yves Gasser; Yves Peyrot; Klaus Hellwig
- Starring: Lino Ventura
- Cinematography: Jean Boffety; Jean Charvein
- Edited by: Henri Lanoë
- Music by: Claude Bolling
- Production company: Gaumont
- Distributed by: Gaumont Distribution
- Release date: 3 May 1978
- Running time: 95 minutes
- Language: French
- Box office: $4.1 million

Butterfly on the Shoulder (or Un papillon sur l'épaule) is a French drama, thriller film directed by Jacques Deray.

== Plot ==
When he stops in Barcelona (Catalonia) with his wife for a week, Roland Fériaud discovered in his hotel a man in agony before being knocked out. He wakes up in a mental hospital where he questions the insistently on a mysterious briefcase that he has no memory.

== Cast ==
- Lino Ventura : Roland Fériaud
- Paul Crauchet : Raphaël
- Nicole Garcia : Sonia
- Jean Bouise : Dr. Bavier
- Laura Betti : Madame Carrabo
- Xavier Depraz : Miguel Carrabo
- Jacques Maury : Goma
- Dominique Lavanant : The Young Woman
- José Lifante : The Commissioner
- Claudine Auger : The coat's woman
- Roland Bertin : The Official

== Accolades ==
Year	Award	Category	Recipient	Result
1979	César Awards	César Award for Best Editing	Henri Lanoë	Nominated
