= Kennedy et moi =

- Theatrical release poster
- Directed by: Sam Karmann
- Written by: Jean-Paul Dubois; Sam Karmann
- Produced by: Raphaël Berdugo; Jean-Claude Bourlat; Christian Bérard; Edouard Weil
- Starring: Jean-Pierre Bacri; Nicole Garcia; Patrick Chesnais; Sam Karmann
- Cinematography: Guillaume Schiffman
- Edited by: Philippe Bourgueil
- Music by: Pierre Adenot
- Distributed by: Pathé Distribution
- Release date: December 22, 1999 (France)
- Running time: 86 minutes
- Country: France
- Language: French

Kennedy et moi is a French film directed by Sam Karmann released on 22 December 1999. It is a comedy drama about an apathetic writer whose only interest is in his psychiatrist's watch which may have belonged to John F. Kennedy at the time of his assassination in 1963.

== Cast ==
- Jean-Pierre Bacri: Simon Polaris
- Nicole Garcia: Anna Polaris
- Patrick Chesnais: Paul Gurney
- Sam Karmann: Robert Janssen
- François Chattot: Victor Kuriakhine
- Éléonore Gosset: Alice Polaris
- Lucas Bonnifait: Thomas Polaris
- Stephan Höhn: Thibaut Brentano
- Bruno Raffaelli: Doctor Munthe
- Francine Bergé: Lydia Brentano
- Jean-Claude Brialy: Benny Grimaldi
- Bernard Blancan (Scenes deleted)
