= Thierry Bernard-Gotteland =

French artist

Thierry Bernard-Gotteland (born 1974) is a French artist. He lives and works between France and Vietnam.

== Biography ==
Born in Chambéry, Savoie, TBG studied at the Willem de Kooning Academy in Rotterdam, the Netherlands (2001), before graduating from the École Supérieure d'Art de Grenoble (1997–2002) (https://esad-gv.fr/), France. He subsequently joined the post-diploma programme at Le Fresnoy – Studio national des arts contemporains—Promotion Van der Keuken 2002–2004 (https://www.lefresnoy.net/en/), where he further developed his interdisciplinary practice at the intersection of contemporary art, technology, and audiovisual media.

Between 1999 and 2006, he worked as an artist assistant for Yan Pei-Ming, Gianni Motti, Atau Tanaka, and Antoni Muntadas, experiences that significantly informed his artistic approach to installation, performance, and conceptual practice.

== Scholarships ==
- 2001: Willem de Kooning, Rotterdam (NL)
- 2002–2004: Le Fresnoy, National French Studio of Contemporary Arts, Tourcoing (F)
- 2019-2026: RMIT Melbourne, Practice-based research Ph. D [PRS ASIA]

== Events ==
=== Solo exhibitions ===
- 2017 :
  - Echoing Scars, Galerie Quynh, Ho Chi Minh City, Vietnam (http://galeriequynh.com/exhibition/echoing-scars/)
- 2011 :
  - A Physical Obedience of a Certain Geometry [Nihil Sublime], Galerie Quynh, Ho Chi Minh City, Vietnam
- 2008 :
  - D.E.A.F. D.E.C.A.D.E,"The Month of Images Festival" organized by the French Embassy, San Art Gallery, Ho Chi Minh City, Vietnam
- 2007 :
  - Entre Chien et Loup, IDECAF Cultural Franco-Vietnamese Center, Ho Chi Minh City, Vietnam
- 2005 :
  - R.D.V., La Maison du Geste et de l'Image, Paris, France

=== Group shows ===
- 2016 :
  - TechNoPhobe, The Factory Contemporary Arts Centre, Ho Chi Minh City, Vietnam
- 2014 :
  - Being Present, Galerie Quynh, Ho Chi Minh City, Vietnam
  - Onward and Upward, Galerie Quynh, Ho Chi Minh City, Vietnam
- 2011 :
  - Fete dela WSK!, Sonic Art Festival, Manila, The Philippines "MOETH" live performance by Thierry Bernard-Gotteland & Mohamad Wahid
  - Esperanto Polis, Ho Chi Minh City, Vietnam
  - To Ho Chi Minh City with Love: A Social Sculpture, an art project by Phong Bui, San Art Gallery, Ho Chi Minh City, Vietnam
  - Mise-en-Scène, Galerie Quynh, Ho Chi Minh City, Vietnam
- 2008 :
  - Archigames, Territoire de l’Image, Le Fresnoy, 10 ans de création, Lab – La banque, Bethune, France
- 2007 :
  - Alpine Random Stereo World, Filmer La Musique, Le Point Ephémère, Paris, France
  - ZurichBangkokSaigon, Des Monts de la Lune, la Nuit Blanche, Paris, France
- 2005 :
  - Sound Drop, La Nuit Blanche, La Goutte d’Or, Paris, France
  - Itinéraires Privés, Galerie Espace Croisé CAC Roubaix, France
  - Festival 1° Contact, Biennale of Digital Arts, Le Cube – Issy les Moulineaux, France
- 2004 :
  - Blobmeister Millennium Bash, Panorama 5, Le Fresnoy – National Studio of Contemporary Arts, Tourcoing, France
- 2003 :
  - Archigames, Panorama 4, Le Fresnoy – National Studio of Contemporary Arts, Tourcoing, France
- 2002 :
  - Predator 360W, Label Noiseuse, La BF15 Gallery, Lyon, France
- 2001 :
  - Film Festival Berlin – Circle of Confusion, Berlin, Germany
  - Playground, Galerie SMM Gianni Motti, Berlin, Germany

=== Performances ===
- 2019:
  - Dismembering Echoes, Galerie Quynh, in collaboration with District 105 Hardcore Metal Local Band, Ho Chi Minh City, Vietnam
- 2017:
  - Live Acoustic Guitar and Vocals (Sad Love Songs in Pop/Ska/Punk Rock) @ Ruby Soho Bar - Phu My Hung, Ho Chi Minh City, Vietnam
- 2015:
  - Icarus Festival, Atavism Electronic Music Production, Mui Ne, Vietnam
  - Kaleidosoup, LMP First VJ International Meeting, Ho Chi Minh City, Vietnam
- 2013:
  - Zero Station, Live Noise Performance Ho Chi Minh City, Vietnam
- 2012:
  - Atavism Electronic AUdio & Visual Live Performances Ho Chi Minh City, Vietnam
  - MOETH Live Performance Vietnam
- 2011:
  - MOETH, live concert-performance Drone – Doom, Hanoi RockCity, Hanoi, Vietnam
- 2010:
  - NTSD Project, sound & visual noise performance, Upstairs Club, Ho Chi Minh City, Vietnam
- 2008 :
  - D.E.A.F. D.E.C.A.D.E., sound performance [Drone Metal] with Nguyen Tien Hung, lead vocal of Black Infinity, Metal Band, Ho Chi Minh City, Vietnam
  - Untitled [Delayed Dust Screens], sound performance at The Cage, LABO WONDERFUL, Ho Chi Minh City, Vietnam
- 2005 :
  - Alien Terri-Stories, sound performance, LMP, Paris, La Goutte d'Or – Nuit Blanche, France
  - WJ'S, web performance, Baubourg, Paris, France
- 2003 :
  - PlayStation versus Csound with Alex Geddie, Confort Moderne Poitiers, France
  - BugN'Mix, CNAC, le Magasin, Grenoble
- 2001 :
  - Miroirs Numériques, concert‐performance Festival 38° Rugissants, Grenoble, France
- 2000 :
  - Sound Improvisation, concert‐performance, le 102, Grenoble, France

== Bibliography ==
- 2016 Online Magazine " Bauer, Alice, Thierry Bernard-Gotteland, www.altescplatform.com, July 2016 (http://www.altescplatform.com/vol2#/thierry/) »
- 2014 Newspapers " DU LÊ, When foreigners play music in Vietnam, THE THAO & VAN HOA CUOI TUAN, Issue No : 35, Vietnam (http://enews.andi.vn/NewsDetail.aspx?3726193.200028982) "
- 2013 Newspapers " My Tran, Invisible Lines tour comes to city, The Saigon Times, March 7, 2013, Ho Chi Minh City, Vietnam "
- 2011 Newspapers " To Van Nga, Heavy metal art, Thanh Nien News, August 12, 2011, Ho Chi Minh City, Vietnam "
- 2011 Newspapers " My Tran, Mythologies of heavy metal at Galerie Quynh, The Saigon Times, July 6, 2011, Ho Chi Minh City, Vietnam "
- Exhibition's Catalogue " Le mois de l'Image, The Fabricated Image »
- Exhibition's Catalogue " Festival 1° Contact, Biennale of Digital Arts »
- Exhibition's Catalogue " Territoire de l'Image, Le Fresnoy, 10 ans de création »
- Exhibition's Catalogue " Panorama 5 – Jamais Vu »
- Exhibition's Catalogue " Panorama 4 – Paysage Persistent »
- Magazine " Archistorm#13 " may-June 2005
