= Le monde en stop =

2009 book by Ludovic Hubler

Le Monde en stop, 5 années à l'école de la vie
- Author: Ludovic Hubler
- Publication date: 2009
- Pages: 409
- ISBN: 978-2-915002-32-4

Le Monde en stop: 5 années à l'école de la vie (English: The World in hitchhiking: 5 years at the school of life) is the first travel book of French traveler Ludovic Hubler, published in 2009 in the Georama edition. A summation of his tour of the world entirely by hitchhiking, which he undertook from 2003 to 2008, the book was awarded the "Prix Pierre Loti", an award given in 2010 to the best travel book of 2009 in France.

== Presentation ==
After graduating from the Business School of Strasbourg in France in June 2002, Hubler began his journey on 1 January, 2003 for what he called his "tour of mankind" or his "life PhD": a tour of the world performed only by hitchhiking.

Hubler hitchhiked by various modes of transport; he hitchhiked across the Sahara Desert, Afghanistan, and Columbia, crossing the Atlantic and Pacific oceans by sailboats and later by an ice-breaker to travel to Antarctica.

During his trip, Hubler met the 14th Dalai-Lama, who received him in his home in Dharamsala, India . He also spoke with thousands of students and professors, giving lectures in various institutions around the world.

Across the 5 years, Hubler traveled 157,000 kilometres (98,000 mi), crossed 59 countries, and gave hundreds of lectures.

== Awards ==
Le Monde en stop was awarded the "Prix Pierre Loti" in 2010, an award given to the best travel book of the year 2009.
