= Damien Luce =

French pianist, actor, and writer (born 1978)

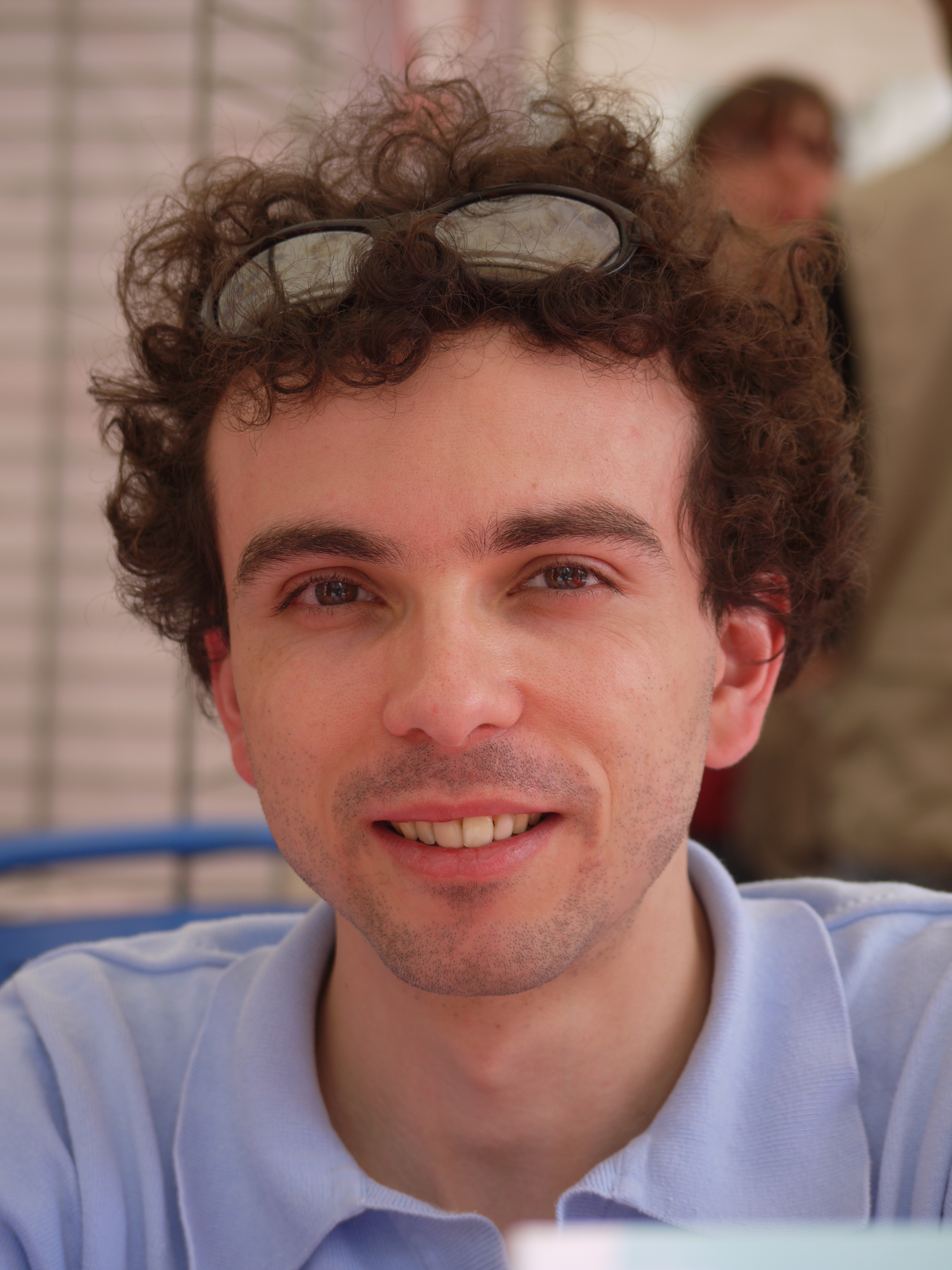
Damien Luce in May 2010

Damien Luce (born 1978) is a French pianist, actor, and writer. He studied with Billy Eidi at the Conservatoire Supérieur de Paris and with Herbert Stessin at the Juilliard School of Music in New York. He also studied chamber music with Bruce Brubaker, Harvey Shapiro and Andre Emilianov, conducting with Laurent Petitgirard and orchestration with Alain Louvier. In 2001, he was chosen to perform for Murray Perahia's Master Class at the Juilliard School. In June 2000, he was an alternate at the Aspen Music Festival concerto competition.

His first album, The Story of Babar - Impressions of Childhood was released in January 2010 (Accord/Universal Classics), followed by Mozart & Haydn - Piano Music, Johann-Sebastian (2012), Bach violin and piano Sonatas (2012, with violinist Gaétan Biron), and Hidden Marvels Of Piano Music (2013).

As a performer, Mr. Luce has given recitals all over the world. Mr. Luce likes to explore unknown works of the piano repertoire and to share his discoveries : his programs include Séverac, Liadov, Kirchner, Mompou as well as more well-known composers such as Chopin, Mozart or Schumann. His passion for literature often leads him to use a poetical theme (Nature, Childhood, Mythology...), in order to combine works from various eras and styles, and to emphasize the links between different forms of art. Damien Luce is also a composer (piano music, melodies).

As an actor, Damien Luce studied at the Alain De Bock drama studio, where he worked on authors such as Racine (Pyrrhus and Oreste in Andromaque), Antiochus in Bérénice), Claudel (Mesa in Le Partage de midi), Marivaux (Arlequin in Arlequin poli par l'amour), Anouilh (The King in Becket) Romains (Knock), Albee (George in Who's Afraid of Virginia Woolf?), Ribes (George in Les Cent Pas). He has experience in musical theater, improvisation and clown (Fabrice Salé). Damien Luce also receives training from the American Academy of Dramatic Arts (New York), where he studies with Steven Ditmyer (Meisner technic), John Baylis (vocal production), Sheila Bandyopadhyay (movement), Lester Shane (voice & speech), Larry Collis (camera acting), Mary Workman (Improvisation). Damien Luce also graduated from the Michael Howard Studios summer conservatory. He studied with David Wells (Voice), Angela Pietropinto (Scene Study), Fay Simpson (Lucid Body), Virginia Scott (Clown), Polina Klimovitskaya (Kinetics), Andrew Shaifer, Gabrielle Berberich (TV and movie acting) and Patsy Rotenburg. Damien Luce is the founder of the Parpadou Theater Company (based in Paris).

Damien Luce is a Novelist. His first Novel, Le Chambrioleur, is published in January 2010 by Heloise d'Ormesson Editions, followed by a second novel in 2012 (Cyrano de Boudou), and a third in 2014 (La Fille de Debussy).

== Bibliography ==
- Damien Luce, Le Chambioleur, Éditions Héloïse d'Ormesson, Paris, 2010, 201 p. (ISBN 978-2350871288)
- Damien Luce, Cyrano de Boudou, Éditions Héloïse d'Ormesson, Paris, 2012, 402 p. (ISBN 978-2350871820)
- Damien Luce, La Fille de Debussy, Éditions Héloïse d'Ormesson, Paris, 2014, 160 p. (ISBN 978-2350872506)

== Discography ==
- La Fontaine, Music for 2 harps
- Johann-Sebastian Bach, sonates pour violon et piano (duo avec Gaétan Biron).
- Mozart & Haydn, piano.
- Histoire de Babar, piano (trio avec Gaétan Biron et Renan Luce).
- Hidden Marvels Of Piano Music, piano.

== Shows ==
- Presque trop sérieux.
- La Fontaine ou les animaux pestiférés.
- Cyrano de Bergerac.
- Monsieur Debussy
- Touches Impressionnistes (de et avec Martial Leroux).
- Bobines (avec Renan Luce).
- Dessine-moi une musique (with visual artist Federico Mozzi)
