= Xavier Depraz =

French actor and singer

Xavier Depraz, né Xavier Marcel Delaruelle (22 April 1926 – 18 October 1994) was a French opera singer and actor.

== Life ==
Born in Albert (Somme), Depraz was a bass at the Paris Opéra until 1971. He took part in the premieres of operas by Marcel Landowski and Sergei Prokofiev. He also appeared as an actor, first on television, where he played the role of Ursus in The Man who laughs by Jean Kerchbron, then on the big screen.

== Career ==
Depraz entered the Conservatoire de Paris in 1947 where he attended the classes of Fernand Francell for singing, Louis Musy for the stage and René Simon for theatre. He participated in the premieres of several operas: Marcel Landowski's Le Rire de Nils Halerius (1951) and Le Fou, Poulenc's Dialogues des Carmélites and, in concert version, Prokofiev's The Fiery Angel (1954). In the 1953 Paris premiere of The Rake's Progress at the Opéra-Comique Depraz was "a splendid Nick Shadow". He also sang in Bartók's Bluebeard's Castle, Verdi's Rigoletto, Mozart's Don Giovanni, Massenet's Don Quichotte and Thaïs among others. For his appearance as Méphistophélès in Monte Carlo in 1959 one reviewer commented "Xavier Depraz, immensely tall, and surprisingly thin and angular for an operatic bass, produced a suitably resonant and cavernous voice, and histrionically was satisfyingly demonic".

He also appeared at the French provincial opera houses, Glyndebourne and Venice, and was appointed a professor of opera at the Conservatoire de Paris in 1973.

In 1971, he began a career as an actor in film and television.

His recordings include Une éducation manquée (Pausanias), Les Pêcheurs de perles (Nourabad), Romeo et Juliette (Frère Laurence), Carmen (Zuniga for Beecham and Haitink), Renard, Dialogues des Carmélites (Le Marquis de la Force) and the Duruflé Requiem.

Depraz died in Saint-Étienne-de-Saint-Geoirs (Isère) on 18 October 1994.

== Discography ==
- 1953: Pausanias in Chabrier's Une Éducation manquée conducted by Charles Bruck (Le Chant du Monde)
- 1953: Nourabad in Bizet's Les Pêcheurs de perles conducted by Jean Fournet (Philips)
- 1954: Basile in excerpts from Le Barbier de Séville with the Opéra-Comique company under Jules Gressier (Pathé)
- 1954: Ariste in Bondeville's L'Ecole des Maris with the Opéra-Comique company under Albert Wolff (Decca - excerpts)
- 1954: Ruprecht in Prokofiev's L'Ange de Feu with the Paris Opera under Charles Bruck (Vega)
- 1958: Marquis de la Force in Poulenc's Dialogues des Carmélites conducted by Pierre Dervaux (Angel)
- 1958: Zuniga in Carmen under Thomas Beecham (HMV)
- 1967: Mephistopheles in excerpts from Faust under Jésus Etcheverry (Vogue)
- 1968: Frère Laurence in Roméo et Juliette under Alain Lombard (EMI)

== Filmography ==
=== Cinema ===
- 1972: Le Droit d'aimer (by Éric Le Hung)
- 1973: L'Emmerdeur (by Édouard Molinaro) – Louis Randoni
- 1973: I Don't Know Much, But I'll Say Everything (by Pierre Richard) – General Deglane
- 1974: Black Thursday (Les Guichets du Louvre) (by Michel Mitrani)
- 1975: Cher Victor (by Robin Davis)
- 1976: Dracula and Son (Dracula père et fils) (by Édouard Molinaro) – Le majordome
- 1976: Le Gang (by Jacques Deray) – Jo
- 1977: Death of a Corrupt Man (Mort d'un pourri) (by Georges Lautner) – Marcel
- 1978: Butterfly on the Shoulder (Un papillon sur l'épaule) (by Jacques Deray) – Miguel Carrabo
- 1978: The Brontë Sisters (by André Téchiné) – Monsieur Hager
- 1981: For a Cop's Hide (Pour la peau d'un flic) (by Alain Delon) – Kasper
- 1985: Carmen with Glyndebourne Opera conducted by Bernard Haitink – Zuniga.

=== Television ===
- 1968: Le Bourgeois gentilhomme (TV Movie, by Pierre Badel) – le Grand Turc
- 1970: L'élixir du R.P. Gaucher (by Pierre Badel) – le prieur à la voix de ténor
- 1971: L'Homme qui rit (by Jean Kerchbron) – Ursus
- 1972: Mauprat (by Jacques Trébouta) – Marcasse / Narcisse
- 1972: The Accursed Kings (by Claude Barma) – Jacques de Molay
- 1973: Vogue la galère (TV Movie, by Raymond Rouleau) – Comité
- 1974: Beau-François (by Roger Kahane) – Pingre #9
- 1982: Le Voyageur imprudent (by Pierre Tchernia) – Méphisto
- 1984: Les Enquêtes du commissaire Maigret (Episode: "Maigret à Vichy", by Alain Levent) – Le commissaire Lecoeur
- 1991: Marie Curie, une femme honorable (by Michel Boisrond) – Anatole France (final appearance)

=== Cartoons ===
- 1978: La Ballade des Dalton (by René Goscinny and Morris) – The cowboy who dodges the train (voice)

== Theatre ==
- 1974: Les Aventures de Tom Jones by Jean Marsan and Jacques Debronckart after Henry Fielding, directed by René Clermont, Théâtre de Paris
