= Sébastien Gondouin =

French footballer (born 1976)

Personal information
- Full name: Sébastien Gondouin
- Date of birth: 15 March 1976 (age 50)
- Place of birth: Créteil, France
- Height: 1.80 m (5 ft 11 in)
- Position: Defender

Senior career*
Years	Team	Apps	(Gls)
2000–2002	US Créteil-Lusitanos	?	(?)
2002–2003	Stade Reims	16	(1)
2003–2008	Tours	83	(2)
2008–2012	US Créteil-Lusitanos	64	(0)
- * Club domestic league appearances and goals

Sébastien Gondouin (born 15 March 1976) is a retired French football defender.
