= Jacques-Olivier Paviot =

French footballer (born 1976)

Jacques Paviot
Personal information
- Full name: Jacques-Olivier Paviot
- Date of birth: 19 December 1976 (age 49)
- Place of birth: Fort-de-France, France
- Height: 1.88 m (6 ft 2 in)
- Position: Centre-back

Youth career
- Paris Saint-Germain

Senior career*
Years	Team	Apps	(Gls)
1999–2000	Mulhouse		
2000–2001	Pau FC		
2001–2002	CO Saint-Dizier		
2002–2004	SO Romorantin		
2004–2006	Skoda Xanthi	57	(4)
2007	Ionikos	14	(0)
2008	Levadiakos	7	(0)
2008–2009	Ilisiakos		
2009–2010	Pau FC		

Managerial career
- 2010–2011: Pau FC
- * Club domestic league appearances and goals

Jacques-Olivier Paviot (born 19 December 1976) is a French former professional footballer who played as a centre-back.

== Playing career ==
Paviot left his native Martinique at the age of 19 to move to Brittany.

He played for Pau FC from December 1999 to June 2001. He had a stint with SO Romorantin.

Paviot spent the latter years of his career in Greece where he achieved celebrity status for his special talent, which was named by the acclaimed Greek radio sports show "Fight Club" as "koukouna".

Paviot had a trial with Scottish side Heart of Midlothian in the 2001–02 season and signed a provisional two-month contract. After sustaining an injury he was not offered a permanent deal. He trained with Livingston in July 2002 and was close to signing permanently but the deal was not finalised.

He re-joined Pau FC in summer 2009 before retiring a year later.

== Coaching career ==
In mid-September 2010 Paviot became coach of the U14 team at Pau FC. In early December he was appointed interim manager of the first team.
