= Yann Pivois =

French cyclist

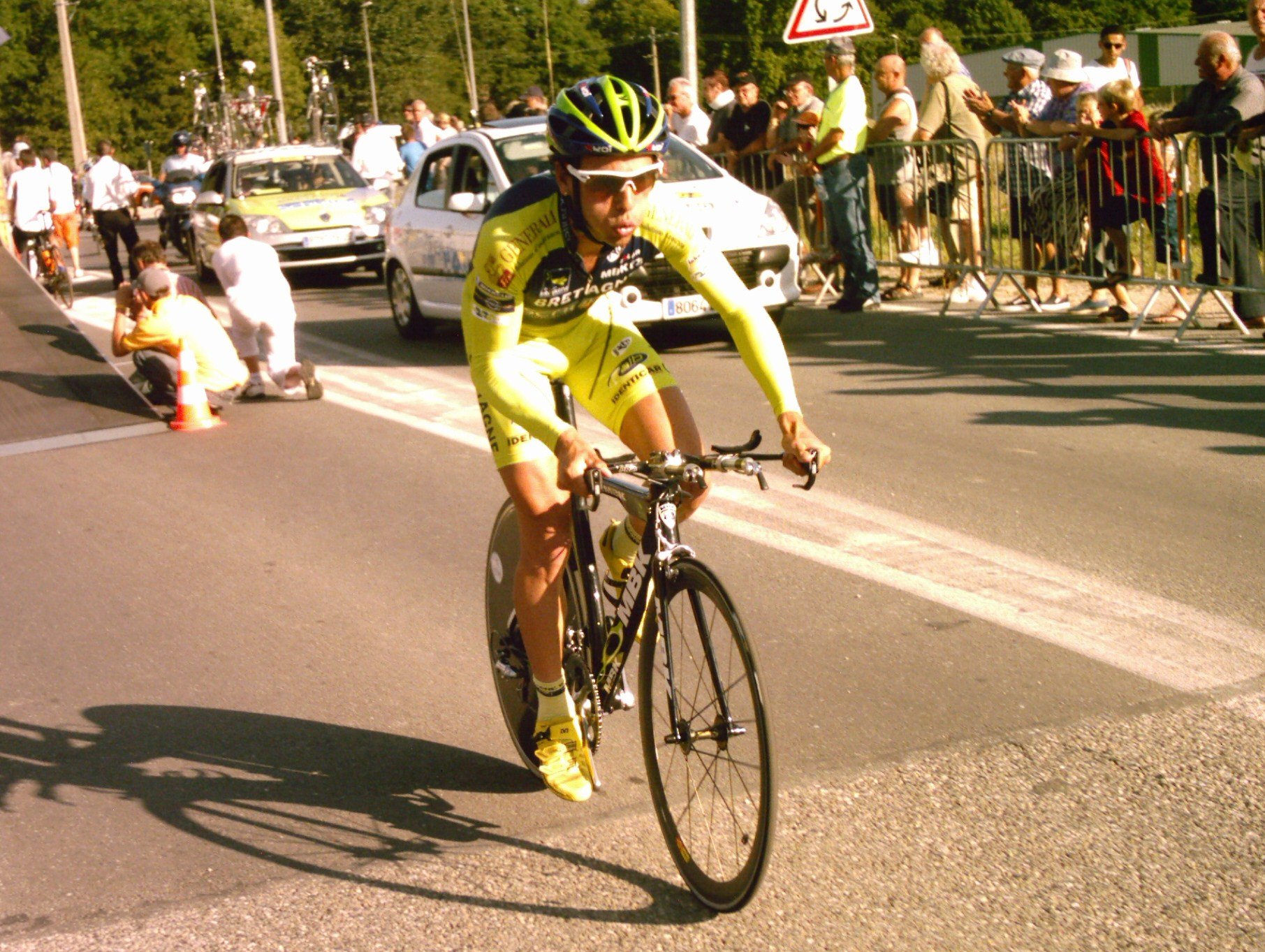
- Yann Pivois (Tour de l'Ain 2009)

Personal information
- Born: 20 January 1976 (age 50)

Cycling career
- Sport: Cycling
- Discipline: Racing
- Role: Rider

Yann Pivois (born 20 January 1976) is a former French professional racing cyclist. Active since 2001, his last professional race was recorded in 2011. Pivois formerly rode for Bretagne Armor Lux, then Bretagne Schuller. In late 2011, it was announced he had left Bretagne Schuller to join VS Chartres cycling club.

== Career highlights ==
2003
2nd in Boucles Catalanes (FRA)
3rd in Prix des Moissons (FRA)

2004
1st in Prix des Moissons (FRA)
3rd in Les Boucles de l'Artois (FRA)
3rd in General Classification Tour du Tarn-et Garonne (FRA)

2005
2nd in Tour du Doubs (FRA)

2008
2nd in General Classification La Tropicale Amissa Bongo (GAB)
