= Armand Raimbault =

French footballer (born 1976)

Personal information
- Full name: Armand Raimbault
- Date of birth: 21 February 1976 (age 50)
- Place of birth: Blois, France
- Position: Goalkeeper

Team information
- Current team: US Orléans
- Number: 1

Senior career*
Years	Team	Apps	(Gls)
1993–2008	Tours FC	345	(35)
2008–	US Orléans	30	
- * Club domestic league appearances and goals as of 17:10, 18 July 2007 (GMT)

Armand Raimbault (born 21 February 1976) is a French football goalkeeper. He currently plays for US Orléans.
