= Isabelle Ebanda =

Cameroonian politician

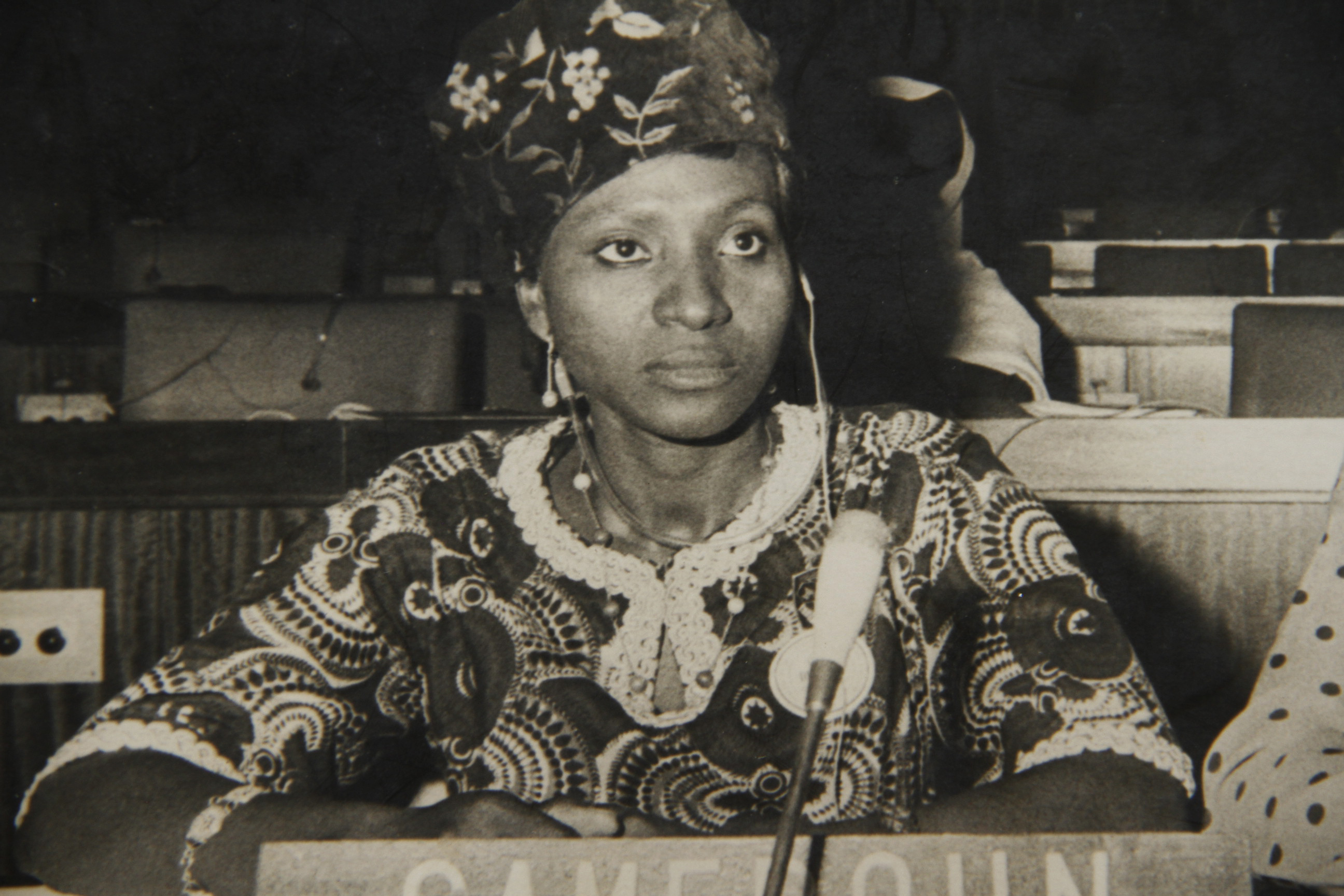

Member of the National Assembly of Cameroon
- In office 1970–1988

Personal details
- Born: 23 February 1936 (age 89) Douala, Cameroon

Isabelle Ebanda (born 23 February 1936) is a Cameroonian politician.

== Early life and education ==
Ebanda was born Isaballe Massoma in Douala on 23 February 1936. She trained as a teacher at Ebolowa Deputy Teacher's Training School. She then obtained a degree from the Lycée General-Leclerc in 1957.

== Career ==
Ebanda began teaching at the Mbanga public school in 1958, then moved to the Lycée des jeans filled de New-Bell in Douala in 1970.

Ebanda joined the Cameroonian Union in 1959 and was a delegate at the party's departmental office in Wouri. When the single party Cameroonian National Union was created in 1966, she became president of its Women's Organisation.

Ebanda was elected as a member of the National Assembly for Wouri in 1970. She was the first woman deputy in the province of Littoral. In 1974, she became a member of the parliamentary committees for finance, constitutional law, education and social affairs. She left the National Assembly in 1988.

In 1988, Ebanda was appointed an Officer in the Europe Division of the Ministry of Foreign Affairs. She was later promoted to Head of Central and Eastern Europe. In 2002, she was appointed president of the National Elections Observatory in Douala.

In 2013, Ebanda was the special guest at a ceremony for reconciliation in Wouri.

== Awards and honours ==
- Order of Merit for Noble Acts for the Preservation of Peace and Concord in Cameroon, 2000
