= Black Infinity =

Vietnamese band

- Origin: Vietnam and California
- Genres: Death metal Doom metal Goth metal
- Years active: 2006 - present
- Label: Independent
- Members: Nguyễn Tiến Hưng Nguyễn Tiến Mẫn; Đặng Thái Sơn; Tiger Vũ; La Cẩm Cường La Cẫm Mãn
- Website: www.666metal.net

Black Infinity is a Vietnamese heavy metal band, formed in 2006 by Nguyễn Tiến Hưng (Hung Blackhearted), Đặng Thái Sơn, Nguyễn Tiến Mẫn (Tiger Nguyen) (Hưng's younger brother), and Tiger Vũ. According to their website, the band plays Death metal, Goth metal and Doom metal. During the time of founding the band, Cường Em also joined them but was later replaced by Phạm Hòang Mỹ (Phệ). By the end of 2006, La Cẩm Mãn entered the band. The band Black Infinity actually originates from California by founder Hung BlackhearteD (who played for the band Sorrow Decadence in South California) recruited his brother Tiến Mẫn (Tiger Nguyen) and Thái Sơn in Vietnam and bassist Tiger Vũ from San Francisco. The group headed back to Vietnam to release the first EP: Apocalyptic via Hehemetal, a popular metal website in Vietnam.

Black Infinity became popular in Vietnam within a year with their top hits.

1. "Embracing hearts"
2. "Lost Angels": Winner of the 2008 Nokia Award Hát Cho Niềm Đam Mê
3. "The Secret": (the song appeared on the Planet Metal compilation of the Metal Hammer magazine in April 2010).

The band released their first album 666 Metal on 18 July 2009, featuring 11 tracks.

In June 2010, Black Infinity were named among the top ten candidates for the first ever held ASEAN Best Band Awards.

In 2011, drummer Hoàng Mỹ was fired from the band due to drug addiction and was replaced by drummer La Cẩm Cường (Keyboard La Cẩm Mãn younger Brother).

In summer 2012, the band released and launched their documentary DVD "Rising From The Dark" at Hardrock Cafe Ho Chi Minh and supported by MTV Viet Nam.

In January 2014, the band released their second album, a double album called "The Illuminati of Love and Death I & II" mastered by Sterling Sound New York engineer Justin Shturtz. And they've worked with the world-famous producer Tim Palmer (U2, Bon Jovi, Ozzy...) After that they released 2 singles "Suicide Romance" and "Young Guns" and become hits on MTV Viet Nam during summer 2014.

Spring of 2015, Hung BlackhearteD launched his Rock fashion line called "The Black Clothing". And Hung BlackhearteD also founder of the rock record label called "Young Guns Records" with his brother Tiger Nguyen is co-founder.

== Band members ==
- Nguyễn Tiến Hưng/Hung BlackhearteD (Vocal)
- Nguyễn Tiến Mẫn/Tiger Nguyen (Guitar)
- Đặng Thái Sơn (Guitar)
- Tiger Vũ (Bassist)
- La Cẫm Cường (Drum)
- La Cẫm Mãn (Keyboard)
