= Boussad Houche =

Algerian footballer

Personal information
- Date of birth: 5 April 1978 (age 48)
- Place of birth: Revin, France
- Height: 1.85 m (6 ft 1 in)
- Positions: Defensive midfielder; centre-back

Senior career*
Years	Team	Apps	(Gls)
1998–1999	Charleville		
1999–2000	Rethel Sportif		
2000–2003	R.O.C.Charleroi-Marchienne		
2003–2005	Reims	29	(0)
2005–2006	APEP Pitsilias		
2006–2008	RES Couvin-Mariembourg-Fraire		
2008–2009	AC Oulu		
2009	MFK Topoľčany		
2010	IFK Mariehamn	7	(0)
2010–2018	RES Couvin-Mariembourg-Fraire		
- * Club domestic league appearances and goals

Boussad Houche (born 5 April 1978) is a former professional footballer who played as a defensive midfielder or centre-back.

== Career ==
Houche was born in Revin, France. After bouncing around several amateur clubs including Olympique de Charleville-Mézières, Revin and Rethel in France, and RES Couvin-Mariembourg in Belgium, he joined Stade Reims in 2002. In his first season with the club, Houche played with the reserve side. In his second season, he was a member of the first team which was playing in the Championnat National, making 8 appearances and helping the team gain promotion to Ligue 2. He went on to make another 21 appearances for the club in Ligue 2 before leaving in 2005.

In the summer of 2005, Houche signed with APEP Pitsilia in the Cypriot First Division. He spent just one season with the club before returning to Belgium to play with RES Couvin-Mariembourg.

He played for IFK Mariehamn in the Veikkausliiga, having spent the 2008–09 season playing as a defender for AC Oulu in the Finnish Ykkönen.
