= Jean-Pierre Simb =

French footballer (born 1974)

Personal information
- Date of birth: 4 September 1974 (age 52)
- Place of birth: Paris, France
- Height: 1.86 m (6 ft 1 in)
- Position: Forward

Senior career*
Years	Team	Apps	(Gls)
–1998	Red Star 93		
1998–1999	Torquay United	20	(1)
- * Club domestic league appearances and goals

Jean-Pierre Simb (born 4 September 1974) is a French former professional footballer who played as a forward.

== Career ==
Simb joined English Division Three side Torquay United in March 1999 from Red Star 93.

He made his league debut at home to Hartlepool United on 27 March 1999 as a 17th-minute substitute for O'Neill Donaldson who went off with a broken leg that was to end his professional career. In the 37th minute Simb set off from just outside the penalty area on a run down the left wing. Eighty yards later, after a number of tricks, he was deep inside the Pool penalty-area. His cross was met by the head of Brian McGorry and fellow debutant, Eifion Williams was on hand to score Torquay's opener in a 3–0 win, with Williams scoring all three goals.

Simb's first goal for Torquay came a month later in a 2–0 win at home to promotion-chasing Rotherham United. Although popular with the fans for his trickery, it was not suited to the harsh realities of Third Division football and he spent much of the remainder of his time at Plainmoor on the substitutes' bench, before being released in February 2000.
