= Éléonore Gosset-Bernheim =

French actress

Éléonore Bernheim also appearing as Éléonore Gosset-Bernheim, (and Éléonore Gosset 2011 and prior) is a French actress who began professional work in the late 1990s.

Gosset-Bernheim is currently starring in the continuing television series L'Art du crime, which airs in the United States and other English-speaking countries on TV5Monde and MHZ Choice. Gosset-Bernheim is a 2003 graduate of the Conservatoire national supérieur d'art dramatique in Paris.

== Works ==
=== In film ===
- Terminale de Francis Girod (1998), playing Caroline
- Kennedy et moi (1999), playing Alice Polaris
- Les Infortunes de la beauté (1999)
- Cyrano (short film, 2000)
- Pas d'histoires! (12 regards sur le racisme au quotidien) (2001), playing Marie ("Cyrano")
- Les Âmes câlines (2001), playing la jeune femme de la piscine, directed by Thomas Bardinet
- Lokarri (2002), directed by Jean Pierre Grasset
- S.A.C.: des hommes dans l'ombre (2004), playing la fille de Routier
- Nos vies rêvées (2004), playing Bénédicte Tassin
- Un truc dans le genre (2005), playing Alice
- Le héros de la famille (2006), playing Véra
- Les Enfants, j'adore! (2006), playing Joséphine
- Jean-Philippe (2006)
- Les Beaux Jours (2013), playing Lise
- Elle l'adore (2014), playing Joueuse de poker (as Éléonore Bernheim)
- Bis (2015), playing la mère de Patrice (as Éléonore Bernheim)
- L'invitation (2015), playing Carine
- Les Infortunes de la beauté (1999), directed by John Lvoff

=== In television ===
- Maigret (season 9,episode 1, 2000), playing Francine Tremblet
- Le Silence de l'épervier (Season 1, 2008), playing Justine Lefort
- L'Art du crime (2017-), playing Florence Chassagne (as Éléonore Bernheim)
- Mort sur la piste (November 2023), playing Sabrina Nedjard
