= Loïc Jean-Albert =

French parachutist (born 1978)

Loïc Jean-Albert (born 8 February 1978 in Toulon, but grew up on Réunion), known as the Flying Dude from a popular YouTube video, Loic is an expert parachutist and wingsuit pilot. He was among the first ever practitioners of the sport of wingsuit BASE jumping. He was also among a group reported in 2007 to be developing and testing a wingsuit for landing without a parachute.
