= Jérémy Hénin =

French footballer (born 1977)

Personal information
- Date of birth: 12 November 1977 (age 48)
- Place of birth: Harfleur, France
- Height: 1.86 m (6 ft 1 in)
- Position: Defender

Youth career
- 1994–1996: Le Havre

Senior career*
Years	Team	Apps	(Gls)
1996–2004	Le Havre	215	(4)
2004–2007	Sedan	90	(2)
2007–2010	Le Havre	98	(1)
2010–2014	Angers	86	(6)
Total		489	(13)
- * Club domestic league appearances and goals

Jérémy Hénin (born 12 November 1977) is a French retired professional footballer who played as a defender.

== Career ==
Born in Harfleur, Seine-Maritime, Hénin began his career with Le Havre, debuting on 8 March 1997 in the 1–0 Ligue 1 win at Lens.

He moved to Sedan in 2004, when the club was in Ligue 2, making his club debut in the 3–0 win against Guingamp on 16 August 2004. Hénin missed just six league games in his first two seasons at Sedan, with the club winning promotion in 2006. He returned to Le Havre in January 2007, where he would win Ligue 2 in 2008.
