= Tours FC =

French football club, 1919–2025

Tours
- Full name: AS Docks du Centre (1919–1921); AS du Centre (1921–1942); US du centre (1942–1951); Tours FC (1951–2025)
- Nickname: TFC
- Founded: 1919
- Dissolved: 26 February 2025
- Ground: Stade de la Vallée du Cher
- Capacity: 16,247

Tours Football Club, commonly referred to as simply Tours (French pronunciation: [tuʁ]), was a football club based in Tours, France. Formed in 1919, the club adopted the name Tours FC in 1951 after several other name changes. The club was dissolved due to years of financial struggles.

Home matches were played the Stade de la Vallée du Cher located within the city.

== History ==
Tours Football Club was founded in 1919 as under the name AS Docks du Centre. After two years of playing under the moniker, the club changed its name to AS du Centre. The club spent 30 years under the name as French football entered professionalism in the 1930s. In 1951, the club changed its name again to the current Tours FC. Under the Tours emblem, the club achieved success in its infancy reaching the Round of 64 in the Coupe de France thanks to player-coach Alfred Aston that same year.

FC Tours historical logo

Tours was promoted to the first division in 1980. Prior to the start of the season, the club signed prolific striker Delio Onnis from Monaco. Onnis improved the club's attack significantly over the next three years and departing the club in 1983 after Tours suffered relegation. During Onnis' stint between 1980 and 1983, Tours twice reached the semi-finals of the Coupe de France in 1982 and 1983. The club was eliminated on both occasions by Paris Saint-Germain. In 1984, Tours quickly returned to the first division after winning Division 2 title. However, after one season, the club returned to the lower league. Tours have yet to manage a return to Ligue 1.

During the club's current absence from Ligue 1, Tours fell to the Championnat National, the third division of French football, after finishing last in the 2006–07 season. During the season, Albert Falette, the club manager for eight years was removed from his position. At the end of the season, the club released or sold almost all its players, including captain David Fleurival. The club only kept long-time goalkeeper Armand Raimbault and young prospect Rudy Wendling. The long-term outlook strategy paid off with the club finishing second in the 2007–08 National season, thus returning to Ligue 2, where the club remained for ten years until relegated to Championnat National following a last place finish in the 2017–18 campaign.

The club were relegated again at the end of the 2018–19 Championnat National season, and were further relegated administratively by the DNCG, confirmed by appeal on 11 July 2019, forcing them to play at the fifth level Championnat National 3 in the 2019–20 season.

In April 2020, after the truncation of the season due to the COVID-19 pandemic, Tours expected to be promoted back to Championnat National 2, due to being placed top of their group at the time the season was stopped. However, on 15 June 2020, The DNCG committee of the FFF denied their promotion. The decision was ratified by the appeal committee on 10 July 2020.

In March 2021, after a season voided by COVID-19, the club announced the opening of a Société coopérative d’intérêt collectif (SCIC) (cooperative shareholding society) with the hope of involving more of the community in the governance of the club. In July 2021, the DNCG committee of the FFF relegated the club to the sixth tier for financial reasons. The result was confirmed on appeal later in the month. They finished top of their division at the end of the 2021–22 season, but the league ruled they were to be denied promotion for financial reasons. The decision was overturned on appeal, and Tours climbed back to National 3.

On 26 February 2025, Tours's liquidation due to financial struggles was confirmed by the French Football Federation. The club's teams were removed from all leagues in France.

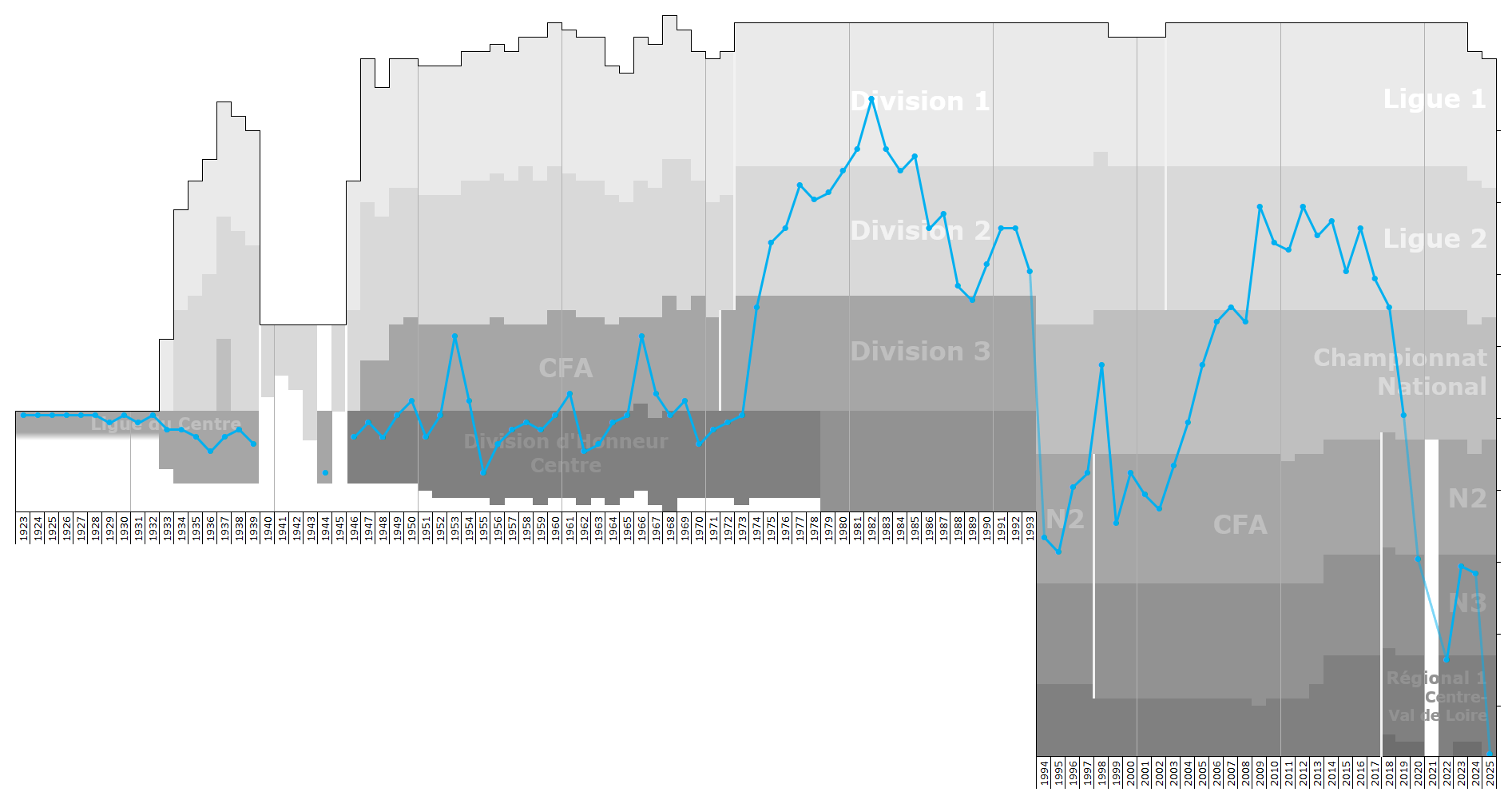
Historical league performance chart of Tours FC

=== After Tours FC ===
Following the liquidation of Tours FC, an ephemerous association was founded under the name of Jeunesse Tours Foot for the previous members of the defunct Tours FC.

On 29 April 2025, it was announced that Football Club de l'Ouest tourangeau, a National 3 club based in the near cities of Ballan-Miré and Savonnières would change its name for Union Foot de Touraine, and would extend its influence to the cities of Tours and Joué-lès-Tours, to compensate for the liquidation of Tours FC and Joué-lès-Tours FCT (liquidated in August 2024). The club reveals its new colours and logo on 2 June 2025.

== Colours and crests ==
Tours Coat of arms

Tours' crest is inspired by the city's coats of arms with three towers and a Fleur-de-lis. It bears the club's motto "Turonorum civitas libera", which means in Latin "Free city of Turones". Turones is the Celtic tribe, which gave its name to Tours. The motto was found engraved on a rock, which is now in the undergrounds of the Beaux Arts Museum located in the city. The salamander is a reference to King François I.

== Notable former players ==
Below are the notable former players who have represented Tours in league and international competition since the club's foundation in 1919. To appear in the section below, a player must have played in at least 80 official matches for the club.

For a complete list of Tours FC players, see Category:Tours FC players.

- (France) Alfred Aston
- (France) Fatih Atık
- (France) Patrice Augustin
- (France) Yves Bertucci
- (France) Julien Cétout
- (France) Olivier Giroud
- (France) Sébastien Gondouin
- (France) Christophe Himmer
- (France) Laurent Koscielny
- (France) Frédéric Laurent
- (France) Guy Lacombe
- (France) Christophe Mandanne
- (France) Michel Rodriguez
- (France) Youssouf Touré
- (Argentina) Omar da Fonseca
- (Argentina) Delio Onnis
- (Belgium) Gaëtan Englebert
- (Benin) Jean-Marc Adjovi-Bocco
- (Guadeloupe) Cédric Collet
- (Guadeloupe) David Fleurival
- (Liechtenstein) Peter Jehle
- (Togo) Antoine Dossevi

== Managers ==
- Alfred Aston (1951–56)
- Jules Vandooren (1961–62)
- Stanislas Dombeck (1964–67)
- Yvon Jublot (1969–76)
- Pierre Phelipon (1976–81)
- Hennie Hollink (1981–83)
- Guy Briet (1983 – March 85)
- Serge Besnard (March 1985–86)
- Yvon Jublot (1986–88)
- Jean Sérafin (1988–92)
- Raymond Kéruzoré (1992–93)
- Philippe Leroux (1993–95)
- Christian Letard (1995 – March 99)
- Albert Falette (March 1999–07)
- Philippe Bizeul (2007)
- Daniel Sanchez (2007 – 11 June)
- Peter Zeidler (June 2011 – 12 Aug)
- Bernard Blaquart (Aug 2012–13)
- Olivier Pantaloni (2013–14)
- Alexandre Dujeux (interim) (2014–15)
- Gilbert Zoonekynd (2015)
- Marco Simone (2015–16)
- Fabien Mercadal (2016–17)
- Gilbert Zoonekynd (2017)
- Jorge Costa (2017–2018)
- René Lobello (2018–2019)
- Michel Estevan (2019)
- Nourredine El Ouardani (2019–2024)
- Bryan Bergougnoux (2024–2025)
