= Patrick Regnault =

French footballer (born 1974)

Personal information
- Date of birth: 31 March 1974 (age 52)
- Place of birth: Villers-Semeuse, France
- Height: 1.80 m (5 ft 11 in)
- Position: Goalkeeper

Senior career*
Years	Team	Apps	(Gls)
1994–1997	OFC Charleville	39	(0)
1997–1998	Saint-Denis-Saint-Leu	34	(0)
1998–1999	Le Mans	29	(0)
1999–2009	Sedan	268	(0)
Total		370	(0)
- * Club domestic league appearances and goals

Patrick Regnault (born 31 March 1974 in Villers-Semeuse) is a French former professional footballer who played as a goalkeeper.
