= Yoann Bouchard =

French footballer (born 1976)

Personal information
- Full name: Yoann Bouchard
- Date of birth: December 1, 1976 (age 49)
- Place of birth: La Charité-sur-Loire, France
- Height: 1.86 m (6 ft 1 in)
- Position: Goalkeeper

Senior career*
Years	Team	Apps	(Gls)
1996–1999	Auxerre	0	(0)
1999–2000	Grenoble	18	(0)
2000–2002	Nîmes	39	(0)
2002–2003	AS Cannes	13	(0)
2003–2005	Clermont Foot	6	(0)
2005–2006	Racing de Ferrol	36	(0)
2006–2008	Elche	3	(0)
2008–2010	Besançon RC	28	(0)
- * Club domestic league appearances and goals

Yoann Bouchard (born 1 December 1976) is a French former footballer who played as a goalkeeper. He last played for Besançon Racing Club until the end of the 2009-10 season. He previously appeared in Ligue 2 for Nîmes and Clermont Foot and the Spanish Segunda División for Racing de Ferrol and Elche.
