= Mickael Marquet =

French footballer (born 1981)

Mickael Marquet (born 10 December 1981 in Alfortville, France) is a French former professional footballer who played as a forward. He made five appearances in Ligue 1 for Ajaccio in the 2002–03 season and made 16 appearances and scored two goals in Ligue 2 for Creteil in the 2001–02 season.
