= Christophe Himmer =

French footballer (born 1976)

Personal information
- Full name: Christophe Himmer
- Date of birth: 22 January 1976 (age 50)
- Place of birth: Paris, France
- Height: 1.70 m (5 ft 7 in)
- Position: Midfielder

Senior career*
Years	Team	Apps	(Gls)
2000–2001	Levallois SC	?	(?)
2001–2002	Stade Rennais	?	(?)
2002–2004	Nîmes Olympique	?	(?)
2004–2007	Tours	76	(3)
2007–2008	Sète 34	13	(0)
- * Club domestic league appearances and goals

Christophe Himmer (born 22 January 1976) is a retired French footballer who played as a midfielder.
