= Maurice Barrier =

French actor (1932–2020)

- Born: Maurice-Jean-Étienne Barrier; 8 June 1932; Malicorne-sur-Sarthe, France
- Died: 12 April 2020 (aged 87); Montbard, France
- Occupations: Actor, singer
- Years active: 1965–2008
- Spouse: Hélène Manesse

Maurice Barrier (8 June 1932 – 12 April 2020) was a French actor and singer.

== Biography ==
Barrier was the son of a cabinetmaker and had his first job working in his father's workshop. While living in Rennes at age 28, he met several resident actors at the Théâtre National de Bretagne and made his stage debut in Caligula, written by Albert Camus.

His first major role on television was in the film The Taking of Power by Louis XIV. His other major films included The Tall Blond Man with One Black Shoe, Two Men in Town, Black and White in Color, Coup de tête, and Flic Story. He played alongside several actors, such as Jean-Paul Belmondo, Jean Gabin, Alain Delon, Pierre Richard, Gérard Depardieu, and Gérard Jugnot.

In 1980 he originated the role of Jean Valjean in ‘Les Miserables: The Original French Concept Album’ by Alain Boublil and Claude-Michel Schönberg.

Barrier was married to the actress Hélène Manesse. The pair resided in Montréal, France from 1962 until Maurice's death on 12 April 2020 in Montbard at the age of 87 due to COVID-19.
