= Ludovic Hubler =

French traveller

- Born: 11 September 1977 (age 49); Bar-le-Duc, Meuse
- Writing career
- Notable work: Le Monde en stop
- Notable awards: Pierre Loti; 2010
- Height: 1.88 m (6 ft 2 in)

Ludovic Hubler is a French traveller and author. He achieved notoriety for his five-year long tour of the world, completed entirely by hitchhiking. He wrote the travel book Le Monde en stop, and later received the 2010 Pierre Loti Award.

== Biography ==
=== Childhood ===
Ludovic Hubler was born on 11 September 1977, the son of Monique and Jacques Hubler. He is the brother of the consultant Eric Hubler and the photographer Marc Hubler. Passionate about football and geography, he grew up in Wasselonne and Obernai in the Alsace region in eastern France. In June 2002, he graduated from EM Strasbourg Business School with a Master of Science in Management.

=== Tour of the world by hitchhiking ===
At the end of his master's program, believing that discovering the realities of the world was a valuable pre-requisite to entering the work world, Ludovic Hubler decided to start a tour of the world using hitchhiking as his only means of transportation.

This adventure, which he baptized his, "life PhD", lasted 5 years during 2003-2008. From "sail-boat hitchhiking" to cross the Atlantic and the Pacific, to "ice breaker hitchhiking" to reach Antarctica; from crossing the Sahara Desert or visiting countries as notorious as Colombia and Afghanistan, Ludovic used his thumb in all kinds of improbable and difficult to imagine situations.

His encounters were as numerous as they were diverse. Among the most striking were his meeting with the 14th Dalai Lama, who received him in his hometown of Dharamshala (India) in 2007, and some of the thousands of students in all corners of the world with whom he shared his story.

Over the course of 5 years, the 170,000 kilometers travelled, the 59 countries visited, the hundreds of lectures given, and the help of over 1,300 drivers give an idea of Ludovic's trip - an adventure that was shared on a daily basis with pediatric cancer patients at the Hospital of Strasbourg, back home in Strasbourg, France.

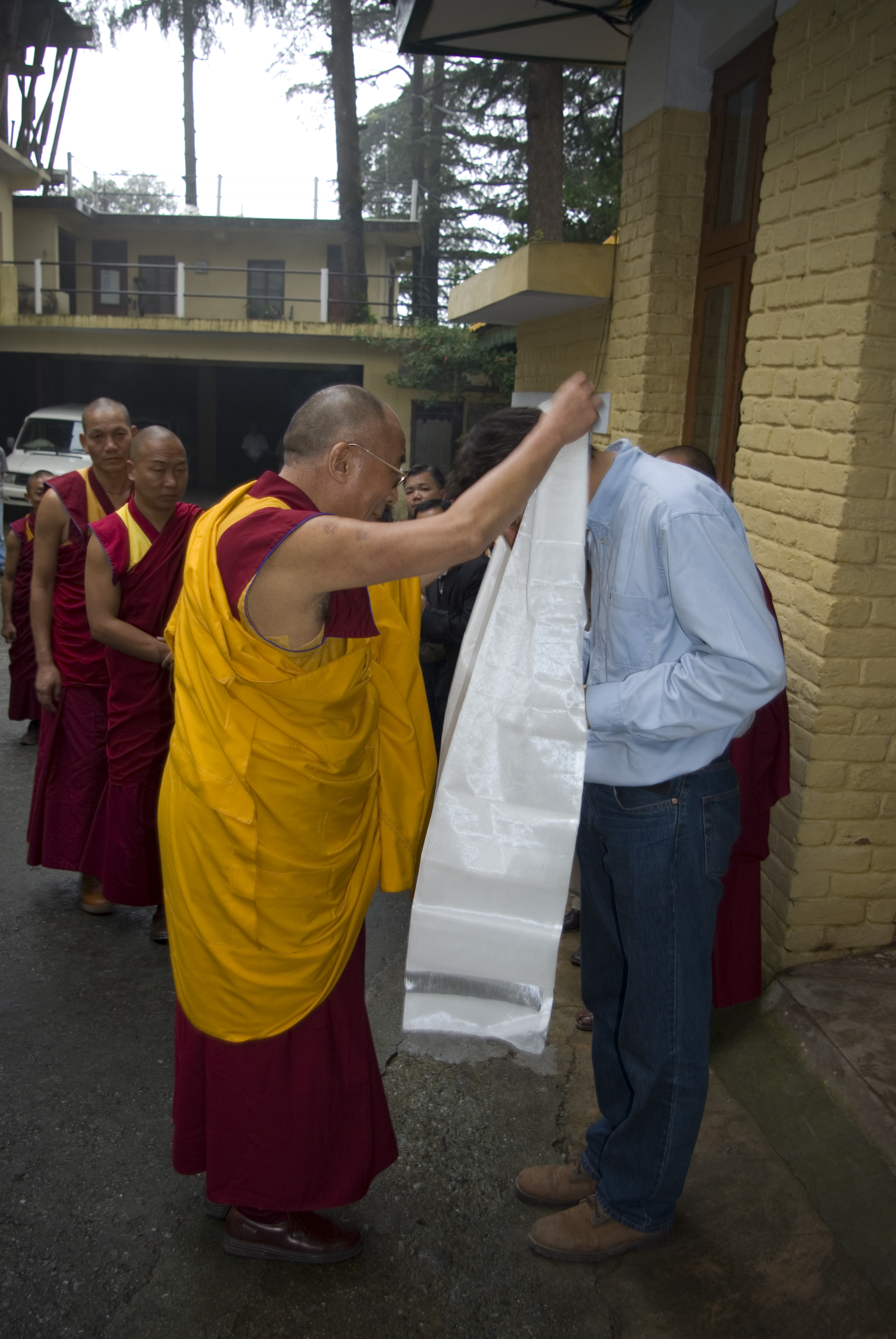
The 14th Dalai Lama giving Ludovic a khata

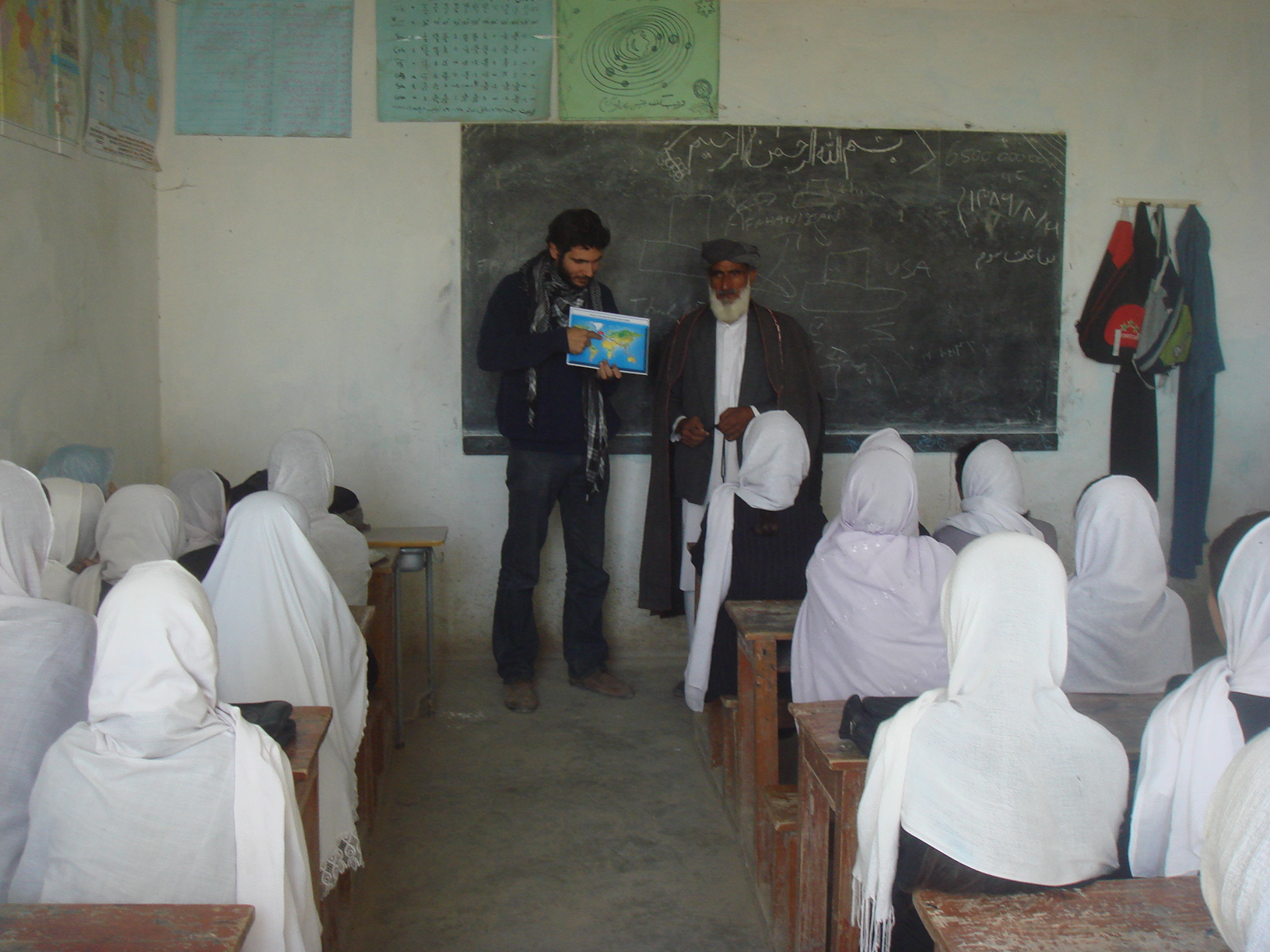
Sharing his journey in a school in Afghanistan

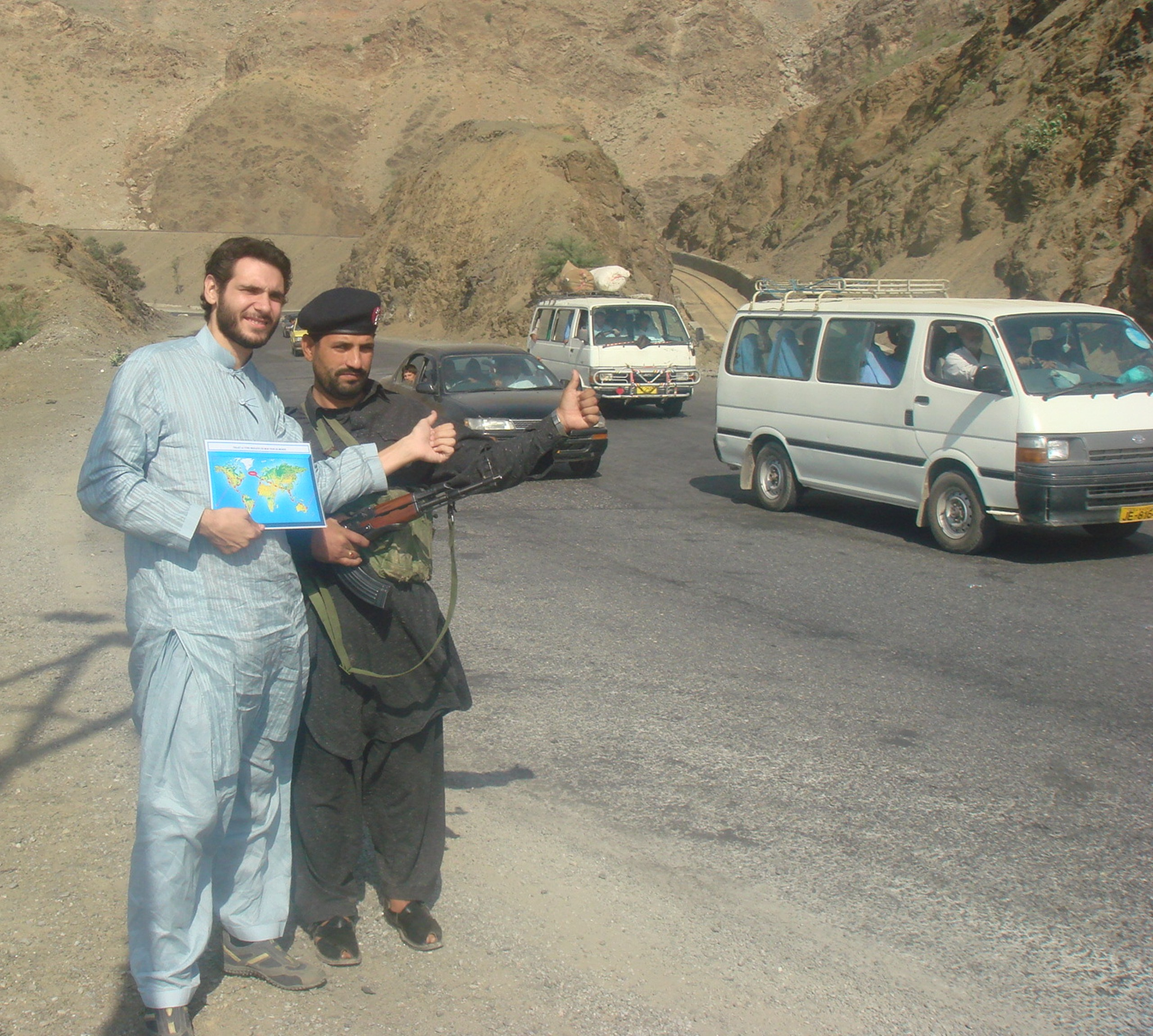
Hitchhiking in the tribal zones of Pakistan near the Afghan border

=== After the tour ===
Ludovic Hubler now lives in Menton and works as Head of Programmes and Field Operations for Peace and Sport, L'organisation pour la paix par le sport placed under the High Patronage of Prince Albert II of Monaco.

He continues to regularly give lectures sharing his journey and what he learned on the road. Ludovic Hubler is now married to Panamanian native Marisol Richards Espinosa, whom he met during the trip in September 2005, as he hitchhiked through Panama.

== Bibliography ==
- 2009 : Le Monde en stop, 5 années à l'école de la vie, éditions Géorama. 2010 Pierre Loti award, rewarding the best travel book of the year 2009.
