= Frédéric Danjou =

French footballer (born 1974)

Personal information
- Date of birth: 28 September 1974 (age 52)
- Place of birth: Clamart, France
- Height: 1.85 m (6 ft 1 in)
- Position: Defender

Senior career*
Years	Team	Apps	(Gls)
1994–1999	Auxerre	109	(4)
1999–2001	Oviedo	70	(4)
2001–2003	Troyes	42	(0)
2003–2004	Ajaccio	37	(1)
2004–2005	Caen	31	(0)
2005–2006	Ajaccio	23	(0)
2006–2007	Créteil	27	(0)
2006–2007	Gazélec Ajaccio	58	(0)
Total		397	(9)
- * Club domestic league appearances and goals

Frédéric Danjou (born 28 September 1974) is a French former professional footballer who played as a defender.
