= Roland Bertin =

French actor (1930–2024)

- Born: 16 November 1930; Paris, France
- Died: 20 February 2024 (aged 93); Pont-l'Abbé, France
- Occupation: Actor
- Years active: 1970–2024

Roland Bertin (16 November 1930 – 20 February 2024) was a French stage and film actor. He appeared in at least 100 films and television shows from 1970 onwards. Bertin died on 20 February 2024, at the age of 93.

== Selected filmography ==
- Le Petit théâtre de Jean Renoir (1970) (a.k.a. The Little Theatre of Jean Renoir)
- Section spéciale (1970)
- Le Petit Marcel (1976) (a.k.a. Little Marcel)
- Monsieur Klein (1976)
- Madame Claude (1977) (a.k.a. The French Woman)
- Le Gang (1977)
- Butterfly on the Shoulder (1978)
- Les Sœurs Brontë (1979) (a.k.a. The Bronte Sisters)
- La Femme flic (1980) (a.k.a. The Woman Cop)
- Diva (1981)
- La Truite (1982) (The Trout)
- L'Homme blessé (1983) (a.k.a. The Wounded Man)
- Charlotte for Ever (1986) as Leon
- Jenatsch (1987)
- Le Mari de la coiffeuse (1990) (a.k.a. The Hairdresser's Husband)
- Cyrano de Bergerac (1990)
- La Fille de l'air (1992)
- Enfermés dehors (2006)
