= Younous Oumouri =

Malagasy footballer (born 1975)

Personal information
- Full name: Younous Oumouri
- Date of birth: August 30, 1975 (age 51)
- Place of birth: Saint-Pierre, Réunion
- Position: Centre back

Youth career
- 1992–1995: Jeanne D'arc
- 1991–1992: SC Montredon Bonneveine
- 1992–1995: Marseille

Senior career*
Years	Team	Apps	(Gls)
1995–1998	AS Chaudron		
1999	FC Martigues	10	(0)
1999–2000	KSV Zottegem	20	(3)
2000–2001	RWD Molenbeek	31	(2)
2001–2002	KSK Beveren		
2002–2005	KSK Ronse	87	(0)
2005–2008	FCV Dender	77	(0)
2008–2009	Apollon Kalamarias	30	(1)
2009–2010	Egaleo	31	(0)

International career
2003–2006	Madagascar	8	(2)
- * Club domestic league appearances and goals

Younous Oumouri (born 30 August 1975) is a Malagasy retired footballer who played as a centre back. Formerly, he played for Dender in Belgium and Apollon Kalamarias F.C. in Greece. He also played for FC Martigues (1998–99).
