= Éric Sitruk =

French footballer (born 1978)

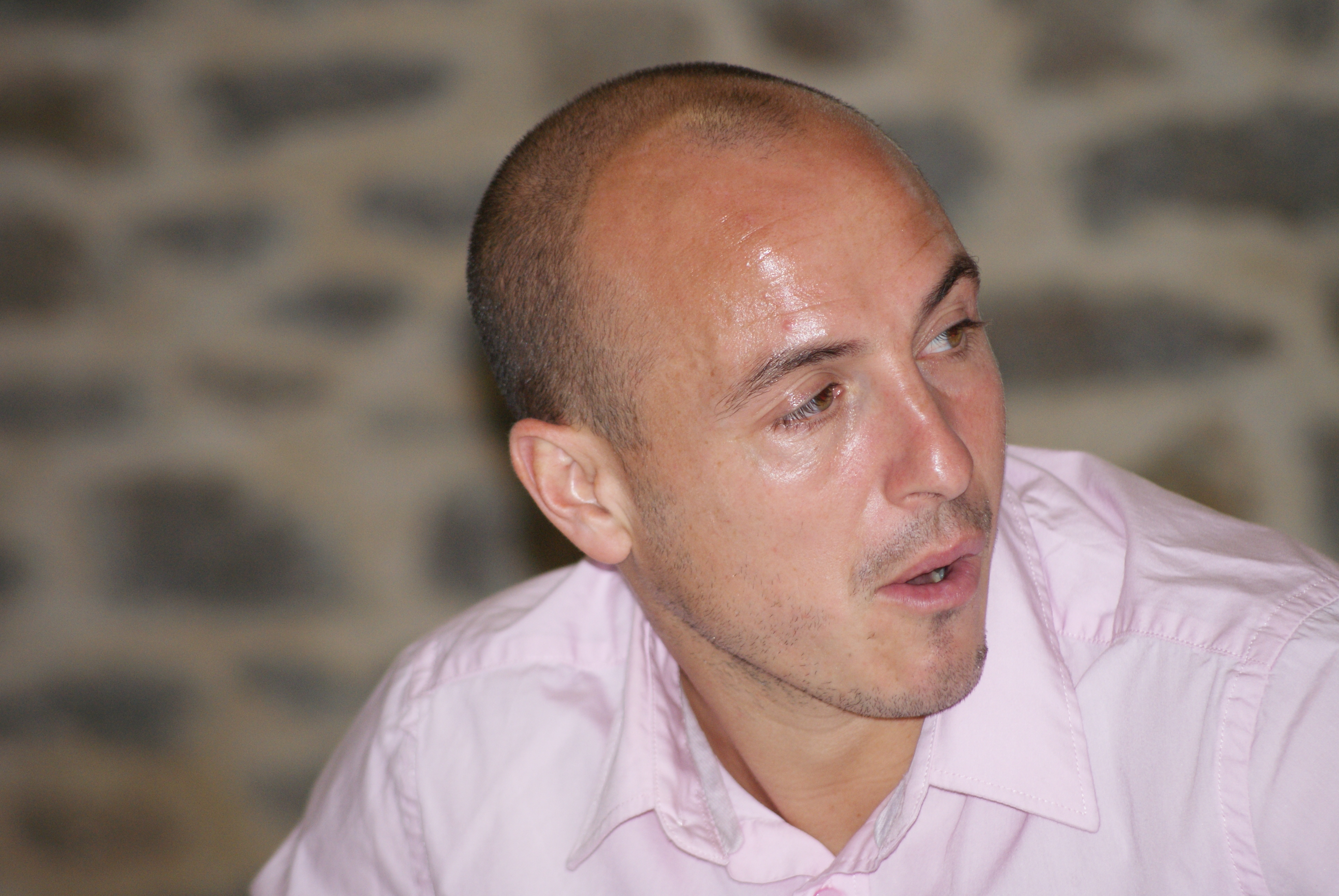

Personal information
- Date of birth: 14 January 1978 (age 48)
- Place of birth: Bondy, France
- Height: 1.62 m (5 ft 4 in)
- Position: Striker

Youth career
- 1995–1997: SM Caen II

Senior career*
Years	Team	Apps	(Gls)
1997–2001	Stade Lavallois	67	(3)
2001–2002	→ Paris FC (loan)	32	(5)
2002–2004	FC Rouen	34	(2)
2004–2005	Entente SSG	31	(6)
2005–2007	En Avant Guingamp	49	(2)
2007–2010	Stade Brest 29	68	(9)
- * Club domestic league appearances and goals as of 1 August 2008

Éric Sitruk (born 14 January 1978) is a French football striker who last played for Stade Brestois 29.

== Statistics ==
Season	Club	Competition	Matches	Goals
1997–98	Stade Lavallois	Ligue 2	1	0
1998–99	Stade Lavallois	Ligue 2	11	0
1999–00	Stade Lavallois	Ligue 2	31	3
2000–01	Stade Lavallois	Ligue 2	16	0
2001–02	Paris FC	CFA		
2002–03	FC Rouen	Championnat National	19	4
2003–04	FC Rouen	Ligue 2	33	2
2004–05	L'Entente SSG	Championnat National	33	6
2005–06	En Avant de Guingamp	Ligue 2	24	2
2006–07	En Avant de Guingamp	Ligue 2	22	0
2007–10	Stade Brestois 29	Ligue 2	59	5
Total			221	19

Updated 2 May 2010
