= 1976 French cantonal elections =

Cantonal elections to renew the general councillors of cantons were held in France on 7 and 14 March 1976. The left won a convincing victory, the PS gained 194 seats and the PCF 75. 15 presidencies also swung to the left.

== Electoral system ==
The cantonales elections use the same system as the regional or legislative elections. There is a 10% threshold (10% of registered voters) needed to proceed to the second round.

== National results ==
Runoff results missing

Party/Alliance	Acronym	% (first round)	Seats
Socialist Party	PS	26.6%	513
French Communist Party	PCF	22.8%	242
Miscellaneous right	DVD	12.5%	269
Reformist Movement-Centrists	DVC	11.8%	250
Union of Democrats for the Republic	UDR	10.6%	171
Independent Republicans	RI	8.5%	175
Miscellaneous left	DVG	4%	93
Radical Party of the Left	MRG	2.4%	84
Far-Left	–	0.7%	4

== Sources ==
- Alain Lancelot, Les élections sous la Ve République, PUF, Paris, 1988
