= Aboubacar Sankharé =

French footballer (born 1978)

Personal information
- Date of birth: 17 January 1978 (age 47)
- Place of birth: Paris, France
- Height: 1.80 m (5 ft 11 in)
- Position(s): Left-back

Senior career*
Years	Team	Apps	(Gls)
1995–1999	Lens		
1999	Toulouse	10	(0)
1999–2002	Créteil		
2003–2004	Fortuna Düsseldorf		
2005–2006	TuRU Düsseldorf	9	(1)
2007	GFC Düren	9	(0)
2008	CF		
- * Club domestic league appearances and goals

Aboubacar Sankharé (born 17 January 1978) is a French former professional footballer who played as a left-back, appearing in 14 matches in Ligue 1 for clubs Lens and Toulouse in the period of 1997–1999 and 19 matches in Ligue 2 for club Créteil in the period of 1999–2002. He also played for Fortuna Düsseldorf in the Regionalliga.

== Personal life ==
Born in France, Sankharé is of Malian descent.
