= Marc Boutruche =

French footballer (born 1976)

Personal information
- Date of birth: 19 September 1976 (age 50)
- Place of birth: Lorient, France
- Height: 1.78 m (5 ft 10 in)
- Position: Defender

Senior career*
Years	Team	Apps	(Gls)
1997–1999	Plabennec	63	(0)
1999–2002	Brest	96	(3)
2002–2009	Lorient	126	(0)
Total		285	(3)
- * Club domestic league appearances and goals

Marc Boutruche (born 19 September 1976) is a French former professional footballer who played as a defender.

His career began in 1994 with Championnat de France Amateurs side Plabennec. He stayed there for five years before he moved to Brest in 1999, where he played for three seasons before joining the then Ligue 2 side Lorient in 2002. He retired in 2009.
