= Hervé Ebanda =

French footballer (born 1979)

Hervé Ebanda (born 14 February 1979 in Créteil) is a French former professional footballer who played as a forward on the professional level for the French Ligue 2 US Créteil-Lusitanos football club between 2000 and 2002.
