= Cédric Duchesne =

French footballer (born 1975)

Personal information
- Full name: Cédric Duchesne
- Date of birth: 12 October 1975 (age 51)
- Place of birth: Caen, France
- Height: 1.85 m (6 ft 1 in)
- Position: Goalkeeper

Senior career*
Years	Team	Apps	(Gls)
1997–1999	Istres	70	(0)
1999–2002	Créteil-Lusitanos	47	(0)
2002–2008	Nîmes Olympique	146	(0)
2008	Martigues	12	(0)
2008–2009	Uzès	?	(?)
- * Club domestic league appearances and goals

Cédric Duchesne (born 12 October 1975) is a retired French football goalkeeper.

His previous clubs include FC Istres, US Créteil-Lusitanos and FC Martigues.
