= 1904 in France =

- Decades: 1880s; 1890s; 1900s; 1910s; 1920s
- See also: History of France; Timeline of French history; List of years in France

Events from the year 1904 in France.

== Incumbents ==
- President: Émile Loubet
- President of the Council of Ministers: Emile Combes

== Events ==
- 23 February - First launch of a French diesel-powered submarine, Aigrette.
- 8 April - Entente cordiale, a series of agreements signed between the United Kingdom and France.
- Global cosmetics companies are founded in Paris: Coty, by François Coty, and Garnier, by Alfred Amour Garnier.
- Summer - Henri Matisse paints Luxe, Calme et Volupté at Saint-Tropez; it will be considered foundational in his own oeuvre and the starting point of Fauvism.

== Literature ==
- Léon Frapié - La Maternelle
- Jules Verne
  - Un drame en Livonie
  - Maître du monde

== Music ==
- Claude Debussy
  - Deux danses
  - Masques
  - L'isle joyeuse
- Gabriel Fauré - Impromptu No. 6
- Jules Massenet - Cigale
- Camille Saint-Saëns - Caprice andalou
- Maurice Ravel
  - String Quartet
  - Shéhérazade
- Erik Satie
  - La Diva de l'Empire
  - Le Piccadilly

== Sport ==
- 2 July - The second Tour de France begins.
- 24 July - Tour de France ends, won by Henri Cornet.

== Births ==
=== January to March ===
- 7 January - Pierre Allain, climber (died 2000)
- 13 January - Jean de Beaumont, sport shooter (died 2002)
- 14 January - Henri-Georges Adam, engraver and sculptor (died 1967)
- 4 February - Georges Sadoul, journalist and cinema writer (died 1967)
- 11 February - Lucile Randon, supercentenarian (died 2023)
- 15 February - Louis Robert, historian and author (died 1985)
- 24 February - Gaston Marie Jacquier, Roman Catholic prelate (died 1976)
- 27 February - André Leducq, cyclist, twice Tour de France winner (died 1980)
- 1 March - Paul Dubreil, mathematician (died 1994)
- 13 March - René Dumont, agronomist, sociologist and environmental politician (died 2001)

=== April to June ===
- 12 April - Arsène Alancourt, cyclist (died 1965)
- 13 April - Yves Congar, priest and theologian (died 1995)
- 21 April
  - Jean Hélion, painter and author (died 1987)
  - Gabriel Loire, stained glass artist (died 1996)
- 25 April - René Cogny, General (died 1968)
- 17 May
  - Marie-Anne Desmarest, novelist (died 1973)
  - Jean Gabin, actor (died 1976)
- 18 May - François Marty, Roman Catholic Cardinal (died 1994)
- 19 May - Daniel Guérin, anarchist and author (died 1988)
- 25 May - Marcel Thil, world champion boxer (died 1968)
- 5 June – Edith Clark, aviator and parachutist (died 1937)
- 8 June - Jean-Jérôme Adam, Roman Catholic Archbishop of Libreville (died 1981)
- 11 June - Gaston Charlot, chemist (died 1994)
- 29 June - Jean Berveiller, composer and organist (died 1976)

=== July to September ===
- 2 July - René Lacoste, tennis player (died 1996)
- 8 July - Henri Cartan, mathematician. (died 2008)
- 24 July - Leo Arnaud, composer of film scores (died 1991)
- 4 September - Christian-Jaque, filmmaker (died 1994)
- 7 September - Henri Pinault, Roman Catholic Bishop of Chengdu (died 1987)
- 18 September - Jean Dasté, actor and theatre director (died 1994)

=== October to December ===
- 8 October - Yves Giraud-Cabantous, motor racing driver (died 1973)
- 13 October - Antoine Gilles Menier, businessman and municipal politician (died 1967)
- 14 October - Christian Pineau, French Resistance leader and politician (died 1995)
- 12 November
  - Henri-Irénée Marrou, historian (died 1977)
  - Jacques Tourneur, film director (died 1977)
- 22 November - Louis Néel, physicist, the Nobel Prize for Physics in 1970 (died 2000)
- 6 December - Ève Curie, author and writer, daughter of Marie and Pierre Curie (died 2007)
- 12 December - Nicolas de Gunzburg, magazine editor (died 1981)
- 21 December - Jean René Bazaine, painter, stained glass window designer and writer (died 2001)
- 31 December - Charles Fauvel, aircraft designer (died 1979)

=== Full date unknown ===
- Raymond Molinier, Trotskyist (died 1994)

== Deaths ==
- 10 January - Jean-Léon Gérôme, painter and sculptor (born 1824)
- 26 January - Émile Deschanel, author and politician (born 1819)
- 3 February - Marie Firmin Bocourt, zoologist and artist (born 1819)
- 19 May - Auguste Molinier, historian (born 1851)
- 27 June - Anatole Jean-Baptiste Antoine de Barthélemy, archaeologist and numismatist (born 1821)
- 25 August - Henri Fantin-Latour, painter and lithographer (born 1836)
- 23 September - Émile Gallé, artist (born 1846)
- 4 October - Frédéric Bartholdi, sculptor, designer of the Statue of Liberty (born 1834)

=== Full date unknown ===
- Paul Adolphe Marie Prosper Granier de Cassagnac, journalist and politician (born 1843)

== See also ==
- List of French films before 1910
