= Melinite =

Melinite or Mélinite may refer to:

- Picric acid
- Jane Avril (1868–1943) La Mélinite, French cabaret star and can-can dancer
