= Shercliff =

Shercliff is a surname. Notable people with the surname include:

- Jose Shercliff (1902–1985), British journalist
- Simon Shercliff (born 1972), British diplomat
