= May Belfort =

Irish Singer, Actress, Comedian

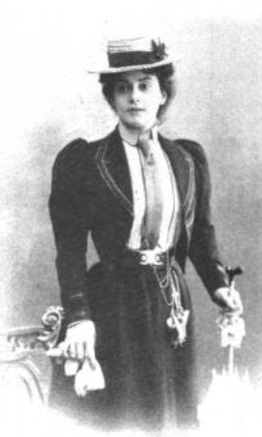
- In The Sketch, 7 September 1898
- Born: May Egan c. 1872; Ireland
- Died: 1929; United States
- Occupations: Cabaret singer, actress, comedian

May Belfort (née Egan; c. 1872 – 1929) was an Irish singer, actress and comedian who was famous across Europe and America.

== Biography ==
Born in Ireland in about 1872, she was a comedian and singer on the London music halls and then in Paris where she performed her trademark nonsensical songs at the café des Décadents and the Petit Casino. She commissioned the famous 1895 Henri de Toulouse-Lautrec poster showing her wearing the red dress with her ever present black cat. She became a favourite of the artist who painted her more than once. She performed in Russia, South Africa and the United States during her career. Belfort was friends with Jane Avril. The British born dancer May Milton was her lover, as was Boer General Ben Viljoen. In fact Belfort expected to marry Viljoen. When it turned out he was already married and unwilling to continue the relationship with her, she traveled to Chicago and horsewhipped him in the street. He later achieved a divorce, but he then married another woman.

== Retiring ==
Belfort retired from the stage due to ill health. Due to bad investments in mining, Belfort lost her money and ended working as a rug weaver and living in poverty. She died after a lingering illness in the United States in 1929.

== Gallery ==
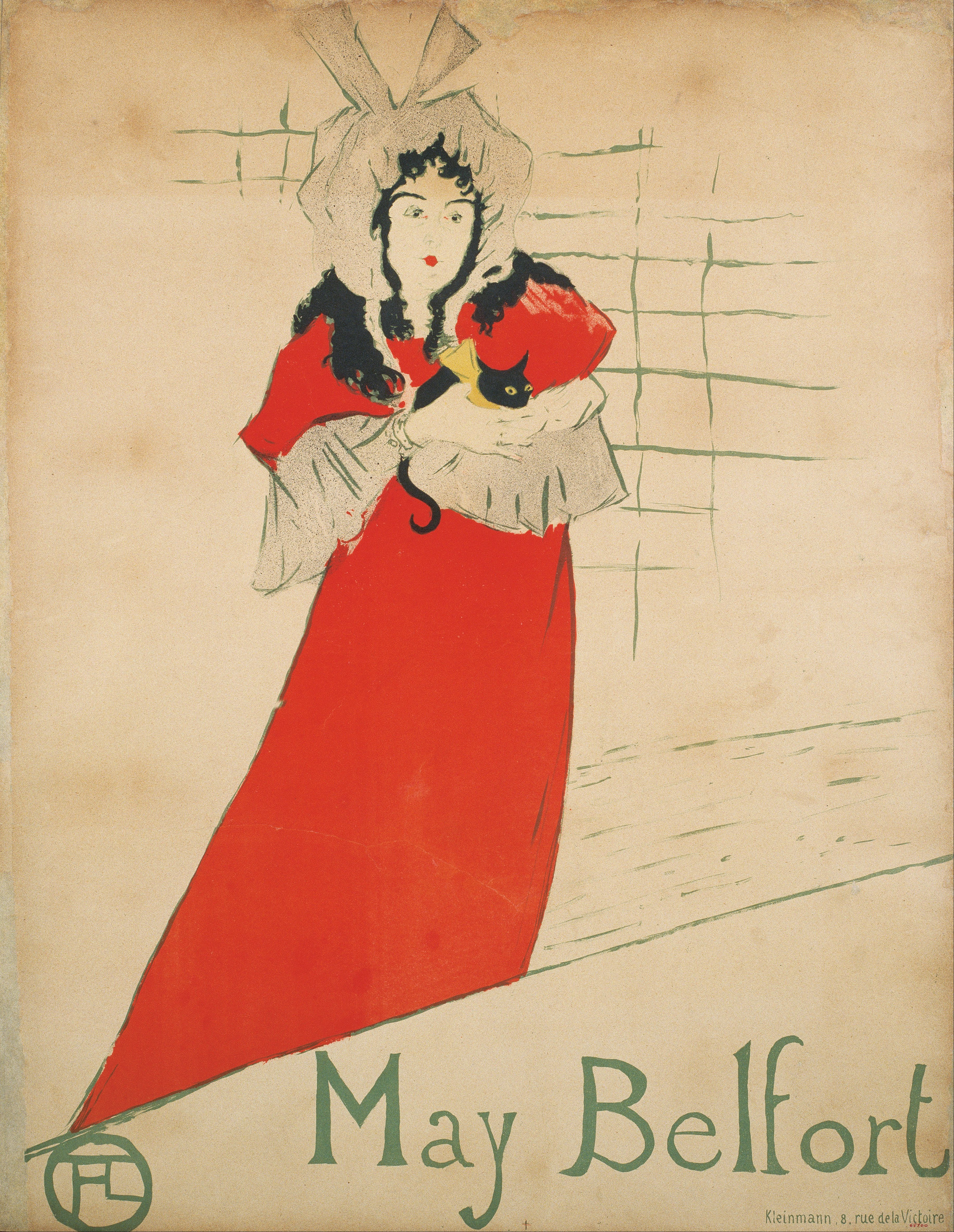
Henri de Toulouse-Lautrec: May Belfort, 1895

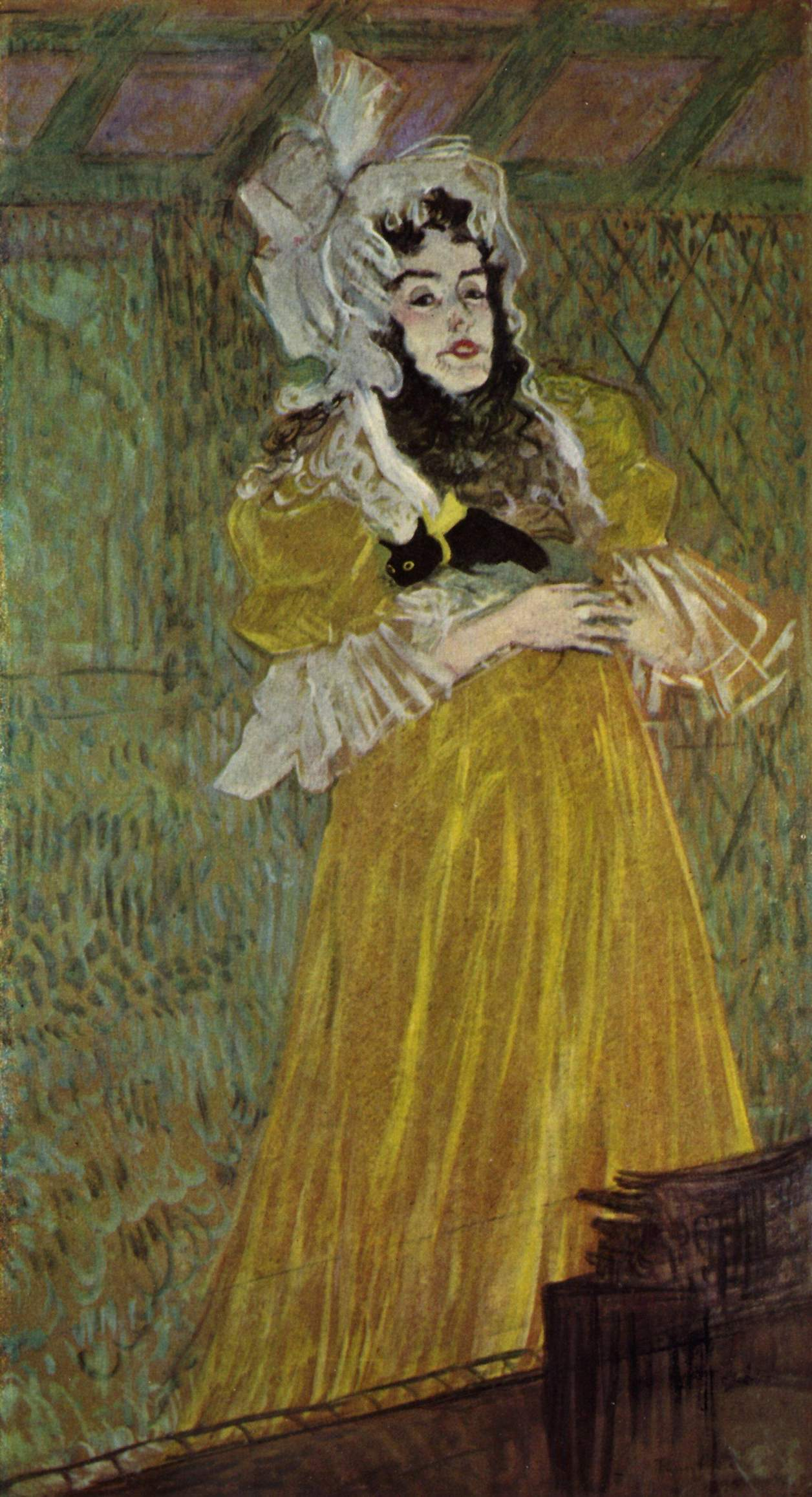

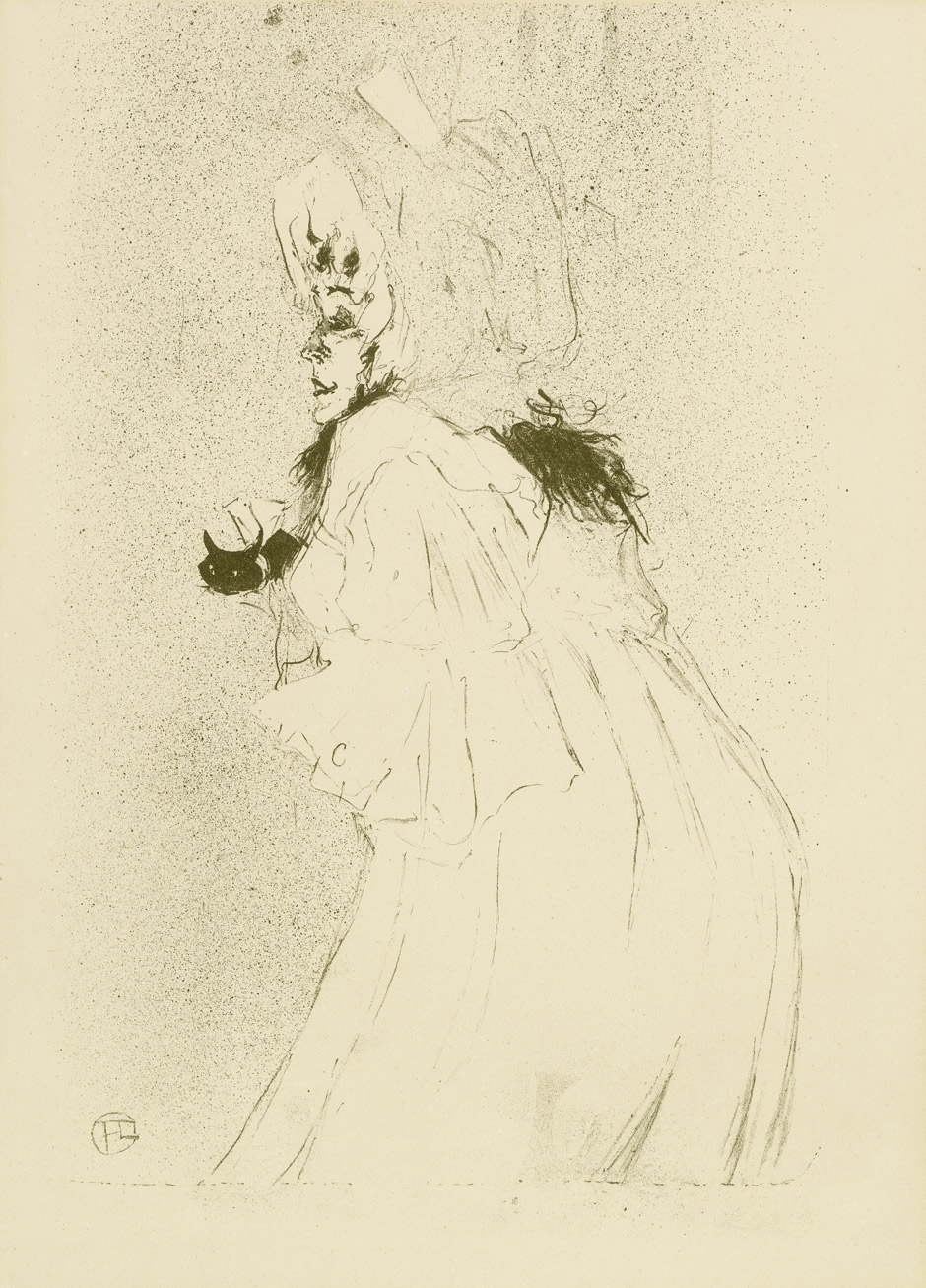

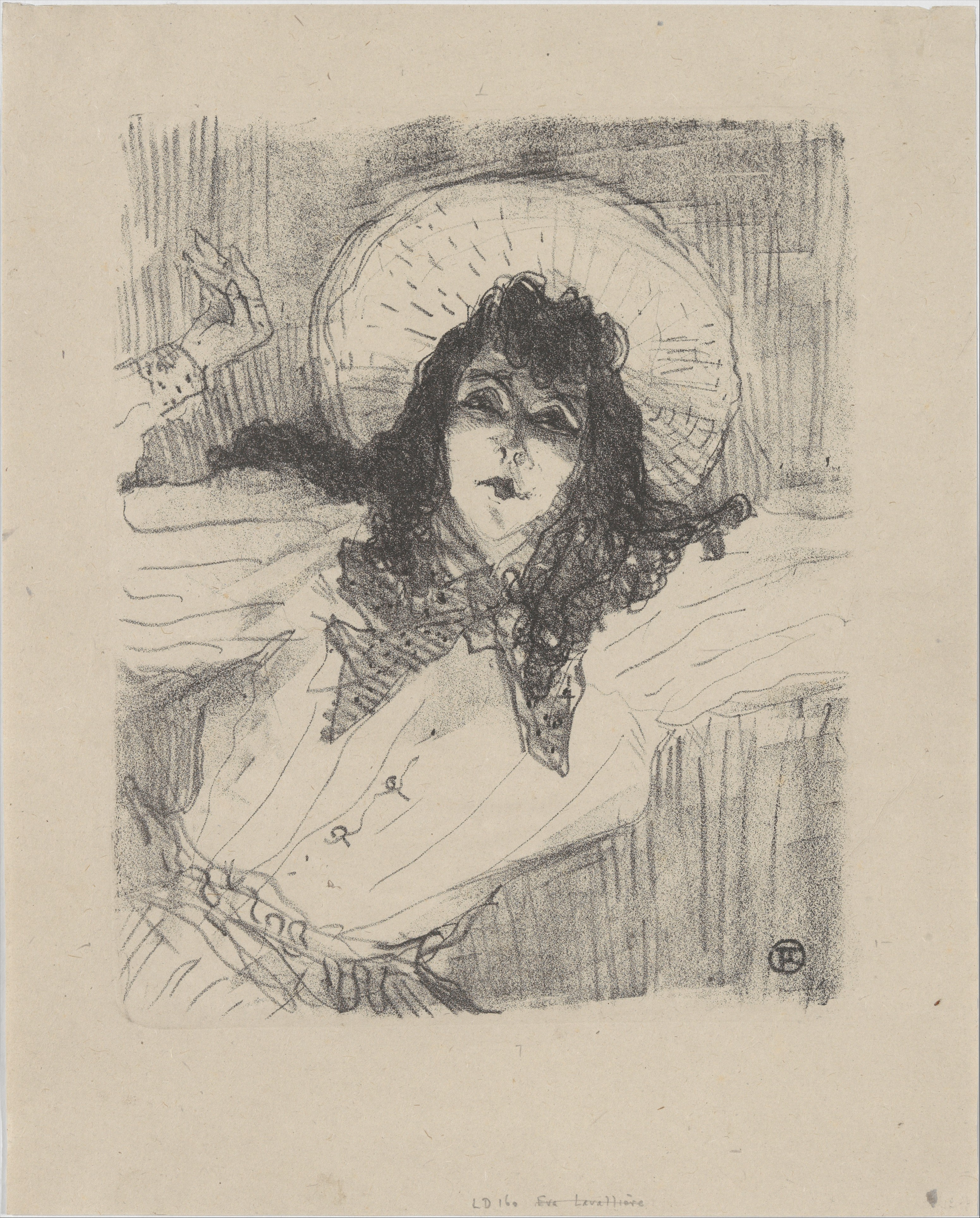

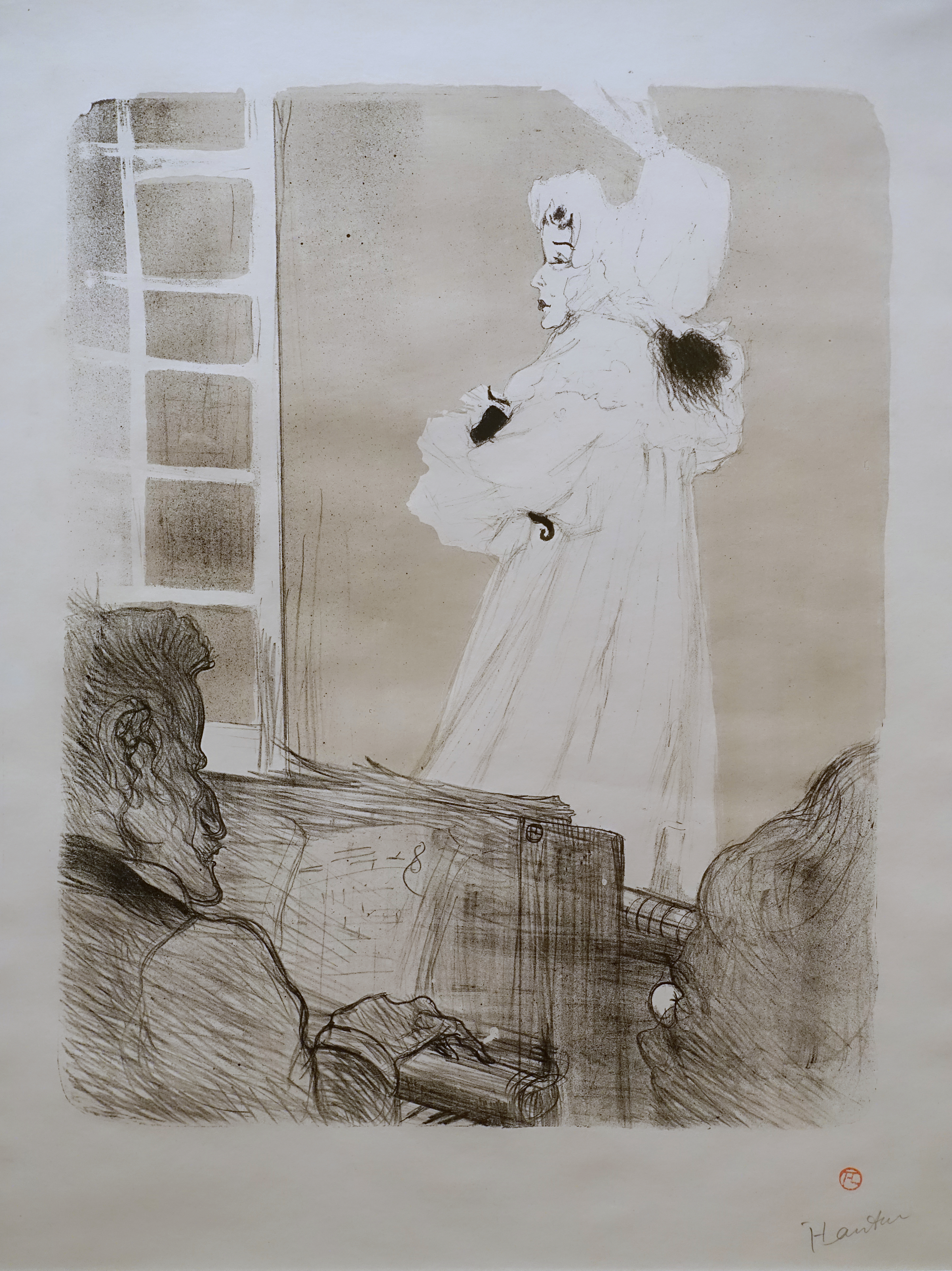

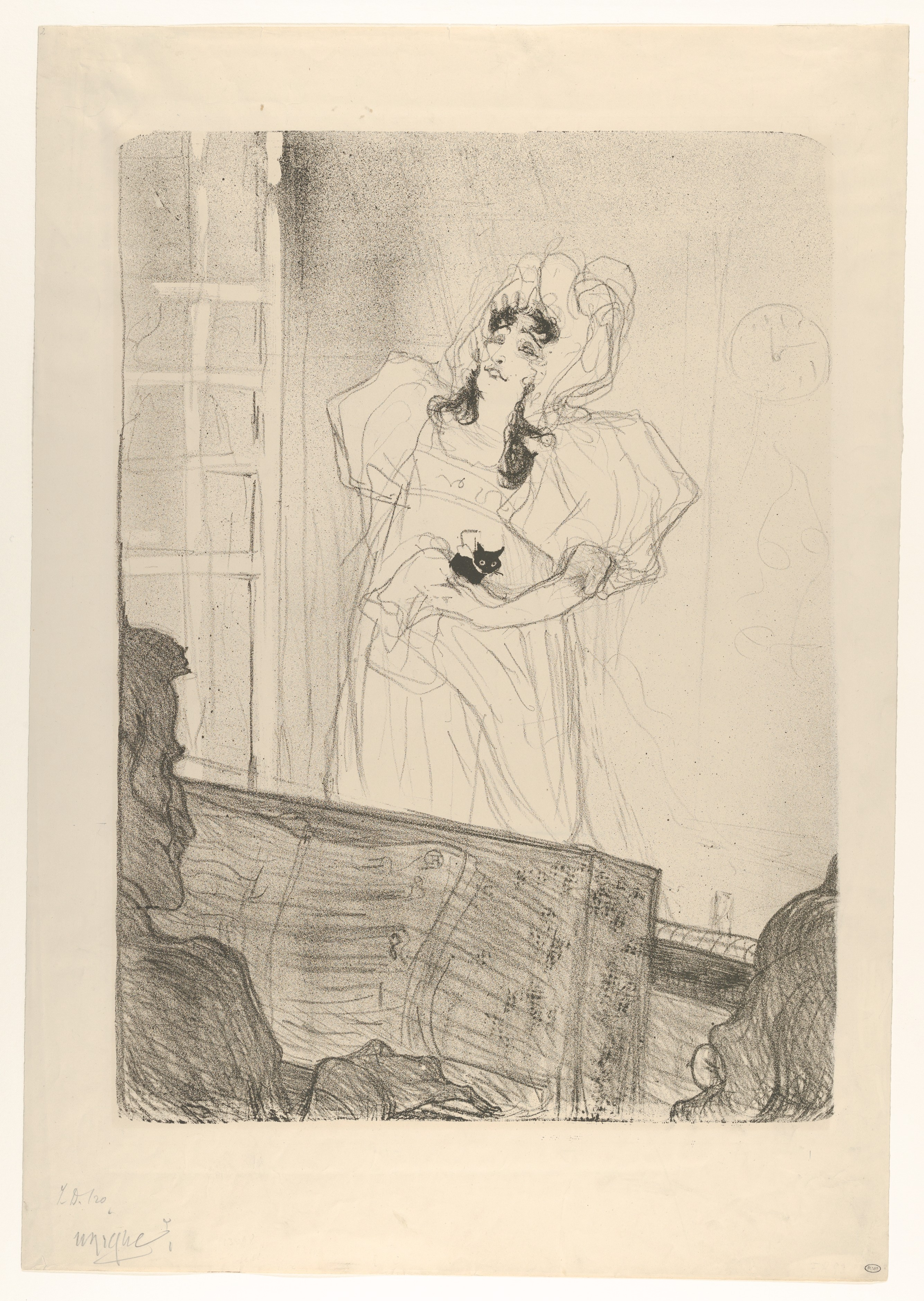

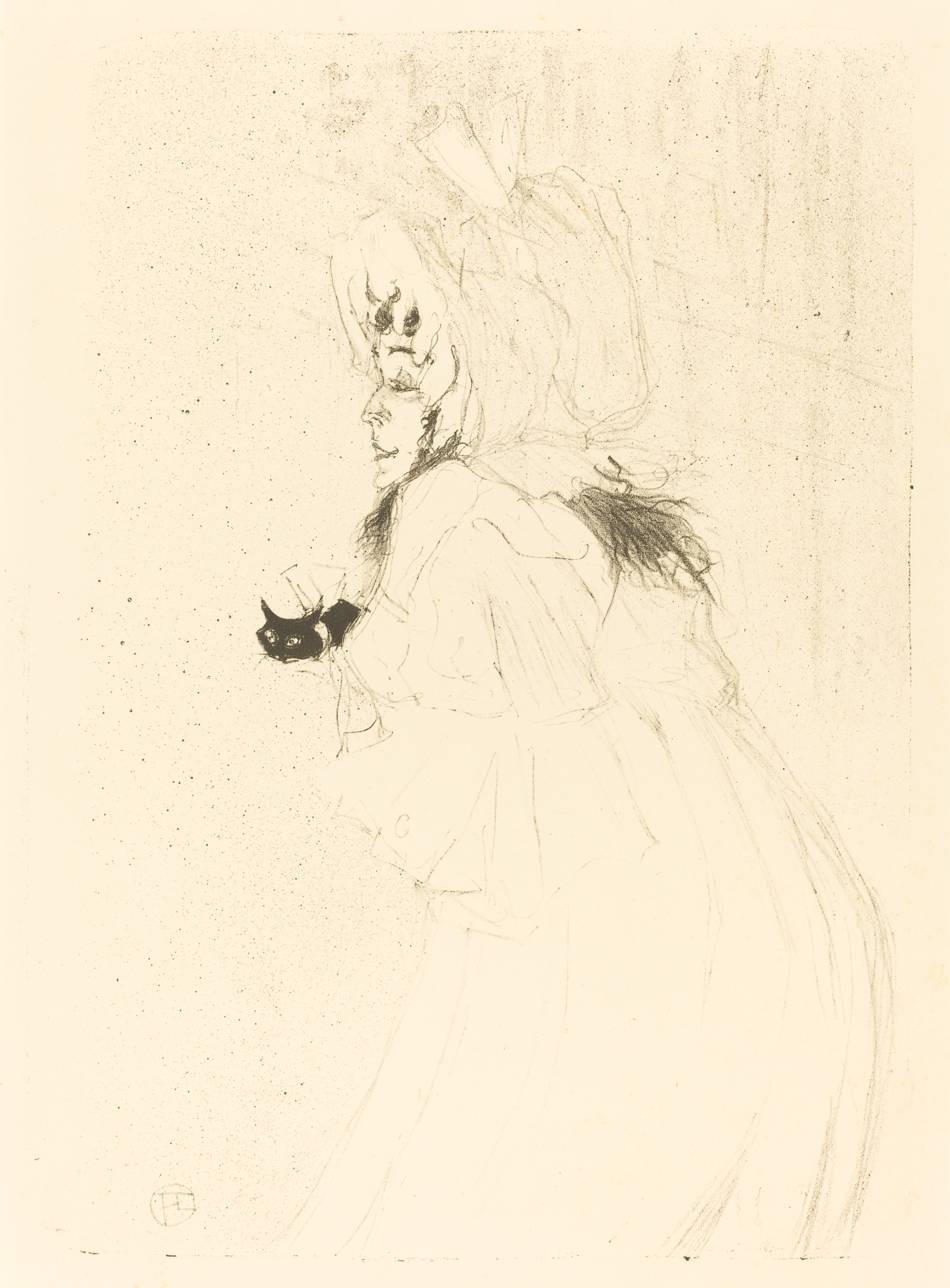

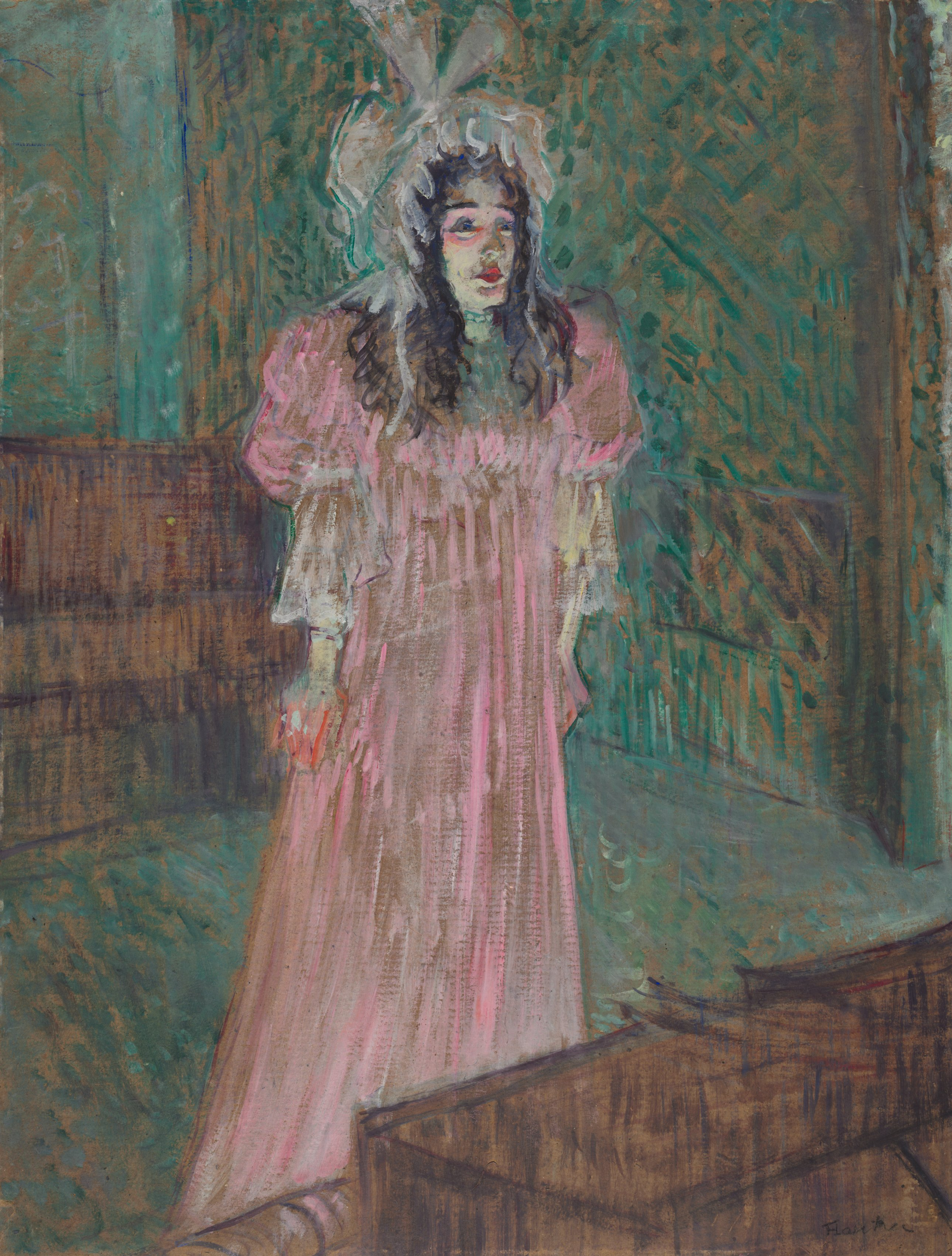
Henri de Toulouse-Lautrec, May Belfort, 1895. Oil, Framed: 86 x 71.5 x 8.9 cm (33 7/8 x 28 1/8 x 3 1/2 in.); Unframed: 63 x 48 cm (24 13/16 x 18 7/8 in.). Cleveland Museum of Art, Bequest of Leonard C. Hanna, Jr. 1958.54
