= At the Moulin Rouge =

Painting by Henri de Toulouse-Lautrec

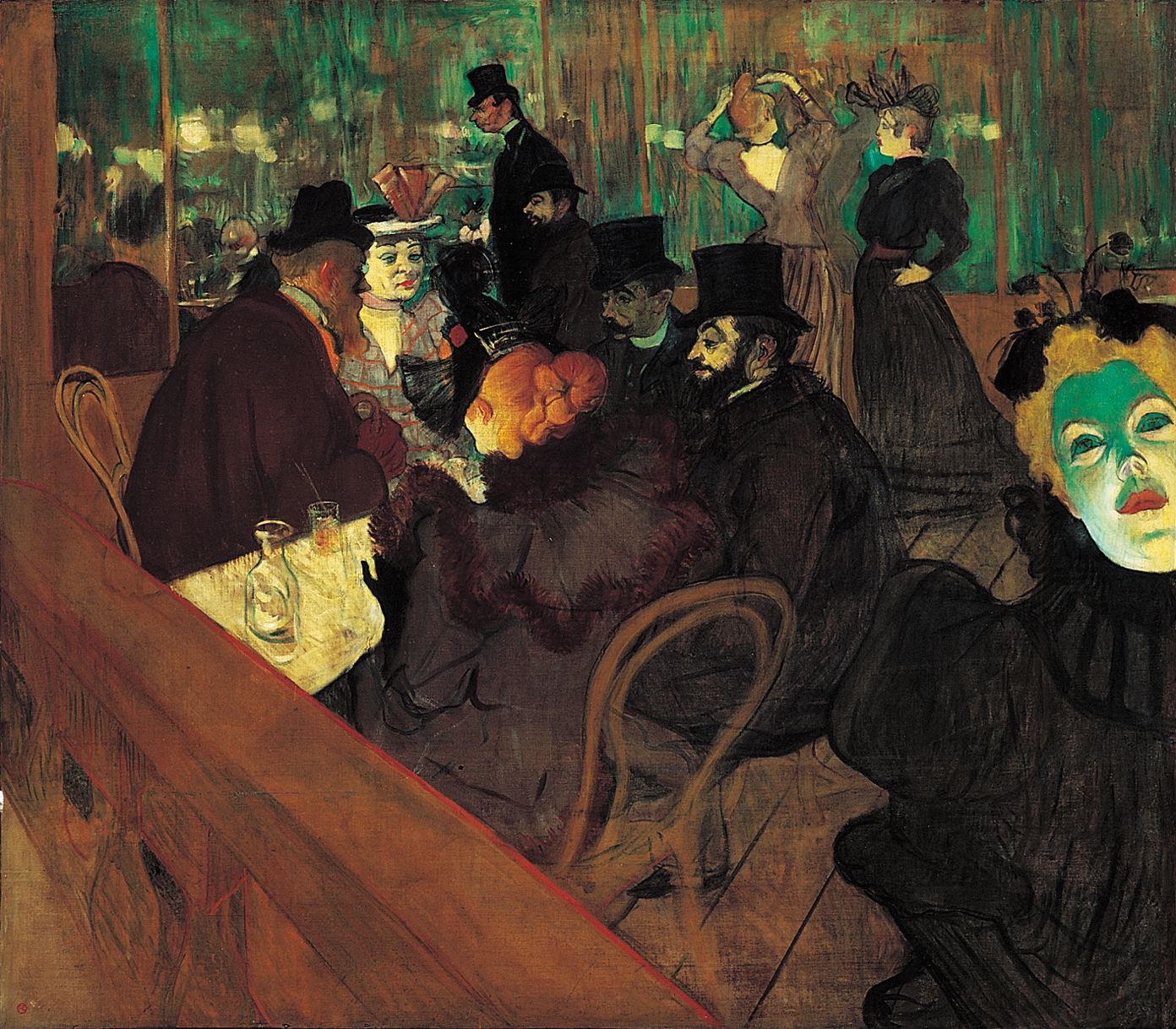
- Artist: Henri de Toulouse-Lautrec
- Year: 1892–1895
- Medium: Oil on canvas
- Movement: Post Impressionism
- Dimensions: 123 cm × 140 cm (48 in × 55 in)
- Location: Art Institute of Chicago

At the Moulin Rouge (French: Au Moulin Rouge) is an oil-on-canvas painting by French artist Henri de Toulouse-Lautrec. It was painted between 1892 and 1895. Included in the background is a self-portrait of the artist in profile. It is one of a number of works by Toulouse-Lautrec depicting the Moulin Rouge cabaret built in Paris in 1889.

The painting portrays near its center a group of three men and two women sitting around a table situated on the floor of the cabaret. From left to right, the people at the table include: writer Édouard Dujardin, dancer La Macarona, photographer Paul Secau, photographer Maurice Guibert, and, facing away, Jane Avril, being the focal point of the group - recognizable by her flaming red-orange hair. In the right foreground, apparently sitting at a different table, is a partial facial view of English dancer May Milton, with painted red lips, her face aglow in a distinctive greenish light and shadow. In the background standing on the right fixing her hair is Moulin Rouge dancer La Goulue and another woman. The center-left background shows Toulouse-Lautrec himself standing in front of Dr. Gabriel Tapié de Céleyran.

Henri de Toulouse-Lautrec was closely connected to Parisian nightlife, frequently visiting venues such as the Moulin Rouge and forming friendships with its performers. These experiences informed works like At the Moulin Rouge, reflecting aspects of Belle Époque Paris and its social and cultural atmosphere.

At the Moulin Rouge is part of the Helen Birch Bartlett Memorial Collection at the Art Institute of Chicago, where it was first displayed on December 23, 1930. It was exhibited in London in 2011 at the Courtauld Institute of Art. Art critic Jonathan Jones calls the painting a masterpiece, and writes "the scene is somehow more exotic and more exciting than any recreation [of the Moulin Rouge, or Montmartre] in popular culture."
