= Desmarest =

Desmarest is a French surname. Notable people with the surname include:

- Anselme Gaëtan Desmarest (1784–1838), French zoologist
- Eugène Anselme Sébastien Léon Desmarest (1816–1889), French zoologist and entomologist
- Henri Desmarest (or Desmarets) (1661–1741), French Baroque composer
- Marie-Anne Desmarest (1904–1973), French writer
- Nicolas Desmarest (1725–1815), French geologist
- Thierry Desmarest (1945-2024), French businessman
