= Le Piccadilly =

1904 composition by Erik Satie

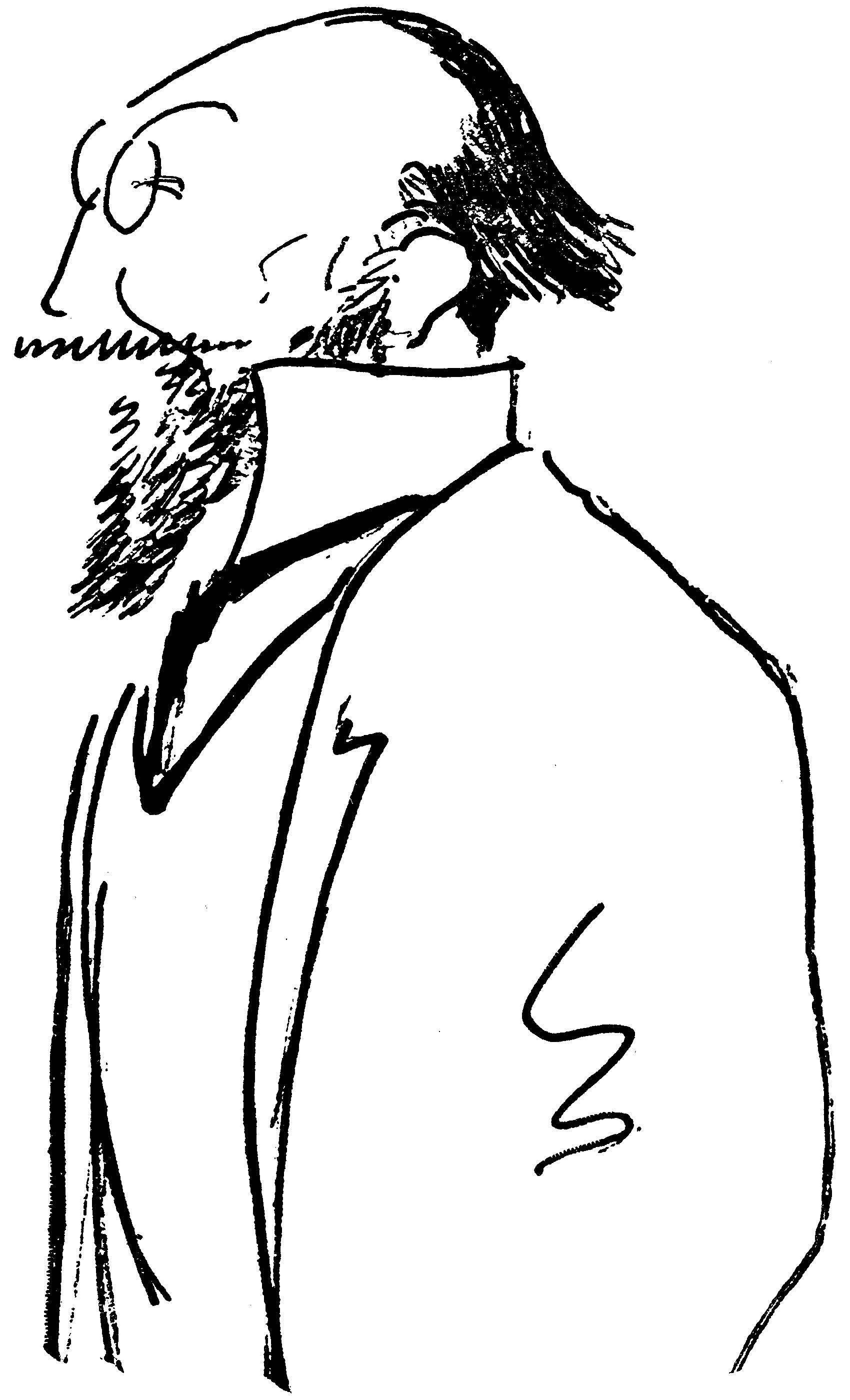
Erik Satie, caricature by Alfred Frueh

Le Piccadilly is a 1904 composition for piano or string orchestra by Erik Satie. Written as a light cabaret or café-concert tune, it was one of Satie's early experiments with ragtime influences. A performance lasts under 2 minutes.

== Description ==
Satie was arguably the first French composer to make use of budding American jazz. In April of 1900 he wrote a cakewalk for piano, the Petit prélude de 'La Mort de Monsieur Mouche', a few months after entertainer Eugénie Fougère introduced the dance to Paris. The piece went unpublished but he remained intrigued by the genre. By the peak of the Parisian cakewalk craze in 1904, Satie was working as a cabaret accompanist-songwriter and was better prepared to make use of it. After scoring a hit with the music hall song La Diva de l'Empire he started Le Piccadilly, a purely instrumental number in the same style.

It is a Joplinesque ragtime march in standard ternary form, with the addition of a four-bar introduction and four-bar vamps preceding each sixteen-bar strain. The key is F major, with a middle-section trio in the subdominant of B flat major. Musicologists believe Satie modeled his main theme on the "phone call chorus" of Howard and Emerson's Tin Pan Alley tune Hello! Ma Baby (1899); Fougère had used this song to demonstrate the cakewalk onstage. The composer's sketches reveal alternate versions of the introduction and that he planned to add a coda.

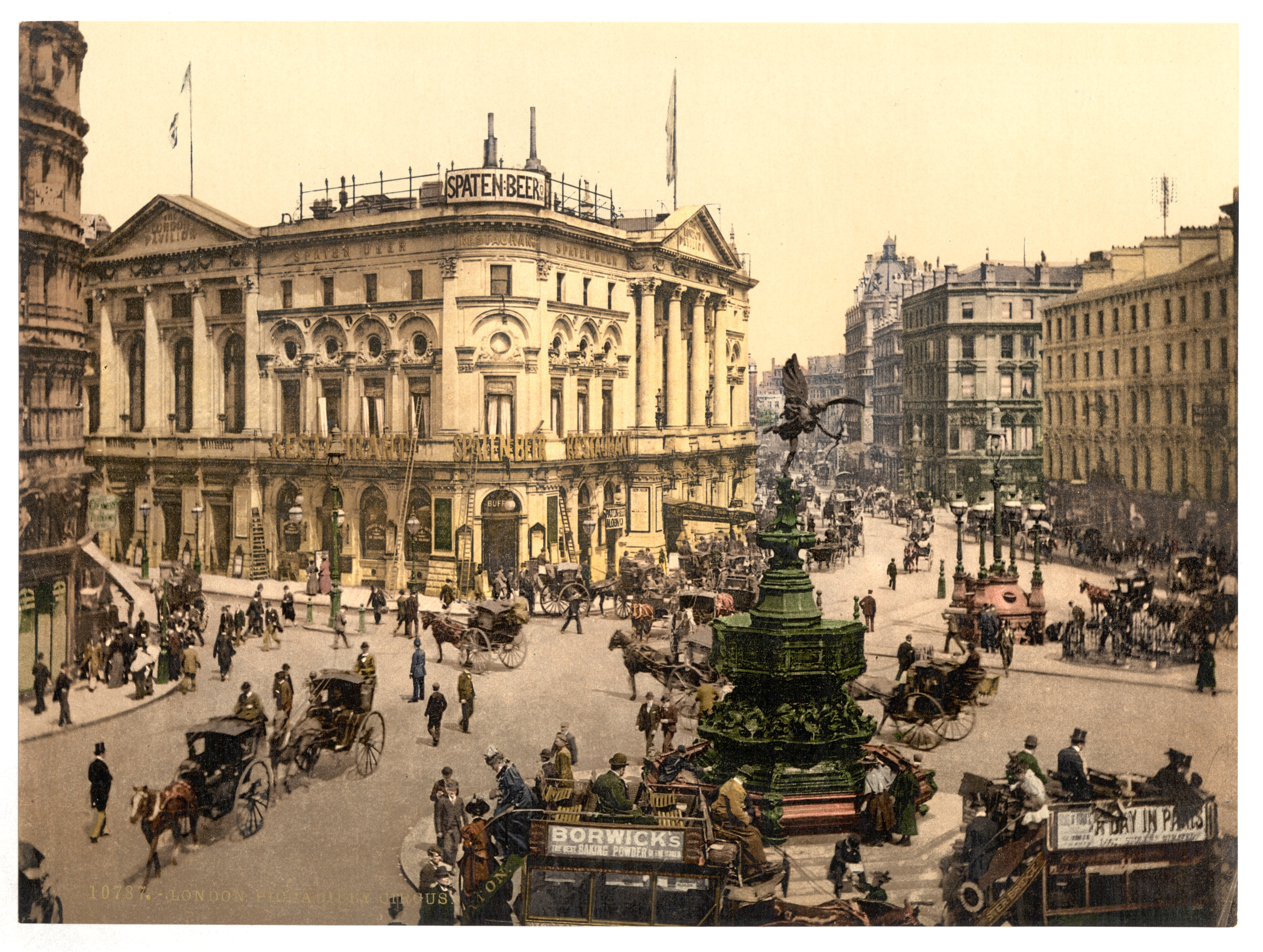
Piccadilly Circus, London, c. 1900

According to the manuscripts the piece was originally called La Transatlantique, an ironic term for wealthy American heiresses who sailed to France looking to buy social status through marriage to impoverished French aristocrats. One such woman, Princesse Edmond de Polignac (née Winnaretta Singer of the sewing machine family), would later become an important patron of Satie's, so perhaps it was for the best that he changed the title. The new one was probably suggested by La Diva de l'Empire, with its lyrical references to Piccadilly Circus in London.

Satie registered Le Piccadilly with SACEM on October 19, 1904, and subsequently arranged it for string orchestra. Both scores were published by Alexis Rouart in 1907; today these are among the rarest of Satie first editions. Despite its appearance in print this cabaret instrumental slipped into total obscurity compared to Satie's other piano works. His first biographers, Pierre-Daniel Templier (1932) and Rollo H. Myers (1948), seemed unaware of its existence. A resurgence in Satie's posthumous fame during the late 1960s and early 1970s coincided with the popular Scott Joplin revival, prompting renewed interest in his ragtime excursions. A new edition of Le Piccadilly was published by Salabert in 1975, and it has since become one of his more popular and frequently recorded works.

== Recordings ==
For piano:

Aldo Ciccolini (EMI, 1987), France Clidat (Forlane, 1980), Philippe Entremont (CBS, 1981), Jean-Pierre Armengaud (Le Chant du Monde, 1986), Roland Pöntinen (BIS, 1986), Anne Queffélec (Virgin Classics, 1988), Pascal Rogé (Decca, 1989), Yitkin Seow (Hyperion, 1989), Peter Lawson (EMI, 1989), Gabriel Tacchino (Disques Pierre Verany, 1993), Klára Körmendi (Naxos Records, 1994), Bojan Gorišek (Audiophile Classics, 1994), Olof Höjer (Swedish Society Discofil, 1996), Peter Dickinson (Olympia, 2001), Jean-Yves Thibaudet (Decca, 2003), Håkon Austbø (Brilliant Classics, 2006), Francine Kay (Analekta, 2006), Cristina Ariagno (Brilliant Classics, 2007), Jan Kaspersen (Scandinavian Classics, 2007), Marco Rapetti (Dynamic, 2007), Alexandre Tharaud (Harmonia Mundi, 2009), Jeroen van Veen (Brilliant Classics, 2016), Noriko Ogawa (BIS, 2016), Nicolas Horvath (Grand Piano, 2019), Steffen Schleiermacher (MDG, 2021).

For orchestra:

Michel Plasson, Orchestre du Capitole de Toulouse (Erato, 1988).
