= May Milton =

British cabaret dancer in 19th-century Paris

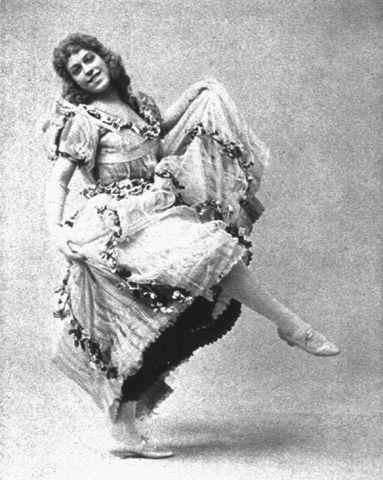
Photograph of May Milton (undated)

May Milton was a British cabaret dancer and performer active in late 19th‑century Paris, France, a high-profile figure (albeit for a brief period) in the Belle Époque entertainment world. Artist Henri de Toulouse‑Lautrec depicted her in several images, including the striking lithograph poster May Milton (1895), originally intended to advertise her planned tour of the United States.

== Life and career ==
Details of her birth and death remain unknown. She rose to prominence for her season-long engagement at the Moulin Rouge cabaret in Paris, having arrived in 1895 with an English dance troupe. Critics such as Maurice Joyant described her face as “deathly pale, almost clownlike … reminiscent of that of a bulldog”, but praised her “agility” and “purely English choreographic skill” which "were at that time revolutionary".

Lithograph advertising May Milton's planned tour of the United States in 1895, by Henri de Toulouse-Lautrec.

Milton was mentored by fellow performer Jane Avril, with whom she shared a brief romantic relationship. Avril played a significant role in Milton’s career while in Paris. She also had a romantic relationship with May Belfort, another dancer depicted by Toulouse-Lautrec.

== Depictions ==
In 1895, Avril asked Toulouse-Lautrec to design a poster for May Milton before the latter embarked on an American tour, which never materialized. This poster was designed to be displayed alongside another he made for May Belfort, possibly as a complementary portrait. It also appears hung on the wall in the background of Pablo Picasso's 1901 painting The Blue Room.

May Milton appeared in several of Henri de Toulouse‑Lautrec's other works, notably At the Moulin Rouge, in the right foreground, and in an oil and pastel portrait, both now in the collection of the Art Institute of Chicago.
