= Maurice Guibert =

French photographer (1856–1922)

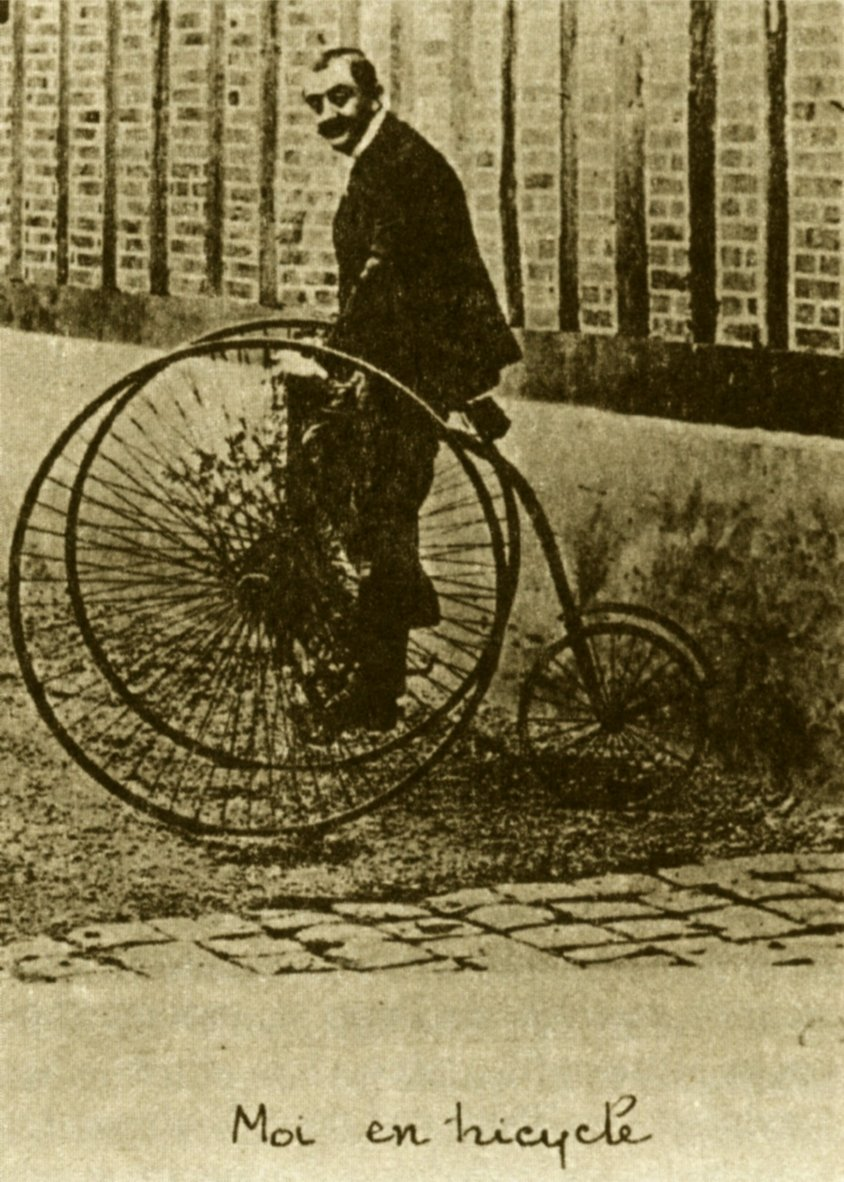
- Born: 12 August 1856
- Died: 13 January 1922 (aged 65)

Maurice Guibert (12 August 1856 – 13 January 1922) was a French photographer best known today as a friend of Henri de Toulouse-Lautrec.

He was an agent for the champagne company Moët and Chandon and a member of the Société française de photographie. Little else is known of him other than his self-portraits and photos of Toulouse-Lautrec that often led to collaborations such as in the painting À La Mie:

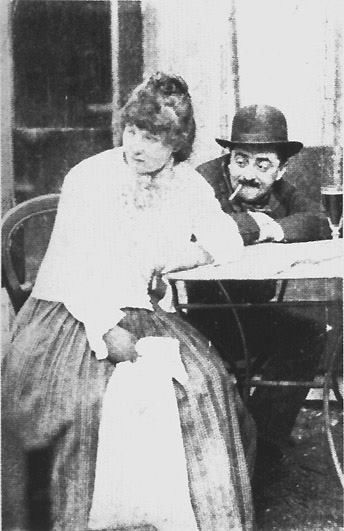

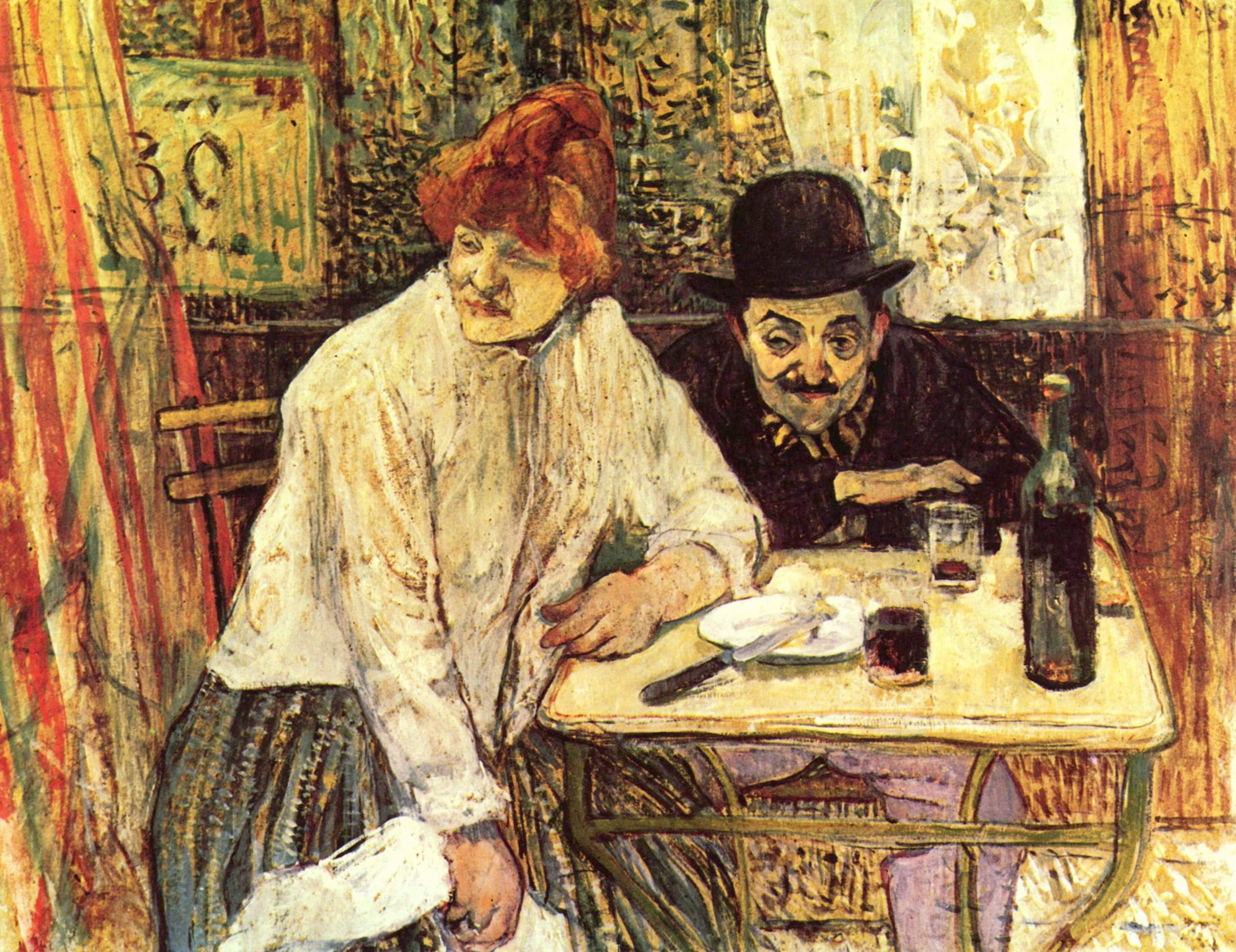

Guibert is portrayed in the Toulouse-Lautrec painting At the Moulin Rouge.
