= Jose Shercliff =

British journalist and author who worked in Paris and Lisbon

- Born: Josephine Alfreda Lilley Shercliff; November 2, 1902; Burton upon Trent, England
- Died: January 21, 1985 (aged 82); Cascais, Portugal
- Occupations: Journalist; author

Jose Shercliff (1902–1985) was a British journalist who worked in Paris and Lisbon as a foreign correspondent for several newspapers and magazines.

== Early life ==
Josephine Alfreda Lilley Shercliff was born on 2 November 1902 in Burton upon Trent, England, the daughter of a brewer. The family home, which was leased from the British fascist Sir Oswald Mosley who lived nearby, was at Rolleston on Dove near Burton. Shercliff went to boarding school in Lincoln. She then was accepted by the University of Oxford, at a time when it was extremely unusual for women to go to university, obtaining a BA degree in English literature in 1924. At the university, she was a member of the Society of Oxford Home Students, which offered lodging in houses in Oxford rather than in halls of residence. This later became St Anne's College.

== Paris ==
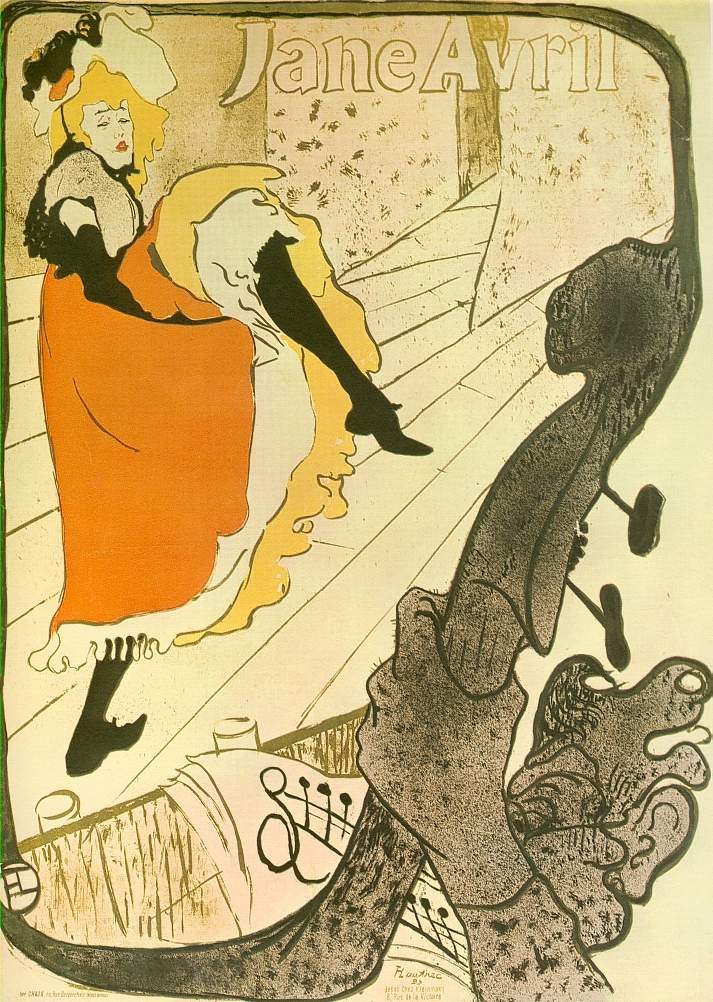
Jane Avril, poster, 1893, by Toulouse-Lautrec

After graduating, she obtained a job in London with the Daily Express, initially as a secretary but then taking on journalism work, writing about fashion. In the early 1930s she left the United Kingdom, and rarely returned for any length of time. She first lived in Paris, working as a secretary at the American Library, where she met many of the American writers who lived in that city at that time. She continued her career in journalism in France as an assistant to the correspondent of the Daily Herald. One of her jobs was to locate former Moulin Rouge can-can dancer, Jane Avril, who had been the muse of the painter Henri de Toulouse-Lautrec, which she successfully did. Their long discussions led to Shercliff publishing a book about Avril in 1952, using illustrations from Lautrec's work.

== Barcelona ==
Shercliff, who also worked for the News Chronicle, was then sent to Barcelona in 1936 to cover the People's Olympiad, which was planned as a protest against the 1936 Summer Olympics being held in Nazi Germany. However, the People's Olympiad did not take place because the Spanish Civil War broke out. Shercliff now inadvertently became a war correspondent, sending vivid accounts of the fighting back to the Daily Herald, smuggling her copy out of Spain with the help of willing travellers. Staying in Barcelona for three weeks, she was briefly arrested on suspicion of being a spy.

== Lisbon ==
When Paris fell to the German invasion in 1940, she managed to get out of the city, writing reports about her hasty retreat for the Daily Herald. After four months in London, she left again, having agreed to become a correspondent in New York City. As it was not possible to go directly from England to the USA, she was routed through the Portuguese capital of Lisbon. Arriving in Portugal, she found it difficult to get a passage to New York because the city was full of refugees also seeking to go to America. Attracted by Lisbon, she decided to go no further, believing that the city would offer interesting opportunities for a journalist. During the war, she carefully watched the spying activities by both the Allies and the Axis powers in both Lisbon and the Estoril area, where she lived. She passed encoded messages to the British Special Operations Executive through the media.

Shercliff supported large numbers of refugees of all nationalities arriving in Lisbon. At a time when female journalists were rare, she quickly became known among the other foreign correspondents in Portugal for her accuracy, persistence, and courage. She worked part-time for the Associated Press from 1947 to 1964 and, from 1960, for The Times. She collaborated with the international service of the BBC and wrote articles for a range of magazines and journals, including Foreign Affairs. Rapidly becoming a popular member of the British community, she published many articles in the English-language Anglo-Portuguese News and was very friendly with the owners, Luís Marques and Susan Lowndes Marques.

Shercliff adopted a critical view of the authoritarian Estado Novo regime and was often visited by the PIDE, the secret police. It is likely that others, similarly critical, would have been deported, but Portugal feared repercussions from its British allies if they removed her from the country. After the Carnation Revolution and the overthrow of the Estado Novo in 1974, which she covered widely, she became friendly with many leading Portuguese. Shortly before her death in Cascais hospital, she was visited by the prime minister, Mario Soares and by the artist Paula Rego.

Jose Shercliff retired from journalism in 1981 and died on 21 January 1985. She was unmarried.

== Publications ==
Shercliff published one book and one translation.

- 1952. Jane Avril of the Moulin Rouge. Jarrolds Publishers. It was also published in German and Dutch.
- 1960. Nita Lupi. Music and Spirit of Portuguese India. (translated by Jose Shercliff). Edicao Comemorativa Do V Centenario Da Morte Do Infante D. Henrique (Commemorative Edition on 500th Anniversary of the Death of Prince Henry). Also available in Portuguese.
