= Jean Berveiller =

French composer and organist

Jean Marie Berveiller (June 29, 1904 – October 21, 1976) was a French composer and organist.

Jean Berveiller was born in 1904 in Sommedieue. He began to play the piano, mainly Jazz, and through his friends Clément Doucet and Jean Wiener eventually lead the popular Parisian cabaret Le Boeuf sur le Toit. Although he followed a career in the financial business, he spent all of his free time in music. Berveiller was a talented organist and studied composition and harmony with Marcel Dupré for seven years. Among his compositions are several jazz-inspired organ compositions, which the French organist Jeanne Demessieux frequently performed in her organ concerts. Demessieux dedicated her organ cycle, Sept Méditations sur le Saint-Esprit, opus 6, to Berveiller. Jean Berveiller died in 1976 in Paris.

== Compositions ==
=== Organ solo ===
- Suite (Paris: Durand, 1950)
  - Allegro (composed 1948)
  - Intermezzo (composed 1945)
  - Adagio
  - Final
- Épitaphe (composed 1949. Paris: Durand, 1953)
- Cadence: Étude de concert (composed 1946. Paris: Durand, 1953)
- Mouvement (composed 1957. Amersfoort: Musiscript, 2003)

=== Other works ===
- Piano concerto (unfinished)
- César Franck: Rédemption - Interlude Symphonique, arranged for organ (Manuscript)

== Bibliography ==
- "Jean Berveiller", in: John Henderson (ed.): A directory of composers for organ (2d ed.). Swindon: John Henderson, 1996.
- Biography "Jean Berveiller", in: Mouvement pour orgue. Amersfoort: Musiscript, 2003.

== Recordings ==
- Guide de la Musique d'Orgue Recordings of works by Jean Berveiller.
