= La Diva de l'Empire =

1904 song by Erik Satie

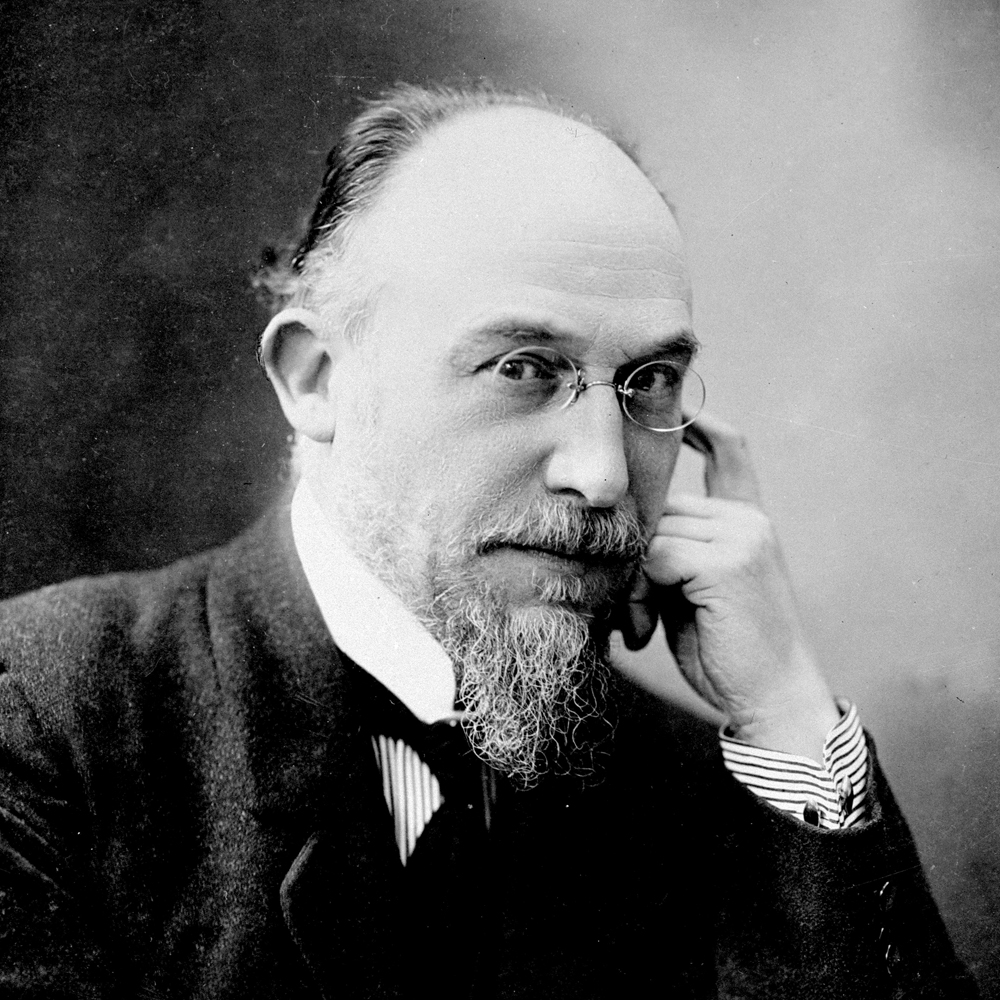
Erik Satie

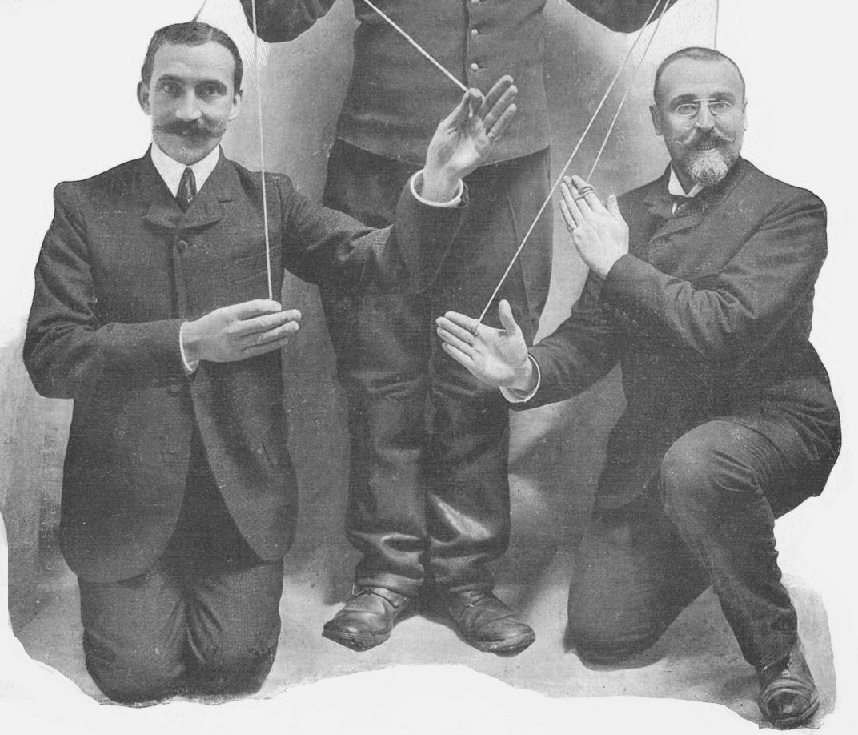
Entertainers Numa Blès (1871–1917) and Dominique Bonnaud (1864–1943), lyricists of "La Diva de l'Empire"

"La Diva de l'Empire" (The Diva of the Empire) is a French popular song with music by Erik Satie and lyrics by Dominique Bonnaud and Numa Blès, composed in 1904. Along with "Je te veux" (1903) it is probably the best-known example of Satie's cabaret or "café-concert" idiom. It was premiered by singer Paulette Darty, dubbed the "Queen of the Slow Waltz", in the musical revue Dévidons la bobine in Paris on July 26, 1904, and published that same year.

== Description ==
The song is a cakewalk and an early attempt by a European composer to tackle nascent American jazz. John Philip Sousa and his band had introduced the cakewalk to France during their appearance at the 1900 Paris Exposition, but it gained little notoriety there until a danced version was performed in the revue Joyeux nègres (The Happy Negroes) at the Nouveau Cirque in October 1902. The show ran for over a year and sparked a national craze. Satie was intrigued with the new style and, as Darty's occasional accompanist and songwriter, prepared to capitalize on it. On May 20, 1904, he registered a piano piece called "Stand-Walk" with SACEM that was virtually identical with the keyboard part of "La Diva de l'Empire" except for its key. Satie, Bonnaud and Blès adapted it into a song for Darty, who was delighted with it. The refrain is in G major, with a syncopated ragtime melody strutting above an accompaniment in moderate march tempo. The two stanzas are in D major.

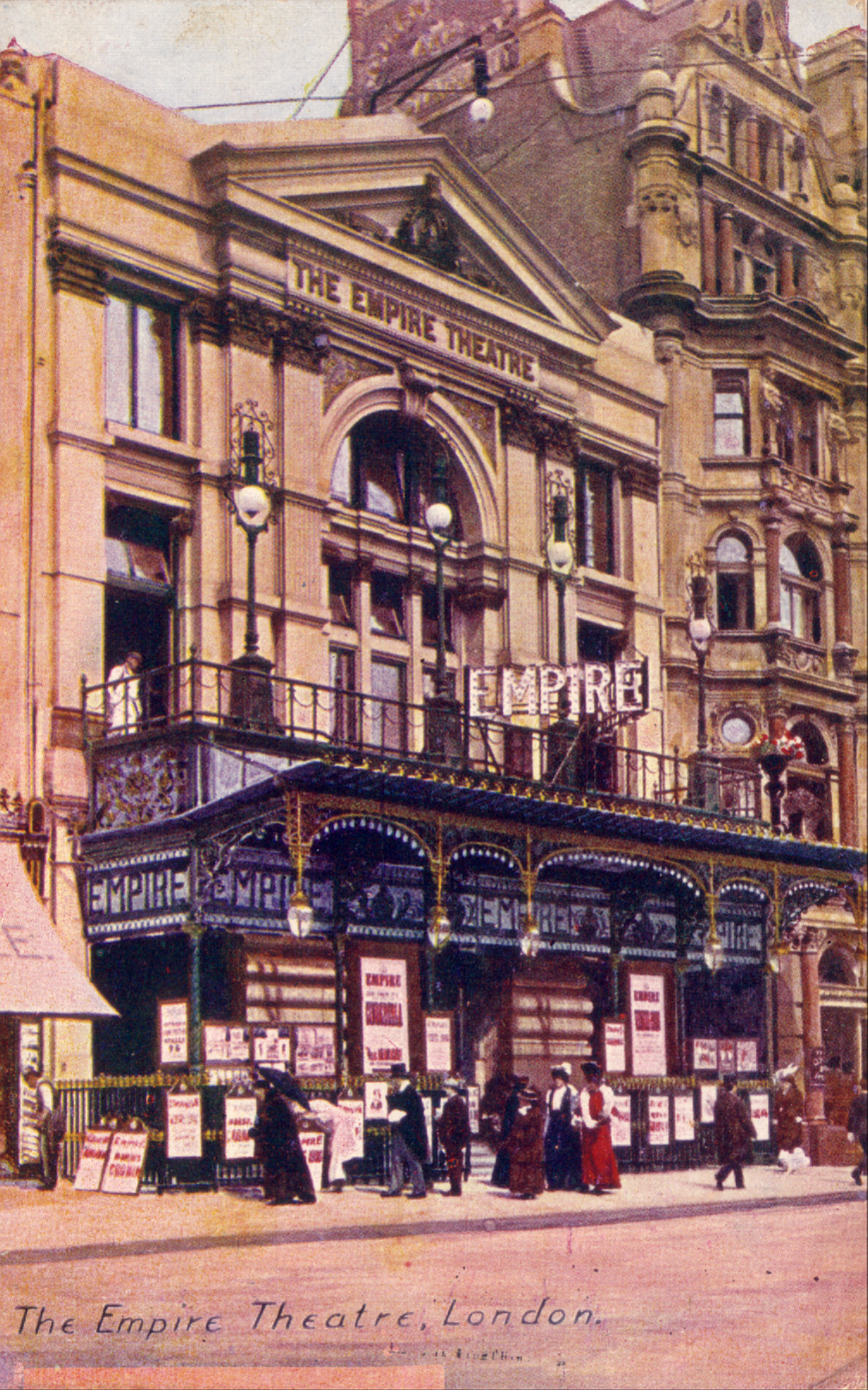
Empire Theatre in Leicester Square, London, the eponymous setting of "La Diva de l'Empire", c. 1905

The lyrics – with their references to Piccadilly and smattering of English words – identify the "Empire" of the title as the Empire Theatre, a famous music hall on Leicester Square in London. Its indoor promenades were hotbeds of vice where high-class prostitutes, nicknamed "Daughters of the Empire" by the British press, plied their trade, and were the target of a much-publicized 1894 attempt by social reformers to shut them down. For Parisian listeners in the know this provided a salacious backdrop for the otherwise mildly "naughty" text. The Diva is an unnamed star performer at the theatre, who dresses like a little girl (complete with a "big Greenaway hat") and acts like one until she coyly lifts her skirts to reveal her "quivering" legs. Her loyal following of "snobs" and "dandies" (Note: These English words are used in the lyrics.) throw bouquets of flowers onto the stage while she expresses contempt for them with mocking laughter. The verse concludes, "It is all very very innocent and very very exciting."

"La Diva de l'Empire" proved quite popular. Satie praised Darty for her interpretation: "You are so charming in that piece, one would have to have entrails of iron not to applaud you." Darty sang it on tour throughout France and held exclusive rights to the song until her retirement in 1908. It was first recorded by singer Adeline Lanthenay for Pathé in 1912 – the earliest known recording of a Satie composition. After World War I, H. Ourdine published a piano transcription with the subtitle "Intermezzo américain". Satie also provided an arrangement for brasserie orchestra.

Satie's cabaret songs of the early 1900s were products of an unhappy period in his life, when he was unsure of his musical direction and poverty compelled him to write what he called "rudes saloperies" ("crude shit") to make a living. As Rollo H. Myers pointed out, he succeeded in doing this without sacrificing his creative integrity: "The interesting thing about these early 'Montmartre' compositions is that they show that Satie, even when aping the methods and language of the circus and music-hall, somehow managed to preserve all his innate candor and purity of style – the same purity that can be perceived in such works as the Gymnopédies or the Gnossiennes". They had important repercussions, on his own subsequent development and for other French composers (notably Les Six) who would find inspiration in popular music. Satie's close friend Claude Debussy famously included a cakewalk (with a satirical Wagner quotation) in his piano suite Children's Corner (1908) and Satie himself revisited the ragtime rhythms of "Diva" in his ballets Parade (1917) and La belle excentrique (1920).

== Lyrics ==
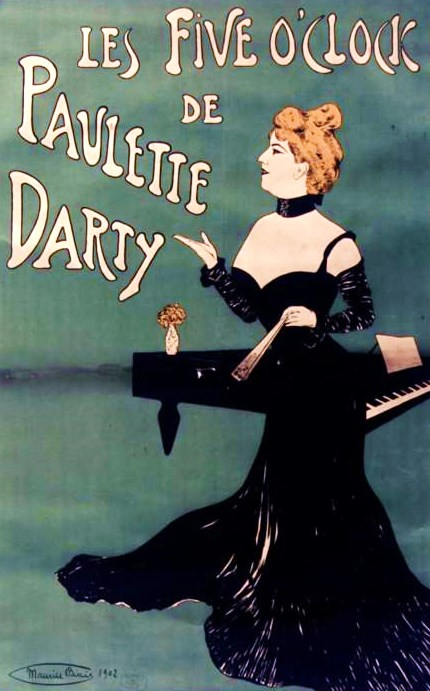
French cabaret star Paulette Darty (1870–1939) in a 1902 poster by Maurice Biais

Refrain
Sous le grand chapeau Greenaway,
Mettant l'éclat d'un sourire,
D'un rire charmant et frais
De baby étonné qui soupire,
Little girl aux yeux veloutés,
C'est la Diva de l'Empire.
C'est la reine dont s'éprennent
Les gentlemen
Et tous les dandys
De Piccadilly.

1. Dans un seul "yes" elle met tant de douceur
Que tous les snobs en gilet à cœur, (Note: Gilet à cœur is a waistcoat with a low opening)
L'accueillant de hourras frénétiques,
Sur la scène lancent des gerbes de fleurs,
Sans remarquer le rire narquois
De son joli minois.

Refrain

2. Elle danse presque automatiquement
Et soulève, aoh! très pioudiquement, (Note: pioudiquement is deliberate misspelling of pudiquement, as if pronounced by an English speaker)
Ses jolis dessous de fanfreluches,
De ses jambes montrant le frétillement.
C'est à la fois très très innocent
Et très très excitant.

Refrain

Refrain
Beneath the large Greenaway hat,
Putting on her brilliant smile,
The fresh and charming laugh
Of a wide-eyed sighing babe,
Little girl with velvet eyes,
That's the Diva of the Empire,
That's the queen they're smitten with,
The gentlemen
And all the dandies
Of Piccadilly.

1. Into a single "Yes" she puts such sweetness,
That all the snobs in waistcoats
Welcome her with frenzied hurrahs,
Toss bunches of flowers on the stage,
Without observing the sly smile
On her pretty face.

Refrain

2. She dances almost mechanically
And lifts, Oh! so modestly,
Her pretty frilly underwear,
Showing her wriggling legs,
At the same time it's is very, very innocent
And very, very exciting.

Refrain

== Notes and references ==
Notes

Sources

- Myers, Rollo H. (1968) [1948 by Denis Dobson, London]. Erik Satie (2nd illustrated ed.). New York: Dover Publications. ISBN 9780486219035.
- Whiting, Steven Moore (1999). Satie the Bohemian: From Cabaret to Concert Hall. Oxford Monographs on Music. Clarendon Press. ISBN 9780191584527.
