= Maurice Biais =

French painter

Maurice Amédée Louis Biais
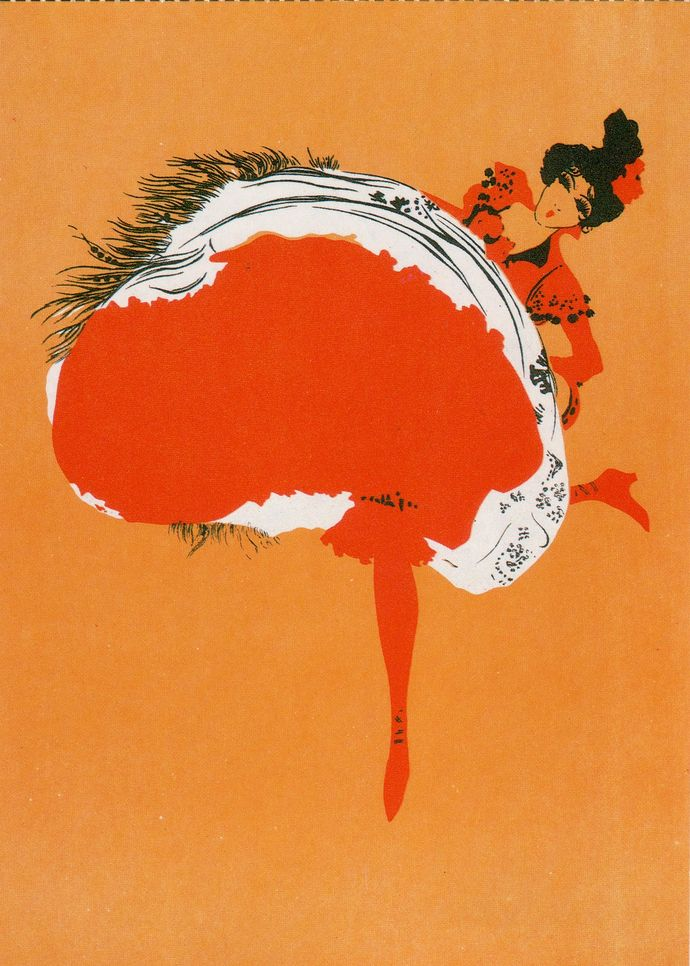
- Born: Maurice Amédée Louis Biais; 30 December 1872; Corbeil, France
- Died: 8 April 1926 (aged 53)
- Resting place: Père Lachaise Cemetery
- Known for: painting, draughting, illustration
- Movement: Art Nouveau
- Spouse: Jane Avril (1911–1926) (his death)

Maurice Amédée Louis Biais (shortened as Maurice Biais) (30 December 1872 – 8 April 1926) was a French painter, draughtsman and illustrator.

== Biography ==
From 1899, he designs furniture for La Maison Moderne, an art gallery founded by Julius Meier-Graefe. He designed leather goods for the shop, as well.

He married Jane Avril in 1911. They lived in Jouy-en-Josas until his death in 1926, which has been attributed to his having been gassed during World War I.

== Works ==
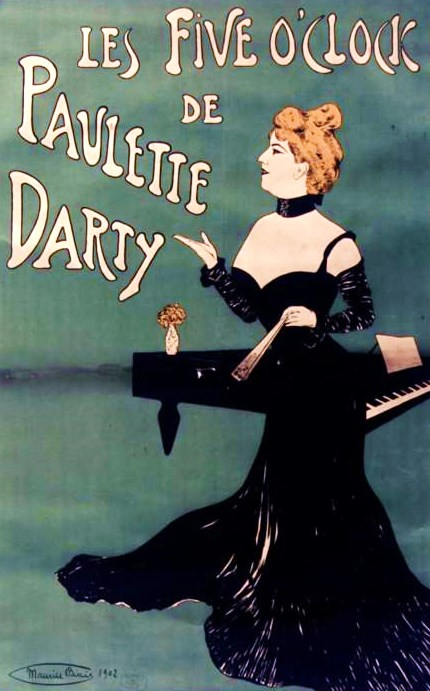
French cabaret star Paulette Darty (1870–1939) in a 1902 poster by Maurice Biais

- Modern Style (1902)
- Les Five o'clock de Paulette Darty
- La Maison moderne (1902)
- Ville de Nîmes. Fêtes de charité 13, 14 et 16 février 1904
- Scala (1901)
- Series for Saharet (1902)
- Jane Avril
- Erard Pianos
- Reuter's soap for the complexion and toilet
- Quinquina Vouvray au vin blanc, apéritif exquis...
- Palais de glace
- Mephisto looping the loop
- Lucy Florval (1901)
- Folies-Bergère. Ida Fuller (1901)
- Folies-Bergère. American' Sing' and Dancer'
- Comtesse de R... dans ses fantaisies japonaises (1908)
- Quinquina Vouvray au vin blanc, apéritif exquis, Ernest Bourin, Tours
