= Marie-Anne Desmarest =

French writer (1904–1973)

- Born: Anne-Marie During; May 17, 1904; France
- Died: March 4, 1973 (aged 68); Issy-les-Moulineaux, France
- Occupation: Novelist
- Spouses: Henri Desmarest; Roger Leroy
- Writing career
- Language: French
- Genre: Romance novels

Marie-Anne Desmarest (May 17, 1904 – March 4, 1973) was a French writer.

She was born Anne-Marie During in Mulhouse. She was married twice: first to Henri Desmarest and later to Roger Leroy. Desmarest wrote romance novels. She died in Issy-les-Moulineaux at the age of 68.

== Selected works ==
- La Passion de Jeanne Rieber (1935), received the Prix de l'Alsace littéraire
- Torrents (1938), received the Prix Max Barthou de l'Académie française
- L'Autel renversé (1941)
- Aurore (1952)
- Les remparts de Saint-Paul (1959(
- A la recherche de l'amour (1960)
- L'Appel mystérieux (1968)
