= Jane Avril =

French can-can dancer (1868–1943)

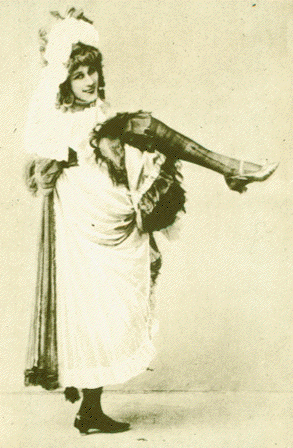
- Photo of Avril c. 1893
- Born: Jeanne Louise Beaudon; 9 June 1868; Belleville, 20th arrondissement of Paris, Île-de-France, France
- Died: 17 January 1943 (aged 74)
- Resting place: Père Lachaise Cemetery, Paris, France
- Occupation: Can-can dancer
- Spouse: Maurice Biais (1911-1926) (his death)

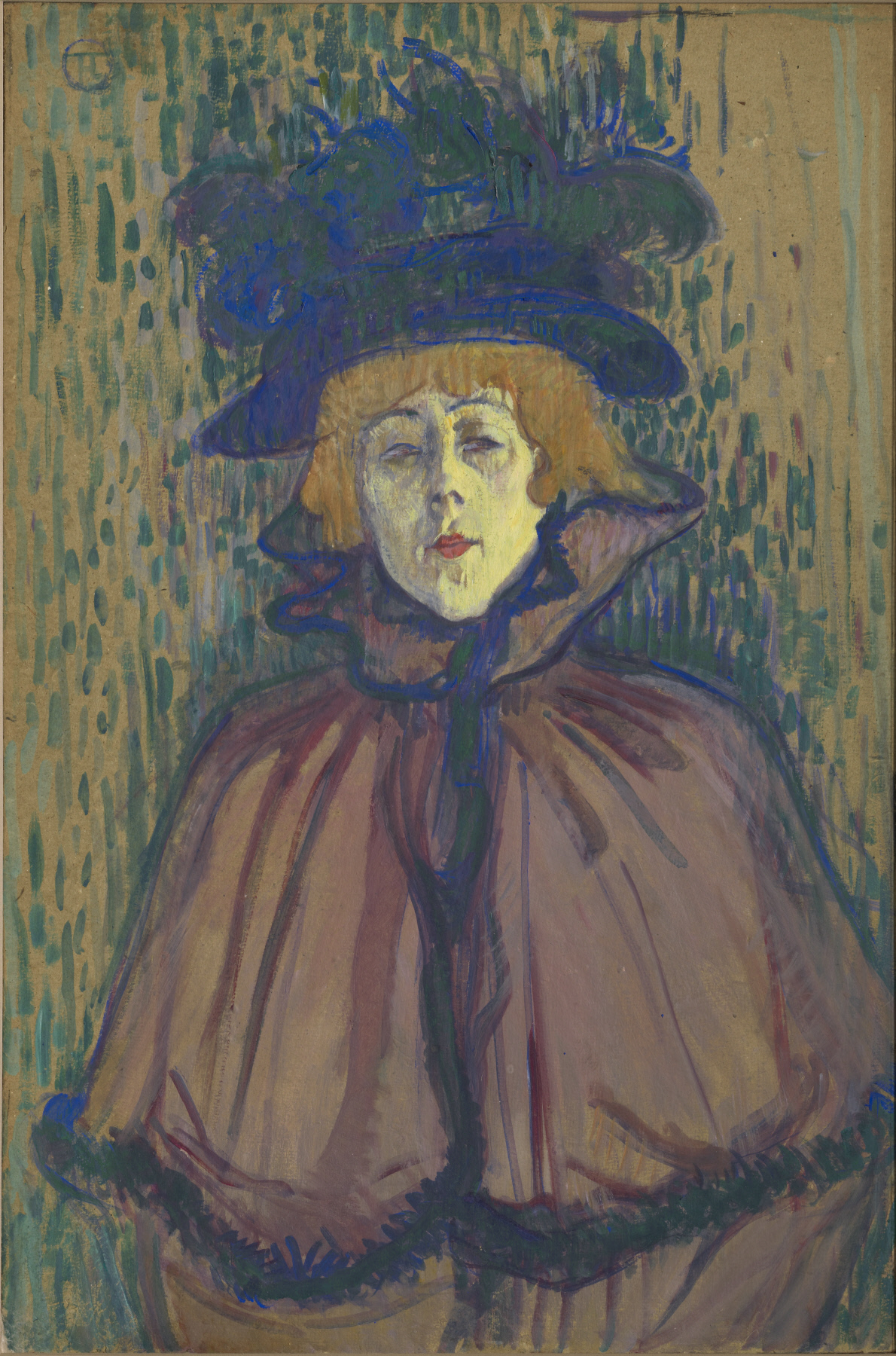
Jane Avril, c. 1892, by Toulouse-Lautrec

Jane Avril (9 June 1868 – 17 January 1943) was a French can-can dancer at the Moulin Rouge in Paris and a frequent subject of painter Henri de Toulouse-Lautrec's art. Extremely thin and "given to jerky movements and sudden contortions", she was nicknamed La Mélinite, after an explosive.

== Biography ==
=== Early life ===
She was born Jeanne Louise Beaudon on 9 June 1868 in Belleville, a neighborhood in the 20th arrondissement of Paris (though her biographer, Jose Shercliff—whose account of the dancer's life is highly romanticised—employed the surname “Richepin” in her publication). Her mother Léontine Clarisse Beaudon was a prostitute who was known as "La Belle Élise," and her father was an Italian aristocrat named Luigi de Font who separated from her mother when Avril was two years old. Avril was raised by her grandparents in the countryside until her mother took her back with the intent of turning her into a prostitute.

Living in poverty and abused by her alcoholic mother, she ran away from home as a teenager, (Note: Sources state this was either at the age of 13 or 16.) and was eventually admitted to the Salpêtrière Hospital in December 1882, with the movement disorder known as "St Vitus' Dance", with symptoms that included nervous tics, thrashing of limbs, and rhythmic swaying. Under the care of Dr. Jean-Martin Charcot, an expert on "female hysteria", she received various kinds of treatment, and claimed in her biography that, when she discovered dance at a social ball for employees and patients at the hospital celebrating Mardi Gras, she was cured; a modern biography of her argues that this story is unlikely, however, as she was discharged in June 1884, months before any Mardi Gras celebration would take place.

Regardless, she incorporated some of the mannerisms into her dance style, but it is unclear if she was actually afflicted by the condition, (Note: Maximillien de Lafayette's biography of her claims that Avril's mother had her committed against her will and that the doctors soon discovered she was unaffected by disorder.) or if it was simply a marketing strategy, as nervous conditions such as hysteria were associated with elegance by writers of the time (or both). She was certainly known for her unusual style, which was described as "an orchid in a frenzy." The Belgian author Frantz Jourdain described her as "this exquisite creature, nervous and neurotic, the captivating flower of artistic corruption and of sickly grace."

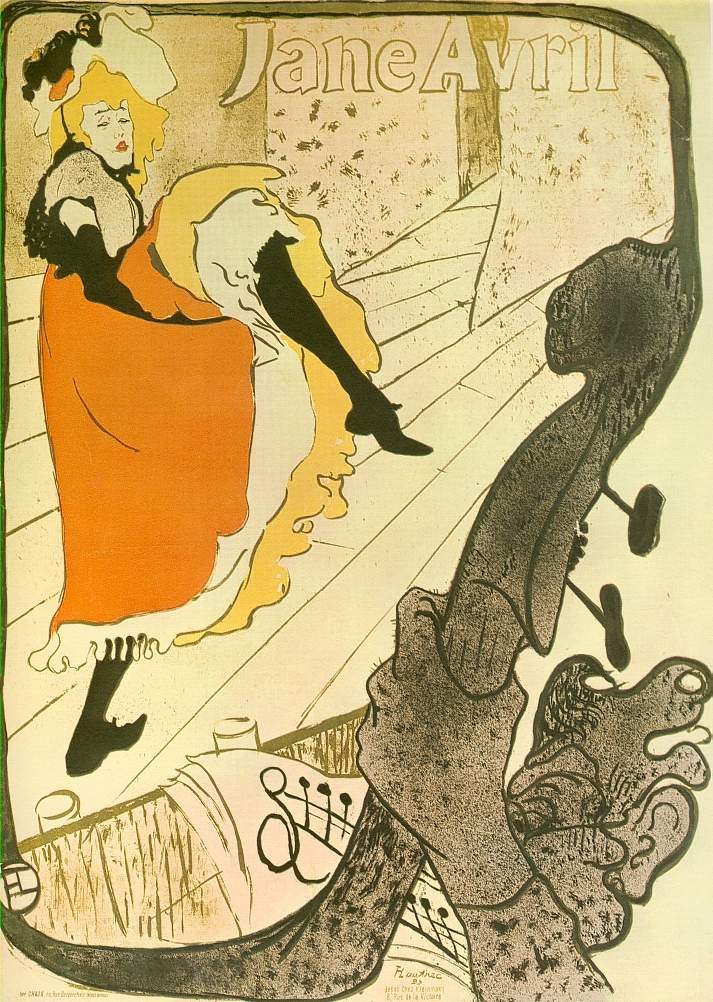
Jane Avril, poster, 1893, by Toulouse-Lautrec

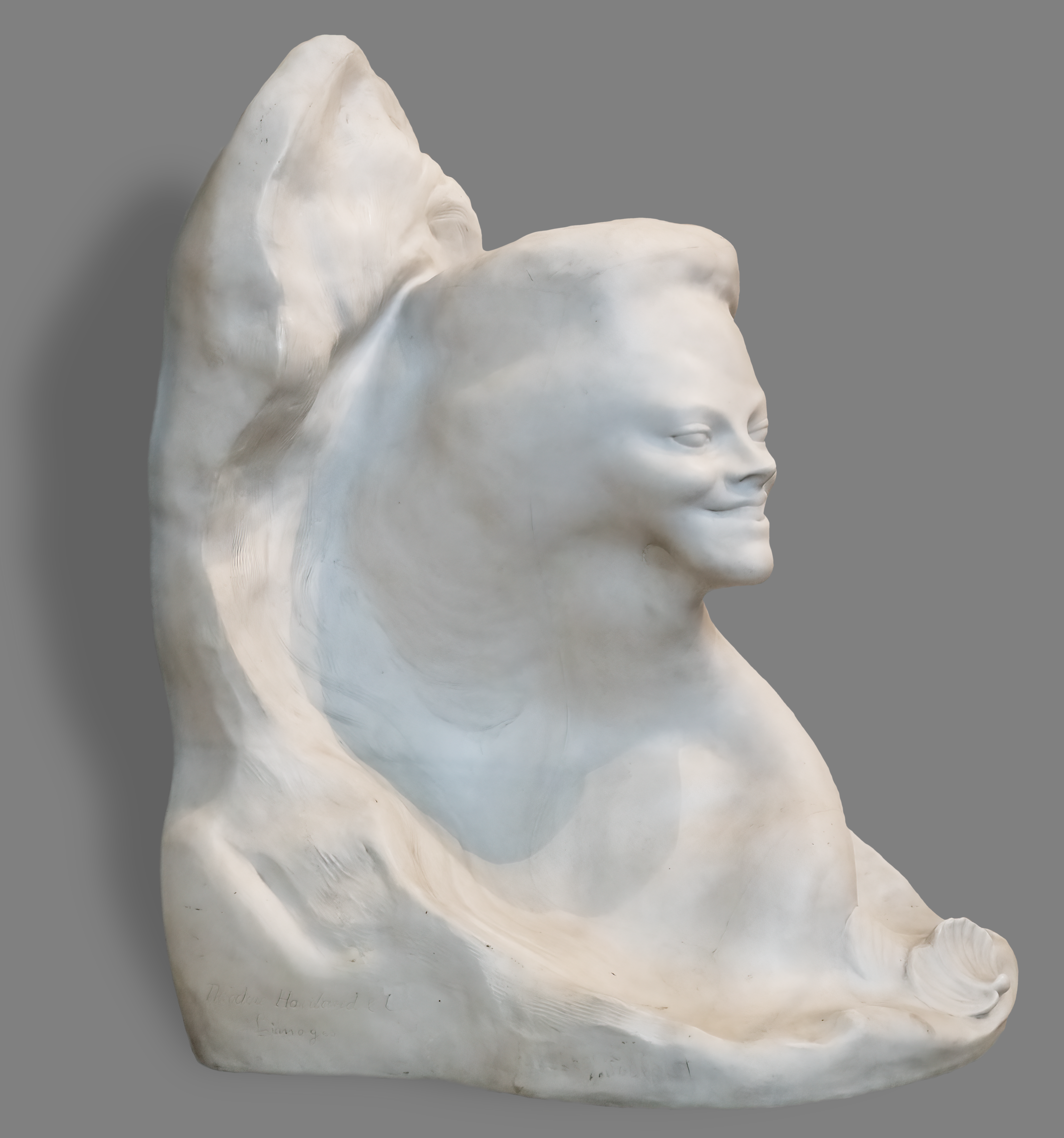
Bust of Jane Avril on a wave, 1898, by Antoine Bourdelle

On leaving the hospital, after a failed romance with a doctor, Avril pondered committing suicide, but was taken in by Parisian prostitutes. Working at whatever day jobs were available, including as a secretary to Arsène Houssaye, as a rider or acrobat at the Hippodrome de l'Alma and as a cashier at the Exposition Universelle in 1889, at night, she pursued a career in dancing by performing at local dance halls and cafés-concerts. In 1888, she met the writer René Boylesve (1867–1926) who became her lover. Using the stage name Jane Avril, suggested by an English lover, she built a reputation that eventually allowed her to make a living as a full-time dancer. During this time, she became known by various nicknames: La Mélinite after an explosive, L'Etrange ("The Strange One"), and Jane la Folle ("Jane the Crazy").

=== Peak career ===
Hired by the Moulin Rouge nightclub in 1889, within a few years, she headlined at the Jardin de Paris, one of the major cafés-concerts on the Champs-Élysées. To advertise the show, Henri de Toulouse-Lautrec painted her portrait on a poster that elevated her stature in the entertainment world even further. Lautrec captured her mental and physical absorption in her movements. The popularity of the can-can became such that Avril travelled with a dance troupe to perform in London in 1896.

In 1895, Louise Weber, one of the star dancers of Paris at the time, known by her stage name La Goulue ("The Glutton"), left the Moulin Rouge, and Avril was chosen to replace her. Graceful, soft-spoken, and melancholic, Avril gave a dance presentation that was the opposite of the very boisterous La Goulue. Nevertheless, the club's patrons adored her, and she became one of the most recognizable names in Parisian nightlife. Unlike most dancers, she frequently performed alone. Avril's elegant performance quality was called "Botticelli-like" by painter William Rothenstein. A younger dancer, May Milton, arrived in Paris in 1895 and she and Avril had a short but passionate affair. From another liaison, she bore a son, and beginning in 1901, appeared in theatre, taking roles in Henrik Ibsen's Peer Gynt, as well as a stage adaptation of Claudine at School by Colette.

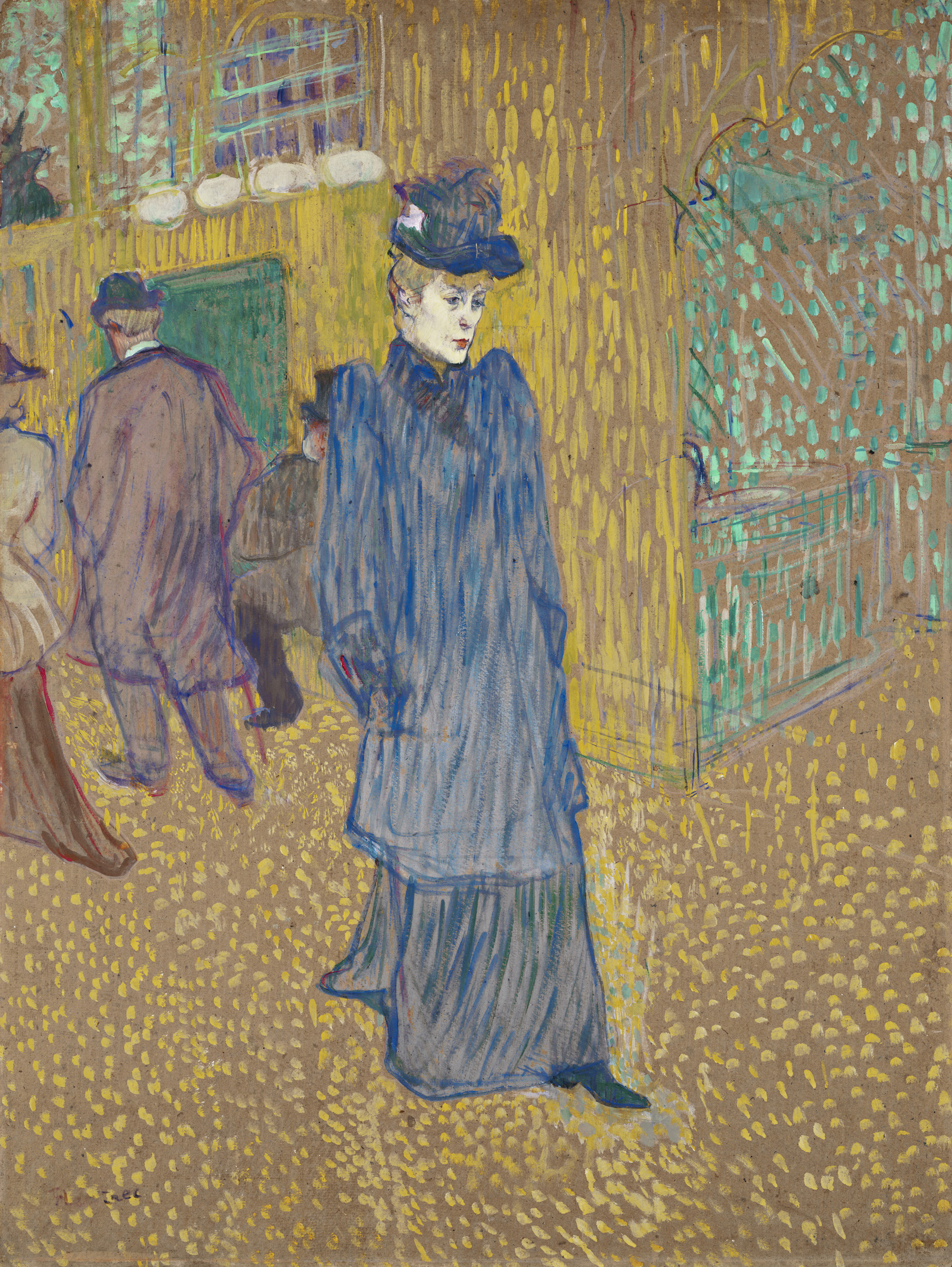
Jane Avril Leaving the Moulin Rouge, 1893, by Henri de Toulouse-Lautrec, Oil on Cardboard

Toulouse-Lautrec also depicted Avril as a private individual. He frequently painted her as an audience member, or walking in the streets of Paris. In one painting he shows her leaving the Moulin Rouge. Avril was not just Toulouse-Lautrec's muse, but she was also part of his social circle.

=== Life after performing ===
In 1905, Avril retired from performing altogether and in 1911 married the French artist, Maurice Biais (1872–1926), who adopted her son. They moved to a home in Jouy-en-Josas on the outskirts of Paris. However, Biais suffered from lung disease and the couple separated in the 1920s, with Biais moving to the south of France, where he died. She was bankrupted by the Great Depression and died on 17 January 1943 (aged 74) in poverty and obscurity. She was interred in the Biais family plot in Paris' Père Lachaise Cemetery.

=== In popular culture ===
Zsa Zsa Gabor portrayed Avril in the original Moulin Rouge (1952); half a century later, the semi-fictionalized character was reinterpreted by Nicole Kidman in Moulin Rouge! (2001). Avril is one of the characters in Per Olov Enquist's book The Book of Blanche and Marie, which portrays the lives of Marie "Blanche" Wittman and Marie Curie.

== Bibliography ==
- Shercliff, Jose (1952). Jane Avril of the Moulin Rouge. London: Jarrolds Publishers, Ltd. OCLC 1477795.
- Avril, Jane; Ramiro, Érastène (2019) [2005]. Mes memoires (in French). Paris: La Gibecière à Mots. ISBN 9782374633206.
