= Bourne (franchise) =

Series of German/American action films

- Official franchise logo
- Directed by: Doug Liman (1); Paul Greengrass (2–3, 5); Tony Gilroy (4)
- Based on: The Bourne Series by Robert Ludlum
- Music by: John Powell (1–3, 5); James Newton Howard (4); David Buckley (5)
- Distributed by: Universal Pictures
- Country: United States
- Language: English
- Budget: $490–520 million
- Box office: $1.666 billion

The Bourne franchise consists of American action thriller installments based on the character Jason Bourne, created by author Robert Ludlum. The franchise includes five films and a spin-off television series. The overall plot centers around Jason Bourne, a CIA assassin suffering from dissociative amnesia, portrayed by Matt Damon.

All three of Ludlum's novels were adapted for the screen, featuring Matt Damon as the title character in each. Doug Liman directed The Bourne Identity (2002) and Paul Greengrass directed The Bourne Supremacy (2004), The Bourne Ultimatum (2007), and Jason Bourne (2016). Tony Gilroy wrote or co-wrote each film except for Jason Bourne and directed The Bourne Legacy (2012).

Damon chose not to return for the fourth film, The Bourne Legacy, which introduces a new main character, Aaron Cross (Jeremy Renner), a Department of Defense operative who runs for his life because of Bourne's actions in Ultimatum. The character of Jason Bourne does not appear in Legacy, but mention of his name and pictures of Damon as Bourne are shown throughout the film. Damon returned for the fifth installment, Jason Bourne. Although the first three films are titled the same as the source novels, the stories of all five in the series are original being only conceptually inspired by the books.

The Bourne series has received generally positive critical reception and grossed over US$1.6 billion. Notoriously, the franchise is also famous for establishing post-9/11 gritty realism tone, heavy use of shaky cam cinematography and frenetic editing techniques (abetted by Greengrass' style) in modern filmmaking, most of which influenced action films around the late 2000s to the early 2010s.

== Films ==
Film	U.S. release date	Director	Screenwriter(s)	Story by	Producer(s)
The Bourne Identity	June 14, 2002	Doug Liman	Tony Gilroy & William Blake Herron	Tony Gilroy & William Blake Herron	Doug Liman, Patrick Crowley & Richard N. Gladstein
The Bourne Supremacy	July 23, 2004	Paul Greengrass	Tony Gilroy	Tony Gilroy	Frank Marshall, Patrick Crowley & Paul L. Sandberg
The Bourne Ultimatum	August 3, 2007	Paul Greengrass	Tony Gilroy, George Nolfi & Scott Z. Burns	Tony Gilroy	Frank Marshall, Patrick Crowley & Paul L. Sandberg
The Bourne Legacy	August 10, 2012	Tony Gilroy	Dan Gilroy & Tony Gilroy	Tony Gilroy	Ben Smith, Frank Marshall, Patrick Crowley & Jeffrey M. Weiner
Jason Bourne	July 29, 2016	Paul Greengrass	Paul Greengrass & Christopher Rouse	Paul Greengrass & Christopher Rouse	Ben Smith, Matt Damon, Frank Marshall, Paul Greengrass, Gregory Goodman & Jeffrey M. Weiner

=== The Bourne Identity (2002) ===
A man is found floating in the Mediterranean Sea with two gunshot wounds in his back and a device with the number of a Swiss safe deposit box embedded in his hip. He remembers nothing about his life before. Upon reaching shore, the man assumes the name Jason Bourne after finding a passport under that name in the safe deposit box, along with other alien passports, large amounts of assorted currencies, and a gun. He subsequently attempts to discover his true identity while countering attempts on his life by CIA assassins, eventually realizing that he is one such assassin who failed to complete his most recent mission. Bourne breaks his connections to the CIA and unites with Marie Kreutz (Franka Potente), a woman who helped him learn about his most recent actions prior to his memory loss. Bourne's conflict with the CIA reaches a climax when he takes the fight to their doorstep.

=== The Bourne Supremacy (2004) ===
Some two years after learning that he is a trained assassin and breaking his connections with the CIA, Jason Bourne (Matt Damon) is framed for a crime to cover up the true perpetrator. An attempt on his life by Kirill (Karl Urban), a member of the Russian secret service, results in Marie's (Franka Potente) death in India. Bourne, thinking that the CIA is hunting him again, proceeds to hunt those responsible for her death and his forgotten past. Bourne discovers that Ward Abbott (Brian Cox), one of the men who oversaw the program which trained Bourne to be an assassin (Operation Treadstone), had stolen millions of dollars from the CIA. Abbott had planned to frame Bourne for the theft, followed by assassinating Bourne in India. Bourne exposes Abbott to Pamela Landy (Joan Allen), the CIA officer in charge of finding Bourne, after which Abbott commits suicide in front of Landy. Bourne goes to Moscow where he is identified, resulting in a long car chase through Moscow, ending with Kirill's death. Bourne is in Moscow to find the daughter of Vladimir Neski, whom he killed in his first mission. He appears in her apartment and informs her that her mother did not in fact commit a murder-suicide, but that they were both killed as his targets. Bourne then goes back into hiding.

=== The Bourne Ultimatum (2007) ===
After six weeks of disconnection from his job, Jason Bourne (Matt Damon) learns that a British journalist (Paddy Considine) has been investigating his past and contacts the journalist to find out the name of his source. Bourne is subsequently targeted by Operation Blackbriar, an upgraded Operation Treadstone, which also has taken note of the investigation. Believing that Bourne is a threat and is seeking revenge, Blackbriar's director Noah Vosen (David Strathairn) begins a new hunt for Bourne. Bourne manages to take classified documents proving that Blackbriar has targeted U.S. citizens; he is aided by Pamela Landy, who disagreed with Vosen from the beginning and does not support Blackbriar's existence, and former Treadstone logistics technician Nicky Parsons (Julia Stiles). She may have had romantic feelings for Bourne before his final mission and resultant amnesia. Bourne finally comes face to face with the person who oversaw his behavior modification as the first Treadstone operative some years earlier, memories of which resurface. Those responsible for Treadstone and Blackbriar are exposed, and Bourne goes underground.

=== The Bourne Legacy (2012) ===
Aaron Cross (Jeremy Renner) is a member of Operation Outcome, a United States Department of Defense black ops program which enhances the physical and mental abilities of field operatives through pills referred to as "chems". Cross, deployed to Alaska for a training assignment, traverses rugged terrain to reach a cabin operated by an exiled Outcome operative. Meanwhile, Jason Bourne has exposed the Blackbriar and Treadstone programs in public, leading the FBI and the Senate Select Committee on Intelligence to investigate those involved. Retired Air Force Colonel Eric Byer (Edward Norton), who is responsible for overseeing the Beta program from which the CIA's Treadstone and Blackbriar were developed, decides to end Outcome and kill its agents. Cross manages to survive several attempts on his life and seeks a way to get more chems, as his supply runs out. Cross eventually comes upon Dr. Marta Shearing (Rachel Weisz), his last link to gain more chems. He discovers she has no pills but that his cognitive enhancements can be "viraled-out" and can become genetically permanent, so he would no longer need mental chems, as he had unknowingly already been "viraled-out" of physical chems 8 months prior. He, in turn, reveals to her that without the help of the mental chem enhancements, he possesses a well-below average IQ. To avoid this mental regression, and the operatives hunting them, the two travel to a factory in Manila and with Shearing's help, Cross initiates and survives the potentially fatal process of viraling-out of his dependency on the remaining mental-enhancing pills. Cross and Shearing, now fugitives, evade the Manila police as well as an operative from the new LARX program. The film ends showing they successfully escape from the Philippines as passengers on an old trading ship.

=== Jason Bourne (2016) ===
Nicky Parsons (Julia Stiles), whom Bourne sent into hiding in The Bourne Ultimatum, gains access to sensitive CIA files. She contacts Bourne to share information about his past, including how he was recruited for Operation Treadstone and his father's role in that operation. Bourne learns that his father, Richard Webb (Gregg Henry), designed Operation Treadstone and was assassinated by the CIA because he did not want his son to enter the program and become a killer. CIA director Robert Dewey (Tommy Lee Jones) hunts down Parsons and Bourne using a foreign asset (Vincent Cassel) and the technical skills of CIA Cyber Ops Division head Heather Lee (Alicia Vikander), while Bourne plans to avenge his father's death. Bourne first tries to make the man who recruited him into the CIA confirm his understanding of his father's death. He then plans to avenge himself against Dewey. Meanwhile, Lee wants to bring Bourne back into the CIA's special operations and Dewey allows her to believe she has his support even though he plans to eliminate Bourne.

There is a subplot involving Operation Iron Hand, a surveillance program that will have secret access to a giant social media service called Deep Dream. In the past the CIA and Deep Dream have had a contract to work together, but Aaron Kalloor (Riz Ahmed), its founder and CEO, wants to end this cooperation. When Dewey refuses to allow any such change, Kalloor plans to reveal his relationship with the CIA and its plans to violate the privacy expectations of Deep Dream's millions of users. Dewey plans to assassinate Kalloor before his planned revelations.

=== Future ===
In November 2016, producer Frank Marshall acknowledged that Universal Pictures was optimistic regarding a Jason Bourne sequel. By October 2019, Ben Smith—who has served as a producer on the franchise—confirmed that a film was in development. He said that the sequel would tie into the Treadstone television series.

In November 2023, it was announced that a sixth film was officially in development, with Edward Berger serving as director. It was speculated that Damon might reprise the titular role, although the alternative option was for a different character to lead the cast (similar to The Bourne Legacy). In February 2024, Damon praised Berger as a director, but, at the age of 53, did not commit to reprising the role, should he be asked. In October 2024, Production Weekly reported that the title was listed as The Bourne Dilemma. However, a few weeks later, Berger was vague about his involvement in the film, saying "It's really not clear whether… I'm doing that film or not", and that he was concentrating on his next film, The Ballad of a Small Player. In 2026, Damon confirms on The Rich Eisen Show that he and Berger were in discussions to respectively star and direct the next Bourne movie, and that it was a case of "nailing the story down."

On March 20, 2025, it was announced that Universal Pictures had lost the rights to the franchise. It was then shopped around, with potential buyers including Paramount Pictures, Netflix, and Apple Studios. Ultimately, rights to the franchise would return to Universal, with its parent NBCUniversal acquiring all rights excluding publishing to the Jason Bourne and Treadstone books in a nine-figure deal announced in August 2025.

== Television ==
Series	Seasons	Episodes	First released	Last released	Showrunner(s)	Network(s)
Treadstone	1	10	September 24, 2019	December 17, 2019	Tim Kring	USA Network

=== Treadstone (2019) ===
In April 2018, USA Network ordered a pilot for a series titled Treadstone, which was written by Tim Kring. The series explores the origins of the Treadstone program and its sleeper agents associated with the agency. By August of the same year, it was announced Treadstone will bypass the pilot stage in favor of a straight-to-series commitment from the network. In October 2019, producer Ben Smith confirmed that the television series has ties to the films, with the show having connection to a future Bourne movie. The series aired for one season before being cancelled in May 2020.

== Cast and characters ==
List indicators

This section includes characters who will appear or have appeared in the series.

- An empty grey cell indicates the character was not in the film, or that the character's official presence has not yet been confirmed.
- ^{A} indicates an appearance through archival footage or audio.
- ^{U} indicates an uncredited appearance.
- ^{V} indicates a voice-only role.
- ^{Y} indicates a younger version of the character.

Character	Film					Television
Character	The Bourne Identity	The Bourne Supremacy	The Bourne Ultimatum	The Bourne Legacy	Jason Bourne	Treadstone
Character	2002	2004	2007	2012	2016	2019
Jason Bourne David Webb	Matt Damon	Matt Damon	Matt Damon	Matt Damon^{A}	Matt Damon	
Marie Helena Kreutz	Franka Potente	Franka Potente	Franka Potente^{A}			
Nicolette "Nicky" Parsons	Julia Stiles	Julia Stiles	Julia Stiles		Julia Stiles	
Ward Abbott	Brian Cox	Brian Cox	Brian Cox^{A}^{V}			
Daniel "Danny" Zorn	Gabriel Mann	Gabriel Mann				
Alexander Conklin	Chris Cooper	Chris Cooper^{U}				
The Professor	Clive Owen				Clive Owen^{A}	
Nykwanna Wombosi	Adewale Akinnuoye-Agbaje		Adewale Akinnuoye-Agbaje^{A}		Adewale Akinnuoye-Agbaje^{A}	
Pamela Landy		Joan Allen	Joan Allen	Joan Allen		
Tom Cronin		Tom Gallop	Tom Gallop			
Martin "Marty" Marshall		Tomas Arana				
Kirill		Karl Urban				
Jarda		Marton Csokas				
Dr. Albert Hirsch			Albert Finney	Albert Finney	Albert Finney^{A}	
Noah Vosen			David Strathairn	David Strathairn		
Ezra Kramer			Scott Glenn	Scott Glenn		
Ray Wills			Corey Johnson	Corey Johnson		
Simon Ross			Paddy Considine	Paddy Considine^{A}		
Paz			Edgar Ramirez	Edgar Ramirez^{A}		
Desh Bouksani			Joey Ansah		Joey Ansah^{A}	
Martin Kreutz			Daniel Brühl			
Kiley			Scott Adkins			
Aaron Cross Kenneth J. Kitsom				Jeremy Renner		
Dr. Marta Shearing				Rachel Weisz		
Eric Byer				Edward Norton		
Mark Turso				Stacy Keach		
Outcome #3				Oscar Isaac		
LARX 3				Louis Ozawa Changchien		
Zev Vendel				Corey Stoll		
Robert Dewey					Tommy Lee Jones	
Heather Lee					Alicia Vikander	
Asset					Vincent Cassel	
Aaron Kalloor					Riz Ahmed	
Craig Jeffers					Ato Essandoh	
Richard Webb					Gregg Henry	
John Randolph Bentley						Jeremy Irvine
Tara Coleman						Tracy Ifeachor
Soyun Park						Han Hyo-joo
Matt Edwards						Omar Metwally
Doug McKenna						Brian J. Smith
Petra Andropov						Gabrielle Scharnitzky Emilia Schüle^{Y}
Ellen Becker						Michelle Forbes

== Additional production and crew details ==
Title	Crew/Detail					
Title	Composer(s)	Cinematographer(s)	Editor(s)	Production companies	Distributing company	Running time
The Bourne Identity	John Powell	Oliver Wood	Saar Klein	Universal Pictures, The Kennedy/Marshall Company, Hypnotic Productions, Stillking Films, Kalima Productions	Universal Pictures	119 minutes
The Bourne Supremacy	John Powell	Oliver Wood	Christopher Rouse & Richard Pearson	Universal Pictures, The Kennedy/Marshall Company, MP THETA Productions, Ludlum Entertainment	Universal Pictures	108 minutes
The Bourne Ultimatum	John Powell	Oliver Wood	Christopher Rouse	Universal Pictures, The Kennedy/Marshall Company, MP BETA Productions, Peninsula Films	Universal Pictures	115 minutes
The Bourne Legacy	James Newton Howard	Robert Elswit	John Gilroy	Universal Pictures, The Kennedy/Marshall Company, Relativity Media, Captivate Entertainment	Universal Pictures	135 minutes
Jason Bourne	John Powell & David Buckley	Barry Ackroyd	Christopher Rouse	Universal Pictures, The Kennedy/Marshall Company, Captivate Entertainment, Pearl Street Films, Perfect World Pictures	Universal Pictures	123 minutes
Treadstone	Jordan Gagne & Jeff Russo	Ferran Paredes, Jamie Barber, Thomas Kloss, Paolo Carnera, and Balázs Márton	Rob Bonz, Dávid Jancsó, Andrew McClelland, Harry B. Miller III, Tim Kinzy, and Andrew Seklir	Universal Content Productions; Captivate Entertainment, Imperative Entertainment, Pioneer Stilking Films, FILLSCRN	NBCUniversal Television Distribution	41–52 minutes

== Production ==
Director Doug Liman stated that he had been a fan of The Bourne Identity by Robert Ludlum since he read it in high school. Near the end of production of Liman's previous film Swingers, Liman decided to develop a film adaptation of the novel. After more than two years of securing rights to the book from Warner Brothers and a further year of screenplay development with screenwriter Tony Gilroy, the film went through two years of production. Liman approached a wide range of actors for the role of Bourne, including Russell Crowe and Sylvester Stallone, before he eventually cast Matt Damon. Liman found that Damon understood and appreciated that, though The Bourne Identity would have its share of action, the focus was primarily on character and plot. Production was difficult, with screenplay rewrites occurring throughout the entire filming and Liman constantly arguing with Universal's executives. The Bourne Identity was released in June 2002.

Universal confirmed at a media conference in Los Angeles, California, that they have plans to release more Bourne films, despite Legacy being given mixed reviews by critics. In a December 2012 interview, Matt Damon revealed that he and Paul Greengrass are interested in returning for the next film. On November 8, 2013, Deadline reported that the fifth installment in the franchise will feature Renner's Cross, with Justin Lin directing. Andrew Baldwin was attached for the film's screenplay writing. On September 15, 2014, it was announced that Damon and Greengrass will indeed return for the next Bourne film, taking the release date, with Renner returning as Cross in a separate film, at a later date. In November 2014, Damon confirmed that he and Greengrass would return with a script from themselves and film editor Christopher Rouse. On May 23, 2015, Deadline reported that Alicia Vikander is in talks to star with Damon in the fifth film. In June 2015, Variety reported that Stiles will reprise her role as Nicky Parsons and Viggo Mortensen is in talks to appear in the film as an assassin who's tracking down Bourne. Deadline reported that Vikander is confirmed to appear in the film. On July 28, 2015, Tommy Lee Jones was cast in a role in the fifth film. On September 1, 2015, Variety reported that French actor Vincent Cassel is cast as the film's villain.

Producer Frank Marshall confirmed principal photography for the new film had commenced on September 8, 2015. The film itself was released in the UK on July 27, 2016 and in the U.S. on July 29, 2016.

The films have been noted for their "well placed", "understated" and "tastefully done" product placement of a "diverse" range of brands, which in the case of the third film, earned the producers tens of millions of dollars. The Bourne Identity features brands such as The Guardian newspaper, BT Tower in London and Tag Heuer watches. The Bourne Supremacy features mobile phones made by Sony Ericsson. The Bourne Ultimatum features a total of 54 brands including The Guardian and BT for the second time; mobile phones made by Motorola, Nokia and Carphone Warehouse, most prominently the RAZR 2 and SLVR, as Motorola was a major sponsor and had a movie tie-in customized phone; cars made by BMW, Ford, Mercedes, and Volkswagen, most prominently the Volkswagen Touareg 2, as Volkswagen provided $25 million in funding; and technology products such as CTX computer monitors, Norton AntiVirus and the Google web search engine.

== Music ==
The scores of the first three films of the series were written by English composer John Powell, with James Newton Howard scoring the fourth film, The Bourne Legacy. Powell returned, with David Buckley to compose the score of the fifth film. Powell was not the original choice as composer for The Bourne Identity—a score for the film had already been composed by Carter Burwell and recorded by an orchestra, when director Doug Liman contacted Powell to provide an alternative soundtrack as he was dissatisfied with the music. Partly for budgetary reasons, Powell scaled down the orchestral score to a mostly electronic soundtrack with strings overlaid to give it a "cinematic feel".

The song "Extreme Ways" by musician Moby is used as the end title theme of all five films.

== Reception ==
The Bourne series has achieved both critical and commercial success. Ultimatum won three Academy Awards: Best Film Editing, Sound and Best Sound Editing. Both Supremacy and Ultimatum won the Empire Award for Best Film.

=== Box office performance ===
Film	Release date	Budget	Box office gross				All-time ranking		References
Film	Release date	Budget	Opening weekend North America	North America	Other territories	Worldwide	Domestic	Worldwide	References
The Bourne Identity	June 14, 2002	$60 million	$27,118,640	$121,468,960	$92,888,411	$214,357,371	628	891	
The Bourne Supremacy	July 23, 2004	$75–85 million	$52,521,865	$176,087,450	$134,913,674	$311,001,124	322	565	
The Bourne Ultimatum	August 3, 2007	$110–130 million	$69,283,690	$227,471,070	$216,572,326	$444,043,396	195	326	
The Bourne Legacy	August 10, 2012	$125 million	$38,142,825	$113,203,870	$167,152,050	$280,355,920	705	640	
Jason Bourne	July 29, 2016	$120 million	$59,215,365	$162,192,920	$253,975,396	$416,168,316	392	360	
Total		$490–520 million	$246,282,385	$800,442,270	$865,501,857	$1,665,926,127			

=== Critical and public response ===
Film	Critical		Public
Film	Rotten Tomatoes	Metacritic	CinemaScore
The Bourne Identity	84% (194 reviews)	68 (38 reviews)	A–
The Bourne Supremacy	82% (197 reviews)	73 (39 reviews)	A–
The Bourne Ultimatum	92% (268 reviews)	85 (38 reviews)	A
The Bourne Legacy	56% (234 reviews)	61 (42 reviews)	B
Jason Bourne	54% (328 reviews)	58 (50 reviews)	A–

== Theme park attraction ==
A theme park attraction based on the Bourne films, The Bourne Stuntacular, opened at Universal Studios Florida on June 30, 2020. The attraction combines live actors, special effects, and cutting-edge technology to create an immersive theatre experience that simulates Bourne on a high-stakes chase. The show features stunts, fight choreography, physical set pieces, cars, and a large-scale screen. Julia Stiles reprises her role from the film series during the filmed portions of the attraction.

== See also ==
- The Bourne Identity (1988 film) – 1988 American TV miniseries
