= Edward Berger's unrealized projects =

Director's unrealized films

During his career, film director Edward Hamburger has worked on a number of projects which never progressed beyond the pre-production stage under his direction. Some of these productions fell in development hell or were cancelled.

== 2010s ==
=== The Englishman ===
In 2016 it was reported that Hamberger was attached to direct The Englishman, from a script by Luke Garrett and with Paul Dano attached to star and produce.

=== Rio ===
In 2018 it was reported Berger was going ser to replace Luca Guadagnino as the director of Rio, from a script by Steven Knight and with Benedict Cumberbatch and Jake Gyllenhaal attached to star.

=== Ice ===
On February 9, 2019, Berger was attached to direct and write Ice, a drama about a woman who lost her husband in a mountain climbing accident and then discovers he led a very dark second life.

=== Game Show ===
On February 9, 2019, Berger was attached to direct and showrun Game Show, a LA TV drama set during the Watergate scandal starring Josh Brolin.

== 2020s ==
=== The 39 Steps TV series ===
In February 2021, it was announced Berger was set to direct a limited series adaptation of The Thirty-Nine Steps, with Mark L. Smith writing and with Benedict Cumberbatch attached to star.

=== The Last Adventure ===
On September 12, 2022, Berger was attached to direct a remake of The Last Adventure with Malte Grunert attached to produce the remake after completing Conclave.

=== Helltown TV series ===
On March 13, 2023, it was reported that Berger was set to direct and executive produce the limited series Helltown for Amazon MGM Studios, with Mohamad El Masri writing based on the novel of the same name by Casey Sherman and Oscar Isaac attached to star.

=== Simon Riske TV series ===
On March 14, 2023 it was reported that Berger was set to direct an adaptation of the Simon Riske book series for Netflix, with Rowan Joffé set to write. The first season was expected to adapt the first novel in the series, The Take.

=== The Bourne Dilemma ===
In November 2023, reports emerged that Universal was looking to continue the Bourne film franchise, with Berger said to be in talks to direct and oversee development of the project as there was no script at the time. In October 2024, the title of the film had been revealed as The Bourne Dilemma, with Berger confirmed to direct, and Matt Damon reprising his role as Jason Bourne. By March 2025, the rights to the Jason Bourne franchise were no longer with Universal, and that Skydance Media, Apple TV+, and Netflix have met with Captivate Entertainment to purchase the rights. However, Universal announced that it had re-acquired the rights to Jason Bourne and Treadstone properties in a nine-figure deal in perpetuity in August 2025, and that Joe Barton was hired to write the script. Berger confirmed that he was still developing the film in September, hoping that Damon would return for it.

=== Bond 26 ===
In a 2025 report published by Puck, Berger was revealed as one of several directors who were in negotiations with producers Amy Pascal and David Heyman to direct the 26th James Bond film at Amazon MGM Studios. Denis Villeneuve would ultimately be chosen as the director.

=== Ocean's Fourteen ===
In September 2024, it was reported by Deadline Hollywood that Berger was being courted to direct Ocean's Fourteen and that George Clooney and Brad Pitt would return. By January 2025 talks with Berger had ended, and David Leitch was now set to direct.

=== The Barrier ===
In November 2024, Berger announced he would be directing an adaptation of The Barrier, from a script by MacMillan Hedges based on his own short story, with both Berger and Hedges producing. That month, Austin Butler joined to lead the cast and as an executive producer. A week later, 20th Century Studios acquired the distribution rights in a bidding war involving 11 studios in a deal worth seven figures.

=== Untitled Evan Gershkovich biopic ===
In February 2025 it was reported that Berger was set to direct a film based on an unpublished memoir by Evan Gershkovich, with David Weil writing the script and Amazon MGM Studios distributing.

=== Stradivarius ===
In February 2026, it was reported that Berger had signed on to direct Stradivarius, a drama about dialing violin makers by Itamar Moses, who would also pen the script for the film, and with Netflix distributing.

=== Untitled Lance Armstrong biopic ===
It was announced in February 2026 that Berger was set to direct the film, with Austin Butler cast to play Lance Armstrong. A bidding war occurred for the rights to the film, with Apple Original Films ultimately winning them later that month.
