= Treadstone =

2019 American action drama television series

- Release poster
- Genre: Action drama; Conspiracy thriller
- Created by: Tim Kring
- Based on: Operation Treadstone from the Bourne series of novels by Robert Ludlum
- Starring: Jeremy Irvine; Tracy Ifeachor; Han Hyo-joo; Omar Metwally; Brian J. Smith; Gabrielle Scharnitzky; Emilia Schüle; Michelle Forbes
- Composers: Jeff Russo; Jordan Gagne
- Country of origin: United States
- Original language: English
- No. of seasons: 1
- No. of episodes: 10

Production
- Executive producers: Tim Kring; Ramin Bahrani; Ben Smith; Jeffrey Weiner; Justin Levy; Bradley Thomas; Dan Friedkin
- Camera setup: Single-camera
- Running time: 41-52 minutes
- Production companies: Universal Content Productions; Tailwind Productions; Captivate Entertainment; Imperative Entertainment

Original release
- Network: USA Network
- Release: September 24 – December 17, 2019

Treadstone is an American action drama television series created by Tim Kring, who is also the executive producer alongside Ramin Bahrani, Ben Smith, Jeffrey Weiner, Justin Levy, Bradley Thomas, and Dan Friedkin. It is part of the Bourne franchise and serves as both a prequel to The Bourne Identity (2002) and a sequel to Jason Bourne (2016). A "special preview" of the pilot aired on USA Network on September 24, 2019, ahead of its October 15, 2019, premiere. Treadstone received generally mixed reviews from critics and in May 2020, the series was canceled after one season of ten episodes.

== Premise ==
Treadstone explores the origin story and present-day actions of a fictional CIA black-ops program known as Operation Treadstone — a covert program that uses a behavior modification protocol to turn recruits into nearly-superhuman assassins. The series follows sleeper agents across the globe as they are mysteriously 'awakened' to resume their deadly missions. The program breaks down these assassins' personalities, erases their memories, and eliminates their moral code so they can effectively kill targets around the world.

The series explores Treadstone's legacy and begins with an incident in East Berlin in 1973. This involves John Randolph Bentley (Jeremy Irvine), one of the program's agents, who escapes his Soviet captors. The story then zooms to the present day, following a group of assets being "activated" by force or awakened after a moment of high tension.

== Cast ==
=== Main ===
- Jeremy Irvine as John Randolph Bentley
- Tracy Ifeachor as Tara Coleman
- Han Hyo-joo as Soyun Park (Korean: 박소윤; Hanja: 朴素妍)
- Omar Metwally as Matt Edwards
- Brian J. Smith as Doug McKenna
- Gabrielle Scharnitzky as Petra Andropov (Russian: Петра Андропова, Petra Andropova)
  - Emilia Schüle as young Petra
- Michelle Forbes as Ellen Becker

=== Recurring ===
- Michael Gaston as Dan Levine
- Jung-woo Seo as Dae Park (Korean: 박대)
- Min-jun Woo as Jin-woo Park (Korean: 박진우; Hanja: 朴振宇)
- Tess Haubrich as Samantha McKenna
- Patrick Fugit as Stephen Haynes (credited as "Special guest star")
- Lee Jong-hyuk as Colonel Shin (Korean: 신)
- Oliver Walker as Matheson
- Shruti Haasan as Nira Patel (Hindi: नीरा पटेल)
- Merab Ninidze as Yuri Leniov (Note: Russian: Юрий Ленёв, Yuriy Lenov) (present day)
- Tzi Ma as General Chin-Hwa Kwon (Korean: 권진화; Hanja: 权振华)

== Episodes ==
No.	Title	Directed by	Written by	Original release date	U.S. viewers (millions)
1	"The Cicada Protocol"	Ramin Bahrani	Teleplay by : Tim Kring	September 24, 2019 (Note: The pilot episode of Treadstone aired as a "special preview" three weeks before its formal television premiere on October 15, 2019.)	0.81
In 1973 East Berlin, captured CIA operative John Randolph Bentley escapes a Soviet behavior modification program named Cicada. One of his captors, Petra Andropov, gives chase. In present day London, North Korean general Kwon tells Tara Coleman, a former journalist, that the "cicadas" are being activated—with these events being linked to the deactivated Treadstone program, and a missing Cold War nuclear missile named Stiletto Six–but piano teacher Soyun Park is woken up and kills him. In the arctic, oil driller Doug McKenna loses his job and blacks out after receiving a mysterious kill order. An aging Petra is shown to be guarding Stiletto Six in Kursk.
2	"The Kwon Conspiracy"	Alex Graves	Tim Kring	October 22, 2019	0.53
In 1973, Bentley returns to CIA's Berlin station, but flees when they believe he has been turned by his captors. In the present, Coleman locates Kwon's daughter in Paris, and they are pursued by North Korean agents.
3	"The Berlin Proposal"	Alex Graves	Rebecca Dameron and Dave Kalstein	October 29, 2019	0.59
In 1973 East Berlin, Bentley returns to the Cicada facility and finds it empty. In the present, Petra Andropov arrives in Moscow, but her former handlers cut her loose and try to kill her. Agent Matt Edwards, the point of contact between the CIA and Tara, locates a doctor, Martin Wells, who worked on mental conditioning for Treadstone and together they question a suspected asset named Stephen Haynes. Soyun is tasked with finding evidence against her husband's commanding officer. Doug McKenna is visited by a Treadstone cleaner, who is then killed by McKenna's wife Samantha.
4	"The Kentucky Contract"	Brad Anderson	Teleplay by : Tim Walsh and Dave Kalstein; Story by : Tim Walsh	November 5, 2019	0.42
Samantha McKenna reveals to Doug that she was a medical officer for Treadstone. At the CIA, mid-level director Becker pursues leads in Langley about the program. Stephen Haynes kills Dr. Wells and tries to escape from Edwards.
5	"The Bentley Lament"	Brad Anderson	Patrick Aison	November 12, 2019	0.52
Back in 1973, Bentley traces his own footsteps to Budapest. There he finds out that, while under the influence of the Cicada program, he has taken major roles in tortures and killings sanctioned by the KGB, of which he has no memories. In the present day, Doug reluctantly takes the assignment he was ordered to undertake by Treadstone and assassinates a pharmaceutical executive, despite initial resistance to give into his pre-programmed mind control. In North Korea, Soyun is tasked with delivering Stiletto Six documents to another Treadstone assassin, Nira Patel. Tara travels to Ghana and breaks one of her past sources out of prison in order to learn more about Treadstone.
6	"The Hades Awakening"	Wayne Yip	Dave Kalstein and Michael Brandon Guercio	November 19, 2019	0.41
In 1973, Bentley finds himself in an underground hippie joint in Budapest and is given a drug to help calm his stress. He then starts to recollect his memories of being caught by the KGB and being brainwashed into becoming a subject to the Cicada program, along with his memories of killing fellow CIA agents, while under the influence. Just as he remembers everything, the KGB raids the joint and Petra captures him again. In the present day, Doug evades corrupt government forces while Edwards contemplates fighting off Treadstone with the help of Haynes.
7	"The Paradox Andropov"	Wayne Yip	Teleplay by : Marc Bernardin and Dave Kalstein; Story by : Marc Bernardin	November 26, 2019	0.50
As part of her scheme, Petra appears to help Bentley evade KGB forces, manipulating him to believe that his old friend Matheson is still alive and being held in another Cicada program prison. In the present day, Soyun goes undercover to sabotage a colonel who is blackmailing her, while Petra tracks her former boss Yuri Leniov down to Greece and discovers he is selling the Stiletto Six nuclear missile to North Korea. Yuri's men track down Tara's friends and kill one of them to dissuade the others from investigating further.
8	"The McKenna Erasure"	Salli Richardson-Whitfield	Tyler Hisel and Dave Kalstein	December 3, 2019	0.53
In a failed attempt to rescue a man assassinated by Treadstone, Doug manages to kill the asset and takes over his identity to pursue the truth with the help of his wife, Sam. Tara infiltrates the Russian State Military Archive to obtain information on the Stiletto Six project and the Cicada program. Soyun discovers a coup is planned in North Korea with her husband set to be the scapegoat, thus handing herself over to the Americans. Becker authorizes her team to eliminate Haynes and Edwards but Haynes sacrifices himself to increase the likelihood that they will leave Edwards alive.
9	"The Seoul Asylum"	Salli Richardson-Whitfield	Teleplay by : Dave Kalstein; Story by : Nneka Gerstle	December 10, 2019	0.50
After Bentley is recaptured, he and Matheson devise a plan to escape along with a British operative. Matheson kills Meisner who gloats that everything transpiring, even his own death, is part of the KGB's plan. In the present day, Soyun makes a deal with the CIA to help them locate Colonel Shin—the man who was blackmailing her—in exchange for the protection of her family. Ellen Becker is extorted to work for the reactivated Treadstone faction within the agency, while Tara approaches Petra for help to disband Stiletto Six, only for the nursery rhyme ringtone on her phone to awaken and unveil her as a Cicada.
10	"The Cicada Covenant"	Jeremy Webb	Teleplay by : Dave Kalstein; Story by : Jill Snyder	December 17, 2019	0.37
With Becker's help, the Treadstone unit manages to secure the nuclear warhead. Tara is sent to assassinate Yuri Leniov, but fails. While Edwards is on the trail of an active mission Treadstone was to undertake, an attempt is made on his life, only for him to be rescued by Tara. They disappear together. The director of the operations, Dan Levine, is killed by Nira Patel when too many assets go rogue, leading Treadstone to divert its focus on Russia due to Leniov's failure to fulfill his deal. Doug fakes the death of a target in Colombia to buy himself some time to figure out how to tackle his next move while Petra seeks the help of an aged John Randolph Bentley to take down Treadstone.

== Production ==
=== Development ===
On April 12, 2018, it was announced that USA Network had given the production a pilot order. The episode was written by Tim Kring and expected to be directed by Ramin Bahrani, both of whom were also set to act as executive producers alongside Ben Smith, Jeffrey Weiner, Justin Levy, and Bradley Thomas. Production companies involved with the pilot were slated to consist of Universal Cable Productions, Captivate Entertainment, and Imperative Entertainment. On August 16, 2018, it was reported that USA Network had decided to forego the pilot process and instead were issuing the production a straight-to-series order. Additionally, it was reported that Dan Friedkin was joining the series as an executive producer. In May 2020, the series was canceled after one season.

=== Casting ===
On November 8, 2018, it was announced that Jeremy Irvine and Brian J. Smith had been cast in lead roles. On January 14, 2019, it was reported Omar Metwally, Tracy Ifeachor, Han Hyo-joo, Gabrielle Scharnitzky, and Emilia Schüle had joined the main cast. Michelle Forbes, Michael Gaston and Shruti Haasan were added to the cast, with Patrick Fugit and Tess Haubrich also appearing in a recurring capacity.

=== Filming ===
Principal photography for the series had begun by January 2019 in Budapest.

== Reception ==
On the review aggregator website Rotten Tomatoes, 50% of 20 critics' reviews are positive. The website's consensus reads: "While Treadstone is as action-packed and frenetically paced as you'd expect from the Bourne universe, it lacks the narrative momentum and cohesion necessary to set it apart." Metacritic, which uses a weighted average, assigned the series a score of 47 out of 100, based on 7 critics, indicating "mixed or average" reviews.

== Broadcast ==
Outside the United States, the series premiered on Amazon Prime Video on January 10, 2020.

In South Korea, the series premiered on OCN on June 18, 2021.

== Home media ==
The series was released on DVD for Universal Pictures Home Entertainment on March 24, 2020.

== See also ==
- The Sleep Room
- Project MKUltra
