= The Bourne Identity (2002 film) =

2002 film by Doug Liman

- Theatrical release poster
- Directed by: Doug Liman
- Screenplay by: Tony Gilroy; William Blake Herron
- Based on: The Bourne Identity by Robert Ludlum
- Produced by: Doug Liman; Patrick Crowley; Richard N. Gladstein (Note: Gladstein remains credited as producer, but was replaced by Frank Marshall for the majority of production due to a family emergency.)
- Starring: Matt Damon; Franka Potente; Chris Cooper; Clive Owen; Brian Cox; Adewale Akinnuoye-Agbaje
- Cinematography: Oliver Wood
- Edited by: Saar Klein
- Music by: John Powell
- Production companies: Universal Pictures; The Kennedy/Marshall Company; Hypnotic Productions (Note: Universal Pictures is the presenter, co-financer, and co-production company of The Bourne Identity, while The Kennedy/Marshall Company and Hypnotic Productions are the production companies.)
- Distributed by: Universal Pictures (United States and Canada); United International Pictures (International)
- Release dates: June 6, 2002 (Los Angeles); June 14, 2002 (United States)
- Running time: 119 minutes
- Country: United States (Note: Attributed to multiple sources:)
- Language: English
- Budget: $60 million
- Box office: $214 million

The Bourne Identity is a 2002 American action-thriller film directed by Doug Liman and written by Tony Gilroy and William Blake Herron. Based on Robert Ludlum's 1980 novel, it is the first installment in the Bourne franchise, and stars Matt Damon, Franka Potente, Chris Cooper, Clive Owen, Brian Cox, and Adewale Akinnuoye-Agbaje. In the film, Jason Bourne (Damon) has psychogenic amnesia and is forced to fight to unlock his identity and his mysterious connection to the CIA.

Attempts to develop a feature film adaptation of Ludlum's novel first began in 1981 but stalled after being passed to different distributors; Warner Bros. produced a television film adaptation in 1988. Liman revived the feature film project in 1996 and worked with Ludlum and David Self on its screenplay after Gilroy initially declined. Gilroy made several changes to the script upon joining, and Herron made additional contributions. After Damon and Potente were cast, principal photography began in October 2000 and lasted until February 2001; filming took place in Paris, Prague, Imperia, Rome, Mykonos, and Zürich. Production was troubled: the creators frequently clashed with studio executives over delays, costs, last-minute changes, and unexpected reshoots.

Originally set for release in September 2001, Universal Pictures theatrically released it in the United States on June 14, 2002. It received positive reviews from critics and grossed $214 million worldwide on a budget of $60 million. It was followed by the sequels The Bourne Supremacy (2004), The Bourne Ultimatum (2007), The Bourne Legacy (2012) and Jason Bourne (2016).

== Plot ==
In the Mediterranean Sea, Italian fishermen rescue an American man adrift with gunshot wounds in his back. Tending to his wounds, they find he has amnesia but shows fluency in several languages. A tiny laser projector found implanted in his hip gives the number of a safe deposit box in Zurich. While investigating this, he discovers he is highly trained in hand-to-hand combat after incapacitating two Zurich police officers.

In the deposit box he finds various currencies, passports, IDs with different names, and a handgun. The man takes everything but the gun and starts using the name on the American passport, Jason Bourne. After Bourne's departure, a bank employee contacts Operation Treadstone, a CIA black ops program. Its head, Alexander Conklin, issues alerts to police to capture Bourne and assigns three agents – codenamed Castel, Manheim, and the Professor – to kill him.

CIA director of operations Ward Abbott contacts Conklin about a failed assassination attempt against exiled African dictator Wombosi and promises to deal with the agent responsible. Bourne evades the Swiss police by using his U.S. passport to enter the American consulate but is pursued by Marine guards.

Bourne escapes after offering $20,000 to Marie Kreutz, a 26-year-old German woman he saw at the consulate, to drive him to an address in Paris. From the apartment, Bourne contacts a hotel to inquire about the names on his passports. A "John Michael Kane" was registered but died two weeks before in a car crash. Castel ambushes Bourne and Marie in the apartment, but Bourne gets the upper hand. Instead of allowing himself to be interrogated, Castel throws himself from a window to his death.

While searching through Castel's belongings, Marie finds printed out intelligence and surveillance papers of Bourne and herself. Frightened, she agrees to help him. After they evade the police in Marie's car, they spend the night in a Paris hotel.

Wombosi obsesses over the attempt on his life. Conklin, having anticipated this, has planted a body identified as John Michael Kane in a Paris morgue to appear to be the assailant. Wombosi is unconvinced and threatens to report the CIA's actions to the media. The Professor assassinates Wombosi on Conklin's orders.

Bourne, posing as Kane, learns about the failed assassination attempt on Wombosi's yacht, and that the assassin was shot twice in the back during the escape, ultimately realizing that he was responsible. He and Marie take refuge in the French countryside home of Marie's half-brother Eamon and his children.

Under pressure from Abbott to handle the matter, Conklin tracks Bourne's location and sends the Professor to kill him. Bourne mortally wounds the Professor, who reveals their shared connection to Treadstone before dying. Bourne sends Marie, Eamon, and the children away for their protection. He contacts Conklin via the Professor's phone, and they agree to meet alone in Paris.

When Bourne sees that Conklin is not alone, he abandons their meeting but places a tracking device on his car, leading Bourne to the Treadstone safe house in Paris. He breaks in and holds Conklin and logistics technician Nicky Parsons at gunpoint. Conklin reveals his association with Treadstone and presses him to remember his past. Bourne recalls his attempt to assassinate Wombosi through successive flashbacks.

Under orders from Treadstone, Bourne had infiltrated Wombosi's yacht and got close enough to assassinate him and make it appear as if he had been murdered by a member of his own entourage. However, Bourne could not kill Wombosi while his children were present. Believing he would have to kill the children, too, he instead fled, was shot during his escape, and lost his memory.

Bourne announces he is resigning from Treadstone and warns Conklin not to follow him. As agents descend on the safe house, he fights his way out. As Conklin leaves, he is killed by Manheim under Abbott's orders. Abbott later shuts down Treadstone using Conklin's right hand Danny Zorn. Both of them report to an oversight committee that Treadstone is a "decommissioned" former program of theoretical game-scenario exercises before diverting the discussion to a new project codenamed "Blackbriar". Bourne reunites with Marie in Mykonos.

== Cast ==
- Matt Damon as Jason Bourne
- Franka Potente as Marie Kreutz
- Chris Cooper as Alexander Conklin
- Clive Owen as The Professor
- Brian Cox as Ward Abbott
- Adewale Akinnuoye-Agbaje as Wombosi
- Gabriel Mann as Zorn
- Walton Goggins and Josh Hamilton as CIA research techs

In addition, Julia Stiles appears as Nicolette (Nicky Parsons), in a role that would be elevated to main cast billing in three later films of the Bourne franchise. Other actors in the film include Orso Maria Guerrini as Giancarlo, Tim Dutton as Eamonn, Denis Braccini as Picot, Nicky Naudé as Castel, Russell Levy as Manheim, and Vincent Franklin as Rawlins.

== Production ==
=== Development ===
Attempts to develop a film adaptation of The Bourne Identity began in 1981, when film producer Anthony Lazzarino and Ludlum's literary agent Henry Morrison's company Windwood/Glen Productions purchased the film rights to the novel shortly after its publication. Morrison left the company shortly afterwards, and Lazzarino optioned the film to Orion Pictures in exchange for a 3.75 percent interest and a presentation credit. This option was eventually acquired by Warner Bros. Pictures, which intended to make a film adaptation directed by Jack Clayton and starring Burt Reynolds. However, the film did not move forward because Reynolds was uninterested. Warner Bros. produced a television adaptation of the novel for ABC in 1988, but otherwise did nothing with its option and allowed the rights to revert to the Ludlum estate in 1999.

Director Doug Liman had been a fan of the source novel by Robert Ludlum since he read it in high school. Near the end of production of Liman's previous film Swingers in 1996, Liman decided to develop a film adaptation of the novel. However, he could not initially move forward with the project because Warner Bros. still owned the film rights. After more than two years of securing rights to the book and a further year of screenplay development with screenwriter Tony Gilroy, the film went through two years of production. Universal Pictures acquired the film rights to Ludlum's books in the hopes of starting a new film franchise, and because studio CEO Stacey Snider later admitted to being "intrigued by the pairing of an independent-minded filmmaker with a familiar studio genre." Ludlum approved of the adaptation after befriending Liman, who repeatedly visited the author's home to consult him.

=== Writing ===
David Self was brought in to write the screenplay in 1999 after Gilroy initially declined the offer. His screenplay was more faithful to the original novel. Unlike Liman, Gilroy disliked Ludlum's novels and considered them poorly suited to a film adaptation, calling Self's original script "a huge fifteen-gunmen-on-the-Metro-blowing-the-fuck-out-of-everything kind of movie." However, Gilroy agreed to write a new screenplay for the film after Liman took his advice to abandon everything from the original novel except for the basic plot involving "a guy who finds the only thing he knows how to do is kill people." Gilroy subsequently rewrote almost the entire film, although William Blake Herron was later brought in to rewrite Gilroy's script to have more action. Most of Herron's rewrites were abandoned after Matt Damon threatened to quit the role of Bourne if they were included in support of Liman and Gilroy, but Herron still received a writer's credit after the opening scene he composed for the film was included.

Gilroy's new script rewrote the Treadstone program and its director Alexander Conklin into the film's primary antagonists; in the novel both they and Bourne had been pursuing the terrorist "Carlos the Jackal" and Treadstone had only tried to assassinate Bourne because they believed he had deliberately gone rogue from his mission after his amnesia. "Carlos the Jackal" could not appear as an antagonist in the film at all because in real life he had been captured and imprisoned by the French government in 1994. The film's portrayal of Treadstone was inspired by Liman's father Arthur L. Liman's memoirs regarding his involvement as chief counsel for the United States Senate investigation of the Iran–Contra affair. Many aspects of the Alexander Conklin character were based on his father's recollections of Oliver North. Gilroy also abandoned the novel's original backstory for Bourne as a former Foreign Service officer recruited to the United States Army Special Forces during the Vietnam War after his family had been killed in the secret bombing of Cambodia and posing as an assassin named "Cain" to lure "Carlos" out of hiding. Liman admitted that he jettisoned much of the content of the novel beyond the central premise, in order to modernize the material and to conform it to his own beliefs regarding United States foreign policy. However, Liman was careful not to cram his political views down "the audience's throat".

There were initial concerns regarding the film's possible obsolescence and overall reception in the aftermath of the September 11 attacks. As a result, producer Frank Marshall reshot a new ending in which Ward Abbott offers to recruit Bourne back to the CIA and abandons the agency's pursuit of him even after he declines. The ending was not included in the theatrical cut because it was deemed too different from the rest of the film.

=== Casting ===
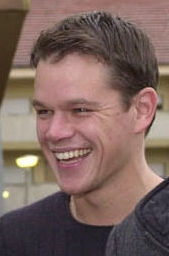
Damon in 2001

While Damon was Universal's top choice for the role of Bourne, Liman approached a wide range of actors for the role, including Brad Pitt, who turned it down to star in Spy Game, as well as Russell Crowe, Arnold Schwarzenegger, Tom Cruise and Sylvester Stallone, before he eventually cast Damon. Liman found that Damon understood and appreciated that, though The Bourne Identity would have its share of action, the focus was primarily on character and plot. Damon, who had never played such a physically demanding role, insisted on performing many of the stunts himself. With stunt choreographer Nick Powell, he underwent three months of extensive training in stunt work, the use of weapons, boxing, and the Filipino martial art eskrima. He eventually performed a significant number of the film's stunts himself, including hand-to-hand combat and scaling the exterior wall of the safe house near the film's conclusion.

Liman initially intended to cast Sarah Polley in the role of Marie, but she declined. After Franka Potente was cast instead, the role was rewritten from a Canadian economist to a German drifter.

=== Filming ===
Filming began in October 2000. From the onset of filming, difficulties with the studio slowed the film's development and caused a rift between Liman, Gilroy, and Universal Pictures. The first problems started after Liman and Damon demanded the abandonment of Herron's re-written script shortly before production started despite the fact that extensive preparations had already been made to film it. Liman also insisted on shooting the film on location in Paris rather than the cheaper option of Montreal, despite the fact that this meant the film's French-speaking crew was unable to understand the English-speaking cast and director. Executives were unhappy with the film's pacing, emphasis on small-scale action sequences, and the general relationship between themselves and Liman, who was suspicious of direct studio involvement. The film's original producer Richard N. Gladstein also quit the film at the beginning of production due to his wife's pregnancy, resulting in delays until he was replaced by Frank Marshall.

Liman demanded a number of reshoots and rewrites late in development and throughout production, sometimes in the middle of a shoot. This resulted in scheduling problems which delayed the film from its original release target date of September 2001 to June 2002 and took it $8,000,000 over budget from the initial budget of $60 million; Gilroy faxed elements of screenplay rewrites almost throughout the entire duration of filming. Particular points of contention with regard to the original Gilroy script were the scenes set in the farmhouse near the film's conclusion. Liman and Matt Damon fought to keep the scenes in the film after they were excised in a third-act rewrite that was insisted upon by the studio. Liman and Damon argued that, though the scenes were low key, they were integral to the audience's understanding of the Bourne character and the film's central themes. The farmhouse sequence consequently went through many rewrites from its original incarnation before its inclusion in the final product. Although Marshall ultimately sided with Liman to get the farmhouse sequence filmed, they got into an intense fight on set after Liman abruptly insisted on another reshoot to record a shot he had forgotten to include.

Other issues included poor test audience reactions to the film's Paris finale. The latter required a late return to location in order to shoot a new, more action-oriented conclusion to the Paris story arc involving a large explosion. This ending was also cut after the studio and Marshall decided that the film could not include an explosion after 9/11. In addition to Paris, filming took place in Prague, Imperia, Rome, Mykonos, and Zürich; several scenes set in Zürich were also filmed in Prague. Damon described the production as a struggle, citing the early conflicts that he and Liman had with the studio, but denied that it was an overly difficult process, stating, "When I hear people saying that the production was a nightmare it's like, a 'nightmare'? Shooting's always hard, but we finished."

Liman's directorial method was often hands-on. Many times he operated the camera himself in order to create what he believed was a more intimate relationship between himself, the material, and the actors. He felt that this connection was lost if he simply observed the recording on a monitor. This was a mindset he developed from his background as a small-scale indie film maker.

The acclaimed car chase sequence was filmed primarily by the second unit under director Alexander Witt. The unit shot in various locations around Paris while Liman was filming the main story arc elsewhere in the city. The finished footage was eventually edited together to create the illusion of a coherent journey. Liman confessed that "anyone who really knows Paris will find it illogical", since few of the locations used in the car chase actually connect to each other. Liman took only a few of the shots himself; his most notable chase sequence shots were those of Matt Damon and Franka Potente while inside the car.

The consulate scenes were filmed in 2001 with real U.S. Marine Security Guards playing the roles of consulate guards.

== Reception ==
=== Box office ===
The Bourne Identity grossed $121.5 million domestically (United States and Canada) and $92.9 million in other territories, for a worldwide total of $214.4 million, against a budget of $60 million. Going into general release on June 14, 2002, it opened at No. 2 behind Scooby-Doo. It spent its first five weeks in the Top 10 at the domestic box office.

=== Critical response ===
On the review aggregator website Rotten Tomatoes, 84% of 193 critics' reviews are positive, with an average rating of 7.0/10. The website's consensus reads: "Expertly blending genre formula with bursts of unexpected wit, The Bourne Identity is an action thriller that delivers – and then some." Metacritic, which uses a weighted average, assigned the film a score of 68 out of 100, based on 38 critics, indicating "generally favorable" reviews. Audiences polled by CinemaScore gave the film an average grade of "A−" on an A+ to F scale.

Roger Ebert of the Chicago Sun-Times gave the film three out of four stars and praised it for its ability to absorb the viewer in its "spycraft" and "Damon's ability to be focused and sincere" concluding that the film was "unnecessary, but not unskilled". A review by Film Freak Central, of the 2003 DVD release, praised the film for its pacing and action sequences, noting its "subversion of the conventions of the thriller genre". Charles Taylor of Salon.com acclaimed the film as "entertaining, handsome and gripping... an anomaly among big-budget summer blockbusters: a thriller with some brains and feeling behind it, more attuned to story and character than to spectacle", without sliding into "cynicism or hopelessness".

Ed Gonzalez of Slant Magazine also described Doug Liman's "restrained approach to the material" as well as Matt Damon and Franka Potente's strong chemistry, but ultimately concluded the film was "smart, but not smart enough". J. Hoberman of The Village Voice dismissed the film as "banal" and as a disappointment compared against Liman's previous indie releases; Owen Gleiberman also criticised the film for a "sullen roteness that all of Liman's supple handheld staging can't disguise". Aaron Beierle of DVDTalk gave particular praise to the film's central car chase which was described as an exciting action highlight and one of the best realized in the genre.

The Bourne Identity has been described by some authors as a neo-noir film.

In 2025, it was one of the films voted for the "Readers' Choice" edition of The New York Times' list of "The 100 Best Movies of the 21st Century," finishing at number 237. In a retrospective, Noah Gittell of The Guardian considered it one of the most influential action films of all time.

=== Accolades ===
Year	Organization	Award	Category/Recipient	Result
2003	ASCAP Film and Television Music Awards	ASCAP Award	Top Box Office Films – John Powell	Won
2003	Academy of Science Fiction, Fantasy & Horror Films, USA	Saturn Award	Best Action/Adventure/Thriller Film	Nominated
2003	American Choreography Awards	American Choreography Award	Outstanding Achievement in Fight Choreography – Nick Powell	Won
2003	Art Directors Guild	Excellence in Production Design Award	Feature Film – Contemporary Films	Nominated
2003	Motion Picture Sound Editors, USA	Golden Reel Award	Best Sound Editing in Domestic Features – Dialogue & ADR; Sound Effects & Foley	Nominated
2003	World Stunt Awards	Taurus Award	Best Work With a Vehicle	Won

== Home media ==
On January 21, 2003, Universal Pictures released The Bourne Identity in the U.S. on VHS, as well as on a "Collector's Edition" DVD in two formats: widescreen and full screen. It surpassed Harry Potter and the Sorcerer's Stone to have the highest DVD rentals, making $22.7 million. The film would hold this record for seven months until it was taken by The Lord of the Rings: The Two Towers in August of the same year. This DVD release contains supplemental materials including a making-of documentary, a commentary from director Doug Liman and deleted scenes. On July 13, 2004, Universal released a new "extended edition" DVD of the film in the U.S. in preparation for the sequel's cinema debut. This DVD came in the same two formats as the 2003 edition. The supplemental materials for this version include interviews with Matt Damon, deleted scenes, alternative opening and ending, a documentary on the consulate fight and information features on the CIA and amnesia. The alternate ending on the DVD has Bourne collapsing during the search for Marie, waking up with Abbott standing over him, and getting an offer to return to the CIA. Neither contain the commentary or DTS tracks present in the 2003 edition. The film was also released on UMD for Sony's PlayStation Portable on August 30, 2005, and on HD DVD on July 24, 2007. With the release of The Bourne Ultimatum on DVD, a reprint of the 2004 version was included in a boxed set with Supremacy and Ultimatum, entitled The Jason Bourne Collection. A trilogy set was released on Blu-ray in January 2009.

It was the top DVD video rental in the United States during the first quarter of 2003, earning $36,400,000 (equivalent to $64,000,000 in 2025) in US DVD rental revenue by March 2003.

== Soundtrack ==
The score for The Bourne Identity was composed by John Powell, conducted by Pete Anthony and performed by the Hollywood Studio Symphony. Powell was brought in to replace Carter Burwell, who had composed and recorded a more traditional orchestral score for the film, which director Doug Liman rejected. Since a lot of the music budget had been spent recording the rejected score, Powell's score was initially conceived to be entirely non-orchestral, making extensive use of percussion, guitars, electronics and studio techniques. However, a string section was later overdubbed onto many of the cues to give them a 'cinematic' quality.

The Bourne Identity: Original Motion Picture Soundtrack was released on June 11, 2002, by Varèse Sarabande. In addition to the score, the film also featured the songs "Extreme Ways" by Moby and "Ready Steady Go" by Paul Oakenfold. The soundtrack won an ASCAP Award.

== Sequels ==
The Bourne Identity was followed by a 2004 sequel, The Bourne Supremacy, which received a similar positive critical and public reception, but received some criticism for its hand-held camerawork, which observers argued made action sequences difficult to see. The Bourne Supremacy was directed by Paul Greengrass with Matt Damon reprising his role as Jason Bourne. A third film, The Bourne Ultimatum, was released in 2007 and again was directed by Paul Greengrass and starred Matt Damon. Like Supremacy, Ultimatum received generally positive critical and public reception, but also received similar criticism for the camera-work. Liman remained as executive producer for both films as well as for the fifth film Jason Bourne, once again directed by Greengrass and released in 2016.

The fourth film of the Bourne franchise, The Bourne Legacy was released in 2012. Neither Damon nor Greengrass was involved.

Damon and Paul Greengrass returned in 2016 for the fifth installment of the series Jason Bourne, directed by Greengrass and written by Greengrass and Christopher Rouse. It is the final film in the Bourne film series and a direct sequel to The Bourne Ultimatum (2007).

== See also ==
- List of films featuring surveillance
