= Omar Metwally =

American actor (born 1974)

- Born: Queens, New York, U.S.
- Education: University of California, Berkeley (BA); American Conservatory Theater (MFA)
- Occupation: Actor
- Years active: 1999–present

Omar Metwally is an American actor. He is known for his portrayal of Dr. Vik Ullah in the Showtime drama series The Affair, as well as for the films Munich (2005), Rendition (2007), and Miral (2010). He has also appeared in the roles of Dr. Fahim Nasir in Non-Stop (2014), Ernesto Santiago in the USA drama series Mr. Robot, Matt Edwards in the Bourne spin-off television series Treadstone, Mark Lindor in the ABC drama series Big Sky, and Dr. Michael Hamda in the FOX drama series Doc.

== Early life ==
Metwally was born in Queens, New York, to an Egyptian father and a Dutch mother and moved with the family to Orange County, California, at age three, where he was raised. Metwally earned a BA in history from the University of California, Berkeley, and while acting around the Bay Area earned a Master of Fine Arts in acting from the American Conservatory Theater, San Francisco.

== Career ==
Metwally's film roles include Steven Spielberg's Munich, Gavin Hood's Rendition, James Ivory's The City of Your Final Destination, Julian Schnabel's Miral, and Jaume Collet-Serra's Non-Stop.

Metwally has worked extensively on stage, appearing in Richard Kalinoski's Beast on the Moon, Eliam Kraiem's Sixteen Wounded, and Rajiv Joseph's Guards at the Taj. He worked with the New York Arab-American Comedy Festival, first as an actor and then as a director. He has also appeared at theaters around the country, including Steppenwolf, The Public, Long Wharf, and Berkeley Rep.

Metwally's television credits include The Affair, Mr. Robot, Treadstone, Big Sky, and Doc.

== Filmography ==
=== Film ===
Year	Title	Role	Notes
2005	Life on the Ledge	Druggist	
2005	Munich	Ali	
2006	Twenty Questions	Mr. Assad	
2007	Rendition	Anwar El-Ibrahimi	
2009	The City of Your Final Destination	Omar Razaghi	
2009	Amsterdam	John	
2010	Miral	Hani	
2012	The Twilight Saga: Breaking Dawn – Part 2	Amun	
2014	Non-Stop	Dr. Fahim Nasir	
2014	Day Ten	William	Short film
2016	Complete Unknown	Farshad	
2017	Breakable You	Samir Kamali	

=== Television ===
Year	Title	Role	Notes
1999	Nash Bridges	Mobster #3	Episode: "Power Play"
2002	New Americans	Anwar Beshrabi	Television film
2006	Grey's Anatomy	Jesse Fannon	Episode: "Superstition"
2006	The Unit	Wirth	Episode: "Dedication"
2008	Discovery Atlas	Narrator	Episode: "Egypt Revealed"
2009	Virtuality	Dr. Adin Meyer	Television film
2010	Fringe	James Heath	2 episodes
2011	The Good Wife	Wasim Al-Said	Episode: "A New Day"
2011	Unforgettable	ADA Adam Gilroy	2 episodes
2011–2012	Harry's Law	ADA Hayden Kildare	3 episodes
2015	Dig	Yussef Khalid	6 episodes
2015	The Slap	Ajay	Episode: "Aisha"
2015–2019	The Affair	Dr. Vik Ullah	27 episodes
2016–2017	Mr. Robot	Ernesto Santiago	13 episodes
2019	Treadstone	Matt Edwards	10 episodes
2020	Ramy	Bin Khalid	Episode: "Miakhalifa.mov"
2021	Big Sky	US Marshal Mark Lindor	15 episodes
2021	Lisey's Story	Dr. Hugh Alberness	4 episodes
2025–present	Doc	Dr. Michael Hamda	Main cast

== Theater ==
Year	Title	Role	Venue
2004	Sixteen Wounded	Mahmoud	Walter Kerr Theatre
2005	Beast on the Moon	Aram	Century Center for the Performing Arts
2012	As You Like It	Oliver	Delacorte Theater
2015	Guards at the Taj	Humayun	Linda Gross Theater
2017	How to Transcend a Happy Marriage	Paul	Mitzi E. Newhouse Theater
2022	Epiphany	Sam	Mitzi E. Newhouse Theater

== Awards and nominations ==
Year	Awards	Category	Nominated work	Result	Ref.
2004	Tony Awards	Best Featured Actor in a Play	Sixteen Wounded	Nominated	
2008	Trophée Chopard	Male Revelation of the Year	Rendition	Won	
2016	Obie Awards	Outstanding Performance	Guards at the Taj	Won	
