= Oliver Wood (cinematographer) =

British cinematographer (1942–2023)

- Born: 21 February 1942; London, England
- Died: 13 February 2023 (aged 80); Los Angeles, California, U.S.
- Occupation: Cinematographer
- Years active: 1968–2022
- Spouse(s): Jane Forth; Sabina Groh
- Children: 3

Oliver Wood (21 February 1942 – 13 February 2023) was an English cinematographer, best known for his work in American films, mostly in the action, thriller and comedy genres.

He was nominated for a BAFTA Award for Best Cinematography for The Bourne Ultimatum.

== Early life ==
Wood was born in London on 21 February 1942. One of his early jobs in the film industry was as an assistant to director John Boorman, while he was head of the BBC's documentary department.

Wood shot the (now partially-lost) 1967 short film Popdown in London, and Rene Daalder's 1969 film The White Slave, and was a camera assistant for the Michael Winner-directed music hall documentary A Little of What You Fancy in 1968. In the late 1960s, Wood moved to New York City.

He cited French New Wave cinematographer Raoul Coutard as one of his strongest influences.

== Career ==
His first break in the US came when he was hired by director Leonard Kastle to shoot The Honeymoon Killers, a low-budget film based on the real-life serial killer couple Raymond Fernandez and Martha Beck, "the Lonely Hearts Killers." He utilized high-contrast black-and-white film stock and natural lighting to give the dark comedy a cinéma vérité-inspired pseudo-documentary look. The film is now considered a cult classic, and Wood's photography was noted at the time.

He shot numerous B-movies and independent films throughout the late 1970s and 1980s, frequently collaborating with cinematographers Joseph Mangine and Fred Murphy. He also worked as a camera operator on higher-profile projects including Body Rock (1984) and To Live and Die in L.A. (1985), both of which were shot by Robby Müller. He also became a music video and commercial cinematographer, working for directors like Bob Giraldi and Rupert Wainwright.

His big break came when he was director of photography for 53 episodes of the crime drama Miami Vice, serving as the series primary DP between 1987 and 1989. His work on the series caught the attention of producers, enabling him to work on big-budget Hollywood films including Die Hard 2 (1990), Face/Off (1997), U-571 (2000) Fantastic Four (2005), and Anchorman 2: The Legend Continues (2013).

He was the original director of photography on the swashbuckling action film Cutthroat Island, but suffered an on-set injury and was replaced by Peter Levy.

He shot the Bourne Trilogy, where he worked with director Paul Greengrass on Supremacy and Ultimatum, producing a spontaneous, naturalistic effect, often using multiple cameras, frequently handheld, citing films such as The Battle of Algiers as an influence. He was nominated for a BAFTA for The Bourne Ultimatum (2007).

In 2016, Wood shot the remake of Ben-Hur, directed by Timur Bekmambetov, utilizing GoPro cameras to film the movie's action sequences.

== Personal life and death ==
Wood married twice, once to Jane Forth. He had two daughters, and a son.

Wood died from cancer at his home in Los Angeles, California on 13 February 2023 at the age of 80.

== Filmography ==
=== Film ===
Year	Title	Director	Notes
1969	Popdown	Fred Marshall	
1969	De blanke slavin	Rene Daalder	With Jan de Bont
1970	The Honeymoon Killers	Leonard Kastle	
1977	Danny	Gene Feldman	
1978	Feedback	Bill Doukas	
1979	Don't Go in the House	Joseph Ellison	
1982	Maya	Ágúst Ágústsson	
1983	The Returning	Josh Bender	
1983	The Sex O'Clock News	Romano Vanderbes	
1984	In Our Words	Robert Richter; Stanley Warnow	Documentary film
1984	Alphabet City	Amos Poe	
1986	Joey	Joseph Ellison	
1986	Quiet Cool	Clay Borris	With Jacques Haitkin
1986	Neon Maniacs	Joseph Mangine	With Joseph Mangine
1990	Die Hard 2	Renny Harlin	
1990	The Adventures of Ford Fairlane	Renny Harlin	
1991	Mystery Date	Jonathan Wacks	
1991	Bill & Ted's Bogus Journey	Peter Hewitt	
1993	For Love or Money	Barry Sonnenfeld	
1993	Rudy	David Anspaugh	
1993	Sister Act 2: Back in the Habit	Bill Duke	
1994	Terminal Velocity	Deran Sarafian	
1995	Mr. Holland's Opus	Stephen Herek	
1996	Celtic Pride	Tom DeCerchio	
1996	2 Days in the Valley	John Herzfeld	
1997	Face/Off	John Woo	
1997	Switchback	Jeb Stuart	
1998	Mighty Joe Young	Ron Underwood	With Donald Peterman
2000	U-571	Jonathan Mostow	
2002	The Adventures of Pluto Nash	Ron Underwood	
2002	I Spy	Betty Thomas	
2002	The Bourne Identity	Doug Liman	
2003	National Security	Dennis Dugan	
2003	Freaky Friday	Mark Waters	
2004	Scooby-Doo 2: Monsters Unleashed	Raja Gosnell	
2004	The Bourne Supremacy	Paul Greengrass	
2005	Fantastic Four	Tim Story	
2006	Talladega Nights: The Ballad of Ricky Bobby	Adam McKay	
2007	The Bourne Ultimatum	Paul Greengrass	Nominated - BAFTA Award for Best Cinematography
2008	Step Brothers	Adam McKay	
2009	Surrogates	Jonathan Mostow	
2010	The Other Guys	Adam McKay	
2012	Safe House	Daniel Espinosa	
2013	2 Guns	Baltasar Kormákur	
2013	Anchorman 2: The Legend Continues	Adam McKay	
2015	Child 44	Daniel Espinosa	
2016	Grimsby	Louis Leterrier	
2016	Ben-Hur	Timur Bekmambetov	
2016	Jack Reacher: Never Go Back	Edward Zwick	
2018	The Equalizer 2	Antoine Fuqua	
2018	Holmes & Watson	Etan Cohen	
2022	Morbius	Daniel Espinosa	

=== Television ===
TV movies

Year	Title	Director
1985	City Boy	Bob Giraldi
1987	Nasty Hero	Nick Barwood
1991	Angel City	Renny Harlin

TV series

Year	Title	Director	Notes
1987–89	Miami Vice		53 episodes
2020	Cine Chalom	Yossi Benavraham	Episode "EXTRAIT DU FILM "VOLTE FACE" DE JOHN WOO... 1997"
