= A Texas Funeral =

- Directed by: William Blake Herron
- Written by: William Blake Herron
- Produced by: Graham Broadbent; Damian Jones
- Starring: Quinton Jones; Robert Patrick; Martin Sheen; Olivia d'Abo
- Cinematography: Mike Bonvillain
- Edited by: Paul Trejo
- Music by: James Legg
- Production companies: Dragon Pictures; T.F. Productions Inc.
- Distributed by: New City Releasing
- Release date: September 7, 1999 (Venice)
- Running time: 98 minutes
- Country: United States
- Language: English

A Texas Funeral is a 1999 American fantasy comedy-drama film written and directed by William Blake Herron and starring Robert Patrick, Jane Adams and Martin Sheen.

== Cast ==
- Quinton Jones as "Little Sparta"
- Robert Patrick as Zach
- Jane Adams as Mary Joan
- Martin Sheen as Grandpa Sparta
- Chris Noth as Clinton
- Olivia d'Abo as Charlotte
- Grace Zabriskie as Murtis
- Joanne Whalley as Miranda
- Isaiah Washington as Walter
