= Jason Bourne (film) =

2016 American action film by Paul Greengrass

- Theatrical release poster
- Directed by: Paul Greengrass
- Written by: Paul Greengrass; Christopher Rouse
- Based on: Characters by Robert Ludlum
- Produced by: Frank Marshall; Jeffrey M. Weiner; Ben Smith; Matt Damon; Paul Greengrass; Gregory Goodman
- Starring: Matt Damon; Tommy Lee Jones; Alicia Vikander; Vincent Cassel; Julia Stiles; Riz Ahmed
- Cinematography: Barry Ackroyd
- Edited by: Christopher Rouse
- Music by: John Powell; David Buckley
- Production companies: Universal Pictures; The Kennedy/Marshall Company; Captivate Entertainment; Pearl Street
- Distributed by: Universal Pictures
- Release dates: July 11, 2016 (Odeon Leicester Square); July 29, 2016 (United States)
- Running time: 123 minutes
- Country: United States
- Language: English
- Budget: $120 million
- Box office: $416.2 million

Jason Bourne is a 2016 American action thriller film co-produced and directed by Paul Greengrass, who co-wrote the script with Christopher Rouse. It is the fifth installment of the Bourne film series and a direct sequel to The Bourne Ultimatum (2007). Matt Damon reprises his role as the main character, former CIA assassin Jason Bourne, in addition to co-producing the film. In addition, the film stars Tommy Lee Jones, Alicia Vikander, Vincent Cassel, Riz Ahmed, Ato Essandoh, Scott Shepherd, and Julia Stiles who also reprises her role as Nicky Parsons. The film takes place twelve years after the events of Ultimatum and follows Bourne who remains on the run from CIA hit squads as he tries to uncover hidden truths about his father, while CIA director Robert Dewey (Jones) orders the head of cyber-security, Heather Lee (Vikander), to hunt him down.

Plans for a direct sequel to The Bourne Legacy (2012) starring Jeremy Renner were put on hold in favor of an official sequel to Ultimatum featuring the return of Damon as actor (and also producer) and Greengrass as director. Principal photography on the film commenced on September 8, 2015.

Jason Bourne premiered in London on July 11, 2016, and was theatrically released in the United States by Universal Pictures on July 29. The film received mixed reviews and was a box office success, grossing $416 million against a $120 million budget.

== Plot ==
Twelve years after exposing Blackbriar, (Note: As depicted in The Bourne Ultimatum (2007)) ex-CIA agent and Treadstone operative Jason Bourne is still tormented by flashbacks. He isolated himself from the world, making a living as a street fighter in Greece.

Meanwhile, in Reykjavík, former Treadstone technician Nicky Parsons, who has been collaborating with a hacktivist group led by Christian Dassault, hacks into the CIA's server to expose its black ops programs. She finds documents detailing Bourne's recruitment into Treadstone and his father's role in it; she travels to Athens to inform him.

Parsons' breach alerts Heather Lee, the CIA's cybersecurity operations division head, and CIA Director Robert Dewey. They send teams after Bourne and Parsons; Dewey also sends CIA assassin "The Asset", who was captured and tortured in Syria as an unintentional consequence of Bourne's exposure of Blackbriar.

Bourne and Parsons agree to meet at Syntagma Square in Athens during an anti-government protest. Bourne realizes the CIA is looking for both of them, so he fights off agents to keep them away from her. While he tries to keep her safe, Parsons is soon fatally shot by The Asset. Before dying, she gives Bourne the key to a locker holding the stolen CIA files.

Bourne, who wants answers about his past and family, locates and meets with Dassault in Berlin, who decrypts the files. Bourne discovers his father Richard Webb was a CIA analyst involved in the creation of Treadstone. Malware implanted in the files allows the CIA to locate him while Lee remotely erases them. Dassault attacks, but is ultimately incapacitated by Bourne.

Lee secretly alerts Bourne to the CIA team closing in. After seeing his behavior report, she believes he can be persuaded to return to the agency. Bourne avoids the team, then tracks down ex-Treadstone operative Malcolm Smith in London, arranging to meet him in Paddington Plaza.

Meanwhile, Lee persuades Dewey's boss, Director of National Intelligence Edwin Russell, to let her contact Bourne in person to try to bring Bourne back in. Dewey, who opposes her plan, secretly instructs The Asset to eliminate Lee's team and him.

Bourne confronts Smith, who admits Webb helped create Treadstone. After Dewey sent agents to recruit Webb's son, David (i.e., Bourne), Webb threatened to expose the program to prevent him from becoming a CIA assassin. The Asset killed Webb under Dewey's orders in Beirut by staging what appeared to be a terrorist attack, which helped the CIA push Bourne into joining Treadstone.

The Asset interrupts and kills Smith when Bourne uses him as a human shield. Bourne escapes, then later locates Lee, who tells him that, for different reasons, they both want Dewey gone. She then directs him to a convention in Las Vegas.

Dewey is scheduled to attend a public debate with Aaron Kalloor, the CEO of social media giant Deep Dream. Kalloor is the public face of corporate social responsibility in the Internet age, but was secretly funded by Dewey in the startup stage.

Dewey intends to use Deep Dream for real-time mass surveillance alongside the latest incarnation of the CIA's targeted assassination "Beta" program, a more ruthless version of Blackbriar, in which the assassin can murder anyone to get to the target. However, Kalloor decides against giving the CIA access to Deep Dream. Dewey authorizes The Asset to assassinate both Kalloor and Lee after discovering that she is helping Bourne.

Bourne thwarts the assassinations, then fights through several CIA agents before eventually confronting Dewey in his suite. Dewey attempts to stage an ambush, but is killed by Lee. Bourne agrees to cover up her involvement, then pursues The Asset. They crash into the Riviera casino, eventually finding their way into the sewers, where their fight ends with Bourne killing The Asset.

Some time later, Lee volunteers herself to Russell as the new CIA director. She outlines her plan to bring Bourne back to the agency, noting that she is prepared to kill him if he refuses. Lee then meets face-to-face with Bourne, who says he will consider the offer. She returns to her car to find a tape of her conversation with Russell — Bourne had followed Lee and was aware of her true intentions during the face-to-face meeting. Then, Bourne disappears again.

== Cast ==
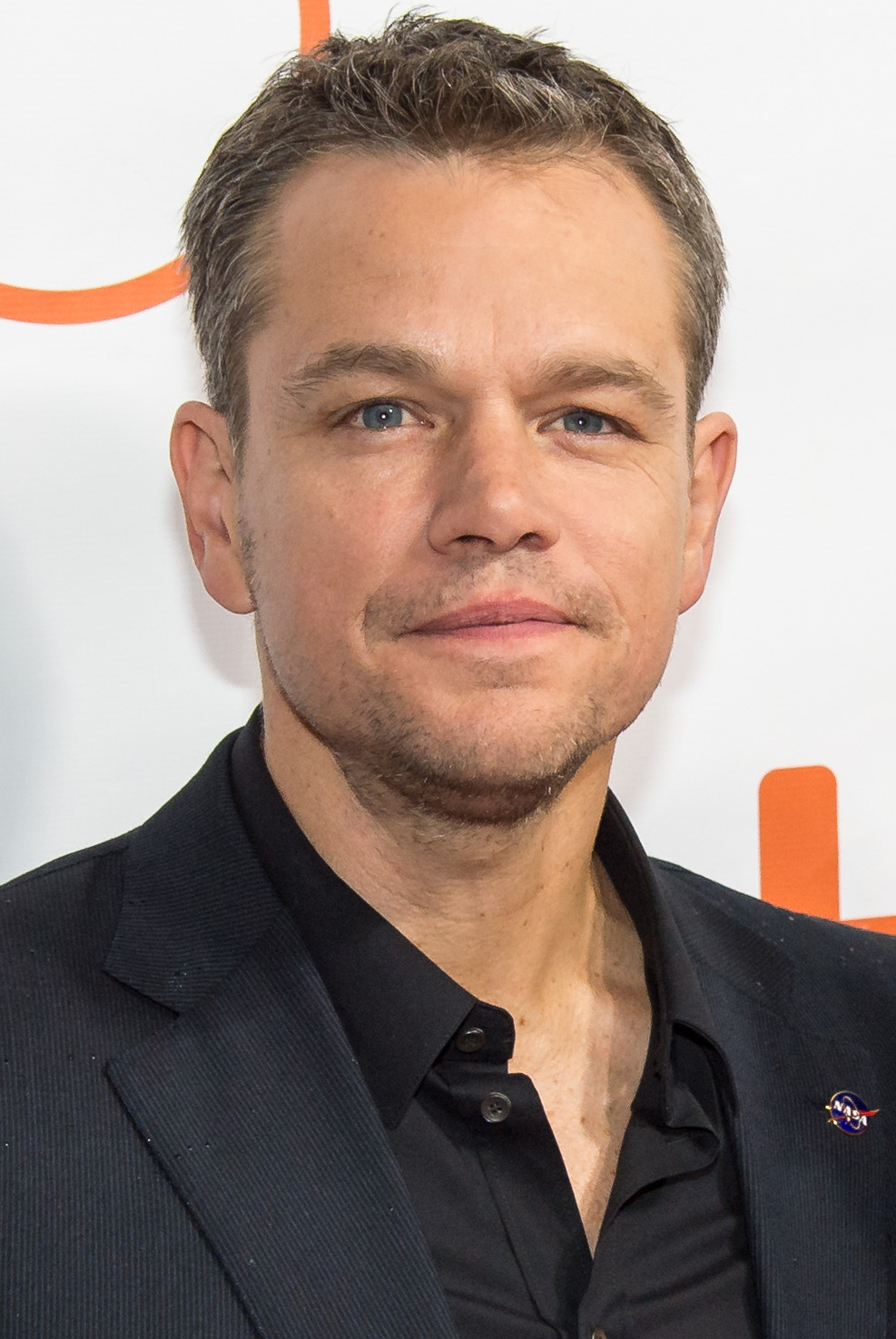
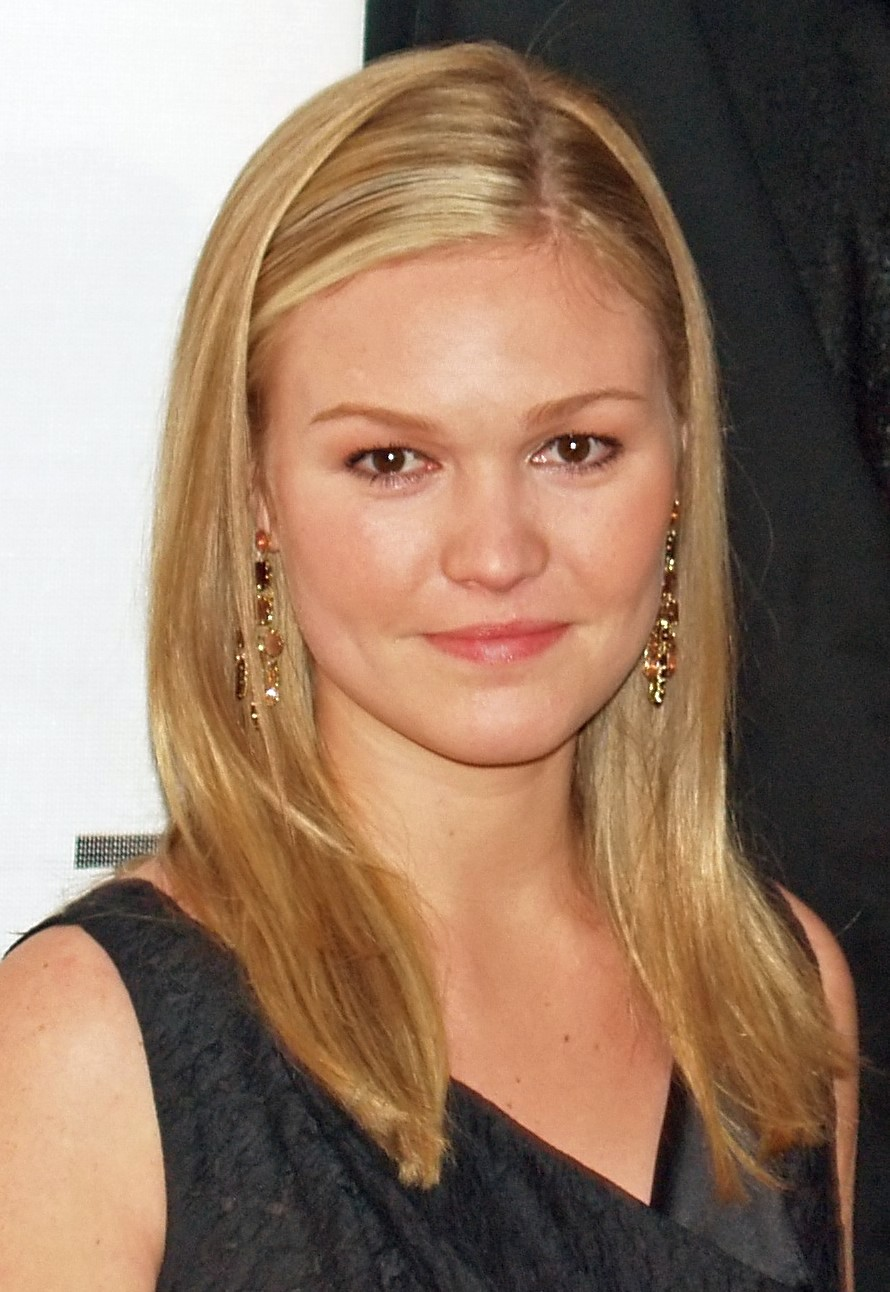
Matt Damon and Julia Stiles reprised their roles from the original trilogy of films.
- Matt Damon as Jason Bourne, former assassin in the CIA's Operation Treadstone
- Tommy Lee Jones as CIA Director Robert Dewey
- Alicia Vikander as Heather Lee, head of the CIA Cyber Ops Division
- Vincent Cassel as the "Asset", a CIA assassin in Operation Blackbriar
- Julia Stiles as Nicky Parsons, former CIA agent
- Riz Ahmed as Aaron Kalloor, CEO of Deep Dream
- Ato Essandoh as Craig Jeffers, CIA agent and Dewey's right-hand man
- Scott Shepherd as Director NI Edwin Russell
- Bill Camp as Malcolm Smith, former CIA analyst
- Vinzenz Kiefer as Christian Dassault, leader of a group of privacy activists
- Stephen Kunken as Baumen, Kalloor's assistant
- Gregg Henry as Richard Webb, Jason Bourne's father and creator of the Treadstone program

== Production ==
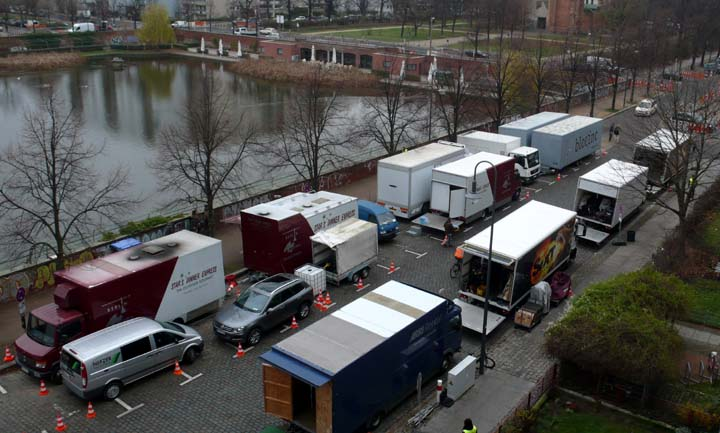
Film production in Berlin

=== Development ===
In May 2007, prior to the release of The Bourne Ultimatum, Matt Damon stated that he would not be interested in returning for a fourth Bourne film, remarking of his participation in the Bourne franchise: "We have ridden that horse as far as we can." Damon said in August 2007:

I think in terms of another one, the story of this guy's search for his identity is over, because he's got all the answers, so there's no way we can trot out the same character, and so much of what makes him interesting is that internal struggle that was happening for him: am I a good guy, am I a bad guy, what is the secret behind my identity, what am I blocking out, why am I remembering these disturbing images? So all of that internal propulsive mechanism that drives the character is not there, so if there was to be another one, then it would have to be a complete reconfiguration, you know. Where do you go from there? For me, I kind of feel like the story that we set out to tell has now been told. I love the character, and if Paul Greengrass calls me in ten years and says, 'Now we can do it, because it's been ten years and I have a way to bring him back,' then there's a world in which I can go, 'Yeah, absolutely.' We could get the band back together if there was a great idea behind it, but in terms of now and this story, that part—-the story's been told ...

Instead The Bourne Legacy was released in the U.S. on August 10, 2012, with Jeremy Renner replacing Damon as the star. Despite receiving mixed reviews Universal noted that they planned to continue with the series, with Damon and Paul Greengrass later expressing interest in returning.

On September 15, 2014, it was announced that Damon and Greengrass would indeed return for the next Bourne film. In November 2014, Damon confirmed that he and Greengrass would return, with a script from themselves, with Christopher Rouse editing. On May 23, 2015, Deadline Hollywood reported that Alicia Vikander was in talks to star with Damon in the fifth film. On June 19, 2015, Deadline reported that Julia Stiles had confirmed she would be reprising the role of Nicky Parsons in the film, a character she had previously played in the first three films. Viggo Mortensen was in talks to play the villain role. On June 23, 2015, Vikander was confirmed to star in the sequel, while she was also in talks for the Assassin's Creed film, which she passed on. On July 28, 2015, Tommy Lee Jones joined the film's cast to play a senior CIA officer. On September 1, 2015, Vincent Cassel was cast in the film as an assassin who tracks Bourne. On September 15, 2015, The Hollywood Reporter confirmed that actor Ato Essandoh was cast in the film as an unspecified character. On October 20, 2015, Scott Shepherd was added to the cast to play the deputy director of the CIA. On November 4, 2015, Variety confirmed that Riz Ahmed had signed on to play the role of a tech specialist working with the CIA.

=== Filming ===
Principal photography on the film commenced on September 8, 2015. In late November 2015, filming took place in Kreuzberg, Berlin. In early December 2015, filming started in Washington, D.C., where shooting took place at Constitution Gardens. Filming in Las Vegas, Nevada was scheduled to begin on January 14, 2016, lasting until January 21. Filming also took place at stages F and H at Leavesden Studios. The Leavesden set was used as the CIA hub space in the film. Production on the film concluded on February 1, 2016.

=== Soundtrack ===
The soundtrack to Jason Bourne, as composed by John Powell and David Buckley, and additional music by Batu Sener, was released digitally on July 29, 2016, by Back Lot Music. A new version of Moby's "Extreme Ways", entitled "Extreme Ways (Jason Bourne)", was recorded for the film's end credits.

== Release ==
On January 6, 2015, Universal set the film's United States release date as July 29, 2016. The first trailer for the film aired on February 7, 2016, during Super Bowl 50 and revealed the title of the film. The film was released in the United Kingdom on July 27, 2016.

=== Home media ===
Jason Bourne was released on Digital HD and on Blu-ray/DVD December 6, 2016, by Universal Pictures Home Entertainment.

== Reception ==
=== Box office ===
Jason Bourne became a commercial success, with a modest budget compared to its final gross. The film grossed $162.2 million domestically, and $254 million in other territories, for a worldwide total of $416.2 million, against a budget of $120 million.

The film passed the $400 million threshold on October 7, making it the second film in the Bourne franchise to reach this milestone and the second-highest-grossing film in the series behind The Bourne Ultimatum. Worldwide, the film opened at number one in 50 markets, scoring the biggest debut in the franchise in 53 markets. In 51 territories, Jason Bourne is the highest-grossing film in the franchise. It is the third highest-grossing film of 2016 (behind Warcraft and The Mermaid) that is not about comic book superheroes nor anthropomorphic animals (including The Jungle Book).

==== United States and Canada ====
In the United States and Canada, Jason Bourne was projected to gross $50–60 million in its opening weekend. It made $4.2 million from Thursday night previews at 2,928 theaters which began at 7:00pm, becoming the first film in the series to earn above $1 million from previews, although the other four films' screenings began at midnight. On its opening day, it grossed $22.8 million, which is the second biggest opening day of the series behind The Bourne Ultimatum ($24.6 million). It topped the box office in its opening weekend as expected with a $59.2 million opening, making it one of the few franchise titles from 2016 to open on par with its predecessor. It is the second biggest opening for the franchise as well as for Damon, just behind the $69 million debut of The Bourne Ultimatum in 2007. The film dropped by 71% on its second Friday ($6.5 million) as a result of the release of the superhero film Suicide Squad, falling to No. 2 behind that film. By comparison, the last four Bourne movies all dropped (respectively) 46%, 59%, 57% and 61% on their second Fridays. It spent its first five weeks in the Top 10 at the domestic box office.

==== Other territories ====
Internationally, Jason Bourne is the highest-grossing film of the series and has secured a release in a total of 78 countries. The film opened day-and-date in conjuncture with its North American release across 46 territories, including Australia, Brazil, South Korea, and the U.K. and Ireland. It grossed $22.8 million on its opening day, marking the biggest international opening day for the franchise. It had No. 1 opening days in 28 markets and recorded the biggest opening day for the franchise in the United Kingdom and Ireland ($5.2 million). Through Sunday, July 31, it had an opening weekend total of $50.7 million easily topping the box office as well as debuting at first place in 27 of the 48 markets and scored the best international opening for the franchise. After three weeks of fluctuating up and down the charts, it rose back to the top spot in its fourth weekend after a strong debut in China.

It recorded the biggest opening for the franchise in South Korea ($11.3 million), the United Kingdom ($10.2 million), Australia ($5.8 million) Japan ($4.4 million) and Russia ($2.1 million) and had number one openings in France ($3.4 million), Australia, Taiwan ($2 million), Spain ($1.9 million), Indonesia ($1.7 million), the Philippines ($1.5 million) the Netherlands ($1.5 million), Mexico ($1.5 million), the UAE ($1.2 million), Sweden ($1.1 million) and Singapore ($1.1 million).

Brazil was one of the markets that did not open in first place, instead opening in fourth place with $1.4 million. South Korea posted the biggest opening among all other countries and although it faced stiff competition from local titles – Operation Chromite and Train to Busan – debuted in third place. Its opening figure is nevertheless a franchise milestone and comes ahead of competitions like Spectre and Furious 7. Similarly, in the United Kingdom and Ireland, it finished in second place after facing competition with the animated Finding Dory. It had a £7.6 million ($10 million) debut including £2.29 million ($3 million) worth of previews from 563 theaters, a new record for the franchise. However, based on pure Friday to Sunday earnings with the exclusion of previews, the film's £5.31 ($6.98 million) is more or less at par with The Bourne Ultimatum's £5.31 million ($7 million). In just 10 days, it became the second highest-grossing film in the series there. In India, it debuted in second place for a non-local film behind Suicide Squad with $1.1 million.

In China, the film was released on Tuesday, August 23, alongside the animated Ice Age: Collision Course and received an exclusive 3D version. It grossed an estimated $12.3 million on its opening day to record the franchise's best opening day there (other Chinese sources had it at $11.8 million). By comparison, The Bourne Legacy made $12.7 there in four days. In three days, it earned $25.1 million. In total, it delivered a six-day opening weekend total of an estimated $49.1 million – and a Friday to Sunday total of $23.9 million – to record the biggest opening for the franchise there. Its opening numbers alone surpassed the lifetime total of all other Jason Bourne films there. While it had a robust opening, compared to other Hollywood films that also opened on a Tuesday, such as Mission: Impossible – Rogue Nation (Friday +18%, Saturday +68%) and Avengers: Age of Ultron (Friday +37%, Saturday +88%), Jason Bourne's box office jumps on its first Friday and Saturday were just 13% and 43% respectively. Following a first-place finish, it fell precipitously by 92% in its second weekend, earning $3.8 million.

Following North America and China, the U.K. is the film's top earning international market with $30.4 million, followed by South Korea with $19.1 million and Australia with $16.7 million and France with $11.6 million.

=== Critical response ===
Review aggregation website Rotten Tomatoes gave the film an approval rating of 55% based on 326 reviews, with a weighted average score of 5.9/10. The website's critical consensus states, "Jason Bourne delivers fans of the franchise more of what they've come to expect – which is this sequel's biggest selling point as well as its greatest flaw." Metacritic gave the film a normalized score of 58 out of 100, based on 50 critics, indicating "mixed or average" reviews. Audiences polled by CinemaScore gave the film an average grade of "A−" on an A+ to F scale.

Mike Ryan of Uproxx gave the film a mixed review, writing: "Jason Bourne is a completely unnecessary sequel that barely moves along the plot from the third movie. And after what a Big Deal it was in The Bourne Legacy that no one could find Jason Bourne, it does feel a bit weird that the return of Jason Bourne seems so anticlimactic." Chris Tilly of IGN gave the film 7/10, saying: "Jason Bourne has a passable plot and a couple of pulsating sequences, which already makes it better than the majority of action movies. But in the context of its predecessors, that isn't good enough, the new movie never fully escaping the shadow of that previous trilogy, and making you question the wisdom of drawing Bourne back out of the shadows at all."

A. O. Scott of The New York Times described Damon's performance as being "as subdued as ever" and said: "[t]his is perhaps the most striking feature of Jason Bourne: Virtually all the major characters—good, bad and in-between—work for the same organization, at least on a consulting basis. There are dark whispers about external threats, and invocations of the tension between security and privacy in the digital age, but geopolitics and technology are scaffolding for what is essentially a movie about human resources challenges in a large bureaucracy." Peter Debruge of Variety said, "[i]n many ways, Jason Bourne is the most unsettling movie in the series, seeing as it points to a vast conspiracy directed at the American people, and Greengrass's style—rendered visceral via the marriage of Barry Ackroyd's on-the-fly lensing, a tense techno score, and Rouse's cutting-room trickery—lends itself nicely to an era in which shadow forces rely on such tools as satellite surveillance and facial recognition software." He went on by saying, "just as the initial Damon-driven trilogy wrapped up Bourne's business but left us wanting more, this sequel offers closure even as it entices us with the possibility of his return."

Richard Roeper of the Chicago Sun-Times gave the film three and a half out of four stars, describing Damon's performance as being, "outstanding as the tightly wound, perpetually restless and conflicted Jason Bourne, who is practically a superhero when it comes to fighting but is utterly lost the rest of the time", and said: "Jason Bourne is the best action thriller of the year so far, with a half-dozen terrific chase sequences and fight scenes. At one point the action swings to Vegas, and while some of what transpires is almost cartoonishly over-the-top, it's great fun." Todd McCarthy of The Hollywood Reporter found the film's conclusion and the characters distasteful, writing: "unfortunately, then, the film ends on a flat, unimpressive note, as well as with the realization that, no matter how much time we've spent with them, the characters remain utterly one-dimensional", but went on by saying, "technically and logistically, Greengrass delivers everything you expect from him; there's no one better when it comes to staging complex, chaotic action amid the real life of big cities. As before, cinematographer Barry Ackroyd is a great asset in this regard, and all production and effects hands join seamlessly in the achieved goal of physical verisimilitude."

=== Accolades ===
List of awards and nominations
| Award | Date of ceremony | Category | Recipient(s) | Result | Ref. |
|---|---|---|---|---|---|
| Critics' Choice Awards | December 11, 2016 | Best Action Movie | Jason Bourne | Nominated | |
| Critics' Choice Awards | December 11, 2016 | Best Actor in an Action Movie | Matt Damon | Nominated | |
| Empire Awards | March 19, 2017 | Best Thriller | Jason Bourne | Won | |
| London Film Critics' Circle | January 22, 2017 | Technical Achievement | Gary Powell | Nominated | |
| Saturn Awards | June 28, 2017 | Best Thriller Film | Jason Bourne | Nominated | |
| Screen Actors Guild Awards | January 29, 2017 | Outstanding Performance by a Stunt Ensemble in a Motion Picture | The stunt ensemble of Jason Bourne | Nominated | |
| St. Louis Gateway Film Critics Association | December 18, 2016 | Best Action Movie | Jason Bourne | Nominated | |
| Teen Choice Awards | July 31, 2016 | Choice AnTEENcipated Movie | Jason Bourne | Nominated | |
| Teen Choice Awards | July 31, 2016 | Choice Movie Actor: AnTEENcipated | Matt Damon | Nominated | |
| Teen Choice Awards | July 31, 2016 | Choice Movie Actress: AnTEENcipated | Alicia Vikander | Nominated | |
| Visual Effects Society Awards | February 7, 2017 | Outstanding Supporting Visual Effects in a Photoreal Feature | Dan Barrow, Huw Evans, Julian Gnass, Charlie Noble and Steve Warner | Nominated | |
| Washington D.C. Area Film Critics Association | December 5, 2016 | Best Portrayal of Washington D.C. | Jason Bourne | Nominated | |

== Future ==
In November 2016, producer Frank Marshall acknowledged that Universal Pictures was optimistic regarding a Jason Bourne sequel. By October 2019, Ben Smith—who has served as a producer on the franchise—confirmed that a film was in development. He said that the sequel would tie into the Treadstone television series.

In November 2023, it was announced that a sixth film was in development, with Edward Berger serving as director. It was speculated that Damon might reprise the titular role, although the alternative option was for a different character to lead the cast (similar to The Bourne Legacy). In February 2024, Damon praised Berger as a director, but, at the age of 53, did not commit to reprising the role, should he be asked. In October 2024, Production Weekly reported that the title was listed as The Bourne Dilemma. However, a few weeks later, Berger was vague about his involvement in the film, saying "It's really not clear whether… I'm doing that film or not", and that he was concentrating on his next film, The Ballad of a Small Player.

On March 20, 2025, it was announced that Universal's rights to the franchise expired, though the studio has the option to renew it. Despite this, Ludlum's estate shopped the rights around to potential buyers including Paramount Pictures, Netflix, and Apple Studios. On August 13, 2025, it was announced that NBCUniversal has acquired all of the rights to Robert Ludlum's Bourne book series, excluding publishing rights.

On July 17, 2026, Matt Damon confirmed that he remained in discussions to reprise his role as Jason Bourne in a new film with director Edward Berger. During an appearance on The Rich Eisen Show, Damon said he and Berger were "trying to nail the story down" because he would "love to do it". He added that they hoped to make the film "like the first three" installments in the series, while explaining that the franchise's serialized continuity made developing a sequel more challenging than the standalone format of the James Bond films. Damon also stated that he believed they had "a line of sight" on how to continue the series.

== See also ==
- List of films set in Las Vegas
