= Captivate Entertainment =

- Captivate Entertainment logo
- Type: Limited Liability Company
- Industry: Film
- Genre: Various
- Founded: 2009
- Founder: Jeffrey Weiner; Ben Smith
- Headquarters: Universal City, California, United States
- Key people: Jeffrey Weiner (CEO); Ben Smith (President)
- Products: Films

Captivate Entertainment LLC. is an American film production company, founded by Jeffrey Weiner and Ben Smith in 2009. It has a first-look deal with Universal Studios and it is based on the Universal Studios Backlot in Universal City, California. The company is best known for managing the movie rights of Robert Ludlum's books and producing the 2012 film The Bourne Legacy, starring Jeremy Renner, Rachel Weisz and Edward Norton.

== History ==
Captivate Entertainment was started in 2009 by Jeffrey Weiner, the executor of the Robert Ludlum Estate and Ben Smith, the veteran ICM Partners agent handling Ludlum's works at the Agency. After the successful The Bourne Ultimatum, writer Paul Zetumer was drafted by Universal and Captivate to script a fourth installment of the Bourne Identity franchise which would star Matt Damon and be directed by Paul Greengrass. However, following a dispute between Greengrass and the studio, Damon said he wouldn't make another without his director. Captivate Entertainment and Universal instead filled the gap with the spinoff film The Bourne Legacy, which Tony Gilroy wrote and directed.

== Filmography ==
=== Feature films ===
Released films

#	Title	Release date	Budget	Domestic Gross	Worldwide Gross	Rotten Tomatoes	Metacritic	Refs.
1	The Bourne Legacy	August 10, 2012	$125,000,000	$113,203,870	$276,144,750	55%	61	
2	Jason Bourne	July 29, 2016	$120,000,000	$162,434,410	$415,484,914	56%	58	

Films in development

Title	Refs.
The Chancellor Manuscript	
The Parsifal Mosaic	
Pursuit	
The Janson Directive	

=== Television ===
Title	Season	Episode(s)	First aired	Last aired	Co-production	Network	Notes
Treadstone	1	10	October 15, 2019	December 2019	Universal Content Productions; Imperative Entertainment	USA Network	
