= The Bourne Legacy (film) =

2012 action thriller film directed by Tony Gilroy

- Theatrical release poster
- Directed by: Tony Gilroy
- Screenplay by: Tony Gilroy; Dan Gilroy
- Story by: Tony Gilroy
- Based on: Jason Bourne series by Robert Ludlum
- Produced by: Frank Marshall; Patrick Crowley; Jeffrey M. Weiner; Ben Smith
- Starring: Jeremy Renner; Rachel Weisz; Edward Norton; Albert Finney; Joan Allen; Stacy Keach; Oscar Isaac; Scott Glenn
- Cinematography: Robert Elswit
- Edited by: John Gilroy
- Music by: James Newton Howard
- Production companies: Universal Pictures; Relativity Media; The Kennedy/Marshall Company; Captivate Entertainment
- Distributed by: Universal Pictures
- Release dates: July 30, 2012 (New York City); August 10, 2012 (United States)
- Running time: 135 minutes
- Country: United States
- Language: English
- Budget: $125 million
- Box office: $276.1 million

The Bourne Legacy is a 2012 American action-thriller film directed by Tony Gilroy, who co-wrote the screenplay with his brother Dan. It is the fourth installment in the Bourne series of films following The Bourne Ultimatum (2007). It stars Jeremy Renner, Rachel Weisz, Edward Norton, Albert Finney, Joan Allen, Stacy Keach, Oscar Isaac, and Scott Glenn. The character Jason Bourne does not appear in the film as Matt Damon chose not to appear in the film because Paul Greengrass did not return to direct. The film follows black ops agent Aaron Cross who runs for his life after the exposure of Treadstone and its successor, Blackbriar. Bourne is shown in pictures and mentioned by name several times throughout the film, and parts of The Bourne Legacy take place at the same time as the events portrayed in the previous film, Ultimatum.

While The Bourne Ultimatum was intended to be the final film, plans for a fourth Bourne film were announced in 2008. Gilroy, who co-wrote each of the three previous Bourne films, returned to co-write and direct the film. Filming primarily took place in New York City, with some scenes shot in the Philippines, South Korea, and Canada.

The Bourne Legacy premiered in New York City on July 30, 2012, and was theatrically released in the rest of the United States on August 10. The film received mixed reviews and grossed $276 million worldwide. A fifth film, Jason Bourne, which is a sequel to Ultimatum, was released in 2016.

== Plot ==
Six weeks after Jason Bourne's escape from Russia, (Note: As depicted in The Bourne Supremacy (2004)) Operation Outcome agent Aaron Cross (Number Five) is assigned a training exercise in the Alaskan wilderness as punishment for going AWOL. He must traverse the rugged terrain to find a remote cabin while being stalked by wolves. The cabin is operated by Number Three, another Outcome agent assigned there as punishment. Cross lies and tells Number Three that he has lost his program medication dog tags containing "chems" that Outcome agents must take to maintain their mental and physical enhancements.

Colonel Eric Byer is tasked with containing the fallout from CIA Deputy Director Pamela Landy's exposure of Operations Treadstone and Blackbriar. (Note: As depicted in The Bourne Ultimatum (2007)) He and his team find several online videos in which Treadstone and Outcome medical directors Albert Hirsch and Dan Hillcott appeared together; if discovered, the videos could lead investigators to discover Operation Outcome. Byer orders Outcome to be shut down and its agents and doctors killed to protect the secrecy of other clandestine programs.

Byer deploys an armed Reaper drone to eliminate Cross and Number Three. Number Three is killed, but Cross survives. He shoots down the drone with a rifle and removes a subdermal tracking implant from his hip. He traps an aggressive wolf and forces it to swallow his tracker. Another drone targets the tracker and kills the wolf, leading Byer's team to conclude that Cross was killed. At Sterisyn Morlanta, the pharmaceutical company supporting Outcome, researcher Dr. Donald Foite seemingly snaps and methodically shoots down Hillcott and his colleagues who have been working on Outcome. After being cornered by guards, Foite shoots himself, leaving Dr. Marta Shearing as the program's sole surviving scientist.

Cross travels from Alaska to Chicago to recover a stashed car, money, and fake identification. Running low on "chems" and seeing news that his Outcome provider, Dr. Shearing, had survived the shooting, he drives to her home in Maryland. Meanwhile, Byer sends four assassins disguised as federal agents to kill Dr. Shearing and make it look like a suicide. Cross intervenes, kills the assassins, and burns down Dr. Shearing's house to cover their escape. Shearing tells Cross that the program already used a virus to make his physical enhancements permanent, eliminating his need for physical "chems". Since it is impossible for Cross and Shearing to obtain more mental "chems", they plan to fly to the Philippines to obtain a live virus to make Cross's mental enhancements permanent.

Cross and Shearing use false identities to fly to Manila, bluff their way into a pharmaceutical plant where Sterisyn Morlanta has a research lab, and infect Cross with the live virus. Meanwhile, Byer's team finds CCTV footage of Shearing at JFK airport and determines her itinerary. Byer also learns that Cross is alive and that he, too, flew to Manila. Byer alerts the plant's security team, but Cross subdues the security guards and causes a panic on the plant floor; Cross and Shearing escape in the commotion. Cross becomes incapacitated from the virus, so Shearing gets a room where they can hide and Cross can recover. Byer dispatches LARX #3, a super soldier, to kill Cross and Shearing. The next morning, Cross recovers from being injected with the virus. Local police discover Cross and Shearing's hideout, but they escape on foot. The police and LARX #3 chase them by motorcycle through the streets of Manila. They lose the police and LARX #3 dies while pursuing them, but Cross is shot and loses consciousness. Shearing bribes a nearby boatman to help them escape Manila. Byer and his team, who lost their trail, raid the empty room for clues; they find the message "No More" written on the mirror with Cross's medication dog tags hanging beside it.

Back in New York, Blackbriar supervisor Noah Vosen lies to the Senate, stating that Blackbriar was created solely to track down Bourne and that Pamela Landy committed treason by aiding Bourne and releasing top secret Treadstone files to the press. Meanwhile, Cross recovers from his bullet wounds on the boat out of Manila. He and Shearing use a chart to determine where they should go next.

== Cast ==
- Jeremy Renner as Aaron Cross, Outcome #5 of Operation Outcome. A former US Army soldier born Kenneth J. Kitsom, after being recruited into the program, he was enhanced both mentally and physically and must take chems daily to stay enhanced. He begins to question the program after accidentally killing civilians during a mission.
- Rachel Weisz as Dr. Marta Shearing, a virologist for Sterisyn-Morlanta who specializes in designing and maintaining the enhancements done to Outcome agents.
- Edward Norton as Colonel Eric Byer, USAF (Ret), the Director of the National Research Assay Group (NRAG), a fictional government agency similar to DARPA. He oversees the development and operation of all the supersoldier programs and had a working history with Cross in Somalia.
- Stacy Keach as Adm. Mark Turso, USN (Ret), the Director of Operation Outcome.
- Dennis Boutsikaris as Terrence Ward, CEO of government contractor Sterisyn-Morlanta. His company develops and tests the chems and viruses used to enhance supersoldiers.
- Oscar Isaac as Outcome #3, an Outcome agent assigned to a remote CIA base in Alaska as punishment for falling in love during a mission.
- Joan Allen as Pamela Landy, a former CIA Deputy Director, burned by the CIA after exposing Operations Treadstone and Blackbriar to the media. Her actions lead to the shutdown of Operation Outcome.
- Albert Finney as Dr. Albert Hirsch, a chief architect of the US government's supersoldier programs.
- David Strathairn as General Noah Vosen, USAF (Ret), the former leader of Operation Blackbriar.
- Scott Glenn as Adm. Ezra Kramer, USN, the Director of the CIA.
- Donna Murphy as Dita Mandy, an NRAG official who coordinates the crisis center for Col. Byer.
- Michael Chernus as Arthur Ingram, an NRAG official working for Byer
- Corey Stoll as Zev Vendel, an NRAG official working under Byer
- Željko Ivanek as Dr. Donald Foite, a rogue scientist for Sterisyn-Morlanta who works alongside Dr. Shearing.
- John Arcilla as Joseph, a security guard at Sterisyn-Morlanta's SteriPacific pharmaceutical plant in Manila.
- Shane Jacobson as Mackie, the head of security at Sterisyn-Morlanta's SteriPacific pharmaceutical plant in Manila.
- Elizabeth Marvel as Dr. Connie Dowd, a DoD D-Track assassin tasked with killing Dr. Shearing.
- John Douglas Thompson as Lt. Gen. Paulsen, the JSOC liaison to NRAG
- Louis Ozawa Changchien as LARX #3, a highly advanced super soldier from Thailand dispatched by Byer to kill Aaron.
- David Wilson Barnes as a USAF Reaper drone operator assisting Operation Outcome.
- Neil Brooks Cunningham as Dr. Dan Hillcott, a scientist for Sterisyn-Morlanta and medical director for Operation Outcome.
- Corey Johnson as Ray Wills, a CIA agent and assistant to Vosen
- Michael Berresse as Leonard

== Production ==
=== Development ===
Universal Pictures originally intended The Bourne Ultimatum to be the final film in the series, but development of another film was under way by October 2008. George Nolfi, who co-wrote The Bourne Ultimatum, was to write the script of a fourth film, not to be based on any of the novels by Robert Ludlum. Joshua Zetumer had been hired to write a parallel script—a draft which could be combined with another (Nolfi's, in this instance)—by August 2009 since Nolfi would be directing The Adjustment Bureau that September. Matt Damon stated in November 2009 that no script had been approved and that he hoped that a film would begin shooting in mid-2011. The next month, he said that he would not do another Bourne film without Paul Greengrass, who announced in late November that he had decided not to return as director. In January 2010, Damon said that there would "probably be a prequel of some kind with another actor and another director before we do another one just because I think we're probably another five years away from doing it."

However, it was reported in June 2010 that Tony Gilroy, who co-wrote each of the three previous Bourne films, would be writing a script with his brother, screenwriter Dan Gilroy, for a fourth Bourne film to be released sometime in 2012. That October, Universal set the release date for The Bourne Legacy for August 10, 2012, Tony Gilroy was confirmed as the director of the film, and it was also announced that Jason Bourne will not be appearing in The Bourne Legacy.

Gilroy said he did not get involved with the project "until the rules were that Matt [Damon] was gone, Matt and Paul [Greengrass] were gone, there was no Jason Bourne. That was the given when I had the first conversation about this. So it was very important to me, extremely important to me, that everything that had happened before be well preserved and be enhanced if possible by what we're doing now." He also said, "you could never replace Matt [Damon] as Jason Bourne. This isn't James Bond. You can't do a prequel. You can't do any of those kinds of things, because there was never any cynicism attached to the franchise, and that was the one thing they had to hang on to."

Gilroy "never had any intention of ever coming back to this realm at all—much less write it, much less direct it. Then I started a really casual conversation about what we could do in a post-Jason Bourne setting. I was only supposed to come in for two weeks, but the character we came up with, Aaron Cross, was so compelling." After watching The Bourne Ultimatum again, Gilroy called his brother, screenwriter Dan Gilroy, and said, "'The only thing you could do is sort of pull back the curtain and say there's a much bigger conspiracy.' So we had to deal with what happened in Ultimatum as the starting point of this film. Ultimatum plays in the shadows of Legacy for the first 15 minutes—they overlap."

In speaking about the film's storyline, Gilroy drew a distinction between the fictional programs in the Bourne film series:

On a practical level, the Treadstone program was about assassination. They're basically assassins. They live in the world—you can see Clive Owen [in The Bourne Identity] as a piano teacher, they have covers—but they're essentially assassins. There was nothing that would be described as espionage, [they're] basically a kill squad. The Outcome program that Aaron [played by Jeremy Renner] is part of, [Oscar Isaac's character] is one of them too... The conceit is that [Edward Norton's character] is the mastermind of this entire franchise. We're stepping back a little bit in time here, he's been a developer, he's been at the nexus of the corporate military and intelligence communities. There's a very large corporate element, pharmaceutical corporate element...

Oscar Isaac was Tony Gilroy's top-choice for the lead role of Aaron Cross, even going so far as to have him screen-test for it, but Universal Pictures refused to approve Isaac for the role because he had never led a movie before and they felt it would be risky. Isaac was instead given the smaller but significant role of "Number 3" in reconciliation. Speaking about it in 2014, Isaac said: "Tony was very interested in me playing the role and said he would bat for me with the studio. I did a 12-hour screen test and we talked so much about the part. But two weeks later I got a call from Tony saying ‘It’s not going to happen because the studio just can’t take that chance on an unknown commodity.’ That was pretty hard because it felt like everything was happening... (However) if I had, I couldn’t have done Inside Llewyn Davis and this is a movie that I prepared 34 years for. So sometimes good luck comes in the form of bad luck."

=== Filming ===
Although a large part of the film was set in and around Washington, D.C., the real DC appears only in aerial establishing shots. Most of the film was shot over 12 weeks at the Kaufman Astoria Studios in Queens, New York, including all interior DC scenes. The old house in Hudson, New York, used as Shearing's house was unable to accommodate the weight of equipment and crew, so it was used only for exterior shots, and all interior scenes were filmed on a Kaufman Astoria soundstage. The scenes set in the "SteriPacific" factory in Manila were actually filmed in the New York Times printing plant in Queens.

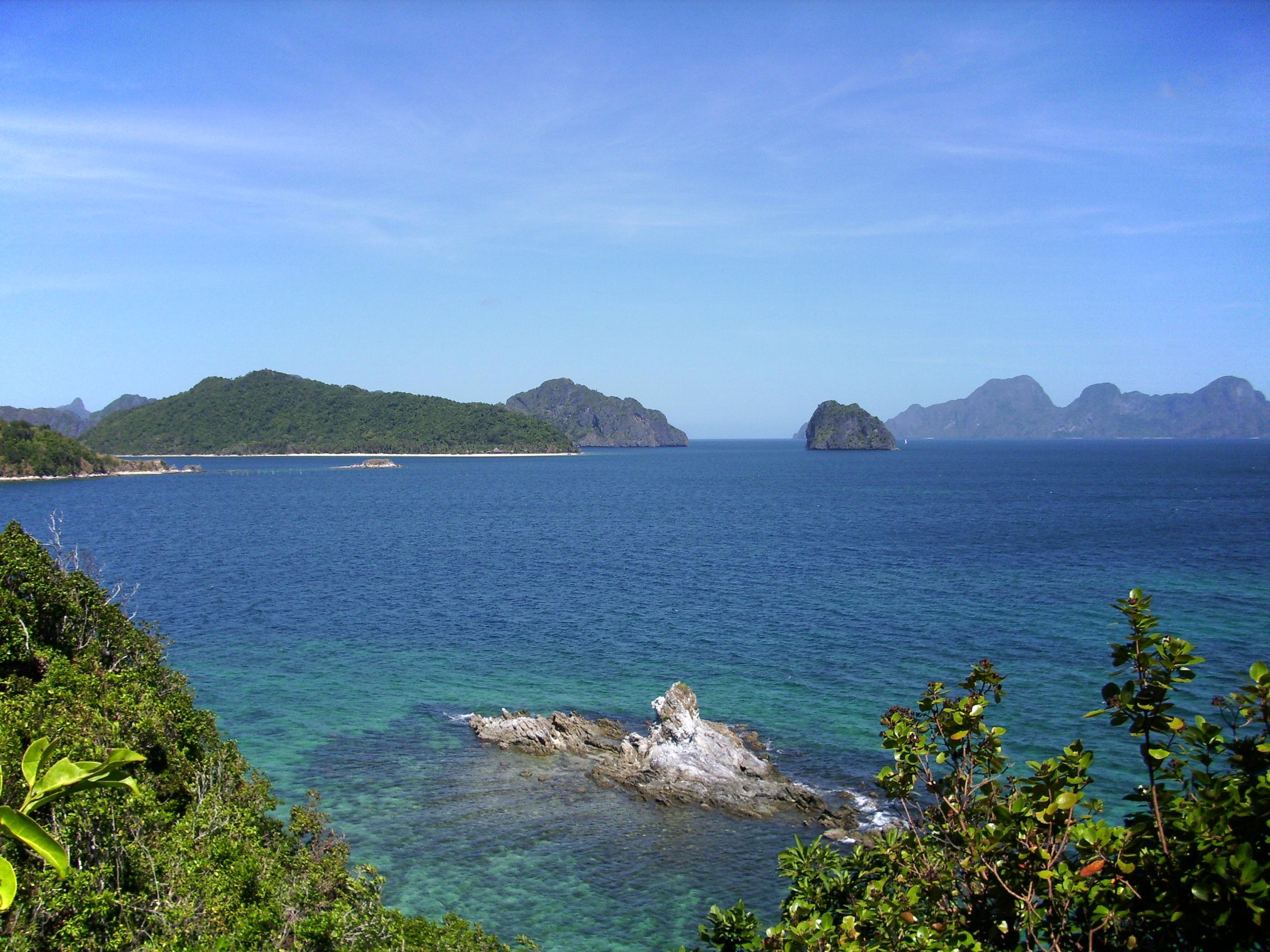
El Nido, Palawan in the Philippines served as a filming location, and in the film, was used as escape route from Manila.

Several scenes were shot overseas, mostly in Manila and Marikina (both within Metro Manila), as well as in the Paradise bay of El Nido, Palawan, in the Philippines. Several train scenes at Garak Market station on Seoul Subway Line 3 and nearby areas in Seocho-daero 77-Gil (1308 Seocho 4-dong), Seocho-gu, and Gangnam-gu, Seoul, South Korea, were used in some scenes. The Kananaskis Country region of Alberta, Canada, was used for the scenes set in Alaska.

Gilroy said, "there are three deleted scenes—we just mixed them and color corrected them [...] but what I like about it is all three scenes happen in the movie. One of them's referred to and they're completely legitimate parts of our story, they absolutely happen in our film, we just didn't have time to show them to you so there's nothing off to the side. I think they'll be on the straight-up DVD."

== Soundtrack ==
The soundtrack to The Bourne Legacy as composed by James Newton Howard, unlike the previous films, which were composed by John Powell, conducted by Pete Anthony, and performed by the Hollywood Studio Symphony. It was released digitally on August 7, 2012, by Back Lot Music and physically on August 21, 2012 by Varèse Sarabande Records. A new version of Moby's "Extreme Ways", entitled "Extreme Ways (Bourne's Legacy)", was recorded for the film's end credits.

== Release ==
The Bourne Legacy premiered in New York City on July 30, 2012. It had its Asian premiere at Resorts World Manila in Pasay, Metro Manila, on August 5, 2012, before its release in North America on August 10.

=== Home media ===
The Bourne Legacy was released on DVD and Blu-ray on December 11, 2012, in the United States and Canada.

== Reception ==
=== Box office ===
The Bourne Legacy grossed $113.2 million in North America and $162.9 million in international markets, for a worldwide total of $276.1 million, against a production budget of $125 million. It was the 29th highest-grossing film of 2012. Worldwide, the film earned $46.6 million during its opening weekend.

In North America, The Bourne Legacy grossed $38.7 million during its opening weekend and debuted at number one, becoming the first film to unseat the previous three-week champion The Dark Knight Rises. Studio research reported that opening-weekend audiences were evenly split between men and women. The opening exceeded Universal's projection of $35 million and sold roughly 400,000 more tickets than The Bourne Identity. In its second weekend, the film fell to number two with $17 million, behind The Expendables 2 ($28.59 million). It remained in second place during its third weekend, earning an additional $9.3 million.

Outside North America, the film's largest opening weekends were in the United Kingdom ($7.2 million), France ($3.4 million), Germany ($2.1 million), and Spain ($1.4 million).

=== Critical response ===
On Rotten Tomatoes, the film holds an approval rating of 56% based on 235 reviews, with an average rating of 5.90/10. The site's critical consensus reads, "It isn't quite as compelling as the earlier trilogy, but The Bourne Legacy proves the franchise has stories left to tell—and benefits from Jeremy Renner's magnetic work in the starring role." On Metacritic, the film has a score of 61 out of 100 based on 42 critics, indicating "generally favorable reviews". Audiences polled by CinemaScore gave the film an average grade of "B" on an A+ to F scale.

Lisa Schwarzbaum of Entertainment Weekly gave the film an A−, commenting that "Gilroy, who as a screenwriter has shaped the movie saga from the beginning, trades the wired rhythms established in the past two episodes by Paul Greengrass for something more realistic and closer to the ground. The change is refreshing. Jason Bourne's legacy is in good hands." Roger Ebert of the Chicago Sun-Times gave the film 2½ stars out of 4, writing: "The Bourne Legacy is always gripping in the moment. The problem is in getting the moments to add up. I freely confess that for at least the first 30 minutes I had no clear idea of why anything was happening. The dialogue is concise, the cinematography is arresting and the plot is a murky muddle."

Peter Debruge of Variety wrote that "the combination of Robert Elswit's elegant widescreen lensing and the measured editing by Tony Gilroy's brother John may be easier to absorb than Greengrass' hyperkinetic docu-based style, but the pic's convoluted script ensures that auds will emerge no less overwhelmed." Michael Atkinson of The Village Voice also wrote a scathing review of the film, saying: "The Bourne films have more than just overstayed their welcome and outlasted the Ludlum books—they've been Van Halenized, with an abrupt change of frontman and a resulting dip in personality."

Kenneth Turan of the Los Angeles Times gave the film a positive review, called the film "an exemplary espionage thriller that has a strong sense of what it wants to accomplish and how best to get there." He especially commended Gilroy's work on the film: "Gilroy knows the underpinnings of this world inside out and appreciates how essential it is to maintain and extend the house style of cool and credible intelligence that marked the previous films." Todd McCarthy of The Hollywood Reporter commented on his review that "the series' legacy is lessened by this capable but uninspired fourth episode."

== Sequel ==
From 2012 onward, various additional Bourne film plans have been made and changed, with some intended to be Legacy sequels starring Renner, and others sequels to the original trilogy and starring Damon. The latter eventually saw release as Jason Bourne in 2016. As of 2017, a second Renner film was considered unlikely, though such a work had been in pre-production stages since 2013. The shifting course of these projects has been somewhat complex.

In September 2012, Universal Pictures had stated at a media conference in Los Angeles that they were likely to release more Bourne films, despite Legacy being given mixed reviews by critics. In a December 2012 interview, Matt Damon revealed that he and Paul Greengrass were interested in returning for the next film as Jason Bourne and the director, respectively.

Damon is reported saying that although he had not seen Legacy, he intends to do so because not only is he curious to see it, but also because he has enjoyed Jeremy Renner in everything he has seen him in. However, in June 2014, executive producer Frank Marshall said that Matt Damon would not be returning for the next Bourne film, contrary to earlier statements made by Damon and rumors surrounding his return to the franchise. On February 21, 2013, it was confirmed that a Bourne 5 was being planned.

On August 2, 2013, Universal hired Tony Gilroy and Anthony Peckham to write the film's script with Renner returning as Cross. On November 8, 2013, the Fast & Furious film series director Justin Lin was announced to direct the film.

On December 2, 2013, it was announced that Renner would return as Cross, Lin would both direct and produce from his production company Perfect Storm Entertainment, and the studio announced an August 14, 2015 release date. On May 9, 2014, Andrew Baldwin was brought in to re-write the film.

On June 18, 2014, the studio pushed back the film from August 14, 2015, to July 15, 2016. In November 2014, the Bourne Legacy sequel was put on hold in favor of Jason Bourne, for which Damon confirmed that he and Greengrass would return.

On January 6, 2015, the studio pushed back the release date to July 29, 2016. The first trailer for the film was aired on February 7, 2016, during Super Bowl 50, which also revealed its title as Jason Bourne. The film premiered July 11, 2016, in the UK and July 29, 2016, in the United States, to mixed reviews.

Producer Frank Marshall said Universal Pictures is hoping to make a sixth film in the franchise, a direct sequel to Jason Bourne. He stated that a sequel to The Bourne Legacy featuring Renner's Cross is unlikely, although he did not explicitly rule it out. However, in March 2017, Matt Damon cast doubt upon any sequel, hinting that people "might be done" with the character.

== See also ==
- List of films featuring surveillance
- List of films featuring drones
