= The Bourne Ultimatum (film) =

2007 action film directed by Paul Greengrass

- Theatrical release poster
- Directed by: Paul Greengrass
- Screenplay by: Tony Gilroy; Scott Z. Burns; George Nolfi
- Story by: Tony Gilroy
- Based on: The Bourne Ultimatum by Robert Ludlum
- Produced by: Frank Marshall; Patrick Crowley; Paul L. Sandberg
- Starring: Matt Damon; Julia Stiles; David Strathairn; Scott Glenn; Paddy Considine; Édgar Ramírez; Albert Finney; Joan Allen
- Cinematography: Oliver Wood
- Edited by: Christopher Rouse
- Music by: John Powell
- Production companies: Universal Pictures; The Kennedy/Marshall Company; Ludlum Entertainment
- Distributed by: Universal Pictures
- Release dates: July 25, 2007 (ArcLight Hollywood); August 3, 2007 (United States)
- Running time: 115 minutes
- Country: United States
- Language: English
- Budget: $110–130 million
- Box office: $444 million

The Bourne Ultimatum is a 2007 American action-thriller film based on Robert Ludlum's character Jason Bourne, a CIA assassin and psychogenic amnesiac portrayed by Matt Damon. Julia Stiles, David Strathairn, Scott Glenn, Paddy Considine, Édgar Ramírez, Albert Finney, and Joan Allen also star. The film was directed by Paul Greengrass and written by Tony Gilroy, Scott Z. Burns, and George Nolfi. Loosely based on the novel of the same name, (Note: Although the film utilizes the title of the novel, its plot is entirely different.) the story takes place both during and after the events of The Bourne Supremacy (2004), and follows Bourne as he continues searching for information about his past before joining Treadstone, while also being pursued by a similar program, Blackbriar.

Following the release of Supremacy, Greengrass agreed to return to direct the third installment. Gilroy, the writer of the previous two films, wanted to explore Bourne seeking redemption for his murders, an aspect that he felt was missing from the previous film. Principal photography began in New York City on October 2, 2006. The visual effects were produced by Double Negative.

The Bourne Ultimatum premiered at ArcLight Hollywood on July 25, 2007, before being theatrically released on August 3 in the United States, by Universal Pictures. It received critical acclaim, grossed $444 million worldwide, and won three Academy Awards. A fourth film, The Bourne Legacy, was released in 2012, without the involvement of Damon or Greengrass. A sequel to Ultimatum, titled simply Jason Bourne, was released in 2016.

== Plot ==
Following his pursuit by Kirill, (Note: As depicted in The Bourne Supremacy (2004)) Jason Bourne evades Moscow police while wounded and deals with more flashbacks of when he first joined Operation Treadstone, seemingly of him being forced to comply with the program. Six weeks later, CIA Deputy Director Pamela Landy reveals the audiotaped confession of Ward Abbott, the late former head of Treadstone, to Director Ezra Kramer. Meanwhile, in Turin, journalist Simon Ross of The Guardian has been writing a column on Bourne. He learns about Operation Blackbriar, the program succeeding Treadstone.

Using the ECHELON system, the CIA detects Ross when he mentions Blackbriar during a phone call to his editor. After informing Marie's brother, Martin Kreutz, of her assassination in India, Bourne, who had read Ross' articles, arranges a meeting with him at London Waterloo station. Realizing the CIA is following Ross, he helps him evade capture, but Ross, in a panic, is shot dead by an assassin named Paz on orders of Operation Blackbriar's section chief Noah Vosen. Vosen's team, reluctantly assisted by Landy, analyzes Ross' notes and identifies his source as Neal Daniels, a CIA station chief based in Madrid. Bourne makes his way to Daniels' office, dispatches Vosen's agents, and finds Nicky Parsons, a former Treadstone operative he has encountered. She tells him that Daniels has fled to Tangier and aids his escape from an arriving CIA unit, hinting at a romantic past prior to his amnesia.

Meanwhile, Blackbriar asset Desh Bouksani is tasked by Vosen with killing Daniels. Upon noticing that Nicky accessed information about Daniels, Vosen suspects her cooperation with Bourne; he orders Bouksani to kill Nicky and Bourne, a decision with which Landy fiercely disagrees. Bourne follows Bouksani and fails to prevent Daniels' assassination. He intercepts Bouksani, who is pursuing Nicky, and strangles him to death. Bourne sends Nicky into hiding. Examining the contents of Daniels' briefcase, Bourne finds the address of the deep-cover CIA bureau in NYC, where Vosen directs Blackbriar, and heads there.

Landy receives a phone call from Bourne, which is intercepted by Vosen. She tells him that his real name is David Webb and gives him the birth date "4-15-71". Vosen also intercepts a text to Landy from Bourne of a location to meet up, and leaves his office with a tactical team. Bourne, however, instead enters Vosen's office, and calls Vosen. Recording Vosen's voice, he accesses the Deputy Director's secure safe and takes classified Blackbriar documents. Realizing what is going on, Vosen sends Paz after Bourne and informs Dr. Albert Hirsch, the man who ran Treadstone's behavior modification program, of this situation. The resulting chase ends with both crashing their cars. Bourne holds the injured Paz at gunpoint, but spares his life.

Bourne meets Landy at a hospital at 415 East 71st Street, having figured out Landy's coded message. He gives Landy the Blackbriar files before going inside. Bourne confronts Hirsch about his past; Hirsch reveals Bourne actually volunteered for Treadstone, and willingly killed a man he knew nothing about to prove his loyalty. While fleeing to the roof, Bourne is confronted by Paz, who questions why Bourne spared him. Bourne asks Paz if he understands the motivation behind his assignments, repeating the final words of the Professor, a Treadstone asset: "Look at us. Look at what they make you give." (Note: As depicted in The Bourne Identity (2002)) Paz lowers his gun, but Vosen appears and shoots at Bourne, who jumps into the East River.

Three days later, Nicky watches a news broadcast about the exposure of Operation Blackbriar, the arrests of Hirsch and Vosen, a criminal investigation against Kramer, and the status of David Webb, a.k.a. Jason Bourne. Upon hearing that his body has not been found, Nicky smiles. He turns out to have survived the fall and swims into the darkness.

== Cast ==
- Matt Damon as Jason Bourne, a former assassin in the CIA's Operation Treadstone who suffers from psychogenic amnesia.
- Julia Stiles as Nicky Parsons, a CIA agent on a post-Treadstone assignment.
- David Strathairn as Noah Vosen, CIA Deputy Director and leader of Operation Blackbriar.
- Scott Glenn as Ezra Kramer, the CIA Director.
- Paddy Considine as Simon Ross, a reporter for the newspaper The Guardian who has been investigating Treadstone.
- Édgar Ramírez as Paz, a Blackbriar assassin tasked with killing Bourne.
- Albert Finney as Dr. Albert Hirsch, the psychologist who oversaw Treadstone's behavioral modification program.
- Joan Allen as Pamela "Pam" Landy, the CIA agent (Note: Landy's title is never stated.) assigned to aid Vosen in catching Bourne.
- Tom Gallop as Tom Cronin, Pamela Landy's assistant.
- Corey Johnson as Ray Wills, Noah Vosen's assistant.
- Daniel Brühl as Martin Kreutz, Marie's brother.

In addition, Colin Stinton plays Neal Daniels, a CIA Station Chief who is leaking information to Ross, while Joey Ansah plays Desh, the Blackbriar assassin sent to kill Daniels and later Bourne.

== Production ==
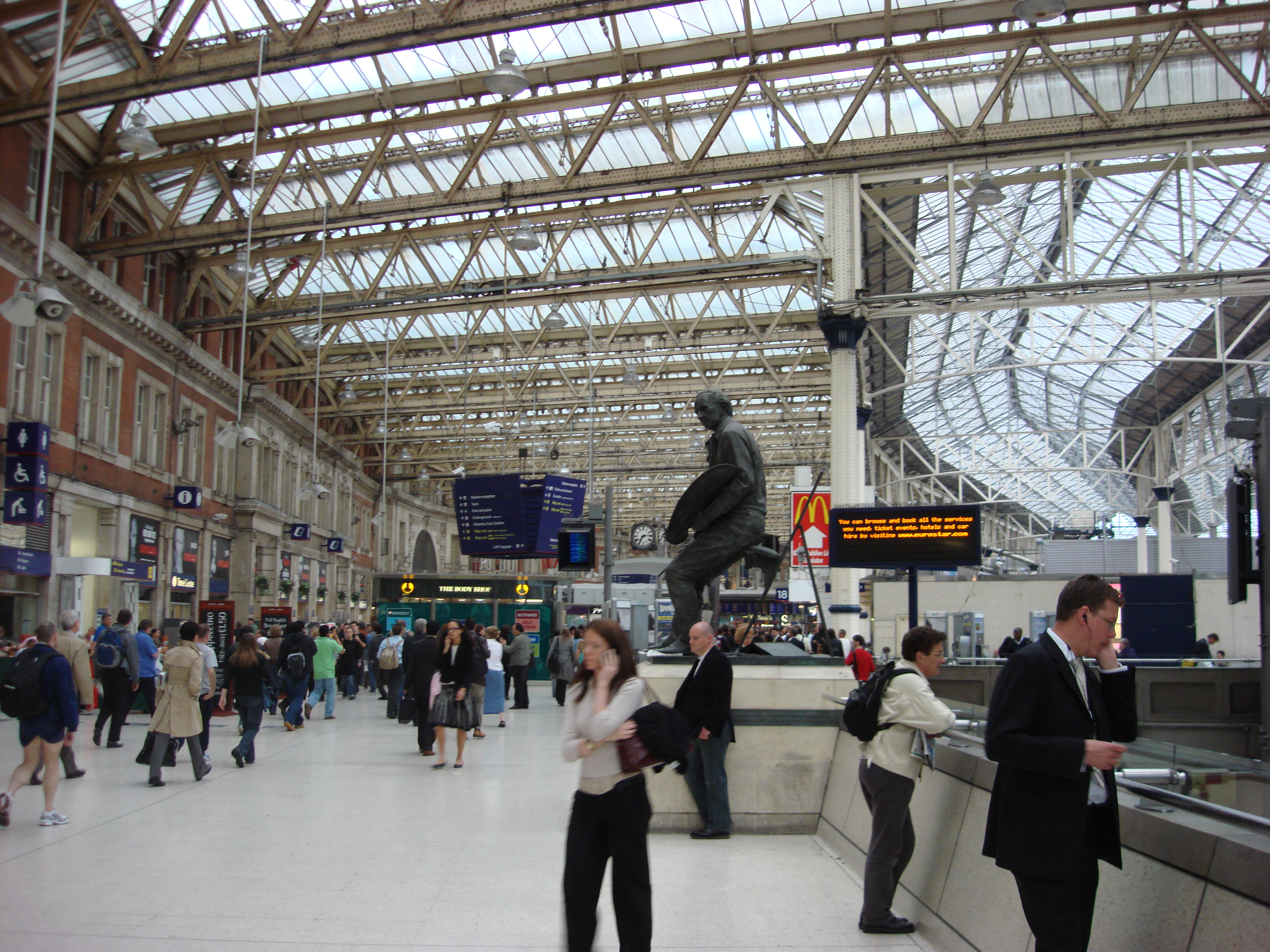
Scenes were filmed at London Waterloo station between October 2006 and April 2007

The Bourne Ultimatum was filmed at Pinewood Studios near London and in multiple locations around the world, including Tangier, London, Paris, Madrid (as itself and double for Turin), Berlin (as double for Moscow), New York City including the Springs Mills Building (as the deep cover CIA offices), and other locations in the U.S.

Tony Gilroy, who had co-written the screenplays of the first two Bourne films, had intended The Bourne Supremacy to emphasise Bourne's repentance and atonement for his murders, but felt that the released film omitted this focus. Gilroy was persuaded to write an initial draft of The Bourne Ultimatum, but did not participate further, and as of 2009 had not watched the finished film. Gilroy's screenplay draft was subsequently criticized by Matt Damon.Tom Stoppard wrote a draft of the screenplay, later saying "I don't think there's a single word of mine in the film."

Greengrass said the film included several allusions to scenes from previous Bourne films. Most of the film's runtime takes place within the events of The Bourne Supremacy, with the opening chase sequence picking up immediately after Bourne's confrontation with Kirill in Moscow near the end of previous film and takes place soon after Bourne's apology to Neski's daughter. Before the third act, the film recreates Bourne's phone call to Landy in the final scene of Supremacy, and then moves past it in the timeline.

Paul Greengrass spoke about the characterization of Jason Bourne in The Bourne Ultimatum shortly before its release:

Bourne is a real man in a real world in pursuit of a mythic quest. What's wonderful is that it's an oppositional story. Is he a killer, or was he made to be a killer? There is an underlying feeling that Bourne is one of us, and he's running away from "them." He's trying to get answers, and he doesn't trust them. They're all bad, and the system's corrupted. To convey that with a sense of excitement in a very contemporary land-scape is great fun. [...] If you opened your door in New York or Paris or London or whatever, you've got to believe that whatever the story it is that Bourne's engaged in [, something] could be happening there. [...] What attracts me to Bourne's world is that it is a real world and I think I'm most comfortable there.

=== Visual effects ===
The visual effects for the film were produced by Double Negative, marking their second collaboration with a movie directed by Paul Greengrass, following United 93 (2006). The studio's production visual effects supervisor, Peter Chiang, oversaw the visual effects production with more than 590 "invisible" shots for the film being made, including set extensions, digital doubles, computer-generated cars, debris, and hundreds of 2D fixes, all of which were for key sequences in the movie.

== Music ==
The Bourne Ultimatum: Original Motion Picture Soundtrack is the official soundtrack for the film. As with the previous installments in the Bourne film series, the score was composed by John Powell, and the soundtrack was released by Decca Records in 2007. A new version of Moby's single "Extreme Ways", entitled "Extreme Ways (Bourne's Ultimatum)", was recorded for the film's end credits.

"Scotty Doesn't Know", which Bourne listens to while sniping, is a song that Damon's character sings in EuroTrip.

== Release ==
A premiere of The Bourne Ultimatum was held in downtown Oklahoma City on July 31, 2007, at Harkins Bricktown Theaters to benefit The Children's Center, located in suburban Bethany. The film was shown simultaneously on three screens. Matt Damon was at the event to greet guests. The film premiered at Leicester Square in London on August 15, 2007, with Matt Damon, Julia Stiles and Joan Allen attending. The film was released the next day. The film premiered in Sydney on August 8, 2007, at the State Theatre, with Matt Damon attending. An advance screening of The Bourne Ultimatum was held at The Egyptian Theatre to benefit Boise Contemporary Theater on July 30, 2007. Producer Frank Marshall and actor Matt Damon were in attendance. The first two films, The Bourne Identity and The Bourne Supremacy, also had advance charity screenings in Boise. The Bourne Ultimatum was released nationwide on August 30, 2007.

=== Home media ===
The film was released on both DVD and HD DVD on December 11, 2007 in North America. The DVD was released in both Fullscreen and 2.35:1 Widescreen aspect ratios. The HD DVD and DVD special features include several deleted scenes, featurettes, audio commentary, and exclusively on the HD DVD version, HDi Interactive Format features such as Picture-in-Picture Video Commentary. In addition to the stand-alone DVD release, there is a limited edition 'The Jason Bourne Collection' gift set, featuring all three films on DVD and a bonus disc with myriad bonus features such as deleted scenes and featurettes. The gift set features Swiss Bank safe deposit box packaging including foreign currency and a Jason Bourne passport. The film and special features on the HD DVD version are presented in 2:35:1 Widescreen high definition 1080i and offer Dolby TrueHD 5.1 lossless and Dolby Digital Plus 5.1 audio options.

== Reception ==
=== Box office ===
The Bourne Ultimatum earned $69,283,690 during its opening weekend at the box office, which at the time had the highest August opening weekend, beating Rush Hour 2. It would hold that record for seven years until it was overtaken by Guardians of the Galaxy in 2014. At the end of its theatrical release, the film grossed a total of $227,471,070 in the U.S. and $216,572,326 in foreign markets for a worldwide total of $444,043,396, making it the highest-grossing film in the series.

=== Critical response ===
The Bourne Ultimatum garnered acclaim from critics, with praise for its intense action, gritty realism, rapid pacing, and Matt Damon's performance. The review aggregation website Rotten Tomatoes reported that out of 263 critic reviews, 92% of them were positive, with an average rating of 8.1/10. The site's consensus states: "The Bourne Ultimatum is an intelligent, finely tuned non-stop thrill ride. Another strong performance from Matt Damon and sharp camerawork from Paul Greengrass make this the finest installment of the Bourne trilogy." Metacritic assigned the film a weighted average score of 85 out of 100, based on 38 critics, indicating "universal acclaim". Audiences surveyed by CinemaScore gave the film a grade "A" on scale of A+ to F. All segments of the audience gave it a grade "A" or better. The audience was 56% male, and 82% was 25 or older.

Like its predecessor, The Bourne Supremacy, the film was criticized for its use of "shaky" camerawork, as Richard Corliss of Time magazine, in an otherwise positive review, wondered "why, in the chat scenes, the camera is afflicted with Parkinson's? The film frame trembles, obscures the speaker with the listener's shoulder, annoys viewers and distracts them from the content of the scene."

In the British press, the inclusion of a fictional journalist from the real British paper The Guardian and scenes set in the United Kingdom (particularly Waterloo railway station) were commented upon. In particular, that newspaper's reviewer joked that "dodging bullets from a CIA sniper... is the sort of thing which happens to us Guardian journalists all the time".

The film was also well received in the hacker subculture, as it showed actual real-world applications such as the Bourne-again shell (inspired by the Bourne shell developed by Stephen R. Bourne, not the fictional Jason Bourne) and Nmap, unlike many other films featuring hacking scenes (such as Hackers). In 2012, the Motion Picture Editors Guild listed it as the 66th best-edited film of all time based on a survey of its membership.

=== Top ten lists ===
The film appeared on several critics' top ten lists of the best films of 2007.

- 1st — Empire
- 1st — Best Action/Adventure, Rotten Tomatoes
- 2nd — Claudia Puig, USA Today
- 2nd — Steven Rea, The Philadelphia Inquirer
- 2nd — Joshua Rothkopf, Time Out New York
- 9th — Rene Rodriguez, The Miami Herald
- 10th — Christy Lemire, Associated Press

=== Accolades ===
Award	Ceremony	Category	Recipient	Result
Academy Awards	February 24, 2008	Best Film Editing	Christopher Rouse	Won
Academy Awards	February 24, 2008	Best Sound Editing	Karen M. Baker and Per Hallberg	Won
Academy Awards	February 24, 2008	Best Sound Mixing	Scott Millan, David Parker and Kirk Francis	Won
Art Directors Guild Awards	February 16, 2008	Excellence in Production Design for a Contemporary Film	Peter Wenham	Nominated
BAFTA Awards	February 10, 2008	Best Direction	Paul Greengrass	Nominated
BAFTA Awards	February 10, 2008	Best Cinematography	Oliver Wood	Nominated
BAFTA Awards	February 10, 2008	Best Editing	Christopher Rouse	Won
BAFTA Awards	February 10, 2008	Best Sound	Scott Millan, David Parker, Kirk Francis, Karen Baker Landers and Per Hallberg	Won
BAFTA Awards	February 10, 2008	Best Special Visual Effects	Peter Chiang, Charlie Noble, Mattias Lindahl, and Joss Williams	Nominated
Crime Thriller Awards	October 3, 2008	Film of the Year	—N/a	Won
MTV Movie Awards	June 1, 2008	Best Performance	Matt Damon as Jason Bourne	Nominated
MTV Movie Awards	June 1, 2008	Best Fight	Matt Damon vs. Joey Ansah	Nominated
People's Choice Awards	January 8, 2008	Favorite Threequel	The Bourne Ultimatum	Nominated
People's Choice Awards	January 8, 2008	Favorite Action Movie	The Bourne Ultimatum	Won
Screen Actors Guild Awards	January 27, 2008	Outstanding Performance by a Stunt Ensemble in a Motion Picture	—N/a	Won

== Sequels ==
In May 2007, prior to the release of The Bourne Ultimatum, Matt Damon claimed that he would not be interested in returning for a fourth Bourne film, stating (of his participation in the Bourne franchise): "We have ridden that horse as far as we can." Damon said in August 2007:

I think in terms of another one, the story of this guy's search for his identity is over, because he's got all the answers, so there's no way we can trot out the same character, and so much of what makes him interesting is that internal struggle that was happening for him, am I a good guy, am I a bad guy, what is the secret behind my identity, what am I blocking out, why am I remembering these disturbing images? So all of that internal propulsive mechanism that drives the character is not there, so if there was to be another one then it would have to be a complete reconfiguration, you know, where do you go from there? For me I kind of feel like the story that we set out to tell has now been told. I love the character, and if Paul Greengrass calls me in ten years and says, 'Now we can do it, because it's been ten years and I have a way to bring him back,' then there's a world in which I can go, 'Yeah, absolutely.' We could get the band back together if there was a great idea behind it, but in terms of now and this story, that part—the story's been told...

However, on February 22, 2008, Variety reported that a fourth film was indeed in the works, with both Damon and Greengrass on board.

On October 16, 2008, it was announced that George Nolfi would write the script, with Frank Marshall producing, and Jeffrey Weiner and Henry Morrison executive producing. Matt Damon, Julia Stiles, Joan Allen, and Paul Greengrass were also attached to the film. Joshua Zetumer had been hired to write a parallel script—a draft which could be combined with another (Nolfi's, in this instance)—by August 2009 since Nolfi would be directing The Adjustment Bureau that September.

On February 1, 2010, Damon, speaking at the U.K. premiere of Invictus, revealed that a follow-up to The Bourne Ultimatum was "at least five years away". Greengrass, also at the premiere, re-stated that he would not be part of any further Bourne films "unless the right script came along". However, Damon revealed that in the meantime there may be a Bourne "prequel of some kind, with another actor and another director". Matt Damon reconfirmed this on a March 10, 2010 appearance of Today and that he would only be involved if Greengrass was directing.

In June 2010, it was announced that Tony Gilroy would be writing The Bourne Legacy and it would have a 2012 release date. That October, Gilroy was announced as the director of The Bourne Legacy; he confirmed that Damon would not return for this film and that there would be "a whole new hero":

This is not a reboot, it's a whole new chapter. The easiest way to think of it is an expansion or a reveal. Jason Bourne will not be in this film, but he's very much alive. What happened in the first three films is the trigger for The Bourne Legacy, and everyone who got into them will be rewarded for paying attention. I'm building a legend and an environment and a wider conspiracy. We're going to show you the bigger picture, the bigger canvas... The world we're making enhances and advances and invites Jason Bourne's reappearance somewhere down the road."

The Bourne Legacy was released in the U.S. on August 10, 2012.

Universal Pictures stated at a media conference in Los Angeles, California, that they are likely to release more Bourne films, despite The Bourne Legacy being given mixed reviews by critics. On September 15, 2014, it was announced that Damon and Greengrass will indeed return for the next Bourne film, taking the release date, with Renner returning as Cross in a separate film at a later date. On June 18, 2014, the studio pushed back the film from August 14, 2015, to July 15, 2016. The film Jason Bourne premiered in the United States on July 29, 2016 to mixed reviews.

== See also ==
- List of films featuring surveillance
