= Chuntex Electronic =

Taiwanese computer display manufacturer

Chuntex Electronic Co., Ltd.
- Trade name: CTX International
- Company type: Public
- Industry: Electronics
- Founded: 1981; 44 years ago in Taiwan
- Products: Computer monitors
- Number of employees: 5,000 (1999, peak)

Chuntex Electronic Co., Ltd., also known as CTX International, is a Taiwanese computer display manufacturer.

== History ==
Chuntex Electronic Co., Ltd. was founded in 1981. Initially only a domestic manufacturer of cathode-ray-tube computer monitors within Taiwan, Chuntex expanded globally in 1986, establishing CTX International—their United States and primary international export subsidiary—that year, placing its headquarters in the City of Industry, California. In the United Kingdom, meanwhile, Chuntex established European offices in the Netherlands and the United Kingdom (Watford), employing 75 between them in 2004. Between the late 1980s to the late 1990s, the company acquired several overseas companies in the field of computer monitors and hardware, helping CTX grow to become one of the largest brands and OEM suppliers of monitors. In the early 1990s, they established their Opto subsidiary, which manufactured LCD monitors and projectors.

Chuntex's largest export market in 1995 was the United States (62 percent), compared with Asia (19 percent) and Europe (15 percent). Between fall 1992 and fall 1993, sales in CTX's wares grew from US$15.5 million to $27.2 million. The company earned US$11.5 million in profit on sales of roughly $250 million in 1998. By 1999, the company had 5,000 employees globally.

In August 1994, Chuntex purchased a 51-percent stake in Veridata Electronics, a computer company in Taiwanese, with Chuntex seeking the latter's laptop-manufacturing factory lines and workforce. After acquiring an even larger stake in Veridata, Chuntex then began selling computers branded under their own CTX name, as well as for other computer vendors, such as CompUSA in 1996, on an OEM basis. Though CTX was a relatively small name in the personal computer market at the time, the company initially earned a respectable profit from these systems, which included the sub-brands EzNote for their laptops and Nutopia for their desktop computers. However, in April 1999, the company reported losses equal to roughly half of their market capitalization, which the company attributed in large part to their laptop business. These losses put CTX in the red; in the process, they were the first major Taiwanese company to go bankrupt in 1999. Chuntex shortly after filed for reorganization protection in Taiwan. A few months later, the company announced that they would abandon manufacturing complete computer systems, in favor of focusing solely on monitor production while still selling some systems, albeit built by other companies and rebadged as CTX machines.

CTX remains active in Taiwan as of 2023.
