= William Blake Herron =

American screenwriter

William Blake Herron is an American screenwriter, director and actor, best known for contributing to the screenplay for The Bourne Identity.

== Early life ==
Born in Texas, Herron grew up in Chicago, Illinois, and later Faribault, Minnesota. His Texan parents provided inspiration for his film, A Texas Funeral. He studied acting at Middlebury College and the Pushkin Institute, before performing with various bands and working as a paralegal.

== Career ==
Shifting from law to screenwriting, Herron was a semi-finalist of the Nichol Fellowship, and the top twenty of the Sundance Writer's Lab, the prestige of which helped land him an assignment at Warner Bros. He contributed, uncredited, to the screenplay for 1991's Eye of the Widow, as well as wrote on television series such as The Lazarus Man. Universal Pictures acquired the film rights to Robert Ludlum's Bourne books in the hopes of starting a franchise. After Tony Gilroy, Herron was brought in to rewrite the script in 1999. The film became a critical and commercial success, grossing $214 million. Herron would also work on Ripley Under Ground, which had a delayed release in 2005, and the 2008 comedy Role Models.

In 2015, Herron created Agent X, an action series which aired from November 8 to December 27, 2015, on TNT. The series centered on a special government operative, who handles sensitive cases that the CIA and the FBI can't. On December 15, 2015, TNT decided to cancel the series after just one season. Herron was also writing a biopic of the band Kiss, Shout It Out Loud , but was later replaced by Ole Sanders and Joachim Rønning.

== Personal life ==
Herron is married and has two children.
