= List of accolades received by Nightcrawler =

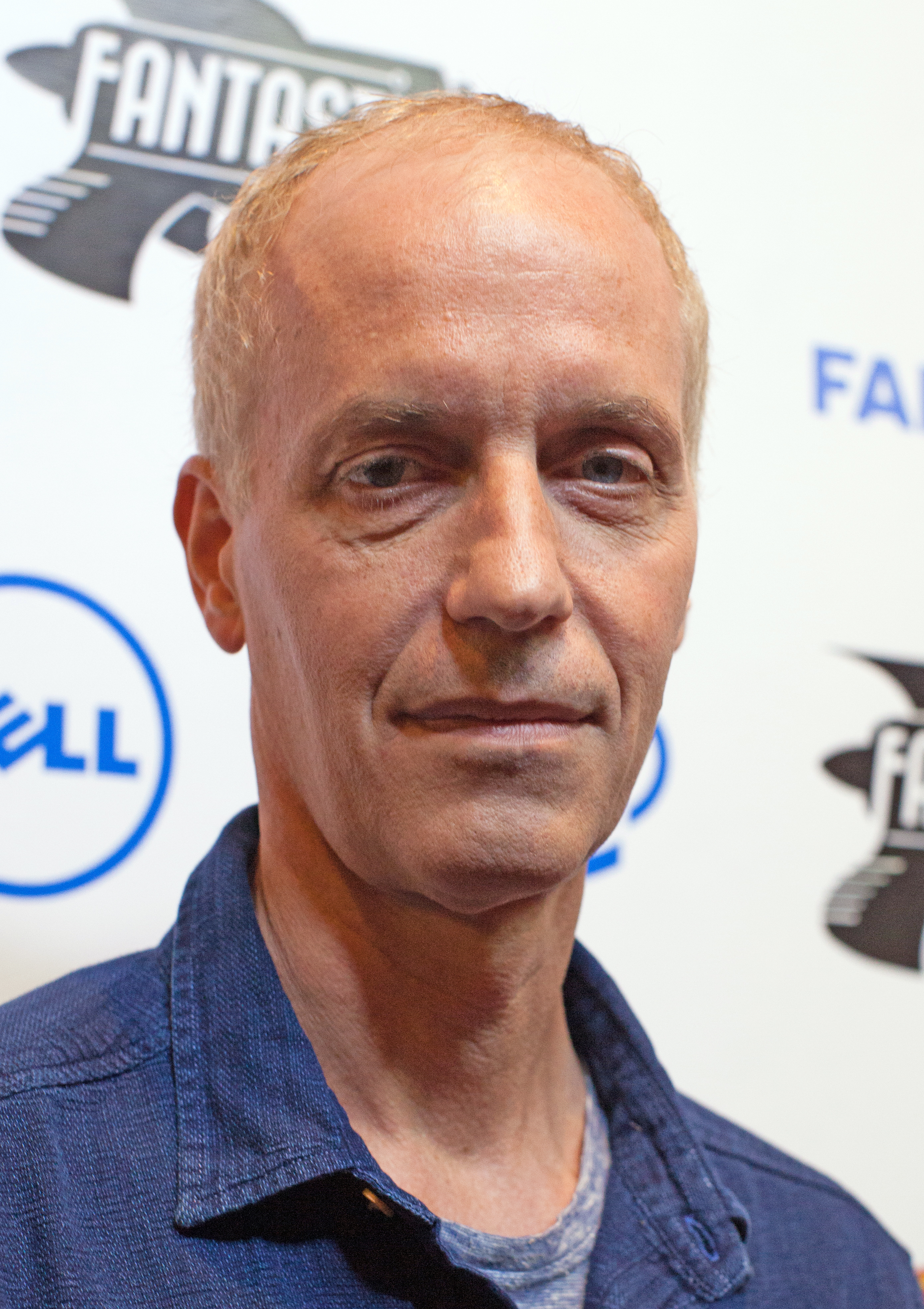
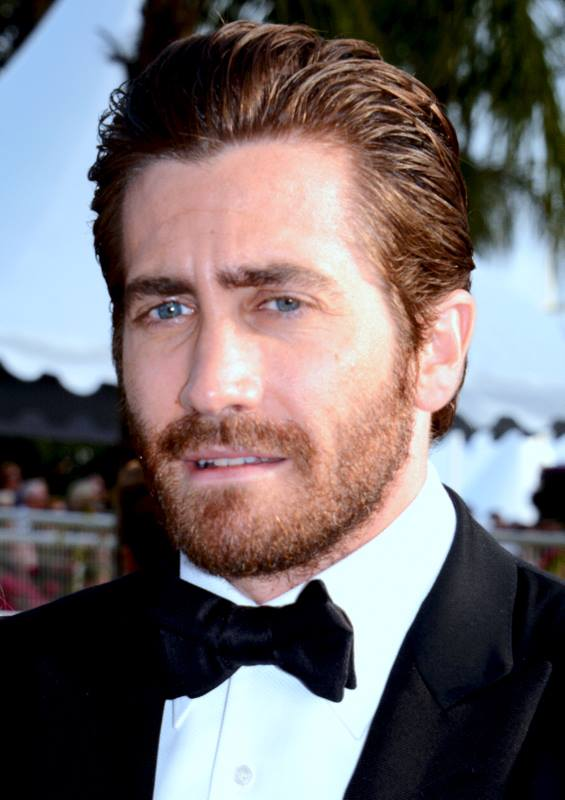
- Dan Gilroy (left) and Jake Gyllenhaal (right) received several awards and nominations for their script and performance, respectively.
Accolades
Award	Won	Nominated
AACTA Awards	0	1
Academy Awards	0	1
Alliance of Women Film Journalists	0	1
American Cinema Editors	0	1
American Film Institute	1	1
Art Directors Guild	0	1
Austin Film Critics Association	3	4
Australian Film Critics Association	0	1
Boston Society of Film Critics	1	1
British Academy Film Awards	0	4
Chicago Film Critics Association	0	2
Critics' Choice Movie Awards	0	3
Dallas–Fort Worth Film Critics Association	0	2
Detroit Film Critics Society	0	2
Dublin Film Critics' Circle	0	1
Dorian Awards	0	1
Florida Film Critics Circle	0	1
Golden Globe Awards	0	1
Gotham Awards	0	3
Houston Film Critics Society	1	3
Independent Spirit Awards	2	5
Irish Film & Television Academy	0	1
Location Managers Guild Awards	0	1
London Film Critics' Circle	0	4
Los Angeles Film Critics Association	0	1
Make-Up Artists & Hair Stylists Guild	0	1
National Board of Review	1	1
National Society of Film Critics	0	1
New York Film Critics Online	1	1
Online Film Critics Society	0	2
Palm Springs International Film Festival	1	1
Producers Guild of America Awards	0	1
San Diego Film Critics Society	7	9
San Francisco Film Critics Circle	0	1
Satellite Awards	1	2
Saturn Awards	1	3
Screen Actors Guild Awards	0	1
St. Louis Film Critics Association	0	4
Toronto Film Critics Association	0	2
Vancouver Film Critics Circle	1	1
Writers Guild of America Awards	0	1
- Total number of awards and nominations
Totals	22	77
- Footnotes

Nightcrawler is 2014 American thriller film written and directed by Dan Gilroy. The film stars Jake Gyllenhaal as Lou Bloom, a stringer who records violent events late at night in Los Angeles, and sells the footage to a local television news station. Rene Russo, Riz Ahmed, and Bill Paxton feature in supporting roles. The film premiered at the 2014 Toronto International Film Festival on September 5, before receiving a theatrical release on October 31, distributed by Open Road Films. Nightcrawler earned a worldwide total of $50.3 million on a production budget of $8.5 million. Rotten Tomatoes, a review aggregator, surveyed 232 reviews and judged 95 percent to be positive.

Nightcrawler received awards and nominations in a variety of categories, with particular praise for Gilroy's screenplay and Gyllenhaal's performance. At the 87th Academy Awards, Gilroy was nominated for an Academy Award for Best Original Screenplay. The film received an additional four nominations at the 68th British Academy Film Awards, three nominations at the 20th Critics' Choice Awards, one nomination at the 72nd Golden Globe Awards, and one nomination at 21st Screen Actors Guild Awards, but did not win any of them. Nightcrawler did fare better at award ceremonies held by critics' organizations, particularly the 19th San Diego Film Critics Society Awards, where it won seven out of its nine nominations. These included Best Actor, Best Director, and Best Film. The American Film Institute and the National Board of Review included Nightcrawler in their lists of top ten films of the year. Gyllenhaal was nominated for the BAFTA Award, Screen Actors Guild Award, Golden Globe Award and Critics' Choice Movie Award, surprisingly missing in the Best Actor Oscar category.

== Accolades ==
Award	Date of ceremony	Category	Recipients	Result	Ref.
AACTA Awards	January 31, 2015	Best International Actor	Jake Gyllenhaal	Nominated	
Academy Awards	February 22, 2015	Best Original Screenplay	Dan Gilroy	Nominated	
Alliance of Women Film Journalists	January 12, 2015	Best Actor	Jake Gyllenhaal	Nominated	
American Cinema Editors	January 30, 2015	Best Edited Feature Film – Dramatic	John Gilroy	Nominated	
American Film Institute	December 9, 2014	Top Ten Movies of the Year	Nightcrawler	Won	
Art Directors Guild	January 31, 2015	Excellence in Production Design for a Contemporary Film	Kevin Kavanaugh	Nominated	
Austin Film Critics Association	December 17, 2014	Best Actor	Jake Gyllenhaal	Won	
Austin Film Critics Association	December 17, 2014	Best First Film	Dan Gilroy	Won	
Austin Film Critics Association	December 17, 2014	Best Original Screenplay	Dan Gilroy	Won	
Austin Film Critics Association	December 17, 2014	Top Ten Films of the Year	Nightcrawler	Sixth place	
Australian Film Critics Association	February 7, 2015	Best International Film (English Language)	Nightcrawler	Nominated	
Boston Society of Film Critics	December 7, 2014	Best New Filmmaker	Dan Gilroy	Won	
British Academy Film Awards	February 8, 2015	Best Actor in a Leading Role	Jake Gyllenhaal	Nominated	
British Academy Film Awards	February 8, 2015	Best Actress in a Supporting Role	Rene Russo	Nominated	
British Academy Film Awards	February 8, 2015	Best Editing	John Gilroy	Nominated	
British Academy Film Awards	February 8, 2015	Best Original Screenplay	Dan Gilroy	Nominated	
Chicago Film Critics Association	December 15, 2014	Best Actor	Jake Gyllenhaal	Nominated	
Chicago Film Critics Association	December 15, 2014	Most Promising Filmmaker	Dan Gilroy	Nominated	
Critics' Choice Movie Awards	January 15, 2015	Best Actor	Jake Gyllenhaal	Nominated	
Critics' Choice Movie Awards	January 15, 2015	Best Original Screenplay	Dan Gilroy	Nominated	
Critics' Choice Movie Awards	January 15, 2015	Best Picture	Nightcrawler	Nominated	
Dallas–Fort Worth Film Critics Association	December 15, 2014	Best Actor	Jake Gyllenhaal	Fourth place	
Dallas–Fort Worth Film Critics Association	December 15, 2014	Top 10 Films	Nightcrawler	Tenth place	
Detroit Film Critics Society	December 15, 2014	Best Actor	Jake Gyllenhaal	Nominated	
Detroit Film Critics Society	December 15, 2014	Best Supporting Actress	Rene Russo	Nominated	
Dublin Film Critics' Circle	December 17, 2014	Best Actor	Jake Gyllenhaal	Nominated	
Dorian Awards	January 20, 2015	Film Performance of the Year – Actor	Jake Gyllenhaal	Nominated	
Florida Film Critics Circle	December 19, 2014	Best Actor	Jake Gyllenhaal	Nominated	
Golden Globe Awards	January 11, 2015	Best Actor – Motion Picture Drama	Jake Gyllenhaal	Nominated	
Gotham Awards	October 23, 2014	Audience Award	Nightcrawler	Nominated	
Gotham Awards	October 23, 2014	Breakthrough Actor	Riz Ahmed	Nominated	
Gotham Awards	October 23, 2014	Breakthrough Director	Dan Gilroy	Nominated	
Houston Film Critics Society	January 10, 2015	Best Actor	Jake Gyllenhaal	Won	
Houston Film Critics Society	January 10, 2015	Best Picture	Nightcrawler	Nominated	
Houston Film Critics Society	January 10, 2015	Best Screenplay	Dan Gilroy	Nominated	
Independent Spirit Awards	February 21, 2015	Best Editing	John Gilroy	Nominated	
Independent Spirit Awards	February 21, 2015	Best First Feature	Dan Gilroy, Jennifer Fox, Tony Gilroy, Jake Gyllenhaal, David Lancaster and Michel Litvak	Won	
Independent Spirit Awards	February 21, 2015	Best Male Lead	Jake Gyllenhaal	Nominated	
Independent Spirit Awards	February 21, 2015	Best Screenplay	Dan Gilroy	Won	
Independent Spirit Awards	February 21, 2015	Best Supporting Male	Riz Ahmed	Nominated	
Irish Film & Television Academy	May 24, 2015	Best International Actor	Jake Gyllenhaal	Nominated	
Location Managers Guild Awards	March 7, 2015	Outstanding Locations in a Contemporary Film	Curtis Collins and Mike Brewer	Nominated	
London Film Critics' Circle	January 18, 2015	Actor of the Year	Jake Gyllenhaal	Nominated	
London Film Critics' Circle	January 18, 2015	Film of the Year	Nightcrawler	Nominated	
London Film Critics' Circle	January 18, 2015	Screenwriter of the Year	Dan Gilroy	Nominated	
London Film Critics' Circle	January 18, 2015	Supporting Actor of the Year	Riz Ahmed	Nominated	
Los Angeles Film Critics Association	December 7, 2014	Best Supporting Actress	Rene Russo	Runner–up	
Make-Up Artists & Hair Stylists Guild	February 14, 2015	Best Contemporary Make-Up, Film	Donald Mowat and Malanie Romero	Nominated	
National Board of Review	December 2, 2014	Top Ten Films	Nightcrawler	Won	
National Society of Film Critics	January 3, 2015	Best Supporting Actress	Rene Russo	Nominated	
New York Film Critics Online	December 7, 2014	Best Debut Director	Dan Gilroy	Won	
Online Film Critics Society	December 15, 2014	Best Actor	Jake Gyllenhaal	Nominated	
Online Film Critics Society	December 15, 2014	Best Picture	Nightcrawler	Nominated	
Palm Springs International Film Festival	January 3, 2015	Variety's 10 Directors to Watch	Dan Gilroy	Won	
Producers Guild of America Awards	January 24, 2015	Best Theatrical Motion Picture	Jennifer Fox and Tony Gilroy	Nominated	
San Diego Film Critics Society	December 15, 2014	Best Actor	Jake Gyllenhaal	Won	
San Diego Film Critics Society	December 15, 2014	Best Cinematography	Robert Elswit	Won	
San Diego Film Critics Society	December 15, 2014	Best Director	Dan Gilroy	Won	
San Diego Film Critics Society	December 15, 2014	Best Editing	John Gilroy	Nominated	
San Diego Film Critics Society	December 15, 2014	Best Film	Nightcrawler	Won	
San Diego Film Critics Society	December 15, 2014	Best Original Screenplay	Dan Gilroy	Won	
San Diego Film Critics Society	December 15, 2014	Best Score	James Newton Howard	Won	
San Diego Film Critics Society	December 15, 2014	Best Supporting Actor	Riz Ahmed	Nominated	
San Diego Film Critics Society	December 15, 2014	Best Supporting Actress	Rene Russo	Won	
San Francisco Film Critics Circle	December 14, 2014	Best Actor	Jake Gyllenhaal	Nominated	
Satellite Awards	February 15, 2015	Best Actor – Motion Picture	Jake Gyllenhaal	Nominated	
Satellite Awards	February 15, 2015	Best Original Screenplay	Dan Gilroy	Won	
Saturn Awards	June 25, 2015	Best Actor	Jake Gyllenhaal	Nominated	
Saturn Awards	June 25, 2015	Best Supporting Actress	Rene Russo	Won	
Saturn Awards	June 25, 2015	Best Thriller Film	Nightcrawler	Nominated	
Screen Actors Guild Awards	January 25, 2015	Outstanding Performance by a Male Actor in a Leading Role	Jake Gyllenhaal	Nominated	
St. Louis Film Critics Association	December 15, 2014	Best Actor	Jake Gyllenhaal	Won	
St. Louis Film Critics Association	December 15, 2014	Best Art Direction	Nightcrawler	Nominated	
St. Louis Film Critics Association	December 15, 2014	Best Cinematography	Robert Elswit	Nominated	
St. Louis Film Critics Association	December 15, 2014	Best Original Screenplay	Dan Gilroy	Nominated	
Toronto Film Critics Association	December 15, 2014	Best Actor	Jake Gyllenhaal	Nominated	
Toronto Film Critics Association	December 15, 2014	Best First Feature	Dan Gilroy	Nominated	
Vancouver Film Critics Circle	January 5, 2015	Best Actor	Jake Gyllenhaal	Won	
Writers Guild of America Awards	February 14, 2015	Best Original Screenplay	Dan Gilroy	Nominated	

== See also ==
- 2014 in film
