= Boston Society of Film Critics Awards 2014 =

Annual US film awards ceremony

35th BSFC Awards

December 7, 2014

Best Film:
Boyhood

The 35th Boston Society of Film Critics Awards, honoring the best in filmmaking in 2014, were given on December 7, 2014.

== Winners ==
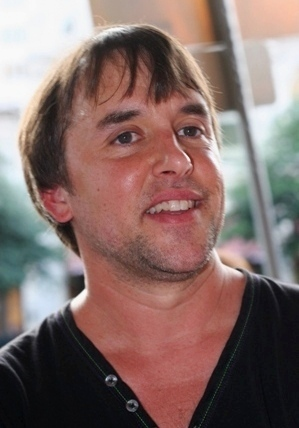
Richard Linklater, Best Director winner

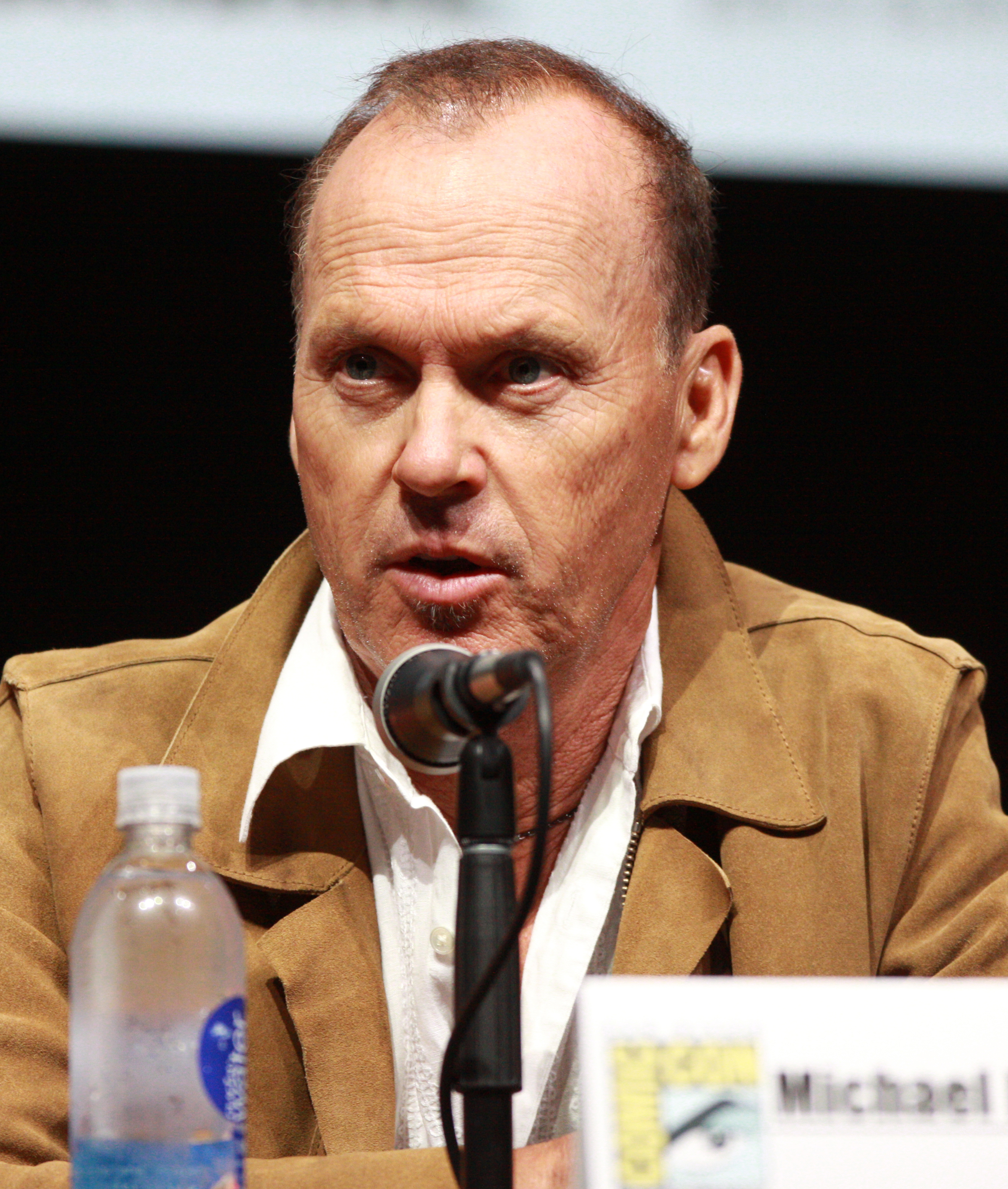
Michael Keaton, Best Actor winner

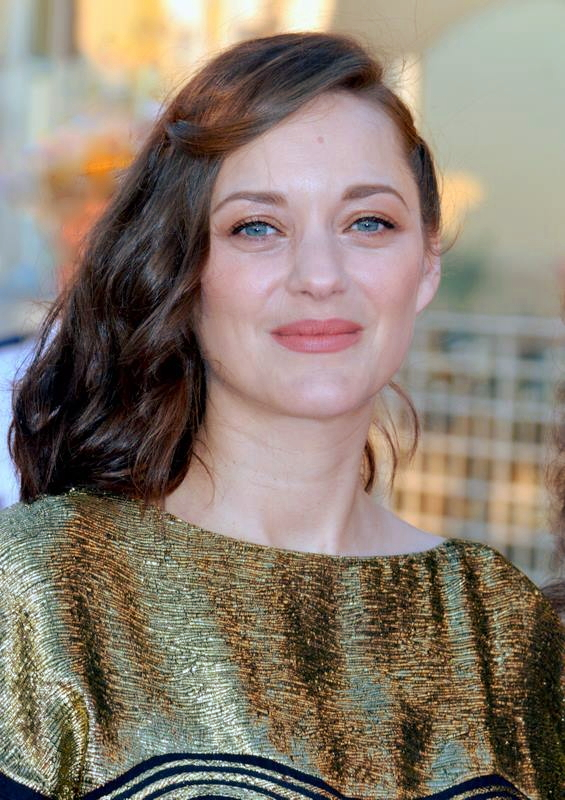
Marion Cotillard, Best Actress winner

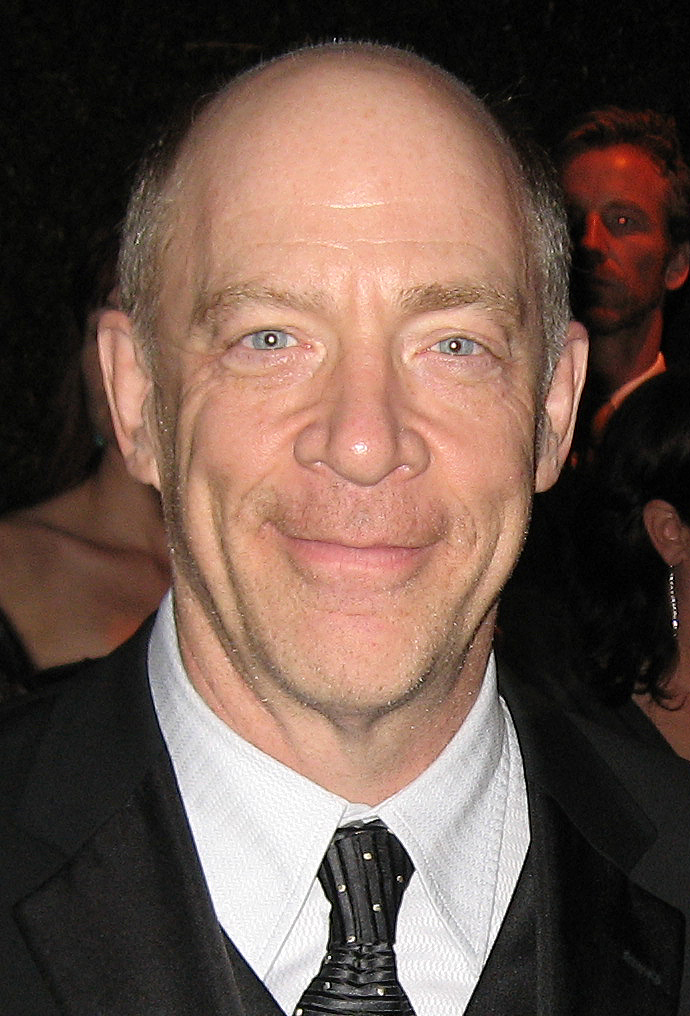
J. K. Simmons, Best Supporting Actor winner

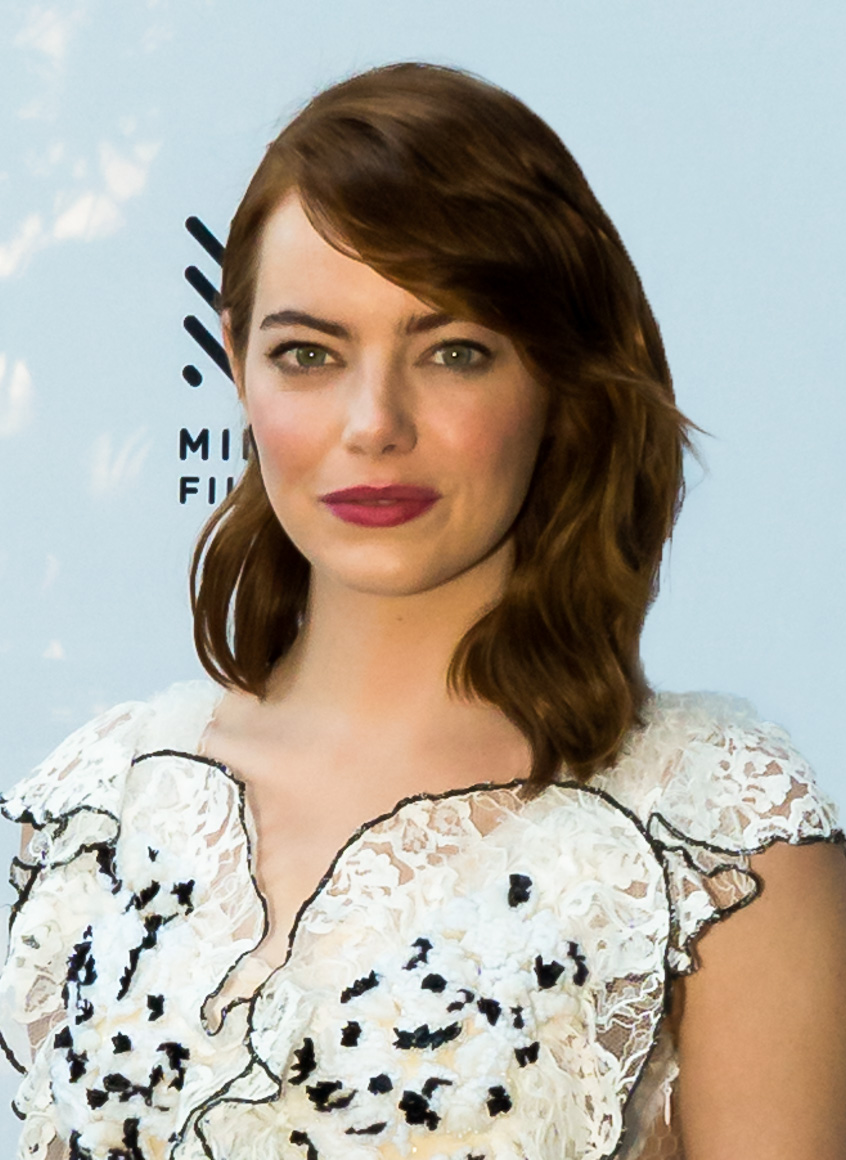
Emma Stone, Best Supporting Actress winner

- Best Film:
  - Boyhood
  - Runner-up: Birdman
- Best Actor:
  - Michael Keaton – Birdman
  - Runner-up: Timothy Spall – Mr. Turner
- Best Actress:
  - Marion Cotillard – Two Days, One Night and The Immigrant
  - Runner-up: Hilary Swank – The Homesman
- Best Supporting Actor:
  - J. K. Simmons – Whiplash
  - Runners-up: Edward Norton – Birdman
- Best Supporting Actress:
  - Emma Stone – Birdman
  - Runner-up: Laura Dern – Wild
- Best Director:
  - Richard Linklater – Boyhood
  - Runner-up: Clint Eastwood – American Sniper
- Best Screenplay:
  - Alejandro G. Iñárritu – Birdman (TIE)
  - Richard Linklater – Boyhood (TIE)
  - Runner-up: Mike Leigh – Mr. Turner
- Best Cinematography:
  - Emmanuel Lubezki – Birdman
  - Runner-up: Dick Pope – Mr. Turner
- Best Foreign Language Film:
  - Two Days, One Night
  - Runner-up: Ida
- Best Documentary:
  - Citizenfour
  - Runner-up: Jodorowsky's Dune
- Best Animated Film:
  - The Tale of the Princess Kaguya
  - Runner-up: The Lego Movie
- Best Editing:
  - Sandra Adair – Boyhood
  - Runner-up: Joel Cox and Gary Roach – American Sniper
- Best New Filmmaker:
  - Dan Gilroy – Nightcrawler
  - Runner-up: Gillian Robespierre – Obvious Child
- Best Ensemble Cast:
  - Boyhood
  - Runner-up: Birdman
- Best Use of Music in a Film:
  - Inherent Vice
  - Runner-up: Whiplash
