= Behemoth! =

2026 American film by Tony Gilroy

- Theatrical release poster
- Directed by: Tony Gilroy
- Written by: Tony Gilroy
- Produced by: Tony Gilroy; Sanne Wohlenberg; John Gilroy
- Starring: Pedro Pascal; Olivia Wilde; Will Arnett
- Cinematography: Damián García
- Edited by: John Gilroy
- Music by: The Behemoth! Collective (Note: In alphabetical order: Michael Abels, Emily Bear, Lukas Frank, Michael Giacchino, James Newton Howard, Henry Jackman, Nami Melumad, Brandon Roberts, Alan Silvestri)
- Distributed by: Searchlight Pictures
- Release dates: October 2, 2026 (NYFF); December 4, 2026 (United States)
- Running time: 127 minutes
- Country: United States
- Language: English
- Budget: $36 million

Behemoth! is a 2026 American comedy-drama film written and directed by Tony Gilroy. It stars Pedro Pascal, Olivia Wilde, Eva Victor, and Will Arnett. It follows a renowned, prolific cellist and session musician who returns to Los Angeles to record film scores when he begins to have an existential crisis, forcing him to reflect on his past.

The film premiered at the 64th New York Film Festival on October 2, 2026, and received positive reviews from critics for Pascal's performance, Gilroy's direction, and the musical score but received criticism for its writing and structure. It is scheduled to be released in the United States by Searchlight Pictures on December 4, 2026.

== Cast ==
- Pedro Pascal as Alex Serian, a renowned, prolific cellist and session musician
- Olivia Wilde as Carol Spedding, Alex's ex-girlfriend
- Eva Victor as Nadia Hynes, Alex's colleague and former lover
- Will Arnett as Andy Serian, Alex's brother
- JoBeth Williams as Ginnie Serian, Alex's mother
- Hank Azaria as Peter Serian, Alex's father
- Alexa Swinton as Viviana
- Kaya Ralls as Bronte
- Erik Griffin as Bobby Royster
- Margarita Levieva as Marika
- Matthew Lillard as Dennis Glenn
- Zlatko Buric as Milos Riga
- Thomas Kretschmann as Timo
- Stephanie Sigman as Toya
- Barry Livingston as Musician #5
- Adam Rose as Husband

== Production ==
It was announced in March 2025 that Tony Gilroy was to write and direct the film, with Oscar Isaac attached to star. However, Isaac had exited the project by August, with Pedro Pascal in negotiations to replace him. Searchlight Pictures acquired the project. Pascal was confirmed in October, alongside David Harbour, Eva Victor and Olivia Wilde joining the cast, with principal photography beginning on October 27, 2025 in Los Angeles, and wrapping on January 23, 2026. Damián García was confirmed to be the film's cinematographer that same day. In November, it was announced that Matthew Lillard, Alexa Swinton, and Margarita Levieva would join the cast. In January 2026, Harbour exited the film to rest due to being overwhelmed by the final season of Stranger Things, with Will Arnett cast to take his place. Erik Griffin and Adam Rose later joined the cast.

=== Music ===
Gilroy worked with nine different composers who contributed to the score. In January 2026, it was reported that James Newton Howard and Alan Silvestri were scoring the film. Howard had previously scored Gilroy's previous directorial efforts; Michael Clayton (2007), Duplicity (2009), and The Bourne Legacy (2012). In February, Gilroy stated in an interview that Brandon Roberts, who had previously worked with Gilroy on the second season of Andor, would also contribute to the film's soundtrack. Howard, Silvestri and Roberts are three of nine musicians working on the score. Michael Abels, Emily Bear, Lukas Frank, Michael Giacchino, Henry Jackman, and Nami Melumad would be revealed as the other six composers in July. The protagonist plays the cello for film scores, and Gilroy wanted different composers to score the scenes for each film on which he works.

== Release ==
Behemoth! had its world premiere on October 2, 2026, as the Centerpiece selection of the 64th New York Film Festival. It was scheduled to screen at the 62nd Chicago International Film Festival, and the 15th Montclair Film Festival as the closing film on October 25, and in the Gala section of the 39th Tokyo International Film Festival on October 28, 2026.

It is scheduled to be released in the United States on December 4, 2026.

== Reception ==
=== Critical response ===
On the review aggregator website Rotten Tomatoes, 81% of 59 critics' reviews are positive, with an average rating of 7.2/10. Metacritic, which uses a weighted average, assigned the film a score of 72 out of 100, based on 21 critics, indicating "generally favorable" reviews.

TheWrap's Zachary Lee declared the film "a love letter not just to film music, but to the complicated and passionate musicians who bring it to life". David Ehrlich of IndieWire gave the film a 'B+' rating, pointing out that it is a "much slippier and more elegant thing than the scale implied by its title." David Rooney of The Hollywood Reporter found the film to be an "odd duck, alternately intriguing and frustrating", as well as "adagio when it needs to be agitato."

Nikki Baughan of ScreenDaily commended Pascal's "terrific performance as a tortured creative soul", but lamented how "the narrative often succumbs to cliché and proves too fragmented to make a lasting emotional impact." Owen Myers of The Guardian rated the film 2 out of 5 stars, assessing that the film "doesn't have the juice" to pull off a plot-free character study.

=== Accolades ===
Award	Date of ceremony	Category	Nominee(s)	Result	Ref.
Hollywood Music in Media Awards	November 18, 2026	Best Original Score – Feature Film	The Behemoth! Collective	Nominated	
Hollywood Music in Media Awards	November 18, 2026	Best Original Song – Feature Film	"Your God Is Sleeping" – Lukas Frank	Nominated	
Hollywood Music in Media Awards	November 18, 2026	Music Themed Film, Biopic or Musical	Behemoth!	Won	
