= Velvet Buzzsaw =

2019 film directed by Dan Gilroy

- Official poster
- Directed by: Dan Gilroy
- Written by: Dan Gilroy
- Produced by: Jennifer Fox
- Starring: Jake Gyllenhaal; Rene Russo; Toni Collette; Zawe Ashton; Tom Sturridge; Natalia Dyer; Daveed Diggs; Billy Magnussen; John Malkovich
- Cinematography: Robert Elswit
- Edited by: John Gilroy
- Music by: Marco Beltrami; Buck Sanders
- Production company: Netflix
- Distributed by: Netflix
- Release dates: January 27, 2019 (Sundance); February 1, 2019 (United States)
- Running time: 114 minutes
- Country: United States
- Language: English
- Budget: $21.2 million

Velvet Buzzsaw is a 2019 American satirical black comedy supernatural horror film directed and written by Dan Gilroy and starring Jake Gyllenhaal, Zawe Ashton, Rene Russo, Toni Collette, Daveed Diggs, Tom Sturridge, Natalia Dyer, Billy Magnussen, and John Malkovich. The film had its world premiere at the 2019 Sundance Film Festival on January 27.

== Plot ==
In Miami, art critic Morf Vandewalt attends an art exhibition alongside his friend Josephina, who works for Rhodora Haze, owner of the Haze Gallery and formerly a member of the punk rock band Velvet Buzzsaw. Unfulfilled in his love life with his boyfriend Ed, Morf starts a sexual relationship with Josephina.

Returning to Los Angeles, Josephina finds a dead man named Vetril Dease in her apartment building and enters his home to discover a myriad of paintings, some of which are partially destroyed. Josephina steals the paintings to show Morf and Rhodora, who become fascinated with Dease. Rhodora decides to exhibit several of Dease's pieces in her gallery, which proves to be a great success. The artworks also enchant Gretchen, Morf's art curator friend; Piers, a former artist for the Haze Gallery; and Damrish, an up-and-coming artist.

To ensure the rarity of the paintings, Rhodora orders gallery worker Bryson to transport half of them to storage. En route, a painting catches fire from his cigarette ash and burns him, causing him to crash into a seemingly abandoned gas station. After he heads inside to clean the burns, Bryson is dragged into a painting by a group of monkey mechanics. Outside, his truck catches fire and burns the remaining Dease paintings.

Researching Dease, Morf discovers he suffered from an abusive childhood that culminated in the murder of his father, after which he was sent to a psychiatric hospital for human experimentation, adding to his mental illness. Jon Dondon, a rival art gallery owner, hires a private investigator to uncover the same story. He attempts to reveal Dease's story to the press but is murdered when a mysterious hand hangs him by his scarf. Coco, Rhodora's former assistant who had just begun working for Jon, discovers his body.

Morf sees a hand in a Dease painting suddenly move; his vision is cleared by his optometrist but he continues to hallucinate. That night, he visits the gallery archivist and learns Dease used blood to make his red-black paints. Rhodora, disappointed with Piers' most recent work, sends him to live at her beach house, instructing him not to return until he has created art solely for himself.

Gretchen negotiates the display of some Dease paintings in the city's museum alongside an interactive piece titled Sphere, which is owned by Gretchen's primary client. Meanwhile, Gretchen also sabotages Josephina's relationship with Morf by telling her he still has feelings for Ed. The night before the exhibit's debut, Gretchen sticks her arm in one of the holes in Sphere which malfunctions and severs her arm, leaving her to bleed out. Coco, who had recently become Gretchen's assistant, finds her body the next morning. Despite, or perhaps because of, Gretchen's death, there is a spike in interest and demand for the Dease exhibit. Morf and Josephina break up after he finds out she is dating Damrish.

Morf's visions worsen, and he urges Rhodora to stop selling Dease's artwork. She ignores him and, knowing he will write a negative article about the artworks, tries to sell them off as fast as she can for tens of millions of dollars. Morf hires the again-unemployed Coco to dispose of the artworks. At a dive bar, Damrish informs Josephina he will not display his art with Haze Gallery, and they break up. Outside, Josephina is mysteriously transported to a gallery where the graffiti paintings melt around her and envelop her skin. As Morf puts the Dease artworks into his storage unit, he discovers a deactivated Hoboman, a robotic art piece he had given a negative critique. Hoboman springs to life and chases Morf into a dead end where it breaks Morf's neck, despite Morf's pleas for mercy.

The next morning, Coco finds Morf's body while Josephina's terrified image is seen on a wall of graffiti. Rhodora, now believing the deaths are connected to Dease, has all the artwork in her house removed. As she sits outside her house, the buzz saw tattoo on her neck begins spinning and slashes her flesh, killing her. On the way to LAX, returning home to Michigan, Coco passes a street vendor selling Dease's paintings for five dollars apiece, having found one of the boxes from Bryson's truck. Meanwhile, Piers draws a pattern of curves on the beach sand as the waves wash over them.

== Cast ==
- Jake Gyllenhaal as Morf Vandewalt
- Rene Russo as Rhodora Haze
- Toni Collette as Gretchen
- Zawe Ashton as Josephina
- Tom Sturridge as Jon Dondon
- Natalia Dyer as "Coco"
- Daveed Diggs as Damrish
- Billy Magnussen as Bryson
- John Malkovich as Piers
- Tyrone Evans Clark as Underground Artist
- Alan Mandell as Vetril Dease
- Mig Macario as Cloudio
- Nitya Vidyasagar as Gita
- Sedale Threatt Jr. as Ed
- Pat Healy as Man From Parlack
- Marco Rodríguez as Ray Ruskinspear
- Pisay Pao as Attorney

== Production ==
Dan Gilroy conceived the project after Superman Lives, a film which he had a hand in developing, was abruptly cancelled because Warner Bros. was not willing to produce it due to the large budget. He felt that he had wasted a year and a half on the film, but he ultimately made peace with the idea while sitting on a beach, a moment that inspired the final scene in the film. In June 2017, it was announced Jake Gyllenhaal and Rene Russo had been cast in Gilroy's then untitled film, with him writing and directing the film, while Jennifer Fox would serve as a producer, and Netflix would produce and distribute the film. Speaking with Business Insider in November 2017, Gilroy teased the project saying:

It's set in the world of contemporary art in Los Angeles, and its got a Robert Altman-like large ensemble cast. It's got a The Player vibe to it. There's a large cast and we're moving around from person to person as we move through this world. The story is being told through these different characters.

In January 2018, it was announced the title was Velvet Buzzsaw. In March 2018, Zawe Ashton, Natalia Dyer, Tom Sturridge, Daveed Diggs, Toni Collette, John Malkovich and Billy Magnussen joined the cast of the film.

Principal photography began on March 5, 2018, in Los Angeles, California.

Marco Beltrami and Buck Sanders composed the score for the film, replacing Gilroy's frequent collaborator James Newton Howard.

Director Dan Gilroy has stated that he wrote the Morf Vandewalt character to be sexually fluid because he "believe[s] that sexuality is far more fluid than society does."

== Release ==
Velvet Buzzsaw had its world premiere at the Sundance Film Festival on January 27, 2019. It was released by Netflix on February 1, 2019.

== Reception ==
Rotten Tomatoes reports an approval rating of 61% based on 198 reviews, and an average rating of 6.1/10. The website's critical consensus reads: "If you only watch one art-world satire with horror overtones this year — or most others — it should probably be Velvet Buzzsaw." On Metacritic, the film has a weighted average score of 61 out of 100 based on 29 critics, indicating "generally favorable reviews".

Brian Tallerico of RogerEbert.com gave the film two and a half out of four stars, writing: "It's a wildly inconsistent film, sometimes disappointingly clunky and as superficial as the world it's mocking, but it's also an ambitious piece of work with unforgettable imagery and an ace ensemble." Emily Yoshida of Vulture wrote: "Writer and director Dan Gilroy is drawing from the same well of a bitter, morally compromised Los Angeles that he did for 2014's Nightcrawler, but Velvet Buzzsaw, as gleaming and sun-drenched as Nightcrawler is dark, is even more of an invective, and even more operatically heightened." Peter Debruge of Variety called it "[Gilroy's] most cynical movie yet, with most of the venom concentrated in the character of the critic." David Ehrlich of IndieWire gave the film a grade of C, writing "Gilroy's film needed to be 60% better or 20% worse in order to transcend the forgettable silliness of its existence, but it could stand the test of time as a lasting monument to the idea that our own personal taste is the only real thing we ever had."
