= Jennifer Fox (film producer) =

American film producer

- Fox in 2026
- Occupation: Film producer

Jennifer Fox is an American film producer. From 2001 to 2007, she was president of Section Eight Productions; before that she was Vice President of Production at Universal Pictures. Fox was nominated for an Oscar in 2008 for her production work in Michael Clayton.

== Life and career ==
While attending New York University, Fox worked as a reader of film materials for several in New York-based production companies, including American Playhouse. In 1997, she was appointed head of the development department at Universal. Two years later, she moved to the vice president of the company and supervised feature film production. One of the first films created under her leadership was Steven Soderbergh's 2000 environmental drama Erin Brockovich, with Julia Roberts in the Oscar-winning title role.

In 2001, Fox became head of Section Eight Productions, the production company founded by Steven Soderbergh and George Clooney in 2000. During Fox's tenure, the company produced Ocean's Eleven, Welcome to Collinwood, Full Frontal, Far from Heaven, Insomnia, Confessions of a Dangerous Mind, Ocean's Twelve, The Good German, and Ocean's Thirteen. Furthermore, she was involved at this time in the comedy Out of Sight by Soderbergh with George Clooney and Jennifer Lopez.

In 2004, Fox first appeared as an executive producer with the detective film Criminal, starring John C. Reilly, Diego Luna and Maggie Gyllenhaal. Afterwards, she worked on the 2005 mystery drama The Jacket, starring Adrien Brody and Keira Knightley. In the same year, she also executive produced the George Clooney dramas Good Night, and Good Luck and Syriana and Rob Reiner's romantic comedy Rumor Has It with Jennifer Aniston.

For the legal thriller Michael Clayton (2007), Fox was credited as producer, together with George Clooney, Kerry Orent, Sydney Pollack, Steve Samuels and Steven Soderbergh. Fox, Pollack and Orent were nominated for an Oscar in the Best Picture category, but lost to Scott Rudin and the Coen Brothers for No Country for Old Men.

In 2009, Fox produced the romantic thriller Duplicity, with Julia Roberts in the title role, and the crime drama The Informant!, by Steven Soderbergh starring Matt Damon. She also produced the drama We Need to Talk About Kevin in which Tilda Swinton plays a mother who is struggling to build a relationship with her child. In 2012, she again worked with Tony Gilroy (they had previously collaborated on Michael Clayton and Duplicity), this time on the fourth installment of the Bourne film series, The Bourne Legacy. She also worked with Dan Gilroy on the 2014 thriller Nightcrawler, who made his directorial debut with this film, starring Jake Gyllenhaal and Rene Russo.

== Filmography ==
She was a producer in all films unless otherwise noted.

=== Film ===
| Year | Film | Credit |
|---|---|---|
| 2004 | Criminal | Executive producer |
| 2005 | The Jacket | Executive producer |
| 2005 | Good Night, and Good Luck | Executive producer |
| 2005 | Syriana | Executive producer |
| 2005 | Rumor Has It | Executive producer |
| 2006 | A Scanner Darkly | Executive producer |
| 2006 | Pu-239 | Executive producer |
| 2007 | Michael Clayton | |
| 2009 | Duplicity | |
| 2009 | The Informant! | |
| 2011 | We Need to Talk About Kevin | |
| 2012 | The Bourne Legacy | Executive producer |
| 2014 | Nightcrawler | |
| 2017 | Roman J. Israel, Esq. | |
| 2019 | The Report | |
| 2019 | Velvet Buzzsaw | |
| 2021 | The Last Duel | |
| 2025 | Magazine Dreams | |
| 2026 | Artificial | |

Thanks

| Year | Film | Role |
|---|---|---|
| 2007 | Wind Chill | Special thanks |

=== Television ===
Thanks

| Year | Title | Role | Notes |
|---|---|---|---|
| 2018 | Hammerhead | Special thanks | Television film |

== Awards and nominations ==
- Michael Clayton (2007)
  - Academy Awards Best Picture nomination (shared with Sydney Pollack and Kerry Orent)
  - AFI Award "Film of the Year" winner (shared with Sydney Pollack, Steve Samuels and Kerry Orent)
  - PGA Award "Outstanding producer of movies" nomination (shared with Kerry Orent and Sydney Pollack)
- We Need to Talk About Kevin (2011)
  - BAFTA Award "Alexander Korda Award for Best British Film" nomination (shared with Lynne Ramsay, Luc Roeg, Robert Salerno, and Rory Stewart Kinnear)
  - AACTA Awards "Best Film" nomination (shared with Luc Roeg and Robert Salerno)
- Nightcrawler (2014)
  - Awards Circuit Community Awards (ACCA) "Best Film" nomination (shared with Tony Gilroy, Jake Gyllenhaal, David Lancaster, Michel Litvak)
  - Gotham Award "Audience Award" nomination (shared with Dan Gilroy, David Lancaster, Jake Gyllenhaal, Michel Litvak and Tony Gilroy)
  - AFI Award "Film of the Year" winner (shared with Michel Litvak, Jake Gyllenhaal, David Lancaster, Tony Gilroy)
  - Independent Spirit Award "Best First Feature" winner (shared with Dan Gilroy, Tony Gilroy, Jake Gyllenhaal, David Lancaster, Michael Litvak)
  - Online Film & Television Association Award "Best Film" nomination (shared with Tony Gilroy, Michel Litvak, Jake Gyllenhaal and David Lancaster)
  - PGA Award "Outstanding Producer of Movies" nomination (shared with Tony Gilroy)
