= San Diego Film Critics Society Awards 2014 =

Annual US film awards ceremony

19th SDFCS Awards

December 15, 2014

Best Film:
Nightcrawler

Best Director:
Dan Gilroy
Nightcrawler

The 19th San Diego Film Critics Society Awards were announced on December 15, 2014.

== Winners and nominees ==
=== Best Film ===
Nightcrawler

- Boyhood
- Gone Girl
- The Grand Budapest Hotel
- Selma
- The Theory of Everything

=== Best Director ===
Dan Gilroy – Nightcrawler

- Wes Anderson – The Grand Budapest Hotel
- David Fincher – Gone Girl
- Alejandro G. Iñárritu – Birdman
- Richard Linklater – Boyhood

=== Best Actor ===
Jake Gyllenhaal – Nightcrawler

- Ralph Fiennes – The Grand Budapest Hotel
- Brendan Gleeson – Calvary
- Tom Hardy – Locke
- Michael Keaton – Birdman
- Eddie Redmayne – The Theory of Everything

=== Best Actress ===
Marion Cotillard – Two Days, One Night

- Felicity Jones – The Theory of Everything
- Rosamund Pike – Gone Girl
- Hilary Swank – The Homesman
- Mia Wasikowska – Tracks

=== Best Supporting Actor ===
Mark Ruffalo – Foxcatcher

- Riz Ahmed – Nightcrawler
- Ethan Hawke – Boyhood
- Edward Norton – Birdman
- J. K. Simmons – Whiplash

=== Best Supporting Actress ===
Rene Russo – Nightcrawler

- Patricia Arquette – Boyhood
- Carrie Coon – Gone Girl
- Keira Knightley – The Imitation Game
- Emma Stone – Birdman

=== Best Original Screenplay ===
Nightcrawler – Dan Gilroy

- Birdman – Alejandro G. Iñárritu, Nicolás Giacobone, Alexander Dinelaris Jr., and Armando Bo
- Boyhood – Richard Linklater
- The Grand Budapest Hotel – Wes Anderson and Hugo Guinness
- Locke – Steven Knight

=== Best Adapted Screenplay ===
Gone Girl – Gillian Flynn

- The Fault in Our Stars – Scott Neustadter and Michael H. Weber
- The Theory of Everything – Anthony McCarten
- Unbroken – Joel Coen, Ethan Coen, William Nicholson, and Richard LaGravenese
- Wild – Nick Hornby

=== Best Animated Film ===
The Boxtrolls

- Big Hero 6
- How to Train Your Dragon 2
- The Lego Movie
- The Nut Job

=== Best Documentary ===
Citizenfour

- Elaine Stritch: Shoot Me
- Glen Campbell: I'll Be Me
- Last Days in Vietnam
- Life Itself

=== Best Foreign Language Film ===
Force Majeure • Sweden

- Heli • Mexico
- Ida • Denmark / Poland
- Two Days, One Night • Belgium
- Venus in Fur • France

=== Best Cinematography ===
Nightcrawler – Robert Elswit

- Force Majeure – Fredrik Wenzel
- Gone Girl – Jeff Cronenweth
- Interstellar – Hoyte van Hoytema
- Unbroken – Roger Deakins

=== Best Editing ===
Edge of Tomorrow – James Herbert and Laura Jennings

- Boyhood – Sandra Adair
- Gone Girl – Kirk Baxter
- The Grand Budapest Hotel – Barney Pilling
- Nightcrawler – John Gilroy

=== Best Production Design ===
The Grand Budapest Hotel – Adam Stockhausen and Anna Pinnock

- The Imitation Game – Maria Djurkovic
- Interstellar – Nathan Crawley
- Into the Woods – Dennis Gassner and Anna Pinnock
- The Theory of Everything – John Paul Kelly

=== Best Score ===
Nightcrawler – James Newton Howard

- Birdman – Antonio Sánchez
- Gone Girl – Trent Reznor and Atticus Ross
- The Grand Budapest Hotel – Alexandre Desplat
- The Imitation Game – Alexandre Desplat

=== Best Ensemble ===
Birdman

- Boyhood
- The Grand Budapest Hotel
- The Imitation Game
- Selma

=== Best Body of Work ===
Willem Dafoe for The Fault in Our Stars, The Grand Budapest Hotel, John Wick, A Most Wanted Man, and Nymphomaniac
