= The Homesman =

2014 film by Tommy Lee Jones

- Theatrical release poster
- Directed by: Tommy Lee Jones
- Screenplay by: Tommy Lee Jones; Kieran Fitzgerald; Wesley Oliver
- Based on: The Homesman by Glendon Swarthout
- Produced by: Peter M. Brant; Brian Kennedy; Luc Besson
- Starring: Tommy Lee Jones; Hilary Swank; Meryl Streep
- Cinematography: Rodrigo Prieto
- Edited by: Roberto Silvi
- Music by: Marco Beltrami
- Production companies: EuropaCorp; Ithaca; The Javelina Film Company
- Distributed by: Roadside Attractions; Saban Films (United States); EuropaCorp Distribution (France)
- Release dates: May 18, 2014 (Cannes); November 14, 2014 (United States)
- Running time: 123 minutes
- Countries: United States; France
- Language: English
- Budget: $16 million
- Box office: $8.2 million

The Homesman is a 2014 Western historical drama film set in the 1850s' Great Plains and directed by Tommy Lee Jones and written by Jones, Kieran Fitzgerald, and Wesley Oliver based on the 1988 novel by Glendon Swarthout. The film stars Jones, Hilary Swank, Meryl Streep, Miranda Otto and Tim Blake Nelson.

The Homesman competed for the Palme d'Or in the main competition section at the 2014 Cannes Film Festival and got a North American limited release on November 14, 2014, by Roadside Attractions. The Homesman has received mostly positive reviews from critics. Rotten Tomatoes gave the film a rating of 81%.

The title refers to the task of taking emigrants back home, which was typically a man's job.

== Plot ==
In 1854, Mary Bee Cuddy, a 31-year-old unmarried teacher from New York, came to the Great Plains for more opportunities. In the small farming community of Loup in the Nebraska Territory she owns sizable property and is financially secure. Though she seems strong and independent, she has depression and feels isolated. She invites her neighbor Bob Giffen for dinner and proposes marriage, but he turns her down, saying she is plain-looking and too bossy. He leaves to find a wife back east.

After a harsh winter, three women in the community show signs of prairie madness. Arabella Sours has lost three children to diphtheria, and Gro Svendsen, a Danish immigrant in an abusive marriage, breaks down after her mother dies. Theoline Belknap kills her own child after a poor harvest. Reverend Dowd calls upon one of their husbands to escort the women east to the Lady's Aid Society Methodist Church in Hebron, Iowa, which cares for the mentally ill. Theoline's husband Vester refuses to participate in the lottery to decide who will escort the women; Cuddy takes his place, and the lot falls on her.

While preparing for the trip, Cuddy encounters George Briggs, a claim jumper, who has been left on horseback with a noose around his neck for stealing Bob Giffen's land in his absence. Scared to make the trip alone, she frees him, on the condition that he helps escort the women. He immediately casts doubt on the job and insists he be free to abandon her at any time. To persuade him, Cuddy tells him she will mail $300 to await his arrival in Iowa, but she secretly keeps it with her.

The group crosses paths with hostile Pawnee. Briggs bribes them by giving up Cuddy's horse. Later, Arabella is kidnapped. Briggs gives chase, and the two men scuffle before Arabella kills her kidnapper. Eventually, the group reaches the grave of an 11-year-old girl which has been dug up by wolves. Cuddy insists they stop and restore it, but Briggs vows to push on, so Cuddy stays behind, saying she will catch up with them. After restoring the grave, Cuddy sets out on horseback but loses her way. After riding all night she finds herself back at the grave and realizes she has gone in a circle.

Finally catching up to Briggs after another night of riding, Cuddy, distraught over having to wander the prairie, suggests they marry. Briggs declines, saying he "ain't no farmer". On the same night, Cuddy asks Briggs to sleep with her, which he does reluctantly. The next morning, Briggs finds Cuddy dead, having hanged herself. Briggs chastises Sours, Belknap, and Svendsen, blaming their illness for Cuddy's death as he buries her body. He finds the $300, takes a horse, and abandons the three women. However, the trio follows him on foot, and Arabella almost drowns while chasing him across a river. Briggs saves her and decides to go on to Iowa.

They reach an empty hotel. The proprietor, Irishman Aloysius Duffy, says they have no rooms available as a group of 16 investors is expected shortly, and the women would sour the establishment. Briggs lashes out at Duffy, whose men pull out their guns, resulting in a brief stand-off. Briggs leaves, but returns that night alone on horseback. He sends away the young cook, sets the hotel on fire, and shoots Duffy in the foot. Briggs takes a suckling pig to feed himself and the women and leaves all inside the hotel to be burned alive.

Briggs reaches Hebron, passing the women into the care of Altha Carter, the reverend's wife. He informs her of Cuddy's death but does not disclose the cause. Feeling guilty about rejecting her marriage proposal, he has a wooden slab engraved with her name, planning to mark her grave with it. He discovers that his $300 is worthless, the Bank of Loup having failed since they left. He gives a pair of shoes to Tabitha Hutchinson, a hard-working young maid at the hotel where he is staying, and then proposes to her, after advising her not to marry some young man going west, but to stay in town. She replies, "Maybe." He then boards the open-decked river ferry heading back west, where he sings a rowdy song with two musicians on deck. Briggs fires his pistol and shouts at people on the pier who complain about the noise. Eventually, one of the bargemen kicks Cuddy's wooden grave marker off the edge of the deck into the river; unnoticed by Briggs, it floats away.

== Cast ==
- Tommy Lee Jones as George Briggs
- Hilary Swank as Mary Bee Cuddy
- Grace Gummer as Arabella Sours
- Miranda Otto as Theoline Belknap
- Sonja Richter as Gro Svendsen
- Meryl Streep as Altha Carter
- John Lithgow as Reverend Dowd
- James Spader as Aloysius Duffy
- Hailee Steinfeld as Tabitha Hutchinson
- Caroline Lagerfelt as Netti Nordstog
- Tim Blake Nelson as The Freighter
- Jesse Plemons as Garn Sours
- William Fichtner as Vester Belknap
- David Dencik as Thor Svendsen
- Barry Corbin as Buster Shaver
- Evan Jones as Bob Giffen
- Jo Harvey Allen as Mrs. Polhemus
- Karen Jones as Mrs. Linens

== Themes ==
The film shows the unsparingly harsh and difficult life of early settlers of the Great Plains in the American West in the 1850s. The Homesman has been called a "feminist western". A critic and interview with Hilary Swank noted that the lives of women during this time are rarely explored, as opposed to men.

== Music ==
Critics have praised Marco Beltrami's music. The score emphasizes the use of wind sounds to show how early settlers had to endure the constant wind without solid shelter, which imitates the character themes of being mentally undone by the elements that surround them. Beltrami used inventive measures such as using a "wind piano" and recording outside. Beltrami said the goal was to take the "warmth" out of the sound to dissipate the air.

== Release ==
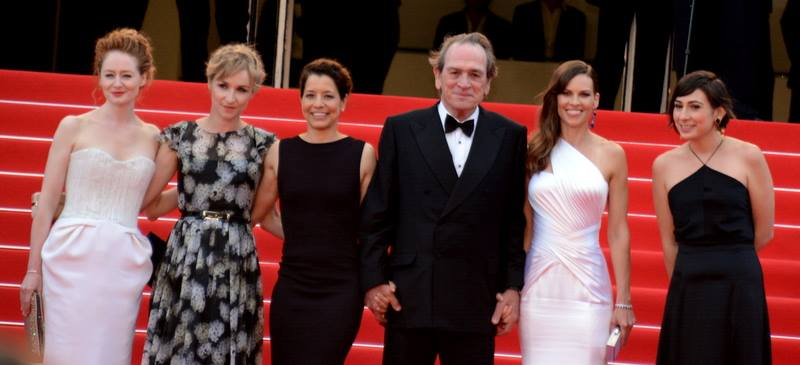
Director and cast at the 2014 Cannes Film Festival

The Homesman premiered on May 18, 2014, in competition at the 2014 Cannes Film Festival. The film was also screened at the 2014 Telluride Film Festival, and the AFI Film Festival, among others. Saban Films bought the film after Cannes for release, with Roadside Attractions joining to distribute the film in the U.S. EuropaCorp distributed the film abroad. The film had a limited release in the United States on November 7, 2014.

== Critical response ==
The Homesman received mostly positive reviews from critics, with particulars standing out being Swank's performance, the cinematography, score, and costumes. Rotten Tomatoes gave the film an 81% approval rating based on 148 reviews, with a rating average of 7.1/10. The site's consensus: "A squarely traditional yet somewhat progressive Western, The Homesman adds another absorbing entry to Tommy Lee Jones' directorial résumé". Metacritic gives the film a score of 68/100 based on 43 critics, indicating generally favorable reviews.

Betsy Sharkey of the Los Angeles Times wrote: "Swank and Jones, in particular, are a very good odd couple, playing saint and sinner, sometimes reversing the roles. What the directing side of Jones does best is to cede the spotlight to his star. He builds a strong platform for Swank to take on yet another woman who refuses to be bound by gender conventions".

Andrew O'Hehir of Salon wrote: "Swank gives a magnificent performance as a woman whose calm and capable exterior cannot completely conceal her worsening desperation. In its unsentimental poetry, its stripped-down imagery and its unforgettable lead performances, 'The Homesman' is a ruthless Western classic ... cinematographer Rodrigo Prieto’s harsh, horizontal landscapes—like the haunting, unsettling score by Marco Beltrami—are anything but picturesque and reassuring, and serve to support a strikingly bleak portrait of life on the 19th-century American frontier".

In contrast, Claudia Puig of USA Today wrote: "Set on the Great Plains in the mid-1800s, 'The Homesman' aims for a story that's poignant and told sparely, but comes across as mawkish, tedious and self-indulgent. Swank brings a gravitas to her character that is undermined when some of her antics are played for laughs. In a 10-minute cameo, Meryl Streep's character is more fully developed than any of the leads' roles. The story attempts to show how hard it was for women in the Old West, but it ends up being Jones' surly show".

== Accolades ==
Year	Award	Category	Recipient(s)	Result
2014	2014 Cannes Film Festival	Palme d'Or	Tommy Lee Jones	Nominated
2014	Phoenix Film Critics Society Awards	Best Actress	Hilary Swank	Nominated
2014	Phoenix Film Critics Society Awards	Best Actor	Tommy Lee Jones	Nominated
2014	Boston Society of Film Critics Awards	Best Actress	Hilary Swank	Runner-up
2014	San Diego Film Critics Society Awards	Best Actress	Hilary Swank	Nominated
2014	Women Film Critics Circle Awards	Best Movie About Women		Nominated
2014	Women Film Critics Circle Awards	Best Male Images in a Movie		Nominated
2014	Women Film Critics Circle Awards	Best Actor	Tommy Lee Jones	Nominated
2014	Women Film Critics Circle Awards	Courage in Acting Award	Hilary Swank	Nominated
2014	Women Film Critics Circle Awards	The Invisible Woman Award	Hilary Swank	Nominated
2014	Women Film Critics Circle Awards	Best Ensemble (Women's Work)		Won
2014	World Soundtrack Awards	Film Composer of The Year	Marco Beltrami	Nominated
2014	International Film Music Critics Association	Composer of the Year	Marco Beltrami	Nominated
2014	International Film Music Critics Association	Best Original Score for a Drama	Marco Beltrami	Won
2015	Western Heritage Award	Outstanding Theatrical Motion Picture	The Javelina Film Company and Itacha Films	Won
2015	Spur Award	Best Western Drama Script	Tommy Lee Jones, Kieran Fitzgerald, Wesley A. Oliver	Won
2015	Gradiva Award (NAAP)	Best Film Director	Tommy Lee Jones	Nominated
