= Michael Clayton =

2007 film by Tony Gilroy

- Theatrical release poster
- Directed by: Tony Gilroy
- Written by: Tony Gilroy
- Produced by: Sydney Pollack; Steven Samuels; Jennifer Fox; Kerry Orent
- Starring: George Clooney; Tom Wilkinson; Tilda Swinton; Sydney Pollack
- Cinematography: Robert Elswit
- Edited by: John Gilroy
- Music by: James Newton Howard
- Production companies: Samuels Media; Castle Rock Entertainment; Mirage Enterprises; Section Eight Productions
- Distributed by: Warner Bros. Pictures (United States and Canada); Summit Entertainment (International)
- Release dates: August 31, 2007 (Venice); October 5, 2007 (United States)
- Running time: 120 minutes
- Country: United States
- Language: English
- Budget: $21.5 million
- Box office: $93 million

Michael Clayton is a 2007 American legal thriller film written and directed by Tony Gilroy in his directorial debut. It stars George Clooney as lawyer Michael Clayton, who discovers a coverup of criminal wrongdoing by one of his firm's clients. Tom Wilkinson, Tilda Swinton, and Sydney Pollack appear in supporting roles.

The film had its world premiere on August 31, 2007 at the 64th Venice International Film Festival, where it competed for the Golden Lion. It was released in the United States on October 5 and grossed $93 million worldwide. Gilroy's direction and screenplay and the performances of the cast, particularly Swinton, were lauded. Michael Clayton was nominated for seven Academy Awards: Best Picture, Best Director, Best Original Score, Best Original Screenplay, Best Actor for Clooney, Best Supporting Actor for Wilkinson, and Best Supporting Actress for Swinton, which she won.

== Plot ==
Lawyer Michael Clayton is a "fixer" for the prestigious Kenner, Bach, and Ledeen law firm in New York City. One night, Michael attends to a high-profile client in Westchester County. Driving home, Michael sees three horses standing at the top of a hill. As he gets out of his car and approaches them, a bomb detonates in his car behind him.

Four days earlier, Michael is dispatched to deal with a crisis created when Arthur Edens, one of Kenner-Bach's top litigators, suffers a manic episode in the middle of a deposition. Arthur is heading the defense of U-North, an agricultural conglomerate, in a six-year-long, three-billion-dollar class action lawsuit over deaths claimed to be related to a U-North weedkiller, and his outburst has jeopardized U-North's defense. Michael bails Arthur out of jail in Milwaukee and learns Arthur had stopped taking his medication for his manic–depressive disorder. Michael's son Henry speaks with Arthur after Arthur answers Michael's phone. Henry tells Arthur about a chapter in a fantasy book, Realm & Conquest, that concerns the summoning of heroes to their destiny, which Arthur interprets as a sign to fight U-North. Arthur escapes from his hotel room and returns to New York.

Karen Crowder, U-North's general counsel, discovers that Arthur has a confidential U-North memo proving the company knew its weedkiller had the potential to kill people before it went to market, but that the costs of fixing the issue would be too high. U-North CEO Don Jeffries, whose signature is on the memo, puts Karen in contact with two operatives, who follow Arthur and bug his apartment and phone.

Michael approaches Marty Bach, Kenner–Bach's managing partner, requesting a loan to cover a failed investment in a restaurant Michael made with his brother, Timmy. Marty suggests Michael will be rewarded if he can get Arthur back on track, but warns the firm will be finished if he fails. Michael finds Arthur on a Manhattan street and confronts him about a call Michael learned from Marty that Arthur made to Anna Kaiserson, the plaintiff being deposed during his episode, leading Arthur to realize his calls are monitored. Arthur calls his own voicemail at the firm and mocks U-North while suggesting he will go public with the memo. Karen directs the operatives to kill Arthur. The two break into Arthur's apartment, murder him with an injection, and stage the scene as a suicide by drug overdose.

Michael learns of Arthur's death and becomes suspicious when he discovers U-North is suddenly planning a settlement. He discovers that Arthur had booked a flight to New York for Anna, but died before he could pick her up at the airport. He finds Anna and learns that she told no one of her conversations with Arthur, yet Marty somehow knew. Michael breaks into Arthur's apartment, which is sealed as a crime scene. He finds Arthur's dog-eared copy of Realm & Conquest with a copy shop receipt tucked inside. Two police officers soon arrive on a tip from the operatives, who have been trailing Michael. Michael is arrested, but his brother Gene bails him out.

Taking the receipt to the copy shop, Michael discovers that Arthur ordered 3,000 copies of the incriminating memo. Michael goes to Marty, planning to show him the memo and tell him that Arthur was right. Instead, Marty offers Michael the money he requested plus a contract renewal, but insists Michael also sign a non-disclosure agreement covering his knowledge of Kenner-Bach's operations, clients, and cases. Michael accepts the money, gives up pursuing Arthur's lead, and pays off his restaurant debt. That night, during the events depicted at the film's opening, the operatives plant a bomb and GPS tracker in Michael's car and follow him through Westchester. Not knowing that he has stepped out to see the horses on the hill, the operatives detonate his car. Michael hides with Timmy's help.

At a U-North board meeting, Karen proposes that the board approve a lawsuit settlement. Outside the meeting, Michael confronts her alone and goads her into offering him $10 million for his silence. When Karen agrees, Michael reveals he is wearing a wire, with Gene and other NYPD detectives listening. As the police move in, Michael gets into a cab and rides away.

== Cast ==
- George Clooney as Michael Clayton, attorney at Kenner, Bach, and Ledeen
- Tom Wilkinson as Arthur Edens, attorney at Kenner, Bach, and Ledeen
- Tilda Swinton as Karen Crowder, counsel at U-North
- Sydney Pollack as Marty Bach, managing partner at Kenner, Bach, and Ledeen
- Michael O'Keefe as Barry Grissom, attorney at Kenner, Bach, and Ledeen
- Ken Howard as Don Jeffries, U-North's CEO
- Denis O'Hare as Mr. Greer, a wealthy client of the firm who is involved in a hit-and-run
- Sean Cullen as Gene Clayton, Michael's brother, a police detective
- Merritt Wever as Anna Kaiserson, one of the plaintiffs against U-North
- David Lansbury as Timmy Clayton, Michael's brother
- David Zayas as Detective Dalberto
- Robert Prescott as Verne, the principal hit man
- Terry Serpico as Iker, the second hit man
- Bill Raymond as Gabe Zabel

== Production ==
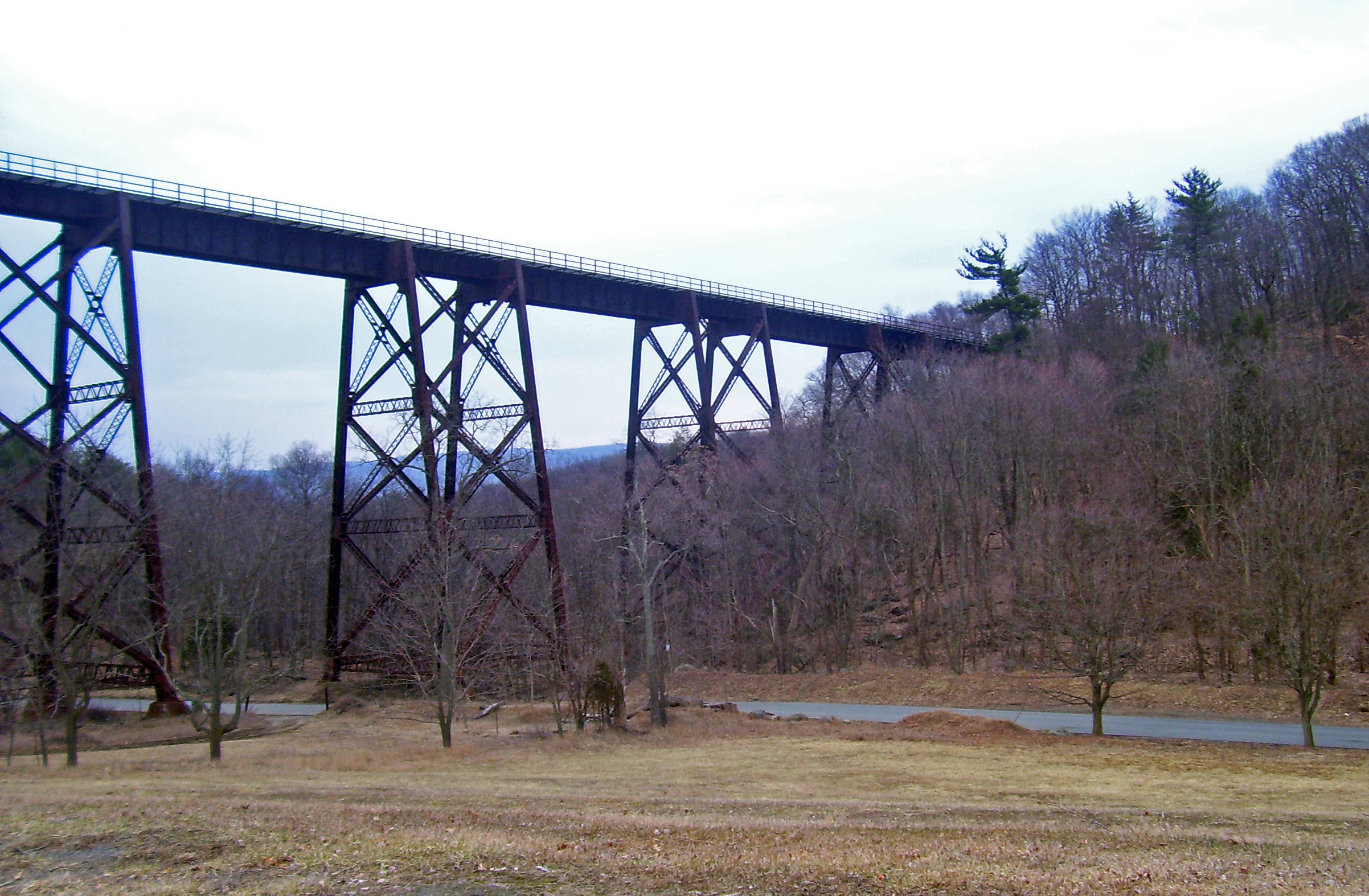
The Moodna Viaduct, where Clayton's car explodes at the beginning of the film

=== Casting ===
Denzel Washington was offered the lead role. He liked the script, but turned the role down due to concern about Gilroy as a first-time director. He later said he regretted the decision.

== Release ==
=== Theatrical ===
Principal photography took place from January 30 to April 7, 2006. The film premiered on August 31, 2007, at the Venice Film Festival. It was shown at the American Films Festival of Deauville on September 2, 2007, and at the Toronto International Film Festival on September 7. It opened in the United Kingdom on September 28, and at the Dubai Film Festival in December. It opened in limited release in the United States on October 5, 2007, and in wide release in the US on October 12. It grossed $10.3 million in the opening week. It was rereleased on January 25, 2008. It grossed $49 million in North America and $92.9 million worldwide.

=== Home media ===
The film was released on DVD and Blu-ray on February 19, 2008, and on HD DVD on March 11, 2008. On November 18, 2026, Tony Gilroy confirmed in an interview with Collider that the film would be receiving a 4K Ultra HD release from The Criterion Collection.

== Critical reception ==
On review aggregator Rotten Tomatoes, the film holds an approval rating of 90% based on 205 reviews, with an average rating of 7.60/10. The website's critical consensus reads: "Michael Clayton is one of the most sharply scripted films of 2007, with an engrossing premise and faultless acting. Director Tony Gilroy succeeds not only in capturing the audience's attention, but holding it until the credits roll." Metacritic assigned the film a weighted average score of 82 out of 100, based on 36 critics, indicating "universal acclaim". Audiences surveyed by CinemaScore gave the film a B on an A+ to F scale.

Owen Gleiberman of Entertainment Weekly gave it an A, saying that it was "better than good, it just about restores your faith". Roger Ebert gave it a full four stars and Richard Roeper named it the best film of the year. It was also Richard Schickel's top film of 2007; he called it "a morally alert, persuasively realistic and increasingly suspenseful melodrama, impeccably acted and handsomely staged by Tony Gilroy". Time wrote, "Michael Clayton is not an exercise in high-tension energy; you'll never confuse its eponymous protagonist with Jason Bourne. But it does have enough of a melodramatic pulse to keep you engaged in its story and, better than that, it is full of plausible characters who are capable of surprising—and surpassing—your expectations". Stanley Kauffmann of The New Republic wrote, "Gilroy's film is distinguished beyond its components by its purpose, its compassion, its interest—increasingly manifest—in the soul".

Michael Clayton appeared on many critics' top ten lists of the best films of 2007. It was also on Time's 2012 list of 10 memorable ending scenes. In 2021, members of Writers Guild of America West (WGAW) and Writers Guild of America, East (WGAE) ranked its screenplay 20th in WGA's 101 Greatest Screenplays of the 21st Century (so far). In 2025, it ranked 93rd on The New York Times's list of "The 100 Best Movies of the 21st Century" and 78th on the "Readers' Choice" edition of the list. In July 2025, it ranked 73rd on Rolling Stone's list of "The 100 Best Movies of the 21st Century". The Ringer's podcast The Big Picture ranked the film 25th on its list of 25 best movies of the 21st Century.

== Accolades ==
Award	Category	Recipient	Result
Academy Awards	Best Picture	Sydney Pollack, Steven Samuels, Jennifer Fox and Kerry Orent	Nominated
Academy Awards	Best Director	Tony Gilroy	Nominated
Academy Awards	Best Actor	George Clooney	Nominated
Academy Awards	Best Supporting Actor	Tom Wilkinson	Nominated
Academy Awards	Best Supporting Actress	Tilda Swinton	Won
Academy Awards	Best Original Screenplay	Tony Gilroy	Nominated
Academy Awards	Best Original Score	James Newton Howard	Nominated
BAFTA Awards	Best Original Screenplay	Tony Gilroy	Nominated
BAFTA Awards	Best Actor	George Clooney	Nominated
BAFTA Awards	Best Supporting Actor	Tom Wilkinson	Nominated
BAFTA Awards	Best Supporting Actress	Tilda Swinton	Won
BAFTA Awards	Best Editing	John Gilroy	Nominated
Golden Globe Awards	Best Motion Picture – Drama		Nominated
Golden Globe Awards	Best Actor – Motion Picture Drama	George Clooney	Nominated
Golden Globe Awards	Best Supporting Actor	Tom Wilkinson	Nominated
Golden Globe Awards	Best Supporting Actress	Tilda Swinton	Nominated
Dallas-Fort Worth Film Critics Association Awards	Best Supporting Actress	Tilda Swinton	Won
Kansas City Film Critics Circle Award	Best Supporting Actress	Tilda Swinton	Won
Vancouver Film Critics Circle Award	Best Supporting Actress	Tilda Swinton	Won
National Board of Review	Best Actor	George Clooney	Won
San Francisco Film Critics Circle	Best Actor	George Clooney	Won
Washington D.C. Area Film Critics Association	Best Actor	George Clooney	Won
Satellite Award	Best Original Screenplay	Tony Gilroy	Nominated
Satellite Award	Best Supporting Actor – Drama	Tom Wilkinson	Won (Note: Tied with Casey Affleck in The Assassination of Jesse James by the Coward Robert Ford)
Satellite Award	Best Supporting Actress – Drama	Tilda Swinton	Nominated
London Film Critics Association	Best British Actor of the year	Tom Wilkinson	Won
Edgar Award	Best Motion Picture Screenplay	Tony Gilroy	Won
Broadcast Film Critics Association Awards	Best Picture		Nominated
Broadcast Film Critics Association Awards	Best Screenplay	Tony Gilroy	Nominated
Broadcast Film Critics Association Awards	Best Actor	George Clooney	Nominated
Broadcast Film Critics Association Awards	Best Supporting Actor	Tom Wilkinson	Nominated
Broadcast Film Critics Association Awards	Best Supporting Actress	Tilda Swinton	Nominated
Chicago Film Critics Association	Best Picture		Nominated
Chicago Film Critics Association	Best Director	Tony Gilroy	Nominated
Chicago Film Critics Association	Best Original Screenplay	Tony Gilroy	Nominated
Chicago Film Critics Association	Best Actor	George Clooney	Nominated
Chicago Film Critics Association	Best Supporting Actor	Tom Wilkinson	Nominated
Chicago Film Critics Association	Best Supporting Actress	Tilda Swinton	Nominated
Chicago Film Critics Association	Most Promising Filmmaker	Tony Gilroy	Nominated
London Film Critics' Circle	Actor of the Year	George Clooney	Nominated
London Film Critics' Circle	British Actor of the Year	Tom Wilkinson	Nominated
London Film Critics' Circle	British Supporting Actress of the Year	Tilda Swinton	Nominated
Screen Actors Guild Awards	Best Male Actor in a Leading Role	George Clooney	Nominated
Screen Actors Guild Awards	Best Male Actor in a Supporting Role	Tom Wilkinson	Nominated
Screen Actors Guild Awards	Best Female Actor in a Supporting Role	Tilda Swinton	Nominated
Venice Film Festival	Golden Lion	Tony Gilroy	Nominated

== Soundtrack ==
Original Motion Picture Soundtrack: Michael Clayton was composed by James Newton Howard and released on September 25, 2007, on the Varèse Sarabande label. It was nominated for an Academy Award for Best Original Score.
