= John Gilroy (film editor) =

American film editor (born 1959)

- Gilroy in 2026
- Born: John Michael Gilroy; June 24, 1959 (age 67); Santa Monica, California, U.S.
- Occupation: Film editor
- Years active: 1984–present
- Children: 1
- Parent(s): Frank D. Gilroy; Ruth Dorothy Gaydos
- Relatives: Dan Gilroy (twin brother); Tony Gilroy (brother)

John Michael Gilroy (born June 24, 1959) is an American film editor whose work includes Michael Clayton, The Bourne Legacy, Warrior, Pacific Rim, Nightcrawler and Suicide Squad.

== Life and career ==
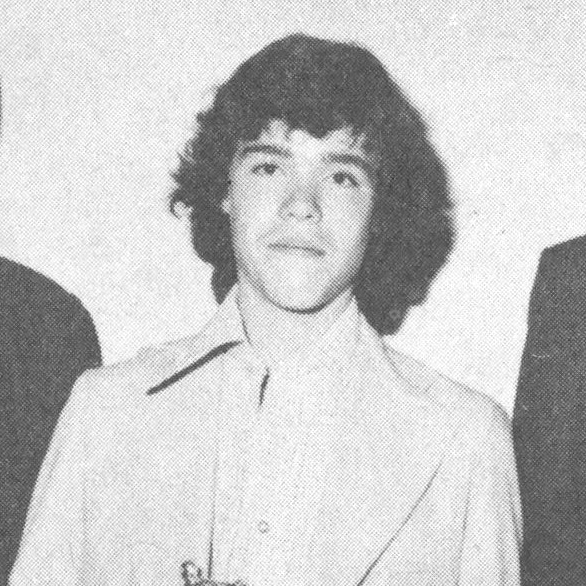
Gilroy as a teenager in 1974

Gilroy was born in 1959 in Santa Monica, California. He is the son of Ruth Dorothy (Gaydos), a sculptor and writer, and Frank D. Gilroy, a filmmaker. He is the twin brother of screenwriter-director Dan Gilroy and the brother of screenwriter-director Tony Gilroy. He has two daughters: Carolyn, born in 1990, and Taylor, born in 1992.

John did not originally plan to enter the film industry. He studied government at Dartmouth College with the intention of continuing on to attend law school, but eventually decided to pursue a career in film rather than law. He moved to New York City, where he worked as a bartender for two years before landing his first job as an assistant editor under Rick Shaine on the 1984 adaptation of Herb Gardner's play The Goodbye People. He was an editorial assistant on several films made throughout the 1980s, including Francis Ford Coppola's Peggy Sue Got Married (1986) and Gardens of Stone (1987). His first film as the primary editor was The Luckiest Man in the World (1989), which was written and directed by his father.

Gilroy also edited films including Billy Madison (1995), Shadow Magic (2000), Suspect Zero (2004) and Trust the Man (2005). He worked with his brother Tony Gilroy, a screenwriter and director, for the first time on Tony's film Michael Clayton (2007). The film received seven Academy Award nominations and John's editing was nominated for a BAFTA Award and an American Cinema Editors Eddie Award. John and Tony later collaborated on Duplicity (2009) and The Bourne Legacy (2012). In 2014 John worked with his other brother, fraternal twin Dan Gilroy, also a screenwriter and director, as the editor of Nightcrawler, for which he was nominated for an Independent Spirit Award for Best Editing. He has edited films for every member of his immediate family—his father and both brothers—except his mother. He has also worked often with director Gavin O'Connor, and edited Phillip Noyce's Salt (2010) and Guillermo del Toro's Pacific Rim (2013).

== Filmography ==
=== Films ===
Year	Film	Director	Notes
1989	The Luckiest Man in the World	Frank D. Gilroy	
1993	Who's the Man?	Ted Demme	Co-edited with Jeffrey Wolf
1995	Billy Madison	Tamra Davis	Co-edited with Jeffrey Wolf
1999	Tumbleweeds	Gavin O'Connor	
1999	Game Day	Steve Klein	
2000	Shadow Magic	Ann Hu	Co-edited with Keith Reamer
2002	Narc	Joe Carnahan	
2002	Crazy Little Thing	Matthew Miller	
2004	Miracle	Gavin O'Connor	Co-edited with Daric Loo
2004	Suspect Zero	E. Elias Merhige	Co-edited with Robert K. Lambert
2005	Trust the Man	Bart Freundlich	
2007	First Born	Isaac Webb	
2007	Michael Clayton	Tony Gilroy	Nominated — BAFTA Award for Best Editing
2008	Pride and Glory	Gavin O'Connor	Co-edited with Lisa Zeno Churgin
2009	Duplicity	Tony Gilroy	
2010	Salt	Philip Noyce	Co-edited with Stuart Baird
2011	Warrior	Gavin O'Connor	Co-edited with Aaron Marshall, Matt Chesse and Sean Albertson
2012	The Bourne Legacy	Tony Gilroy	
2013	Pacific Rim	Guillermo del Toro	Co-edited with Peter Amundson
2014	Nightcrawler	Dan Gilroy	Nominated — BAFTA Award for Best Editing
2016	Suicide Squad	David Ayer	
2016	Rogue One	Gareth Edwards	Co-edited with Colin Goudie and Jabez Olssen
2017	Roman J. Israel, Esq.	Dan Gilroy	
2019	Velvet Buzzsaw	Dan Gilroy	
2026	Behemoth!	Tony Gilroy	Also producer

=== Television series ===
Year	Television series	Creator	Editor	Producer	Notes
2022–2025	Andor	No	Yes	Co-producer	8 episodes Fourth collaboration with Tony and Dan Gilroy; Co-edited with Tim Porter
