= Tony Gilroy =

American filmmaker (born 1956)

- Gilroy in 2026
- Born: Anthony Joseph Gilroy; September 11, 1956 (age 70); New York City, U.S.
- Occupations: Screenwriter; producer; director
- Years active: 1992–present
- Spouse: Susan Gilroy
- Children: 2
- Father: Frank D. Gilroy
- Relatives: Dan Gilroy (brother); John Gilroy (brother)

Anthony Joseph Gilroy (born September 11, 1956) is an American screenwriter, director, and producer. He wrote the screenplays of The Bourne Identity (2002), The Bourne Supremacy (2004), and The Bourne Ultimatum (2007), the first three films in the Bourne film franchise, and wrote and directed the fourth film of the franchise, The Bourne Legacy (2012), as well as Michael Clayton (2007), Duplicity (2009) and Behemoth! (2026).

He received Academy Award nominations for Best Director and the Best Original Screenplay for Michael Clayton. After co-writing the Star Wars film Rogue One (2016), for which he directed uncredited reshoots, he became the creator, showrunner, head writer and executive producer of its prequel series Andor (2022–2025) on Disney+, receiving three Emmy Award nominations.

== Early life ==
Gilroy was born in Manhattan, New York City, the son of Ruth Dorothy (née Gaydos), a sculptor and writer, and Frank D. Gilroy, an award-winning playwright, director, and movie producer. He is the brother of screenwriter Dan Gilroy and editor John Gilroy. Through his father, he is of Italian, Irish and German descent. He has two children, Sam and Kathryn, and is married to Susan Gilroy.

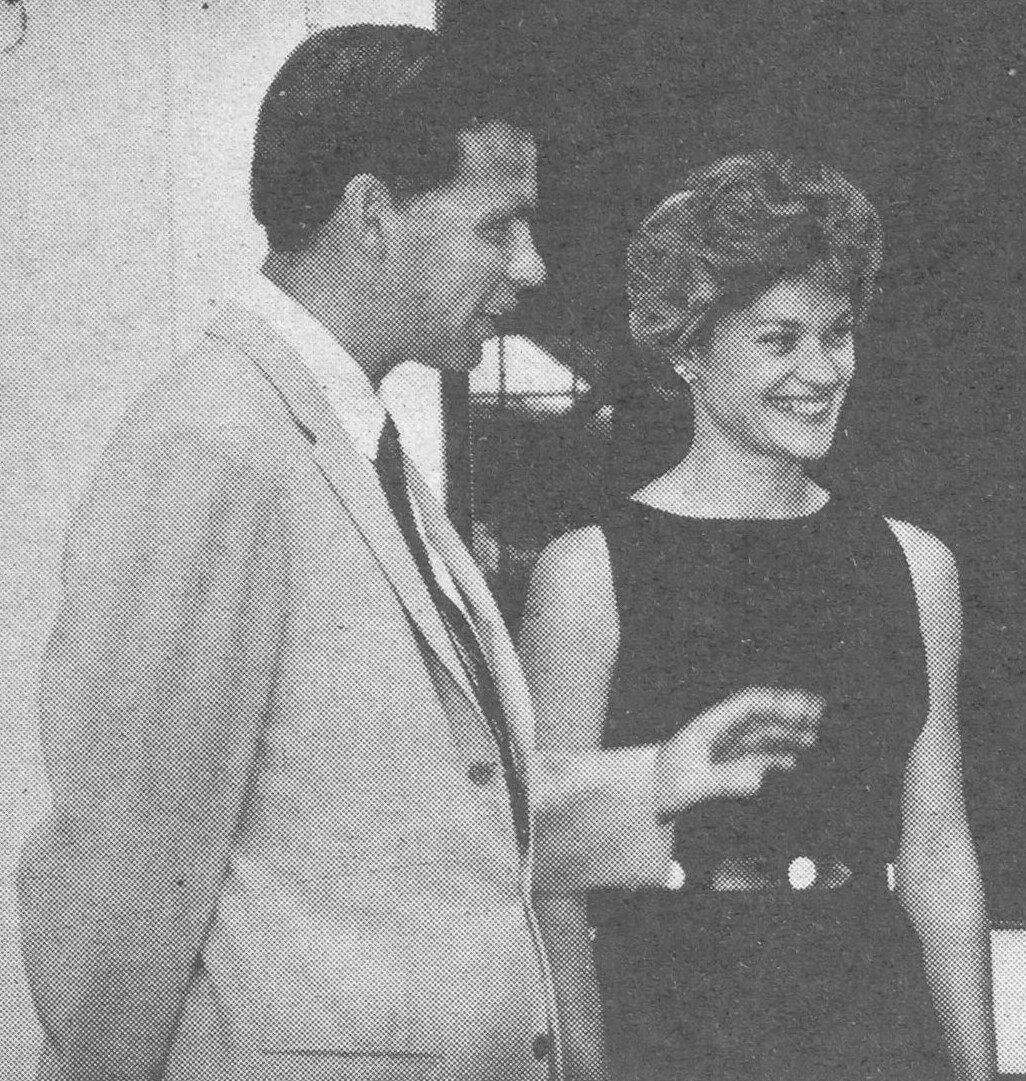
Gilroy's parents Frank (left) and Ruth at their home in Blooming Grove, New York in 1974

Gilroy was raised in Washingtonville, New York. He graduated from Washingtonville High School in 1974 at 16 years old and attended Boston University for two years before dropping out to concentrate on his music career.

== Career ==
=== Writing ===
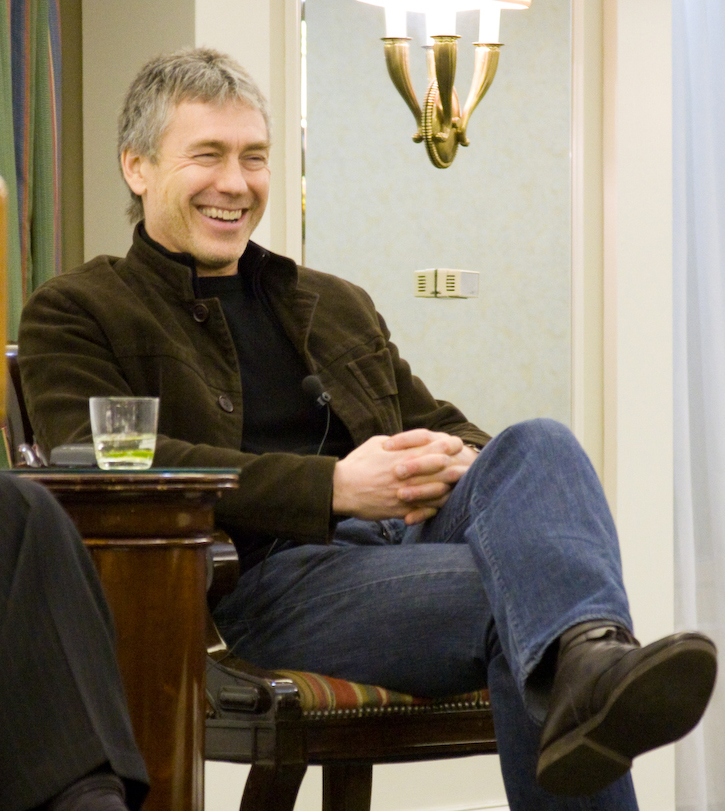
Gilroy in March 2009

Gilroy has written many scripts for film, starting with the script for The Cutting Edge in 1992. This was followed by Dolores Claiborne in 1995 and The Devil's Advocate in 1997. He was one of five credited writers on Michael Bay's Armageddon, the highest-grossing film of 1998. Gilroy's next script was Proof of Life in 2000. In 2002, 2003 and 2007 he wrote the screenplays for The Bourne Identity, The Bourne Supremacy and The Bourne Ultimatum, and wrote and directed the next installment of the Bourne series, The Bourne Legacy (2012).

Also in 2007, he wrote and directed the film Michael Clayton, which won an Edgar Award for Best Motion Picture Screenplay, and was nominated for several Academy Awards including screenplay. In 2009, Gilroy wrote and directed the romantic comedy spy film Duplicity, starring Clive Owen, Julia Roberts and Tom Wilkinson. Gilroy was set, along with The Bourne Ultimatum co-screenwriter Scott Z. Burns, to write the script for the upcoming film Army of Two, based on the video game from EA Montreal.

In September 2013, Gilroy delivered a screenwriting lecture as part of the BAFTA and BFI Screenwriters' Lecture Series.

In 2018, he received a Distinguished Screenwriter Award from the Austin Film Festival.

=== Directing ===
Gilroy's directorial debut was in 2007, when he directed the film Michael Clayton, which his brother John Gilroy edited. The film was nominated for seven Academy Awards, including Best Picture, Best Director and Best Actor. In addition to its Edgar Award, the film won one Oscar, for Best Supporting Actress (Tilda Swinton). The film was a box office success, grossing over $92 million worldwide.

He also wrote and directed his next film, Duplicity, released March 20, 2009, and starring Clive Owen, Julia Roberts and Tom Wilkinson. He then took over as director of the next entry in the Bourne series as well as co-writing; the film, The Bourne Legacy, was released August 10, 2012, starring Jeremy Renner, Rachel Weisz, Edward Norton, Joan Allen, and Albert Finney.

=== Star Wars ===
In 2016, Gilroy co-wrote the script to the sci-fi war film Rogue One, directed by Gareth Edwards. It is a prequel to the 1977 film Star Wars. Gilroy shared writing duties with fellow filmmaker Chris Weitz.

In October 2019, Gilroy returned to the Star Wars franchise to serve as the showrunner for the Disney+ political spy drama Andor, taking over from Stephen Schiff. Gilroy wrote five of the twelve episodes in the series' first season and was also originally set to direct multiple episodes. However, Toby Haynes took over as the director of these episodes due to COVID-19 travel restrictions. After multiple delays, Andor premiered on September 21, 2022, and received widespread critical acclaim. Its first season earned eight Emmy nominations, including Outstanding Drama Series, as well as nominations for writing, directing, cinematography and musical score. The second season received fourteen nominations in 2025, including Outstanding Drama Series and won five awards: Outstanding Writing for a Drama Series (awarded to Dan Gilroy for "Welcome to the Rebellion"), along with awards for production design, fantasy/sci-fi costumes, editing, and visual effects.

=== Post-Andor work ===
In March 2025, it was reported that Tony Gilroy was shopping a new feature film he would write and direct, starring Oscar Isaac. The film, titled Behemoth!, was acquired by Searchlight Pictures and is set to star Pedro Pascal (replacing Isaac), Eva Victor, and Olivia Wilde.

== Filmography ==
=== Feature films ===
Year	Title	Director	Writer	Producer	Notes
1992	The Cutting Edge	No	Yes	No	
1995	Dolores Claiborne	No	Yes	No	
1996	Extreme Measures	No	Yes	No	
1997	The Devil's Advocate	No	Yes	No	
1998	Armageddon	No	Adaptation	No	
2000	Bait	No	Yes	Executive	
2000	Proof of Life	No	Yes	Executive	
2002	The Bourne Identity	No	Yes	No	
2004	The Bourne Supremacy	No	Yes	No	
2007	The Bourne Ultimatum	No	Yes	No	
2007	Michael Clayton	Yes	Yes	No	Uncredited voice cameo as "Taxi Driver"
2009	Duplicity	Yes	Yes	No	
2009	State of Play	No	Yes	No	
2012	The Bourne Legacy	Yes	Yes	No	
2014	Nightcrawler	No	No	Yes	
2016	Rogue One	No	Yes	No	Uncredited director of reshoots; Uncredited voice cameo as "Rebel Flight Controller"
2016	The Great Wall	No	Yes	No	
2018	Beirut	No	Yes	Yes	
2026	Behemoth!	Yes	Yes	Yes	

Uncredited writing works

Year	Title	Notes
1998	Enemy of the State	
2012	Red Dawn	limited rewrites
2014	Godzilla	rewrites
2021	The Woman in the Window	Rewrites for reshoots

=== Television ===
Year(s)	Title	Writer	Producer	Notes
1993	For Better and for Worse	Yes	No	Television movie
2015–2016	House of Cards	No	Consulting	26 episodes (seasons 3 and 4)
2022–2025	Andor	Yes	Executive	Creator and executive producer Writer (8 episodes); Uncredited voice cameo as "Rebel Flight Controller" (Note: For season 2, episode 11 "Who Else Knows?")

== Awards and nominations ==
Year	Title	Award	Category	Result
2007	Michael Clayton	Academy Awards	Best Director	Nominated
2007	Michael Clayton	Academy Awards	Best Original Screenplay	Nominated
2007	Michael Clayton	BAFTA Awards	Best Original Screenplay	Nominated
2007	Michael Clayton	Broadcast Film Critics Association	Best Screenplay	Nominated
2007	Michael Clayton	Chicago Film Critics Association	Best Director	Nominated
2007	Michael Clayton	Chicago Film Critics Association	Best Original Screenplay	Nominated
2007	Michael Clayton	Directors Guild of America Awards	Outstanding Directing – Feature Film	Nominated
2007	Michael Clayton	Edgar Awards	Best Motion Picture Screenplay	Won
2007	Michael Clayton	Satellite Awards	Best Original Screenplay	Nominated
2007	Michael Clayton	Venice Film Festival	Golden Lion	Nominated
2007	Michael Clayton	Writers Guild of America Awards	Best Original Screenplay	Nominated
2022	Andor	75th Primetime Emmy Awards	Outstanding Drama Series	Nominated
2022	Andor	Peabody Awards	Entertainment	Won
2025	Andor	77th Primetime Emmy Awards	Outstanding Drama Series	Nominated
2025	Andor	77th Primetime Creative Arts Emmy Awards	Outstanding Original Music and Lyrics (Note: for "We Are the Ghor (Planetary Anthem)" by Nicholas Britell and Gilroy, featured in "Who Are You?")	Nominated
