= Nightcrawler (film) =

2014 American film by Dan Gilroy

- Theatrical release poster
- Directed by: Dan Gilroy
- Written by: Dan Gilroy
- Produced by: Michel Litvak; Jake Gyllenhaal; David Lancaster; Jennifer Fox; Tony Gilroy
- Starring: Jake Gyllenhaal; Rene Russo; Riz Ahmed; Bill Paxton
- Cinematography: Robert Elswit
- Edited by: John Gilroy
- Music by: James Newton Howard
- Production company: Bold Films
- Distributed by: Open Road Films
- Release dates: September 5, 2014 (TIFF); October 31, 2014 (United States)
- Running time: 117 minutes
- Country: United States
- Language: English
- Budget: $8.5 million
- Box office: $50.3 million

Nightcrawler is a 2014 American satirical psychological thriller film written and directed by Dan Gilroy in his directorial debut. It stars Jake Gyllenhaal as a psychopathic stringer who seeks out violent and morbid events late at night in Los Angeles so he can film them and sell the exclusive footage to a local television news station. The supporting cast includes Rene Russo, Riz Ahmed, and Bill Paxton.

Gilroy originally wanted to make a film about the life of the American photographer Weegee, but switched focus after discovering the unique narrative possibilities surrounding the stringer profession. He wrote the protagonist as an antihero, based on the ideas of unemployment and capitalism; a common theme in the film is the symbiotic relationship between unethical journalism and consumer demand. Gyllenhaal served as a producer on the film and played a pivotal role in its creation, becoming involved in choosing members of the crew and watching other actors' audition tapes. Filming was a challenging process, taking place across 80 locations over the course of four weeks.

Open Road Films utilized viral marketing to promote Nightcrawler, including a fictional video résumé on Craigslist and fake social media profiles for the protagonist. The film premiered at the 2014 Toronto International Film Festival on September 15 and was released theatrically on October 31, going on to gross $50.3 million against a budget of $8.5 million and gaining a cult following in the process. It was met with widespread praise, especially Gilroy's screenplay and the performances of Gyllenhaal and Russo. Several critics listed Nightcrawler as one of the best films of 2014 and it received various accolades, including a Best Original Screenplay nomination at the 87th Academy Awards. Gyllenhaal was nominated as Lead Actor for the Actor Award, BAFTA Award, Golden Globe Award and Critics' Choice Movie Award, with his non-nomination in the Best Actor Oscar category considered by many to be a snub. (Note: Attributed to multiple sources.)

== Plot ==
At a Los Angeles rail yard, petty thief Lou attacks a guard and steals small materials. He sells them to a scrap yard asking for a job, he is refused. While driving home, Lou spots a car crash and pulls over. Stringers arrive and record the wreckage and police response. One stringer, Joe, explains to Lou how they sell film footage to local news stations. Joe declines Lou's request for a job.

Lou steals a bicycle and pawns it for a camcorder and a police scanner. Lou records the aftermath of a fatal carjacking and sells the footage to KWLA6. The morning news director, Nina, says the station is especially interested in "graphic" footage of accidents and violent crime in affluent, predominantly white areas. Lou hires Rick, a young homeless man desperate for money, as his assistant. To create more dramatic film footage, Lou tampers with crime scenes. As Lou's work gains traction, he buys better equipment and a fast car.

Lou establishes a working relationship with Nina at KWLA6. Knowing Nina's two-year contract is nearly up and that she needs higher ratings to keep her job, he threatens to sell his footage to other stations unless she agrees to sex, higher payment, and on-air credit for his footage. Recognizing Lou as a competitor, Joe offers to hire him as his new second van to cover the whole LA area, but Lou declines. Joe beats him to a plane crash story and gloats to Lou. Nina berates Lou, demanding he get better footage to keep their bargain. In the daytime, Lou drives to Joe's house and tampers with his van. Later, Joe is severely injured in a car crash, Lou records the aftermath.

Lou and Rick arrive before the police at the site of a homicide home invasion in Granada Hills. Lou films the gunmen leaving as well as the victims in the house. He presents the footage to the station after editing out the perpetrators. The news staff frets over the ethics of using the footage, but Nina is eager to break the story. In exchange, Lou demands public credit, more money, and that Nina unhesitatingly meet his sexual demands. Police detective Frontieri questions Lou regarding his connection to the home invasion. Lou gives her edited footage of the incident that omits the gunmen.

That night, Lou and Rick track one gunman to his house. Uneasy, Rick negotiates a raise and promotion, which helps salve his worry. Lou delays calling the police, wanting a more public area for recording the arrest, predicting it will be violent. Alarmed at possible innocents being hurt, Rick reopens negotiation, irritating Lou. He demands half the $50,000 reward money for locating the gunman and threatens to tell the police about Lou withholding evidence. Under duress, Lou is forced to acquiesce.

The gunman leaves and picks up his partner. Lou and Rick follow them to a crowded diner, where Lou calls the police. The police arrive, where they kill one gunmen, as the other escapes. Lou and Rick follow the pursuing police, filming it, which culminates in a multiple-car collision. Lou approaches the gunman's crashed vehicle peering inside-instructing Rick to film a close-up, as he sets up for a wide shot, saying the gunman is dead. As Rick peers inside, he is shot by the gunman. The gunman flees and is shot dead by arriving police. As Rick lies dying, he accuses Lou of knowing the gunman was alive. Lou, filming Rick, says he cannot work with an untrustworthy employee.

Nina is awed by the footage and expresses devotion to Lou. The news team discovers the home invasion was actually a drugs heist. Nina holds the story until the following night's news to maximize the story's dramatic impact. Police try to confiscate Lou's footage, but Nina defends her legal right to withhold it and immediately airs it. Lou voluntarily speaks with Detective Frontieri and fabricates a story about the gunmen following him. Frontieri accuses Lou of lying but lacks evidence. Later, Lou now has two vans and hires a team of interns to expand his film business, telling them that he will not ask them to do anything he is unwilling to do himself.

== Cast ==
- Jake Gyllenhaal as Louis "Lou" Bloom
- Rene Russo as Nina Romina
- Riz Ahmed as Rick
- Bill Paxton as Joe Loder
- Kevin Rahm as Frank Kruse
- Michael Hyatt as Detective Frontieri
- Ann Cusack as Linda
- Carolyn Gilroy, the daughter of editor John Gilroy and niece of director Dan Gilroy as KWLA 6 employee Jenny
- Michael Papajohn as Security Guard
- James Huang as Marcus Mayhem Video
- Eric Lange as Ace Video Cameraman
- Kiff VandenHeuvel as Editor
- Myra Turley as Female Neighbour
- Jamie McShane as Freaked Motorist
- Leah Fredkin as Female Anchor
- Kent Shocknek as himself
- Pat Harvey as herself
- Sharon Tay as herself
- Rick Garcia as himself
- Bill Seward as himself

== Themes ==
According to Dean Biron of Overland, "Nightcrawler is a shattering critique of both modern-day media practice and consumer culture." Throughout the film, Nina sensationalizes news headlines in an attempt to increase viewership. PopMatters' Jon Lisi believes that, because of Nina's actions, the film specifically targets journalists who exaggerate headlines in order to combat a decline in viewership. Ed Rampell of The Progressive offers similar commentary, stating: "Nightcrawler contends that ethnic and class biases are used to determine what is, and is not, deemed 'worthy' of news coverage. Local politics and related matters that actually affect viewers' lives get short shrift." As much as the film indicts modern journalism, Nightcrawler's director Dan Gilroy noted that his goal was for audiences to realize that by watching sensationalized news stories, they themselves are encouraging unethical journalism. Biron argues that Lou's character in the film is created because of consumer demand, and that he is a "reflection of the symbiotic relationship between commercial imperatives and audience desire". Critics Alyssa Rosenberg and Sam Adams argue that Nightcrawler is not so much a critique of journalism, but instead a depiction of Lou's entitlement.

The exact genre of Nightcrawler has been the subject of debate. While most critics agree that the film predominantly features thriller elements, other descriptions have been used, including dark comedy, drama, horror, and neo-noir. When asked about the film's genre, Gilroy stated: "I see Nightcrawler as having genre elements in the sense that it's a thriller. It also has some strong dramatic elements and I think I understand the question as there's some really strong elements of drama." Gyllenhaal particularly noted the comedic elements, commenting: "Gilroy and I were laughing pretty much the whole movie."

== Production ==
=== Development ===
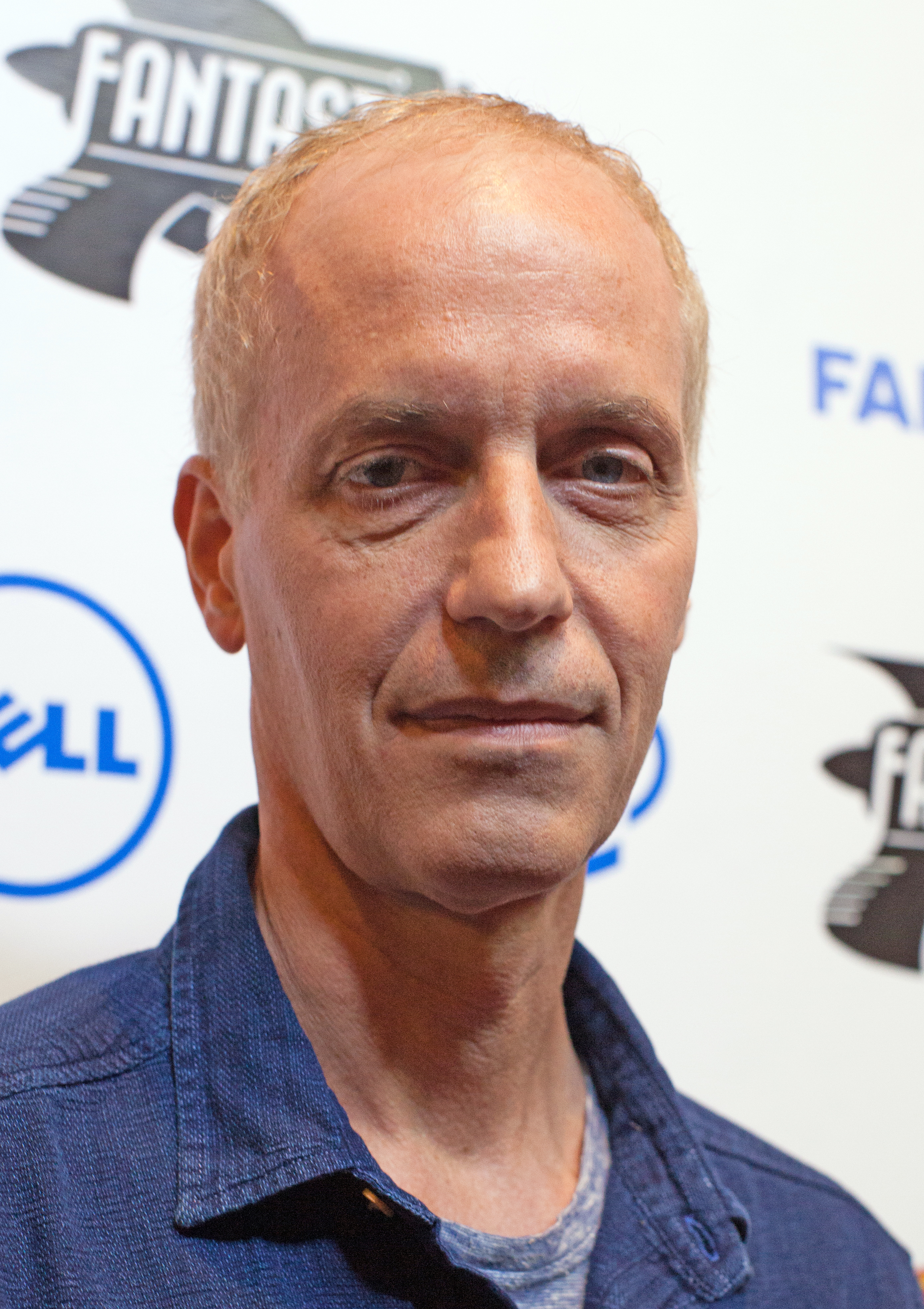
Nightcrawler was the directorial debut for Dan Gilroy, who had previously spent several years as a screenwriter.

Gilroy conceived the idea for Nightcrawler in 1988, after reading the photo-book Naked City, a collection of photographs taken by American photographer Weegee of 1940s New York City residents at night. Often lewd and sensationalized in content, Weegee would sell these photos to tabloid newspapers. Intrigued by what he described as "an amazing intersection of art and crime and commerce", Gilroy wrote a film treatment with a "Chinatown feel". He shelved the idea after the release of The Public Eye (1992), which was loosely based on Weegee's life. Two years later, he moved to Los Angeles, and noted the predominance of violent crime stories on local news stations. "I suddenly became aware of and intrigued by the idea that it must be a powerful force for a TV station, when they realize their ratings go through the roof when they show something with the potential for violence, like a police chase", says Gilroy. Sometime later, he discovered the stringer profession, and considered it to be the modern day equivalent of Weegee. Unaware of any film that focused on the livelihood of stringers, he began writing a screenplay.

Gilroy spent several years trying to write a plot that would fit the setting, and experimented with conspiracies and murder mysteries as central story elements. Eventually, he decided to instead start by designing the characters, and attempted to create a standard literary hero character. Unable to create an interesting hero, he then envisioned an antihero as the lead character. Gilroy felt antiheroes were a rarity in films, because they are difficult to write, and usually devolve into psychopaths; in an attempt to break from the stereotype, he thought of writing an antihero success story. Several films, including The King of Comedy (1982), To Die For (1995), and The Talented Mr. Ripley (1999), were used as research on how to write antiheroes.

To create Lou Bloom's character, Gilroy explored the ideas of unemployment and capitalism. He wanted to portray Lou as someone who perpetually focuses on the precepts of capitalism, and how these thoughts not only give him sanity, but also push him over the edge. Gilroy did not give Lou a character arc, as he believed that people develop their ideals at a certain point in their life, and that they stay that way regardless of what happens. This is depicted in the opening scene of the film, when Lou attacks a security guard, which informs the audience that Lou is a criminal, and not someone who lost his morality as a result of the job. Lou's backstory was purposefully left out of the script, as Gilroy felt that without one, the audience would create their own backstories for Lou, and become more engaged with the character. Gilroy remarked that Lou eventually became a vehicle for the ideas and themes that he wanted to express in the film.

=== Pre-production ===
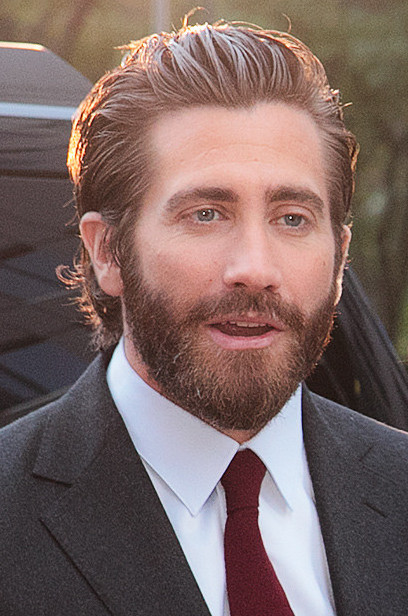
In addition to portraying the role of Lou Bloom, Jake Gyllenhaal (pictured) became heavily involved in the pre-production of Nightcrawler, from choosing members of the production crew to watching audition tapes.

Once the script was finalized, Gilroy knew that he wanted to direct the film. He sent the script to his brother Tony Gilroy, and asked him for advice on directing. His brother described the script as "absolutely compelling", and noted every person who read the script afterwards wanted to work on the project, a rarity in the film industry. The production crew included film editor John Gilroy, cinematographer Robert Elswit, and composer James Newton Howard. Gilroy previously met Elswit while working as a screenwriter for The Bourne Legacy (2012); the two formed a partnership, and created a shot-list for Nightcrawler months before filming. The production team needed licensed background footage for the newsroom scenes, and the Raishbrook brothers, three real stringers, offered their footage. The Raishbrook brothers were eventually brought on as technical advisers.

Gyllenhaal was Gilroy's first choice for the role of Lou. During pre-production, Gyllenhaal was going to star in another film, but that project fell through, allowing time to meet with Gilroy. The two discussed the script in Atlanta, where Gyllenhaal was filming Prisoners (2013). When Gilroy told Gyllenhaal that he wrote Nightcrawler as a success story, Gyllenhaal became interested in the film. "This character was beautifully written. The dialogue is pretty extraordinary. Just even the style of the script was an amazing read", said Gyllenhaal. The two rehearsed the script months before filming began, and Gyllenhaal became heavily involved in production, from choosing members of the crew to watching audition tapes. While rehearsing the character, Gilroy mentioned how he saw Lou as a coyote, a nocturnal predator who is driven by its never ending hunger. Gyllenhaal took this comment literally, and lost nearly thirty pounds by eating nothing but kale salads and chewing gum, and running fifteen miles every day. Although some of the crew disagreed with this decision, Gilroy was supportive of the weight loss; Gyllenhaal was respectful and did not alter the script, so Gilroy wanted to reciprocate this generosity.

Riz Ahmed was one of seventy-five actors to audition for the role of Rick. Ahmed was attending a friend's wedding in Los Angeles, when his talent agent suggested he meet Gilroy to discuss the film's script. Gilroy told Ahmed that he had seen his previous work; he was not fit for the role, but still allowed him to audition. Within the first minute of his audition tape, Gilroy felt confident in the actor's abilities. To prepare for the role, Ahmed met with homeless people in Skid Row, and researched homeless shelters to "understand the system". He found that most of the people dealt with abandonment issues, and attempted to replicate this in Rick's abusive relationship with Lou. Additionally, Gilroy, Gyllenhaal, and Ahmed rode with the Raishbrook brothers at night to accurately portray their lifestyle.

Gilroy specifically wrote the role of Nina for his wife Rene Russo; this was because he felt that Nina could easily be reduced to a "hard-nosed corporate bitch", but Russo would bring a sense of vulnerability to the character. Although Russo was unaware of Gilroy's intention while writing the script, she was interested in performing the role, as she had never portrayed a desperate woman in a film. Russo initially struggled with the character, because she never saw herself as the victim. In order to accurately portray the character, Russo had to recall memories of when she crossed moral boundaries in her life as a result of desperation and fear. In contrast to the preparations Gyllenhaal and Ahmed took for their roles, Russo did not consult news directors or journalists, as she believed that Nina could be in any business, and did not want to limit her character to one profession.

=== Filming ===
Nightcrawler was filmed on a budget of $8.5 million, most of which was financed by Bold Films. Part of the budget came from a $2.3 million California Film Tax Credit, which rewards directors for producing films in California. Tony Gilroy noted the budget was extremely low, and should have "easily cost twice that amount". To make the most out of the budget, Elswit built "efficiencies" into each day of the film schedule, a role that all three Gilroy brothers described as instrumental to the completion of the film. Before the filming for Nightcrawler began, the production crew spent two days location scouting across Los Angeles. Some crew members did not believe there was going to be enough time to film every scene, and that at least 15 pages of the script would have to be cut; Gilroy took these comments as a personal challenge. Principal photography began on October 6, 2013, in Los Angeles and lasted 27 days. Filming was a challenging and busy process, as 80 locations were used, and there were many times in which the crew had to move to multiple locations each night. Gilroy remarked that there was never a day that filming was not completed minutes before sunrise.

One of the goals while filming Nightcrawler was to portray Los Angeles as having "an untamed spirit, a wildness, a timelessness, about it", and to not let the visuals dictate the dark tone of the script. Gilroy believes that, in contrast to the desaturated, man-made feel that the city is often depicted with, Los Angeles is a "landscape of primal struggle and survival". Gyllenhaal's animalistic approach to the script influenced this belief, and the idea was to film Nightcrawler like a wildlife documentary. To achieve this goal, Elswit used wide-angle lens, depth of field, and avoided soft focus to bring a sense of landscape.

=== Music ===
James Newton Howard composed the score for Nightcrawler. Unlike the large and cinematic scores that had previously defined his career, Howard composed moody electronica pieces for Nightcrawler, heavily influenced by 1980s synth. Howard initially struggled writing a score that fit both the overall atmosphere of the film and Gilroy's expectations. Instead of using what Consequence of Sound described as "the expected 10 strings and a nightmarish score", Gilroy wanted more uplifting and subversive music. The goal was for the audience to believe that the music is actually playing inside Lou's mind. For example, in the scene when Lou moves a dead body to get a better angle, the music sounds triumphant instead of dark, which is meant to convey how excited Lou is about the shot. Howard describes this as "an anthem of potential for his tremendous success". For shots of Los Angeles, Howard used a subtle electronic sound, while shots with Lou used a more orchestral, clarinet-driven sound. He believed that Lou could go through difficult situations easily and with a certain intelligence, and that orchestral music would best suit Lou.

== Release ==
According to Open Road Films CEO Tom Ortenberg, the company attempted to market Nightcrawler to both mainstream audiences and art house critics. "We had material that portrayed the picture as the commercial property that it is, but not while abandoning its indie roots", says Ortenberg. The first trailer was released on July 23, while a red band trailer was released on October 24. In addition to typical trailers, Nightcrawler also used some unusual viral marketing strategies. On July 19, a fictional video résumé for Lou was posted on Craigslist. In the video, Lou discusses his benefits for potential employers. A few months later, LinkedIn and Twitter profiles were created for Lou. These profiles purport the video production business that Lou runs in the film to be real, and endorse Lou's management and strategic planning skills.

An unfinished version of Nightcrawler was screened on May 16, at the 2014 Cannes Film Festival; the film sparked a bidding war between several distribution companies, including A24, Focus Features, Fox Searchlight Pictures, Open Road Films, and The Weinstein Company. Open Road Films acquired the distribution rights in the United States for around $4.5 million. Nightcrawler had its world premiere on September 5, at the 2014 Toronto International Film Festival. It also screened at several other film festivals, including the Atlantic Film Festival, Fantastic Fest, and the Rome Film Festival. The film was originally scheduled for a theatrical release on October 17, but Open Road Films moved the release to October 31, to avoid competition with several bigger-budget films like Fury, Birdman, Dracula Untold, and The Book of Life.

=== Home media ===
Nightcrawler was released on DVD and Blu-ray formats on February 10, 2015, courtesy of Universal Pictures Home Entertainment. Special features on the Blu-ray release include an audio commentary in which the three Gilroy brothers discuss the film's production, and a five-minute making-of video with behind-the-scenes shots and interviews. In its first week of DVD and Blu-ray release, Nightcrawler sold 67,132 units, and grossed $1.1 million. In its second week, the film dropped sixty-seven percent in sales, and made $371,442, for an overall total of $1.5 million.

== Reception ==
=== Box office ===
In North America, Nightcrawler earned $500,000 from early screenings, and after opening to 2,766 theaters, grossed $3.2 million on its first day of release. It finished its opening weekend with $10.9 million; journalists attributed the low sales to Halloween festivities. In its second weekend, Nightcrawler dropped forty-nine percent in sales, and grossed $5.4 million. After grossing $28.8 million by December, Nightcrawler reentered North American theaters due to several nominations during the 2014 film awards season. The film eventually finished with $32.4 million in North America.

In the United Kingdom, Nightcrawler opened to £1 million ($1.33 million), and grossed an additional £545,221 ($725,563) in its second weekend. The film would eventually earn $18 million in international territories, and when combined with its North American sales, earned $50.3 million. Despite its low production budget, Ortenberg believes that Nightcrawler was able to succeed at the box office by word-of-mouth marketing. "College kids, cinephiles, mainstream moviegoers across the country as well as critics and bloggers started taking possession of Nightcrawler as their own and championed it. It became a cause for people to promote it and get it seen", says Ortenberg.

=== Critical response ===
The website Rotten Tomatoes aggregated an approval rating of 95% for the film based on 279 reviews and an average rating of 8.3/10. The site's critical consensus reads: "Restless, visually sleek, and powered by a lithe star performance from Jake Gyllenhaal, Nightcrawler offers dark, thought-provoking thrills." On Metacritic, the film has a score of 76 out of 100, based on reviews from 45 critics, indicating "generally favorable reviews". Audiences polled by CinemaScore gave the film an average grade of "B−" on an A+ to F scale.

Reviewers call Gyllenhaal's character a "charming sociopath" and his performance "a bravura, career-changing tour-de-force". Film critic Christy Lemire called Gyllenhaal's performance "supremely creepy" and praised the film's themes and messages. Christopher Orr of The Atlantic compared Gyllenhaal to a young Robert De Niro and his performances in the films Taxi Driver (1976) and The King of Comedy, feeling Gyllenhaal's character harbored traits shared by De Niro's characters in the two films. Orr called Gyllenhaal "tremendous" in the role and stated that the actor was learning to "channel an eerie, inner charisma, offering it up in glimpses and glimmers rather than all at once". He also declared the role as Gyllenhaal's "best performance to date". Ben Sachs of the Chicago Reader highlighted Gilroy's direction, and how he was able to command an "uncommon assurance" from the cast and crew, despite being a first time director. Conversely, Richard Roeper felt that Gyllenhaal's performance was merely good, and that it did not enter "new dramatic territory". He also found that Russo's character eventually becomes a caricature.

Keith Uhlich of The A.V. Club named Nightcrawler the eighth-best film of 2014. Its screenplay was ranked the ninth best of the 2010s in WhatCulture: "This feverous script succeeds because it contains one of modern cinema's greatest character [sic], Lou Bloom- macabre, ruthless, brazenly tranquil yet simmering with a latent violence [...] Gilroy opts for one-word sentences which zip across the page like Bloom's Dodge Challenger tearing down the interstate for the next car crash or burn victim." The writer also argued that the trajectory of the main character "plays to our guilt over our voyeurism- we consume the footage which men like Bloom provide, we allow the likes of him to rise in society".

In 2021, members of Writers Guild of America West (WGAW) and Writers Guild of America, East (WGAE) voted its screenplay 53rd in WGA’s 101 Greatest Screenplays of the 21st Century (So Far). In 2024, Paste Magazine ranked the character 5th among "the best portrayals of cinematic sociopaths".

In 2025, Nightcrawler was among the films voted for the "Readers' Choice" edition of The New York Times' list of "The 100 Best Movies of the 21st Century," finishing at number 232.

=== Top ten lists ===
Nightcrawler was listed on many critics' top ten lists.

- 1st – Den of Geek
- 2nd – Joshua Rothkopf, Time Out New York
- 3rd – Matt Goldberg, Collider.com
- 3rd – Erik Davis, Movies.com
- 3rd – Yahoo! Movies
- 4th – Nathan Rabin, The Dissolve
- 4th – James Rocchi, The Wrap
- 4th – Edward Douglass, ComingSoon.net
- 5th – Time Out London
- 5th – Scott Feinberg, The Hollywood Reporter
- 6th – Mara Reinstein, Us Weekly
- 7th – Tom Brook, BBC
- 7th – Richard Corliss, Time
- 7th – Adam Chitwood, Collider.com
- 8th – Lou Lumenick, New York Post
- 8th – Inkoo King, The Wrap
- 8th – Drew McWeeny, HitFix
- 8th – Matt Zoller Seitz, RogerEbert.com
- 8th – Noel Murray, The Dissolve
- 8th – William Bibbiani, CraveOnline
- 8th – Harry Knowles, Ain't It Cool News
- 9th – Rafer Guzmán, Newsday
- 9th – Steve Persall, Tampa Bay Times
- 10th – Tom Buggermann, Indiewire

==== Top 10 (ranked alphabetically) ====
- Steven Rea, Philadelphia Inquirer
- Claudia Puig, USA Today
- Justin Lowe, Indiewire
- Stephen Whitty, The Star-Ledger
- Joe Williams, St. Louis Post-Dispatch
- Amy Nicholson, Village Voice

=== Accolades ===
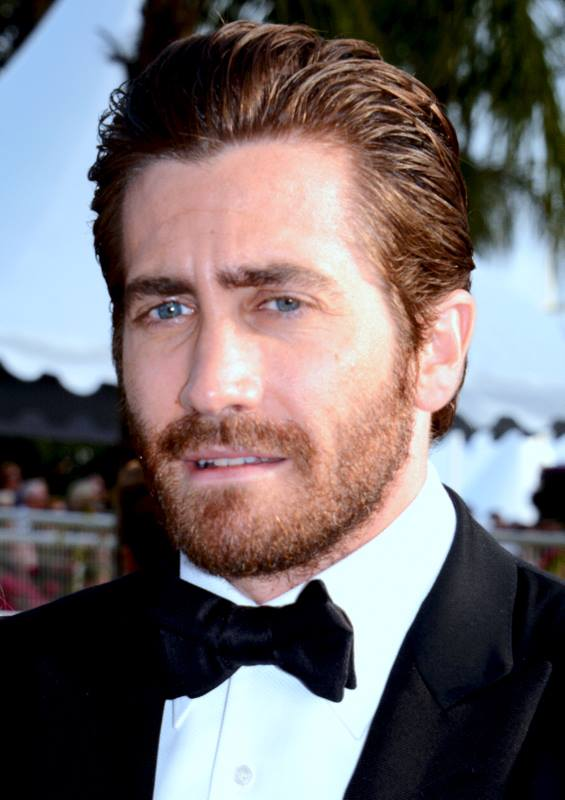
Gyllenhaal's performance was widely acclaimed, earning him Lead Actor nominations for every major award, with his miss in the Best Actor Oscar category considered by many to be a snub. (Note: Attributed to multiple sources.)

Nightcrawler was nominated for several awards, most of which went to Gyllenhaal's performance and Gilroy's screenplay. At the 87th Academy Awards, Gilroy was nominated for an Academy Award for Best Original Screenplay. The film received an additional four nominations at the 68th British Academy Film Awards, three nominations at the 20th Critics' Choice Awards, one nomination at the 72nd Golden Globe Awards, and one nomination at the 21st Screen Actors Guild Awards, but did not win any of them. It did, however, win Best Film at the 19th San Diego Film Critics Society Awards.

Gyllenhaal was nominated for the Actor Award, BAFTA Award, Golden Globe Award and Critics' Choice Movie Award, surprisingly missing in the Best Actor Oscar category. (Note: Attributed to multiple sources.)

== See also ==
- List of films featuring psychopaths and sociopaths
- Medium Cool
