= Dan Gilroy =

American filmmaker (born 1959)

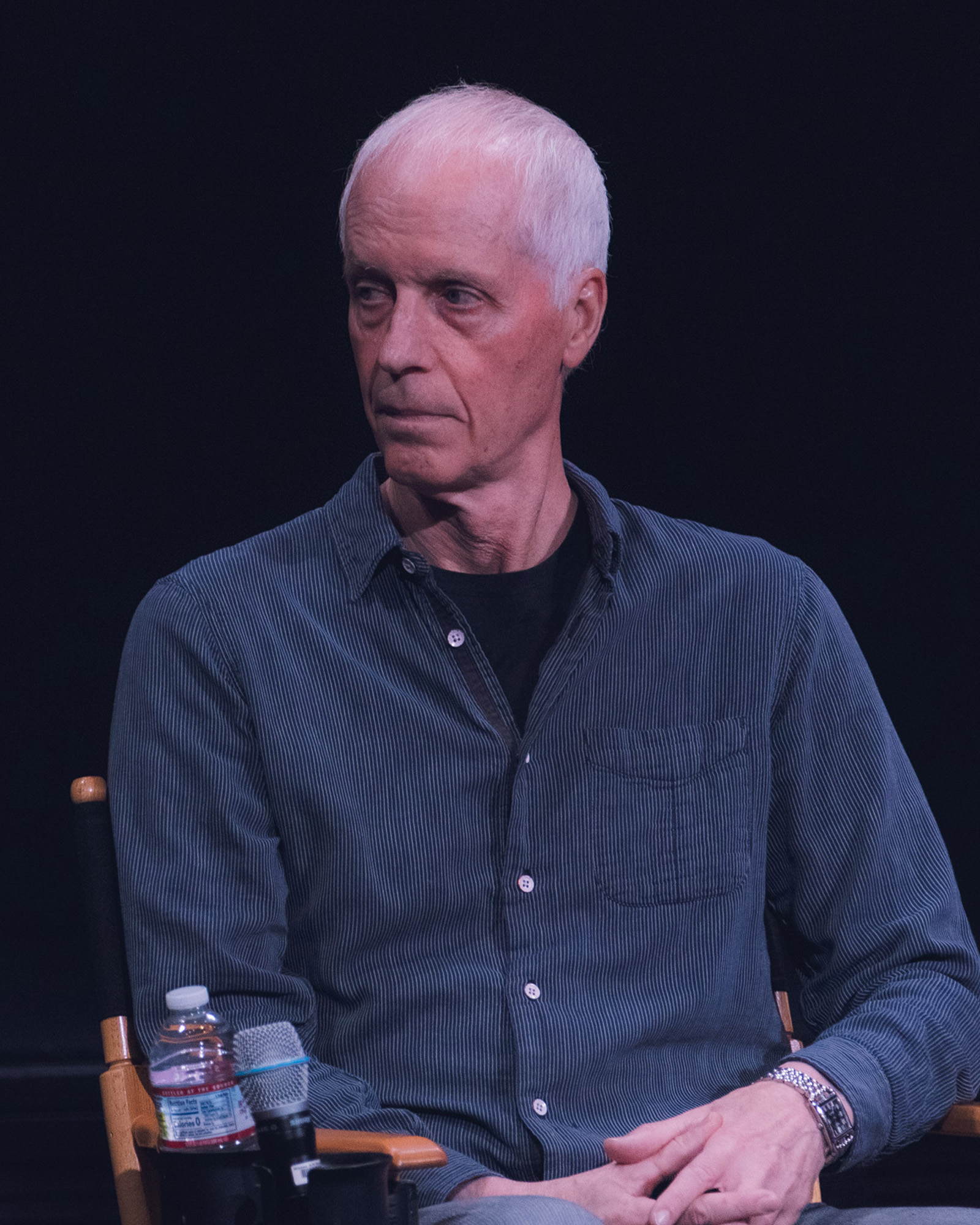
- Gilroy in 2025
- Born: Daniel Christopher Gilroy; June 24, 1959 (age 67); Santa Monica, California, U.S.
- Education: Dartmouth College (BA)
- Occupations: Screenwriter; film director
- Years active: 1992–present
- Spouse: Rene Russo (m. 1992)
- Children: 1
- Parents: Frank D. Gilroy (father); Ruth Dorothy Gaydos (mother)
- Relatives: Tony Gilroy (brother); John Gilroy (twin brother)

Daniel Christopher Gilroy (born June 24, 1959) is an American screenwriter and film director. He is best known for writing and directing Nightcrawler (2014), for which he won Best Screenplay at the 30th Independent Spirit Awards, and was nominated for Best Original Screenplay at the 87th Academy Awards. His other screenwriting credits include Freejack (1992), Two for the Money (2005), The Fall (2006), Real Steel (2011), and The Bourne Legacy (2012)—the last in collaboration with his brother Tony Gilroy. His wife, Rene Russo, has also been his frequent collaborator since the two met in 1992 and married later that year. (Note: Rene Russo appeared in Freejack, Two for the Money, Nightcrawler, and Velvet Buzzsaw—all films that Gilroy has written.) He wrote six episodes over two seasons of the drama series Andor (2022–2025), and for his work on the second season he won the Primetime Emmy Award for Outstanding Writing For A Drama Series.

== Early life ==
Dan Gilroy was born on June 24, 1959, in Santa Monica, California. He is the son of Pulitzer Prize-winning playwright Frank D. Gilroy, and sculptor and writer Ruth Dorothy Gaydos. His brother, Tony, is a screenwriter and director, and his fraternal twin brother, John, is a film editor. Dan Gilroy remembered that as a boy, seeing his father work and write at home full-time simplified the intricacies of becoming a writer.

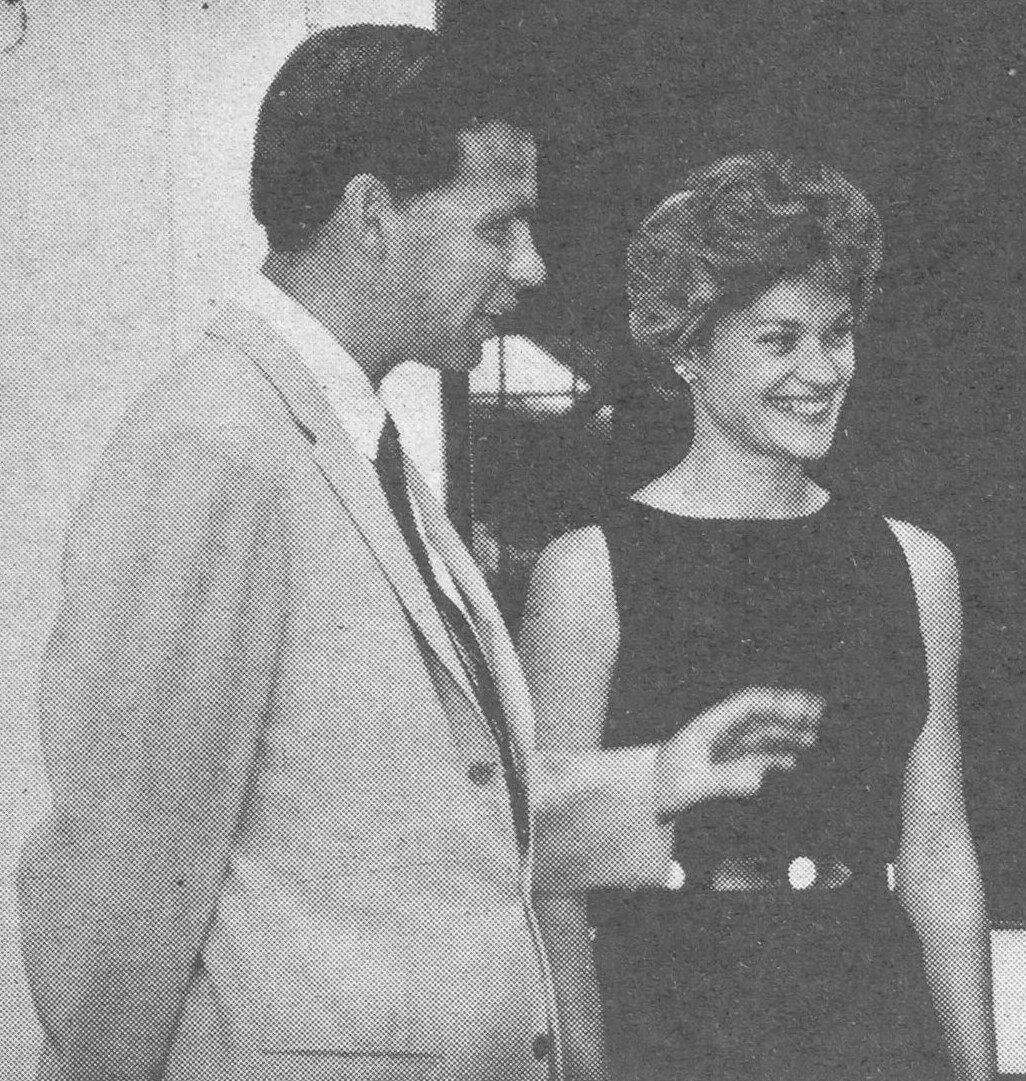
Gilroy's parents Frank (left) and Ruth at their home in Blooming Grove, New York in 1974

Gilroy grew up in Washingtonville, New York, where he attended Washingtonville High School. In 1981, he graduated with a degree in English literature from Dartmouth College, which his father also attended. At Dartmouth, he and Boston Globe film critic Ty Burr were classmates and attended a class taught by David Thomson, another film critic. Gilroy developed a strong interest in written works of the Victorian era—chiefly those of Charles Dickens, Anthony Trollope, and George Eliot.

== Career ==
Gilroy's debut novel, a thriller titled Sight Unseen, was published by Carroll & Graf Publishers in 1989. It tells the story of an NSA satellite analyst who discovers a sunken Russian submarine off the coast of California containing the remains of American sailors. Reviewing for The New York Times, Newgate Callendar called the novel "a clever, smoothly written piece of work that is never dull."

Gilroy began his screenwriting career by co-writing the science fiction thriller Freejack (1992) with Steven Pressfield and Ronald Shusett, directed by Geoff Murphy and based on the novel Immortality, Inc. by Robert Sheckley. There, he met the film's co-star Rene Russo, whom he married later that year. After Freejack, he wrote for the films Chasers (1994), Two for the Money (2005), and The Fall (2006). In his positive review of Two for the Money, Roger Ebert of the Chicago Sun-Times said Gilroy's script "is about three people who are transformed in relation to one another, as a situation develops that is equally dangerous all the way around".

With Jeremy Leven, he co-wrote for Real Steel (2011), directed by Shawn Levy and based on Richard Matheson's short story "Steel". He co-wrote with his brother Tony Gilroy the script for The Bourne Legacy (2012), which was edited by his fraternal twin brother, John Gilroy. Directed by Tony Gilroy, the film is inspired by Robert Ludlum's Jason Bourne novel series. Manohla Dargis of The New York Times described the Gilroys' script as something that "has given [Tony] much more to wrangle—locations, characters, hardware, franchise expectations—than he's had to deal with in the past", while Toronto Star reviewer Peter Howell said it resorted "too much into jabbering and jargon and not enough into action".

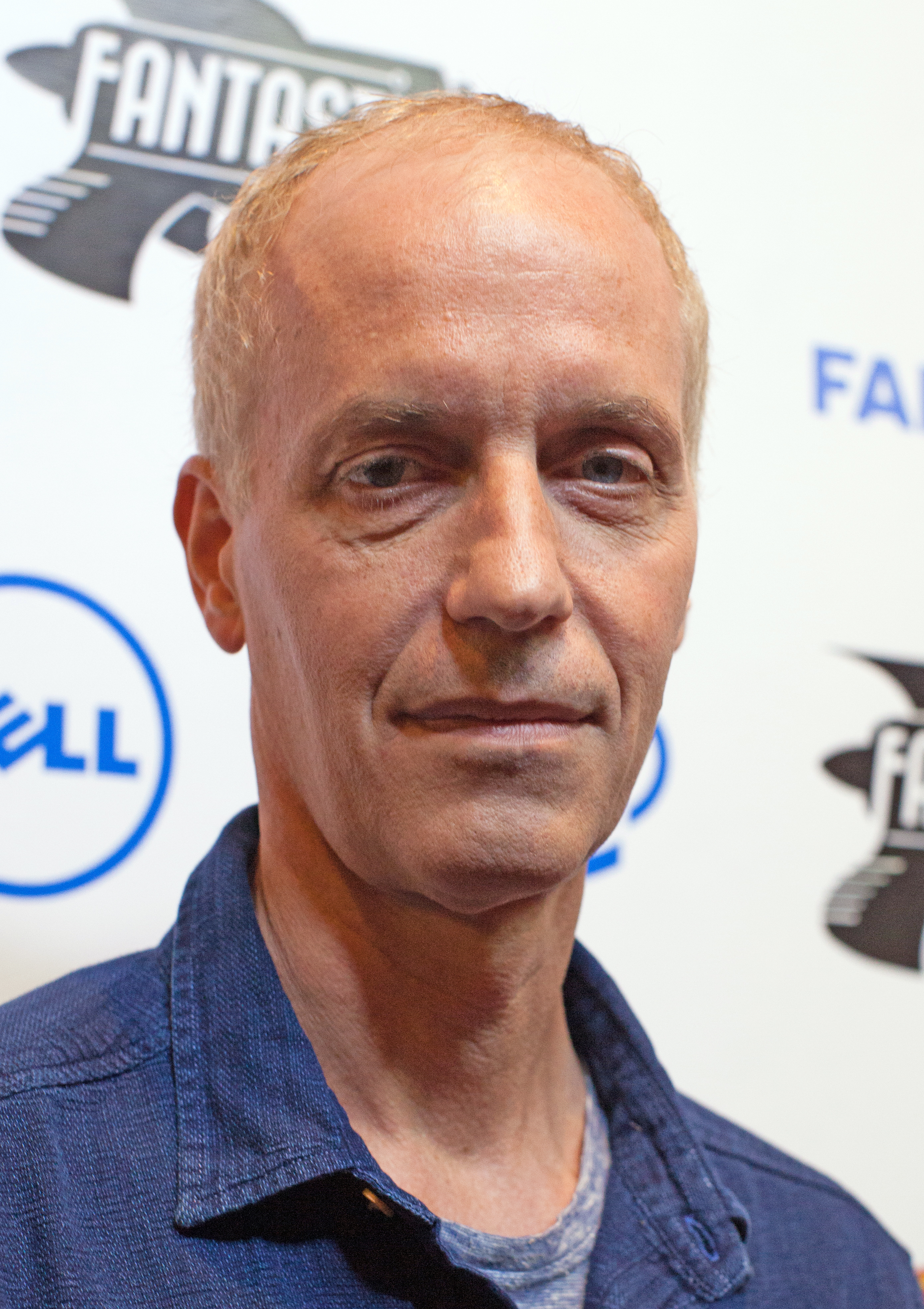
Gilroy at Fantastic Fest 2014

Gilroy made his directorial debut with the thriller Nightcrawler (2014), which starred Jake Gyllenhaal, Rene Russo, and Riz Ahmed. Gilroy also wrote the script, which he conceived in 1988 after reading the photo-book Naked City, a collection of photographs taken by American photographer Weegee of 1940s New York City residents at night. Gilroy did not begin writing the script until he moved to Los Angeles two years later, when he recognized an abundance of violent stories on television news. According to Gilroy, he considers the film to be a success story about a modern equivalent of Weegee, and a cautionary tale about the risks posed by capitalism. Nightcrawler was well received by the press on release, as was Gilroy's script, for which he was nominated for Best Original Screenplay at the 87th Academy Awards, and won Best Screenplay at the 30th Independent Spirit Awards. At the Independent Spirit Awards, Gilroy closed his acceptance speech by lamenting the proliferation of superhero films in Hollywood.

In 2017, he co-wrote Jordan Vogt-Roberts's adventure Kong: Skull Island with Max Borenstein and Derek Connolly, and wrote and directed Roman J. Israel, Esq., a legal drama starring Denzel Washington. Gilroy conceived of Roman J. Israel after doing extensive research about the 1960s where many Americans have staunchly protested and advocated certain individual and group rights. The script had started as a spec, whose title role he wrote specifically for Washington; Gilroy has said that he would not have made the film had Washington declined to take over the role. After its premiere at the Toronto International Film Festival (TIFF), he re-edited the film by trimming thirteen minutes of runtime to get the plot to arrive quickly as the previous cut had laid much emphasis on the characters. On release, although Washington's performance was mostly praised, Gilroy's script for the film drew ambivalent responses from the press: Peter Travers at Rolling Stone praised it as "above standard-issue legal thriller but below the transcendent personal drama it aspires to be", while Entertainment Weekly's Chris Nashawaty felt it was ultimately a letdown.

From 2022 to 2025, Gilroy served as a writer on the Disney+ series Andor, which was created by his brother Tony. He wrote three episodes for each of the series' two seasons, winning the Primetime Emmy Award for Outstanding Writing for a Drama Series in 2025 for the episode “Welcome to the Rebellion”. In April 2025, it was announced that Gilroy would write a Miami Vice film to be directed by Joseph Kosinski. It will be a reboot of the Miami Vice franchise following the original television series and 2006 film.

=== Other projects ===
Gilroy was hired by Tim Burton to re-write Wesley Strick's Superman Lives script, making it more budget conscious and expanding the psychology for the final shooting drafts before it was cancelled by WB. Gilroy later appeared in the documentary The Death of "Superman Lives": What Happened? (2015) to recount his contribution to the project. In 2011, he was due to write a film adaptation of the comic strip adventure The Annihilator.

== Personal life ==
Gilroy resides in Los Angeles with actress Rene Russo, to whom he has been married since 1992. The couple has a daughter, Rose.

== Filmography ==
Film

Year	Title	Director	Writer	Notes	Ref.
1992	Freejack	No	Yes		
1994	Chasers	No	Yes		
2005	Two for the Money	No	Yes	Also executive producer	
2006	The Fall	No	Yes		
2011	Real Steel	No	Story		
2012	The Bourne Legacy	No	Yes		
2014	Nightcrawler	Yes	Yes	Directorial debut	
2017	Kong: Skull Island	No	Yes		
2017	Roman J. Israel, Esq.	Yes	Yes		
2019	Velvet Buzzsaw	Yes	Yes		
2028	Miami Vice '85 †	No	Yes	Filming	

Producer

- Magazine Dreams (2025)

TV writer

Year	Title	Notes
2007	City of Light	6 episodes
2022–2025	Andor	6 episodes

== Awards and nominations ==
Year	Award	Category	Title	Result
2014	Academy Awards	Best Original Screenplay	Nightcrawler	Nominated
2014	BAFTA Awards	Best Original Screenplay	Nightcrawler	Nominated
2025	Primetime Emmy Awards	Outstanding Writing for a Drama Series (For episode "Welcome to the Rebellion")	Andor	Won
