= List of Dutch Top 40 number-one singles of 2012 =

This is a list of the Dutch Top 40 number-one singles of 2012. The Dutch Top 40 is a chart that ranks the best-performing singles of the Netherlands. It is published every week by radio station Radio 538. The chart had 51 releases in 2012.

Ten acts gained their first number-one single in the Dutch Top 40 in 2012, either as lead or featured act: Studio Killers, Michel Teló, Triggerfinger, Gusttavo Lima, will.i.am, Eva Simons, Asaf Avidan, Psy, Sandra van Nieuwland and Passenger.

== Chart history ==
Issue Date	Song	Artist(s)	Reference(s)
January 7	"Ode to the Bouncer"	Studio Killers	
January 14	"Ai Se Eu Te Pego!"	Michel Teló	
January 21	"Ai Se Eu Te Pego!"	Michel Teló	
January 28	"Ai Se Eu Te Pego!"	Michel Teló	
February 4	"Ai Se Eu Te Pego!"	Michel Teló	
February 11	"Ai Se Eu Te Pego!"	Michel Teló	
February 18	"Ai Se Eu Te Pego!"	Michel Teló	
February 25	"Ai Se Eu Te Pego!"	Michel Teló	
March 3	"Ai Se Eu Te Pego!"	Michel Teló	
March 10	"Ai Se Eu Te Pego!"	Michel Teló	
March 17	"Ai Se Eu Te Pego!"	Michel Teló	
March 24	"Ai Se Eu Te Pego!"	Michel Teló	
March 31	"I Follow Rivers"	Triggerfinger	
April 7	"I Follow Rivers"	Triggerfinger	
April 14	"I Follow Rivers"	Triggerfinger	
April 21	"I Follow Rivers"	Triggerfinger	
April 28	"I Follow Rivers"	Triggerfinger	
May 5	"I Follow Rivers"	Triggerfinger	
May 12	"Balada"	Gusttavo Lima	
May 19	"Balada"	Gusttavo Lima	
May 26	"Balada"	Gusttavo Lima	
June 2	"Balada"	Gusttavo Lima	
June 9	"Balada"	Gusttavo Lima	
June 16	"Balada"	Gusttavo Lima	
June 23	"Balada"	Gusttavo Lima	
June 30	"Balada"	Gusttavo Lima	
July 7	"Balada"	Gusttavo Lima	
July 14	"Balada"	Gusttavo Lima	
July 21	"Balada"	Gusttavo Lima	
July 28	"Balada"	Gusttavo Lima	
August 4	"Balada"	Gusttavo Lima	
August 11	"Slapeloze nachten"	The Opposites	
August 18	"This Is Love"	will.i.am featuring Eva Simons	
August 25	"One Day / Reckoning Song" (Wankelmut Rmx)	Asaf Avidan	
September 1	"One Day / Reckoning Song" (Wankelmut Rmx)	Asaf Avidan	
September 8	"One Day / Reckoning Song" (Wankelmut Rmx)	Asaf Avidan	
September 15	"One Day / Reckoning Song" (Wankelmut Rmx)	Asaf Avidan	
September 22	"One Day / Reckoning Song" (Wankelmut Rmx)	Asaf Avidan	
September 29	"One Day / Reckoning Song" (Wankelmut Rmx)	Asaf Avidan	
October 7	"Gangnam Style"	Psy	
October 13	"Gangnam Style"	Psy	
October 20	"Skyfall"	Adele	
October 27	"Skyfall"	Adele	
November 3	"Skyfall"	Adele	
November 10	"Skyfall"	Adele	
November 17	"Skyfall"	Adele	
November 24	"Skyfall"	Adele	
December 1	"Keep Your Head Up"	Sandra van Nieuwland	
December 8	"Keep Your Head Up"	Sandra van Nieuwland	
December 15	"Let Her Go"	Passenger	
December 22	"Let Her Go"	Passenger	
December 29	No Top 40 released		

== Number-one artists ==
Position	Artist	Weeks #1
1	Gusttavo Lima	13
2	Michel Teló	11
3	Triggerfinger	6
3	Asaf Avidan	6
3	Adele	6
4	Psy	2
4	Sandra van Nieuwland	2
4	Passenger	2
5	Studio Killers	1
5	The Opposites	1
5	will.i.am	1
5	Eva Simons	1

== See also ==
- 2012 in music
- List of number-one singles in the Dutch Top 40
