= List of Single Top 100 number-one singles of 2011 =

Throughout all 52 weeks in 2011, 31 songs topped the Mega Single Top 100. The Single Top 100 is a chart composed by MegaCharts based on official physical single sales and legal downloads, and one of the three official Dutch record charts, the two others being the Dutch Top 40 and the Mega Top 50. The first number-one hit on the chart in 2011 was Martin Solveig and Dragonette's "Hello", and the last was Studio Killers' "Ode to the Bouncer".

Artists and acts that had or were featured in at least one song that topped the Mega Single Top 100 that year for at least one week were Martin Solveig, Dragonette, Jan Smit, Ben Saunders, Dean Saunders, Adele, 3JS, Lady GaGa, Nick & Simon, Alexis Jordan, Glennis Grace, Frans Duijts, Do, Coldplay, Rochelle Perts, Guus Meeuwis, Sak Noel, Lucenzo, Big Ali, Don Omar, Nick Schilder, Thomas Acda, Keizer, Paul de Munnik, Gotye, Kimbra, The Voice of Holland, Gers Pardoel, Jeroen van der Boom, Metropole Orkest (Dutch: The Metropole Orchestra), Birdy, Sandro Silva, Quintino and Studio Killers. Out of these acts, 20 of them, Dean Saunders, Alexis Jordan, Glennis Grace, Frans Duijts, Rochelle Perts, Guus Meeuwis, Sak Noel, Don Amor, Big Ali, Lucenzo, Nick Schilder, Thomas Acda, Simon Keizer, Paul de Munnik, Gotye, Kimbra, Birdy, Quintino, Sandro, and Studio Killers, achieved their first number-one single on the chart that year, either as lead or featured artist. Two artists, Jan Simit and Adele, had 2 songs that went number one. 23 singles that topped the chart were solo songs, while eight others were collaborations. One of Adele's songs, "Rolling in the Deep", was the best-performing single of 2011, topping the Single Top 100's 2011 year-end chart.

== Chart history ==
Issue date(s)	Song	Artist(s)
1—8 January	"Hello"	Martin Solveig featuring Dragonette
15 January	"Niemand zo trots als wij"	Jan Smit
22 January	"Kill For A Broken Heart"	Ben Saunders
29 January	"You and I Both"	Dean Saunders
5 February	"Rolling in the Deep"	Adele
12 February	"Je vecht nooit alleen"	3JS
19 February	"Born This Way"	Lady Gaga
26 February	"Rolling in the Deep"	Adele
5 March	"Wijzer (dan je was)"	Nick & Simon
12 March	"Rolling in the Deep"	Adele
19 March	"Je vecht nooit alleen"	3JS
26 March	"Set Fire To The Rain"	Adele
2 April	"Happiness"	Alexis Jordan
9–16 April	"Afscheid"	Glennis Grace
23 April	"Morgen is pas morgen"	Frans Duijts
30 April–7 May	"Happiness"	Alexis Jordan
14 May	"Hij gelooft in mij"	Do
21 May–4 June	"Happiness"	Alexis Jordan
11 June	"Every Teardrop Is A Waterfall"	Coldplay
18 June	"No Air"	Rochelle Perts
25 June	"Armen open"	Guus Meeuwis
2–16 July	"Loca People"	Sak Noel
23 July–20 August	"Vem Dançar Kuduro / Danza Kuduro"	Lucenzo featuring Big Ali / Don Omar
27 August–3 September	"Sterker nu dan ooit"	Nick & Simon (as Nick & Thomas)
9 September	"Kijk me na"	Keizer and Paul de Munnik
17–24 September	"Somebody That I Used To Know"	Gotye feat. Kimbra
1 October	"One Thousand Voices"	The Voice of Holland
8 October	"Hou je dan nog steeds van mij"	Jan Smit
15–22 October	"Somebody That I Used To Know"	Gotye feat. Kimbra
29 October–12 November	"Ik neem je mee"	Gers Pardoel
19 November	"Niemand anders"	Jeroen van der Boom
26 November	"Wereldwijd orkest"	Metropole Orkest
3 December	"Skinny Love	Birdy
10–17 December	"Ik neem je mee"	Gers Pardoel
24 December	"Epic"	Sandro Silva and Quintino
31 December	"Ode to the Bouncer"	Studio Killers

== See also ==
- 2011 in music
- List of Dutch Top 40 number-one singles of 2011
