= Dyland & Lenny =

Puerto Rican reggaeton duo

- Origin: Puerto Rico
- Genres: Reggaeton; Latin pop
- Years active: 2009–2013
- Labels: Mas Flow; Sony Latin
- Members: Carlos Castillo Cruz "Dyland"; Julio Manuel González Távarez "Lenny"

Dyland & Lenny were a Puerto Rican reggaeton duo, consisting of Carlos Castillo Cruz "Dyland" and Julio Manuel González Távarez "Lenny".

== Career ==
Both had planned to become basketball players before making a career in music. They started their career in 2009. With Sony music, the duo made their debut with the album My World in 2010. The album was produced by Luny Tunes. In 2009, they were also featured guests on "Rompiendo Cadenas," lead single from Latin Grammy Award winner Ana Bárbara. In 2010, they release a remix to "Quiere Pa' Que Te Quieran" with Ivy Queen.

On February 12, 2013, the duo released their second studio album called My World 2: The Secret Code, which contains collaborations with various artists such as J Alvarez, Pitbull, Yomo, Victor Manuelle, among others. Their biggest hits are "Nadie Te Amará Como Yo", "Quiere Pa' Que Te Quieran", "Caliente" and "Pégate Más".

At the end of 2013 the separation of the duo was confirmed, Lenny Tavarez who is preparing his solo album, has an approach with producers Los De La Nazza, who include it in the mixtape El Imperio Nazza: Top Secret Edition. Lenny Tavárez had released some of his solo songs such as "La Nena" "Fantasias" and "Tortura".

In 2016, he released another single entitled, "Si Tu Cama Hablara" featuring fellow Puerto Rican, Cosculluela.

== Discography ==
Studio albums

Year	Song	Peak chart positions	
Year	Song	US Top Latin Albums	US Top Heatseekers
2010	My World	13	29
2013	My World 2	48	22

Singles

Year	Song	Peak chart positions			Album
Year	Song	US Hot Latin	US Latin Pop	US Tropical Salsa	Album
2009	"Nadie Te Amará Como Yo"	33	—	27	My World
2010	"Quiere Pa' Que Te Quieran"	17	15	12	My World
2010	"Caliente" (featuring Arcángel)	42	34	—	My World
2012	"Pégate Más"	39	31	8	My World 2
2013	"Sin Ti (I Don't Want to Miss a Thing)" (featuring Pitbull and Beatriz Luengo)	33	18	9	My World 2
"—" denotes a title that was not released or did not chart in that territory

Collaborations

Year	Song	Peak chart positions			Album
Year	Song	US Hot Latin	US Latin Pop	US Tropical Salsa	Album
2009	"Rompiendo Cadenas" (Ana Barbara feat. Dyland & Lenny)	33	1	27	Rompiendo Cadenas
2012	"Balada (Remix)" (Gusttavo Lima feat. Dyland & Lenny)	2	2	1	Gusttavo Lima e você
2012	"Claridad (Remix)" (Luis Fonsi feat. Dyland & Lenny)	–	–	–	Tierra Firme
