= Moving to Mars =

Moving to Mars can refer to:

- "Moving to Mars" (song), a Coldplay song from the Every Teardrop is a Waterfall EP
- Moving to Mars (film), a documentary film about a Burmese family seeking refuge in the United Kingdom

== See also ==
- Moving Mars, a 1993 science fiction novel by Greg Bear
- Colonization of Mars
