= List of number-one hits of 2012 (Switzerland) =

This is a list of the Swiss Hitparade number ones of 2012.

== Swiss charts ==
Issue date	Song	Artist	Album	Artist
8 January	"Hangover"	Taio Cruz featuring Flo Rida	21	Adele
15 January	"Hangover"	Taio Cruz featuring Flo Rida	21	Adele
22 January	"Ai Se Eu Te Pego!"	Michel Teló	21	Adele
29 January	"Ai Se Eu Te Pego!"	Michel Teló	21	Adele
5 February	"Ai Se Eu Te Pego!"	Michel Teló	21	Adele
12 February	"Ai Se Eu Te Pego!"	Michel Teló	Born to Die	Lana Del Rey
19 February	"Ai Se Eu Te Pego!"	Michel Teló	Danke für's Zuhören – Liedersammlung 1998–2012	Xavier Naidoo
26 February	"Ai Se Eu Te Pego!"	Michel Teló	Danke für's Zuhören – Liedersammlung 1998–2012	Xavier Naidoo
4 March	"Ai Se Eu Te Pego!"	Michel Teló	Eile mit Weile	Plüsch
11 March	"Ai Se Eu Te Pego!"	Michel Teló	Danke für's Zuhören – Liedersammlung 1998–2012	Xavier Naidoo
18 March	"Ai Se Eu Te Pego!"	Michel Teló	Wrecking Ball	Bruce Springsteen
25 March	"Ai Se Eu Te Pego!"	Michel Teló	Wrecking Ball	Bruce Springsteen
1 April	"Ai Se Eu Te Pego!"	Michel Teló	Lichter der Stadt	Unheilig
8 April	"Single Ladies"	Remady & Manu-L featuring J-Son	Göteborg	Züri West
15 April	"Heart Skips a Beat"	Olly Murs featuring Rizzle Kicks	Göteborg	Züri West
22 April	"Single Ladies"	Remady & Manu-L featuring J-Son	Göteborg	Züri West
29 April	"Single Ladies"	Remady & Manu-L featuring J-Son	Auch	Die Ärzte
6 May	"Drive By"	Train	Blunderbuss	Jack White
13 May	"Don't Think About Me"	Luca Hänni	...Little Broken Hearts	Norah Jones
20 May	"Don't Think About Me"	Luca Hänni	Ballast der Republik	Die Toten Hosen
27 May	"Whistle"	Flo Rida	A Joyful Noise	Gossip
3 June	"Call Me Maybe"	Carly Rae Jepsen	My Name Is Luca	Luca Hänni
10 June	"Euphoria"	Loreen	My Name Is Luca	Luca Hänni
17 June	"Balada"	Gusttavo Lima	Firebirth	Gotthard
24 June	"Tacatà"	Tacabro	Ängu u Dämone I	Gölä
1 July	"Tacatà"	Tacabro	Ängu u Dämone I	Gölä
8 July	"Tacatà"	Tacabro	Johnny - The Rimini Flashdown Part II	Patent Ochsner
15 July	"Tacatà"	Tacabro	Living Things	Linkin Park
22 July	"Balada"	Gusttavo Lima	Ängu u Dämone II	Gölä
29 July	"Balada"	Gusttavo Lima	Ängu u Dämone II	Gölä
5 August	"Balada"	Gusttavo Lima	Ängu u Dämone II	Gölä
12 August	"Skyline"	Pegasus	Ängu u Dämone II	Gölä
19 August	"Skyline"	Pegasus	Ängu u Dämone II	Gölä
26 August	"Skyline"	Pegasus	Ängu u Dämone II	Gölä
2 September	"One Day / Reckoning Song" (Wankelmut Remix)	Asaf Avidan	What Is Next	Lunik
9 September	"One Day / Reckoning Song" (Wankelmut Remix)	Asaf Avidan	Havoc and Bright Lights	Alanis Morissette
16 September	"One Day / Reckoning Song" (Wankelmut Remix)	Asaf Avidan	Flöru	Florian Ast
23 September	"One Day / Reckoning Song" (Wankelmut Remix)	Asaf Avidan	Coexist	The xx
30 September	"One Day / Reckoning Song" (Wankelmut Remix)	Asaf Avidan	The Truth About Love	Pink
7 October	"One Day / Reckoning Song" (Wankelmut Remix)	Asaf Avidan	Gespaltene Persönlichkeit	Xavas
14 October	"One Day / Reckoning Song" (Wankelmut Remix)	Asaf Avidan	The 2nd Law	Muse
21 October	"Skyfall"	Adele	Oko Town	77 Bombay Street
28 October	"I Love"	Sons of Nature	A=myf	Bushido
4 November	"Gangnam Style"	Psy	L'envolée	Stephan Eicher
11 November	"Gangnam Style"	Psy	L'envolée	Stephan Eicher
18 November	"Skyfall"	Adele	Take the Crown	Robbie Williams
25 November	"Skyfall"	Adele	Take Me Home	One Direction
2 December	"Diamonds"	Rihanna	Unapologetic	Rihanna
9 December	"Diamonds"	Rihanna	Noël's Room	Noah Veraguth, Stress, Bastian Baker
16 December	"Diamonds"	Rihanna	Guten Tag	Paul Kalkbrenner
23 December	"Diamonds"	Rihanna	Unorthodox Jukebox	Bruno Mars

== Romandie charts ==
Issue date	Song	Artist	Album	Artist
8 January	"She Doesn't Mind"	Sean Paul	21	Adele
15 January	"She Doesn't Mind"	Sean Paul	21	Adele
22 January	"Ai se eu te pego!"	Michel Teló	21	Adele
29 January	"Ai se eu te pego!"	Michel Teló	21	Adele
5 February	"Ai se eu te pego!"	Michel Teló	21	Adele
12 February	"Ai se eu te pego!"	Michel Teló	Born to Die	Lana Del Rey
19 February	"Ai se eu te pego!"	Michel Teló	Born to Die	Lana Del Rey
26 February	"Ai se eu te pego!"	Michel Teló	Born to Die	Lana Del Rey
4 March	"Ai se eu te pego!"	Michel Teló	21	Adele
11 March	"Ai se eu te pego!"	Michel Teló	21	Adele
18 March	"Ai se eu te pego!"	Michel Teló	Wrecking Ball	Bruce Springsteen
25 March	"Ai se eu te pego!"	Michel Teló	21	Adele
1 April	"Ai se eu te pego!"	Michel Teló	2012: Le bal des Enfoirés	Les Enfoirés
8 April	"Ai se eu te pego!"	Michel Teló	MDNA	Madonna
15 April	"Somebody That I Used to Know"	Gotye featuring Kimbra	2012: Le bal des Enfoirés	Les Enfoirés
22 April	"Somebody That I Used to Know"	Gotye featuring Kimbra	2012: Le bal des Enfoirés	Les Enfoirés
29 April	"Somebody That I Used to Know"	Gotye featuring Kimbra	2012: Le bal des Enfoirés	Les Enfoirés
6 May	"Somebody That I Used to Know"	Gotye featuring Kimbra	Blunderbuss	Jack White
13 May	"Don't Think About Me"	Luca Hänni	...Little Broken Hearts	Norah Jones
20 May	"We Are Young"	Fun featuring Janelle Monáe	...Little Broken Hearts	Norah Jones
27 May	"Whistle"	Flo Rida	A Joyful Noise	Gossip
3 June	"Call Me Maybe"	Carly Rae Jepsen	Apocalyptic Love	Slash featuring Myles Kennedy and The Conspirators
10 June	"Balada"	Gusttavo Lima	The Absence	Melody Gardot
17 June	"Balada"	Gusttavo Lima	Firebirth	Gotthard
24 June	"Tacatà"	Tacabro	Life in a Beautiful Light	Amy Macdonald
1 July	"Tacatà"	Tacabro	Life in a Beautiful Light	Amy Macdonald
8 July	"Tacatà"	Tacabro	Living Things	Linkin Park
15 July	"Whistle"	Flo Rida	Living Things	Linkin Park
22 July	"Whistle"	Flo Rida	Living Things	Linkin Park
29 July	"Whistle"	Flo Rida	Living Things	Linkin Park
5 August	"Balada"	Gusttavo Lima	Up In The Sky	77 Bombay Street
12 August	"Tacatà"	Tacabro	Living Things	Linkin Park
19 August	"Call Me Maybe"	Carly Rae Jepsen	Firebirth	Gotthard
26 August	"Whistle"	Flo Rida	Anastasis	Dead Can Dance
2 September	"This Is Love"	Will.i.am feat. Eva Simons	What Is Next	Lunik
9 September	"This Is Love"	Will.i.am feat. Eva Simons	Havoc and Bright Lights	Alanis Morissette
16 September	"One Day / Reckoning Song" (Wankelmut Remix)	Asaf Avidan	No Fear, No Bravery	Aloan
23 September	"One Day / Reckoning Song" (Wankelmut Remix)	Asaf Avidan	Coexist	The xx
30 September	"One Day / Reckoning Song" (Wankelmut Remix)	Asaf Avidan	The Truth About Love	Pink
7 October	"One Day / Reckoning Song" (Wankelmut Remix)	Asaf Avidan	The Truth About Love	Pink
14 October	"One Day / Reckoning Song" (Wankelmut Remix)	Asaf Avidan	The 2nd Law	Muse
21 October	"Skyfall"	Adele	The 2nd Law	Muse
28 October	"Gangnam Style"	PSY	The 2nd Law	Muse
4 November	"Gangnam Style"	PSY	Lénvolée	Stephan Eicher
11 November	"Skyfall"	Adele	Lénvolée	Stephan Eicher
18 November	"Skyfall"	Adele	Sans attendre	Céline Dion
25 November	"Skyfall"	Adele	L'attente	Johnny Hallyday
2 December	"Diamonds"	Rihanna	Unapologetic	Rihanna
9 December	"Diamonds"	Rihanna	Lequel de nous	Patrick Bruel
16 December	"Diamonds"	Rihanna	Monkey Me	Mylène Farmer
23 December	"Diamonds"	Rihanna	Monkey Me	Mylène Farmer
