= My World (Dyland & Lenny album) =

Studio album by Dyland & Lenny
- Released: March 2, 2010
- Genre: R&B; Latin pop; reggaeton; vallenato
- Length: 52:37
- Label: Sony Latin
- Producer: Luny Tunes (exec.); Tainy; Josh "The Secret Code"; MadMusick; Noltom; Predikador; Keko Music; Mambo Kingz

Dyland & Lenny chronology
| My World (2010) | My World 2 (2013) |

Singles from My World
- 1. "Nadie Te Amará Como Yo" Released: October 16, 2009; 2. "Quiere Pa' Que Te Quieran" Released: February 11, 2010

Professional ratings
Review scores
| Source | Rating |
|---|---|
| AllMusic | 3.5/5 stars |

My World is the debut album by Puerto Rican reggaeton duo Dyland & Lenny. It was released on March 2, 2010. The first single from the album was titled "Nadie Te Amará Como Yo", which reached number 33 on Billboard Hot Latin Songs charts. My World was nominated for a Lo Nuestro Award for Urban Album of the Year.

== Track listing ==
- Standard edition:

| No. | Title | Length |
|---|---|---|
| 1. | "My World (Intro)" | 4:37 |
| 2. | "Mi Lady" | 3:25 |
| 3. | "Nadie Te Amará Como Yo" | 3:24 |
| 4. | "Caliente (featuring Arcángel)" | 3:26 |
| 5. | "Quiere Pa' Que Te Quieran" | 3:21 |
| 6. | "Tu Cuerpo Es Ley (featuring Zion & Lennox)" | 3:51 |
| 7. | "Pánico" | 3:03 |
| 8. | "Esclavo De Tu Piel" | 3:30 |
| 9. | "Loco" | 3:26 |
| 10. | "Posesiva" | 3:25 |
| 11. | "La Telenovela" | 4:10 |
| 12. | "Sexo En La Disco" | 2:59 |
| 13. | "Lucía" | 2:51 |
| 14. | "Nadie Te Amará Como Yo (Remix) (featuring Arcángel and Zion)" | 3:48 |
| 15. | "Quiere Pa' Que Te Quieran (Pop Version)" | 3:21 |

== Charts ==
| Chart (2010) | Peak position |
|---|---|
| US Billboard Top Heakseekers Albums | 29 |
| US Billboard Top Latin Albums | 13 |
