= Mat Whitecross =

English film director and editor

- Born: 21 September 1977 (age 48); Oxford, England
- Occupations: Director; editor; screenwriter
- Years active: 1999–present

Mat Whitecross (born 21 September 1977) is an English film director, editor, and screenwriter. He began his career working for Michael Winterbottom, a director, and producer Andrew Eaton at Revolution Films. Whitecross is known for directing The Road to Guantánamo;an Ian Dury biopic, Sex & Drugs & Rock & Roll; as well as music documentaries Oasis: Supersonic and Coldplay: A Head Full of Dreams. Whitecross has directed music videos for Coldplay, Take That and the Rolling Stones, being a long-time collaborator of Coldplay's.

== Career ==
Whitecross was born in Oxford, England, and grew up there. His parents were political refugees who were imprisoned in Argentina during the country's Dirty War. He takes inspiration from the place where he grew up and from his parents' friends, many of whom are South American immigrants who fled tortures and prison. He began his career working for filmmaker Michael Winterbottom and Andrew Eaton at Revolution Films as a runner on the film 24 Hour Party People. Within a few months of starting at Revolution Films, they gave him the chance of shooting and editing for them. His directorial debut The Road to Guantanamo began as a conversation with Winterbottom about the Tipton Three whilst on the shoot for the film 9 Songs. They both agreed that the story was fascinating and worth of a film but due to other commitments, Winterbottom was unable to begin research and preparation, suggesting that Whitecross should start the process. Whitecross and Winterbottom then co-directed and co-wrote the film which features Riz Ahmed in his debut acting role. The Road to Guantánamo won the Silver Bear for Best Director at the 56th Berlin International Film Festival in Berlin, Germany and the Independent Spirit Award for Best Documentary Feature.

== Filmography ==
=== Film ===
Year	Title	Director	Writer	Editor	Ref.
2004	9 Songs	No	No	Yes	
2006	The Road to Guantánamo (co-directed and co-written with Michael Winterbottom)	Yes	Yes	Yes	
2006	Scott Walker: 30 Century Man	No	No	Yes	
2009	Moving to Mars	Yes	Yes	No	
2009	The Shock Doctrine (co-directed with Michael Winterbottom)	Yes	No	Yes	
2010	Sex & Drugs & Rock & Roll	Yes	No	No	
2012	Ashes	Yes	No	No	
2012	Spike Island	Yes	No	No	
2016	Oasis: Supersonic	Yes	No	No	
2018	Coldplay: A Head Full of Dreams	Yes	No	No	
2018	Live in São Paulo	Yes	No	No	
2022	The Sound of 007	Yes	No	No	
2026	Ídolos	Yes	No	No	

=== Television ===
Year	Title	Notes	Ref.
2007	Nearly Famous	Episode 1.3 – Episode 1.4	
2008	Spooks: Code 9	Episode 1.3 – Episode 1.4	
2014	Fleming: The Man Who Would Be Bond	Episode 1.1 – Episode 1.4	
2017	Red Nose Day Actually	Co-directed by Richard Curtis	
2018	Vic and Bob's Big Night Out		

=== Music video ===
Year	Artist	Title	Ref.
1999	Coldplay	"Bigger Stronger"	
2008	Coldplay	"Violet Hill" (Dancing Politicians version)	
2008	Coldplay	"Lovers in Japan"	
2008	Coldplay	"Lost!"	
2010	Take That	"The Flood"	
2010	Coldplay	"Christmas Lights"	
2011	Take That	"Kidz" (co-directed with Eran Creevy)	
2011	Coldplay	"Every Teardrop Is a Waterfall"	
2011	Coldplay	"Paradise"	
2011	The Rolling Stones	"No Spare Parts"	
2012	Coldplay	"Charlie Brown"	
2014	Coldplay	"A Sky Full of Stars"	
2015	Coldplay	"Adventure of a Lifetime"	
2017	Take That	"Giants"	
2017	Coldplay	"Something Just Like This" (with The Chainsmokers / Tokyo Remix)	
2019	Coldplay	"Orphans"	
2022	Pink Floyd	"Hey, Hey, Rise Up!"	
2022	Coldplay	"Biutyful"	

== Awards and nominations ==
List of awards and nominations, showing ceremony, year, recipient, category and result
Award	Year (Note: Indicates the year of ceremony. Each year is linked to the article about the awards held that year whenever possible.)	Nominee / Work	Category	Result	Ref.
British Academy Television Awards	2007	The Road to Guantánamo	Best Single Drama	Nominated	
Berlin International Film Festival	2006	The Road to Guantánamo	Golden Bear for Best Motion Picture	Nominated	
Berlin International Film Festival	2006	The Road to Guantánamo	Silver Bear for Best Director	Won	
British Independent Film Awards	2006	The Road to Guantánamo	Best Documentary	Won	
British Independent Film Awards	2006	The Road to Guantánamo	Best Achievement in Production	Nominated	
British Independent Film Awards	2016	Oasis: Supersonic	Best Technical Achievement	Nominated	
Chicago International Film Festival	2010	Moving to Mars	Docufest Competition (Gold Award)	Won	
Empire Awards	2017	Oasis: Supersonic	Best Documentary	Won	
European Film Awards	2006	The Road to Guantánamo	Best Film	Nominated	
European Film Awards	2006	The Road to Guantánamo	Best Director	Nominated	
Independent Spirit Awards	2007	The Road to Guantánamo	Best Documentary Feature Film	Won	
Grierson Awards	2010	Moving to Mars	Best Documentary on a Contemporary Issue	Won	
MTV Europe Music Awards	2020	"Orphans"	Best Rock	Won	
MTV Video Music Awards	2012	"Paradise"	Best Rock Video	Won	
MTV Video Music Awards	2016	"Adventure of a Lifetime"	Best Rock Video	Nominated	
MTV Video Music Awards	2020	"Orphans"	Best Rock Video	Won	
MTV Video Play Awards	2011	"Every Teardrop Is a Waterfall"	Platinum Award	Won	
MTV Video Play Awards	2012	"Paradise"	Platinum Award	Won	
MTV Video Play Awards	2012	"Charlie Brown"	Platinum Award	Won	
MTV Video Music Awards Japan	2012	"Paradise"	Best Group Video	Nominated	
MuchMusic Video Awards	2012	"Paradise"	Best International Video – Group	Nominated	
MuchMusic Video Awards	2016	"Adventure of a Lifetime"	Best International Video – Group	Nominated	
NME Awards	2017	Oasis: Supersonic	Best Music Film	Won	
Satellite Awards	2015	Fleming: The Man Who Would Be Bond	Best Miniseries	Nominated	
UK Music Video Awards	2019	Live in São Paulo	Best Live Concert	Nominated	
