= Studio Killers (album) =

Studio album by Studio Killers
- Released: 14 June 2013
- Recorded: 2011–2012
- Genres: Synth-pop, electropop
- Length: 39:24
- Label: Studio Killers Records
- Producer: Studio Killers

Singles from Studio Killers
- 1. "Ode to the Bouncer" Released: 6 April 2011; 2. "Eros and Apollo" Released: 14 May 2012; 3. "All Men Are Pigs" Released: 14 January 2013; 4. "Jenny" Released: 3 May 2013; 5. "Who Is In Your Heart Now" Released: October 2013

Studio Killers is the debut studio album of electropop virtual band Studio Killers, released digitally on 14 June 2013, and physically on 15 July. An instrumental version of the album was released on 16 December. The songs were written, produced and performed by the group, with Chubby Cherry as vocalist and lyricist and Dyna Mink and Goldie Foxx producing the instrumental beats. The album also features mixing and additional production from James F. Reynolds, additional songwriting from Rob Davis and Chris Smith, and mastering from Dick Beetham and Ted Jensen.

Studio Killers reached number 10 on the Finnish Albums Chart, and also charted on some of the US Billboard album charts. The album fared well critically, with reviewers enjoying both the lyrical and musical content. In 2013, Popmatters listed it number 64 on their list of the "75 Best Albums of 2013". Five singles came from Studio Killers: "Ode to the Bouncer", "Eros and Apollo", "All Men Are Pigs", "Jenny" and "Who Is In Your Heart Now?". "Ode to the Bouncer", the album's lead single, was released in 2011, and was a commercial success in Europe, topping the Dutch Singles Chart and also charting in Belgium, Denmark and Finland. In 2012, the second single from the LP, "Eros and Apollo", was released, and peaked at number four on the Dutch Top 40 tip chart. "Jenny", released in 2013, was popular in Finland, where it reached number two. "All Men Are Pigs" and "Who Is In Your Heart Now?", was also issued in 2013, but were unable to chart.

== Background and composition ==
Studio Killers formed after bandmembers Dyna Mink and Goldie Foxx had a tune to be sent to a girl group in the UK. However, the girl group dropped from their label, and by then the two had nobody to write lyrics for the song or release it. They met up with Chubby Cherry at an international airport, suggesting that she be the track's vocalist and lyricist, thus forming Studio Killers. The tune was used for "Ode to the Bouncer", a single which at that time of making and releasing it they didn't start thinking about making an album yet.

Goldie Foxx and Dyna Mink made the instrumental beats for all the tracks, while Chubby Cherry wrote the melodies and lyrics and performed the vocals. Cherry said the group had originally tried writing together in a studio, but later chose to work from a distance "partly because the studio literally disappeared. We also all felt the urge to go to the other room and send each other stuff by email, which means we spend a lot of time getting lost between places." Additional writing was done on "Eros and Apollo" by Chris Smith and "Jenny" by Rob Davis. Mixing was handled by James F Reynolds, lasting until December 2012, and the songs were later mastered by Dick Beetham at 360 Mastering in New York, with the exception of "Eros and Apollo", which was mastered at Sterling Sound in New York by Ted Jensen.

== Singles ==
Studio Killers spawned five singles. The album's lead single was "Ode to the Bouncer", which was first released in Norway and Sweden on 6 April 2011. The track received positive reviews, and was listed in Spin's "20 Best Songs of the Summer". Its accompanying animated music video, which premiered on 7 April, features Chubby Cherry trying to fight a bouncer to get into a club. In the Netherlands, the song reached number one, and was the anthem of the benefit event Serious Request on the Dutch radio station 3FM in 2011. A version of the song played on the station was released as a separate single, with the subtitle "This One's For Mama Version". It also reached the top 20 in Denmark and Finland, and the Top 30 in the Belgian territory of Flanders.

The second single from Studio Killers, "Eros and Apollo", was released on 14 May 2012, the accompanying music video having been released before on 27 April. While did it not enter the Dutch Top 40 chart, it managed to peak at number 4 on the tip chart. On 14 January 2013, "All Men Are Pigs", the album's third single, was issued, and in Belgium, a radio edit was released separately on 22 February. "Jenny" was chosen as the fourth single off the album, released only in Finland on 3 May. It peaked at number two on the Finnish Singles Chart, and was listed number four on Popmatters' "Ten Best Dance Singles of 2013."

== Release and reception ==
Professional ratings
Review scores
Source	Rating
MuuMuse	4.5/5

Studio Killers was released digitally on 14 June 2013 and physically on 15 July. On 16 December, an instrumental version of the album was issued to digital stores. Upon the album's initial release, music critics gave it positive reviews, with praise going towards the often-humorous lyrics and influential musical content. A MuuMuse writer awarded the LP a rating of 4.5 out of 5, calling it a "solid, cleverly crafted dance-pop with punchy personality and an unusually confident swagger for a debut." In 2013, it was ranked number 64 on Popmatters' "75 Best Albums of 2013", writing that it "dispels the notion that the pop album is a dying breed."

=== Accolades ===
Publication	Country	Accolade	Year	Rank
Popmatters	United States	75 Best Albums of 2013	2013	64

== Track listing ==
All lyrics are written by Chubby Cherry; all music is composed by Goldie Foxx, Dyna Mink.

Studio Killers – Standard edition
No.	Title	Length
1.	"Ode to the Bouncer"	3:27
2.	"Eros and Apollo" (Additional writing by Chris Smith)	3:28
3.	"All Men Are Pigs"	3:47
4.	"Who Is in Your Heart Now?"	4:17
5.	"Friday Night Gurus"	3:41
6.	"Flawless"	3:27
7.	"Jenny" (Additional writing by Ted Jensen)	3:36
8.	"In Tokyo"	3:15
9.	"Funky at Heart"	3:30
10.	"When We Were Lovers"	3:44
11.	"True Colours"	3:11
Total length:		39:24

Studio Killers – 2020 digital edition
No.	Title	Length
7.	"In Tokyo"	3:15
8.	"Funky at Heart"	3:30
9.	"When We Were Lovers"	3:44
10.	"True Colours"	3:11
11.	"Grande Finale" (Jim Eliot, Obese Orange, Chubby Cherry)	3:52
12.	"Dirty Car"	3:44
Total length:		43:29

== Personnel ==
Credits from liner notes:

- Studio Killers – songwriting, production, performer
- Summer Lee – additional vocalist on "In Tokyo"
- Tokyo Toyboy – additional Japanese vocalist on "In Tokyo"
- Le Chien de Paris – accordion on "Jenny"
- Miguel Barradas – steel pans on "Jenny"
- Chris Smith – songwriting on "Eros And Apollo"
- Rob Davis – songwriting on "Jenny"
- James F. Reynolds – mixing
- Dick Beetham – mastering except for "Eros and Apollo"
- Ted Jensen – mastering on "Eros and Apollo"

== Chart positions ==
Chart (2013)	Peak position
Finnish Albums (Suomen virallinen lista)	10
US Independent Albums (Billboard)	39
US Top Current Albums (Billboard)	183
US Top Heatseeker Albums (Billboard)	9
