= Balada (song) =

2011 single by Gusttavo Lima

- Cover of European single release

Single by Gusttavo Lima

from the album Gusttavo Lima e você
- Language: Portuguese
- Released: 21 January 2011
- Genre: Sertanejo universitário
- Length: 3:23
- Label: Som Livre; Universal
- Songwriters: Gusttavo Lima; Cássio Sampaio
- Producers: Maestro Pinocchio; Ivan Miyazato; Gusttavo Lima

Gusttavo Lima singles chronology
"Refém" (2011)	"Balada" (2011)	"Fora do Comum" (2012)

Alternative cover
- "Balada" alternative cover with full title of song

Music video
- "Balada" on YouTube

"Balada" (full title "Balada (Tchê Tcherere Tchê Tchê)", also known as "Balada Boa") is a song by Brazilian artist Gusttavo Lima from his album Gusttavo Lima e você (2011). Written by Gusttavo Lima and Cássio Sampaio, it was released on 21 January 2011, in Brazil through label Som Livre. The song became a success in Brazil: it reached the 3rd position on the Brazilian Billboard Hot 100.

International fame came when the popular song was released worldwide on 13 April 2012, through label Universal. The song became a success in most of Europe, just as Michel Teló's 2011 song "Ai Se Eu Te Pego", becoming a number-one hit in Belgium (Flanders), France, Honduras, Italy, Luxembourg and the Netherlands (13 weeks at number one in the Dutch Top 40, a new record).

== Track listing ==
- Digital download / Promotional CD single
  1. "Balada (Tchê Tcherere Tchê Tchê)" – 3:22
- Tacabro Remix digital download
  1. "Balada (Tchê Tcherere Tchê Tchê)" (Tacabro Remix Radio Edit) – 2:50
  2. "Balada (Tchê Tcherere Tchê Tchê)" (Tacabro Remix) – 4:36
- Regi Remix digital download/CD single
  1. "Balada (Tchê Tcherere Tchê Tchê)" (Regi Remix) – 6:03
  2. "Balada (Tchê Tcherere Tchê Tchê)" (Regi Remix Radio Edit) – 4:07
- Latin Remixes EP
  1. "Balada (Tchê Tcherere Tchê Tchê)" – 3:35
  2. "Balada (Tchê Tcherere Tchê Tchê)" – 5:36
  3. "Balada (Tchê Tcherere Tchê Tchê)" – 3:11
  4. "Balada (Tchê Tcherere Tchê Tchê)" – 4:21
  5. "Balada (Tchê Tcherere Tchê Tchê)" – 5:09
- Italian CD single
  1. "Balada (Tchê Tcherere Tchê Tchê)" (Original Version) – 3:22
  2. "Balada (Tchê Tcherere Tchê Tchê)" (A-Class Edit) – 3:11
  3. "Balada (Tchê Tcherere Tchê Tchê)" (Tacabro Remix Radio Edit) – 2:50
  4. "Balada (Tchê Tcherere Tchê Tchê)" (Club Edit)
  5. "Balada (Tchê Tcherere Tchê Tchê)" (A-Class Floor Mix) – 4:18
  6. "Balada (Tchê Tcherere Tchê Tchê)" (Tacabro Remix) – 4:36
  7. "Balada (Tchê Tcherere Tchê Tchê)" (Sagi Abitbul Remix) – 4:20
  8. "Balada (Tchê Tcherere Tchê Tchê)" (Feeling Valencia Mix)
  9. "Balada (Tchê Tcherere Tchê Tchê)" (Axento Extended Remix)
  10. "Balada (Tchê Tcherere Tchê Tchê)" (Club Mix)
- German Digital EP
  1. "Balada (Tchê Tcherere Tchê Tchê)" – 3:22
  2. "Balada (Tchê Tcherere Tchê Tchê)" (A-Class Edit) – 3:11
  3. "Balada (Tchê Tcherere Tchê Tchê)" (A-Class Floor Mix) – 4:18
  4. "Balada (Tchê Tcherere Tchê Tchê)" (Sagi Abitbul Remix) – 4:20
- German CD single
  1. "Balada (Tchê Tcherere Tchê Tchê)" – 3:22
  2. "Balada (Tchê Tcherere Tchê Tchê)" (A-Class Edit) – 3:11

== Remix featuring Dyland & Lenny ==
"Balada Remix"

Single by Gusttavo Lima featuring Dyland & Lenny
- Released: June 2012
- Recorded: 2012
- Genre: Sertanejo universitário; Latin pop
- Songwriters: Gusttavo Lima, Cássio Sampaio (original); Additional lyrics (Portuguese/Spanish)

After the huge success of "Balada" in France starting April 2012, and attaining #1 in the SNEP charts in June 2012, and only after the single started descending from its top position in France, a new bilingual Portuguese/Spanish version was released in France and United States, with the new release credited to "Gusttavo Lima featuring Dyland & Lenny", being the Puerto-Rican reggaeton artists Carlos Castillo Cruz (known as Dyland) and Julio Manuel González Tavarez (known as Lenny).

The SNEP charts started crediting this bilingual version "Gusttavo Lima featuring Dyland & Lenny" on chart dated week-ending 30 July 2012, after crediting just Gusttavo Lima in all earlier charts.

The duo also has released earlier a version named "Balada Boa" crediting "Dyland & Lenny featuring Gusttavo Lima".

=== Formats ===
- Digital download
  1. "Balada (Tchê Tcherere Tchê Tchê)" – 3:46

== Charts ==
=== Weekly charts ===
Chart (2011–2012)	Peak position
Austria (Ö3 Austria Top 40)	2
Belgium (Ultratop 50 Flanders)	1
Belgium (Ultratop 50 Wallonia)	2
Brazil (Billboard Hot 100)	3
Brazil (Billboard Hot Popular Songs)	1
Czech Republic Airplay (ČNS IFPI)	7
Finland (Suomen virallinen lista)	19
France (SNEP)	1
Germany (GfK)	3
Honduras (Honduras Top 50)	1
Hungary (Dance Top 40)	5
Hungary (Editors' Choice Top 40)	15
Israel International Airplay (Media Forest)	9
Italy (FIMI)	1
Luxembourg Digital Songs (Billboard)	1
Mexico Espanol Airplay (Billboard)	28
Netherlands (Dutch Top 40)	1
Netherlands (Single Top 100)	1
Poland Dance (ZPAV)	1
Portugal Digital Songs (Billboard)	5
Romania (Romanian Top 100)	4
Slovakia Airplay (ČNS IFPI)	13
Spain (Promusicae)	9
Sweden (Sverigetopplistan)	33
Switzerland (Schweizer Hitparade)	1
Ukraine Airplay (TopHit)	22
US Heatseekers Songs (Billboard)	22
US Hot Latin Songs (Billboard)	2
US Latin Airplay (Billboard)	1
US Latin Pop Songs (Billboard)	2
US Tropical Airplay (Billboard)	1
Venezuela Top Latino (Record Report)	9

=== Year-end charts ===
Chart (2011)	Position
Brazil (Billboard Hot 100)	12
Chart (2012)	Position
Austria (Ö3 Austria Top 40)	14
Belgium (Ultratop 50 Flanders)	2
Belgium (Ultratop 50 Wallonia)	12
Brazil (Billboard Hot 100)	37
France (SNEP)	14
Germany (Media Control Charts)	22
Hungary (Dance Top 40)	7
Italy (FIMI)	2
Netherlands (Dutch Top 40)	5
Netherlands (Single Top 100)	3
Poland (ZPAV)	10
Spain (PROMUSICAE)	28
Switzerland (Schweizer Hitparade)	6
Ukraine Airplay (TopHit)	143
US Hot Latin Songs (Billboard)	48
US Latin Pop Songs (Billboard)	15

== Certifications ==
Region	Certification	Certified units/sales
Austria (IFPI Austria)	Platinum	30,000^{*}
Belgium (BRMA)	Platinum	30,000^{*}
Brazil (Pro-Música Brasil)	Platinum	60,000^{‡}
Germany (BVMI)	3× Gold	450,000^{‡}
Italy (FIMI)	5× Platinum	150,000^{*}
Netherlands (NVPI)	2× Platinum	40,000^{^}
Switzerland (IFPI Switzerland)	2× Platinum	60,000^{^}
^{*} Sales figures based on certification alone.^{^} Shipments figures based on certification alone.^{‡} Sales+streaming figures based on certification alone.

== Release history ==
Country	Release date
Brazil	21 January 2011
Worldwide	13 April 2012

== Other versions ==
=== Mikael Del Lago version ===
Mikael Del Lago has released various version of Sertanejo songs including versions of "Balada" on Believe Digital record label as follows:

- Balada (Live 2012)
- Balada Boa (French Live Version)
- Balada (Tribute to Gusttavo Lima) [Version Live]
- Tchê Tcherere Tchê Tchê (French Live Version)
- Tchê Tcherere Tchê Tchê (Tribute to Gusttavo Lima) [Version Live]

Mikael Del Lago's "Tchê tcherere tchê tchê (Tribute to Gusttavo Lima)" reached #164 SNEP French Singles chart in May 2012.

Chart (2012)	Peak position
France (SNEP)	164

=== Karaoke Hits Band version ===
Karaoke Hits Band released its own version entitled "Balada Boa". It reached #114 on SNEP French Singles chart in May 2012.

Chart (2012)	Peak position
France (SNEP)	114

== See also ==
- List of Dutch Top 40 number-one singles of 2012
- List of Ultratop 50 number-one singles of 2012
- List of number-one hits of 2012 (France)
- List of number-one hits of 2012 (Switzerland)
- List of number-one hits of 2012 (Italy)
- List of Billboard number-one Latin songs of 2012
