= Ganzeer =

Egyptian multidisciplinary artist

Ganzeer جنزير
- Born: 1982 (age 43–44); Giza, Egypt
- Known for: Public art, stenciling, street art, installation art, graphic design, product design, comic books, creative writing, lecturing

Ganzeer (Egyptian Arabic: جنزير pronounced [ɡænˈziːɾ], "chain") (born 1982 in Giza) is the pseudonym used by an Egyptian artist who has gained mainstream fame in Egypt and internationally following the 2011 Egyptian Revolution. Prior to the revolution, Ganzeer's work, while recognized, was largely limited to the spheres of art and design. Ganzeer's artwork has touched on the themes of civic responsibility and social justice. Ganzeer means "chain" in Arabic. He is a regular contributor to the online magazine Rolling Bulb. Described by Bidoun Magazine as a "Contingency Artist," Ganzeer is quite accustomed to adopting completely new styles, techniques, and mediums to adapt to the topic he is tackling at any given time. The Huffington Post has placed him on a list of "25 Street Artists from Around the World Who Are Shaking Up Public Art," while Al-Monitor.com has placed him on a list of "50 People Shaping the Culture of the Middle East." He is one of the protagonists in a critically acclaimed documentary titled Art War by German director Marco Wilms. Ganzeer was also cited by German Arte as one of Egypt's highest-selling living artists today.

== Politics and Artistic Genre ==
Political street art was not common in Egypt prior to the 2011 revolution, however it has proliferated in public spaces in the post-revolution era.

Regarding the genre of artistic production in which he participates, Ganzeer has said that "I'm not exactly a graphic designer, nor am I a product designer. I am not particularly a street-artist or comic book artist, nor am I an installation artist, writer, speaker, or video-maker. But I've had the chance to assume one of those roles at different periods of time and in different locations around the world." Indeed, in addition to his better-known street art, Ganzeer has produced artistic content for "magazines, events, projects and musicians." Ganzeer rejects the label of "street artist," having said that "Being called a graffiti artist is something that I'm entirely against. It's not really fair to other real street-artists because I'm not necessarily a street artist, and I don't think in street art terms."

== Artwork ==
In 2011, Ganzeer created a series of murals depicting "martyrs" who were killed during the revolution, calling these "Martyr Murals". Although street art of various forms was being produced during the revolution, these murals fulfilled a public desire to see the martyrs commemorated publicly and instantly. Efforts to remove these murals from public buildings led to the May 2011 "Mad Graffiti Weekend" protest action.

Ganzeer was detained on 26 May 2011, after he was reported for distributing stickers depicting the "Mask of Freedom" image that depicts "a mannequin's torso with head sheathed in a gimp mask decorated with two miniature wings".

Ganzeer has participated in many art exhibits around the globe. In 2011, he participated in a Toronto exhibition titled Cairo 20x20. The exhibition was held at The Mascot Café and Art Gallery and the theme was a look into the capital city of Egypt as portrayed by 20 contemporary Egyptian artists and designers. Each person was given a 20x20 cm canvas and asked to portray what their city meant to them, using any medium. The 20 also included Ibraheem Youssef, Ahmed Hafez, Mahmoud Hamdy, Ahmed Foula and Ibrahim Eslam.

== Comics ==
Ganzeer has also created a few comics, including his debut graphic novel The Solar Grid (2019).

== Exhibitions ==
This Should be Made Public – Goethe Institut, Cairo, Egypt – 2007
Everyday Heroes – Townhouse Onsite, Cairo, Egypt – 2007
The One Minutes – Rawabet Theatre, Cairo, Egypt – 2008
Tashkeel Gallery, Dubai, Cairo, Egypt – 2008
Urban Artists – Tashkeel Gallery, Dubai, UAE – 2008
Art Threesome – Foundation B.A.D, Rotterdam, The Netherland – 2008
Cairoscape – Uqbar, Berlin, Germany – 2008
Radius of Art – Kiel, Germany – 2008
Up Yours – Kran Film, Brussels, Belgium – 2008
Shatana International Workshop – Shatana, Jordan – 2009
Why Not? – Palace of the Arts, Cairo, Egypt – 2010
Noord – Mediamatic, Amsterdam, the Netherlands – 2010
Cairo Documenta – Hotel Viennoise, Cairo, Egypt – 2010
Meet Phool launch – Darb1718, Cairo, Egypt – 2011
Cairo 20x20 – The Mascot Gallery, Toronto, Canada – 2011
Arabic Graffiti & Egyptian Street Art – Tutankhamun Exhibition, Frankfurt, Germany −2012
Katowice Street-Art Festival – Katowice, Poland – 2012
Expressoes da Revolucaode – Contra Cultura, Porto Alegre, Brazil – 2012
Newtopia: The State of Human Rights – Museum Hof Van Busleyden, Mechelen, Belgium −2012
Theatrefestival Basel – Kaserne Basel, Basel, Switzerland – 2012
Ruptures: Forms of Public Address – The Cooper Union School of Art, NYC, USA – 2012
The Virus is Spreading – Safarkhan Art Gallery, Cairo, Egypt – 2012
Left-to-Right – Kunstquartier Bethanien, Berlin, Germany – 2012
What Are You Doing Drawing? – Nile Sunset Annex, Cairo, Egypt – 2013
Open Sesame – Apexart, NYC, USA – 2013
Face the Vitrine—D-CAF – Cairo, Egypt – 2013
(K)harya "Freedom or Shit" – Hotel Viennoise, Cairo, Egypt – 2013
Back to Square 1 – Forumbox, Helsinki, Finland – 2013
Alwan Festival – Al Riwaq Art Space, Adilya, Bahrain – 2014

Urban Art Biennial—Völklingen—2015

All American By Ganzeer—Leila Heller Gallery, New York—2015

== Publications ==
Arabesque – by Ben Wittner, Sascha Thoma, Nicholas Bourquin – Gestalten, Berlin, Germany – 2008
Ruins of the Future – by George Azmy and Ganzeer – Contemporary Image Collective, Cairo, Egypt – 2008
From the End – by Ganzeer – Self-Published, Cairo, Egypt – 2009
Arabesque 2 – by Ben Wittner and Sascha Thoma – Gestalten, Berlin, Germany – 2011
Wall Talk: Graffiti of the Egyptian Revolution – by Sherif Boraie – Zeitouna, Cairo, Egypt – 2012
Revolution Graffiti – by Mia Grondahl – AUC Press, Cairo, Egypt – 2013
Newtopia: The State of Human Rights – by Katerina Gregos and Elena Sorokina – Ludion, Antwerp, Belgium
The Apartment in Bab El Louk – by Donia Maher, Ganzeer, and Ahmad Nady – Merit Publishing, Cairo, Egypt – 2014
Walls of Freedom – by Don Stone and Basma Hamdy – From Here to Fame Publishing, Berlin, Germany – 2014

== Presentations, lectures and debates ==
Ganzeer has given a number of public lectures around the world on art and design. These presentations are often described by participants as semi-performative, high on humor, very informative and ultimately engaging.

Art-Threesome – Foundation B.a.d, Rotterdam, Netherlands – 2008
Pecha Kucha Night – Off Corso, Rotterdam, Netherlands – 2008
Going Dutch, Habibi – Contemporary Image Collective, Cairo, Egypt – 2008
Medrar's 14th Open Meeting – Medrar, Cairo, Egypt – 2009
Visual Pollution in the Middle East – Nuqat Conference, Kuwait – 2010
TweetNadwa – Tahrir Square, Cairo, Egypt – 2011
Cairo Institute for Human Rights, Seminar No. 18 – Cairo, Egypt – 2011
Culture in Action: A debate between Ganzeer, Guy Sorman, and Rachida Triki – European Culture Congress, Wrocław, Poland – 2011
Internews Conferences – Portemilio, Lebanon – 2011
Social Media & Street-Art – Sanaye3 House, Beirut, Lebanon – 2011
Forum Liberation de Lyon – Lyon, France – 2011
Horreya Tour – Berlin, Hamburg, Bremen, and Cologne, Germany – 2012
Street-Art and Political Protest Culture – Right-to-Left, Berlin, Germany – 2012
The War of Art / HIAP Talks – Helsinki, Finland – 2013
Re:Public – Kiasma Museum, Helsinki, Finland – 2013
Seminar: We Are Open – Checkpoint Helsinki, Kiasma Museum, Helsinki, Finland – 2013
Art & The Political – D-CAF, AUC, Cairo, Egypt – 2014
Alwan Festival Talks – Al Riwaq Art Space, Adilya, Bahrain – 2014

== See also ==
- El Teneen
- Keizer (artist)
- List of urban artists
- Chico (Egyptian artist)
- Contemporary art in Egypt
