= Jenny (Studio Killers song) =

Single by Studio Killers

from the album Studio Killers
- Released: 3 May 2013
- Genre: House; Europop
- Length: 3:35
- Label: Warner Music Finland; Studio Killers Records
- Songwriters: Studio Killers, Rob Davis
- Producer: Studio Killers

Studio Killers singles chronology
"All Men Are Pigs" (2013)	"Jenny" (2013)	"Who Is in Your Heart Now?" (2013)

2020 re-release
- "Jenny (I Wanna Ruin Our Friendship)" 2020 re-release cover

Music video
- "Jenny" on YouTube

"Jenny", also titled "Jenny (I Wanna Ruin Our Friendship)", is a song written, produced and performed by the virtual band Studio Killers, released 3 May 2013 as the fourth single from their self-titled debut studio album. Played in the key of G# minor, the song, inspired by singer Chubby Cherry's crush on a person named Jenny, discusses a girl falling in love with her best friend and doing things such as stealing her lipstick and using her shirt as a pillow case. The single was a number-two hit on the Finnish Singles Chart, and was received positively by critics. A remix featuring German singer Kim Petras was released on 26 March 2021.

== Production and composition ==
Studio Killers wrote, produced and performed "Jenny", with additional songwriting done by Rob Davis. Goldie Foxx and Dyna Mink made the instrumental beat, while Chubby Cherry wrote the melody and lyrics and performed the vocals. According to Chubby Cherry, this was one of the songs she wrote before forming Studio Killers. And was inspired by a crush Cherry had on a person named Jenny. She said the lyrics "sort of changed along the way because [Goldie Foxx and Dyna Mink] added some of their feelings with my feelings and it became kind of intriguing." About the song having to do with lesbian relationships, the most discussed topic in Finland at the time the song was released, the group thought "it should be nothing to shy away from." Lyrically the song describes a relationship with two women, in which one of them, Jenny, has a boyfriend. According to Popmatters writer Ryan Lathan, "it appears her dearest pal is stealing things out of her room and sleeping with her shirt as if it were a pillowcase. [The narrator] then is suggesting Jenny "forget those amigos" and shack up with her."

Described by a Scandipop writer as a more "straightforward," less eccentric pop song than previous Studio Killer singles, "Jenny" is a "half Europop, half commercial house" steel drum-filled track, with "a little bit of a Caribbean-meets-Mediterranean flair". The original track includes an accordion performed by Le Chien de Paris and steel drums played by Miguel Barradas. The song was mixed by James F. Reynolds, and later mastered by Dick Beetham at 360 Mastering in London. The track lasts for three minutes and 36 seconds, and is performed in B major at a tempo of 134 beats per minute. Writers noted the song's similar groove to Edward Maya's "Stereo Love".

== Release and reception ==
"Jenny" is the seventh track from Studio Killers' self-titled debut album, and was issued as the fourth album's single, the third in Finland. The band released a two-minute preview of the song on their official SoundCloud page on 1 May. The single was released on 3 May to digital music stores in Finland by Warner Music, and later a CD promotional single came out on 11 May in Finland by Studio Killers Records. The song debuted at number 18 on the Finnish Singles Chart, reaching number two on the chart, as well as peaking number three on both Finland's download chart and Billboard's Finland Digital Songs chart. Upon its release, "Jenny" was called by critics "an obvious must-listen for your beach (and/or light stalking) playlists", "this summer's surprise hit waiting to happen," and "another hit out of the park for Studio Killers". It is lead vocalist Chubby Cherry's favorite track off of Studio Killers, with her saying that it "holds a personal place in my heart." In 2019, Billboard included the song in its list of the "30 Lesbian Love Songs".

In September 2020, TikTok user @isaac..thebully posted the first video of what became an internet challenge video trend titled "Darling You're My Best Friend," known by its hashtag #RuinOurFriendship; each video involves a subject talking with a friend or stranger (in-person or via text or Snapchat) with the following snippet from "Jenny" as the soundtrack. As of 30 November 2020, more than 359,000 videos used the song, and videos with the #RuinOurFriendship hashtag garnered more than 41.3 million views combined.

== Music video ==
The music video for the song was released on 24 December 2015, as a Christmas gift to fans and was animated by Eliza Jäppinen. The music video features Chubby Cherry and Jenny driving to a dance club. Once they are there Chubby Cherry posts "(Jenny's Boyfriend's) head is small." Once this happens, Cherry tells Jenny that they should be lovers and soon they run away together. In this video, Cherry did not sing during the video except for the bridge.

A lyric video was released 5 years later in 2020. It shows the lyrics in a messaging-like app with the lyrics written to Cherry's account.

== Accolades ==
Accolades for "Jenny"
Publication	Accolade	Year	Rank
PopMatters	The Ten Best Dance Singles of 2013	2013	4

== Personnel ==
Credits from liner notes of Studio Killers:

- Studio Killers – songwriting, production, performer
- Le Chien de Paris – accordion
- Miguel Barradas – steel drums
- Rob Davis – songwriting
- James F. Reynolds – mixing
- Dick Beetham – mastering

== Charts ==
=== Weekly charts ===
Chart (2013)	Peak position
Finland (Suomen virallinen lista)	2
Chart (2020–21)	Peak position
Austria (Ö3 Austria Top 40)	56
Belgium (Ultratip Bubbling Under Flanders)	23
Belgium Dance (Ultratop Wallonia)	49
Germany (GfK)	81
Ireland (IRMA)	85
Sweden Heatseeker (Sverigetopplistan)	9
UK Indie (Official Charts)	15
US Hot Dance/Electronic Songs (Billboard)	7

=== Year-end charts ===
Chart (2021)	Position
US Hot Dance/Electronic Songs (Billboard)	29

== Certifications ==
Certifications for "Jenny"
Region	Certification	Certified units/sales
Canada (Music Canada)	Gold	40,000^{‡}
New Zealand (RMNZ)	Gold	15,000^{‡}
United Kingdom (BPI)	Silver	200,000^{‡}
United States (RIAA)	Gold	500,000^{‡}
^{‡} Sales+streaming figures based on certification alone.

== Release history ==
Release history for "Jenny"
Country	Date	Format	Version	Label	Reference
Finland	3 May 2013	Digital download	Original	Warner Music Finland	
Finland	11 May 2013	CD	Original	Studio Killers Records	
Various	14 June 2013	Digital download; streaming	Original	Atlantic, Warner Music Finland	
Various	10 February 2021	Digital download; streaming	Faustix Remix	Atlantic, Warner Music Finland	
Various	26 March 2021	Digital download; streaming	Kim Petras Remix	Atlantic, Warner Music Finland	
