= Banging on the Doors of Love =

Studio album by Sandra van Nieuwland
- Released: 22 November 2013
- Genre: Pop
- Length: 38:07 (41:33)
- Label: 8Ball Music

Sandra van Nieuwland chronology
| And More (2012) | Banging on the Doors of Love (2013) |

Singles from Banging on the Doors of Love
- 1. "Hunter" Released: 3 August 2013; 2. "Always Alone" Released: 8 November 2013

Banging on the Doors of Love is the second studio album by Dutch singer-songwriter Sandra van Nieuwland. It was released in The Netherlands by 8ball Music on 22 November 2013.

== Singles ==
"Hunter" was released as the first single on 3 August 2013. "Always Alone" was released as the second single on 8 November 2013. Both songs were written by Van Nieuwland, Tjeerd Bomhof and Mathias Janmaat.

== Track listing ==
1. "Hunter" – 3:03
2. "Always Alone" – 3:24
3. "Banging on the Doors of Love" – 3:15
4. "Oxygen" – 3:10
5. "Empty Hands" – 2:47
6. "Snooze Away" – 3:13
7. "Tidy & Quiet" – 2:39
8. "Love to Love" – 2:55
9. "Guilty Trip" – 3:11
10. "Happy" – 3:16
11. "Sunlight" – 3:52
12. "Wait or Forget" – 3:31

Digipack and iTunes edition
| No. | Title | Length |
|---|---|---|
| 13. | "Hunter (Acoustic)" | 3:26 |
