= Every Teardrop Is a Waterfall =

2011 single by Coldplay

Single by Coldplay

from the album Mylo Xyloto
- B-side: "Major Minus"; "Moving to Mars"
- Released: 3 June 2011
- Genre: Arena rock
- Length: 4:01 (album version); 4:03 (single version)
- Label: Parlophone; Capitol
- Songwriters: Peter Allen; Adrienne Anderson; Guy Berryman; Jonny Buckland; Harry Castioni; Will Champion; Alex Christensen; Brian Eno; B Lagonda; Chris Martin; Wycombe
- Producers: Markus Dravs; Daniel Green; Rik Simpson

Coldplay singles chronology
"Christmas Lights" (2010)	"Every Teardrop Is a Waterfall" (2011)	"Paradise" (2011)

EP cover

Coldplay EP chronology
Prospekt's March (2008)	Every Teardrop Is a Waterfall (2011)	iTunes Festival: London 2011 (2011)

Music video
- "Every Teardrop Is a Waterfall" on YouTube

"Every Teardrop Is a Waterfall" is a song by British rock band Coldplay. It was released as the lead single for their fifth studio album Mylo Xyloto on 3 June 2011. An exclusive digital EP version of it, with the B-sides "Major Minus" and "Moving to Mars", came out in the following weeks; the release is considered the band's eighth extended play. The track contains elements of the 1976 song "I Go to Rio" written by Peter Allen and Adrienne Anderson. It debuted at number 29 on the Billboard Hot 100 in the United States, selling 85,000 copies in its first week before climbing to its peak of number 14. On the UK Singles Chart, the song peaked at number 6.

Its radio debut happened on BBC Radio 1, BBC Radio 2, BBC 6 Music, Absolute Radio, and Xfm. Coldplay first performed the song live on 4 June at the Rock am Ring and Rock im Park festival in Nürnberg, Germany. They also played it at the Steve Jobs memorial event at Apple headquarters on 19 October 2011 in Cupertino, California, and at the opening of the MTV European Music Awards in Belfast, Northern Ireland on 6 November 2011.

The track was used as the theme for the live-action film adaptation of Chūya Koyama's Uchū Kyōdai (Space Brothers) manga and scored two nominations at the 54th Grammy Awards, one for Best Rock Performance and the other for Best Rock Song.

== Inspiration ==
When the song was first released on Coldplay's YouTube channel, it sparked many negative comments in the comment section, saying the song was plagiarised from "Ritmo de la noche" by 1990s-era German group Chocolate, or from Peter Allen's "I Go to Rio". However, upon release of the song, the line "Every Teardrop Is a Waterfall contains elements of I Go To Rio written by Peter Allen and Adrienne Anderson" was noted below the official lyrics to the song on Coldplay's website. The Oracle (Coldplay's web site Question and Answer section) responded on 9 June 2011 to a question raised concerning its inspiration and collaboration:

I don't think people are quite understanding the song's composition. To clarify: Chris was inspired to write Every Teardrop Is a Waterfall after hearing some chords in a nightclub scene in Alejandro González Iñárritu's film Biutiful (2010). The chords in the film are part of a track that is based on I Go To Rio written by Peter Allen and Adrienne Anderson, released by Peter Allen in 1976. If you look at a clip on YouTube you'll hear the chords for yourself. As for other people asking if Ritmo de la Noche by The Sacados should also be credited the answer is "no". Firstly, that is a cover of Chocolate's song by the same name who sampled I Go To Rio. Secondly, they both came later in 1990 so hopefully they should have credited Peter & Adrienne.

This marked Coldplay's second time using samples to write a song, having first used Kraftwerk's "Computer Love" for "Talk" (2005).

== Critical reception ==
"Every Teardrop Is a Waterfall" received generally positive reviews from critics. The Boston Herald gave a positive review, saying "Chris Martin does it again. He gives force to wimp music, beauty to base pop and the world another Coldplay anthem. Basically, the boys are joyous, and so is this stadium-rock track. 'I turn the music up, I got my records on, I shut the world outside until the lights come on' Martin sings over buoyant synths, ringing guitar and big drums. You can feel the love".

Rolling Stone gave the song a three and a half stars rating out of five commenting "Chris Martin says Coldplay's upcoming album is influenced by old-school New York graffiti, and in a recent photo the bandmates are dressed in neon chillwear like they just walked off the set of Breakin' 3: A Brit-Pop Odyssey. But the first single doesn't go for the sound of early hip-hop so much as its sense of year-zero possibility. Over a rave-tinged keyboard melody, leavened by producer Brian Eno's rainforest-of-the-soul ambiance, Martin sings of kids dancing until morning and heaven inside his headphones. When the drums kick in fully, it moves like "Sunday Bloody Sunday" by way of the Velvets' "Sunday Morning," a flag-waving ode to change-as-inspiration: "I'd rather be a comma than a full stop," Martin sings. Coming from a guy whose critics take him for a human exclamation point, it's a welcome sentiment."

MTV praised the song by declaring that "Modern rock behemoths Coldplay just previewed the first single off their upcoming Brian Eno-produced fifth studio album, and it's every bit as soaring as we've come to expect from the band". They also said that "In any case, 'Every Teardrop Is a Waterfall' has major summer smash potential, so teary waterfalls, be gone, Coldplay!". In his review for About.com, Bill Lamb rated the song with four stars out of five and commented that "The overall effect of this song is Coldplay moving forward into new explorations while keeping the elements that endear them to their fans wholly intact. 'Every Teardrop Is a Waterfall' is unlikely to be hailed as an instant classic to match the very best of Coldplay's past work, but a strong argument could be made that the band has never released their best material as the first single from any of their albums".

=== Rankings ===
List of critic rankings
Publication	Year	Description	Result	Ref.
Boston Herald	2011	The Top 111 Songs of 2011	47	
New York Post	2011	Musical Tweets 2011	37	
NPO Radio 2	2011	Top 2000	248	
Popjustice	2011	The Top 45 Singles of 2011	Placed	
PopMatters	2011	The 75 Best Songs of 2011	57	
Rolling Stone	2019	100 Best Songs of the 2010s	100	
YouGov UK	2011	Best Songs of 2011	14	

== Music video ==
Screenshot from the music video, which shows the band playing across various backdrops sprayed with colourful graffiti paint.

The video was released to the public on 28 June 2011. It shows the band playing across various backdrops sprayed with colourful graffiti painted by the band's artist "Paris". The video was shot between 14 and 15 June 2011 at Millennium Mills in east London, close to London City Airport, but begins with a shot of the Downtown Los Angeles skyline. The music video, which features the band, uses a stop motion technique and was directed by Mat Whitecross, who has worked with the band since 1999 and was responsible for the videos for "Lovers in Japan" and "Christmas Lights", among others. The video was edited by Nick Allix of The Whitehouse Post based in London Soho.

The video received positive reviews by critics who noted its colourful visual. Rolling Stone said: "The vibrant, colorful clip is well-suited to the song, which has a shaky, excited energy and the sort of optimistic, romantic lyrics that have made Coldplay one of the world's most crowd-pleasing rock bands". The New York Post wrote "the clip proves that the boys are just as interested in pushing boundaries with their videos as they are with their music."

== Covers and remixes ==
Swedish singer Robyn covered the song in July 2011. Swedish House Mafia played their remix during many of their shows during 2011 and 2012; the remix was well received by most critics and fans. It was included on the Swedish House Mafia's album, Until Now, with the artist's name listed as 'Coldplay vs. Swedish House Mafia' with the title as in the original, rather than putting on a remix credit. The song has also been remixed by Swedish DJ Avicii.

== Track listing ==
Digital download
No.	Title	Length
1.	"Every Teardrop Is a Waterfall"	4:03

CD single
No.	Title	Length
1.	"Every Teardrop Is a Waterfall"	4:03
2.	"Major Minus"	3:30

Digital download – EP
No.	Title	Length
1.	"Every Teardrop Is a Waterfall"	4:03
2.	"Major Minus"	3:30
3.	"Moving to Mars"	4:19

Digital download - live version
No.	Title	Length
1.	"Every Teardrop Is a Waterfall" (Live from Glastonbury, 2011)	4:38

== Personnel ==
Credits adapted from the CD liner notes.

- Guy Berryman – bass guitar, keyboards, songwriter
- Jonny Buckland – electric guitar, backing vocals, songwriter
- Will Champion – backing vocals, acoustic guitar, drums, songwriter
- Chris Martin – lead vocals, acoustic guitar, songwriter
- Peter Allen – songwriter
- Adrienne Anderson – songwriter
- Markus Dravs – producer
- Daniel Green – producer and mixing
- Rik Simpson – producer and mixing
- Mark 'Spike' Stent – mixing
- Davide Rossi – strings
- Jon Hopkins – additional programming
- Brian Eno – "enoxification" and additional composition

== Charts ==
=== Weekly charts ===
Weekly chart performance
Chart (2011–2012)	Peak position
Australia (ARIA)	14
Austria (Ö3 Austria Top 40)	21
Belgium (Ultratop 50 Flanders)	4
Belgium (Ultratop 50 Wallonia)	3
Canada Hot 100 (Billboard)	9
Canada (Canadian rock/alternative chart)	5
Czech Republic Airplay (ČNS IFPI)	69
Denmark (Tracklisten)	8
Finland (Suomen virallinen lista)	16
France (SNEP)	20
Germany (GfK)	24
Hungary (Editors' Choice Top 40)	32
Iceland (RÚV)	1
Ireland (IRMA)	9
Israel (Media Forest)	9
Italy (FIMI)	3
Italy Airplay (EarOne)	1
Japan Hot 100 (Billboard)	6
Luxembourg (Billboard)	5
Mexico Ingles Airplay	5
Netherlands (Dutch Top 40)	4
Netherlands (Single Top 100)	1
New Zealand (Recorded Music NZ)	13
Norway (VG-lista)	8
Scottish Singles Sales (Official Charts)	5
Slovakia Airplay (ČNS IFPI)	18
South Korea (Gaon)	43
South Korea International (Gaon)	1
Spain (Promusicae)	4
Spain (Airplay Chart)	6
Sweden (Sverigetopplistan)	47
Switzerland (Schweizer Hitparade)	6
UK Singles (Official Charts)	6
US Billboard Hot 100	14
US Adult Alternative Airplay (Billboard)	1
US Adult Contemporary (Billboard)	23
US Adult Pop Airplay (Billboard)	8
US Alternative Airplay (Billboard)	4
US Hot Rock & Alternative Songs (Billboard)	5
US Pop Airplay (Billboard)	25

=== Monthly charts ===
Monthly chart performance
Chart (2011)	Peak position
South Korea International (Gaon)	3

=== Year-end charts ===
Year-end chart performance
Chart (2011)	Position
Belgium (Ultratop Flanders)	30
Belgium (Ultratop Wallonia)	49
Canada (Canadian Hot 100)	88
France (SNEP)	47
Italy (Musica e dischi)	37
Italy Airplay (EarOne)	1
Japan (Japan Hot 100)	22
Netherlands (Dutch Top 40)	46
Netherlands (Single Top 100)	37
South Korea International (Gaon)	76
Spain (Promusicae)	40
Switzerland (Schweizer Hitparade)	71
UK Singles (OCC)	83
US Adult Top 40 (Billboard)	28
US Hot Rock Songs (Billboard)	23
US Alternative Songs (Billboard)	27
US Triple A (Billboard)	12

== Certifications and sales ==
Certifications and sales
Region	Certification	Certified units/sales
Australia (ARIA)	Platinum	70,000^{^}
Belgium (BRMA)	Gold	15,000^{*}
Italy (FIMI)	Platinum	30,000^{*}
New Zealand (RMNZ)	Platinum	30,000^{‡}
South Korea	—	323,970 (Note: South Korean year-end digital sales for "Every Teardrop Is a Waterfall" in 2011.)
Spain (Promusicae)	Gold	30,000^{‡}
Switzerland (IFPI Switzerland)	Gold	15,000^{^}
United Kingdom (BPI)	Platinum	600,000^{‡}
Streaming
Denmark (IFPI Danmark)	Gold	50,000^{†}
^{*} Sales figures based on certification alone.^{^} Shipments figures based on certification alone.^{‡} Sales+streaming figures based on certification alone.^{†} Streaming-only figures based on certification alone.

== Release history ==
Release dates and formats
Region	Date	Format	Label
Italy	3 June 2011	Contemporary hit radio	Warner Music
United States	3 June 2011	Digital download	Parlophone
United Kingdom	5 June 2011	Digital download	Parlophone
United States	13 June 2011	Modern rock radio	Capitol
United States	20 June 2011	Hot adult contemporary radio	Capitol
United States	21 June 2011	Contemporary hit radio	Capitol
Worldwide	26 June 2011	Digital download bundle	Parlophone
United Kingdom	26 June 2011	Compact disc	Parlophone
United Kingdom	26 June 2011	7"	Parlophone
France	4 July 2011	Compact disc	EMI

== See also ==
- List of number-one singles of 2011 (Netherlands)
- List of number-one international songs of 2011 (South Korea)
- List of UK top-ten singles in 2011
- List of Billboard number-one adult alternative singles of the 2010s
