= Oasis: Supersonic =

2016 film by Mat Whitecross

- British release poster
- Directed by: Mat Whitecross
- Produced by: Asif Kapadia; James Gay-Rees
- Starring: Oasis
- Music by: Oasis
- Production companies: Mint Pictures; Nemperor; On The Corner Films
- Distributed by: Entertainment One; Lorton Distribution
- Release date: 2 October 2016
- Running time: 122 minutes
- Country: United Kingdom
- Language: English
- Box office: $1.6 million

Oasis: Supersonic is a 2016 British music documentary film directed by Mat Whitecross about the English rock band Oasis. Asif Kapadia and James Gay-Rees, already awarded an Academy Award for the film Amy, worked on this film respectively as executive producer and film producer. The film was released on 2 October 2016, and was distributed in the UK by Entertainment One and Lorton Distribution, and in the US by A24.

== Synopsis ==
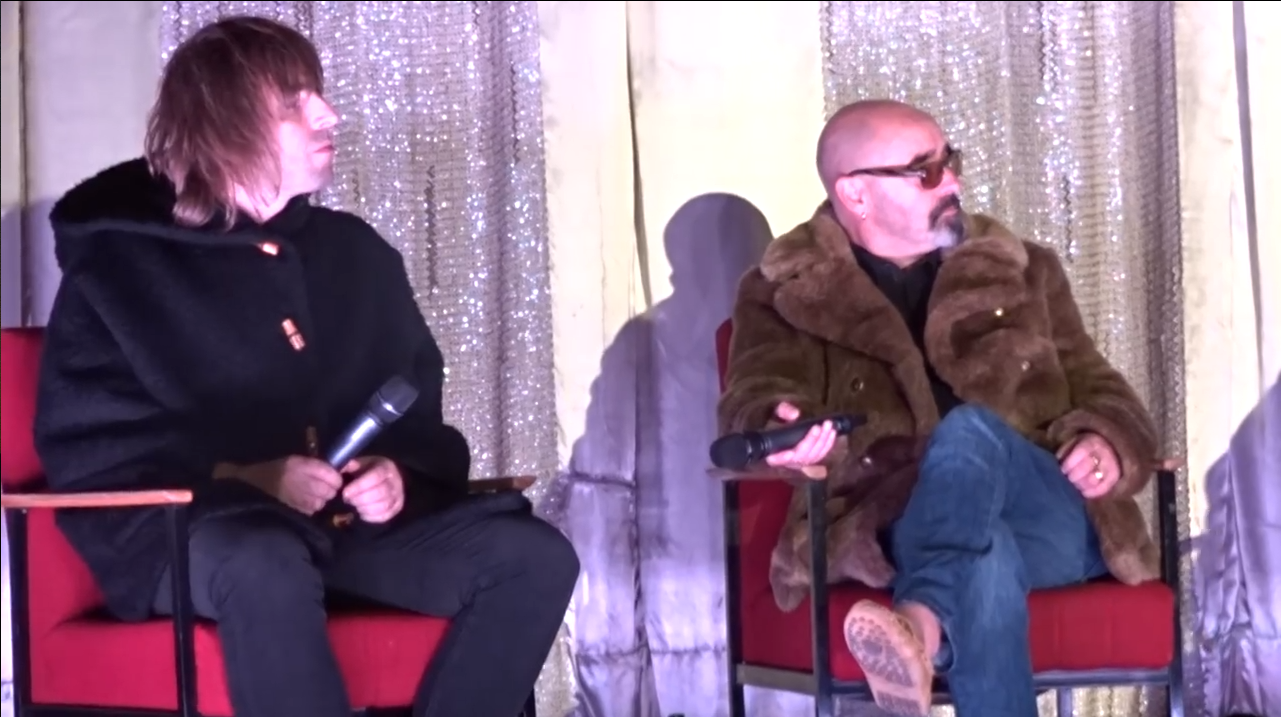
Liam Gallagher and Paul "Bonehead" Arthurs at the Berlin premiere of Supersonic in 2016

The film details the history of the rock band Oasis during their formative years in Manchester and the height of their success in the 1990s during the era of the Britpop movement, featuring off-screen interviews with members of the band, including Noel and Liam Gallagher, as well as people associated with them, set to archive video of concerts, contemporaneous interviews and backstage footage.

== Reception ==
=== Box office ===
Oasis: Supersonic opened in theatres for 16 days. It has grossed $242,867 in the United States and Canada and $1.2 million in other countries for a worldwide total of $1.5 million, and sales of its DVD/Blu-ray releases have cashed $182,049.

=== Critical response ===
Oasis: Supersonic received positive reviews from critics. On review aggregator Rotten Tomatoes, the film has an approval rating of 84%, based on 56 reviews, with an average score of 7.2/10. The website's critical consensus reads, "Oasis: Supersonic forgoes a comprehensive approach to its multi-platinum subjects in favor of an appreciative—and stirring—look at their heady early years." On Metacritic, the film has a score of 71 out of 100, based on 16 critics, indicating "generally favorable reviews".

In a positive review, David Ehrlich of IndieWire praised the documentary's insight into Liam and Noel's relationship, describing it as "a poignant and insightful look into one of the most openly fractious sibling rivalries of our time." The Guardian's Peter Bradshaw gave the film three out of five stars, criticising the absence of the group's post-1996 period, as well as the disregarding of their chart battle with Blur in 1995, Noel's endorsement of Tony Blair, and the band's decline in popularity. Brian Tallerico expressed similar sentiments in a review for RogerEbert.com, giving it two and a half out of four stars. He summarised: "While Oasis: Supersonic is never boring, especially for fans, it's also not quite deep enough to justify its narrow focus, especially at its overlong running time."

== Certifications ==
Region	Certification	Certified units/sales
United Kingdom (BPI)	4× Platinum	200,000^{*}
^{*} Sales figures based on certification alone.
