= Ode to the Bouncer =

Single by Studio Killers

from the album Studio Killers
- Released: 6 April 2011
- Recorded: 2011
- Genre: Electropop, house
- Length: 3:26
- Label: Studio Killers
- Songwriter: Studio Killers
- Producers: Studio Killers, James F. Reynolds

Studio Killers singles chronology
"Ode to the Bouncer" (2011)	"Eros & Apollo" (2012)

Music video
- "Ode to the Bouncer" on YouTube

"Ode to the Bouncer" is a song written, performed and produced by electropop group Studio Killers. The energetic three-minute and 26-second dance-pop song, which plays in the key of F-sharp major, tells the story of somebody trying to enter a venue to dance but being prevented by a bouncer from doing so. Break beats, synth loops and vocals are depicted in the song's arrangement. Dyna Mink and Goldie Foxx composed the tune, while the lyrics were made by vocalist Cherry.

The single was first issued on 6 April 2011 as the lead single from Studio Killers' self-titled debut studio album, which was later released in 2013. The music video was released on 7 April. The single was the most successful in the Netherlands, where it was number one on charts such as the Dutch Top 40 and Mega Single Top 100 and went gold. It also made several chart appearances in Denmark, Finland, and Belgium. The song has been met with positive critical reviews, with praise going towards the song's production and arrangement. It became the anthem of benefit event Serious Request on the Dutch radio station 3FM in 2011, and appeared on Spin's "20 Best Songs of the Summer" that same year.

== Production and composition ==
Studio Killers formed after bandmembers Dyna Mink and Goldie Foxx had a tune to be sent to a girl group in the United Kingdom. However, the girl group dropped from their label, and by then the two had nobody to write lyrics for the song or release it. They met up with Chubby Cherry at an international airport, suggesting that she be the track's vocalist and lyricist, thus forming Studio Killers. The tune was used for "Ode to the Bouncer". Dyna Mink played the keyboards, which were programmed by Goldie Foxx, and Chubby Cherry was vocalist. James F. Reynolds mixed the song and handled additional production, while Dick Beetham mastered it at 360 Mastering in London.

"Ode to the Bouncer" is an energetic electropop dance-pop track with influences of Giorgio Moroder, Vince Clarke, Daft Punk and ABBA. The piece is in the key of F♯ Mixolydian, and plays for 3 minutes and 26 seconds at a tempo of 123 beats per minute. Lyrically, the song depicts a woman trying to get into a nightclub by complaining that she's cold, claiming that it's her birthday and she has friends inside, pointing out that she isn't wearing inappropriate shoes and implying that she isn't wearing any underwear, only for the bouncer to continue to refuse her entrance. She then begins insulting the "empowered and aroused" bouncer and the song eventually culminates with her sneaking into the club through the ladies' room window. The production includes "skipping break beats" and "synth loops", and Scandipop.co.uk described it as "a cross between PWL or Pete Hammond back in the 80′s [sic], and modern day Scandinavian electro acts like Eva & The Heartmaker or Electric Lady Lab."

== Release ==
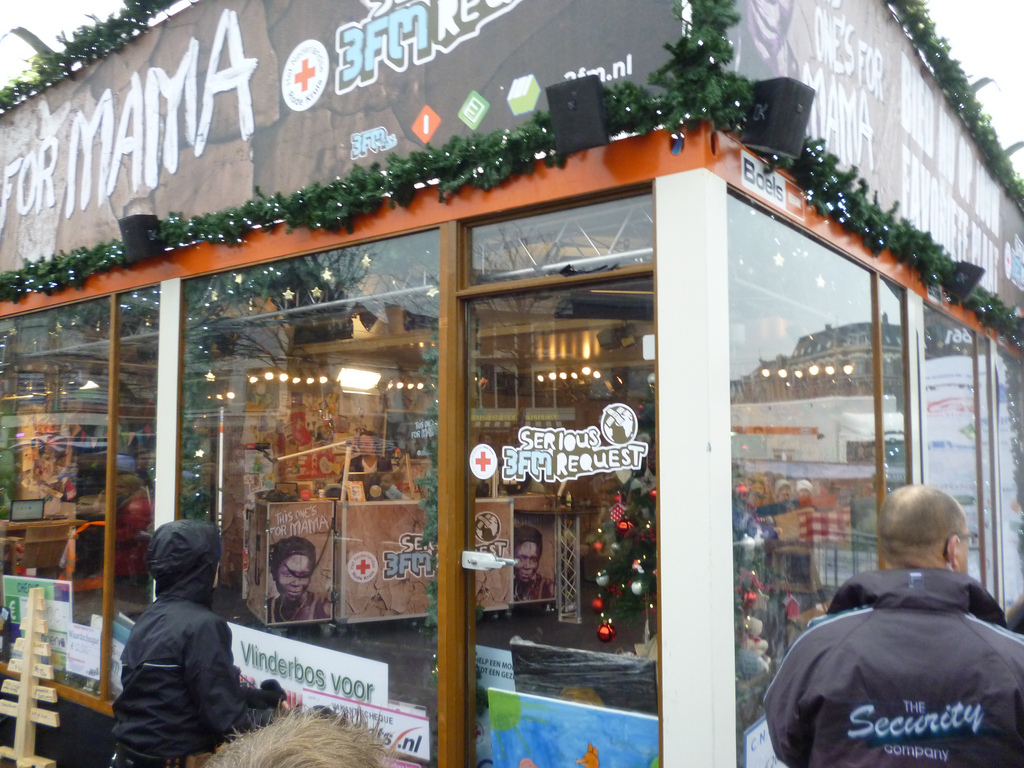
"Ode to the Bouncer" was the anthem of the 2011 Serious Request event.

A music video for "Ode to the Bouncer" premiered on 7 April 2011. The animated video depicts Cherry trying to fight a bouncer to get into a club. The song was released as the lead single for the group's self-titled debut album, where it appears as the first track. The single was first issued in Norway and Sweden on 6 April 2011. It was later released on 2 May 2011 in Denmark, before premiering in the United Kingdom, United States and Finland later that year.

The song reached number one on record charts in the Netherlands: the Digital Songs, Dutch Top 40, Mega Dance Top 30, Mega Top 50 and Single Top 100. It also appeared on record charts in Denmark, Finland and Belgium. "Ode to the Bouncer" was the anthem of benefit event Serious Request on the Dutch radio station 3FM in 2011, and a version of the song played on the station was released as a separate single, with the subtitle "This One's For Mama Version". Artists who have remixed the song include Bobby Rock and Pablo Rindt, Feng Shui, Niels van Gogh and Daniel Strauss, M-3ox, Lee Mortimer, Fear of Tigers, and Xilent.

== Critical reception ==
Critical reactions to "Ode to the Bouncer" have been approving, with some reviewers finding it humorous, while liking its production and arrangement. In a review of the group's self-titled debut album, a writer from MuuMuse described the song as "hysterically fierce" and "fresh". Contactmusic.com's Andrew Lockwood found the song "ridiculously catchy", while Scandipop.co.uk called its chorus stunning "both musically and melodically". Federico Antonioni of the Italian online publication concertionline.com labeled the song as an "excellent example of catchy dance music..."

The Irish Times's Jim Carroll called "Ode to the Bouncer" a "Smashing pop humdinger from mysterious combo with Danish, Finnish and UK members who prefer to hide (for now) behind cartoon characters," and a PopJustice writer said that it was a great track "that instantly sounds like something you've known forever." A staff member from the magazine FHM wrote that "The track’s great with lyrical gems like “you’re just another prick at the door” and the sound being some sort of mutant mash-up of Madonna and Gorillaz." Writing for the official site of The Jace Hall Show, Jeff Nau said that "At first, the song is cringingly annoying, but the 3rd time it’s in your head like a chunk of infected code."

== Track listing ==
Streaming & Digital Download

1. "Ode to the Bouncer" – 3:26
2. "Ode to the Bouncer (Bobby Rock and Pablo Rindt Remix)" – 6:24
3. "Ode to the Bouncer (Feng Shui Remix)" – 6:30
4. "Ode to the Bouncer (Niels Van Gogh and Daniel Strauss Remix)" – 6:22
5. "Ode to the Bouncer (M-3ox Remix)" – 6:26
6. "Ode to the Bouncer (Lee Mortimer Remix)" – 5:03
7. "Ode to the Bouncer (Fear of Tigers Remix)" – 4:52

== Remixes ==
Manhattan Clique Mixes

- "Ode to the Bouncer (Manhattan Clique Remix)" – 6:37
- "Ode to the Bouncer (Manhattan Clique Instrumental)" – 6:37
- "Ode to the Bouncer (Manhattan Clique Edit)" – 3:38

Niels Van Gogh & Daniel Strauss Mixes

- "Ode to the Bouncer (Niels Van Gogh & Daniel Strauss Remix)" – 6:22
- "Ode to the Bouncer (Niels Van Gogh & Daniel Strauss Edit)" – 3:51

Fear of Tigers Mix

- "Ode to the Bouncer (Fear of Tigers Remix)" – 4:52

Lee Mortimer Mix

- "Ode to the Bouncer (Lee Mortimer Remix)" – 5:03

Bobby Rock & Pablo Rindt Mix

- "Ode to the Bouncer (Bobby Rock & Pablo Rindt Remix)" – 6:24

M-3ox Mix

- "Ode to the Bouncer (M-3ox Remix)" – 6:26

Feng Shui Mix

- "Ode to the Bouncer (Feng Shui Remix)" – 6:30

Paradise 45 Mix

- "Ode to the Bouncer (Paradise 45 Remix)" – 7:10

Xilent Mix

- "Ode to the Bouncer (Xilent Remix)" – 4:14

== Accolades ==
Publication	Country	Accolade	Year	Rank
Spin	United States	20 Best Songs of the Summer	2011	*
"*" indicates the list is unordered.

== Charts ==
=== Weekly charts ===
Chart (2011–2012)	Peak position
Belgium (Ultratop 50 Flanders)	24
Belgium (Ultratop 50 Flanders Dance)	6
Belgium (Ultratop 50 Wallonia Dance Bubbling Under)	15
Denmark (Tracklisten)	15
Finland (Suomen virallinen lista)	13
Italian Airplay (EarOne)	52
Netherlands (Dutch Top 40)	1
Netherlands (Mega Dance Top 30)	1
Netherlands (Mega Top 50)	1
Netherlands (Single Top 100)	1
United Kingdom Commercial Pop Top 30 (Music Week)	26
United Kingdom Upfront Club Top 40 (Music Week)	9
US Dance/Electronic Digital Song Sales (Billboard)	9

=== Year-end charts ===
Chart (2011)	Position
Netherlands (Dutch Top 40)	112

Chart (2012)	Position
Belgium (Ultratop 50 Flanders Dance)	52
Netherlands (Dutch Top 40)	31
Netherlands (Mega Top 50)	46
Netherlands (MegaCharts Download)	34
Netherlands (Mega Single Top 100)	35

== Release history ==
Region	Date	Format	Label
Norway	6 April 2011	Digital download	Universal Music
Sweden	6 April 2011	Digital download	Universal Music
Denmark	2 May 2011	Digital download	Copenhagen Records
Armenia	9 May 2011	Digital download	Studio Killers Records
Australia	9 May 2011	Digital download	Studio Killers Records
Botswana	9 May 2011	Digital download	Studio Killers Records
Brazil	9 May 2011	Digital download	Studio Killers Records
Cameroun	9 May 2011	Digital download	Studio Killers Records
Canada	9 May 2011	Digital download	Studio Killers Records
Czech Republic	9 May 2011	Digital download	Studio Killers Records
Estonia	9 May 2011	Digital download	Studio Killers Records
Greece	9 May 2011	Digital download	Studio Killers Records
Hong Kong	9 May 2011	Digital download	Studio Killers Records
Hungary	9 May 2011	Digital download	Studio Killers Records
India	9 May 2011	Digital download	Studio Killers Records
Indonesia	9 May 2011	Digital download	Studio Killers Records
Israel	9 May 2011	Digital download	Studio Killers Records
Ivory Coast	9 May 2011	Digital download	Studio Killers Records
Japan	9 May 2011	Digital download	Studio Killers Records
Kenya	9 May 2011	Digital download	Studio Killers Records
Latvia	9 May 2011	Digital download	Studio Killers Records
Liechtenstein	9 May 2011	Digital download	Studio Killers Records
Lithuania	9 May 2011	Digital download	Studio Killers Records
Malaysia	9 May 2011	Digital download	Studio Killers Records
Malta	9 May 2011	Digital download	Studio Killers Records
Maurice	9 May 2011	Digital download	Studio Killers Records
Mexico	9 May 2011	Digital download	Studio Killers Records
New Zealand	9 May 2011	Digital download	Studio Killers Records
Niger	9 May 2011	Digital download	Studio Killers Records
Nigeria	9 May 2011	Digital download	Studio Killers Records
Philippines	9 May 2011	Digital download	Studio Killers Records
Portugal	9 May 2011	Digital download	Studio Killers Records
Romania	9 May 2011	Digital download	Studio Killers Records
Russia	9 May 2011	Digital download	Studio Killers Records
Singapore	9 May 2011	Digital download	Studio Killers Records
South Africa	9 May 2011	Digital download	Studio Killers Records
Slovenia	9 May 2011	Digital download	Studio Killers Records
Spain	9 May 2011	Digital download	Studio Killers Records
Taiwan	9 May 2011	Digital download	Studio Killers Records
Thailand	9 May 2011	Digital download	Studio Killers Records
Turkey	9 May 2011	Digital download	Studio Killers Records
Uganda	9 May 2011	Digital download	Studio Killers Records
United Kingdom	9 May 2011	Digital download	Studio Killers Records
United States	9 May 2011	Digital download	Studio Killers Records
Vietnam	9 May 2011	Digital download	Studio Killers Records
Finland	30 May 2011	Digital download	Warner Music
Netherlands	11 November 2011	Digital download	Spinnin Records
Netherlands	5 December 2011	Digital download — Remixes	Spinnin Records
Netherlands	10 December 2011	Digital download — Instrumental	Spinnin Records
Belgium	16 December 2011	Digital download — Remixes	Spinnin Records
Netherlands	25 December 2011	Digital download — This One's For Mama	Spinnin Records
Italy	23 March 2012	Digital download — Remixes	Time Records
Spain	1 May 2012	Digital download — Remixes	Blanco y Negro Music
Armenia	24 February 2013	Digital download — Remixes	Studio Killers Records
Australia	24 February 2013	Digital download — Remixes	Studio Killers Records
Brazil	24 February 2013	Digital download — Remixes	Studio Killers Records
Czech Republic	24 February 2013	Digital download — Remixes	Studio Killers Records
France	24 February 2013	Digital download — Remixes	Studio Killers Records
Japan	24 February 2013	Digital download — Remixes	Studio Killers Records
Latin America	24 February 2013	Digital download — Remixes	Studio Killers Records
Lithuania	24 February 2013	Digital download — Remixes	Studio Killers Records
New Zealand	24 February 2013	Digital download — Remixes	Studio Killers Records
Norway	24 February 2013	Digital download — Remixes	Studio Killers Records
Slovenia	24 February 2013	Digital download — Remixes	Studio Killers Records
Turkey	24 February 2013	Digital download — Remixes	Studio Killers Records
United Kingdom	24 February 2013	Digital download — Remixes	Studio Killers Records
United States	24 February 2013	Digital download — Remixes	Studio Killers Records

== See also ==
- List of Dutch Top 40 number-one singles of 2012
