= Gusttavo Lima e você =

2011 live album by Gusttavo Lima

- Cover of DVD release in Brazil

Live album by Gusttavo Lima
- Released: 20 September 2011
- Recorded: 3 June 2011
- Genre: Sertanejo, pop
- Label: Som Livre
- Producer: Áudio Mix

Gusttavo Lima chronology
Inventor dos amores (2010)	Gusttavo Lima e você (2011)	Ao vivo em São Paulo (2012)

Gusttavo Lima e você or E você is the third album of Brazilian sertanejo singer Gusttavo Lima and his second live album after Inventor dos amores. It was released in Brazil in 2011 and in Europe and North America in 2012. The songs were recorded during a live concert on 3 June 2011 and in front of an audience of 60,000 during the festival "Festa Nacional do Milho". at the Exhibition Park of the Brazilian city Patos de Minas, Lima's hometown in Minas Gerais state, Brazil. The live materials were also released in DVD form. The whole album has sold over 100,000 copies in Brazil.

The show lasted three hours during which Lima performed 29 songs, out of which 23 were included in the album. Besides his known songs, he sang 11 new songs never before released.

== Track listing ==
No.	Title	Length
1.	"Cor de ouro"	3:26
2.	"Balada"	3:21
3.	"Demais da conta"	2:32
4.	"Eu vou tentando te agarrar"	3:25
5.	"Arrasta"	2:43
6.	"Fora do comum"	2:49
7.	"Refém"	4:09
8.	"Tornado"	1:58
9.	"Calafrio"	1:57
10.	"Inventor dos amores"	3:17
11.	"60 Segundos"	3:11
12.	"Quem tem sorte é sortero"	2:54
13.	"Chora, Chora"	2:47
14.	"Se não quer me amar"	3:09
15.	"O amor não foi feito pra dividir"	2:50
16.	"As vezes sim, as vezes não"	2:46
17.	"Rosas, versos e vinho"	3:46
18.	"Eu te achei"	3:13
19.	"Eu Vou"	3:11
20.	"Coração / Revelação"	3:23
21.	"Caso consumado"	2:37
22.	"Furacão"	2:27
23.	"Viva intensamente"	3:20
Total length:		34:16

== Charts and certifications ==
=== Peak positions ===
Chart (2011–2012)	Peak position
Austrian Albums Chart	18
Belgium Albums Chart (Flanders)	25
Belgium Albums Chart (Wallonia)	36
Brazilian Albums Chart	7
Dutch Albums Chart	20
French Albums Chart	12
German Albums Chart	36
Polish Albums Chart	15
Portuguese Albums Chart	19
Portuguese DVD Chart	6
Swiss Albums Chart	6

=== Certifications ===
Region	Certification	Certified units/sales
Brazil (Pro-Música Brasil)	2× Platinum	80,000^{‡}
France (SNEP)	Gold	50,000^{*}
Poland (ZPAV)	Gold	10,000^{*}
^{*} Sales figures based on certification alone.^{‡} Sales+streaming figures based on certification alone.
