= Keizer (artist) =

- Known for: Public art, stenciling, street art, graffiti

Keizer is the pseudonym of an anonymous Egyptian street artist and graffiti artist whose work has gained popularity and notoriety in Egypt following the 2011 Egyptian Revolution. Keizer is reportedly a 33-year-old male who creates street art in Cairo full-time.

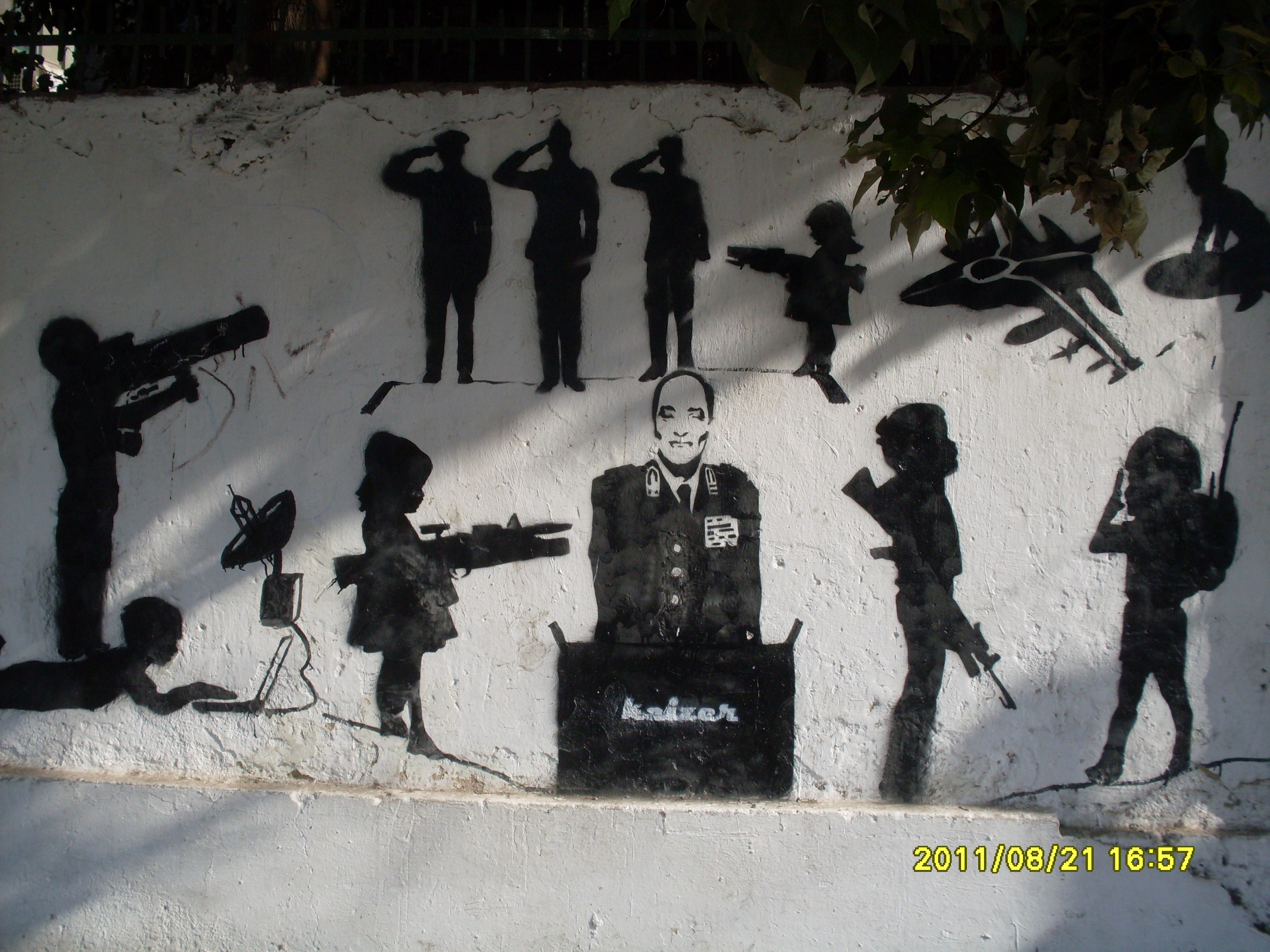
Stenciled artwork signed by Keizer

== Career and Politics ==
Little is known about Keizer's early life, as the artist (identified as a male) has taken steps to protect his identity. He has been photographed wearing a hooded sweatshirt while creating his artwork in order to impede identification.

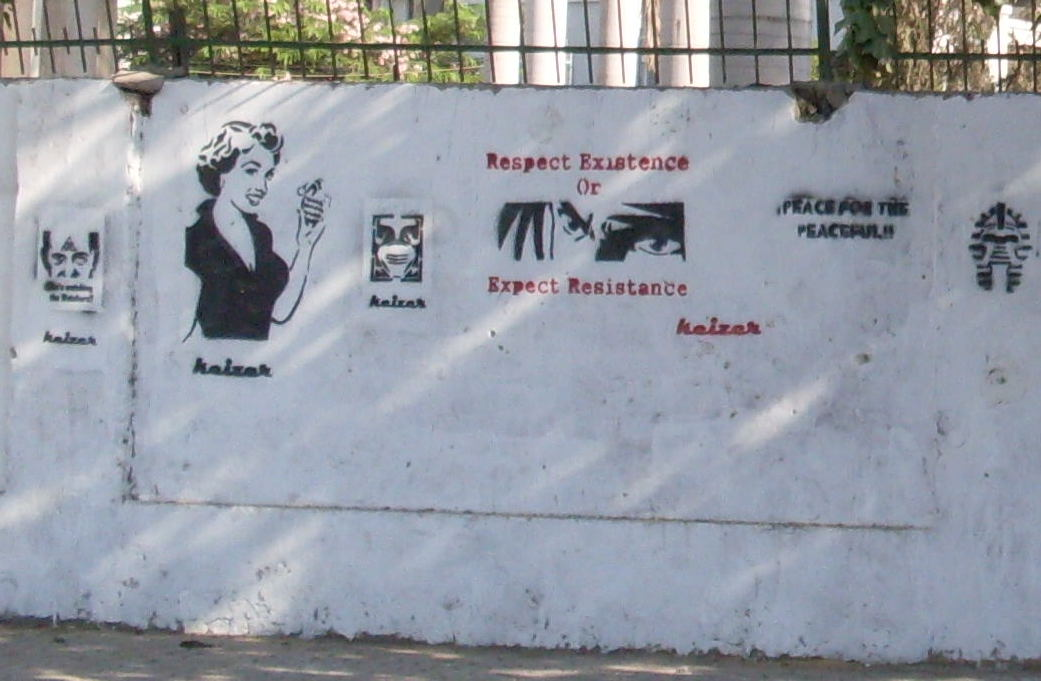
Artwork stenciled by Keizer in Cairo

Political street art was not common in Egypt prior to the 2011 revolution, however it has proliferated in public spaces in the post-revolution era. Artwork targeting the Supreme Council of the Armed Forces, or SCAF, in particular has surged in popularity since the revolution because, according to The Christian Science Monitor, such "anti-military graffiti is a reflection of Egyptian activists’ frustration with the military rulers, who they say replaced one autocracy with another." Keizer has noted that, although much of his work is political in nature, much of it is also ambiguous or apolitical. The artist has said that, "The whole point is that it’s up to you to think and make up your own conclusions ... And a lot of people here aren’t used to making their own conclusions — they’re used to being told what to think." Keizer has been described as an Arab nationalist, and much of his artwork targets capitalism and imperialism. Kaizer's hijacking of international corporations' logos represents a critique of consumerism though the visual and textual messages depicted, in addition to his choice of the easily duplicated stencil technique that can be interpreted as an additional subversion of the invasive advertising campaigns that these companies usually conduct.

=== Artwork ===
Keizer's artistic style has been noted as reminiscent of that of Banksy and Shepard Fairey. The text accompanying his images is both Arabic and English. When asked about the use of English in his artwork, Keizer has said that it is "Definitely to attack the upper echelons of society".

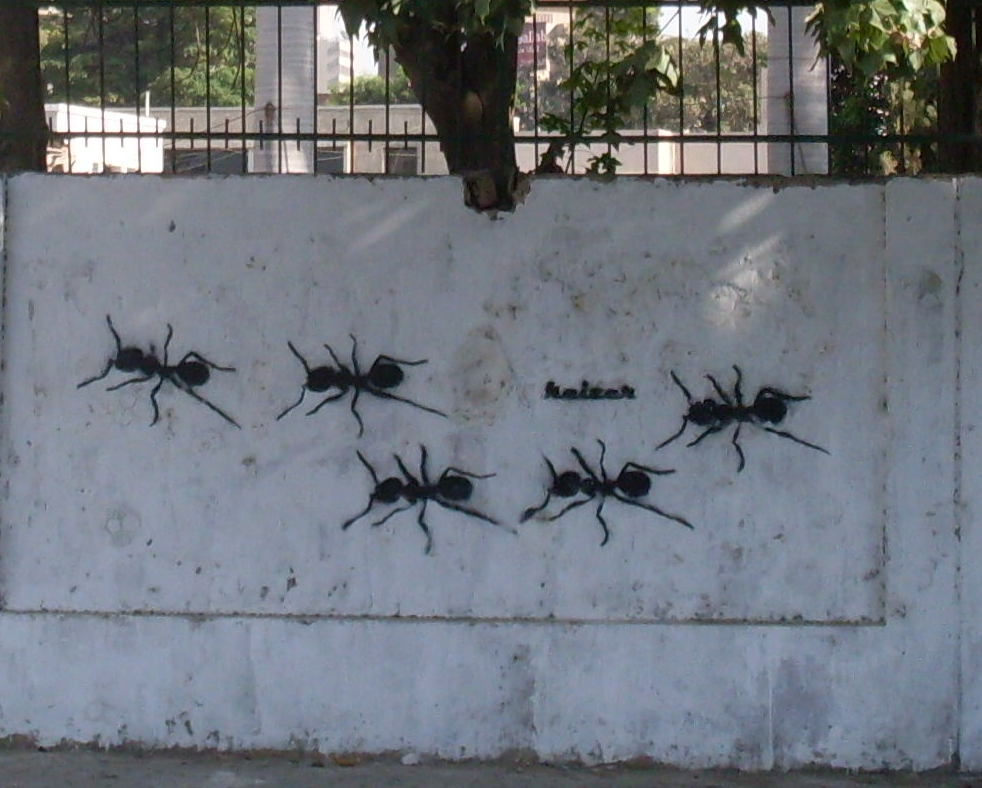
Ants stenciled by Keizer in Cairo

Among the images stenciled by Keizer in public spaces in Egypt are images of ants. The artist writes on his website that "The ant symbolizes the forgotten ones, the silenced, the nameless, those marginalized by capitalism. They are the working class, the common people, the colony that struggles and sacrifices blindly for the queen ant and her monarchy. Ants are devoted, dedicated workers, they cooperate, organize, delegate, and put themselves first in the line of danger and duty. Under appreciated and ruled, they receive and expect no reward for their efforts, toil and struggle..."

== See also ==
- El Teneen
- Ganzeer
- Chico (Egyptian artist)
- List of urban artists
