= Sandra van Nieuwland =

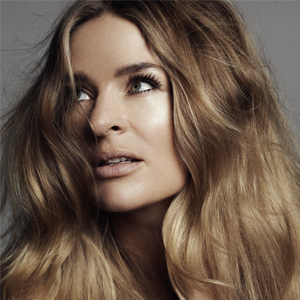

Background information
- Born: 16 February 1977 (age 49); Delft, Netherlands
- Occupation: Singer
- Years active: 2012–present
- Label: 8ballmusic
- Website: sandravannieuwland.com

Sandra van Nieuwland (born 16 February 1977 in Delft), also known as Sandra Newland, is a Dutch singer who gained national popularity after her participation in the third season of The Voice of Holland.

== Career ==
Van Nieuwland rose to fame when she participated in the third season of The Voice of Holland in 2012. During the competition, she received a Gold award for her cover of "More", which she sang during her audition. In the first live show, van Nieuwland received a platina award for "More" and became the first contestant to receive an award while the competition was still running. "More" also reached first place in the Singles Top 100, as well as her cover of "Keep Your Head Up". The following liveshow, she broke her own record with "Beggin'", which reached first place again. Her fourth number one hit came again a week later, with "New Age". So far, she has been the only contestant to have had four number one chart listings and to have received an award during the competition. She was also the first Dutch singer to have a first place and second place single in the Singles Top 100.

Van Nieuwland was eliminated in the semi-finals by Leona Philippo, who went on to win The Voice of Holland. During the finale, however, van Nieuwland received double platina for "More", platina for "Keep Your Head Up" and gold for both "Beggin'" and "New Age". That same day, her single "Venus" (which she also performed in The Voice of Holland) was released. It immediately reached first place again.

Van Nieuwland released her album And More in September 2012. It features new songs and some of her number one hits.

Her first single, "Hunter", was released on 10 August 2013. Together with her second one, "Always Alone", it would be on her second album, called Banging on the Doors of Love.

== Discography ==
- And More (2012)
- Banging on the Doors of Love (2013)
- Breaking New Ground (2015)
- Human Alien (2018)
