= Moving to Mars (film) =

Moving to Mars, directed by Mat Whitecross, is a 2009 documentary following the story of two Burmese families from a refugee camp near the Thai/Burmese border moving to their new homes in the United Kingdom.

The documentary was the inspiration for Coldplay's song of the same name.
