= Moving to Mars (song) =

Song by Coldplay

from the EP Every Teardrop Is a Waterfall
- Released: 26 June 2011
- Recorded: December 2008–August 2010
- Studio: The Bakery and The Beehive (London)
- Genre: Space rock; progressive rock; alternative rock
- Length: 4:18
- Label: Parlophone; Capitol
- Songwriters: Guy Berryman; Jonny Buckland; Will Champion; Chris Martin
- Producers: Markus Dravs; Daniel Green; Rik Simpson

"Moving to Mars" is a song by British rock band Coldplay. It was written by all members of the band for their fifth studio album Mylo Xyloto. However, it failed to make the final track listing. Instead, it was released in the Every Teardrop Is a Waterfall iTunes exclusive EP.

== Development ==
"Moving To Mars" has been described as a space rock and progressive rock song. The first half begins as a piano based ballad with Chris Martin singing in a lower register, before transitioning into a mid-tempo number.

The song was inspired by a documentary of the same name, which is based around two families being forced out of Burma into an entirely new world in the UK. The film was directed by the band's longtime collaborator Mat Whitecross, who also directed some of Coldplay's music videos, such as "Lovers in Japan", "Every Teardrop Is a Waterfall", "Paradise" and "Charlie Brown". During the recording sessions, one of the band's roadies under the pseudonym of "Roadie 42", blogged about Moving To Mars in February 2011, using the acronym 'MTM'. He said:

"Every room had some kind of writing or recording setup on the go - you even had to time your use of the kettle carefully, as a laptop and speakers had been set up in the kitchen and Jonny was in there working on his epic lead for MTM. So, by comparison, the first few weeks of the year felt like a ghost town."

In a cover story run by the American publication Billboard on Mylo Xyloto, the magazine described the track as a "'Major Tom'-meets-Sinatra exercise". With regards to the song, guitarist Jonny Buckland stated:

"It probably won't make it (the record). It was just one of those ones. There was a period where it all worked, then it sat for a bit, we threw (out) lots of ideas, brought them together, pulled them apart, put them back on. We always like the beginning... that intimate sound. And we thought, 'Where can we take it? What can we do?'"

The Kooks' frontman Luke Pritchard said that the track is one of Coldplay's best songs and that it's "bound to be a bootleg classic". He also spoke about a conversation he had had with the band's lead singer Chris Martin about the song and said the frontman looked genuinely disappointed that the track was left off the record.

== Release and reception ==
The song was uploaded onto YouTube for streaming purposes on 24 June 2011 and released on iTunes two days later. It was well received by the fans and the press, with Billboard writing about the song:

"Moving to Mars" is a sparse, vocal-led ballad that gathers steam behind a gentle piano line halfway through."

While the site Pretty Much Amazing said:

"The third song the band chose to share from the EP, 'Moving To Mars' sounds like classic Coldplay, though with some well-timed shifts that sort of brings Bends-era Radiohead to mind. Too bad it lacks the timeless melodies that make cuts like 'The Scientist' and 'Yellow' stand out."

== Charts ==
Weekly chart performance
Chart (2011)	Peak position
Australia (ARIA)	71
Belgium (Ultratop 50 Wallonia)	49
Canada Hot 100 (Billboard)	64
Finland (The Official Finnish Downloads Chart)	30
France (SNEP)	70
Spain (Promusicae)	25
UK Singles (Official Charts)	163
US Billboard Hot 100	90
