= Studio Killers =

European virtual electropop band

- Members from left to right: Goldie Foxx, Cherry, Dyna Mink

Background information
- Origin: United Kingdom; Finland; Denmark
- Genres: Electronic; dance-pop
- Years active: 2011–present
- Labels: Studio Killers; Copenhagen; Universal; Warner Music; Spinnin'; Time; EMI
- Members: Cherry; Goldie Foxx; Dyna Mink
- Website: studiokillers.com

Studio Killers is a British-Finnish-Danish virtual band made up of four animated characters: vocalist and designer Cherry, keyboardist Goldie Foxx, DJ Dyna Mink, and manager Bipolar Bear.

The only confirmed members of the band are Darren Stokes and Philip Larsen.

== History ==
=== 2011–2014: Formation and debut studio album ===
The voices of Goldie Foxx and Dyna Mink stated that they had originally written a song for a British girl band that was dropped from their label and were put in contact with Cherry's vocalist, who wrote the lyrics and performed the song with them. The members claim that most of their correspondence is through email, although their song "Who Is in Your Heart Now?" was written when they first had a face to face meeting. The identities of the band members are unknown, and all interaction with fans is conducted via their fictional counterparts; however, it has been speculated by fans that the Finnish musician Teemu Brunila provides the voice of Cherry.

They premiered in 2011 with the single "Ode to the Bouncer", about the lead singer character Cherry's difficulties in getting into a club, and gained popularity through their music video on YouTube. The single was successful in the Netherlands, Finland, and Denmark. After releasing other singles "Eros and Apollo", "All Men Are Pigs", and "Jenny" through 2012 and 2013, they released their self-titled debut album in 2013, and followed up in 2014 with the new single "Grande Finale". Studio Killers also announced that they were going to start having live shows, starting with the 2014 Ruisrock festival in Finland, followed by Ilosaarirock. To prepare for this performance and a world tour, they began a crowdfunding campaign on Kickstarter for £50,000 and successfully gathered £55,176.

In 2014 the band performed live at Ruisrock and Ilosaarirock festivals. The real-life counterparts of the characters Goldie Foxx and Dyna Mink appeared on stage wearing masks, and the character Cherry was present in the form of screen projection.

=== 2015–2019: Hiatus and comeback ===
In 2015, after a year-long absence, Studio Killers made a brief comeback and released the music video for "Jenny" on 24 December, as a Christmas gift to their fans. The band went on a two year long hiatus, up until 15 February 2018, a YouTube video titled "Fresh Start: Studio Killers Are Back!" was posted onto their official YouTube channel, in which an animated Cherry promises new music coming soon.

Later on in 2018, they released two singles; "Party Like It's Your Birthday" on 8 June and "Dirty Car" on 30 November, with music videos accompanying each song respectively.

On 31 August 2019 the group announced their intent to create an animated series and plan to launch a kickstarter to create a pitch pilot called Studio Killers 404. The kickstarter reached its $115,000 goal in three days.

=== 2020–2023: "Jenny" TikTok success and remixes ===
During 2020, the 2013 single "Jenny" started gaining success over the platform TikTok and started a new trend on the video-sharing app. The group decided to release a lyric video to the song on 13 January 2021. The track later received a remix by Danish DJ and producer Faustix, on 10 February 2021.

The group recorded a new version of the single "Jenny" with the help of German singer Kim Petras; this new version was released on 26 March 2021.

In June 2021, the group collaborated with electronic music duo The Knocks and released the single "Bedroom Eyes". They later featured in a remix of the song by Nathan Barnatt under the persona of Dad Feels.

In December 2021, an animated pilot Studio Killers 404 was released on YouTube.

On March 24, 2023, they released a new single, "Underneath my Raincoat", later re-titled simply "Raincoat".

== Discography ==
=== Studio albums ===
List of studio albums, with selected chart positions
Title	Details	Peak chart positions		
Title	Details	FIN	US Indie	US Heat
Studio Killers	Released 14 June 2013; Label: Studio Killers; Formats: CD, digital download	10	39	9

=== Singles ===
List of singles, with selected chart positions
Year	Title	Peak chart positions										Certification	Album
Year	Title	DEN	FIN	UK	UK Club	BEL (Fl)	BEL (Wa) Dance	NLD 40	NLD 100	US Sales	US Dance Digital	Certification	Album
2011	"Ode to the Bouncer"	15	13	26	9	24	65	1	1	—	9		Studio Killers
2012	"Eros and Apollo"	—	—	—	—	—	—	Tip: 4	—	—	—		Studio Killers
2013	"All Men Are Pigs"	—	—	—	—	—	—	—	—	—	—		Studio Killers
2013	"Jenny"	—	2	—	—	—	—	—	—	—	3	RIAA: Gold	Studio Killers
2013	"Who Is in Your Heart Now?"	—	—	—	—	—	—	—	—	—	—		Studio Killers
2014	"Grande Finale"	—	—	—	—	—	—	—	—	6	—		Studio Killers (Special Edition)
2018	"Party Like it's Your Birthday"	—	—	—	—	—	—	—	—	—	17		Non-album single
2018	"Dirty Car"	—	—	—	—	—	—	—	—	—	—		Studio Killers (Special Edition)
2020	"Jenny (I Wanna Ruin Our Friendship)" (2020 reissue)	—	—	—	—	—	—	—	—	—	—		Studio Killers
2021	"Party Like It's Your Birthday" (featuring Omi)	—	—	—	—	—	—	—	—	—	—		Non-album singles
2021	"Jenny" (featuring Kim Petras)	—	—	—	—	—	—	—	—	—	—		Non-album singles
2021	"Bedroom Eyes" (The Knocks featuring Studio Killers)	—	—	—	—	—	—	—	—	—	—		Non-album singles
2021	"Schoolyard Dance Off"	—	—	—	—	—	—	—	—	—	—		Non-album singles
2021	"Soft Bitch" (Studio Killers and Ally Ahern)	—	—	—	—	—	—	—	—	—	—		Non-album singles
2023	"Underneath My Raincoat"	—	—	—	—	—	—	—	—	—	—		Non-album singles
2024	"Valentine"	—	—	—	—	—	—	—	—	—	—		Non-album singles
"—" denotes releases that did not chart or were not released in that country.													Non-album singles
