= Gusttavo Lima =

Brazilian singer (born 1989)

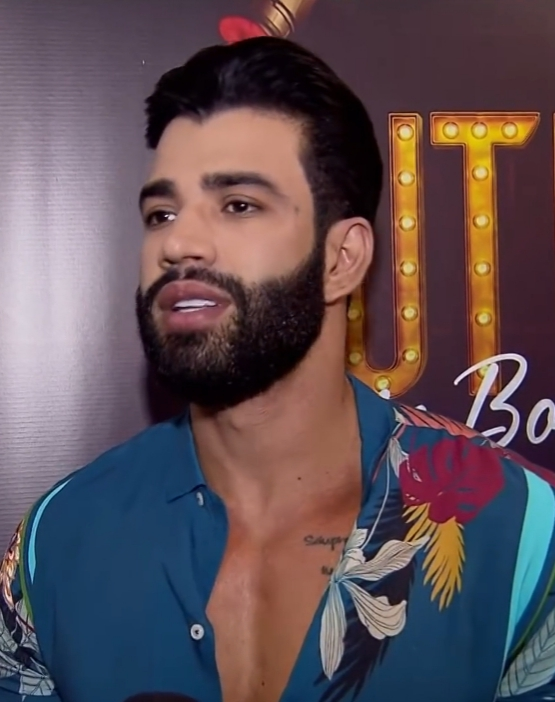
- Lima in 2021

Background information
- Born: Nivaldo Batista Lima; September 3, 1989 (age 37); Presidente Olegário, Minas Gerais, Brazil
- Origin: Patos de Minas, Minas Gerais, Brazil
- Genres: Bachata; sertanejo; arrocha
- Occupation: Singer
- Instrument: Vocals
- Years active: 1999–present
- Labels: Som Livre (2010–18); Sony Music (2019–present)
- Website: www.gusttavolima.com.br

Nivaldo Batista Lima (born September 3, 1989), known by his stage name Gusttavo Lima (Brazilian Portuguese: [ɡusˈtavu ˈlimɐ]), is a Brazilian singer, songwriter and record producer. He is known in Brazil for his many hit songs, and gained international prominence through his 2011 song "Balada".

Lima started his career at the age of 7, with his elder brothers Willian and Marcelo, as a member of the Trio Remelexo. After leaving the trio, he went to the Sertanejo music duo Gustavo & Alessandro. In 2009, Lima released his debut solo studio album, which produced the successful song "Rosas, Versos e Vinhos", that topped regional radio charts and later entered in the Brasil Hot 100 Airplay. In 2010, the singer released his first live album, Inventor dos Amores, which produced three successful singles, "Inventor dos Amores", "Cor de Ouro" and "Refém". In 2011, the single "Balada", propelled Lima to national stardom. The song peaked at number 3 on Billboard Brazil Hot 100 Airplay, and also reached success in several countries such as the Netherlands, Belgium, Spain, United States, France, Sweden, among others. "Balada" was include in his second live album Gusttavo Lima e Você (2011), which was certified platinum in Brazil. In 2012, the singer made his first international tour in the United States and in Europe. His third live album Ao Vivo in São Paulo (2012), which produced the single hit "Gatinha Assanhada", sold more than 200,000 copies and was certified double platinum.

In 2014, his second studio album Do Outro Lado da Moeda, had moderate commercial performance being certified gold in Brazil, however, the album produced the hit singles "Diz Pra Mim", "Fui Fiel", "Tô Solto na Night" and "10 Anos". In 2015, he released his fourth live album Buteco do Gusttavo Lima, which featured several popular Brazilian artists performing popular songs of sertanejo music, as well as some songs from his own repertoire. His fifth live album 50/50 (2016), was one of his most successful albums, spawning the hit songs "Que Pena Que Acabou", "Homem de Família" and "Abre o Portão Que Eu Cheguei", with all topping the Brazil Hot 100 Airplay. In 2017, Lima released his sixth live album Buteco do Gusttavo Lima Vol. 2, featuring re-recordings and unpublished songs. Its lead single "Apelido Carinhoso" was a smash hit, topping the Brasil Hot 100 Airplay. In 2018, he released his seventh live album O Embaixador recorded at the Festa do Peão de Barretos, which alike his previous album featured unpublished songs and re-recordings, and its lead single "Zé da Recaída" was a smash hit, also topping the Brasil Hot 100 Airplay, his sixth song to top the chart.

== Early life ==
Lima was born in Presidente Olegário, Minas Gerais state, the son of Sebastiana and Alcino Lima. In 1998, when he was just 9 years old, he went to Patos de Minas to sing with his brothers, who had a band called 'Trio Remelexo'. When he was 13 years old, he left the band and went to Brasília, where he changed his stage name to "Gusttavo" and assembled a duo called Gustavo & Alessandro.

== Career ==
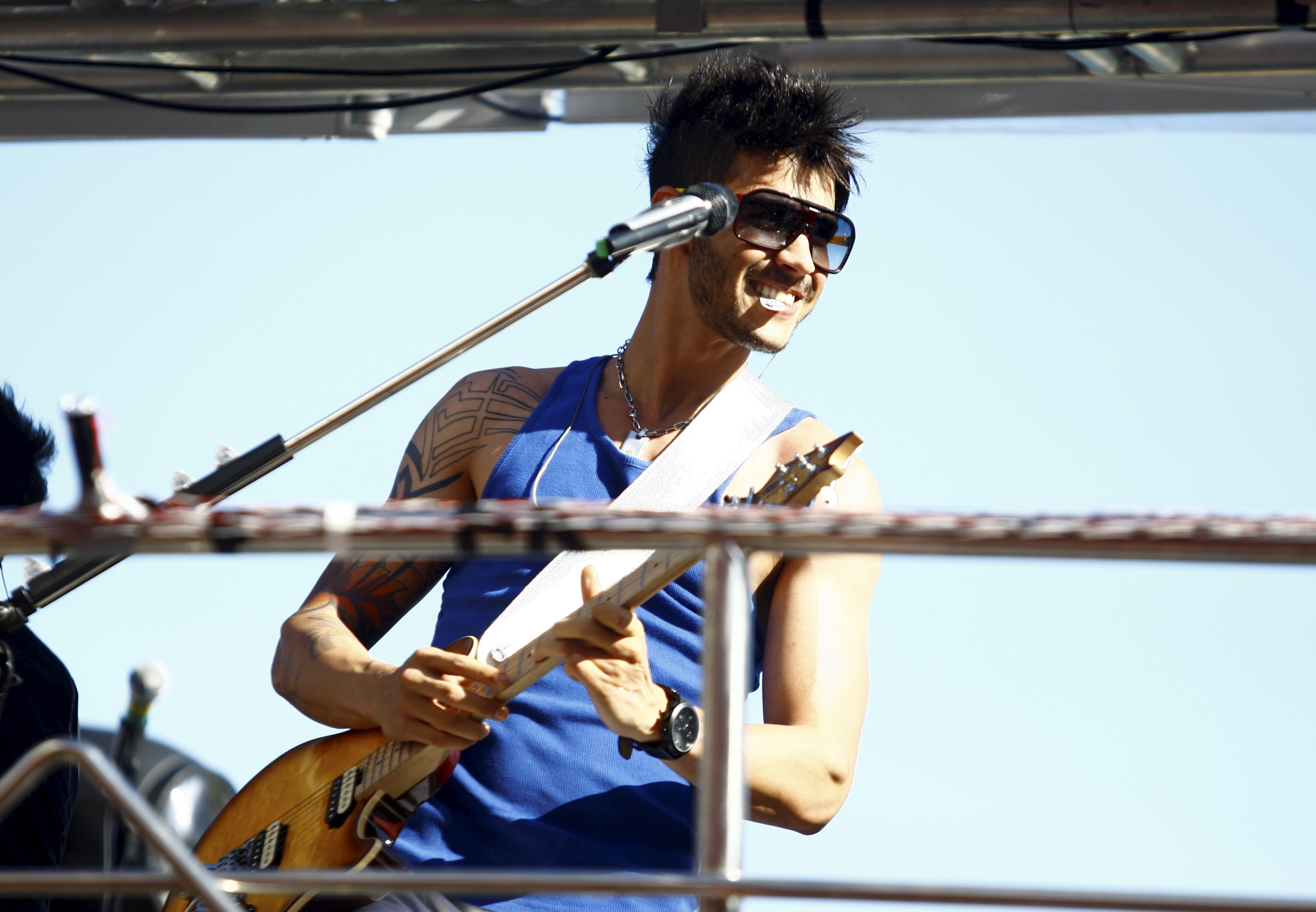
Gusttavo Lima live at the Circuito Dodô, in Bahia, Brazil (2012)

=== Musical career ===
In 2009, he released his first album Gusttavo Lima, containing 24 tracks.The most commercially successful track was "Rosas, Versos e Vinhos", which reached the first position in a local radio, and it also reached No. 57 in Billboard Brasil charts. In 2010, he signed with Som Livre label and released Inventor dos Amores, as a CD and DVD, with sales of 15,000 copies. The title track was a collaboration with Jorge & Mateus, reaching No. 17 in the Brazilian Billboard Brasil charts. Following this release, he released the single "Cor de Ouro" that reached No. 18 in Brazil. He also released "Refém", which reached No. 22 in charts.

In 2011, Gusttavo released CD and DVD titled Gusttavo Lima e Você which was recorded live in Patos de Minas, on June 3, 2011, during Fenamilho musical event with estimated audience of 6,000,000 people. The album reached No. 7 and was certified platinum. The album produced his definitive hit "Balada" (full title "Balada Boa (Tchê Tcherere Tchê Tchê) based on the famous refrain), which reached No. 3 in Brazil. The Brazilian football player Neymar played a similar role to that he played in Michel Teló's smash success "Ai se eu te pego!" and appeared in many shows with Gusttavo Lima.

In January 2012, he embarked on a first international tour with shows in US Latin markets in Florida, and later on in Atlanta (Georgia), Newark (New Jersey) and Revere (Massachusetts). Gusttavo released his hit single "Balada" in European markets following the steps of fellow Brazilian singer Michel Teló. He also released another live album in 2012 titled Ao vivo em São Paulo, on October 6, 2012 in Brazil

== Controversy ==
On 23 September 2024, a judge in Pernambuco ordered Lima's arrest on charges of money laundering and illegal gambling involving the sale of three aircraft by Lima's company, Balada Eventos. Lima described the allegations as "craziness". The following day, the arrest order was suspended after Lima was granted habeas corpus by another judge in Pernambuco.

== Discography ==
=== Albums ===
Studio albums

Studio albums
Year	Album	Peak chart positions	Certifications
Year	Album	BRA	Certifications
2009	Gusttavo Lima		
2014	Do Outro Lado da Moeda	1	Platinum
2017	Buteco do Gusttavo Lima Vol. 2		2× Platinum

Live albums

Year	Album	Peak chart positions	Certifications	Certifications (Video album)
Year	Album	BRA	Certifications	Certifications (Video album)
2010	Inventor dos Amores	12	Platinum	
2011	Gusttavo Lima e você	7	2× Platinum	Platinum
2012	Ao Vivo em São Paulo	2	2× Platinum	2× Platinum
2015	Buteco do Gusttavo Lima	5	Platinum	Platinum
2016	Gusttavo Lima 50/50	7	2X Platin	
2018	O Embaixador		Diamond	
2019	O Embaixador in Cariri		2X Platin	
2020	O Embaixador The Legacy			

=== EPs ===
Year	Album	Peak chart positions
Year	Album	BRA
2012	Gusttavo Lima EP	–

=== Singles ===
Year	Title	Peak chart positions	Certification	Album
Year	Title	BRA	Certification	Album
2009	"Caso Consumado"	—		Gusttavo Lima
2010	"Rosas, Versos e Vinhos"	57		Gusttavo Lima
2010	"Inventor dos Amores" (feat. Jorge & Mateus)	13		Inventor dos Amores
2011	"Cor de Ouro"	18		Inventor dos Amores
2011	"Refém"	22		Inventor dos Amores
2011	"Balada"	3		Gusttavo Lima e você
2011	Fora do Comum"	31		Gusttavo Lima e você
2012	"60 Segundos"	14		Gusttavo Lima e você
2012	"Gatinha Assanhada"	7		Ao Vivo em São Paulo
2012	"Fazer Beber"	79		Ao Vivo em São Paulo
2013	"Doidaça"	19		Ao Vivo em São Paulo
2013	"Diz Pra Mim" (Portuguese version of Just Give Me a Reason)	10		Do Outro Lado da Moeda
2013	"Fui Fiel"	7	Gold	Do Outro Lado da Moeda
2014	"Tô Solto na Night"	3		Do Outro Lado da Moeda
2014	"10 Anos"	24	Platinum	Do Outro Lado da Moeda
2014	"Que Mal Te Fiz Eu? (Diz-Me)"	4		Non-album release
2014	"Se É pra Beber Eu Bebo"	23		Gusttavo Lima 50/50
2015	"Você não Me Conhece"	6		Non-album release
2015	"Tá Faltando Eu" (feat. Jorge & Mateus)	35	Gold	Buteco do Gusttavo Lima
2015	"Não Paro de Beber"	18		Gusttavo Lima 50/50
2016	"Que Pena Que Acabou"	1	Gold	Gusttavo Lima 50/50
2016	"Homem de Família"	1		Gusttavo Lima 50/50
2016	"O Velhinho" (feat. Paula Fernandes)	68		Gusttavo Lima 50/50
2017	"Abre o Portão Que Eu Cheguei"	1	Platinum	
2017	"Eu Vou Te Buscar (Cha La La La La)" (feat. Hungria Hip-Hop)	1	Platinum	O Embaixador
2017	"Apelido Carinhoso"	1	Diamond	Buteco do Gusttavo Lima Vol. 2
2018	"Mundo de Ilusões"	75	Gold	Buteco do Gusttavo Lima Vol. 2
2018	"Zé da Recaída"	1	Diamond	O Embaixador
2019	"Cem Mil"	1	Diamond	O Embaixador
2019	"Milu"	1		O Embaixador in Cariri
2020	"A Gente Fez Amor"	1		O Embaixador in Cariri
2020	"Saudade Sua"	17		Non-album release
2020	"Café e Amor"			

=== Songs featured in ===
Year	Title	Peak chart positions	Album
Year	Title	BRA	Album
2011	"Chega Mais Pra Cá" (Humberto & Ronaldo feat. Gusttavo Lima)	81	Romance - Ao Vivo
2012	"Vem Ni Mim Dodge Ram" (Israel Novaes feat. Gusttavo Lima)	2	O Cara do Arrocha
2013	"Festa Boa" (Henrique & Diego feat. Gusttavo Lima)	3	Henrique & Diego Ao Vivo em Campo Grande
2013	"Not This Time" (Laura S. feat. Gusttavo Lima)	—	Non-album release
2014	"3 Horas da Manhã" (Laís feat. Gusttavo Lima)	—	Non-album release
2014	"Cordão de Ouro" (Romim Mata feat. Gusttavo Lima)	—	Non-album release
2014	"Implorando Pra Trair" (Michel Teló feat. Gusttavo Lima)	3	Bem Sertanejo
2015	"Cicatrizes" (Kleo Dibah & Rafael feat. Gusttavo Lima)	38	Só Uma História
2015	"Homem Chora Sim" (Edy Britto & Samuel feat. Gusttavo Lima)	18	Os Ciganos - Ao Vivo em Goiânia
2015	"Amo Até no Céu" (Gabriel Gava feat. Gusttavo Lima, Lucas Lucco e Israel Novaes)	12	Single em Homenagem a Cristiano Araújo e Allana Moraes
2015	"Dim Dim" (Thiago Brava feat. Gusttavo Lima)	53	Non-album release
2016	"Fica Louca" (Thaeme & Thiago feat. Gusttavo Lima)	18	Ethernize - Ao Vivo
2016	"E Aí" (Matogrosso & Mathias feat. Gusttavo Lima)	23	40 Anos - Ao Vivo em Brasília
2016	"Eu Menti" (Rick Sollo feat. Gusttavo Lima)	—	Foi Deus
2017	"Hormônios" (Racyne & Rafael feat. Gusttavo Lima)	47	Em Um Lugar Assim
2017	"Faixa 3" (Bruninho & Davi feat. Gusttavo Lima)	2	Ao Vivo no Ibirapuera
2017	"Não Fui Capaz de Te Esquecer" (Zé Henrique & Gabriel feat. Gusttavo Lima)	69	Histórico
2017	"Será Que Cê Deixa" (Rick & Rangel feat. Gusttavo Lima)	32	Infinity
2017	"Noites Frustradas" (Jads & Jadson feat. Gusttavo Lima)	6	Balada Bruta
2018	"Meu Coração Não Chora, Urra" (Day & Lara feat. Gusttavo Lima)	26	Non-album release
2018	"Golpe Baixo" (Rob Nunes feat. Gusttavo Lima)	25	Ao Vivo em Goiânia
2019	"Dá Preferência Pra Mim" (Thiago Brava feat. Gusttavo Lima)	6	Non-album release
2019	"Salvou Meu Dia" (Kevinho feat. Gusttavo Lima)	73	Non-album release
2019	"Tiro Certo" (Zé Felipe feat. Gusttavo Lima)	10	Ao Vivo
2019	"Algo Mais (Amante)" (Xand Avião feat. Gusttavo Lima)	48	Errejota Ao Vivo
2019	"Drive-Thru" (Márcia Fellipe feat. Gusttavo Lima)	19	Made in Studio
2019	"Maria Passa na Frente" (Padre Marcelo Rossi feat. Gusttavo Lima)	—	Non-album release
2019	"Lo Que Tú y Yo Vivimos" (Gente De Zona feat. Gusttavo Lima)	14	OTRA COSA

=== Other appearances ===
Year	Title	Album	Artist
2011	"Utopia"	Milhões de Vozes - Ao Vivo em Fortaleza	Padre Reginaldo Manzotti
2011	"É Fato"	Efeitos Tour 2011	Cristiano Araújo
2012	"E Aí"	Ao Vivo Em Londrina	Thaeme & Thiago
2012	"Sou Seu Fã"	Marca Evidente	Israel & Rodolffo
2012	"Paraquedas"	Paraquedas	Matheus & Kauan
2012	"Safadiar"	Sorriso 15 Anos - Ao Vivo	Sorriso Maroto
2012	"Eu Vou Contar Pro Cêis"	Eu Vou Contar Pro Cêis	Humberto & Ronaldo & Jorge & Mateus
2013	"Vou Me Entregar"	Henrique & Diego Ao Vivo em Campo Grande	Henrique & Diego
2014	"Temporal de Amor / Solidão"	Leonardo - 30 Anos	Leonardo
2014	"Previsões"	Entre Amigos	Milton Nunes
2014	"Como Apaixonado Faz"	Israel Novaes Ao Vivo Em Goiânia	Israel Novaes
2014	"Três Corações"	Pra Ser Tudo Perfeito	Fred & Gustavo
2014	"Saudade da Minha Terra"	Bem Sertanejo	Michel Teló
2014	"Para Não Ser Triste"	Natal em Família 2	João Neto & Frederico
2015	"Pra Ficar Tudo Certo"	Onde Tudo Começou	Zé Ricardo & Thiago
2015	"Tem Que Ter Paixão"	Escândalo de Amor	Edson & Hudson
2015	"Disputa"	Adivinha	Lucas Lucco
2016	"Homem é Homem"	A Danada Sou Eu	Ludmilla
2017	O Velhinho (Gusttavo Lima with Paula Fernandes)	Presente de Natal - O Especial de Natal da Globo	Various Artists
2020	"Que Pasen los Dias"	Mesa Para Dos	Kany García

=== Other charting songs ===
Year	Title	Peak chart positions	Certification	Album
Year	Title	BRA	Certification	Album
2016	"Jejum de Amor"	18	Gold	Buteco do Gusttavo Lima
2018	"Carrinho de Areia"	21	Platinum	O Embaixador
2019	"Respeita o Nosso Fim"	25	Diamond	O Embaixador
2019	"Carreira Solo"	94		O Embaixador in Cariri
2020	"Que Pasen los Dias" (Kany Garcia feat. Gusttavo Lima)	71		Mesa Para Dos

=== Promotional songs ===
Year	Title	Peak chart positions	Certification	Album
Year	Title	BRA	Certification	Album
2011	"Minha Mulher Não Deixa Não" (feat. Reginho)	94		Non-album release
2012	"Sete Mares"	—		Non-album release
2012	"Mente Pra Mim"	—		Non-album release
2013	"As Mina Pira na Balada"	—		Gusttavo Lima Ao Vivo em São Paulo
2013	"Só Tem Eu"	77		Do Outro Lado da Moeda
2014	"Do Outro Lado da Moeda" (part. Zezé Di Camargo & Luciano)	—		Do Outro Lado da Moeda
2014	"O Melhor de Mim"; Portuguese version of "All of Me")	—		Non-album release
2016	"Quem Vem de Longe"	—		Trilha sonora da novela Êta Mundo Bom
2016	"50/50"	—	Gold	Gusttavo Lima 50/50
2019	"Online"	—		O Embaixador in Cariri
2019	"Quem Traiu Levou"	—		O Embaixador in Cariri

== Discography: International charts ==
Albums

Year	Album	Peak chart positions									Notes
Year	Album	BRA	AUT	BEL (Fl)	BEL (Wa)	FRA	GER	NED	POR	SWI	Notes
2012	Gusttavo Lima e você	7	18	25	36	12	36	20	19	6	In certain releases, album listed as E você

Singles

List of singles, with selected chart positions
Year	Single	Peak chart positions												Album	Certification
Year	Single	BRA	AUT	BEL (Fl)	BEL (Wa)	FIN	FRA	GER	ITA	NED	SPA	SWE	SWI	Album	Certification
2012	"Balada"	3	2	1	2	19	1	3	1	1	9	33	1	Gusttavo Lima e você	BEL: Platinum; ITA: 2× Platinum; ESP: Gold; SWI: Platinum

== Filmography ==
- 2013: Amor à Vida (aka Rastros de Mentiras) as Gusttavo Lima (himself)
