= Go – The Very Best of Moby =

2006 compilation album by Moby

Greatest hits album by Moby
- Released: October 24, 2006
- Recorded: 1992–2006
- Genre: Techno; electronica
- Length: 2:18:37 (U.S. version); 109:28 (DVD)
- Label: V2 / Mute

Moby chronology
Hotel (2005)	Go – The Very Best of Moby (2006)	The BioShock EP (2007)

Singles from Go – The Very Best of Moby
- 1. "New York, New York" Released: October 23, 2006

Go – The Very Best of Moby is a compilation album by American electronic musician Moby, released in 2006. Various versions of the album were released around the world with different track listings, including single-disc versions containing hit singles, and two-disc versions which include singles plus a second disc of (mainly) remixes. The previously unreleased "New York, New York" featuring vocals by Debbie Harry, is also included in the release.

Professional ratings
Review scores
Source	Rating
AllMusic	3/5 stars
Classic Rock	7/10 stars
Entertainment Weekly	B−
Pitchfork Media	6.9/10
Q	4/5 stars
Rolling Stone	4/5 stars

== Remixed ==
Go – The Very Best of Moby: Remixed

Remix album by Moby
- Released: March 5, 2007
- Genre: House; progressive electronic
- Length: 74:43 (18-track); 78:24 (19-track); 69:39 (download)
- Label: Mute
- Producer: Moby

Moby chronology
Go – The Very Best of Moby (2006)	Go – The Very Best of Moby: Remixed (2007)	The BioShock EP (2007)

A remix album, Go – The Very Best of Moby: Remixed was released in March 2007. All of the tracks are remixes of Moby's work by other producers and remixers, apart from track 17, which is a remix Moby himself produced.

The tracks are not mixed into each other, but most of them are edits of the original remixes. Editing is credited to RJ, James Aparicio, David Loudoun, and Saxo. The digital download version omits tracks 16 and 17.

== Track listing ==
Five different versions of Go – The Very Best of Moby were released in different regions of the world. Each version contains different songs, based on the singles and their popularity in that region. All songs are edited versions of the album mixes, unless noted.

Single-disc editions

A single-disc version of the album was released in the United Kingdom, France, and South America. The Danish single-disc version is similar to the South American one except it does not include "Bodyrock" and "Beautiful". The two-disc international deluxe edition was also available for sale in these regions for an additional price.

United Kingdom
1. "Go"
2. "Why Does My Heart Feel So Bad?"
3. "In This World"
4. "Porcelain"
5. "In My Heart"
6. "New York, New York"
  - featuring Debbie Harry
7. "Natural Blues"
8. "Lift Me Up"
9. "Bodyrock"
10. "We Are All Made of Stars"
11. "Slipping Away"
12. "Honey"
13. "Move"
14. "James Bond Theme"
15. "Feeling So Real"
France
1. "Natural Blues"
2. "Slipping Away (Crier la Vie)" (Radio Mix)
  - featuring Mylène Farmer
3. "Porcelain"
4. "In This World"
5. "Why Does My Heart Feel So Bad?"
6. "We Are All Made of Stars"
7. "Find My Baby"
8. "In My Heart"
9. "Lift Me Up"
10. "Honey"
  - featuring Kelis
11. "New York, New York"
  - featuring Debbie Harry
12. "Beautiful"
13. "Run On"
14. "Go"
15. "James Bond Theme"
South America
1. "Natural Blues"
2. "Lift Me Up" (Jeremy Wheatley Mix)
3. "Porcelain"
4. "In This World"
5. "Why Does My Heart Feel So Bad?"
6. "James Bond Theme" (Moby's re-version)
7. "Go"
8. "Bodyrock"
9. "New York, New York"
  - featuring Debbie Harry
10. "Find My Baby"
11. "In My Heart"
12. "Feeling So Real"
13. "We Are All Made of Stars"
14. "Beautiful"
15. "Move (You Make Me Feel So Good)"
16. "Honey"
17. "Slipping Away"

Two-disc deluxe editions

Two different versions of two-disc deluxe editions were made — one for the United States, and also an international version to be sold in all other countries. In the United Kingdom, France, and South America, the deluxe international version was sold in addition to the single-disc versions listed above.

United States (Disc 1)
1. "Natural Blues"
2. "Go" (2006 Mix)
3. "Porcelain"
4. "We Are All Made of Stars"
5. "Dream About Me"
6. "New York, New York"
  - featuring Debbie Harry
7. "In This World"
8. "South Side" (Original Album Version)
9. "Beautiful"
10. "Extreme Ways"
11. "Why Does My Heart Feel So Bad?"
12. "In My Heart" (New Mix)
13. "Honey"
14. "Lift Me Up" (Album Mix)
15. "Feeling So Real" (Live in London)
16. "God Moving over the Face of the Waters" (Heat mix)
International (Disc 1)
1. "Natural Blues"
2. "Lift Me Up" (Jeremy Wheatley Mix)
3. "Porcelain"
4. "In This World"
5. "Why Does My Heart Feel So Bad?"
6. "James Bond Theme" (Moby's re-version)
7. "Go"
8. "New York, New York"
  - featuring Debbie Harry
9. "Find My Baby"
10. "In My Heart"
11. "Feeling So Real"
12. "We Are All Made of Stars"
13. "Move"
14. "Honey"
15. "Slipping Away (Crier la Vie)" (Radio Mix)
  - featuring Mylène Farmer
United States (Disc 2)
1. "Bodyrock" (Olav Basoski's Da Hot Funk Da Freak Funk Remix)
2. "Why Does My Heart Feel So Bad?" (Ferry Corsten Remix)
3. "Natural Blues" (Perfecto Dub)
4. "South Side" (Pete Heller Park Lane Dub)
5. "We Are All Made of Stars" (Timo Maas Vocal Remix)
6. "Extreme Ways" (DJ Tiesto's Vocal Remix)
7. "Jam for the Ladies" (Nevins Club Blaster Remix)
8. "Lift Me Up" (Mylo Mix)
9. "Raining Again" (Steve Angello's Vocal Mix)
10. "Dream About Me" (Booka Shade Remix)
11. "Slipping Away" (Axwell Vocal Mix)
International (Disc 2)
1. "Bodyrock"
2. "Honey" (Fafu's 12" Mix)
  - featuring Kelis
3. "Escapar (Slipping Away)"
  - featuring Amaral
4. "Beautiful"
5. "Run On"
6. "New York, New York" (Rock Mix)
7. "Go" (Vitalic Remix)
8. "In My Heart" (Sandy Rivera Mix)
9. "Porcelain" (Matthias Tanzmann Remix)
10. "Porcelain" (Murk Remix)
11. "Go" (2006 Mix)
12. "God Moving over the Face of the Waters" (Album Version)

DVD

The DVD features 27 music titles by Moby, chronologically ordered. One of the notable omissions was the music video for "South Side", featuring Gwen Stefani.

1. "Go" – 3:38
2. "Hymn" – 3:44
3. "Feeling So Real" – 3:13
4. "Everytime You Touch Me" — 3:52
5. "Into The Blue" – 4:06
6. "That's When I Reach For My Revolver" – 3:57
7. "Come On Baby" – 3:51
8. "James Bond Theme (Moby's re-version)" – 3:28
9. "Honey" – 3:24
10. "Run On" – 3:11
11. "Bodyrock" – 3:37
12. "Why Does My Heart Feel So Bad?" – 3:44
13. "Natural Blues" – 4:15
14. "Find My Baby" – 3:07
15. "Porcelain" – 3:11
16. "We Are All Made Of Stars" – 3:35
17. "Extreme Ways" – 3:33
18. "In This World" – 3:29
19. "Sunday (The Day Before My Birthday)" —3:25
20. "Jam For The Ladies" – 3:23
21. "Make Love F*** War" – 3:23
22. "Lift Me Up" – 3:08
23. "Spiders" – 3:45
24. "Beautiful" – 3:19
25. "Raining Again" – 3:49
26. "Dream About Me" —3:25
27. "Slipping Away" – 3:42

Extra Tracks:

1. "Bodyrock" (audition version) – 3:28
2. "Natural Blues" (German animated version) – 3:03
3. "Porcelain" (US version) – 3:12
4. "Extreme Ways" (bourne identity cut) – 3:31

Go – The Very Best of Moby: Remixed

#	Title	Length	Unedited length
1.	"Natural Blues (Katcha Remix)"	4:13	7:48
2.	"Go (Vitalic Remix)"	4:19	5:14
3.	"In My Heart (Sandy Rivera Mix)"	4:03	7:33
4.	"Slipping Away (Crier la Vie) (Manhattan Clique Club Remix)" (with Mylène Farmer)	4:24	7:30
5.	"New York, New York (Armand Van Helden Long Version)" (featuring Debbie Harry)	4:16	7:38
6.	"Bodyrock (Olav Basoski's Da Hot Funk Da Freak Funk Remix)"	4:00	6:27
7.	"Raining Again (Steve Angello's Vocal Mix)"	3:55	6:55
8.	"Porcelain (Murk Remix)"	4:09	8:38
9.	"Lift Me Up (Mylo Mix)"	4:15	6:45
10.	"In This World (Push Vocal Club Mix)"	3:37	7:56
11.	"Honey (Rollo & Sister Bliss Remix)"	4:02	7:06
12.	"Beautiful (Benny Benassi Remix)"	4:11	7:03
13.	"In My Heart (Manhattan Clique Remix)"	3:19	
14.	"We Are All Made of Stars (Bob Sinclar Main Vocal Mix)"	5:27	5:27
15.	"Go (Trentemøller Remix)"	4:18	7:05
16.	"James Bond Theme (Moby's Re-Version) (C. J. Bolland mix)"	4:49	5:14
17.	"Feeling So Real (Old Skool Mix)"	3:45	5:49
18.	"Why Does My Heart Feel So Bad? (Ferry Corsten Remix)"	3:35	6:46
19.	"Escapar (Slipping Away) (Manhattan Clique Edit)" (with Amaral)	3:41	

== Charts ==
=== Weekly charts ===
Chart (2006)	Peak position
Australian Albums (ARIA)	73
Austrian Albums (Ö3 Austria)	20
Belgian Albums (Ultratop Flanders)	1
Belgian Albums (Ultratop Wallonia)	3
Dutch Albums (Album Top 100)	25
German Albums (Offizielle Top 100)	31
Irish Albums (IRMA)	14
Italian Albums (FIMI)	12
New Zealand Albums (RMNZ)	14
Portuguese Albums (AFP)	15
Scottish Albums (OCC)	18
Spanish Albums (PROMUSICAE)	18
Swedish Albums (Sverigetopplistan)	28
Swiss Albums (Schweizer Hitparade)	4
UK Albums (OCC)	23
US Billboard 200	153
US Top Dance Albums (Billboard)	3

=== Year-end charts ===
Chart (2006)	Position
Belgian Albums (Ultratop Flanders)	23
Belgian Albums (Ultratop Wallonia)	58
Swiss Albums (Schweizer Hitparade)	98
UK Albums (OCC)	193

Chart (2007)	Position
Belgian Albums (Ultratop Flanders)	63

== Certifications ==
Region	Certification	Certified units/sales
Belgium (BRMA)	Gold	25,000^{*}
Ireland (IRMA)	Gold	7,500^{^}
New Zealand (RMNZ)	Gold	7,500^{‡}
Russia (NFPF)	Gold	10,000^{*}
Switzerland (IFPI Switzerland)	Gold	15,000^{^}
United Kingdom (BPI)	Gold	100,000^{^}
^{*} Sales figures based on certification alone.^{^} Shipments figures based on certification alone.^{‡} Sales+streaming figures based on certification alone.
