= 18 B Sides + DVD =

Compilation album by Moby
- Released: November 18, 2003
- Recorded: 1998–2003
- Genre: Electronic; downtempo
- Length: 69:29 (CD); 302:33 (DVD)
- Label: Mute; V2
- Producer: Moby

Moby chronology
18 (2002)	18 B Sides + DVD (2003)	Hotel (2005)

Professional ratings
Review scores
Source	Rating
AllMusic	3/5 stars
Entertainment Weekly	B−
Rolling Stone	2/5 stars

18 B Sides + DVD is a compilation album by American electronic musician Moby. The album's first disc is a CD featuring eight B-sides from his 2002 album 18, as well as five new songs. The second disc is a DVD featuring a live concert at the Pyramid Stage at the Glastonbury Festival on June 29, 2003, various outtakes and studio demos taken from the Play and 18 studio sessions, a megamix with twelve remixes of six different songs from 18, and six music videos for five singles from 18. The DVD also contains an additional non-musical feature entitled Highlights from Moby TV, consisting of several short skits.

The compilation was released in the United States in a CD-style case, and was alternatively released in the United Kingdom in a DVD-style case under the title 18 DVD + B Sides.

== Track listing ==
=== CD ===
All tracks are written by Moby, except where noted.

No.	Title	Writer(s)	Original release:	Length
1.	"Landing"	Moby; Maria Taylor; Orenda Fink	B-side of "We Are All Made of Stars"	3:43
2.	"Love of Strings"		B-side of "Extreme Ways"	6:09
3.	"Nearer"		Previously unreleased	4:17
4.	"Afterlife"		Previously unreleased	3:54
5.	"String Electro"		Previously unreleased	6:55
6.	"Downhill"		B-side of "In This World"	5:18
7.	"Soul to Love"		B-side of "We Are All Made of Stars"	4:26
8.	"Bed"		B-side of "Jam for the Ladies"	4:15
9.	"Piano & Strings"		B-side of "In This World"	5:16
10.	"Horse & Carrot"		Previously unreleased	6:52
11.	"Life's So Sweet"		B-side of "Extreme Ways"	6:30
12.	"ISS"		B-side of "Sunday (The Day Before My Birthday)"	8:44
13.	"Stay"		Previously unreleased	3:10
Total length:				69:29

=== DVD ===
Live at Glastonbury 29.06.03
No.	Title	Writer(s)	Length
1.	"Intro (18)"		2:01
2.	"Natural Blues"	Moby; Vera Hall; Alan Lomax	4:04
3.	"Go"		3:47
4.	"Porcelain"		4:04
5.	"Another Woman"	Moby; Barbara Lynn Ozen	5:18
6.	"Find My Baby"	Moby; Willie Jones	4:32
7.	"In This World"		5:39
8.	"In My Heart"		4:18
9.	"Bring Back My Happiness"		4:01
10.	"We Are All Made of Stars"		4:07
11.	"Why Does My Heart Feel So Bad?"		4:27
12.	"Jam for the Ladies"	Moby; Lana Michele Moorer; Angela Stone; Michael McDermon	2:55
13.	"I Wanna Be Your Dog"	Dave Alexander; Ron Asheton; Scott Asheton; Iggy Pop	2:49
14.	"Bodyrock"	Moby; Gabriel Jackson; Bobby Robinson	4:24
15.	"Honey"	Moby; Bessie Jones; Lomax	4:05
16.	"Honey"	Moby; B. Jones; Lomax	1:43
17.	"Feeling So Real"		5:59
18.	"Creep"	Colin Greenwood; Jonny Greenwood; Edward O'Brien; Philip Selway; Thomas Yorke; Albert Hammond; Mike Hazlewood	5:36
19.	"Credits"		0:35
Total length:			74:24

Outtakes and bonus songs
No.	Title	Writer(s)	Length
1.	"Song We Made Together in 30 Minutes"		4:04
2.	"Great Escape" (original demo)	Moby; Taylor; Fink	2:30
3.	"We Are All Made of Stars" (original slow version)		6:14
4.	"E2D" (outtake from Play)		3:13
5.	"Guitar and Flute" (original demo)		2:29
6.	"18" (original demo)		0:40
7.	"Why Does My Heart Feel So Bad?" (original demo)		4:46
8.	"We Are All Made of Stars" (Slow Synth Mix)		6:58
9.	"KR" (outtake from Play)		8:15
10.	"Flatlands" (B-side outtake from 18)		2:53
11.	"I Love to Watch You Sing" (B-side outtake from 18)		3:57
12.	"American Dry" (B-side outtake from 18)		3:35
13.	"Cunning" (B-side outtake from 18)		4:19
14.	"Waiting" (outtake from 18)		3:58
15.	"641" (B-side outtake from 18)		3:50
16.	"Extreme Ways" (live – rough bootleg mix)		3:53
17.	"Say My Name" (recorded in my bathroom with one mic)		2:37
18.	"So Far Gone" (outtake from 18)		3:27
19.	"Tower" (B-side outtake from 18)		2:28
20.	"Girl Bed" (B-side outtake from 18)		5:26
21.	"Offland"		15:34
Total length:			95:16

Megamix
No.	Title	Writer(s)	Length
1.	"In This World" (Push Vocal Club Mix)		6:07
2.	"Extreme Ways" (DJ Tiësto's Instrumental Remix)		3:38
3.	"Sunday (The Day Before My Birthday)" (West London Deep Club Mix)	Moby; Sylvia Robinson	5:27
4.	"In This World" (Slacker's Rain Before Carnival Mix)		5:06
5.	"We Are All Made of Stars" (DJ Tiësto's Full Vocal Remix)		3:09
6.	"In My Heart" (Ferry Corsten Remix)		6:18
7.	"Jam for the Ladies" (Nevins Reggae Dub Banger)	Moby; Lana Michele Moorer; Angela Stone; Michael McDermon	5:35
8.	"Extreme Ways" (John Creamer & Stephane K Remix)		4:18
9.	"In This World" (ATFC's Southern Fried Vocal)		5:40
10.	"We Are All Made of Stars" (Timo Maas Dub Mix)		3:47
11.	"Jam for the Ladies" (Voodoo Child Remix)	Moby; Moorer; Stone; McDermon	3:16
12.	"In My Heart" (Sean Tyas Misses Twilo Mix)		5:25
Total length:			57:46

Music videos
No.	Title	Writer(s)	Length
1.	"We Are All Made of Stars"		3:32
2.	"In This World"		3:26
3.	"Jam for the Ladies" (with Princess Superstar)	Moby; Lana Michele Moorer; Angela Stone; Michael McDermon	3:20
4.	"Extreme Ways"		3:29
5.	"Jam for the Ladies" (contest winner)	Moby; Moorer; Stone; McDermon	3:24
6.	"Sunday (The Day Before My Birthday)"	Moby; Sylvia Robinson	3:23
Total length:			20:34

B-sides not featured on the album:

- "And I Know" from the single "Sunday (The Day Before My Birthday)"
- "Ace Love" from the single "Jam For The Ladies"

== Personnel ==
Credits for 18 B Sides + DVD adapted from album liner notes.

- Moby – engineering, mixing, production, instruments, writing
- Azure Ray – vocals on "Landing"

Live footage

- Janet Frazer Cook – direction
- Ben Challis – production (exec.)
- Mark Cooper – production (exec.)
- Alison Howe – production

Music videos

- Joseph Kahn – direction ("We Are All Made of Stars")
- Style Wars – direction ("In This World" and "Sunday (The Day Before My Birthday)")
- Simon and Jon – direction ("Jam for the Ladies")
- Wayne Isham – direction ("Extreme Ways")
- Seb Ronjon – direction ("Jam for the Ladies" (contest winner))

== Charts ==
Chart (2003)	Peak position
US Top Dance Albums (Billboard)	4
