= Last Night Remixed =

Remix album by Moby
- Released: November 3, 2008
- Recorded: 2007–2008
- Genre: EDM, house
- Label: Mute
- Producer: Moby

Moby chronology
| Last Night (2008) | Last Night Remixed (2008) | Wait for Me (2009) |

Professional ratings
Review scores
| Source | Rating |
|---|---|
| AllMusic | 4/5 stars |
| musicOMH | 4/5 stars |

Last Night Remixed is an album by Moby, featuring remixes by various producers of tracks from his previous album Last Night. It was released on November 3, 2008 in the UK and November 25, 2008 in the U.S.

Moby said of the album:

Remixes in 2008 are more important than they've ever been, and the great thing about the ubiquity of software like Ableton and Logic is that now almost anyone can be a remixer.

== Track listing ==
1. "I Love to Move in Here" (Holy Ghost! Remix) – 5:03
2. "Ooh Yeah" (Kris Menace Remix) – 3:51
3. "Live for Tomorrow" (Tocadisco Remix) – 5:19
4. "I'm in Love" (Shapeshifters Maximal Remix) – 7:03
5. "Disco Lies" (Freemasons Club Mix) – 5:32
6. "I Love to Move in Here" (Seamus Haji Club Mix) – 6:01
7. "Alice" (General Midi Remix) – 5:15
8. "The Stars" (AC Slater Remix) – 4:36
9. ""Disco Lies" (Spencer & Hill Remix) – 5:27
10. "Alice" (Drop the Lime Heavy Bass Remix) – 3:15
11. "Ooh Yeah" (D.Ramirez Haunted Playground Remix) – 5:49
12. "I'm in Love" (Mason Glowsticks Remix) – 5:25
13. "I Love to Move in Here" (Style of Eye Piano Remix) – 5:54
14. "Last Night" (album version) – 5:47

iTunes bonus tracks
| No. | Title | Length |
|---|---|---|
| 15. | "Album Megamix" | 1:14:23 |
| 16. | "Ooh Yeah" (Moby remix) |

== Charts ==
| Chart (2008) | Peak position |
|---|---|
| US Top Dance/Electronic Albums (Billboard) | 17 |
