= New York, New York (Moby song) =

Single by Moby featuring Debbie Harry

from the album Go – The Very Best of Moby
- Released: October 23, 2006
- Length: 3:38 (album version); 3:47 (single version)
- Label: Mute
- Songwriter: Moby
- Producer: Moby

Moby singles chronology
| "Slipping Away (Crier la vie)" (2006) | "New York, New York" (2006) | "Extreme Ways (Bourne's Ultimatum)" (2007) |

Debbie Harry singles chronology
| "I Want That Man (Remix)" (1999) | "New York, New York" (2006) | "Two Times Blue" (2007) |

Music video
- "Moby Featuring Debbie Harry - New York New York" on YouTube

"New York, New York" is a song by American electronica musician Moby. The song features guest vocals by Debbie Harry. It was released as the first and only single from his compilation album Go – The Very Best of Moby on October 23, 2006.

The cover image of the single depicts Moby himself sitting front of the New York-New York Hotel & Casino on the Las Vegas Strip. The music video was directed by Jen Miller and features a satirical comedy-dance performance by the Varsity Interpretive Dance Squad.

== Track listing ==
- CD single (CDMUTE371)
1. "New York, New York" (single version) – 3:47
2. "Go" (Trentemøller Remix Edit) – 6:00
- CD single (LCDMUTE371)
1. "New York, New York" (Armand Van Helden Long Version) – 7:38
2. "New York, New York" (Tocadisco's NYPD Mix) – 5:56
3. "New York, New York" (Emperor Machine Extended Mix) – 7:17
4. "New York, New York" (Radio Slave's Not Long Now Mix) – 11:22
5. "New York, New York" (radio version – U-MYX format) – 5:32
- 12-inch single (12MUTE371)
1. "New York, New York" (Armand Van Helden Long Version) – 7:38
2. "Go" (Trentemøller Remix) – 7:05
- 12-inch single (L12MUTE371)
1. "New York, New York" (Tocadisco's NYPD Mix) – 5:59
2. "Porcelain" (Murk Remix) – 8:36
3. "In My Heart" (Sandy Rivera Remix) – 7:30
- 12-inch single (XXL12MUTE371)
1. "New York, New York" (Radio Slave's Not Long Now Mix) – 11:22
2. "Porcelain" (Matthias Tanzmann Remix) – 6:40
3. "Porcelain" (Matthias Tanzmann 2nd Remix) – 6:40
- Digital single
1. "New York, New York" (single version) – 3:47
2. "Go" (Trentemøller Remix) – 7:04

== Charts ==
Chart performance for "New York, New York"
| Chart (2006) | Peak position |
|---|---|
| Austria (Ö3 Austria Top 40) | 47 |
| Belgium (Ultratop 50 Flanders) | 38 |
| Belgium Dance (Ultratop Flanders) | 2 |
| CIS Airplay (TopHit) | 81 |
| Germany (GfK) | 69 |
| Global Dance Songs (Billboard) | 10 |
| Ireland (IRMA) | 39 |
| Italy (FIMI) | 17 |
| Netherlands (Single Top 100) | 64 |
| Switzerland (Schweizer Hitparade) | 80 |
| UK Singles (Official Charts) | 43 |
| UK Dance (Official Charts) | 3 |
