= Manhattan Clique =

Electronic music group

Manhattan Clique is a group composed of producers, remixers and songwriters Philip Larsen and Chris Smith, also known as "MHC". Their successes have been reflected in the Music Week Club and Pop charts in the UK, plus the Billboard dance chart in the US, as well as frequent radio play.

The duo have worked with artists including Katy Perry, Lady Gaga, Timbaland, Nicole Scherzinger, La Roux, Britney Spears, The Veronicas, The Saturdays, Keri Hilson, Esmee Denters and Toni Braxton. 2010–11 remixes have included Chris Brown, Diana Vickers, Example, Nelly Furtado, Ed Drewett, Katy Perry (four times), Fenech-Soler, Lady Gaga, Studio Killers and others.

Manhattan Clique have also worked with popular European artists, including French musician Mylène Farmer, whose duet with Moby 'Slipping Away' was Manhattan Clique's first Number One production (as well as Moby's first Number One single anywhere in the world), spending several weeks at the top of the French charts in 2006.

Manhattan Clique has also worked with electronic music acts, including Orchestral Manoeuvres in the Dark, Human League, Soft Cell, The B-52 and Erasure. They co-wrote and produced Erasure frontman Andy Bell's "Electric Blue" album, which also featured Jake Shears (Scissor Sisters) and Claudia Brücken (Propaganda). Larsen has additionally won a Grammy award for his production on Kylie Minogue's "Come Into My World", a track from her multi-platinum album "Fever", and also collaborates with Darren Stokes under the name of "M-3ox".

== Remixes ==
- 2001 Mirwais "I Can't Wait"
- 2001 Soft Cell "Torch"
- 2001 The Lighthouse Family "Happy"
- 2001 The Human League "Shameless"
- 2002 Sophie Ellis-Bextor "Get Over You"
- 2002 The Human League "(Keep Feeling) Fascination 2003"
- 2002 Soft Cell "The Night"
- 2002 Erasure "Solsbury Hill"
- 2002 Erasure "Make Me Smile (Come Up and See Me)"
- 2003 The Human League "The Things That Dreams Are Made Of"
- 2003 Liberty X "Jumpin'"
- 2003 Sophie Ellis-Bextor "Mixed Up World"
- 2003 Vitamin C "Last Night"
- 2003 Holly Valance "Desire"
- 2004 Airlock "I Am"
- 2004 Erasure "Breathe"
- 2004 The B-52's "Mesopotamia"
- 2004 The Knife "Take My Breath Away"
- 2005 The B-52's "Whammy Kiss"
- 2005 The B-52's "Loveland"
- 2005 Larry Tee featuring Andy Bell "Matthew"
- 2005 Stereophonics "Superman"
- 2005 Chromeo "Needy Girl"
- 2005 Moby "Raining Again"
- 2005 Moby "Dream About Me"
- 2005 Goldfrapp "Ooh La La"
- 2005 Angel Moraes "If Music Is Your Life"
- 2005 Moby "Beautiful"
- 2005 Moby "Slipping Away"
- 2005 Fischerspooner "A Kick In the Teeth"
- 2005 Stereophonics "Devil"
- 2005 Andy Bell "Crazy"
- 2005 Andy Bell "Electric Blue"
- 2005 The B-52's "Private Idaho"
- 2006 Angel Moraes "Never Ending"
- 2006 Moby & Mylène Farmer "Slipping Away"
- 2006 SuperJupiter "You Know"
- 2006 Formatic "State Of Play"
- 2006 Matinée Club "Discothèque Français"
- 2006 Boogaloo Stu "Magnetic Heart"
- 2006 Rinôçérôse "Cubicle"
- 2006 Matinée Club "Tokyo Girls"
- 2006 Lorraine "Transatlantic Flight"
- 2006 Onetwo "Home"
- 2006 Moby and Amaral "Slipping Away – Escapar"
- 2006 Strike "U Sure Do"
- 2007 Moby "In My Heart"
- 2007 Myriam Abel "Qui Je Suis"
- 2007 I Am Finn "Hard"
- 2007 The Grid "Put Your Hands Together"
- 2007 S-Express "Stupid Girls"
- 2007 B-52's "Devil In My Car"
- 2007 Soft Cell "Bedsitter"
- 2007 Soft Cell "Surrender"
- 2008 Mylène Farmer "Dégénération"
- 2008 Mylène Farmer "Appelle mon numéro"
- 2008 Goldfrapp "Ride A White Horse"
- 2008 Katy Perry "Hot n Cold"
- 2008 Iglu & Hartly "In This City"
- 2008 Ida Maria "Oh My God"
- 2008 Erasure "Always 2009"
- 2009 The Veronicas "Untouched"
- 2009 Katy Perry "Waking Up In Vegas"
- 2009 Britney Spears "Radar"
- 2009 Lady Gaga "Boys Boys Boys"
- 2009 La Roux "Bulletproof"
- 2009 Lily Allen "Fuck You"
- 2009 Skint & Demoralised "Red Lipstick"
- 2009 The Saturdays "Forever Is Over"
- 2009 Keri Hilson "I Like"
- 2009 Esmee Denters "Admit It"
- 2009 Timbaland feat. SoShy and Nelly Furtado "Morning After Dark"
- 2009 Chris Brown "Transform Ya"
- 2009 Britney Spears "3"
- 2009 Kajagoogoo "White Feathers"
- 2010 Alphabeat "Hole In My Heart"
- 2010 Toni Braxton "Yesterday"
- 2010 Chris Brown "Crawl"
- 2010 Diana Vickers "Once"
- 2010 Katy Perry "California Gurls"
- 2010 OneRepublic "Marching On"
- 2010 Example Last Ones Standing
- 2010 Katy Perry "Teenage Dream"
- 2011 Katy Perry "E.T."
- 2011 Lady GaGa "Born This Way"
- 2011 Barbarellas Body Rock
- 2011 MNEK "If Truth Be Told"
- 2011 Wretch 32 "Forgiveness"
- 2011 Frida Gold "Unsere Liebe Ist Aus Gold"
- 2011 Keri Hilson "Lose Control"
- 2011 Studio Killers "Ode To The Bouncer"
- 2011 Nicole Scherzinger "Wet"
- 2011 Wretch 32 Feat. Josh Kumra "Don't Go"
- 2011 Nicole Scherzinger "Right There"
- 2011 Fenech-Soler "Stop and Stare"
- 2011 Wonderland "This Is Not A Love Song"
- 2011 Nelly Furtado "Night Is Young"
- 2012 The Asteroids Galaxy Tour – "Heart Attack"
- 2012 Studio Killers "Eros and Apollo"
- 2012 Carly Rae Jepsen "Call Me Maybe"
- 2012 All Mankind "Simple Desire"
- 2012 Kids On Bridges "Anywhere But The Middle" (feat. J2K)
- 2012 Angel "Wonderful"
- 2012 Girls Aloud "Something New"
- 2013 Alison Moyet "When I Was Your Girl"
- 2013 Demi Lovato "Heart Attack"
- 2013 Orchestral Manoeuvres in the Dark "Metroland"
- 2013 Emeli Sande "Next To Me"
- 2013 Back Street Boys "In A World Like This"
- 2013 Ellie Goulding "Burn"
- 2014 Manhattan Clique featuring Lydia Kaye "Torn In Two"
- 2014 DJ Fresh Make U Bounce – (Manhattan Clique Remix) (feat. Little Nikki) MINISTRY OF SOUND
- 2015 Madyx – Some Kisses
- 2015 Miel de Botton – Magnetic
- 2015 Miel de Botton – Dazzle Me Diamond
- 2017 Orchestral Manoeuvres in the Dark – "The Punishment of Luxury"
- 2017 Erasure – "Oh What A World" (Manhattan Clique Remix)
- 2017 Brett Vogel – "Burn for You"
- 2017 Brett Vogel – "Can't Stop Now"
- 2018 Roald Hughes – "Medicine"
- 2021 Ridi – "Top Guy"
- 2021 Jay Saturn – "Live My Life"
- 2022 Soft Cell and Pet Shop Boys – "Purple Zone"
- 2022 Soft Cell – "Nostalgia Machine"
- 2022 Rose Ranger – "Confession"
