= Last Night (Moby album) =

Studio album by Moby
- Released: March 29, 2008
- Recorded: 2007
- Studios: Moby's home studio (Manhattan, New York)
- Genre: Electronic dance music
- Length: 62:51
- Label: Mute
- Producer: Moby

Moby chronology
The BioShock EP (2007)	Last Night (2008)	Last Night Remixed (2008)

Moby studio albums chronology
Hotel (2005)	Last Night (2008)	Wait for Me (2009)

Singles from Last Night
- 1. "Disco Lies" Released: January 21, 2008; 2. "Alice" Released: March 10, 2008; 3. "I Love to Move in Here" Released: July 1, 2008; 4. "Ooh Yeah" Released: November 23, 2008

Last Night is the eighth studio album by American electronica singer, songwriter, and musician Moby, released on March 29, 2008, by Mute Records. The album was described by critics as a more dance-oriented release than Moby's previous few albums. Upon release, the album received mostly positive reviews.

== Background and recording ==
In October 2006, Moby released his greatest hits compilation Go – The Very Best of Moby. Following its release, he decided to start work on his next studio album, his first since Hotel in 2005. Moby adopted a conceptual theme in regard to the album's shape, structuring it like an "epic night out" in New York City, "moving from the building excitement of the early evening, to peak-time euphoria, to 2 a.m. confusion, and the blissful peace of the early morning New York City sunrise." Moby was influenced by this idea from living in Manhattan and being exposed to a variety of live dance music, which he wanted to reflect on Last Night: "I wanted to condense that 8 hour going out experience into 65 minutes",

The album was recorded in Moby's home studio in Manhattan and features a number of guest vocalists, including MC Grandmaster Caz (one of the writers of "Rapper's Delight", which boosted the popularity of sampling, a common method to make the music on Moby's 1999 album Play), Sylvia from the band Kudu, British MC Aynzli, and the Nigeria-based 419 Squad. Moby picked "Last Night" as his favourite track on the album.

On his official website, Moby stated that this album is "a lot more dance-oriented and electronic than my last few albums, probably as a result of all of the DJing I've been doing lately." Moby made the album as a tribute to his favorite city in the world:

Last Night is basically a love letter to dance music in New York City. What I love about the New York approach to dance music is the eclecticism and the open minded-ness on the part of the musicians, the DJ's, and the people in the bars and clubs.

== Promotion and release ==
Professional ratings
Aggregate scores
Source	Rating
Metacritic	63/100
Review scores
Source	Rating
AllMusic	3.5/5 stars
The A.V. Club	B
The Guardian	3/5 stars
The Independent	3/5 stars
Mojo	3/5 stars
Pitchfork	5.2/10
Q	3/5 stars
Rolling Stone	4/5 stars
Spin	3/5 stars
URB	4/5 stars

"Disco Lies" was released as a single on January 21, 2008. The second single, "Alice", was released on March 10.

Last Night was released on March 29 by record label Mute. "I Love to Move in Here" was released on July 1, and the album's final single, "Ooh Yeah", was released on November 28.

== Critical reception ==
Last Night received mostly positive reviews, with an average score of 63/100 on Metacritic from 21 professional critics. Rolling Stone called the album a "return to form," while MusicOMH named it "probably his best and most cohesive album since 'Play.'" In a more mixed assessment, Andy Kellman of AllMusic said that Moby "was as blissfully out of touch with modern club music as he is current," while Joshua Klein of Pitchfork said that "these may be songs designed to make you move but the results are only intermittently rousing." More critically, The Boston Globe wrote that "Last Night is a remarkably impersonal work," while the Los Angeles Times concluded that "Last Night feels like a cold academic exercise, as though Moby were compiling a collection of beats for future examination by an alien race curious about our after-hours ways."

== Track listing ==
All tracks are written by Moby, except where noted.

No.	Title	Writer(s)	Length
1.	"Ooh Yeah"		5:18
2.	"I Love to Move in Here"	Moby; Grandmaster Caz	4:45
3.	"257.Zero"		3:38
4.	"Everyday It's 1989"		3:40
5.	"Live for Tomorrow"		4:02
6.	"Alice"	Moby; Ainsley Robert Jones^{[a]}; Segun Olakunle Adegunwa^{[a]}; Harry Olufemi Williams^{[a]}	4:27
7.	"Hyenas"	Moby; Arthur Rimbaud (poem)	3:35
8.	"I'm in Love"		3:43
9.	"Disco Lies"		3:23
10.	"The Stars"		4:21
11.	"Degenerates"		3:58
12.	"Sweet Apocalypse"		5:19
13.	"Mothers of the Night"		3:19
14.	"Last Night"	Moby; Sylvia Gordon	9:23
Total length:			62:51

Amazon MP3 bonus track
No.	Title	Length
15.	"Sweetest"	4:48
Total length:		67:39

iTunes bonus track
No.	Title	Length
15.	"Land Of"	5:31
Total length:		68:22

Notes

- ^{^[a]}Credited respectively as "Aynzli Jones and S.O.Simple and Smokey from 419 Squad".
- "Degenerates" is an alternate mix of "Raining Again" b-side "It's OK".
- "Last Night" (0:00–4:53) shares the track with hidden song "Lucy Vida" (4:54–9:23).

== Release history ==
Country	Release date
Australia	March 29, 2008
United States	April 1, 2008
United Kingdom	May 12, 2008

== Charts ==
=== Weekly charts ===
Chart (2008)	Peak position
Australian Albums (ARIA)	20
Austrian Albums (Ö3 Austria)	4
Belgian Albums (Ultratop Flanders)	2
Belgian Albums (Ultratop Wallonia)	19
Canadian Albums (Billboard)	6
Danish Albums (Hitlisten)	25
Dutch Albums (Album Top 100)	22
Finnish Albums (Suomen virallinen lista)	38
French Albums (SNEP)	12
German Albums (Offizielle Top 100)	10
Irish Albums (IRMA)	26
Italian Albums (FIMI)	6
New Zealand Albums (RMNZ)	30
Portuguese Albums (AFP)	28
Scottish Albums (Official Charts)	31
Spanish Albums (Promusicae)	53
Swedish Albums (Sverigetopplistan)	40
Swiss Albums (Schweizer Hitparade)	6
UK Albums (Official Charts)	28
US Billboard 200	27
US Top Dance Albums (Billboard)	2

=== Year-end charts ===
Chart (2008)	Position
Belgian Albums (Ultratop Flanders)	38
French Albums (SNEP)	142
Swiss Albums (Schweizer Hitparade)	100
US Top Dance/Electronic Albums (Billboard)	14

== Certifications ==
Region	Certification	Certified units/sales
Belgium (BRMA)	Gold	15,000^{*}
France (SNEP)	Gold	75,000^{*}
Russia (NFPF)	Gold	10,000^{*}
Switzerland (IFPI Switzerland)	Gold	15,000^{^}
^{*} Sales figures based on certification alone.^{^} Shipments figures based on certification alone.
