= Extreme Ways =

2002 single by Moby

Single by Moby

from the album 18
- B-side: "Love of Strings"; "Life's So Sweet"
- Released: June 24, 2002
- Genre: Post-punk
- Length: 3:57 (album version); 3:32 (single version)
- Label: V2
- Songwriter: Moby
- Producer: Moby

Moby singles chronology
"We Are All Made of Stars" (2002)	"Extreme Ways" (2002)	"In This World" (2002)

Music videos
- "Extreme Ways" on YouTube; "Extreme Ways" (The Bourne Identity (2002) version) on YouTube

"Extreme Ways" is a song by American electronica musician Moby. It was released as the second single from his sixth studio album 18 on June 24, 2002. The track is known for its usage at the conclusion of all five Bourne films. New versions of the song were recorded for the third, fourth, and fifth films of the series: The Bourne Ultimatum, The Bourne Legacy, and Jason Bourne respectively. In 2024, Dutch DJ Armin van Buuren and Moby released a reimagined version of the song as a single through Armada Music.

== Composition ==
"Extreme Ways" samples the strings notes from Hugo Winterhalter's cover of "Everybody's Talkin'", and the drum beats of Melvin Bliss's "Synthetic Substitution".

== Music videos ==
Two music videos was made for the song were directed by Wayne Isham, both the original and The Bourne Identity (2002) film version, which was later included on Moby's 18 B Sides + DVD compilation and the film's "Explosive Extended Edition" DVD.

== Bourne versions ==
For the first two Bourne films in the series, The Bourne Identity and The Bourne Supremacy, the original version of the song was used during the closing credits. In the first film, it was chosen by director Doug Liman, and in the second it reappeared because the producers could not commission a new song due to time constraints. The franchise's producer, Frank Marshall, declared that "when we first heard 'Extreme Ways', we loved it because the rhythm and lyrics embodied all the characteristics we were going for in the movie." Regarding the return, Kathy Nelson, the president of film music for Universal Pictures, stated that the line of thought was "There's no better song. It's still the perfect lyric, perfect attitude, and perfect energy, so why not let this be Jason Bourne's theme?"

For the third film in the series, The Bourne Ultimatum, a new version, "Extreme Ways (Bourne's Ultimatum)", was recorded and released both on that film's soundtrack on July 31, 2007, and as a one-track CD single on September 17, 2007.

For the fourth film in the series, The Bourne Legacy, another version, "Extreme Ways (Bourne's Legacy)", was recorded and released on that film's soundtrack on August 7, 2012. This version was recorded partly at Moby's home studio in Los Angeles and partly at Sony Pictures Studios. At Sony, Moby worked with a 110 piece orchestra with the help of composer James Newton Howard, who scored the film, and composer Joseph Trapanese. In addition to the lyrical track, the group also recorded a purely orchestral version of the song. Both versions were released as singles for digital download on July 31, 2012.

For the fifth film in the series, Jason Bourne, Moby recorded another version, "Extreme Ways (Jason Bourne)", that was released on that film's soundtrack on July 29, 2016.

== Armin van Buuren and Moby version ==
In 2024, Dutch DJ and record producer Armin van Buuren and Moby released a new version of "Extreme Ways". It was released on November 22, 2024, through Armada Music.

The version was first used by van Buuren as the opening track of his set at Ultra Music Festival in Miami and later featured in his 2024 live sets, including at Tomorrowland. The version combines piano-led builds with a dance-oriented drop. Van Buuren said that he had long wanted to work with Moby and was inspired to make the version after rewatching the Bourne film series, while Moby said that he approved of the new version after hearing van Buuren's production and seeing footage of it being used to open live sets.

An official visualizer for the version was released on van Buuren's YouTube channel. The song was later included on the track listing of van Buuren's 2025 album Breathe.

== Track listings ==
- CD single (CDMUTE270)
1. "Extreme Ways" – 3:32
2. "Love of Strings" – 6:11
3. "Life's So Sweet" – 6:31
4. "Extreme Ways" (video) – 3:31
- CD single - Limited Edition (LCDMUTE270)
1. "Extreme Ways" – 3:32
2. Album excerpts – 1:55
  1. "Signs of Love"
  2. "Sunday (The Day Before My Birthday)"
  3. "In My Heart"
  4. "Jam for the Ladies"
- 12-inch single (12MUTE270)
1. "Extreme Ways" (DJ Tiësto's Vocal Remix) – 7:11
2. "Extreme Ways" (Junior Jack's Club Mix) – 11:37
- 12-inch single (L12MUTE270)
1. "Extreme Ways" (John Creamer + Stephane K Remix) – 9:25
2. "Extreme Ways" (Lee Coombs Remix) – 8:36
- 12-inch single (V2AB-27761-1)
1. "Extreme Ways" (Lee Coombs Remix) – 8:36
2. "Extreme Ways" (John Creamer + Stephane K Remix) – 9:25
- 12-inch single (V2AB-27762-1)
1. "Extreme Ways" (Junior Jack's Club Mix) – 11:37
2. "Extreme Ways" (DJ Tiësto's Instrumental Remix) – 6:27

== Charts ==
=== Original version ===
Chart (2002)	Peak position
Belgium Dance (Ultratop Flanders)	27
France (SNEP)	53
Italy (FIMI)	27
Scottish Singles Sales (Official Charts)	29
Switzerland (Schweizer Hitparade)	91
UK Singles (Official Charts)	39
UK Dance (Official Charts)	7
UK Independent (Official Charts)	5
US Dance Club Songs (Billboard)	12

=== "Bourne's Ultimatum" version ===
Chart (2007)	Peak position
Ireland (IRMA)	48
UK Singles (Official Charts)	45

== Certifications ==
Certifications for "Extreme Ways (Bourne's Ultimatum)"
Region	Certification	Certified units/sales
United Kingdom (BPI) "Extreme Ways (Bourne's Ultimatum)"	Silver	200,000^{‡}
^{‡} Sales+streaming figures based on certification alone.

== Release history ==
Region	Date	Format(s)	Label(s)	Ref(s).
United States	June 24, 2002	Alternative radio	V2	
Australia	July 29, 2002	CD	Virgin; Mute	
Japan	August 17, 2002	CD	V2	
United Kingdom	August 19, 2002	12-inch vinyl; CD	Mute	
United Kingdom	September 9, 2002	Limited-edition 12-inch vinyl	Mute	
