= I Love to Move in Here =

Single by Moby

from the album Last Night
- Released: July 1, 2008
- Studio: Moby's home studio (Manhattan, New York)
- Length: 4:45
- Label: Mute
- Songwriter: Moby
- Producer: Moby

Moby singles chronology
"Alice" (2008)	"I Love to Move in Here" (2008)	"Ooh Yeah" (2008)

Music video
- "I Love to Move in Here" on YouTube

"I Love to Move in Here" is a song by American electronica musician Moby from his eighth studio album Last Night. It was released on July 1, 2008, as the album's third single. The track features vocals from rapper Grandmaster Caz and singer Chrissi Poland. It was included on the soundtrack for the 2008 movie Two Lovers.

"I Love to Move in Here" became Moby's second chart-topper from Last Night on the Billboard Dance Club Songs chart following "Disco Lies".

== Music video ==
The octopus entering the club in full dress

The music video for "I Love to Move in Here" was directed by Toben Seymour while Ross Reid served as the clip's cinematographer. It was released on YouTube and Vimeo on May 15, 2008. Set in New York City and soundtracked by a remixed radio version of the song, the music video features the adventures of an introverted octopus who goes out clubbing. Initially dressed in a jump suit with matching boots, a hat, and Groucho glasses to hide his identity, the octopus slowly comes becomes less shy as the night progresses; after first going to the bar to drink by himself, he then moves to the dance-floor and starts dancing after being encouraged to do so by Moby. The octopus eventually finds himself on stage, and is them reprimanded by one of the club's bouncers for potentially putting himself in harms way and being trampled, though the bouncer eventually relents and allows him to reenter after the octopus becomes visually upset. Eventually, the octopus disrobes and reveals his true, fluorescent self, extending his eight limbs and letting loose as he dances through the club while being blissfully taken with the song.

The video stars Moby as a clubgoer, and features Grandmaster Caz rapping his verse on the club's stage. New York City-based drag queen Lady Bunny is also seen performing on the club's stage throughout the video. The octopus was puppeteered by Seymour and Lindsey Briggs.

== Track listing ==
CD single (CDMUTE391)

1. "I Love to Move in Here" (radio version) – 3:29
2. "I Love to Move in Here" (Seamus Haji radio edit) – 3:41

CD single (LCDMUTE391)

1. "I Love to Move in Here" (Radio version) – 3:29
2. "I Love to Move in Here" (Seamus Haji remix) – 8:15
3. "I Love to Move in Here" (Holy Ghost! remix) – 7:24
4. "I Love to Move in Here" (Crookers Bass in Here mix) – 5:26
5. "I Love to Move in Here" (Crookers Crack mix) – 4:35
6. "I Love to Move in Here" (Style of Eye Piano remix) – 7:15

Digital single – remixes

1. "I Love to Move in Here" (radio version) – 3:29
2. "I Love to Move in Here" (Proxy remix) – 4:29
3. "I Love to Move in Here" (Clouded Vision's Acid Jazz remix) – 5:41
4. "I Love to Move in Here" (Holy Ghost! remix) – 7:24
5. "I Love to Move in Here" (Holy Ghost! remix Edit) – 3:54
6. "I Love to Move in Here" (Popof remix) – 6:03
7. "I Love to Move in Here" (Crookers Crack mix) – 4:35
8. "I Love to Move in Here" (Crookers Lemmesee mix) – 4:44
9. "I Love to Move in Here" (Crookers Bass in Here mix) – 5:26
10. "I Love to Move in Here" (Seamus Haji remix) – 4:04
11. "I Love to Move in Here" (Style of Eye Piano remix) – 7:15
12. "I Love to Move in Here" (Style of Eye remix) – 7:17

== Charts ==
=== Weekly charts ===
Chart (2008)	Peak position
Belgium (Ultratop 50 Flanders)	47
Romania (Romanian Top 100)	73
US Dance Club Songs (Billboard)	1
Venezuela Pop Rock (Record Report)	2

=== Year-end charts ===
Chart (2008)	Position
US Dance Club Songs (Billboard)	21
