= Lift Me Up (Moby song) =

2005 single by Moby

Single by Moby

from the album Hotel
- B-side: "Mulholland"
- Written: 2004
- Released: February 28, 2005
- Genre: Electronica, electronic rock
- Length: 3:14 (album version); 3:08 (single version)
- Label: Mute
- Songwriter: Moby
- Producer: Moby

Moby singles chronology
"Make Love Fuck War" (2004)	"Lift Me Up" (2005)	"Raining Again" (2005)

Music video
- "Moby - 'Lift Me Up' (Evan Bernard Version) (Official Video)" on YouTube

"Lift Me Up" is a song by American electronica musician Moby. It was released as the first single from his seventh studio album, Hotel (2005), on February 28, 2005. It achieved success in many countries, including Italy, the United Kingdom, France, Belgium, Denmark, Finland, and Spain, where it was a top ten hit.

== Background ==
Moby has stated that the theme of the song is about the rise of global intolerance and fundamentalism. The word "Ama" in the chorus ("lift me up, higher now, Ama"), that was often misheard and vastly misinterpreted, was meant to sound like a name of an unspecific deity. According to Moby, it was based on the "ah" sound that commonly appears in the names of God in many languages.

The female vocal solo in the bridge is performed by singer Shayna Steele.

== Use in media ==
In 2005, the song was used in an Italian commercial for Vodafone; and on ITV in the United Kingdom, for the theme of their Formula One coverage from 2006 to 2008. As well, the song was featured in the fourteenth episode of the third season of Doctor Who Confidential. The song is also featured in the 2005 racing video game Asphalt: Urban GT 2 as the soundtrack for the Nintendo DS version's main menu and the game's trailer.

== Track listings ==
- CD single (CDMUTE340)
1. "Lift Me Up" (radio mix) – 3:08
2. "Mulholland" – 8:31
- CD single (LCDMUTE340)
1. "Lift Me Up" (Mylo Mix) – 6:44
2. "Lift Me Up" (Superdiscount Mix) – 6:51
3. "Lift Me Up" (Abe Duque Mix) – 7:10
4. "Lift Me Up" (album version) – 3:22
5. "Lift Me Up" (Superdiscount Mix radio edit) – 3:11

Contains bonus Digimpro remix software

- 12-inch single (12MUTE340)
1. "Lift Me Up" (Mylo Mix) – 6:44
2. "Lift Me Up" (Superdiscount Mix) – 6:51
3. "Lift Me Up" (Abe Duque Dub) – 7:10
- Digital single
1. "Lift Me Up" (radio mix) – 3:08
2. "Mulholland" – 8:31
3. "Lift Me Up" (Mylo Mix) – 6:44
4. "Lift Me Up" (Superdiscount Mix) – 6:51
5. "Lift Me Up" (Abe Duque Mix) – 7:10
6. "Lift Me Up" – 3:17

== Personnel ==
- Moby – vocals, instrumentation, writing, engineering, production
- Brian Sperber – engineering, mixing
- Scott Frassetto – drums
- Brian Sperber – backing vocals
- Jason Candler – backing vocals
- Kurt Uenala – backing vocals
- Orion Simprini – backing vocals
- Shayna Steele – backing vocals
- Graphic Therapy and NYC – artwork
- Danny Clinch – photography

== Charts ==
=== Weekly charts ===
Chart (2005)	Peak position
Austria (Ö3 Austria Top 40)	12
Belgium (Ultratop 50 Flanders)	8
Belgium (Ultratop 50 Wallonia)	12
Belgium Dance (Ultratop Flanders)	1
CIS Airplay (TopHit)	21
Czech Republic (IFPI)	24
Denmark (Tracklisten)	8
Europe (Eurochart Hot 100)	8
Finland (Suomen virallinen lista)	10
France (SNEP)	6
Germany (GfK)	12
Greece (IFPI)	4
Hungary (Rádiós Top 40)	32
Hungary (Single Top 40)	5
Ireland (IRMA)	25
Ireland Dance (IRMA)	4
Italy (FIMI)	2
Netherlands (Dutch Top 40)	32
Netherlands (Single Top 100)	23
New Zealand (Recorded Music NZ)	39
Russia Airplay (TopHit)	22
Scottish Singles Sales (Official Charts)	10
Spain (Promusicae)	3
Sweden (Sverigetopplistan)	38
Switzerland (Schweizer Hitparade)	24
UK Singles (Official Charts)	18
UK Dance (Official Charts)	6

=== Year-end charts ===
Chart (2005)	Position
Belgium (Ultratop 50 Flanders)	39
Belgium (Ultratop 50 Wallonia)	59
Europe (Eurochart Hot 100)	42
France (SNEP)	35
Germany (Media Control GfK)	60
Italy (FIMI)	21
Romania (Romanian Top 100)	64
Russia Airplay (TopHit)	141
Venezuela (Record Report)	29

== Certifications ==
Region	Certification	Certified units/sales
France (SNEP)	Gold	200,000^{*}
^{*} Sales figures based on certification alone.
