= Make Love Fuck War =

Single by Moby and Public Enemy

from the album New Whirl Odor and XXX: State of the Union (Music from the Motion Picture)
- Released: July 2, 2004
- Length: 3:24
- Label: Mute
- Songwriter(s): Chuck D; Flavor Flav; Moby
- Producer(s): Moby

Moby singles chronology
"Jam for the Ladies" (2003)	"Make Love Fuck War" (2004)	"Lift Me Up" (2005)

Public Enemy singles chronology
"Do You Wanna Go Our Way???" (1999)	"Make Love Fuck War" (2004)	"Black Is Back" (2007)

Audio video
- "MKLVFKWR" on YouTube

"Make Love Fuck War", also called "MKLVFKWR", is a song by electronica musician Moby and hip hop group Public Enemy. It was released as a single on July 2, 2004. The song is featured on Unity: The Official Athens 2004 Olympic Games Album and Public Enemy's album, New Whirl Odor. It was initially released as a protest to the 2003 Iraq War; the music video combines footage from 2002–2003 urban protests against the war with footage from previous concerts of both participants in the single.

The track was part of a wave of anti-war songs by popular artists in response to US action in Iraq and Afghanistan, revelations about the mistreatment of prisoners in Abu Ghraib and Guantanamo Bay, and the perception that domestic needs were being neglected due to the costs of war. Make Love Fuck War called for individual resistance, grassroots struggle, and "power to the people" in support of peace.

== Track listing ==
All lyrics are written by Chuck D and Flavor Flav; all music is composed by Moby

No.	Title	Length
1.	"Make Love Fuck War"	3:24
2.	"Make Love Fuck War" (Instrumental)	4:20
3.	"Make Love Fuck War" (Acappella)	3:55

== Charts ==
Chart (2004)	Peak position
Italy (FIMI)	48
