= Slipping Away (Moby song) =

2006 single by Moby

Single by Moby

from the album Hotel
- B-side: "Where You End"
- Released: January 23, 2006
- Length: 3:37 (album version); 3:42 (single version)
- Label: Mute
- Songwriter: Moby
- Producer: Moby

Moby singles chronology
"Beautiful" (2005)	"Slipping Away" (2006)	"Escapar (Slipping Away)" (2006)

"Slipping Away" is a song by American electronic musician Moby. It was released as the sixth and final single from his seventh studio album Hotel on January 23, 2006. It served as the fourth single from Hotel in the United Kingdom, where it peaked at number 53 on the UK Singles Chart, and as the sixth international single from the album. The single version features British singer-songwriter Alison Moyet on backing vocals.

Moby also recorded two alternate versions of the song, which were later released as singles: "Escapar (Slipping Away)" with Spanish rock band Amaral, which reached number three in Spain, and "Slipping Away (Crier la vie)" with French recording artist Mylène Farmer, which topped the charts in France and Belgium.

== Track listing ==
CD single (CDMUTE365)
No.	Title	Length
1.	"Slipping Away" (single version)	3:42
2.	"Slipping Away" (MHC radio edit)	3:37

CD single (LCDMUTE365) / digital single
No.	Title	Length
1.	"Slipping Away" (Axwell Vocal Mix)	7:31
2.	"Slipping Away" (Axwell Instrumental Mix)	7:31
3.	"Slipping Away" (MHC Extended Remix)	6:47
4.	"Slipping Away" (Focus People That Slip Remix by Mathew Jonson)	9:25
5.	"Slipping Away" (Zloot Remix)	4:26

12-inch single (12MUTE365)
No.	Title	Length
1.	"Slipping Away" (Axwell Vocal Mix)	7:31
2.	"Where You End" (Tiga's All I Want Is to Be Sampled Mix)	7:04

== Charts ==
=== Weekly charts ===
Chart (2006–07)	Peak position
Belgium (Ultratip Bubbling Under Flanders)	9
Belgium Dance (Ultratop)	8
CIS Airplay (TopHit)	35
Czech Republic Airplay (ČNS IFPI)	16
Germany (GfK)	63
Greece (IFPI)	8
Italy (FIMI)	44
Russia Airplay (TopHit)	35
Spain (PROMUSICAE)	10
UK Singles (OCC)	53
UK Dance (OCC)	14

=== Year-end charts ===
Chart (2006)	Position
CIS (Tophit)	186
Russia Airplay (TopHit)	197

== Moby and Amaral version ==
"Escapar (Slipping Away)"

Single by Moby and Amaral
- Released: 2006
- Recorded: 2005
- Length: 3:42
- Label: Mute
- Songwriter: Moby
- Producer: Moby

Moby singles chronology
"Slipping Away" (2006)	"Escapar (Slipping Away)" (2006)	"Slipping Away (Crier la vie)" (2006)

The release of Hotel in some Spanish-speaking countries included a Spanish version called "Escapar (Slipping Away)", with the Spanish rock duo Amaral. It peaked at No. 3 in Spain.

=== Track listing ===
CD single (0094637506509)
No.	Title	Length
1.	"Escapar (Slipping Away)"	3:42
2.	"Slipping Away" (single version)	3:42
3.	"Escapar (Slipping Away)" (video)	3:42

Digital single
No.	Title	Length
1.	"Escapar (Slipping Away)" (Manhattan Clique Club Remix)	7:30

=== Charts ===
Chart (2006)	Peak position
Spain (PROMUSICAE)	3

== Moby and Mylène Farmer version ==
"Slipping Away (Crier la vie)"

Single by Moby and Mylène Farmer
- Released: September 25, 2006
- Recorded: 2005
- Genre: Psy Trance
- Length: 3:38
- Label: Mute
- Songwriter: Moby
- Producer: Moby

Moby singles chronology
"Escapar (Slipping Away)" (2006)	"Slipping Away (Crier la vie)" (2006)	"New York, New York" (2006)

Mylène Farmer singles chronology
"Peut-être toi" (2006)	"Slipping Away (Crier la vie)" (2006)	"Avant que l'ombre... (live)" (2006)

=== Background and release ===
In June 2006, a rumor was launched that Mylène Farmer would record a duet with an international star. Several artists were mentioned, such as Lara Fabian, Benjamin Biolay, Diam's, or Madonna, but especially Robbie Williams who had apparently declared at the 2002 NRJ Music Awards that he would like to work with her. Then the name of Moby was suggested because a possible collaboration with Mylène Farmer had been mentioned in the past by Moby himself. In late August, the purchase order and Moby's official website indicated that the name of the song was "Slipping Away (Crier la vie)".

Produced and remixed by MHC in London, "Slipping Away (Crier la vie)" is a dance version of "Slipping Away" adds French lyrics. On his blog on September 9, 2006, then in the December 16, 2006, edition of the French newspaper Le Parisien, Moby stated that Farmer came to his restaurant Teany in New York and suggested to him that they record a duet version of "Slipping Away", as she had heard the song on his best of and liked it. He explained that she wrote her lyrics in French and they worked together at a distance from each other (New York and Paris).

The song was very regularly aired by all French radio stations, including Fun Radio which aired it several times every day. As the song was very successful, new remixes were made and a second CD maxi and vinyl were released on November 15.

Farmer's 2008 album Point de Suture contains another duet with Moby called "Looking for My Name", which was recorded just after "Slipping Away (Crier la vie)".

=== Music video ===
On September 15, 2006, the website Yahoo! presented the video in preview and five days later, it was broadcast for the first time on the French television channels. On September 23, a TV promo campaign began and the video was aired every hour on the day of the single's release on Europe 2 TV. The video, directed by Hugo Ramirez and available on a track of the CD maxi, is almost the same as that of the original version and is composed of a series of photos representing various events in the United States during the 20th century, plus some new photos (Moby and Farmer when they were babies). The song's lyrics are written in these images.

=== Live performances ===
The song was performed for the first time on the Timeless Tour in 2013, including a virtual duet with Moby.

=== Chart performance ===
The single debuted at number one on the French SNEP Singles Chart on September 30, with 26,019 units. The single remained for 11 weeks in the top ten, 22 weeks in the top 50 and 37 weeks in the top 100. It became Moby's first number one in France and Farmer's fourth, after "Pourvu qu'elles soient douces", "Désenchantée", and "XXL". It was also the single with longest chart trajectory in France for both artists. The song also peaked at number one on French Digital Download Chart and performed well on various airplay charts. On the 2006 Annual Charts, the song ranked at number 22 (physical sales) and number 51 (digital download).

The song was heavily aired on radio: it peaked at number two on the French Airplay Chart, number three on the Power 70 Airplay Chart, number two on the television Airplay Chart, and number 29 on the Club Chart.

=== Formats and track listings ===
CD

France
No.	Title	Length
1.	"Slipping Away"	3:39
2.	"Slipping Away (Extended Remix)"	6:48

CD1 (France)
No.	Title	Length
1.	"Slipping Away"	3:39
2.	"Slipping Away (Axwell Remix)"	7:24
3.	"Slipping Away (Zloot Remix)"	4:38
4.	"Slipping Away (MHC Club Remix)"	7:30

CD2 (France, Germany)
No.	Title	Length
1.	"Slipping Away"	3:39
2.	"Slipping Away (Enzo Mori & Stephan Clark Remix)"	7:10
3.	"Slipping Away (Original Single Version)"	3:41
4.	"Slipping Away" (video)	3:58

Promo (France, Italy)
No.	Title	Length
1.	"Slipping Away"	3:39

Maxi CD promo (France)
No.	Title	Length
1.	"Slipping Away"	3:39
2.	"Slipping Away (Extended Remix)"	6:48
3.	"Slipping Away (Axwell Remix)"	7:24
4.	"Slipping Away (Enzo Mori & Stephan Clark Remix)"	7:10
5.	"Slipping Away (MHC Club Remix)"	7:30

Maxi CD promo (Greece)
No.	Title	Length
1.	"Slipping Away"	3:39
2.	"Slipping Away (MHC 2006 Extended Mix)"	6:48
3.	"Slipping Away (MHC DUB Mix)"	7:24
4.	"Slipping Away (Axwell Remix)"	7:24
5.	"Slipping Away (Zloot Remix)"	4:38

7" vinyl

Limited edition 7" maxi (France)
No.	Title	Length
1.	"Slipping Away"	3:39
2.	"Slipping Away (Extended Remix)"	6:48
3.	"Slipping Away (Enzo Mori & Stephan Clark Remix)"	7:10
4.	"Slipping Away (Axwell Remix)"	7:24
5.	"Slipping Away" (video)	3:58

Limited edition 7" maxi promo (France)
No.	Title	Length
1.	"Slipping Away"	3:39
2.	"Slipping Away (Axwell Remix)"	7:24
3.	"Slipping Away (Zloot Remix)"	4:38
4.	"Slipping Away (MHC Club Remix)"	7:34

=== Official versions ===
Version	Length	Album	Remixed by	Year	Comment
Single Version / Radio Edit	3:39	Go – The Very Best of Moby	MHC aka Philip Larsen and Chis Smith	2006	Remixed version with dance sonorities, with English and French lyrics which alternate. This version is more rhythmic than the original one.
Extended Remix	6:48	—	MHC aka Philip Larsen and Chis Smith	2006	Similar to the previous but longer.
Axwell Remix	7:24	—	Axwell	2006	Used in a scene in the 2008 movie 21.
Enzo Mori & Stephan Clark Remix	7:10	—	Enzo Mori and Stephan Clark	2006	
MHC club Remix	7:31	—	MHC aka Philip Larsen and Chis Smith	2006	
Zloot Remix	4:36	—	Toni Toolz	2006	
Music Video	3:58	—	—	2006	

=== Credits and personnel ===
The credits and the personnel as they appear on the back of the single:

- Moby – lyrics, vocals, instruments, engineering of the original version
- Mylène Farmer – lyrics, vocals
- Manhattan Clique – production
- Brian Sperber – engineering of the original version
- Little Idiot Music / Warner Tamerlane Publishing (BMI) / Requiem Publishing – editions
- Jérôme Devoise – recording of Mylène Farmer's vocals
- Paul Van Parys for Stuffed Monkey – vocal production
- Drew Griffiths at Titanium Studio, London – Mylène Farmer vocal mixing
- TS3 / Thierry Suc – Mylène Farmer management

=== Charts ===
==== Weekly charts ====
Weekly chart performance for "Slipping Away" with Mylène Farmer
Chart (2006)	Peak position
Belgium (Ultratop 50 Wallonia)	1
CIS Airplay (TopHit)	4
France (SNEP)	1
Russia Airplay (TopHit)	2
Switzerland (Schweizer Hitparade)	18

==== Year-end charts ====
2006 year-end chart performance for "Slipping Away" with Mylène Farmer
Chart (2006)	Position
Belgium (Ultratop 50 Wallonia)	22
CIS (TopHit)	43
France (SNEP)	22
Russia Airplay (TopHit)	45

2007 year-end chart performance for "Slipping Away" with Mylène Farmer
Chart (2007)	Position
CIS (TopHit)	64
Russia Airplay (TopHit)	85

=== Decade-end charts ===
Decade-end chart performance for "Slipping Away" with Mylène Farmer
Chart (2000–2009)	Position
Russia Airplay (TopHit)	80

=== Certifications ===
Country	Certification	Date	Sales certified	Physical sales	Digital downloads	Total
France	Gold	2006	200,000	168,000 (152,587 in 2006)	16,032 in 2006	250,000

== Notes ==
- Chuberre, Erwan (2007). L'Intégrale Mylène Farmer (in French). City. ISBN 978-2-35288-108-7.
- Chuberre, Erwan (2008). Mylène Farmer, phénoménale (in French). City. ISBN 978-2-35288-176-6.
- Chuberre, Erwan (June 18, 2009). Mylène Farmer : Des mots sur nos désirs (in French). Alphée. ISBN 978-2-7538-0477-7.
- Royer, Hugues (2008). Mylène, biographie (in French). Spain: Flammarion. ISBN 978-2-35287-139-2.
