= Ooh Yeah (song) =

Single by Moby

from the album Last Night
- Released: November 23, 2008
- Length: 5:18
- Label: Mute
- Songwriter: Moby
- Producer: Moby

Moby singles chronology
"I Love to Move in Here" (2008)	"Ooh Yeah" (2008)	"Shot in the Back of the Head" (2009)

Music video
- "Moby - Ooh Yeah" on YouTube

"Ooh Yeah" is a song by American electronica musician Moby. It was released as the fourth and final single from his eighth studio album Last Night on November 23, 2008, as a digital download.

== Music video ==
Makeup artist applying makeup to Crystal Meth.

The "Ooh Yeah" music video was directed by Matteo Bernardini. It starts out on the set of a pornography video shoot. People are getting ready and rushing around while the director is smoking and the makeup artist is applying makeup to some of the porn stars (whose names are Angelica La Lapin (Angel Rabbit), Crystal Menthe (Crystal Meth), Foxy Candy, and Bunny). Then the movie begins shooting. The pizza boy (whose name is Big Rod) is called by two of the girls. He brings them over pizza and then starts having wild sexual intercourse with them. This continues until the end of the music video.

== Track listing ==
- Digital single
1. "Ooh Yeah" (Jeremy Wheatley Radio Mix) – 3:38
2. "Ooh Yeah" (Kris Menace Remix) – 4:53
3. "Ooh Yeah" (Uncle Buck Remix) – 6:33
4. "Ooh Yeah" (Chopstick Remix) – 7:52
5. "Ooh Yeah" (D. Ramirez Haunted Playground Remix) – 8:16
6. "Ooh Yeah" (Tommie Sunshine's Class of '89 Dub) – 7:28

== Charts ==
Chart (2008–09)	Peak position
US Dance Club Songs (Billboard)	3
