= Two Times Blue =

2007 single by Deborah Harry

Single by Deborah Harry

from the album Necessary Evil
- Released: September 7, 2007
- Genre: Pop rock
- Length: 3:58
- Label: Eleven Seven
- Songwriters: Deborah Harry; Barb Morrison; Charles Nieland
- Producer: Super Buddha

Deborah Harry singles chronology
"New York, New York" (2006)	"Two Times Blue" (2007)	"Fit Right In" (2008)

Audio sample
- Two Times Blue: file; help

"Two Times Blue" is a song by American singer Deborah Harry, released as the lead single from her fifth solo studio album, Necessary Evil (2007). The pop rock song, produced by Super Buddha, finds Harry responding to a critical lover but confessing that she'd be unhappy if she left. It was released as a single in September 2007, and also inspired multiple dance remixes, including a radio edit. The song received generally favorable reviews from critics and reached number five on the Billboard Dance Club Songs chart, becoming Harry's highest-peaking single in 14 years. In retrospect, critics continue to regard the song as a career highlight.

== Composition ==
"Two Times Blue" is a pop rock song with a length of three minutes and fifty-eight seconds. In the verses, Harry responds to a lover who accuses her of being a "two timer" and "Miss Calculation", in turn defending herself and singing that she "can't give up—I love you through and through". The song's chorus, which has been described as catchy and "oddly romantic", consists of the lyrics "Well maybe I could’ve been better/Yeah, maybe I’ve been kind of bad/But I know, oh yes I know/You’ll be two times blue if I go". Musically, the song has been described as having a "guitar-fueled-meets-beatbox template", while Harry's vocals have been called "rough around the edges". The song's radio edit made more extensive use of synthesizers and deemphasize Harry's vocals; it's also longer than the original version, with a length of four minutes and twenty-nine seconds.

== Release ==
On September 7, 2007, "Two Times Blue" was released as the lead single from Necessary Evil, Harry's fifth solo studio album and first solo release in fourteen years.

The single also spawned a number of dance remixes. On September 9, 2007, an extended play of remixes of the song was released via eMusic. A digital single release featured the album version as well as the "Nickel & Dime Mix". In November 2007, Harry released an alternate mix of the song, the Stonebridge Radio Edit, to radio stations. Other remixes were released by Soul Seekerz and Sixx:A.M., a side project of Mötley Crüe member Nikki Sixx.

== Critical reception ==
In a preview of the album for Billboard, Cohen named the song a highlight of Necessary Evil, calling it a "shiny pop-rocker". Critic Rosie Swash, in a single review for The Guardian, was negative in her assessment of the song, predicting that it wouldn't attain the success of other comeback singles like Cher's "Believe" because it is "very boring". Swash did, however, praise Harry for being able to "still hit the high notes". An album review for Slant Magazine, penned by Sal Cinquemani, commended the song as the "epitome of geek-pop, even making algebra sound sexy". Pitchfork deemed the song a "soaring first single".

=== Legacy ===
In a 2011 profile of Harry, New York magazine pointed to the song as evidence of Harry's vocal ability and lyrical focus. In 2015, in honor of Harry's seventieth birthday, Attitude released a list of her ten best songs, and included "Two Times Blue", retrospectively calling it "an A-grade pop song". In January 2021, "Two Times Blue" was highlighted in a "Should Have Been Bigger" column for Idolator, with music journalist Mike Wass naming it one of Harry's "very best" releases and opining that it should have achieved a level of success comparable to that of Cher's "Believe." In 2022, the song was ranked by American Songwriter as one of Harry's 10 best solo songs. AllMusic placed the song in its list of highlights of Harry's solo work.

== Commercial performance ==
Upon its release, the song became an international dance hit. On November 10, 2007, Billboard reported that the song had reached the top 20 of the Club Play chart (since renamed the Dance Club Songs chart), thereby becoming Harry's highest-peaking single on that chart in fourteen years. Ultimately, the song peaked at number five on the Dance Club Songs chart.

== Track listings ==
All tracks (Deborah Harry, Barbara Jean-Morrison and Charles W. Nieland)

- US CD #1 (promo only)
1. "Two Times Blue" (Original Radio Edit) - 3:57
- US CD #2 (promo only)
1. "Two Times Blue" (Original Radio Edit) - 3:57
2. "Two Times Blue" (Nickel & Dime Mix) - 3:25
- US CD #3 (promo only)
1. "Two Times Blue" (Soul Seekerz Club Mix) - 8:23
2. "Two Times Blue" (Hardino Remix) - 7:09
3. "Two Times Blue" (Clubstar Remix) - 5:23
4. "Two Times Blue" (Soul Seekerz Dub) - 8:10
5. "Two Times Blue" (Original Radio Edit) - 3:57
- US CD
1. "Two Times Blue" (Debbie Harry vs Soul Seekerz Vocal) - 8:23
2. "Two Times Blue" (Debbie Harry vs Soul Seekerz Dub) - 8:10
3. "Two Times Blue" (Soul Seekerz Extended Vocal) - 8:22
4. "Two Times Blue" (Soul Seekerz Radio Edit)- 3:43
5. "Two Times Blue" (Debbie Harry Accapella) - 3:34
- US 12-inch and CD
1. "Two Times Blue" (The StoneBridge Vocal) - 8:08
2. "Two Times Blue" (The StoneBridge Dub) - 8:06
3. "Two Times Blue" (The StoneBridge Radio Edit) - 4:29

== Charts ==
Chart performance for "Two Times Blue"
Chart (2007)	Peak position
Global Dance Songs (Billboard)	34
US Dance Club Songs (Billboard)	5
