= The Bourne Ultimatum (soundtrack) =

The Bourne Ultimatum: Original Motion Picture Soundtrack

Soundtrack album by John Powell
- Released: July 31, 2007
- Recorded: Air Lyndhurst Studios
- Genre: Score
- Length: 50:38
- Label: Decca
- Producer: John Powell

John Powell chronology
Happy Meet: Music from the Motion Picture (2006)	The Bourne Ultimatum: Original Motion Picture Soundtrack (2007)	Music from the Motion Picture P.S. I Love You (2007)

Singles from The Bourne Ultimatum: Original Motion Picture Soundtrack
- 1. "Extreme Ways (Bourne's Ultimatum)" Released: July 31, 2007

Professional ratings
Review scores
Source	Rating
Allmusic	3/5 stars
Filmtracks	3/5 stars

The Bourne Ultimatum: Original Motion Picture Soundtrack is the soundtrack to the 2007 film The Bourne Ultimatum.

Composer John Powell returned as the Bourne composer, having created the scores for the two previous films. Also included is a brand-new version of Moby's "Extreme Ways", titled "Extreme Ways (Bourne's Ultimatum)". Unlike the other two albums of the Hollywood Bourne series, the tracks in this album are not chronologically in order the way they are played in the movie.

== Track listing ==
1. "Six Weeks Ago" – (4:31)
2. "Tangiers" – (7:40)
3. "Thinking of Marie" – (3:51)
4. "Assets and Targets" – (7:18)
5. "Faces Without Names" – (3:31)
6. "Waterloo" – (10:38)
7. "Coming Home" – (3:19)
8. "Man Versus Man" – (5:46)
9. "Jason Is Reborn" – (4:04)
10. "Extreme Ways (Bourne's Ultimatum)" by Moby – (4:22)

== Credits ==
- Orchestra Conducted By: Gavin Greenaway
- Orchestrated By: Jake Parker, Gary Thomas and David Butterworth
- Additional Music By: John Ashton Thomas and James McKee Smith
- Mixed By: Shawn Murphy
- Edited By: Thomas A. Carlson, Ramiro Belgardt, Peter Myles and Curt Sobel

== Instrumentation ==
- Strings: 28 violins, 15 violas, 15 violoncellos, 9 double basses
- Woodwinds: 1 bassoon
- Brass: 11 French horns, 3 trombones, 2 bass trombones, 2 contrabass trombones, 3 tubas
- Percussion: 3 players
- 2 pianos, organ & ethnic woodwinds
