= Hotel (album) =

Studio album by Moby
- Released: March 14, 2005
- Recorded: 2004
- Studios: Moby's home studio, Electric Lady Studios, and Loho Studios in New York City
- Genres: Alternative rock; electronica; downtempo; trip hop
- Length: 56:30 (disc one); 67:51 (disc two)
- Labels: Mute; V2
- Producer: Moby

Moby chronology
18 B Sides + DVD (2003)	Hotel (2005)	Go – The Very Best of Moby (2006)

Moby studio albums chronology
18 (2002)	Hotel (2005)	Last Night (2008)

Alternate cover
- Hotel: Ambient 2014 reissue cover

Singles from Hotel
- 1. "Lift Me Up" Released: February 28, 2005; 2. "Raining Again" Released: May 23, 2005; 3. "Spiders" Released: May 30, 2005; 4. "Dream About Me" Released: August 8, 2005; 5. "Beautiful" Released: September 12, 2005; 6. "Slipping Away" Released: January 23, 2006

Hotel is the seventh studio album by American electronica musician, singer, songwriter, and producer Moby. It was released on March 14, 2005, internationally by Mute Records and on March 22, 2005, in the United States by V2 Records. The album marked a stylistic shift from electronic and dance-oriented music towards alternative rock and Moby's decision not to use vocal sampling for the first time since his 1993 album Ambient.

Hotel was met with a mixed critical reception upon release but was a commercial success, reaching No. 28 in the US and No. 8 in the UK. Elsewhere, it reached No. 1 in Belgium and Switzerland. Initial quantities of the album included a second CD of ambient music entitled Hotel: Ambient. By 2013, the album had sold over 2 million copies worldwide. In 2014, Hotel: Ambient was released with additional tracks.

== Background and writing ==
After touring for his previous album, 18 (2002), ended in 2003, Moby took a detour in musical styles and released Baby Monkey, the third album under his Voodoo Child pseudonym, in January 2004. It marked a return to his techno and rave roots, which had brought him success in the early 1990s. At the time of the album's release, Moby revealed that he had around 250 songs of varied styles, including electronic, ambient, and experimental pieces, for his next full studio album, but he was unsure as to what direction it should take. His early desire was to make a disco and dance-oriented album. He abandoned this idea for an album of ballads, and wrote between 30 and 40 songs before he decided that the time was not right for such a direction.

Moby drew a large amount of inspiration for Hotel from his experiences in living in New York City. The music he heard DJs play in local bars, and the bands he saw perform live at various gigs, made him feel "like I was being given license to bask or wallow in my early influences". In a departure from his previous albums Play and 18, the album marks Moby's first since Ambient (1993) which does not include any vocal samples. Though the many songs that he had written did contain them, they did not interest him as much. Moby reasoned this down to the difficulty in learning the sampling function of the audio recording software on his computer, but nonetheless enjoyed writing the songs without relying on them. Moby said the songs on Hotel are more personal and direct than on his previous albums. After selecting tracks to record for the album, Moby began to search for vocalists to sing on them, but he was unsuccessful in finding people with voices he liked. The candidates that showed the most potential lacked an emotional quality in their voice.

In a journal entry on his website, Moby explained the title Hotel, writing that he was fascinated by the nature of hotels, where humans spend often significant portions of their lives, but have all traces of their tenancy removed for the next guests.

=== Moby's opinion in retrospect ===
In recent years, Moby has stated that Hotel is his least favorite of all of the albums he has made. In an interview with Q, Moby said that although the production was "very slick and very professional", he was dissatisfied with the final product once it was done. He explained: "I like some of the songs, but I produced it in such a generic way that I was really kinda disappointed with myself as a producer and as a musician."

In a 2011 interview, Moby recalled that he felt that while making the album, he was more focused on the fame aspect after the unexpected success with Play and wanted to produce an album that had the potential to be commercially successful.

It's the only time in my life I've ever done that. I recorded it in a big studio with a really successful engineer and ended up with a very slick, polished anodyne record that I just don't like very much. Some of the songs are nice but I'm disappointed I made such a conventional generic record.

In his 2019 memoir Then It Fell Apart, Moby recounts his disappointment with the album in chapter 42, writing how at the time he was more concerned with his level of fame and had alienated many of his friends due to his escalating alcoholism and substance abuse:

Back in my suite at the Landmark I put on my headphones and went for a walk up and down the carpeted hallways of the hotel, listening to my new album. In terms of recording, mixing, and engineering, Hotel was impeccable. But during the third song, "Beautiful," I knew that a lot of the bad reviews were right: it was missing something. I'd traded my battered little bedroom studio for expensive rooms filled with the best equipment on the planet, and the result was a compromised album. It had a few moments of beauty, but I didn't love it. I kept listening, and my panic skyrocketed. I realized I'd made a mistake in releasing Hotel. A mistake that had now been shipped around the world for millions of people to experience firsthand. I wanted to buy all of the millions of CDs that had been shipped, bury them in Nevada, and rerecord all the songs on the cheap equipment in my little studio on Mott Street.

== Recording ==
Hotel was recorded in sections in the space of a year and a half. Moby recorded it using ProTools software. Around three-quarters of the album, including the vocals and electronic instrumentation, was recorded at his home studio on Mott Street in Manhattan, New York City. The live drums were put down at Electric Lady Studios, and other tracks, including most of the guitars, were recorded at Loho Studios, both in Manhattan. Moby decided to record in outside studios due to the quality of the recording rooms and the microphones available. The latter housed a large Neve console, assembled from the parts of four to five other Neve models. Mixing was completed at Electric Lady Studios, onto half-inch analogue tape, using a Solid State Logic J-Series desk.

Moby is responsible for playing the instruments on all the album's tracks, except for drums. Laura Dawn provides additional vocals. The guitars used on the album include an acoustic, a Carlo Robelli model that Moby estimated cost $180, and a Les Paul Goldtop.

== Songs ==
Moby wrote "Lift Me Up" as a tribute to the English rock band The Sisters of Mercy. He made an attempt to have their lead vocalist Andrew Eldritch sing it but he was unsuccessful in his search to contact Eldritch. "Spiders" is an homage to David Bowie. He expanded on the song's meaning: "It's inspired by the anthropological seeds of fascism, and how easy it is for intellectuals to turn off the intellect and get lost in the crowd." He clarified that its uplifting chorus is more "quizzical" in how easy it is for one to get "lost in the moment". "Lift Me Up" and "Raining Again" contain additional background vocals by Shayna Steele. The latter is about a relationship that is falling apart, while the world is crumbling around them too. "When You End" is a sad song about a relationship that ends despite his still being in love with the person. "Dream About Me" is another song about being in a flawed, yet loving relationship. "Beautiful" is a love song. "Temptation" is a cover of the song by New Order. Moby declared "Slipping Away" as the most personal song he had written up to this point in his career. "It's not really about anything in particular. It's not about a specific event ... It's just like emotionally descriptive." "Very" is a song that Moby described as his homage to Giorgio Moroder and Donna Summer.

== Release ==
Hotel was released internationally on March 14, 2005; its US release followed on March 22. The lead single was "Lift Me Up", released on February 28, 2005. The second UK single, "Spiders", was released on May 23, 2005, to coincide with Moby's UK tour.

As with Moby's previous albums Play and 18, an accompanying DVD for Hotel was later released, featuring the videos for the album's singles, live footage, and a sequel to Moby's home movie and tour diary series, Give an Idiot a Camcorder.

The bonus disc of Hotel, titled Hotel: Ambient, which consisted of ambient music, was later re-released as a separate release on December 16, 2014. The release contains remastered versions of all songs on the original, together with three extra tracks: "May 4 Two", "Spaired Long", and "Live Forever (Long)".

== Critical reception ==
Professional ratings
Aggregate scores
Source	Rating
Metacritic	47/100
Review scores
Source	Rating
AllMusic	2.5/5 stars
Blender	3/5 stars
Entertainment Weekly	B−
The Guardian	2/5 stars
Los Angeles Times	2.5/4 stars
Mojo	3/5 stars
Pitchfork	2.4/10
Q	3/5 stars
Rolling Stone	3/5 stars
Uncut	2/5 stars

Hotel received generally mixed reviews from critics. At Metacritic, which assigns a normalized rating out of 100 reviews from mainstream critics, the album has an average score of 47, based on 24 reviews, which indicates "mixed or average reviews". Critics gave a lukewarm reaction to the album's first disc, which they felt was mostly "predictable" and "generic", while most of the praise went towards the second disc comprising ambient techno: AllMusic calling it the record's "saving grace" and Entertainment Weekly complimenting its "ethereal" instrumentals. Andy Kellman from AllMusic observed that Hotel shows little inspiration from Moby's previously advertised new wave and post-punk era, while criticizing his decision to hold off from sampling, which he felt led to an album with "all valley and no peaks", but nevertheless praised the "lovely" opening and closing tracks. Not all critics opposed Moby's decision to abstain from sampling; Christian Hoard from Rolling Stone considered the "nostalgic" songs to "transmit singer-songwriter warmth and clarity through textures that effuse autumnal beauty", despite their feeling relatively sparse, and the slower tracks "[vaguing] out". On the other hand, Robert Hilburn of the Los Angeles Times was unimpressed with Moby's "detached, deadpan" vocals, which leave most of the tracks as "surface decorations". He felt that although it sounds more "natural", its essence was instead "less organic and more calculated", thus showing the album's "insistence on being liked". Writing for The Guardian, David Peschek also commented on the record's vocals, feeling that the "cumulative vocal pallor" and "bizarrely cliched ideas" make for a "wan listen".

Eric Henderson from Slant Magazine further compared the record to a chain of hotels, writing: "[Hotel] is one identical room/song after another. Same furnishings, same instrumentation, same emotionless façade." Nick Cowen of Drowned in Sound felt similarly about the album's "bland and instantly forgettable" tone, while disapproving of the "unbelievably bad" cover of "Temptation", which he wrote was too "stripped down" and slow. Pitchfork's Rob Mitchum was most critical of Hotel, pointing out that the record "strikes the same mood of one-way-street sloganeering" consisting of "simple, familiar, and recycled" imagery, which dropped Moby to a "blank manufacturer of rock-by-numbers", devoid of his previously distinguishing characteristics.

However, Entertainment Weekly's Doug Brog was more positive towards the album, commending Moby's "appealing cheekiness" among the songs, especially with the "big-chorus soft rock" of "Slipping Away". Andy Battaglia from The A.V. Club agreed that Hotel still "holds out a few touching glimmers", with songs like "Slipping Away", which is carried by a "robust melodic hook", coupled with the "sexy, mysterious production and breathy vocals" on "I Like It".

== Track listing ==
All tracks are written by Moby, except where noted.

Disc one: Hotel
No.	Title	Writer(s)	Length
1.	"Hotel Intro"		1:54
2.	"Raining Again"		3:43
3.	"Beautiful"		3:10
4.	"Lift Me Up"		3:14
5.	"Where You End"	Moby; Dimitri Ehrlich	3:18
6.	"Temptation"	Bernard Sumner; Gillian Gilbert; Peter Hook; Stephen Morris	4:52
7.	"Spiders"		3:42
8.	"Dream About Me"		3:19
9.	"Very"		3:39
10.	"I Like It"		3:42
11.	"Love Should"		3:47
12.	"Slipping Away"		3:37
13.	"Forever"		3:34
14.	"Homeward Angel" (includes hidden track (Note: On the compact disc release, "Homeward Angel" ends with a hidden track titled "35 Minutes".))		5:37
Total length:			56:30

Note

Japanese edition bonus tracks
No.	Title	Length
16.	"Put the Headphones On"	3:49
17.	"Lift Me Up" (video)	3:19
Total length:		63:38

Disc two: Hotel: Ambient (all versions excluding iTunes)
No.	Title	Length
1.	"Swear"	6:41
2.	"Snowball"	4:25
3.	"Blue Paper"	6:07
4.	"Homeward Angel" (long)	10:57
5.	"Chord Sounds"	7:25
6.	"Not Sensitive"	3:10
7.	"Lilly"	3:53
8.	"The Come Down"	5:18
9.	"Overland"	6:49
10.	"Live Forever"	7:15
11.	"Aerial"	5:51
Total length:		67:51

Hotel: Ambient 2014 reissue
No.	Title	Length
1.	"Swear"	6:41
2.	"Snowball"	4:25
3.	"Blue Paper"	6:07
4.	"Homeward Angel" (long)	10:57
5.	"Chord Sounds"	7:25
6.	"Not Sensitive"	3:10
7.	"Lilly"	3:53
8.	"May 4 Two"	8:10
9.	"The Come Down"	5:18
10.	"Overland"	6:49
11.	"Live Forever"	7:15
12.	"Aerial"	5:51
13.	"Spaired Long"	7:51
14.	"Live Forever" (long)	15:40
Total length:		99:32

== Personnel ==
Credits for Hotel adapted from album liner notes.

- Moby – engineering, mixing, production, writing, instruments, vocals
- Jason Candler – vocals
- Laura Dawn – vocals
- Scott Frassetto – drums
- Orion Simprini – vocals
- Brian Sperber – mixing, vocals
- Shayna Steele – vocals
- Kurt Uenala – vocals

== Charts ==
=== Weekly charts ===
Weekly chart performance for Hotel
Chart (2005)	Peak position
Argentine Albums (CAPIF)	1
Australian Albums (ARIA)	10
Austrian Albums (Ö3 Austria)	2
Belgian Albums (Ultratop Flanders)	1
Belgian Albums (Ultratop Wallonia)	2
Danish Albums (Hitlisten)	7
Dutch Albums (Album Top 100)	2
European Albums (Billboard)	1
Finnish Albums (Suomen virallinen lista)	12
French Albums (SNEP)	2
German Albums (Offizielle Top 100)	3
Hungarian Albums (MAHASZ)	30
Irish Albums (IRMA)	6
Italian Albums (FIMI)	3
Mexican Albums (Top 100 Mexico)	6
New Zealand Albums (RMNZ)	10
Norwegian Albums (VG-lista)	18
Portuguese Albums (AFP)	4
Scottish Albums (Official Charts)	7
Spanish Albums (Promusicae)	13
Swedish Albums (Sverigetopplistan)	11
Swiss Albums (Schweizer Hitparade)	1
UK Albums (Official Charts)	8
US Billboard 200	28
US Top Dance Albums (Billboard)	1

=== Year-end charts ===
Year-end chart performance for Hotel
Chart (2005)	Position
Austrian Albums (Ö3 Austria)	75
Belgian Albums (Ultratop Flanders)	4
Belgian Albums (Ultratop Wallonia)	15
Dutch Albums (Album Top 100)	69
European Albums (Billboard)	22
French Albums (SNEP)	16
German Albums (Offizielle Top 100)	44
Italian Albums (FIMI)	62
Mexican Albums (Top 100 Mexico)	26
Swiss Albums (Schweizer Hitparade)	28
US Top Dance/Electronic Albums (Billboard)	3

== Certifications and sales ==
Certifications and sales for Hotel
Region	Certification	Certified units/sales
Argentina (CAPIF)	Gold	20,000^{^}
Austria (IFPI Austria)	Gold	15,000^{*}
Belgium (BRMA)	Gold	25,000^{*}
France (SNEP)	Platinum	300,000^{*}
Germany (BVMI)	Gold	100,000^{^}
Greece (IFPI Greece)	Gold	10,000^{^}
Ireland (IRMA)	Gold	7,500^{^}
Poland (ZPAV)	Gold	20,000^{*}
Portugal (AFP)	Platinum	40,000^{^}
Russia (NFPF)	Gold	10,000^{*}
United Kingdom (BPI)	Gold	100,411
Summaries
Worldwide	—	2,000,000
^{*} Sales figures based on certification alone.^{^} Shipments figures based on certification alone.
