= Alice (Moby song) =

Single by Moby

from the album Last Night
- Released: 10 March 2008
- Genre: Alternative hip hop
- Length: 4:27 (album version); 3:34 (single version)
- Label: Mute
- Songwriter(s): Moby; Segun Olakunle Adegunwa; Ainsley Robert Jones; Harry Olufemi Williams
- Producer(s): Moby

Moby singles chronology
"Disco Lies" (2008)	"Alice" (2008)	"I Love to Move in Here" (2008)

Music video
- "Moby - Alice" on YouTube

"Alice" is a song by the American electronica musician Moby. It was released as the second single from his eighth studio album, Last Night, on 10 March 2008. It features guest vocals from the British MC Aynzli Jones and members of the Nigerian group 419 Squad.

The music video was directed by Andreas Nilsson and is a collage of footage interspersed with Jones' head performing the song, along with clips of explosions and scientific experiments, and scenes of violence and discrimination from classic B-movies; one such scene is from the film Blood Tide which has James Earl Jones punching a watermelon in time to the music.

== Track listing ==
- CD single (CDMUTE380)
1. "Alice" (radio edit) – 3:36
2. "Alice" (Drop the Lime–Heavy Bass Remix) – 5:03
3. "Alice" (Noisia Remix) – 5:10
4. "Alice" (General Midi Remix) – 6:19
- 12-inch single (12MUTE380)
1. "Alice" (Drop the Lime–Heavy Bass Remix) – 5:03
2. "Alice" – 4:27
3. "Alice" (General Midi Remix) – 6:20
4. "Alice" (acapella) – 4:01
- Digital single
1. "Alice" (radio edit) – 3:33
- Digital EP
1. "Alice" (radio edit) – 3:36
2. "Alice" (Drop the Lime–Heavy Bass Remix) – 5:03
3. "Alice" (Noisia Remix) – 5:10
4. "Alice" (General Midi Remix) – 6:20
5. "Alice" (acapella) – 4:01

== Charts ==
Chart (2008)	Peak position
Canada (Canadian Hot 100)	92
CIS Airplay (TopHit)	141
