= Disco Lies =

Single by Moby

from the album Last Night
- B-side: "Clef"
- Released: January 21, 2008
- Length: 3:23
- Label: Mute
- Songwriter: Moby
- Producer: Moby

Moby singles chronology
"Extreme Ways (Bourne's Ultimatum)" (2007)	"Disco Lies" (2008)	"Alice" (2008)

Music video
- "Moby - Disco Lies" on YouTube

"Disco Lies" is a song by American electronica musician Moby. It was released as the first single from his eighth studio album Last Night on January 21, 2008. The female vocals are provided by Shayna Steele.

== Release ==
"Disco Lies" was released as a single onto the US iTunes Store market on January 21, 2008. It was released in Europe as the first single from Last Night, and well as the United Kingdom as a remix version by Freemasons.

The single also features the track "Clef", in which the vocals are an unknown woman counting in German.

== Music video ==
The music video for the song was directed by Evan Bernard and premiered on February 14, 2008. The video follows the story of a baby chick who at a young age escapes from a chicken farm, witnessing the slaughtering of his friends and kin. The video then shows ten years later (acclimated at the late 1970s) when the chicken has grown up and is out for vengeance for the killing of his friends. Dressed as a pimp, the chicken enters into an "MFC" fast food restaurant (a reference to KFC) and seeks out the owner of the franchise (played by Moby), a man dressed in white with a beard and cowboy hat (a clear reference to KFC's Colonel Sanders). After disposing of the owner's two bodyguards, the chicken chases the owner until he eventually corners him in the slaughterhouse where his friends were killed and beheads the owner with the same knife used to kill his kin. The video is likely the product of Moby's veganism and strong animal rights activism, as it makes a strong statement against the meat industry.

There are two versions of the video, one censored and the other uncensored. Firstly, the chicken slaughter scene is cut in the censored version. Secondly, in the scene where the chicken finally kills the Colonel, his death is indicated by the blood splattering over the MFC's poster in the uncensored version. The censored version just shows the poster. Finally, at the last scene, the colonel's leg meat is on the dish is shown in the uncensored, whilst the colonel's hand meat in the bucket (as if it was part of the fried chicken) is shown for the censored video.

== Track listing ==
- CD single (CDMUTE387)
1. "Disco Lies" – 3:23
2. "Clef" – 3:34
- CD single (LCDMUTE387)
1. "Disco Lies" – 3:23
2. "Clef" – 3:34
3. "Disco Lies" (Spencer and Hill Remix) – 6:14
4. "Disco Lies" (Eddie Thoneick Dynamik Dub!) – 6:36
5. "Disco Lies" (Diskokaine Fried Chicken Remix) – 5:59
6. "Disco Lies" (Jacques Renault Remix) – 6:34
7. "Disco Lies" (The Dusty Kid's Fears Remix) – 9:04
8. "Disco Lies" (video – censored version) – 3:26
- Digital single
1. "Disco Lies" – 3:22
2. "Clef" – 3:34
3. "Disco Lies" (Spencer and Hill Remix) – 6:14
4. "Disco Lies" (Eddie Thoneick Dynamik Dub!) – 6:36
5. "Disco Lies" (Diskokaine Fried Chicken Remix) – 5:59
6. "Disco Lies" (Jacques Renault Remix) – 6:34
7. "Disco Lies" (The Dusty Kid's Fears Remix) – 9:04
- Digital single
1. "Disco Lies" (Spencer and Hill Remix) – 6:13
2. "Disco Lies" (Eddie Thoneick Vocal Mix!) – 7:05
3. "Disco Lies" (Eddie Thoneick Dynamik Dub!) – 6:34
4. "Disco Lies" (Jacques Renault Remix) – 6:34
5. "Disco Lies" (Spencer and Hill Remix radio edit) – 3:34
6. "Disco Lies" (Diskokaine Lied Remix) – 7:16
7. "Disco Lies" (Diskokaine Old-Rave Remix) – 5:54
8. "Disco Lies" (Diskokaine Fried Chicken Remix) – 5:58
9. "Disco Lies" (The Dusty Kid's Fears Remix) – 9:04
- CD single (CDMUTE407)
1. "Disco Lies" (Freemasons Club Edit) – 3:31
2. "Disco Lies" (Spencer and Hill Remix radio edit) – 3:34
- 12-inch single (12MUTE407)
1. "Disco Lies" (Freemasons Club Mix) – 9:04
2. "Disco Lies" (Eddie Thoneick Dynamik Dub!) – 6:34
3. "Disco Lies" (Spencer and Hill Remix) – 6:13
4. "Disco Lies" (The Dusty Kid's Fears Remix) – 9:04
- Digital single – remixes
1. "Disco Lies" (Freemasons Club Mix) – 9:04
2. "Disco Lies" (Eddie Thoneick Vocal Mix!) – 7:05
3. "Disco Lies" (Diskokaine Lied Remix) – 7:16
4. "Disco Lies" (The Dusty Kid's Fears Remix) – 9:04

== Charts ==
=== Weekly charts ===
Weekly chart performance for "Disco Lies"
Chart (2008–09)	Peak position
Austria (Ö3 Austria Top 40)	21
Belgium (Ultratop 50 Flanders)	4
Belgium (Ultratop 50 Wallonia)	12
Belgium Dance (Ultratop)	10
Canada Hot 100 (Billboard)	46
CIS Airplay (TopHit)	60
Germany (GfK)	8
Hungary (Editors' Choice Top 40)	20
Italy (FIMI)	14
Netherlands (Single Top 100)	67
Netherlands (Tipparade)	5
Romania (Romanian Top 100)	16
Sweden (Sverigetopplistan)	53
Switzerland (Schweizer Hitparade)	10
UK Singles (Official Charts Company)	140
UK Dance (OCC)	2
US Dance Club Songs (Billboard)	1
US Dance/Mix Show Airplay (Billboard)	10

=== Year-end charts ===
Year-end chart performance for "Disco Lies"
Chart (2008)	Position
Belgium (Ultratop Flanders)	14
Belgium (Ultratop Wallonia)	64
Germany (Official German Charts)	60
US Dance Club Songs (Billboard)	28
