= 18 (Moby album) =

Studio album by Moby
- Released: May 13, 2002
- Recorded: 2000–2002
- Studios: Moby's home studio on Mott Street, Manhattan, New York City
- Genres: Downtempo; electronica; alternative pop
- Length: 71:24
- Labels: Mute; V2
- Producer: Moby

Moby chronology
Play: The B Sides (2000)	18 (2002)	18 B Sides + DVD (2003)

Singles from 18
- 1. "We Are All Made of Stars" Released: April 1, 2002; 2. "Extreme Ways" Released: June 24, 2002; 3. "In This World" Released: November 4, 2002; 4. "Sunday (The Day Before My Birthday)" Released: February 24, 2003; 5. "In My Heart" Released: 2003; 6. "Jam for the Ladies" Released: July 21, 2003

18 is the sixth studio album by American electronica musician, songwriter, and producer Moby. It was released on May 13, 2002, by Mute Records in the UK and on May 14, 2002, by V2 Records in the US. After the unexpected commercial and critical success of his previous album, Play (1999), Moby started to write songs for a follow-up during its supporting tour. He started work on the album at its conclusion in December 2000, using fewer samples than before. Guest vocalists include Azure Ray, MC Lyte, Angie Stone, and Sinéad O'Connor.

Following its release, 18 went to number one in 12 countries, including the UK, and reached number 4 in the US. The album went on to sell over 4 million copies worldwide. 18 B Sides + DVD, a collection of the album's B-sides and live video footage, was released a year later.

== Background ==
In December 2000, Moby finished his world tour in support of his previous studio album, Play (1999), which had lasted for 21 consecutive months. He wanted to start on a follow-up as soon as it was over, by which time he had already recorded ideas for some new songs. This process was under way in the spring of 2001, with Moby using a Power Macintosh G3 and G4 to write and record with Pro Tools. He felt no pressure in delivering an album that matched the commercial success of Play, but an "artistic pressure" to make a record that he and others could enjoy.

Prior to starting on 18, Moby had friends in New York City, Los Angeles, and London search through local record shops for albums that contained strong vocals that he could use to sample from and write songs based on them, a technique he had used for Play. He received several hundred and from them, clipped vocal lines, often two or three words long, that caught his interest. From there, he played different chords on his piano that suited the part to build an outline for a song. He then stored the records in his cabinets. Moby composed the album in batches, transferring songs onto a CD and sending them to his management and the A&R representative at V2 with labels such as "Moby Ideas 2, August 2001" or "Moby Demos 3". After 10 months Moby had sent 35 discs comprising over 140 songs, which promoted ideas of making 18 a triple album, but his friends and management advised against it. There were arguments between Moby and V2 over the use of vocal samples on 18, and V2 and Mute believed that a follow-up album that sounded like Play was going to attract criticism.

Moby named the album after the number of tracks that he put on it, and his fondness towards the idea of the title being easily translated and known as something different in other countries. He pointed out that there are some "really esoteric reasons" for the title, but did not mention them. On his website, Moby hinted that those who had visited Israel and are familiar with conspiracy theories regarding extraterrestrials may spot its significance. He said that Play and 18 were structured around the same motivation: "The desire to make compassionate records that meet a need in someone else's life."

By the time of the September 11 attacks in New York City, the album was almost recorded and finished. Following the incident, Moby made alterations to "Sleep Alone" as he found some of its lyrics "too prescient"; the line "Pieces of fire touch your hair" became "Pieces of light". Moby had written "Harbour" in 1984, at nineteen years of age; Sinéad O'Connor was surprised upon learning this, as she initially thought the song related to pre- and post-September 11 events. O'Connor was too afraid to fly to New York City to record her vocals at the time, so she used a studio in London.

Prior to the album's release, V2 Records avoided to send advance copies to soundtrack supervisors. As Play had gained momentum after it was licensed to television and film productions, the label did not rule out the possibility of licensing tracks from 18 but wanted to hold out from doing so until the official launch.

== Critical reception ==
Professional ratings
Aggregate scores
Source	Rating
Metacritic	61/100
Review scores
Source	Rating
AllMusic	4/5 stars
Blender	4/5 stars
Entertainment Weekly	A−
The Guardian	4/5 stars
NME	4/10
Pitchfork	2.6/10
Q	4/5 stars
Rolling Stone	3.5/5 stars
Uncut	2/5 stars
USA Today	3/4 stars

18 received generally positive reviews from critics. At Metacritic, which assigns a normalized rating to reviews from mainstream critics, the album has a weighted average score of 61 out of 100 based on 21 reviews, indicating "generally favorable reviews". Stephen Thomas Erlewine of AllMusic gave the album four stars out of five, writing that, "Moby not only creates a shimmering, reflective mood from the outset, but [that] he sustains it throughout the 18 songs, as the album shifts from pop and soul songs to soaring instrumental stretches letting the sound deepen and change colors with each new track."

== Track listing ==
All tracks are written by Moby, except where noted.

18 track listing
No.	Title	Writer(s)	Length
1.	"We Are All Made of Stars"		4:32
2.	"In This World"		4:02
3.	"In My Heart"		4:36
4.	"Great Escape"	Moby; Maria Taylor; Orenda Fink	2:09
5.	"Signs of Love"		4:25
6.	"One of These Mornings"		3:12
7.	"Another Woman"	Moby; Barbara Lynn Ozen	3:56
8.	"Fireworks"		2:13
9.	"Extreme Ways"		3:57
10.	"Jam for the Ladies"	Moby; Lana Michele Moorer; Angela Stone; Michael McDermon	3:22
11.	"Sunday (The Day Before My Birthday)"	Moby; Sylvia Robinson	5:09
12.	"18"		4:28
13.	"Sleep Alone"		4:45
14.	"At Least We Tried"		4:08
15.	"Harbour"		6:26
16.	"Look Back In"		2:20
17.	"The Rafters"		3:22
18.	"I'm Not Worried at All"		4:11
Total length:			71:24

Japanese edition bonus 3" CD (V2CP 123-124)
No.	Title	Length
1.	"We Are All Made of Stars" (Cornelius Remix)	5:58
2.	"Soul to Love"	4:30
3.	"We Are All Made of Stars – Slow Synth"	7:00
Total length:		17:28

Sample credits

- "Another Woman" contains samples of "I'm a Good Woman", written and performed by Barbara Lynn.
- "Jam for the Ladies" contains samples of "Wherever You Are", written and performed by Mic Geronimo.
- "Sunday (The Day Before My Birthday)" contains samples of "Sunday", written and performed by Sylvia Robinson.

== Personnel ==
Credits are adapted from album liner notes.

Music

- Moby – instruments, vocals on "We Are All Made of Stars", "Signs of Love", "Extreme Ways" and "Sleep Alone"
- Azure Ray – vocals on "Great Escape"
- Freedom Bremner – vocals on "At Least We Tried"
- MC Lyte – vocals on "Jam for the Ladies"
- Dianne McCaulley – vocals on "One of These Mornings"
- Sinéad O'Connor – vocals on "Harbour"
- Shauna Phillips – vocals on "The Rafters"
- Lorraine Phillips – vocals on "The Rafters"
- Jennifer Price – vocals on "In This World"
- The Shining Light Gospel Choir – vocals on "In My Heart" and "I'm Not Worried at All"
- Angie Stone – vocals on "Jam for the Ladies"

Production

- Moby – production, engineering, mixing
- Tony Dawsey – mastering
- David Calderley – artwork, design
- Danny Clinch – photography

== Charts ==
=== Weekly charts ===
Weekly chart performance for 18
Chart (2002–2005)	Peak position
Australian Albums (ARIA)	1
Australian Dance Albums (ARIA)	1
Austrian Albums (Ö3 Austria)	1
Belgian Albums (Ultratop Flanders)	1
Belgian Albums (Ultratop Wallonia)	2
Canadian Albums (Billboard)	1
Danish Albums (Hitlisten)	1
Dutch Albums (Album Top 100)	2
European Albums (Music & Media)	1
Finnish Albums (Suomen virallinen lista)	5
French Albums (SNEP)	1
German Albums (Offizielle Top 100)	1
Irish Albums (IRMA)	1
Italian Albums (FIMI)	2
New Zealand Albums (RMNZ)	1
Norwegian Albums (VG-lista)	2
Portuguese Albums (AFP)	4
Russian Albums (NFPF)	10
Scottish Albums (Official Charts)	1
Spanish Albums (PROMUSICAE)	15
Swedish Albums (Sverigetopplistan)	3
Swiss Albums (Schweizer Hitparade)	1
UK Albums (Official Charts)	1
UK Independent Albums (Official Charts)	1
US Billboard 200	4
US Top Dance Albums (Billboard)	1

=== Year-end charts ===
2002 year-end chart performance for 18
Chart (2002)	Position
Australian Albums (ARIA)	41
Australian Dance Albums (ARIA)	4
Austrian Albums (Ö3 Austria)	53
Belgian Albums (Ultratop Flanders)	8
Belgian Albums (Ultratop Wallonia)	10
Canadian Albums (Nielsen SoundScan)	66
Canadian Alternative Albums (Nielsen SoundScan)	19
Dutch Albums (Album Top 100)	39
European Albums (Music & Media)	13
French Albums (SNEP)	17
German Albums (Offizielle Top 100)	35
New Zealand Albums (RMNZ)	31
Swedish Albums (Sverigetopplistan)	94
Swiss Albums (Schweizer Hitparade)	15
UK Albums (OCC)	41
US Billboard 200	160
US Top Dance/Electronic Albums (Billboard)	1

2003 year-end chart performance for 18
Chart (2003)	Position
Australian Dance Albums (ARIA)	24
Belgian Albums (Ultratop Flanders)	61
Belgian Albums (Ultratop Wallonia)	90
Dutch Albums (Album Top 100)	96
French Albums (SNEP)	120
US Top Dance/Electronic Albums (Billboard)	23

=== Decade-end charts ===
Decade-end chart performance for 18
Chart (2000–2009)	Position
US Dance/Electronic Albums (Billboard)	5

== Certifications ==
Certifications for 18
Region	Certification	Certified units/sales
Australia (ARIA)	Platinum	70,000^{^}
Belgium (BRMA)	Platinum	50,000^{*}
France (SNEP)	Platinum	300,000^{*}
Germany (BVMI)	Gold	150,000^{^}
Netherlands (NVPI)	Gold	40,000^{^}
New Zealand (RMNZ)	Platinum	15,000^{^}
Portugal (AFP)	Platinum	50,000
Switzerland (IFPI Switzerland)	Platinum	40,000^{^}
United Kingdom (BPI)	Platinum	518,828
United States (RIAA)	Gold	513,000
Summaries
Worldwide	—	4,000,000
^{*} Sales figures based on certification alone.^{^} Shipments figures based on certification alone.
