= Shayna Steele =

American singer, songwriter, and stage actress (born 1975)

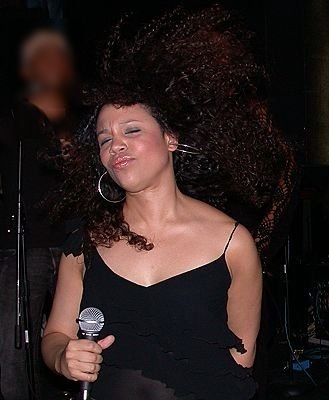
- Shayna performing in 2012

Background information
- Also known as: Shayna Steele; Shayna Cook
- Born: Shayna Donnell Steele; September 23, 1975 (age 51); Sacramento, California, US
- Genres: Soul; blues; jazz
- Occupations: Singer; songwriter; stage actress
- Instrument: Vocals
- Years active: 1998–present
- Label: Highyella Lowbrown Music
- Website: shaynasteele.com

Shayna Steele (born September 23, 1975) is an American singer, songwriter, and Broadway stage actress.

== Career ==
Steele's Broadway credits include Rent at the Nederlander Theatre, the revival of Jesus Christ Superstar at the Foxwoods Theatre (formerly the Ford Center for the Performing Arts), and the original Broadway cast of Hairspray, in which she played a member of the girl group The Dynamites. She went on to appear in Hairspray Live!, broadcast on December 7, 2016.

Steele sings background vocals for Bette Midler in "The Showgirl Must Go On" in Las Vegas. She has also performed on several albums, including Moby's Hotel, and Moby's single "Disco Lies", which reached No. 1 on Billboard's Hot Dance Club Play list. In 2004, Steele released her first self-titled EP and in 2009 released her first album, I'll Be Anything. In 2011, Steele was hired to sing background vocals for Rihanna on her Australian tour of Last Girl on Earth. She toured again with Rihanna on her North American and European "LOUD" tour starting on June 4, 2011, in Baltimore, Maryland, as a background vocalist.
