= Spiders (Moby song) =

Single by Moby

from the album Hotel
- B-side: "It's OK"; "Put the Headphones On"; "Temptation"; "Raining Again (Ewan Pearson Vocal)"
- Released: May 30, 2005
- Length: 3:42 (album version); 3:40 (single version)
- Label: Mute
- Songwriter: Moby
- Producer: Moby

Moby singles chronology
"Raining Again" (2005)	"Spiders" (2005)	"Dream About Me" (2005)

Music video
- "Moby 'Spiders' - Official video" on YouTube

"Spiders" is a song by American electronica musician Moby. It was released as the third single from his seventh studio album Hotel on May 30, 2005 in the United Kingdom. It served as the second single from the album in the United Kingdom, where it was released in place of "Raining Again".

"Spiders" is inspired by Moby's admiration for David Bowie. As such, it could be a reference to the Spiders from Mars, Bowie's touring band during the Ziggy Stardust era.

== Track listing ==
- CD single (CDMUTE350)
1. "Spiders" (edit) – 3:40
2. "It's OK" – 3:51
- CD single (LCDMUTE350)
1. "Spiders" (album version) – 3:46
2. "Put the Headphones On" – 3:50
3. "Raining Again" (Ewan Pearson Vocal Mix) – 7:09
- Limited edition 7-inch single (MUTE350)
1. "Spiders" – 3:42
2. "Temptation" – 4:52

== Charts ==
Chart performance for "Spiders"
Chart (2005)	Peak position
Scottish Singles Sales (Official Charts)	33
UK Singles (Official Charts)	50
