= We Are All Made of Stars =

2002 single by Moby

Single by Moby

from the album 18
- B-side: "Landing"; "Soul to Love"
- Released: April 1, 2002
- Length: 4:32 (album version); 3:38 (single version)
- Label: V2
- Songwriter: Moby
- Producer: Moby

Moby singles chronology
"Find My Baby" (2000)	"We Are All Made of Stars" (2002)	"Extreme Ways" (2002)

Audio sample
- file; help

Music video
- "We Are All Made of Stars" on YouTube

"We Are All Made of Stars" is a song by American electronica musician Moby. It was released as the first single from his sixth studio album, 18 (2002), on April 1, 2002. It reached number 11 on the UK Singles Chart and became a top-10 hit in several other European countries.

== Background ==
"We Are All Made of Stars" was written by Moby in New York after the September 11 attacks to express a sense of hopefulness. Moby has stated that the song was inspired by the song "Flowers" from the album Today by American alternative rock band Galaxie 500, as well as quantum physics in that "On a basic quantum level, all the matter in the universe is essentially made up of stardust." He disclosed the reason behind choosing the song as the lead single from the album:

The reason is very simple. I know how a lot of people choose work songs, with record label bosses in meetings with a lot of people. But as I have creative control, at the end of the day I make these decisions. And I chose this song because every time I listen to this song, it makes me smile. I made the song, I've heard it a million times, but every time the chorus comes, it makes me smile. So there's no marketing reason behind this, it was just my decision.

== Music video ==
The song's music video, directed by Joseph Kahn, edited by David Blackburn and photographed by Brad Rushing, points out the excesses of the typical "Hollywood" lifestyle, showing celebrities in seedy environments, while Moby, an outsider to that world, portrays a spaceman. Celebrities who make appearances in the video include Kato Kaelin, Verne Troyer, Corey Feldman, Todd Bridges, Gary Coleman, JC Chasez, Dave Navarro, Sean Bean, Dominique Swain, Ron Jeremy, Thora Birch, Tommy Lee, Molly Sims, Ritchie Blackmore, Angelyne, The Toxic Avenger, Leelee Sobieski, Sgt. Kabukiman N.Y.P.D., and Robert Evans. The atmosphere of the video was inspired by photographs by Philip-Lorca diCorcia. The theme and some of the imagery also derives from the 1968 film and novel 2001: A Space Odyssey, particularly the Star Child motif ("We are all stars") and Moby's appearance throughout much of the video wearing a space suit.

The video won the MTV Video Music Award for Best Cinematography at the 2002 MTV Video Music Awards.

== Track listings ==
- US 2×12-inch single

A1. "We Are All Made of Stars" (Timo Maas vocal remix) – 7:03
A2. "We Are All Made of Stars" (Bob Sinclar main vocal mix) – 5:28
B1. "We Are All Made of Stars" (DJ Tiësto dub remix) – 8:06
B2. "We Are All Made of Stars" (downtempo remix – edit) – 3:31
C1. "We Are All Made of Stars" (DJ Tiësto full vocal remix) – 7:56
D1. "We Are All Made of Stars" (Forward mix) – 6:30
D2. "We Are All Made of Stars" (Timo Maas dub remix – edit) – 6:25

- UK and Australian CD1 (CDMUTE268)
1. "We Are All Made of Stars"
2. "Landing"
3. "Soul to Love"
- UK and Australian CD2
1. "We Are All Made of Stars" (downtempo)
2. "We Are All Made of Stars" (DJ Tiësto's full vocal remix)
3. "We Are All Made of Stars" (Timo Maas dub mix)
- UK 12-inch single

A1. "We Are All Made of Stars" (Timo Maas dub mix)
B1. "We Are All Made of Stars" (Bob Sinclar main vocal mix)
B2. "We Are All Made of Stars" (DJ Tiësto's edited dub)

- UK cassette single
1. "We Are All Made of Stars"
2. "Landing"
3. "We Are All Made of Stars" (DJ Tiësto's full vocal remix – radio edit)
- European CD single
1. "We Are All Made of Stars"
2. "Landing"
- Japanese CD single
1. "We Are All Made of Stars" (single edit)
2. "Landing"
3. "We Are All Made of Stars" (DJ Tiësto's full vocal remix)

== Charts ==
Chart (2002)	Peak position
Australia (ARIA)	23
Austria (Ö3 Austria Top 40)	50
Belgium (Ultratip Bubbling Under Flanders)	4
Belgium (Ultratip Bubbling Under Wallonia)	2
Canada (Nielsen BDS)	20
Denmark (Tracklisten)	14
Europe (Eurochart Hot 100)	18
France (SNEP)	40
Germany (GfK)	60
Greece (IFPI)	5
Hungary (Mahasz)	3
Ireland (IRMA)	20
Italy (FIMI)	4
Netherlands (Dutch Top 40 Tipparade)	3
Netherlands (Single Top 100)	54
New Zealand (Recorded Music NZ)	37
Norway (VG-lista)	13
Portugal (AFP)	5
Romania (Romanian Top 100)	80
Scotland Singles (OCC)	9
Spain (PROMUSICAE)	2
Sweden (Sverigetopplistan)	45
Switzerland (Schweizer Hitparade)	17
UK Singles (OCC)	11
UK Indie (OCC)	2
US Adult Alternative Airplay (Billboard)	9
US Adult Pop Airplay (Billboard)	32
US Alternative Airplay (Billboard)	22
US Dance Club Songs (Billboard) DJ Tiësto, Timo Maas, and Bob Sinclair mixes	13

== Release history ==
Region	Date	Format(s)	Label(s)	Ref(s).
United States	April 1, 2002	Alternative; triple A radio	V2	
Japan	April 24, 2002	CD	Mute	
Australia	April 29, 2002	CD	Virgin; Mute	
United Kingdom	April 29, 2002	CD; cassette	Mute	
United Kingdom	May 13, 2002	12-inch vinyl	Mute	
United States	May 13, 2002	Contemporary hit; hot adult contemporary radio	V2	
