= Beautiful (Moby song) =

Single by Moby

from the album Hotel
- Released: September 12, 2005
- Length: 3:10
- Label: Mute
- Songwriter: Moby
- Producer: Moby

Moby singles chronology
"Dream About Me" (2005)	"Beautiful" (2005)	"Slipping Away" (2006)

"Beautiful" is a song by American electronica musician Moby. It was released as the fifth single from his seventh studio album Hotel exclusively in mainland Europe on September 12, 2005. Its music video revolves around a swinger party featuring patrons in animal costumes.

The song was later used in the soundtrack of David Frankel's movie The Devil Wears Prada (2006).

== Track listing ==
- CD single (CDMUTE360)
1. "Beautiful" – 3:10
2. "Beautiful" (F*** Me I'm Famous Remix by David Guetta & Joachim Garraud) – 6:43
3. "Beautiful" (Benny Benassi Remix) – 7:03
4. "Beautiful" (Sharam Jey Remix) – 7:11
5. "Beautiful" (Laurent Konrad Remix) – 7:14
- 12-inch single (12MUTE360)
1. "Beautiful" (Benny Benassi Remix) – 7:03
2. "Beautiful" (Laurent Konrad Remix) – 7:14
3. "Beautiful" (Benny Benassi Dub) – 6:40
- 12-inch single (L12MUTE360)
1. "Beautiful" (Sharam Jey Remix) – 7:11
2. "Beautiful" (F*** Me I'm Famous Remix by David Guetta & Joachim Garraud) – 6:43
3. "Beautiful" (Sharam Jey Dub) – 7:13
- Digital single
1. "Beautiful" (Benny Benassi Remix) – 7:03
2. "Beautiful" (Laurent Konrad Remix) – 7:14
3. "Beautiful" (Benny Benassi Dub) – 6:40
4. "Beautiful" (Sharam Jey Remix) – 7:11
5. "Beautiful" (F*** Me I'm Famous Remix by David Guetta & Joachim Garraud) – 6:43
6. "Beautiful" (Sharam Jey Dub) – 7:13

== Charts ==
Chart (2005)	Peak position
Belgium (Ultratip Bubbling Under Flanders)	16
France (SNEP)	63
Germany (GfK)	90
Spain (Promusicae)	11
US Adult Alternative Airplay (Billboard)	5
