= Jam for the Ladies =

2003 single by Moby

Single by Moby vs. Princess Superstar

from the album 18
- B-side: "Bed"; "Ace Love"
- Released: July 21, 2003
- Length: 3:22 (album version); 3:05 (single version)
- Label: Mute
- Songwriters: Moby; Lana Michele Moorer; Angela Stone; Michael McDermon
- Producer: Moby

Moby singles chronology
"In My Heart" (2003)	"Jam for the Ladies" (2003)	"Make Love Fuck War" (2004)

Princess Superstar singles chronology
"Fuck Me on the Dancefloor" (2003)	"Jam for the Ladies" (2003)	"Coochie Coo" (2005)

Music video
- "Jam for the Ladies" on YouTube

"Jam for the Ladies" is a song by American electronica musician Moby. It was released as the sixth and final single from his sixth studio album, 18, on July 21, 2003. The song features guest vocals from rapper MC Lyte and R&B singer Angie Stone and incorporates a vocal sample from "Wherever You Are" by Mic Geronimo. The single version is a collaboration with American rapper Princess Superstar. In reference to its number of collaborators, Moby has described "Jam for the Ladies" as a "crowded song". The song's music video was directed by Simon and Jon and later included on 18 B Sides + DVD.

== Track listing ==
- CD single
1. "Jam for the Ladies" (radio mix with Princess Superstar) – 3:05
2. "Jam for the Ladies" (Voodoo Child Remix) – 5:00
3. "Jam for the Ladies" (Nevins Club Blaster Mix) – 7:46
4. "Jam for the Ladies" (Fancy's Mix) – 3:03
5. "Jam for the Ladies" (Nevins Reggae Dub Banger) – 7:04
6. "Bed" – 4:18
7. "Ace Love" – 5:49
- 12-inch single
1. "Jam for the Ladies" (Nevins Club Blaster Mix) – 7:46
2. "Jam for the Ladies" (Voodoo Child Remix) – 5:00
3. "Jam for the Ladies" (Nevins Reggae Dub Banger) – 7:04
4. "Jam for the Ladies" (Fancy's Mix) – 3:03
5. "Jam for the Ladies" (radio mix with Princess Superstar) – 3:05

== Charts ==
Weekly chart performance for "Jam for the Ladies"
Chart (2003)	Peak position
Australia (ARIA)	62
Belgium (Ultratip Bubbling Under Flanders)	14
