= In This World (song) =

2002 single by Moby

Single by Moby

from the album 18
- B-side: "Piano & Strings"; "Downhill"
- Released: November 4, 2002
- Length: 4:02 (album version); 3:26 (single version)
- Label: Mute
- Songwriter: Moby
- Producer: Moby

Moby singles chronology
| "Extreme Ways" (2002) | "In This World" (2002) | "Sunday (The Day Before My Birthday)" (2003) |

Music video
- "Moby - 'In This World' (Official Video)" on YouTube

"In This World" is a song by American electronica musician Moby. It was released as the third single from his sixth studio album 18 on November 4, 2002. It peaked at number 35 on the UK Singles Chart. The song incorporates prominent vocal samples from "Lord Don't Leave Me" by the Davis Sisters.

== Music video ==
The music video for "In This World", directed by Style Wars, features aliens from a small asteroid, who are planning a mission to the Earth bringing customary Earth greetings, including "Hello", "Hi", and "Hola". Three aliens and their dog-like creature then board a flying saucer en route to Earth. They land, and quickly realize that the people, inhabitants of New York, are much larger than they had expected—so large in fact that the aliens go unnoticed, despite their best efforts. At the end of the video, a man (played by Moby) notices them, but walks away. They then go back to their home planet, and make a giant sign, bearing the word "Hello".

The music video for the song "Sunday (The Day Before My Birthday)" acts as the sequel to the story.

== Track listings ==
- CD single (CDMUTE276)
1. "In This World" – 3:26
2. "Piano & Strings" – 5:16
3. "Downhill" – 5:18
- CD single – remixes (LCDMUTE276)
1. "In This World" (T&F vs. Moltosugo Club Mix – edit) – 2:59
2. "In This World" (ATFC's Southern Fried Vocal) – 7:40
3. "In This World" (Push Vocal Club Mix) – 7:59
- 12-inch single (12MUTE276)
1. "In This World" (ATFC's Deep South Dub) – 7:40
2. "In This World" (Slacker's Rain Before Carnival Mix) – 11:55

== Charts ==
| Chart (2002–2003) | Peak position |
|---|---|
| Australia (ARIA) | 88 |
| Belgium (Ultratop 50 Flanders) | 19 |
| Belgium (Ultratop 50 Wallonia) | 16 |
| France (SNEP) | 22 |
| Germany (GfK) | 78 |
| Hungary (Single Top 40) | 15 |
| Italy (FIMI) | 30 |
| Netherlands (Single Top 100) | 47 |
| Poland (PiF PaF) | 1 |
| Scotland Singles (Official Charts) | 31 |
| Switzerland (Schweizer Hitparade) | 66 |
| UK Singles (Official Charts) | 35 |
| UK Dance (Official Charts) | 10 |
| UK Indie (Official Charts) | 3 |
| US Dance Club Songs (Billboard) | 18 |

== Release history ==
| Region | Date | Format(s) | Label(s) | Ref. |
|---|---|---|---|---|
| United Kingdom | November 4, 2002 | CD | Mute | |
| Australia | November 11, 2002 | CD | Mute | |
