= Sunday (The Day Before My Birthday) =

2003 single by Moby

Single by Moby

from the album 18
- B-side: "And I Know"; "ISS"; "In My Heart" (Ferry Corsten remix)
- Released: March 3, 2003
- Length: 5:09 (album version); 3:22 (single version)
- Label: Mute
- Songwriters: Moby; Sylvia Robinson
- Producer: Moby

Moby singles chronology
"In This World" (2002)	"Sunday (The Day Before My Birthday)" (2003)	"In My Heart" (2003)

Music video
- "Moby - Sunday (The Day Before My Birthday)" on YouTube

"Sunday (The Day Before My Birthday)" is a song by American electronica musician Moby. It was released as the fourth single from his sixth studio album, 18, on February 24, 2003. The song features samples of American singer and Sugar Hill Records founder Sylvia Robinson's song "Sunday".

== Music video ==
The music video for "Sunday (The Day Before My Birthday)" was directed by Style Wars, who previously directed the video for Moby's "In This World". It acts as a sequel to the "In This World" video, featuring the same alien characters from the video returning to Earth, this time being recognized on the Hollywood Walk of Fame. They become renowned celebrities and enjoy major success, including a television series. The end of the video shows the aliens piloting their spacecraft back to their much less stressful home planet.

== Track listings ==
- CD single (CDMUTE280)
1. "Sunday (The Day Before My Birthday)" (radio mix) – 3:22
2. "And I Know" – 4:45
3. "ISS" – 8:45
4. "Sunday (The Day Before My Birthday)" (video) – 3:25
- CD single (LCDMUTE280)
1. "Sunday (The Day Before My Birthday)" (West London Deep club mix – radio edit) – 3:46
2. "Sunday (The Day Before My Birthday)" (The Boris Dlugosch & Michi Lange Headbanger Session) – 5:40
3. "In My Heart" (Ferry Corsten remix) – 7:33
- 12-inch single (12MUTE280)
1. "Sunday (The Day Before My Birthday)" (West London Deep club mix) – 9:05
2. "Sunday (The Day Before My Birthday)" (T&F vs. Moltosugo club mix) – 7:31

== Charts ==
Weekly chart performance for "Sunday (The Day Before My Birthday)"
Chart (2003)	Peak position
Belgium (Ultratip Bubbling Under Flanders)	9
Belgium (Ultratip Bubbling Under Wallonia)	9
Netherlands (Single Top 100)	93

== Release history ==
Release dates and formats for "Sunday (The Day Before My Birthday)"
Region	Date	Format(s)	Label(s)	Ref.
United Kingdom	March 3, 2003	12-inch vinyl; CD	Mute	
Australia	March 17, 2003	CD	Mute	
