= Raining Again =

Single by Moby

from the album Hotel
- B-side: "It's OK"; "Put the Headphones On"
- Released: May 23, 2005
- Length: 3:43 (album version); 3:30 (single version)
- Label: Mute
- Songwriter: Moby
- Producer: Moby

Moby singles chronology
"Lift Me Up" (2005)	"Raining Again" (2005)	"Spiders" (2005)

Music video
- "Moby 'Raining Again' - Official video" on YouTube

"Raining Again" is a song by American electronica musician Moby. It was released as the second single from his seventh studio album Hotel in mainland Europe on May 23, 2005, by Mute Records and in Australia on June 6, 2005, by EMI Music Australia.

== Track listing ==
- CD single (ICDMUTE345)
1. "Raining Again" (edit) – 3:30
2. "It's OK" – 3:53
3. "Put the Headphones On" – 3:49
4. "Raining Again" (Evil Nine Remix) – 7:41
5. "Raining Again" (Steve Angello's Vocal Mix) – 6:55
6. "Raining Again" (video) – 3:48
- 12-inch single (12MUTE345)
1. "Raining Again" (Steve Angello's Vocal Mix) – 6:55
2. "Raining Again" (Ewan Pearson Vocal) – 7:07
3. "Raining Again" (Ewan Pearson Instrumental) – 7:07
- Digital single
1. "Raining Again" (radio version) – 3:30
2. "It's OK" – 3:53
3. "Put the Headphones On" – 3:49
4. "Raining Again" (Evil Nine Remix) – 7:41
5. "Raining Again" (Steve Angello's Vocal Mix) – 6:55
6. "Raining Again" (Ewan Pearson Vocal) – 7:07
7. "Raining Again" (David Duriez Lunar Disco Mix) – 6:37
8. "Raining Again" (David Duriez Lunar Disco Dub) – 6:45

== Charts ==
Chart performance for "Raining Again"
Chart (2005)	Peak position
Australia (ARIA)	52
Belgium (Ultratip Bubbling Under Flanders)	7
Belgium (Ultratip Bubbling Under Wallonia)	4
Finland (Suomen virallinen lista)	14
Germany (GfK)	82
Italy (FIMI)	41
Spain (Promusicae)	6
Switzerland (Schweizer Hitparade)	96
UK Dance (Official Charts Company)	23
