= In My Heart (Moby song) =

2003 single by Moby

Single by Moby

from the album 18
- B-side: "And I Know"
- Released: 2003
- Length: 4:36
- Label: Mute
- Songwriter: Moby
- Producer: Moby

Moby singles chronology
"Sunday (The Day Before My Birthday)" (2003)	"In My Heart" (2003)	"Jam for the Ladies" (2003)

Audio video
- "Moby - In My Heart (Official Audio)" on YouTube

"In My Heart" is a song by American electronica musician Moby. It was released as the fifth single from his sixth studio album, 18, exclusively in France in 2003. In 2005, the song was featured in commercials for the Nokia Nseries and became a free-included song on Music Edition of the Nokia Nseries.

== Track listing ==
- CD single
1. "In My Heart" – 4:36
2. "And I Know" – 4:45

== Charts ==
Chart (2003)	Peak position
France (SNEP)	76
