= Robert Ludlum bibliography =

Robert Ludlum (1927–2001) was an American author of twenty-seven novels between 1971 and 2006, the last being issued five years after his death. Of his twenty-seven novels, two were originally published under the pseudonym of Jonathan Ryder and another under the pseudonym of Michael Shepherd. Ludlum also created the Covert-One series, overseeing the first three novels with Gayle Lynds and Philip Shelby before his death.

Following Ludlum's death, his estate has continued to publish novels under his name with eleven authors having written a combined thirty-six novels under the Ludlum brand, a trademark inscription of "Robert Ludlum's" on every book (e.g. Robert Ludlum's The Bourne Dominion). Since 2019, publishing rights in the United States have been held by G. P. Putnam's Sons, taking over from Grand Central Publishing who held the rights from 2007 to 2017. The latest book to be published is The Bourne Revenge by Brian Freeman.

== Works ==
Title	Year	Series	First edition publisher	Notes	Ref
The Scarlatti Inheritance	1971	—	World Publishing Company		
The Osterman Weekend	1972	—	World Publishing Company		
The Matlock Paper	1973	—	Dial Press		
Trevayne	1973	—	Delacorte Press	Written under the pen-name Jonathan Ryder	
The Cry of the Halidon	1974	—	Delacorte Press	Written under the pen-name Jonathan Ryder	
The Rhinemann Exchange	1974	—	Dial Press		
The Road to Gandolfo	1975	The Road To (#1)	Dial Press	Written under the pen-name Michael Shepherd	
The Gemini Contenders	1976	—	Dial Press		
The Chancellor Manuscript	1977	—	Dial Press		
The Holcroft Covenant	1978	—	Richard Marek Publishers		
The Matarese Circle	1979	Matarese (#1)	Richard Marek Publishers		
The Bourne Identity	1980	Jason Bourne (#1)	Richard Marek Publishers		
The Parsifal Mosaic	1982	—	Random House		
The Aquitaine Progression	1984	—	Random House		
The Bourne Supremacy	1986	Jason Bourne (#2)	Random House		
The Icarus Agenda	1988	—	Random House		
The Bourne Ultimatum	1990	Jason Bourne (#3)	Random House		
The Road to Omaha	1992	The Road To (#2)	Random House	Sequel to The Road to Gandolfo	
The Scorpio Illusion	1993	—	Bantam Books		
The Apocalypse Watch	1995	—	Bantam Books		
The Matarese Countdown	1997	Matarese (#2)	Bantam Books	Sequel to The Matarese Circle	
The Hades Factor	2000	Covert-One (#1)	St. Martin's Griffin	Written with Gayle Lynds	
The Prometheus Deception	2000	—	St. Martin's Press		
The Cassandra Compact	2001	Covert-One (#2)	St. Martin's Griffin	Posthumous publication. Written with Philip Shelby	
The Sigma Protocol	2001	—	St. Martin's Press	Posthumous publication	
The Paris Option	2002	Covert-One (#3)	St. Martin's Griffin	Posthumous publication. Written with Gayle Lynds	
The Janson Directive	2002	Paul Janson (#1)	St. Martin's Press	Posthumous publication	
The Tristan Betrayal	2003	—	St. Martin's Press	Posthumous publication	
The Ambler Warning	2005	—	St. Martin's Press	Posthumous publication. Completed by a ghostwriter	
The Bancroft Strategy	2006	—	St. Martin's Press	Posthumous publication	

=== Works by other authors based on the author's characters ===
Title	Year	Series	First edition publisher	Notes	Ref
The Altman Code	2003	Covert-One (#4)	St. Martin's Press	Written under the Ludlum brand by Gayle Lynds	
The Bourne Legacy	2004	Jason Bourne (#4)	St. Martin's Press	Written under the Ludlum brand by Eric Van Lustbader	
The Lazarus Vendetta	2004	Covert-One (#5)	St. Martin's Griffin	Written under the Ludlum brand by Patrick Larkin	
The Moscow Vector	2005	Covert-One (#6)	St. Martin's Griffin	Written under the Ludlum brand by Patrick Larkin	
The Bourne Betrayal	2007	Jason Bourne (#5)	Warner Books	Written under the Ludlum brand by Eric Van Lustbader	
The Arctic Event	2007	Covert-One (#7)	Grand Central Publishing	Written under the Ludlum brand by James H. Cobb	
The Bourne Sanction	2008	Jason Bourne (#6)	Grand Central Publishing	Written under the Ludlum brand by Eric Van Lustbader	
The Bourne Deception	2009	Jason Bourne (#7)	Grand Central Publishing	Written under the Ludlum brand by Eric Van Lustbader	
The Bourne Objective	2010	Jason Bourne (#8)	Grand Central Publishing	Written under the Ludlum brand by Eric Van Lustbader	
The Bourne Dominion	2011	Jason Bourne (#9)	Grand Central Publishing	Written under the Ludlum brand by Eric Van Lustbader	
The Ares Decision	2011	Covert-One (#8)	Grand Central Publishing	Written under the Ludlum brand by Kyle Mills	
The Janson Command	2012	Paul Janson (#2)	Grand Central Publishing	Written under the Ludlum brand by Paul Garrison	
The Bourne Imperative	2012	Jason Bourne (#10)	Grand Central Publishing	Written under the Ludlum brand by Eric Van Lustbader	
The Janus Reprisal	2012	Covert-One (#9)	Grand Central Publishing	Written under the Ludlum brand by Jamie Freveletti	
The Utopia Experiment	2013	Covert-One (#10)	Grand Central Publishing	Written under the Ludlum brand by Kyle Mills	
The Bourne Retribution	2013	Jason Bourne (#11)	Grand Central Publishing	Written under the Ludlum brand by Eric Van Lustbader	
The Janson Option	2014	Paul Janson (#3)	Grand Central Publishing	Written under the Ludlum brand by Paul Garrison	
The Bourne Ascendancy	2014	Jason Bourne (#12)	Grand Central Publishing	Written under the Ludlum brand by Eric Van Lustbader	
The Geneva Strategy	2015	Covert-One (#11)	Grand Central Publishing	Written under the Ludlum brand by Jamie Freveletti	
The Janson Equation	2015	Paul Janson (#4)	Grand Central Publishing	Written under the Ludlum brand by Douglas Corleone	
The Patriot Attack	2015	Covert-One (#12)	Grand Central Publishing	Written under the Ludlum brand by Kyle Mills	
The Bourne Enigma	2016	Jason Bourne (#13)	Grand Central Publishing	Written under the Ludlum brand by Eric Van Lustbader	
The Bourne Initiative	2017	Jason Bourne (#14)	Grand Central Publishing	Written under the Ludlum brand by Eric Van Lustbader	
The Treadstone Resurrection	2020	Treadstone (#1)	G. P. Putnam's Sons	Written under the Ludlum brand by Joshua Hood	
The Bourne Evolution	2020	Jason Bourne (#15)	G. P. Putnam's Sons	Written under the Ludlum brand by Brian Freeman	
The Treadstone Exile	2021	Treadstone (#2)	G. P. Putnam's Sons	Written under the Ludlum brand by Joshua Hood	
The Bourne Treachery	2021	Jason Bourne (#16)	G. P. Putnam's Sons	Written under the Ludlum brand by Brian Freeman	
The Treadstone Transgression	2022	Treadstone (#3)	G. P. Putnam's Sons	Written under the Ludlum brand by Joshua Hood	
The Bourne Sacrifice	2022	Jason Bourne (#17)	G. P. Putnam's Sons	Written under the Ludlum brand by Brian Freeman	
The Blackbriar Genesis	2022	Blackbriar (#1)	G. P. Putnam's Sons	Written under the Ludlum brand by Simon Gervais	
The Treadstone Rendition	2023	Treadstone (#4)	G. P. Putnam's Sons	Written under the Ludlum brand by Joshua Hood	
The Bourne Defiance	2023	Jason Bourne (#18)	G. P. Putnam's Sons	Written under the Ludlum brand by Brian Freeman	
The Bourne Shadow	2024	Jason Bourne (#19)	G. P. Putnam's Sons	Written under the Ludlum brand by Brian Freeman	
The Bourne Vendetta	2025	Jason Bourne (#20)	G. P. Putnam's Sons	Written under the Ludlum brand by Brian Freeman	
The Bourne Escape	2025	Jason Bourne (#21)	G. P. Putnam's Sons	Written under the Ludlum brand by Brian Freeman	
The Bourne Revenge	2026	Jason Bourne (#22)	G. P. Putnam's Sons	Written under the Ludlum brand by Brian Freeman	
