= List of fictional secret agents =

This is a list of fictional secret agents .

== Books ==
- Alec Leamas in John le Carré's The Spy Who Came in from the Cold
- Alex Rider, young "informal" MI6 agent in Anthony Horowitz's Alex Rider series. The series also includes Alan Blunt, head of MI6 Special Operations.
- Ali Imran in the Imran series
- Basil Argyros in the Harry Turtledove short story series collected in Agent of Byzanium
- Basil St. Florian, the main protagonist of Stephen Hunter's 2021 novel Basil's War
- Blackford Oakes is a Central Intelligence Agency officer, spy and the protagonist of a series of novels written by William F. Buckley
- Carl Hamilton, Swedish secret agent from the Books of Jan Guillou
- Daniel Marchant, MI6 agent in Dead Spy Running and Games Traitors Play by Jon Stock
- David Shirazi in Joel C. Rosenberg's The Twelfth Imam
- Dominika Egorova, an SVR agent and the main protagonist of the Red Sparrow trilogy by Jason Matthews
- Drongo in Chingiz Abdullayev's books
- Elinor White in the 2023 novel The White Lady by Jacqueline Winspear
- Emily Pollifax in Dorothy Gilman's books
- George Smiley in the novels of John le Carré
- Hal Ambler, in The Ambler Warning by Robert Ludlum
- Jack Ryan, in The Hunt for Red October and Patriot Games by Tom Clancy
- James Adams from the Robert Muchamore's CHERUB series
- James Bond in Ian Fleming's books, which also include CIA agent Felix Leiter. See List of James Bond allies for a complete list of 00-agents and secret agents found throughout Fleming's books
- James Wormold in Graham Greene's Our Man in Havana
- Jane Blonde, in the Jane Blonde series by Jill Marshall
- Jason Bourne in the Bourne books by Robert Ludlum
- Jason Love in Passport to Oblivion by James Leasor
- Jason Monk, a CIA recruiter and agent runner in Frederick Forsyth's Icon
- Jerry Cornelius in Michael Moorcock's books and short-stories
- John Craig in James Munro's books
- John Morpurgo in books by William Garner
- John Wells in The Faithful Spy by Alex Berenson
- Johnny Fedora in Desmond Cory's books
- Lemmy Caution, in Peter Cheyney's novels
- Masud Rana, a major and BCI (Bangladesh Counter Intelligence) agent (codename-MR9) portrayed in the Masud Rana series by Qazi Anwar Hussain
- Matt Drake, a DIA operative and the main protagonist of a series of novels by Don Bentley
- Matt Helm, in Donald Hamilton's books
- Michael Jagger in books by William Garner
- Mitch Rapp, CIA agent in counterterrorism unit known as the "Orion Team" in books by Vince Flynn
- Modesty Blaise, from the books by Peter O'Donnel
- Nancy Drew in Carolyn Keene's books
- Nick Carter-Killmaster (books)
- Normanby in P.G. Dixon's 2021 book Normanby
- Paul Kagan in David Morrell's 2008 novel The Spy Who Came for Christmas
- Penelope St. John-Orsini, in The Baroness novels by Paul Kenyon
- Peter Pettigrew, the pet rat of Ron Weasley in the Harry Potter books, working for Lord Voldemort
- Philip McAlpine in four novels by Adam Diment
- Philip Quest in four novels by Peter Townend
- Quiller in the series of thrillers by Elleston Trevor, writing as Adam Hall
- Sam Durell in Edward S. Aarons' books
- Sam Fisher in Tom Clancy's Splinter Cell books
- Sam Joseph in the 2021 novel Damascus Station by David McCloskey
- Scorpion from Andrew Kaplan's book
- Sean Ryan, ex-IRA member who features in series of novels by Brian Cleeve
- Severus Snape, an agent provocateur, informant, and double agent working for Dumbledore
- Sherlock Holmes in Arthur Conan Doyle's books
- Simon Templar, "The Saint", from the Leslie Charteris novels and subsequent adaptations
- Six in the Agent Six of Hearts series by Jack Heath
- Stephen Metcalfe in The Tristan Betrayal by Robert Ludlum
- Switters in Fierce Invalids Home from Hot Climates by Tom Robbins
- The Hardy Boys in Franklin W. Dixon's books
- The Secret Seven written by Enid Blyton (four child detectives)
- Tim Donohue, British secret agent from the book The Constant Gardener by John le Carré
- Tom Klay in Bryan Christy's 2021 novel In the Company of Killers
- Wyman Ford, from books by Douglas Preston

== Comics ==
- Abbey Chase
- Anacleto, agente secreto, Spanish secret agent in the comic series of the same name
- Captain Francis Blake
- Cybersix
- Derek Flint
- Dick Tracy
- Dynamo, Thunder Agents
- Jimmy Olsen
- John Stone, agent of S.T.O.R.M. in Wildstorm's comic Planetary
- KGBeast in DC Universe
- Lord Peter Flint in Warlord
- Lorraine Broughton in The Coldest City graphic novel
- Modesty Blaise
- Mortadelo and Filemón Pi, Spanish secret agents of the T.I.A.
- Slylock Fox
- Sarge Steel is a detective/spy character published by Charlton Comics during the 1960s. As he was published during the time of Charlton's Action Heroes line of superheroes, and had loose ties to some, he is sometimes included with that group. He was purchased by DC Comics along with the other "Action Heroes".
- King Faraday, featured in DC Comics. Faraday first appeared in Danger Trail #1 (July 1950), and was created by Robert Kanigher and Carmine Infantino.
- Amanda Waller appears in comic booklets in the DC Comics universe. The character first appeared in the Legends #1 issue of November 1986 and was created by writers John Ostrander and Len Wayne and illustrator John Byrne.
- Spy vs. Spy
- Twilight (alias Loid Forger), Nightfall (Fiona Frost), Daybreak, from Spy × Family
- Sir Roland King in King of Spies by Mark Millar and Matteo Scalera

=== Marvel ===
- Black Widow (Natasha Romanova)
- Bucky
- Clive Reston
- Elektra Natchios
- Jimmy Woo
- Maria Hill
- Nick Fury
- Pete Wisdom
- Richard and Mary Parker
- Shang-Chi
- Sharon Carter
- Peter Parker
- Yelena Belova

== Television/film ==
- Aaron Cross from The Bourne Legacy, a spin-off film from the Jason Bourne trilogy.
- Adam Carter in Spooks
- Agent 13 from the 1960s spy satire/parody sitcom, Get Smart
- Agent 44 from the 1960s spy satire/parody sitcom, Get Smart
- Agent 99 from the 1960s Spy satire/parody sitcom, Get Smart
- Agent Double 0-0 from Phineas and Ferb
- Agent Flemming from Beavis and Butthead Do America
- Agent J from the movies Men in Black (film), Men in Black II
- Agent K from the movies Men in Black (film), Men in Black II
- Agent Larabee from the 1960s spy satire/parody sitcom, Get Smart
- Agent Six from Generator Rex
- Agent Smith of The Matrix (franchise)
- Agent Vinod, from the 1977 and 2012 Indian spy films of the same name
- Alec Leamas, in the 1965 film The Spy Who Came in from the Cold
- Alexander Scott, from the TV series I Spy
- Allen Gamble and Terry Hoitz, from the movie The Other Guys
- Amos Burke, from TV series Burke's Law
- Annie Walker from the USA original series Covert Affairs
- Arun Khanna, from the 2003 Indian film The Hero: Love Story of a Spy
- Austin Powers from the Austin Powers Movies
- Bob Ho in The Spy Next Door
- Blain Whitaker in "MI High"
- Brianna Kelleher in Access Denied
- Bullwinkle J. Moose and Rocky the Flying Squirrel from The Adventures of Rocky and Bullwinkle
- Burt Macklin in Parks and Recreation (TV series)
- Callan in Callan (TV series)
- Cammie Morgan, from I'd Tell You I Love You, But Then I'd Have to Kill You
- Carl the Intern from Phineas and Ferb
- Carrie Mathison, from Showtime's Homeland (TV series)
- Charles Hood, in five novels by James Mayo
- Charles Vine in Licensed to Kill (1965 film)/The Second Best Secret Agent in the Whole Wide World, Where the Bullets Fly, Somebody's Stolen Our Russian Spy
- Chloe O'Brian in the Fox TV series 24
- Chuck Bartowski from the television series Chuck
- Cobra Bubbles from Lilo & Stitch
- Cody Banks from the movie Agent Cody Banks
- Cool McCool, from the cartoon of the same name
- Craig Stirling, Richard Barrett and Sharron McCready from the 1960s series, The Champions
- Dar Adal, from Showtime's Homeland (TV series)
- Darius Stone (Ice Cube) in XXX: State of the Union
- David Percival from Atomic Blonde
- Derek Flint, In Like Flint, Our Man Flint
- Dirk Bannon, Talia Bannon née Knockemoff, Spike Bannon, Elle Bannon and Boris Bannon from My Spy Family TV series
- Dudley Puppy and Kitty Katswell from T.U.F.F. Puppy
- Elihu 'Sam' Nivens in The Puppet Masters
- Elim Garak from Star Trek: Deep Space Nine
- Energy Management Center from Tokumei Sentai Go-Busters
- Erik Heller from the 2011 film Hanna and the 2019 TV series of the same name
- Ethan Hunt in the Mission Impossible film series
- Evelyn Salt in Salt
- Father Unwin from The Secret Service
- FDR Foster in This Means War
- Felicity Sarah Flint in the webcomics Basil Flint, P.I. and Felicity Flint, agent from H.A.R.M.
- Miss Froy, in Alfred Hitchcock's 1938 film The Lady Vanishes
- George Smiley from John le Carré's novels
- Ginger Cat from Talking Friends
- Gru and Lucy from Despicable Me
- Hans Kloss/J-23 in Stawka większa niż życie (Stakes Larger Than Life)
- Harry Palmer from The Ipcress File, Funeral in Berlin, and Billion Dollar Brain based on novels by Len Deighton
- Harry Tasker in True Lies
- Hymie the CONTROL robot from the 1960s Spy satire/parody sitcom, Get Smart
- Howard Finch from the CBS crime drama television series Person of Interest
- Hamza Ali Mazari/Jaskirat Singh Rangi in Dhurandhar and Dhurandhar The Revenge
- Irina Derevko from Alias
- Jack Bauer in the Fox TV series 24
- Jack Burns, an agent of Sector 7 in the 2018 film Bumblebee
- Jake Peralta, Rosa Diaz, Charles Boyle, Amy Santiago, and Terry Jeffords from Brooklyn Nine-Nine
- James Bond in the movies based on Ian Fleming's novels, which also include CIA agent Felix Leiter. See List of James Bond allies for a complete list of 00 agents and secret agents found throughout the movies.
- Jason Bourne from Bourne trilogy based on the novels by Robert Ludlum
- Jason Monk from the 2005 film Frederick Forsyth's Icon
- Jerry Lewis from Totally Spies. Head of WOOHP.
- Jill Munroe from Charlie's Angels
- John & Jane Smith, from Mr. and Mrs. Smith
- John Casey from the television series Chuck
- John Drake in Danger Man
- John Steed, Cathy Gale Emma Peel and Tara King in The Avengers
- John Reese from the CBS crime drama television series Person of Interest.
- John Steed, Mike Gambit and Purdey in The New Avengers
- Jonathan Pine from The Night Manager (British TV series)
- June Stahl from Sons of Anarchy
- Kelly Robinson, from the TV series I Spy
- Kelvin Inman in Lost
- Kim Possible, from the TV series Kim Possible
- Kabir Dhaliwal, from YRF Spy Universe
- Lance Sterling from the film Spies in Disguise
- Lancelot Link "Lancelot Link: Secret Chimp"
- Leon S Kennedy, from Resident Evil 4
- Liu Jian from Kiss of the Dragon
- Lorraine Broughton from Atomic Blonde
- Luther Sloan from Star Trek: Deep Space Nine
- Lyla Lolliberry in Phineas and Ferb
- MacGyver from MacGyver
- Martin Rauch (codename Kolibri) from "Deutschland" series (Deutschland 83, Deutschland 86, Deutschland 89)
- Mater, Finn McMissile and Holley Shiftwell from Cars 2
- Matt Helm from The Silencers (1966), Murderer's Row (1966), The Ambushers (1967), The Wrecking Crew (1969)
- Matt in Death Note
- Maxwell Smart from the 1960s spy satire/parody sitcom, Get Smart
- McGruff the Crime Dog
- Michael 'Desolation' Jones from Desolation Jones
- Michael Westen from the USA original series Burn Notice
- Mike Traceur, also known as Michael, Mike, Knight from the 2008 Knight Rider
- Michael Knight, played by David Hasselhoff in the original Knight Rider series
- Mr. Black and Mr. White from Johnny Test
- Mr. Verloc in Joseph Conrad's The Secret Agent
- Mylene Hoffman, from the anime 009-1
- Nikita, Michael, Birkoff, Walter, Madeline, Paul of Section 1 La Femme Nikita
- Number Six in The Prisoner
- Pathan, from the Indian YRF Spy Universe
- Paul Janson in The Janson Directive
- Perry the Platypus from Phineas and Ferb
- Peter the Panda from Phineas and Ferb
- Phil Coulson of Marvel Cinematic Universe
- Philip and Elizabeth Jennings of The Americans
- Pinky the Chihuahua from Phineas and Ferb
- The Protagonist from Tenet
- Rouge the Bat, a secret agent for GUN in the Sonic the Hedgehog series
- Russ Cargill from The Simpsons Movie
- Sam in Spynet
- Sam, Clover and Alex and others from Totally Spies.
- Sameen Shaw from the CBS crime drama television series Person of Interest.
- Sarah Walker from the television series Chuck
- Saul Berenson, from Showtime's Homeland (TV series)
- Scarecrow (Lee Stetson) in Scarecrow and Mrs. King
- Secret Squirrel and Morocco Mole
- Several agents for the Organization Without a Cool Acronym (OWCA) in Phineas and Ferb
- Shadow the Hedgehog, a secret agent for GUN in the Sonic the Hedgehog series
- Special Agent Oso
- Stan Smith from the animated series American Dad!
- Sterling Archer from the animated series Archer
- Sydney Bristow in Alias
- The Man from U.N.C.L.E. 1960s TV show; Napoleon Solo and Illya Kuryakin
- Tiger/Avinash Singh Rathore, from the Indian Tiger film series, part of the YRF Spy Universe
- Tobin Frost and Matt Weston, the main characters in the 2012 film Safe House
- Tom Quinn in Spooks
- Tony Almeida in the Fox TV series 24
- Tuck Henson in This Means War
- Twilight in Spy × Family
- Vishwanath in the Indian spy films Vishwaroopam (2013) and Vishwaroopam (2018)
- Vesper Lynd from Casino Royale
- Xander Cage (Vin Diesel) in xXx
- Ziva David from NCIS
- Bill Cunningham from The Enid Blyton Adventure Series

== Video games ==
- Ada Wong, from the videogame series Resident Evil
- Agent 47, from the videogame series Hitman
- Agent Blackbird, Boxer, Deacon, Desdemona, Doctor Carrington, Drummer Boy, Dutchman, Father Clifford, Glory, Helena, Herbert Dashwood, Highrise, Liam "Patriot" Binet, Manya Vargas, Maven, Mister Tims, P.A.M., Ricky Dalton, Songbird, Tinker Tom, Tommy Whispers, Tulip, Victoria Watts, and the Sole Survivor (optional-if you join the Railroad organization) from Fallout 4
- Agents Sasha Nein and Milla Vodello from Psychonauts
- Alexi Dravic from Alpha Protocol
- Big Boss, from the videogame series Metal Gear
- Bishop and Shiela from the PS2 video game Spy Fiction
- Booger Hasenpfeffer from Webkinz
- Cate Archer from No One Lives Forever
- Cole Phelps from L. A. Noire
- David Wolf from Secret Agent
- Desmond from Fallout 3
- Director from Club Penguin (EPF)
- Dot (D.) from Club Penguin (EPF)
- G. from Club Penguin (EPF)
- Gabriel Logan from Syphon Filter
- Genya Arikado from Castlevania
- Goober Hasenpfeffer from Webkinz
- Iron Bull from Dragon Age: Inquisition
- JC Denton from Deus Ex
- Jet Pack Guy from Club Penguin (EPF)
- Joanna Dark in the Nintendo 64 video game Perfect Dark
- Michael Thorton from Alpha Protocol
- Max Payne from the videogame series Max Payne
- Natalya Ivanova from Destroy All Humans 2
- Leliana (Sister Nightingale) from the Dragon Age series.
- Norman Jayden, from Heavy Rain
- PP from Club Penguin (EPF)
- Raiden, from the videogame series Metal Gear
- Revolver Ocelot, from the videogame series Metal Gear
- Rookie from Club Penguin (EPF)
- Russell Adler from Call of Duty: Black Ops Cold War
- Sam Fisher, from the videogame series Splinter Cell
- Solid Snake, from the videogame series Metal Gear
- Spy Fox, from the videogame series Spy Fox
- Steve Haines, Dave Norton, and Andreas Sanchez from Grand Theft Auto V
- Tallis from Dragon Age II: Mark of the Assassin
- The Spy from Team Fortress 2
- Luciel Choi from Mystic Messenger
- Vanderwood from Mystic Messenger
- United Liberty Paper Contact and Karen Daniels from Grand Theft Auto IV
- Kyle Crane from Dying Light
- Phosphorus from the Roblox video game Forsaken

== Radio dramas ==
Jason Whittaker from Adventures in Odyssey

== Parodies of secret agents ==
- Agent 327
- Austin Powers
- Boris and Natasha from Rocky and Bullwinkle
- Brandon Scofield in The Matarese Circle and The Matarese Countdown
- Derek Flint from Our Man Flint and In Like Flint
- Desmond Simpkins from Carry On Spying
- I Spy
- Jane Blonde
- Johnny English
- Joonas G. Breitenfeldt from Agent 000 and the Deadly Curves
- Lego Agents
- Maxwell Smart and Agent 99 from Get Smart, 1960s TV show
- Perry the Platypus from the cartoon Phineas and Ferb
- OSS 117
- Secret Squirrel, a cartoon character
- Spy Kids
- Spy vs. Spy
- Sterling Archer, from the animated series Archer

== See also ==
- Emergency service
- Law enforcement agency
- List of fictional secret police and intelligence organizations
- List of fictional espionage organizations
- Spy agent
- Spy fiction
