= The Prometheus Deception =

2000 novel by Robert Ludlum

- The Prometheus Deception first edition cover.
- Author: Robert Ludlum
- Language: English
- Genre: Spy novel
- Publisher: St. Martin's Press
- Publication date: October 31, 2000
- Publication place: United States
- Media type: Print (Hardback & Paperback)
- Pages: 384 pp (first edition)
- ISBN: 0-312-25346-X
- OCLC: 44640451
- Dewey Decimal: 813/.54 21
- LC Class: PS3562.U26 P76 2000

The Prometheus Deception is a spy fiction thriller novel written in 2000 by Robert Ludlum about an agent in an ultraclandestine agency known only as the Directorate named Nick Bryson, alias Jonas Barett, alias Jonathan Coleridge, alias The Technician, who is thrown into a fight between an organization he knows as Prometheus and his former employers at the Directorate.

Like other Ludlum novels, The Prometheus Deception conveys Ludlum's concern about the accumulation of power by individuals or organizations. Whereas some of his prior novels, such as The Holcroft Covenant and The Aquitaine Progression featured conspiracies by governments or political extremists to seize control of the world, The Prometheus Deception features a conspiracy by a very large company. Though it details the reaction of governments to a series of major terrorist attacks, The Prometheus Deception was written before the events of September 11, 2001. Readers have noted a striking similarity between the novel's plot and the synopsis of the TV show "Alias," (aired September 30, 2001 to May 22, 2006) in which a secret agent working for what she believes is the CIA discovers she's been working for a terrorist organization all along.

The Prometheus Deception was one of Ludlum's last books published in his lifetime.

== Plot ==
The story begins with the protagonist, under the alias the Technician, who is in deep cover to stop the Hezbollah terrorist organization from overthrowing the government of Tunisia. The operation appears to be going well, until the terrorists discover that the weapons the Technician has supplied them are defective. Before the ensuing battle is over, though, Abu (the leader of the terrorist agency) manages to stab him in the abdomen. He is helicoptered out, and we next find him entering the headquarters of the Directorate.

We meet his boss, Ted Waller, a lover of puzzles. Waller fires Bryson from the Directorate, saying he's lost his touch; Bryson is now told to live as a professor of Byzantine history under the alias of Jonas Barett. After some initial drunkenness and a search for oblivion because his wife, Elena, has left him, he agrees to take the job. He lives under this alias for 5 years and becomes a popular professor, until the deputy director of Central Intelligence at the CIA, Harry Dunne, confronts him with a shocking revelation.

We learn that the Directorate is really a Russian intelligence operation created by GRU masterminds: essentially a penetration operation on American soil. He learns that his boss is really Gennady Rosovsky, who assumed the name of Ted Waller after the English poet Edmund Waller. Dunne says that Bryson's entire life, including his parents' death, was engineered by the Directorate to lead him to be a part of the agency. Every mission Bryson has undertaken was designed to hurt American interests, which horrifies him.

Bryson is convinced to go after the Directorate and infiltrates a weapons tanker to find out what they're doing with weapons they're amassing. There he meets Layla, and after blowing up the tanker and amassing an arsenal, he continues to search for the Directorate; however, it seems that everywhere he goes there is a terrorist attack that follows. He pursues the trail of his former contacts with the Directorate. He meets with a former colleague, Jan Vansina, only to have Vansina killed before his eyes.

At another point, when he is about to be shot by a former enemy, he is saved by Waller, who explains that Harry Dunne is really a part of Prometheus, an organization of business executives and powerful politicians around the world. The members of Prometheus are pushing the Treaty on Surveillance, which would allow for an international super-FBI, and their own Richard Lanchester (a former businessman turned politician) would be at the head. The implication is that this organization, because its members own information companies would then be able to monitor everything that went on in the world, and thereby control it.

The Directorate's headquarters are destroyed, and he and his wife, Elena, united again, barely escape. He learns that money is being wired to members of the organization through a bank owned by Meredith Waterman, a respected bank. He goes to the bank headquarters and sneaks into their archives. There he learns of a business choice that forced the company to be sold to a certain Gregson Manning, the CEO of the world's largest company, Systematix, which owns health insurance companies, satellites, software, and thus many ways to get information on people. Manning, of course, is a member of Prometheus.

Now, Bryson and Elena must infiltrate Manning's mansion to crash the meeting of Prometheus's leaders, days before they assume control. However, he finds Ted Waller at the mansion, escaped from the Directorate's destruction and a double agent. Bryson is surrounded and about to be executed when a machine he's purchased, a virtual cathode oscillator, destroys the machinery in Manning's home and disables all the "smart guns" that are trained on him. Most of the guests in the mansion are trapped and killed, seemingly ending the Prometheus Group.

Nick and Elena quietly move to a tropical location somewhat assured to be isolated and away from any monitoring devices. Their peace is interrupted when Waller taps into their satellite TV, and promises that they will meet again.

== Critical reaction ==
Publishers Weekly said, "Ludlum goes full throttle in this frantically paced, if somewhat hollow, tale of one man's efforts to thwart the forces of world domination. ... Ludlum's cautionary theme - that technology will soon allow for surveillance on a scale that grossly infringes on personal privacy - gets lost in the barrage of flying bullets and explosions," and Cahners Business Information said, "the story is an exciting showcase for all the latest spy gadgetry, but it has little of the contemplative quality and social context of Ludlum's finer efforts."

== Publication history ==
- 2000, US, St. Martin's Press ISBN 0-312-25346-X, Pub date October 31, 2000, Hardback
- 2001, US, St. Martin's Paperbacks ISBN 0-312-97836-7, Pub date October 14, 2001, Paperback
- 2001, UK, Orion ISBN 0-7528-4209-9, Pub date February 28, 2001, Hardback
- 2001, UK, Orion ISBN 0-7528-4407-5, Pub date October 11, 2001, Paperback
