= Jamie Freveletti =

American writer of thriller novels

- Occupation: Writer
- Writing career
- Period: 2009–present
- Genre: Thriller
- Website: www.jamiefreveletti.com

Jamie Freveletti is an American writer of thriller novels. Her first novel, Running from the Devil, was published in 2009 and won the 2010 Barry Award for best thriller and the 2010 International Thriller Writers Awards best first novel. In 2011 Freveletti was selected by the Robert Ludlum estate to write a novel in the Covert-One series. Freveletti has currently published four novels and a novella in her Emma Caldridge series and two novels in the Covert-One series.

== Biography ==
Freveletti grew up in Addison, Illinois. After attending law school she moved to Geneva, Switzerland to study for a diploma in International Studies. Following her studies Freveletti started practicing as a trial attorney. Freveletti also holds a black belt in aikido and competes in ultramarathons. Freveletti's first thriller novel, Running from the Devil, was published in 2009 and featured the character Emma Caldridge. Running from the Devil won the 2010 Barry Award for best thriller and was named the best first novel at the 2010 International Thriller Writers Awards. The second novel in the Emma Caldridge series was released the following year and the third, The Ninth Day was released in 2011. In August 2011 it was announced that Freveletti had been selected by the Robert Ludlum Estate to write the next novel in the Covert-One series. It was released in 2012 entitled The Janus Reprisal. During 2012 Freveletti also published the fourth novel in the Emma Caldridge series and released the first of three parts in an Emma Caldridge novella. The following year her publisher released parts two and three of the novella which were entitled Gone and Run. In 2015 Freveletti's second novel in the Covert-One series, The Geneva Strategy, was released. Freveletti currently lives in Chicago with her family.

== Bibliography ==
=== Novels and novellas ===
Title	Year	Series	First edition publisher	Notes	Ref
Running from the Devil	2009	Emma Caldridge	William Morrow	Won 2010 Barry Award for best thriller Won 2010 International Thriller Writers Awards best first novel Nominated for 2010 Macavity Awards best first novel	
Running Dark	2010	Emma Caldridge	William Morrow		
The Ninth Day	2011	Emma Caldridge	Harper		
The Janus Reprisal	2012	Covert-One	Grand Central Publishing	Written under the Robert Ludlum brand	
Dead Asleep	2012	Emma Caldridge	Harper		
Risk	2012	Emma Caldridge	William Morrow	First part of the novella	
Gone	2013	Emma Caldridge	William Morrow	Second part of the novella	
Run	2013	Emma Caldridge	William Morrow	Third part of the novella	
The Geneva Strategy	2015	Covert-One	Grand Central Publishing	Written under the Robert Ludlum brand	
Blood Run	2017	Emma Caldridge	Calexia Press		

=== Short stories ===
Title	Year	Notes	Ref
"The Last Bad Morning: Exoneration"	2017	Written with Antione Day and first published in the anthology Anatomy of Innocence (edited by Laura Caldwell and Leslie S. Klinger)	
"The Ghost of the Lake"	2018	First published in the anthology For the Sake of the Game (edited by Laurie R. King and Leslie S. Klinger)	
"The Disappearing Place"	2023	First published in the anthology Infinity (edited by Catherine Coulter)	
