= Douglas Corleone =

American novelist and former lawyer

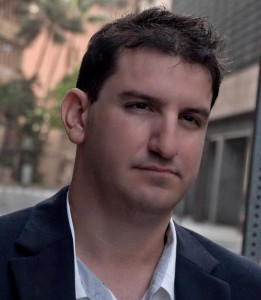
Douglas Corleone

Douglas Corleone is an American author of contemporary crime novels, including psychological and international thrillers. His debut novel One Man's Paradise won the Minotaur Books/Mystery Writers of America First Crime Novel Award. A former New York City criminal defense attorney, Corleone now resides in Hawaii. His most recent novels are the standalone psychological thrillers Falls to Pieces and Live Through This, published by Thomas & Mercer.

== Psychological Thrillers ==
Douglas Corleone's most recent works include the psychological thrillers Falls to Pieces, in which a mother and her teenage daughter in hiding are exposed when a missing persons case becomes public; and Live Through This, in which a middle-aged crime writer attends his college Homecoming to investigate the mysterious death of an ex-girlfriend.

== Kevin Corvelli Legal Thrillers ==
Corleone's first three novels feature the anti-hero protagonist Kevin Corvelli, a hard-drinking Honolulu criminal defense attorney seeking redemption following a high-profile professional free-fall in New York City. The Kevin Corvelli series includes One Man’s Paradise, Night on Fire, and Last Lawyer Standing.

== Simon Fisk International Thrillers ==
Corleone's fourth novel Good As Gone is an international thriller introducing former U.S. Marshal Simon Fisk, a private contractor specializing in retrieving children abducted by their estranged parents and taken overseas to avoid U.S. custody laws. Haunted by his own daughter's disappearance a decade earlier, Simon Fisk refuses to take cases involving “stranger abductions,” until a French police lieutenant presents Simon with an ultimatum: spend years in a French prison in connection with an earlier case, or help to find a young American girl named Lindsay Sorkin, who was recently abducted from her parents’ hotel room in Paris. The Simon Fisk series also includes Payoff, Gone Cold, and Beyond Gone.

== Paul Janson Series ==
Corleone was selected by the Estate of Robert Ludlum, creator of the Jason Bourne series, to continue Ludlum's series of thrillers featuring ex-Navy SEAL and former government covert agent Paul Janson, who first appeared in the bestselling novel The Janson Directive. Other books in the series include The Janson Command and The Janson Option, both written by Paul Garrison. The fourth novel in the Paul Janson series, titled The Janson Equation, was released in 2015.

== Bibliography ==
- One Man’s Paradise (Minotaur Books, 2010)
- Night on Fire (Minotaur Books, 2011)
- Last Lawyer Standing (Minotaur Books, 2012)
- Good As Gone (Minotaur Books, 2013)
- Payoff (Minotaur Books, 2014)
- Gone Cold (Minotaur Books, 2015)
- Robert Ludlum's The Janson Equation (Grand Central, 2015)
- Beyond Gone (Severn House, 2020)
- The Rough Cut (Severn House, 2021)
- Falls to Pieces (Thomas & Mercer, 2025)
- The Yeti (Ghost Signal Press, 2025)
- Extinction Level (Ghost Signal Press, 2025)
- Live Through This (Thomas & Mercer, 2026)

== Awards ==
- 2009 Minotaur Books/Mystery Writers of America First Crime Novel Award
- 2011 Shamus Award Finalist for Best First Novel
- 2023 First Prize Horror2Comic Screenwriting Competition
