= Covert One: The Hades Factor =

2006 American television film

- DVD Cover
- Based on: The Hades Factor by Gayle Lynds
- Written by: Elwood Reid
- Directed by: Mick Jackson
- Starring: Stephen Dorff; Mira Sorvino; Blair Underwood; Sophia Myles; Jeffrey DeMunn; Danny Huston; Anjelica Huston
- Theme music composer: J. Peter Robinson
- Country of origin: United States
- Original languages: English; French; German

Production
- Producer: Sherri Saito
- Cinematography: Ivan Strasburg
- Editor: Lori Jane Coleman
- Running time: 158 minutes
- Production company: Sony Pictures Television

Original release
- Network: CBS
- Release: April 9, 2006

Covert One: The Hades Factor (a.k.a. Robert Ludlum's Covert One: The Hades Factor, The Hades Factor) is a made-for-TV thriller filmed in Toronto that first aired in 2006. Directed by Mick Jackson, the miniseries is loosely based on The Hades Factor, a 2000 novel written by Gayle Lynds as part of the Covert-One series created by Robert Ludlum.

The film depicts an Ebola outbreak in Berlin, which is connected to a bio-terrorism conspiracy.

== Plot ==
While in a retrieve operation of a virus in Berlin, the Covert One agent Rachel Russell is double-crossed by two dirty agents; she kills them and escapes, trying to find a hiding place and someone to trust to protect the vials.

Meanwhile, the former Covert One agent Dr. Jon Smith is also in Berlin with his beloved fiancée Sophie Amsden. They are participating in a congress. When three persons die with bleeding, the doctors disclose a Hades virus outbreak, an extreme rare Ebola variant. Jon and Sophie return to the US to research a cure, and Jon discovers a huge combination of bio-terrorism and conspiracy.

== Synopsis ==
The Hades Factor concerns an outbreak of a doomsday virus in the United States. Stephen Dorff stars as Lt.Colonel. Jonathan Smith, an expert in biochemistry who races around the globe trying to identify the source of the outbreak.

== Distribution ==
First broadcast as a two-part CBS miniseries in April 2006, Covert One: The Hades Factor has since aired as a film on Sky One. It was released on DVD by Sony Pictures.

== Cast ==
- Stephen Dorff as Jon Smith
- Mira Sorvino as Rachel Russell
- Blair Underwood as Palmer Addison
- Sophia Myles as Sophie Amsden
- Danny Huston as Fred Klein
- Colm Meaney as Peter Howell
- Josh Hopkins as Bill Griffin
- Jeffrey DeMunn as Mercer Haldane
- Anjelica Huston as President Castilla
- Rosemary Dunsmore as Nancy Langford
- Joris Jarsky as Tom Fancher
- Conrad Dunn as Ghalib Hassan
- Sergio Di Zio as Marty Zellerbach
- Karen Glave as Lt. Crowthers
