= The Icarus Agenda =

Novel by Robert Ludlum

- The Icarus Agenda first edition cover.
- Author: Robert Ludlum
- Language: English
- Genre: Thriller
- Publisher: Random House
- Publication date: February 22, 1988
- Publication place: United States
- Media type: Print (hardback & paperback)
- Pages: 677 pp (first edition)
- ISBN: 0-394-54397-1
- OCLC: 16901124
- Dewey Decimal: 813/.54 19
- LC Class: PS3562.U26 I24 1988b

The Icarus Agenda is a 1988 thriller novel by bestselling author Robert Ludlum. It is the sequel to The Chancellor Manuscript.

== Plot summary ==
A few years before, a tragic "accident" left him with 78 fewer friends. The only loved-one left was Emmanuel "Manny" Weingrass, a world-renowned architect and a somewhat impossible person. In his first year in Congress, there is an uprising in Masqat—a hostage taking. The events remind him of a man known as The Mahdi whom Weingrass said was the reason for the deaths of his 78 friends. He goes to Oman for revenge and comes back victorious. The Mahdi dead and a tragedy averted. A year later, the inheritors of Inver Brass—the resurrected group of influential people, destroyed in the events of the Chancellor Manuscript, who had been tracking him ever since he went on the Oman operation through a specially gifted computer specialist, exposes the truth of Kendrick being involved in Masqat and they reveal this to the world to have Kendrick as Vice President of the USA, because they consider him to be morally incorruptible. After the revealing, lives are lost and friendships broken, Kendrick is desperately looking for the people who are responsible for turning his life upside-down. But unknown to the Inver Brass there is a traitor in their midst. Codename Icarus is the last hope to a nation and to a world. The organisation was first mentioned in his 1977 novel The Chancellor Manuscript and is also mentioned in his later novel The Bancroft Strategy.

== Characters in "The Icarus Agenda" ==
- Evan Kendrick – US congressman and protagonist
- Emmanuel "Manny" Weingrass – architect
- The Mahdi
- The Sultan of Oman
- Khalehla

== Cultural references ==
- Harry Burns is reading this book in the film When Harry Met Sally... when Sally Albright calls him on the phone about her ex-boyfriend getting married.

== Publication history ==
- 1988, US, Random House ISBN 0-394-54397-1, Pub date February 22, 1988, Hardback
- 1988, US, Bantam Books ISBN 0-553-17326-X, Pub date March 1, 1988, Paperback
- 1988, UK, Grafton ISBN 0-246-12574-8 Pub date March 24, 1988, Hardback
- 1989, UK, Grafton ISBN 0-586-06455-9 Paperback
- 1998, UK, HarperCollins ISBN 0-586-06455-9, Pub date June 15, 1998, Paperback
