= The Parsifal Mosaic =

1982 novel by Robert Ludlum

- The Parsifal Mosaic first edition cover.
- Author: Robert Ludlum
- Language: English
- Genre: Spy novel
- Publisher: Random House
- Publication date: February 12, 1982
- Publication place: United States
- Media type: Print (Hardback & Paperback)
- Pages: 630 pp (first edition)
- ISBN: 0-394-52111-0
- OCLC: 8052537
- Dewey Decimal: 813/.54 19
- LC Class: PS3562.U26 P37

The Parsifal Mosaic is a spy fiction novel by Robert Ludlum published in 1982.

== Plot summary ==
Michael Havelock (an anglicized version of Mikhail Havlíček) is a naturalized Czech-American intelligence officer working for the "Consular Ops", the US State Department's black operations division. At the beginning of the novel he believes he has just witnessed the execution of his partner and the love of his life, Jenna Karas (anglicized version of Jana Karasova), along an isolated stretch of the Costa Brava. Jenna had been marked for execution because she was proved to be a KGB double agent.

He immediately leaves the intelligence world, something he had been considering doing for some time and goes sightseeing in areas he had previously visited. In Athens, Pyotr Rostov, a senior KGB officer, forces a meeting with Havelock. Rostov denies that Karas is an agent of theirs. Later, in Rome, Havelock sees Jenna alive at a train station. She flees him, frightened, and he pursues her.

He makes contact with a former source at the US consulate called Colonel Baylor, and begins his search for Jenna throughout several countries. Meanwhile, strategists for Consular Operations in the US government decide that he is a paranoid schizophrenic and must be terminated, lest he compromise entire networks across Europe. All the evidence available to them indicates that Karas was a double agent, and was successfully terminated on the Costa Brava. So one of them, "Red" Ogilvie sets up an ambush on the Palatine Hill in Rome with the intention of taking Michael in. However, the two mercenaries he hired are taken out by Michael, the gas grenade he uses only affects him when Michael lashes out, and after being convinced of Havelock's innocence, he ends up taking an accidental bullet from Colonel Baylor who was sent to kill Havelock.

Back in the United States, however, the US government has a problem of its own: Anton Matthias, the Secretary of State, acknowledged by the entire world as a genius and trusted with powers far beyond those his office allow him, has gone completely insane. Before anybody realized that he was insane, he negotiated treaties with parties he believed to be representing the Soviet Union and the People's Republic of China, each agreeing to a preemptive nuclear strike against the third party, but in fact with a man who identified himself as Parsifal. Parsifal demands a huge ransom to keep the documents from being released, thereby triggering a nuclear war. Once the ransom is paid, however, he does not touch it, having confirmed how desperate Washington is. Havelock, who as a child had been one of the few survivors of the massacre at Lidice, has a special bond with Matthias, a fellow Czech who had advised him in graduate school. Somehow Matthias's insanity is linked to the order to terminate Jenna Karas.

For her part, Karas has been told that Michael is a Russian spy and that he is trying to kill her. Consequently, she is not especially eager to meet him. When Michael finally traces Jenna to an isolated farm in Pennsylvania, they realize that they were both deceived and that each had been told that the other was an enemy. They then work together with the President of the United States, Charles Berquist, and several trusted advisors to find Parsifal and stop him.

They are opposed by Arthur Pierce, a brilliant and murderous Soviet mole highly placed in the State Department. Pierce has ordered the murders of the strategists of Consular Operations ( two of them are crushed by a bulldozer in their car and driven off a cliff and another is shot), and then a string of successive killings - all in his own quest to gain evidence of Matthias's insanity. Pierce is working not for the regular KGB, but the VKR (Voennaya Kontra Razvedka), a fanatical branch of Soviet intelligence identified as an offshoot of the OGPU. He is also, for that matter, a paminyatchik - an agent under deep cover, who has lived in the United States since infancy. For much of the novel, Pierce's true loyalties lie undiscovered. One of Havelock's allies, Undersecretary of State Emory Bradford, realizes that Pierce works for the VKR, but he is murdered by the ever-alert Pierce before he can warn anyone else. Pierce also solicits the murder of Rostov, who loathes the VKR and has tried to help Havelock.

When Michael finally finds Parsifal, a friend of Anton and a Soviet defector who is less fanatical than Arthur Pierce, he finds out that the documents were not produced to provoke nuclear war, but rather to demonstrate that no one man could be trusted with vast amounts of power. Pierce, however, has had his operatives murder Michael's bodyguards and breaks into Parsifal's house just as he agrees to burn the documents. However hearing that Rostov has been murdered, Parsifal decides to sacrifice himself by using his body to block Pierce's gun allowing Michael and Jenna time to get out. Michael and Jenna then kill Pierce's operatives by stabbing them and Michael then flanks Pierce and guns him down. They conclude that the documentary evidence of Matthias's insanity is best destroyed. Havelock tells Berquist of this; he is informed, in turn, that Matthias has just died. Finally safe, he and Jenna move to New England, where Havelock accepts an academic position.

== Characters in The Parsifal Mosaic ==
- Michael Havelock (b. Michal Havlíček), an exhausted and embittered veteran operative of Consular Operations. Born in interwar Czechoslovakia, Havlicek witnessed the murder of his entire village of Lidice by the Nazis. His father survived the war, only to disappear at the hands of the Soviets in 1948. Brought over to the United States, he proved an invaluable operative for US intelligence.
- Jenna Karas (b. Jana Karasová), Havelock's faithful partner and lover, and a capable agent in her own right. Her apparent death on the Costa Brava sets Havelock off; the revelation that she is still alive causes him to go rogue.
- Anthony Matthias (b. Anton Matthias), the brilliant, beloved American Secretary of State. Matthias has a close bond to Havelock, who was once his graduate student. The strain of his exalted status, as well as his own ego, drive Matthias over the edge.
- Pyotr Rostov, the KGB's Director of External Strategies. Rostov is a dedicated director of the KGB, but despises the fanatical VKR. He first seeks to investigate Havelock's departure from Consular Operations and then offers him the opportunity to defect.
- Emory Bradford, a controversial but brilliant Undersecretary of State. Bradford, once a renowned hawk in the Kennedy and Johnson years, became a convinced dove once he realized the damage caused by Vietnam. When the President was faced with Parsifal's demands, he turned to Bradford as an invaluable counsellor.
- President Charles Berquist. Berquist, who hails from rural Minnesota is a deeply intelligent man, but nonetheless is caught off guard by Matthias's actions and the presence of a mole in the State Department.
- Arthur Pierce (b. Nikolai Petrovich Malyekov), the highest ranking paminyatchik in the State Department. Utterly fanatical and utterly ruthless, Pierce has an outwardly impeccable record, including valiant service in Vietnam. He is dead set on obtaining Parsifal's evidence and using it to bring America to its knees. His strategic cunning and the assistance of fellow paminyatchiki make him one of Ludlum's most fearsome villains.
- Parsifal, a mysterious figure who has somehow collaborated with Anton Matthias to bring the world to the edge of catastrophe.

== Major themes ==
The Parsifal Mosaic is the one Ludlum novel focused entirely upon the Cold War, and upon the possibility of nuclear war. Other novels such as The Matarese Circle and The Aquitaine Progression use the Cold War as a backdrop, but do not focus on it to the same degree.

Anton Matthias, the much revered Secretary of State, bears some resemblance to Henry Kissinger. Both men are immigrants to the United States, and both have an advanced academic background. While Kissinger was not nearly this revered, he did accumulate great amounts of unchecked power. Like Parsifal, Ludlum was deeply fearful of the concentration of power.

The Parsifal Mosaic conveys Ludlum's general loathing of fanaticism. Havelock's life journey is haunted by the actions of fanatics, from the village of Lidice, to the Costa Brava. The novel frequently reminds readers of this early part of his life: while searching for Jenna he encounters first an escaped Nazi war criminal, and then a man who has constructed a concentration camp in rural Pennsylvania. As he dispatches Arthur Pierce, Havelock remarks that it was people like him who forced him to live in the forest.

== In other media ==
=== Film adaptation ===
Ron Howard has been attached by Universal Pictures to direct the film adaption of The Parsifal Mosaic, according to Variety. David Self was in charge of adapting the book to screenplay. In 2014, director Zhang Yimou (director of Hero, House of Flying Daggers, The Flowers of War) was in talks to direct the adaptation of the book. On May 16, 2016, Universal and Captivate Entertainment announced the film adaptation would be a part of a cinematic universe of Robert Ludlum adaptations with the following: The Janson Directive, The Sigma Protocol, Covert One and crossover films.

=== Television series ===
On September 24, 2026, it was reported that Legendary Entertainment was developing a series starring Sam Worthington and Sofia Carson for Hulu.

== Publication history ==
- 1982, US, Random House ISBN 0-394-52111-0, Pub date February 12, 1982, Hardback
- 1983, US, Bantam Books ISBN 0-553-19951-X, Pub date February 1, 1983, Paperback
- 1982, UK, Grafton ISBN 0-246-11417-7 Pub date March 25, 1982, Hardback
- 2002, UK, HarperCollins ISBN 0-586-05276-3, Pub date April 15, 2002, Paperback
