= Covert-One series =

Series of novels

Covert-One
- Author: Robert Ludlum (main), Gayle Lynds, Philip Shelby, Patrick Larkin, James H Cobb, Kyle Mills, Jamie Freveletti
- Country: United States
- Language: English
- Genre: Thriller
- Published: 2000 – present
- No. of books: 12

The Covert-One series is a sequence of thriller novels initially by Robert Ludlum, and penned by several other authors after his death. The books feature a team of political and technical experts, belonging to a top-secret U.S. agency called Covert-One, who fight corruption, conspiracy, and bioweaponry at the highest levels of society.

== List of books ==
1. The Hades Factor (with Gayle Lynds) (2000)
2. The Cassandra Compact (with Phillip Shelby) (2001)
3. The Paris Option (with Gayle Lynds) (2002)
4. The Altman Code (with Gayle Lynds) (2003)
5. The Lazarus Vendetta (with Patrick Larkin) (2004)
6. The Moscow Vector (with Patrick Larkin) (2005)
7. The Arctic Event (by James H. Cobb) (2007)
8. The Ares Decision (by Kyle Mills) (2011)
9. The Janus Reprisal (by Jamie Freveletti) (2012)
10. The Utopia Experiment (by Kyle Mills) (2013)
11. The Geneva Strategy (by Jamie Freveletti) (2015)
12. The Patriot Attack (by Kyle Mills) (2015)

== Characters ==
- Lieutenant Colonel Dr. Jonathan "Jon" Jackson Smith, M.D.: Jon Smith was born and raised in Council Bluffs, Iowa, graduated from the University of Iowa, and attended medical school at the University of California at Los Angeles. His career is varied—a military doctor in MASH units, operative in military intelligence, and a troop commander. During the First Gulf War, he was a battlefield surgeon, and he served a short time in Somalia. In the opening book of the series, The Hades Factor, he is a research scientist with USAMRIID, the U.S. Army Medical Research Institute of Infectious Diseases, located at Fort Detrick, Maryland. During his time there, he became engaged to another research scientist, Sophia Russell, who is murdered in The Hades Factor. At the end of the first novel, he's approached to join a brand-new, independent, highly secret agency called Covert-One.
- Randi Russell: Randi is the younger sister of Dr. Sophia Russell, Smith's fiancée. She is a skilled operative working for the CIA, and is often seconded by Covert-One to assist Smith in his endeavors. In many cases, it is by simple chance that she encounters Jon Smith. She is known to resent Smith for his failure to save her fiancé, a major in the U.S. Army, and also for failing to save her sister Sophia. In The Arctic Event, the head of Covert-One flags Randi as a possible recruit for his agency, finally taking her in during The Ares Decision.
- Martin "Marty" Joseph Zellerbach: Marty is a computer expert with Asperger syndrome. He is very helpful in The Hades Factor, The Paris Option, and The Utopia Experiment. He also makes a short appearance in The Ares Decision and The Janus Reprisal.
- Peter Howell: Howell is a British national, a former-Special Air Service officer and known for working with a number of intelligence agencies, including the CIA and MI6. He is an old friend of Jon Smith's, appearing in six novels, but absent from The Altman Code, The Moscow Vector, The Arctic Event, and The Utopia Experiment. He has a secluded home in the U.S., which contains a command center and a sizeable armory. Like Randi Russell, Howell usually encounters Smith purely by chance, except in The Hades Factor and The Ares Decision, where he is recruited by Smith for a mission.
- Nathaniel Frederick "Fred" Klein: An obscure government agent with experience with the CIA and the Pentagon, Fred Klein is selected by President Sam Castilla to set up Covert-One, after the devastating effects of Victor Tremont's Hades Project. Klein is an extremely secretive man, and almost nothing is known about him. He often counsels the president directly, advising him on what to do.
- Samuel Adams "Sam" Castilla: Castilla is the President of the United States in all Covert-One novels, an experienced and wise diplomat and politician. After he and his numerous intelligence agencies failed to prevent the Hades Project before it killed thousands, Castilla orders Fred Klein, an old college friend, to set up Covert-One, an elite agency and the personal action arm of Castilla, to combat such national security threats. Though several have their suspicions, Castilla is the only man outside of Covert-One who knows of its existence.
- Maggie Templeton: Ex-CIA, she is Fred Klein's sister-in-law and secretary, executive assistant and second in charge of Covert-One. She first appears in The Cassandra Compact.
- Major General Oleg Kirov: Kirov is a former officer of the KGB, a self-proclaimed 'new Russian', who now operates as a senior intelligence officer at the Federal Security Service. Kirov appears in The Cassandra Compact, and also in The Moscow Vector. In both cases, he assists Lieutenant Colonel Smith in succeeding, even though in his second appearance, the enemy Smith is fighting is Kirov's own government.
- Professor Valentina Metrace: Metrace is a professor of warfare at Cambridge University, who is a special weapons expert and a skillful Covert-One agent. Her only appearance is in The Arctic Event.
- Star: Star is the newest member of Covert-One, a former librarian in her thirties with massive computer skills.
- Andreas Beckmann: A German national who is an acquaintance of Peter Howell. He first appeared in The Janus Reprisal.

== Adaptations ==
In April 2006, CBS aired a miniseries based on The Hades Factor. The miniseries was directed by British director Mick Jackson.

In 2008, Swordfish Studios was contracted to create a Covert-One video game, but lost the license before they could release it. The game came out on February 24, 2009, retooled as 50 Cent: Blood on the Sand.

On May 16, 2016, Universal Studios and Captivate Entertainment announced that a film adaptation will be part of a cinematic universe of Robert Ludlum adaptations including The Janson Directive, The Sigma Protocol, The Parsifal Mosaic, and others.
