= Survivor (film) =

- Theatrical release poster
- Directed by: James McTeigue
- Written by: Philip Shelby
- Produced by: Charles Winkler; Irwin Winkler; Matt O'Toole; Les Weldon
- Starring: Milla Jovovich; Pierce Brosnan; Angela Bassett; Roger Rees; Antonia Thomas; James D'Arcy; Frances de la Tour; Genevieve O'Reilly; Dylan McDermott; Robert Forster
- Cinematography: Danny Ruhlmann
- Edited by: Kate Baird
- Music by: Ilan Eshkeri
- Production companies: Millennium Films; Chartoff-Winkler Productions; Winkler Films
- Distributed by: Alchemy (United States); Lionsgate (United Kingdom)
- Release dates: May 29, 2015 (United States); June 5, 2015 (United Kingdom)
- Running time: 96 minutes
- Countries: United States; United Kingdom
- Language: English
- Budget: $20 million
- Box office: $3.8 million

Survivor is a 2015 action spy thriller film directed by James McTeigue and written by Philip Shelby. The film stars Milla Jovovich, Pierce Brosnan, Dylan McDermott, Robert Forster, Angela Bassett, Antonia Thomas, James D'Arcy, Frances de la Tour, Genevieve O'Reilly, and – in his last ever film role – Roger Rees.

The film was released in cinemas in the United Kingdom on June 5, 2015, and direct-to-video in the United States on June 23, 2015.

== Plot ==
During a firefight in the Middle East, American soldier Johnny Talbot is captured by Islamic terrorists and forced to witness the execution of his comrade, Ray.

Kate Abbott is a Diplomatic Security Service agent working for the American Embassy in London, who began working in the government after most of her friends were killed in 9/11. While she is implementing new, more stringent rules for visa applications of potential terrorist suspects, most of her team are killed by a bomb explosion while at a restaurant for the birthday of their superior, Bill Talbot. Bill is Johnny's father, and is being blackmailed under threat of Johnny's death. He delayed attending the party to return to his desk to delete records of the visas he has approved for terrorists entering the United States.

Kate survives the bombing when she leaves the restaurant to get a last-minute present for Bill. As she flees from the perpetrator, she is attacked by Bill, unintentionally killing him in self-defense. Kate is later considered, through witnesses and footage, the prime suspect for the attacks at the embassy.

An investigation into the attack reveals that the bomb has traces of chromium, leading her superior at the embassy, Sam Parker, to deduce that the perpetrator was the 'Watchmaker', one of the world's most wanted killers, known for his precision work, who detonated a bomb with similar traces in Paris two years earlier. Nobody knows the Watchmaker's appearance, as he has had lots of plastic surgery over the years.

Sam Parker, who believes in her innocence, is injured in an attack by the Watchmaker. Kate is forced to sneak back into the embassy to create false passports for herself to follow the Watchmaker to New York, with continuing support from Sam and her friend Sally, the only two people who still believe in her innocence. Kate's subsequent efforts uncover a plan to detonate another bomb at Times Square in New York City during the New Year's Eve celebrations.

Meanwhile, the Watchmaker uses a Steyr HS .50 cal sniper rifle to fire an incendiary round into a sphere filled with explosive gas atop a vacant block of apartments in Tower Hamlets. The building is devastated. Later, the Watchmaker reveals that he is aware of his client's motivation for the Times Square attack. Dr Emil Balan intends to avenge his late wife's death when her visa to the U.S. was delayed and she did not receive emergency medical treatment in time, while his partner Pavlou intends to bet against the stock market and make millions when the stock market reopens. The Watchmaker demands half the profits, threatening to cancel the attack.

In New York, Balan coordinates filling the New Year's Eve ball with explosive gas. The Watchmaker's job is to shoot the sphere and ignite the gas. Balan meets the Watchmaker on top of a high rise a few blocks from Times Square. The Watchmaker kills Balan, removing any connection back to him. Kate deduces the plot and finds the Watchmaker, moments away from triggering the bomb. After a struggle, she manages to throw the Watchmaker off the side of the building. He falls to his death on the stroke of midnight.

Her suspicion about Balan's guilt is vindicated and her name is cleared. She receives a call from Sam, who has recovered from recent injuries, congratulating her.

== Cast ==
- Milla Jovovich as Katherine "Kate" Abbott, a Diplomatic Security Service Special Agent/Assistant RSO at the US Embassy in London.
- Pierce Brosnan as Nash, a notorious assassin, known as the Watchmaker.
- Angela Bassett as Maureen Crane, the United States Ambassador to the United Kingdom.
- Dylan McDermott as Sam Parker, Diplomatic Security Service Special Agent/Senior RSO and Abbott's superior at the US Embassy in London.
- Frances de la Tour as Sally, the analyst of the US Embassy in London.
- Robert Forster as Bill Talbot, a senior United States Foreign Service officer at the US Embassy in London.
- Roger Rees as Dr. Emil Balan, a scientist specialising in combustible gases. This was Rees's final role before his death.
- Benno Fürmann as Pavlou, a powerful and unscrupulous businessman.
- James D'Arcy as Inspector Paul Anderson, a Counter Terrorism Command officer in the Metropolitan Police Service.
- Genevieve O'Reilly as Lisa Carr, a photographer and close friend of Abbott.

Regé-Jean Page, Antonia Thomas, Jing Lusi and Sean Teale play Kate's colleagues in the visa team: Robert Purvell, Naomi Rosenbaum, Joyce Su and Alvin Murdock. Sonya Cassidy appears as Anderson's right hand, Helen.

Paddy Wallace and Parker Sawyers play Johnny Talbot and Ray, two US soldiers in the film's opening scene, while Ben Starr appears as a sniper.

== Production ==
The principal photography of the film Survivor began on January 20, 2014 in London. Shooting took place in London for five weeks before production moved to Sofia, Bulgaria for three weeks. Emma Thompson was cast and appeared in promotional material for the film, but she pulled out at the last minute.

== Cinema and home media release ==
Alchemy acquired the United States distribution rights to the film on March 20, 2015. The film was given a limited release and a video on demand release in the United States on May 29, 2015. Lionsgate released the film in the United Kingdom on June 5, 2015.

Survivor was released on DVD and Blu-ray in the US on June 23, 2015, and was released in Canada and other countries on July 7, 2015.

== Reception ==
Survivor received almost uniformly negative reviews from major reviewers. On review aggregator Rotten Tomatoes, the film holds an approval rating of 8% based on 52 reviews, with an average rating of 3.65/10. The website's critics consensus reads: "Borrowing heavily from better films in service of a predictable story, Survivor will struggle to sustain the interest of even the most avid action thriller fans." IGN awarded Survivor 5 out of 10, saying "The film is particularly disappointing as McTeigue also directed V for Vendetta, a much sharper, much more intriguing, much more thought-provoking look at our post-9/11 world." As of September 2015, the film had a score 26 out of 100 from 11 critics on Metacritic, with the highest coming in from Roger Moore at Movie Nation and Peter Sobczynski of Roger Ebert (both at 50 points on a scale of 100).

The film received rare positive reviews—e.g., from The National (Abu Dhabi).
