= Leslie S. Klinger =

American attorney and writer (born 1946)

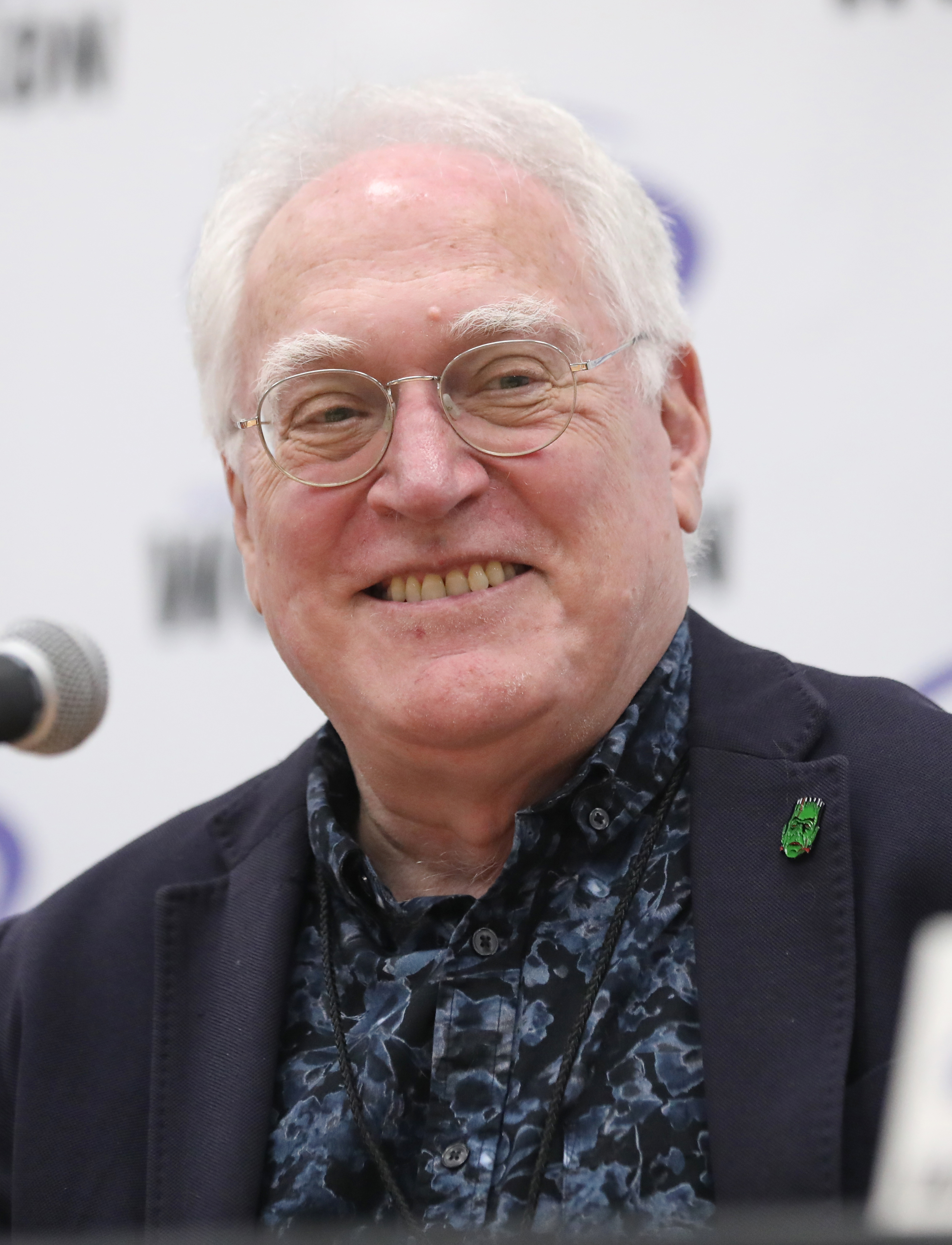
- Klinger at the 2024 WonderCon
- Born: Chicago, Illinois, U.S.
- Education: University of California, Berkeley (B.A. in English); UC Berkeley School of Law (J.D.)
- Occupations: lawyer, writer

Leslie S. Klinger is an American attorney and writer. He is a noted literary editor and annotator of classic genre fiction, including the Sherlock Holmes stories and the novels Dracula, Frankenstein, and Strange Case of Dr. Jekyll and Mr. Hyde as well as Neil Gaiman's The Sandman comics, Alan Moore's and Dave Gibbons's graphic novel Watchmen, the stories of H.P. Lovecraft, and Neil Gaiman's American Gods.

== Biography ==
Klinger received a B.A. in English from the University of California, Berkeley and a J.D. from Boalt Hall School of Law at UC Berkeley. It was in law school that he developed his interest in Holmes, leading him to amass a collection of thousands of books about the detective. Klinger also has a substantial collection of pre-World War I crime fiction. As well as being an author and scholar, Klinger practices law.

== Publications ==
He is the editor of The New Annotated Sherlock Holmes, a three-book edition of all of Arthur Conan Doyle's Sherlock Holmes fiction with extensive annotations and an introduction by John le Carré. Hailed as "the definitive exegesis of Holmes and his times," the book won an Edgar Award. He also edited the scholarly ten-volume Sherlock Holmes Reference Library, a heavily annotated edition of the entire Sherlock Holmes canon, and The New Annotated Dracula, an annotated version of Bram Stoker's novel with an introduction by Neil Gaiman. In 2011, he co-edited with Laurie R. King The Grand Game, a two-volume collection of classical Sherlockian scholarship published by the Baker Street Irregulars, and A Study in Sherlock, a collection of stories by all-star writers inspired by the Sherlock Holmes tales (Random House). Klinger and King edited another collection, In the Company of Sherlock Holmes, with more stories by great writers inspired by the Holmes canon, published by Pegasus Books in 2014. Klinger also wrote a short story, "The Closing," for that collection, his first fiction to be published in book form. Klinger and King edited a third volume of stories for Pegasus, published in 2016 and entitled Echoes of Sherlock Holmes; their fourth collection, titled For the Sake of the Game, was published by Pegasus in 2018. The fifth volume, titled In League with Sherlock Holmes, was published by Pegasus in 2020.

The first two volumes of The Annotated Sandman, a four-volume edition of Neil Gaiman's award-winning The Sandman comics for DC Comics, appeared in 2012; the third volume was published in 2014, and the fourth volume appeared in 2015. Watchmen: The Annotated Edition was edited by Klinger for DC Comics with Dave Gibbons, using extensive material from Alan Moore's original scripts; the book was published in late 2017.

Klinger also edited The New Annotated H.P. Lovecraft, a massive illustrated collection of heavily annotated stories with an introduction by Alan Moore for Liveright/W. W. Norton, was published in 2014. A second annotated volume of Lovecraft tales, titled The New Annotated H.P. Lovecraft: Beyond Arkham, with an introduction by Victor LaValle, was published by Liveright in 2019. A single-volume trade paperback edition of 10 stories, The Call of Cthulhu and Other Stories, including Klinger's notes, was published by Liveright in 2022, and a second volume of 10 stories with notes, titled At the Mountains of Madness and Other Tales of Weird Science, with an introduction by Tamsyn Muir, was published in 2026. The latter was recorded as an audiobook with an introduction and audio endnotes read by Klinger. The New Annotated Frankenstein, also from Liveright/W. W. Norton with an introduction by Guillermo del Toro, was published in 2017. In 2024, he wrote and recorded introductions for Audible's The Essential Lovecraft, a collection of 48 stories.

Klinger has also contributed introductions to numerous books of mystery and horror, written book reviews for the Los Angeles Times, Los Angeles Review of Books and other periodicals, and contributed an essay on vampires and sex, called "Love Bites," to Playboy. A collection of all of his essays from 2007 through 2016, titled "Baker Street Reveries," appeared in 2018 from Wessex Press. He served as a consultant on the 2009 film Sherlock Holmes, starring Robert Downey, Jr., and on the sequel, Sherlock Holmes: A Game of Shadows, released in 2011, as well as Enola Holmes and the sequel film, the television series Watson (TV series) for CBS-TV, and a number of other film and television scripts, books, and comic book adaptations of the Holmes and Dracula stories.

In 2011, Klinger edited two collections of classic fiction, In the Shadow of Dracula and In the Shadow of Sherlock Holmes, both from IDW. In 2015, a third collection, In the Shadow of Edgar Allan Poe: Classic Horror, 1810-1916, was published by Pegasus Books. A fourth volume, In the Shadow of Agatha Christie: Classic Crime Fiction by Forgotten Women Authors, 1850-1917, was published by Pegasus in 2018, and a fifth collection, Ghost Stories: Classic Tales of Horror and Suspense, co-edited with Lisa Morton, came out in 2019. A second volume co-edited with Morton, Weird Women: Classic Supernatural Fiction by Groundbreaking Female Writers, 1852-1923, was published in 2020. A third volume, Weird Women 2: Classic Supernatural Fiction by Groundbreaking Female Writers, 1820-1945, was published in 2021, and a fourth volume, Haunted Tales, appeared in 2022. In 2018, Pegasus Books published Classic American Crime Fiction of the 1920s, which includes House Without a Key (the first Charlie Chan novel by Earl Derr Biggers), Red Harvest (the first novel-length Continental Op mystery by Dashiell Hammett), The Roman Hat Mystery (the first Ellery Queen novel), The Benson Murder Case (the first Philo Vance novel by S.S. Van Dine), and Little Caesar by W.R. Burnett, the basis for the first great gangster film.

Klinger, together with Laura Caldwell, who was a well-known writer and law professor at Loyola University Chicago and founder-director of Life After Innocence, edited an anthology, titled Anatomy of Innocence: Testimonies of the Wrongfully Convicted, published by Liveright/W. W. Norton in 2017. The anthology tells the stories of exonerees—individuals wrongfully incarcerated for crimes they did not commit—as told to major mystery and thriller writers. The volume is introduced by Scott Turow and Barry Scheck and also contains a previously unpublished essay by the renowned playwright Arthur Miller on a wrongful conviction case. All authors' proceeds will be donated to Life After Innocence.

In 2020, Annotated American Gods by Neil Gaiman and Klinger—a fully annotated and illustrated edition of Gaiman's multi-award-winning 2000 novel American Gods, was published . His next major book, New Annotated Strange Case of Dr. Jekyll & Mr. Hyde by Robert Louis Stevenson, with an introduction by Joe Hill, was published in 2022 by the Mysterious Press. He is currently working on an annotated collection of work of Lord Dunsany, co-edited by Guillermo del Toro.

Klinger also served as general editor of the Haunted Library of Horror Classics, co-edited with Eric J. Guignard and published by the Horror Writers Association and Poisoned Pen Press/Sourcebooks. The series consisted of Phantom of the Opera by Gaston Leroux, followed by The Beetle by Richard Marsh, Vathek by William Beckford, House on the Borderlands by William Hope Hodgson, Of One Blood by Pauline Hopkins, The Parasite and Other Tales of Terror by Arthur Conan Doyle, The King in Yellow by Robert W. Chambers, Ghost Stories of an Antiquarian by M.R. James, Gothic Classics: The Castle of Otranto and The Old English Baron by Horace Walpole and Clara Reeve, and The Mummy! by Jane Webb.

He is also the editor of the ongoing Library of Congress Crime Classics series, published by the Poisoned Pen Press/Sourcebooks in partnership with the Library of Congress. The first book in the series is That Affair Next Door by Anna Katharine Green. This was followed by The Rat Began to Gnaw the Rope by C.W. Grafton, Case Pending by Dell Shannon, Final Proof by Rodrigues Ottolengui, Last Seen Wearing by Hillary Waugh, The Silent Bullet by Arthur B. Reeve, The Dead Letter by Seeley Regester, Jim Hanvey, Detective by Octavus Roy Cohen, The Metropolitan Opera Murders by Helen Traubel, The Conjure-Man Dies by Rudolph Fisher, Average Jones by Samuel Hopkins Adams, Room to Swing by Ed Lacy, The Master of Mysteries by Gelett Burgess, A Gentle Murderer by Dorothy Salisbury Davis, The Thinking Machine by Jacques Futrelle, The "Canary" Murder Case by S. S. Van Dine, In the Fog by Richard Harding Davis, V as in Victim by Lawrence Treat, To Catch a Thief by David Dodge (novelist), Uncle Abner by Melville Davisson Post, Florentine Finish by Cornelius Hirschberg, Detective Duff Unravels It by Harvey J. O'Higgins, The Cannibal Who Overate by Hugh Pentecost, Judson Philips, The Invisible Host by Gwen Bristow and Bruce Manning, The Patient in Room 18 by Mignon Eberhart, The Dain Curse by Dashiell Hammett, and People against O'Hara by Eleazar Lipsky.

== Literary organizations ==
Klinger is a member of the Sherlock Holmes literary club called The Baker Street Irregulars, as well as numerous other Sherlockian societies such as The Illustrious Clients of Indianapolis. He served three terms as chapter president of the Southern California chapter of the Mystery Writers of America from 2006 to 2009 and is again serving in that role and on the National Board. He is a member of Sisters in Crime, the Horror Writers Association (and served as the Treasurer of HWA), the Dracula Society, and the Transylvanian Society of Dracula. He is an honorary member of the Mystery Writers of Turkey and currently serves on the editorial board of the Journal of Dracula Studies. Klinger is the chair of the Board of Trustees of the American Friends of the Toronto Public Library and a trustee of the Shirley Jackson Awards, Inc..

He was the general editor of a number of books published by the Baker Street Irregulars (BSI), including the Manuscript Series, and is currently the general editor of the BSI's Biography Series and serves as "Buttons," a senior officer of the BSI. He has lectured frequently on Holmes, Dracula, Lovecraft, Frankenstein, Jekyll and Hyde, and the Victorian world and has taught a number of courses for UCLA Extension on Sherlock Holmes. He also taught a course on "Dracula and His World" for UCLA Extension in November 2009. Klinger has also moderated or appeared on many panels for the Los Angeles Times Festival of Books.

== Lawsuit against Conan Doyle Estate Ltd ==
In February 2013, Klinger filed a copyright lawsuit against Conan Doyle Estate Ltd, a UK-based private company which had demanded a license fee for the use of the Sherlock Holmes characters in the In the Company of Sherlock Holmes short story collection. In the United States in 2013, only ten of Conan Doyle's sixty original Sherlock Holmes stories were in copyright, and the proposed stories relied only on aspects of the characters defined in public domain stories (such as Holmes's bohemian habits, deductive reasoning, and many supporting characters).

In December 2013, Judge Rubén Castillo ruled that stories published prior to 1923 were in the public domain but that ten stories published after then were still under copyright. The stories in the public domain consist of the four novels and 46 short stories. Judge Castillo rejected a claim by Conan Doyle Estate Ltd. that some aspects of Holmes in the pre-1923 stories were protected by copyright because they were "continually developed" through the protected ten stories, which would not enter the public domain until 2022. Any author or creator is free to use characters and events in the pre-1923 stories, including Holmes and Watson themselves, but elements introduced in the copyrighted stories, such as Watson's rugby background with Blackheath and details of Holmes' retirement, remain protected by copyright law. In June 2014, in an opinion by Judge Richard Posner, the United States Court of Appeals for the Seventh Circuit affirmed the lower court decision in favor of Klinger and confirmed the public-domain status of the pre-1923 material. In November 2014, the U.S. Supreme Court refused to hear a further appeal by Conan Doyle Estate Ltd, making the Court of Appeals' finding final.

== Awards ==
Klinger's awards for his editorial work include:

1999:

- "Special Sherlock" (best Sherlockian book of the year) for "Adventures of Sherlock Holmes," Sherlock Holmes Reference Library, Vol. 1 (Sherlock Holmes: The Detective Magazine)

2003:

- "Special Sherlock" (best Sherlockian book of the year) for "The Hound of the Baskervilles," Sherlock Holmes Reference Library, Vol. 4 (Sherlock Holmes: The Detective Magazine)

2005:

- Edgar Award for "Best Critical/Biographical Work" for "The New Annotated Sherlock Holmes: The Complete Short Stories," 2-vol. set (Mystery Writers of America)
- Macavity Award Nominated for "Best Nonfiction" for "The New Annotated Sherlock Holmes: The Complete Short Stories," 2-vol. set (Mystery Readers International)
- Anthony Award Nominated for "Best Nonfiction" for "The New Annotated Sherlock Holmes: The Complete Short Stories," 2-vol. set (Bouchercon World Mystery Convention)
- Agatha Award Nominated for "Best Nonfiction" for "The New Annotated Sherlock Holmes: The Complete Short Stories," 2-vol. set (Malice Domestic Convention)
- Quill Award Nominated in the Mystery/Thriller category for "The New Annotated Sherlock Holmes: The Complete Short Stories," 2-vol. set (Quills Foundation)

2006:

- Edgar Award Nominated for "Best Critical/Biographical Work" for "The New Annotated Sherlock Holmes: The Novels"
- Macavity Award Nominated for "Best Nonfiction" for "The New Annotated Sherlock Holmes: The Novels"
- Anthony Award Nominated for "Best Nonfiction" for "The New Annotated Sherlock Holmes: The Novels"
- Agatha Award Nominated for "Best Nonfiction" for "The New Annotated Sherlock Holmes: The Novels"

2012:

- Bram Stoker Award Nominated for "Best Nonfiction" for "The Annotated Sandman, Vol. 1" (Horror Writers Association)

2014:

- Bram Stoker Award Nominated for "Best Nonfiction" for "The New Annotated H.P. Lovecraft" (Horror Writers Association)

2015:

- Anthony Award for Best Anthology for "In the Company of Sherlock Holmes: Stories Inspired by the Holmes Canon," co-edited with Laurie R. King (Bouchercon World Mystery Convention)
- Silver Falchion Award for Best Anthology for "In the Company of Sherlock Holmes: Stories Inspired by the Holmes Canon," co-edited with Laurie R. King (Killer Nashville Mystery Convention)

2017:

- Silver Falchion Award Nominated for Best Anthology for "Echoes of Sherlock Holmes: Stories Inspired by the Holmes Canon," co-edited with Laurie R. King (Killer Nashville Mystery Convention)

2018:

- World Fantasy Award Nominated for Special Award—Professional for "The New Annotated Frankenstein" (World Fantasy Convention)

2019:

- Morley-Montgomery Award for best article in the "Baker Street Journal" (2018) (The Baker Street Irregulars)
- Edgar Award for "Best Critical/Biographical Work" for "Classic American Crime Fiction of the 1920s" (Mystery Writers of America)
- Anthony Award Nominated for Best Critical/Non-fiction for "Classic American Crime Fiction of the 1920s" (Bouchercon World Mystery Convention)
- Silver Falchion Award Nominated for Best Anthology for "For the Sake of the Game: Stories Inspired by the Sherlock Holmes Canon," co-edited with Laurie R. King (Killer Nashville Mystery Convention)
- Silver Falchion Award Nominated for Best Nonfiction for "Classic American Crime Fiction of the 1920s" (Killer Nashville Mystery Convention)
- Macavity Award Nominated for Best Nonfiction for "Classic American Crime Fiction of the 1920s" (Mystery Readers International)

2020:

- World Fantasy Award Nominated for Special Award—Professional for "The New Annotated H.P. Lovecraft: Beyond Arkham" (World Fantasy Convention)
