= The Gemini Contenders =

1976 novel by Robert Ludlum

- The Gemini Contenders first edition cover.
- Author: Robert Ludlum
- Language: English
- Genre: Crime novel
- Publisher: Dial Press
- Publication date: 1976
- Publication place: United States
- Media type: Print (Hardback & Paperback)
- Pages: 438 pp (first edition)
- ISBN: 0-385-27273-1
- OCLC: 316213902

The Gemini Contenders is a 1976 novel by Robert Ludlum.

== Plot introduction ==
At the start of World War II a train departs from Salonika and heads for the Italian Alps, carrying a mysterious cargo. Over the next four decades, various members of the wealthy Italian Fontini-Cristi family, and a small brotherhood of priests with the name Xenope, struggle to locate and control the deadly secret cargo.

== Plot summary ==
=== The Train from Salonika ===
In 1939, Savarone Fontini-Cristi is the padrone of an immensely wealthy and powerful Italian family. At this time, the Order of Xenope, a secretive Greek monastic brotherhood, possesses ancient religious manuscripts, some of which, if authentic, are considered to be of enough significance to shatter the Christian religion. The Order of Xenope knows that the Nazis and Italian Fascists are seeking these long-rumored documents, and so must hide them. Because of his stature as a man of unsurpassed integrity, the Order entrusts the custody of these holiest of relics to Fontini-Cristi. Savarone schedules the circuitous shipment by train from Salonika, through Yugoslavia and Italy, and finally into the Alps. If the contents of the shipment are discovered at any time, the consequences are explosive.

=== The Executions ===
Though extremely wealthy, Savarone Fontini-Cristi has grown to abhor the Fascist regime of Benito Mussolini. He actively supports the partigiani, the disorganized Communist opposition to Mussolini. Savarone's involvement with the train from Salonika becomes known to the powerful Roman Catholic Cardinal, Donatti, who must have the hidden documents at any cost.

Incorrectly believing that Savarone has shared the secret location of the vault containing the documents with his first-born son, 36-year-old playboy Vittorio, Cardinal Donatti orders the execution of the entire Fontini-Cristi family at the family compound Campo di Fiori, just outside Milan. The family's massacre by an execution squad, consisting of German soldiers overseen by Donatti, is secretly witnessed by Vittorio, who can hardly believe the horror - father, mother, brothers, wives, children - all murdered in front of his eyes.

=== World War II ===
To Vittorio Fontini-Cristi's surprise, the British take extraordinary steps to evacuate Vittorio from Italy, expecting that he will tell them of the vault's location. Unfortunately for them, he doesn't know anything about the train from Salonika or its contents.

The British take advantage of Vittorio's business skills during World War II, establishing a covert network of displaced European professionals, whose purpose is to discreetly sabotage the business processes of the German war machine: Shipping fiascos and printing mistakes, resulting in mild chaos in the back office of the war effort. The British decided to anglicize his name to Victor Fontine. Throughout the war, periodic incidents arise related to the hidden documents that put Victor's life, and the life of Jane, his new-found bride, in danger. In June 1942, in the midst of a German bombing related to the vault, Jane gives birth to twins, whom she calls her Geminis. Victor vows that, immediately after the war, he will put the mystery of Salonika behind him, and convince his pursuers that he knows nothing about it.

At the war's end, he returns to Campo di Fiori, site of the execution grounds, where he hopes to end his involvement with the documents. After barely escaping with his life, he is met at the gates by five zealous priests, including the despised Cardinal Donatti. Proclaiming for the hundredth time that his father never told him about the train, Donatti orders Victor to be tortured until he confesses. Since Victor knows nothing, the priests torture him by breaking every single bone in his body, finally administering the last rites, and leaving him to die.

=== 1973 ===
Having barely survived the torture, Victor sells all of his holdings in Italy and establishes an extremely successful post-war consulting business in America. His twin sons, Adrian and Andrew, have grown up with privilege, with Adrian attending Princeton and Harvard Law, while Andrew, a West Point graduate, is a Major in the Vietnam War.

The sons are on opposite sides of the Vietnam War, but Andrew has grown into a sociopathic man, for whom the end justifies the means. Adrian is on the verge of exposing some of the crimes that his brother, and his cabal of elite officers, have committed.

At the same time, Victor is alarmed to learn that the train from Salonika has leaped through the past 30 years in the form of one of the zealous priests, who vows that Victor knows where the documents are and that he will force Victor to tell him. Remembering comments and gestures by his murdered father, the 70-year-old Victor travels back to Campo de' Fiori, and discovers key clues to the vault's location. The priest observes Victor's discovery, and attempts to pick up the torture where it was left off back in 1945. Badly injured, Victor returns to America to charge his Geminis with the responsibility of locating the hidden documents, realizing only that the sons have grown apart, but not that Andrew should not have such crucial information to be used for ill purposes.

Killing anyone who gets in his way, Andrew pursues the Salonika documents, leaving Adrian far behind. Adrian knows his brother's nature, and that he cannot be allowed to have the documents that could cause the collapse of Christianity, and the worldwide chaos that would ensue.

=== Brother vs. brother ===
In Champoluc a little town in the Aosta Valley, Adrian catches up with the murderous Andrew just as Andrew discovers the vault. In a monumental struggle, Adrian righteously triumphs over his evil twin brother, leaving Adrian to have the documents interpreted and to decide what to do with them.

=== The Documents ===
A parchment was taken from a Roman prison cell in the year 65 A.D. It is a letter supposedly written by a prisoner named Simon Bethsaida, renamed Peter by Jesus. In the letter, the author claims that Jesus Christ did not die on the cross, but instead another prisoner was substituted. Jesus allegedly committed suicide three days after the incident.

== Characters ==
- Savarone Fontini-Cristi – padrone of an Italian family
- Donatti – Roman Catholic Cardinal
- Vittorio Fontini-Cristi – 1st son to Savarone (later Victor Fontine)
- Jane Fontine – wife to Victor
- Adrian – twin son to Victor
- Andrew – twin son to Victor
