= Mechanic: Resurrection =

2016 American action thriller film

Mechanic
- Theatrical release poster
- Directed by: Dennis Gansel
- Screenplay by: Philip Shelby; Tony Mosher
- Story by: Brian Pittman; Philip Shelby
- Based on: Characters by Lewis John Carlino; Richard Wenk
- Produced by: John Thompson; Robert Earl; David Winkler; William Chartoff
- Starring: Jason Statham; Jessica Alba; Tommy Lee Jones; Michelle Yeoh; Sam Hazeldine
- Cinematography: Daniel Gottschalk
- Edited by: Michael Duthie; Todd E. Miller; Ueli Christen
- Music by: Mark Isham
- Production companies: Summit Premiere; Millennium Films; Davis Films; Chartoff-Winkler Productions
- Distributed by: Lionsgate
- Release dates: August 22, 2016 (ArcLight Hollywood); August 26, 2016 (United States)
- Running time: 98 minutes
- Country: United States
- Language: English
- Budget: $40 million
- Box office: $125.8 million

Mechanic: Resurrection is a 2016 American action thriller film directed by Dennis Gansel and written by Philip Shelby and Tony Mosher, with a story by Shelby and Brian Pittman. It is the sequel to the 2011 film The Mechanic, which was a remake of the 1972 film of the same name. The film stars Jason Statham, Tommy Lee Jones, Jessica Alba, and Michelle Yeoh.

Mechanic: Resurrection premiered in Hollywood on August 22, 2016, and was theatrically released in the United States on August 26, 2016. It received generally negative reviews from critics, but grossed $125 million worldwide against a budget of $40 million, eclipsing the total of its predecessor.

== Plot ==
Since faking his own death, Arthur Bishop has been living quietly in Rio de Janeiro under the name Santos. He is approached by a courier, Renee Tran, who has tracked him down, and explains that her employer wants Bishop to kill three targets and stage their deaths as accidents as is his specialty. Bishop escapes her and flees to Thailand. He takes shelter at the resort island beach house of his friend, Mei, and learns that Tran is working for Riah Crain.

Bishop and Mei rescue a woman Mei sees being beaten by a man aboard a boat. In the scuffle, the man's head hits a bollard and he dies. Bishop sets the boat ablaze and discovers that the woman, Gina Thornton, was planted there for him, and is connected to Crain. He concludes that Crain anticipated Bishop would become romantically involved with her, then kidnap her as leverage so that Bishop would take on the assassinations. Gina reveals that Crain had threatened the children's shelter in Cambodia that she runs unless she participated. Over the next few days, Bishop gets to know Gina better, and they fall in love. He reveals that he knew Crain as a child, as the two were sold to the same gang as kids. Crain holds a grudge because Bishop escaped the gang and Crain feels he abandoned him. As expected, Crain's mercenaries abduct them and Crain keeps Gina hostage to ensure Bishop completes the assassinations.

The first target is a warlord named Krill, held in a Malaysian prison. Bishop gets himself imprisoned, and gains Krill's trust by killing a man who attempts to murder Krill. Bishop then kills Krill himself by overdosing him with snake venom, and escapes with the help of Crain's operatives. The next target is Adrian Cook, a Sydney-based billionaire and former human trafficker. Bishop bypasses Cook's penthouse apartment's tight security and breaks the glass bottom of his overhanging cantilever pool with a tube of chemicals, thereby sending Cook plummeting 76 stories to his death.

After each assassination, Crain allows Bishop to speak to Gina on video call. Gina helps Bishop to identify Crain's boat and he attempts a rescue, but Crain thwarts it. The final target is Max Adams, an American arms dealer in Varna, Bulgaria. Bishop discovers these targets are Crain's arms-dealing competition and he is using Bishop to take them out. He decides to work with Adams instead of killing him, warning him of Crain so the two can take him down together. Faking Adams' death, Bishop directs Crain to Adams' submarine pen to find his body.

At the pen, Bishop decimates Crain's mercenaries, then makes for Crain's boat nearby. Discovering the boat is rigged with explosives, Bishop puts Gina in an emergency release pod. He then overpowers Crain and secures him to the boat with a metal chain. The bombs explode, killing Crain and seemingly Bishop.

Gina is rescued, and the remains of Crain's boat are salvaged. Gina returns to Cambodia, and is surprised when Bishop arrives at her children's shelter. Adams discovers that Bishop survived by escaping in a watertight anchor-chain locker, but destroys the evidence as a token of gratitude for sparing his life and enabling him to monopolize the arms trade.

== Cast ==
- Jason Statham as Arthur Bishop
- Jessica Alba as Gina Thornton
- Tommy Lee Jones as Max Adams
- Michelle Yeoh as Mei
- Sam Hazeldine as Riah Crain
- John Cenatiempo as Jeremy Cocs
- Toby Eddington as Adrian Cook
- Femi Elufowoju Jr. as Marlon Krill
- Francis Tonkala Tamouya as Nuujib "The Slender Psycho"
- Rhatha Phongam as Renee Tran, Crain's Courier
- Anteo Quintavalle as Frank, Crain's Thug
- Aaron Brumfield as Adams' Head of Security
- Vithaya Pansringarm as Prison Warden
- Rachel O'Meara as Leasing Agent
- Soji Ikai as Skinny Prisoner
- Natalie Burn as BBC Reporter
- Raicho Vasilev as Fletcher, Crain's Guard (uncredited)
- Dylan Farrell as young Arthur Bishop (uncredited)

== Production ==
=== Casting ===
On February 4, 2015, Natalie Burn was added to the cast of the film.

=== Filming ===
Filming began on November 4, 2014, in Bangkok, Thailand. Filming also took place in Buzludzha (Bulgaria), George Town (Malaysia), Sugarloaf Mountain (Brazil), Sydney Harbour (Australia), and Phnom Penh (Cambodia)

== Release ==
=== Theatrical ===
On November 7, 2014, Lionsgate set the film for a January 22, 2016, release. The film was later moved back to April 15, 2016, and on August 3, 2015, the release was again delayed until August 26, 2016.

== Reception ==
=== Box office ===
Mechanic: Resurrection grossed $21.2 million in North America and $104.5 million in other territories for a worldwide total of $125.7 million.

The film was released in the United States and Canada on August 26, 2016, alongside Don't Breathe and Hands of Stone, and was projected to open to $6–8 million from 2,258 theaters. It grossed $2.6 million on its first day and $7.5 million in its opening weekend, finishing 5th at the box office.

In China, the film made $24.3 million in its opening weekend. China was the largest territory for the film, with a total gross of $49.2 million.

=== Critical response ===
On review aggregation website Rotten Tomatoes the film holds an approval rating of 31% based on 59 reviews, with an average rating of 4.45/10. The website's critical consensus reads: "With little to recommend beyond a handful of entertaining set pieces, Mechanic: Resurrection suggests this franchise should have remained in its tomb." On Metacritic, which assigns a weighted average score, the film has a score of 38 out of 100, based on 15 critics, indicating "generally unfavorable reviews". Audiences polled by CinemaScore gave the film an average grade of "B+" on an A+ to F scale.

Variety's Owen Gleiberman gave the film a positive review and praised Statham. He says this is what the first film should have been, "a bite-sized Bond film, or maybe a grittier homicidal knockoff of the Mission: Impossible series, with a lone-wolf renegade as the entire team". Frank Scheck of The Hollywood Reporter praised Statham, but gave a mixed review, saying, "it's all about as ridiculous as it sounds, with Statham's character hopscotching across the globe in mere hours; equipped with unlimited resources and advanced knowledge of chemistry, architecture and engineering; and seemingly physically invulnerable", but also noted "the film is certainly watchable, thanks to the elaborately staged action sequences and Statham's killer charisma".
