= Philip Shelby =

American writer (1950–2019)

Philip Shelby (12 July 1950 – 18 December 2019) was an American writer, possibly best known for writing the second novel, The Cassandra Compact, in the Covert-One series in conjunction with fellow author Robert Ludlum.

== Works ==
=== Books ===
- This Far from Paradise (1988)
- The Tides (1989)
- Dream Weavers (1991)
- Oasis of Dreams (1992)
- Days of Drums (1996)
- Last Rights (1997)
- Gatekeeper (1998)
- The Cassandra Compact (2001)
- By Dawn's Early Light (2002)

=== Films ===
As screenwriter,

- Survivor (2015)
- Mechanic: Resurrection (2016)
