= The Cry of the Halidon =

1974 novel by Robert Ludlum

- The Cry of the Halidon first edition cover.
- Author: Robert Ludlum (originally published under the pen name Jonathan Ryder
- Language: English
- Genre: Spy novel
- Publisher: Delacorte Press
- Publication date: 1974
- Publication place: United States
- Media type: Print (hardback & paperback)
- Pages: 376 pp (first edition)
- ISBN: 0440021200
- OCLC: 805939
- Dewey Decimal: 813.54
- LC Class: PZ4.L9455 Cr PS3562.U26

The Cry of the Halidon is a 1974 suspense novel by Robert Ludlum.

== Plot summary ==
The story concerns a geologist, Alex McAuliff, who served in the Army as an infantry officer and fought in Vietnam, is commissioned to undertake a survey in Jamaica. It's an offer McAuliff just can't refuse: two million dollars for a geological survey of Jamaica's dark interior. All Dunstone, Limited asks for in return is his time, his expertise, and above all his absolute secrecy. No one is to know of Dunstone's involvement - not even McAuliff's handpicked team.

But British Intelligence knows and they've let Alex know a secret of their own: the last survey team sent to Jamaica by Dunstone vanished without a trace. For McAuliff, it's too late to turn back. Alex already knows about Dunstone...which means he already knows too much.

Alex is targeted by an unknown party, which may be Dunstone Limited, British Intelligence, or a rival company. An island, a woman who may be a spy, and the word "Halidon" are central to his survival.

In common with other Ludlum novels the lead character discovers there is more to the deal than expected and McAuliff is enlisted by British Intelligence. The story develops as McAuliff's resources and abilities are tested eventually leading him to a secret organisation hidden in the Jamaican mountains.
