= The Scorpio Illusion =

1993 novel by Robert Ludlum

- The Scorpio Illusion first edition cover.
- Author: Robert Ludlum
- Language: English
- Genre: Spy novel
- Publisher: HarperCollins
- Publication date: April 8, 1993
- Publication place: United Kingdom
- Media type: Print (hardback & paperback)
- Pages: 496 pp (first edition)
- ISBN: 0-00-223971-X
- OCLC: 60104802

The Scorpio Illusion is a 1993 novel by Robert Ludlum. It is a mix of suspense, drama, action and thriller.

== Analysis ==
The novel "consciously draws on Freudian theory to lend depth to his treatment of the two dominant characters, a psychotic woman, driven by childhood traumas to emasculate dominant males and to destroy all symbols of male hierarchical power, and her opponent, a weakened, age-conscious male reaffirming his masculine strengths."

There is a factual error in the novel. Telephone conversations using scrambling are an important plot element in this novel. However, from about half-way through one side of the call is on a normal telephone. This is impossible; both phones must be equipped with compatible scrambler/descramblers.
