= The Bancroft Strategy =

Novel by Robert Ludlum

- The Bancroft Strategy first edition cover.
- Author: Robert Ludlum
- Language: English
- Genre: Thriller, spy
- Publisher: St. Martin's Press
- Publication date: October 17, 2006
- Publication place: United States
- Media type: Print (hardback & paperback)
- Pages: 544 pp (first edition)
- ISBN: 0-312-31673-9
- OCLC: 68373459
- Dewey Decimal: 813/.54 22
- LC Class: PS3562.U26 B36 2006

The Bancroft Strategy is a spy novel credited to Robert Ludlum, posthumously published on October 17, 2006.

== Characters ==
- Andrea Bancroft
- Todd Belknap alias Castor
- Jared Rinehart alias Pollux
- Paul and Brandon Bancroft
- William Garrison

== Plot summary ==
Todd Belknap, a field agent for Consular Operations, is cut loose from the agency after a job gone wrong. But when his best friend and fellow agent is abducted abroad and the government refuses to step in, Belknap decides to take matters into his own hands.

Meanwhile, Andrea Bancroft learns she’s about to inherit 12 million dollars from a cousin she never met—with one condition: She must sit on the board of the Bancroft family foundation. Having been estranged from her father’s family for most of her life, Andrea is intrigued. But what exactly is the Bancroft’s involvement with “Genesis,” a mysterious person working to destabilize the geopolitical balance at the risk of millions of lives? In a series of devastating coincidences, Andrea and Belknap come together and must form an uneasy alliance if they are to uncover the truth behind “Genesis”—before it is too late.

== Different versions ==
The Orion Books 2007 edition of The Bancroft Strategy contains a blurb on the rear jacket that refers to an Anne Newton and a Newton Foundation that do not appear anywhere in the book. Jared Reinhart is hired by The Newton Foundation to eliminate the threats and manipulate world events to create chaos.
