= The Matlock Paper =

1973 novel by Robert Ludlum

- First edition
- Author: Robert Ludlum
- Language: English
- Genre: Thriller novel
- Publisher: Dial Press
- Publication date: April 1973
- Publication place: United States
- Media type: Print (Hardback & Paperback)
- Pages: 312 pp
- ISBN: 0-8037-5535-X
- OCLC: 532257
- Dewey Decimal: 813.54

The Matlock Paper is the third suspense novel by Robert Ludlum, in which a solitary protagonist comes face to face with a massive criminal conspiracy.

Its protagonist, James Barbour Matlock, is an English professor in his 30s who is recruited by the Department of Justice to investigate a drug smuggling ring, led by a mysterious figure named "Nimrod". The novel is set at the fictitious Carlyle University in Connecticut, a thinly disguised Wesleyan University in Middletown, Ludlum's alma mater.

== Publication history ==
- 1973, US, Dial Press ISBN 0246107529, Pub date April 1973, Hardback
- 1974, US, Dell ISBN 0-440-15538-X, Pub date April 15, 1974, Paperback
- 1973, UK, Grafton ISBN 0-246-10752-9 Pub date July 9, 1973, Hardback
- 2002, UK, HarperCollins ISBN 0-586-04067-6, Pub date April 15, 2002, Paperback
