= George Richard Marek =

American music executive and biographer

External image
- Photograph of David Merrick and George R. Marek

George Richard Marek (13 July 1902 – 7 January 1987) was an Austrian-born American music executive and author of biographies of classical composers.

Marek was born in Vienna, then the capital of the Austro-Hungarian Empire, the son of dentist Martin Marek and Emily Weisberger. From 1918, Marek studied at the University of Vienna until he emigrated to the United States in 1920, where he became a citizen in 1925. He married Muriel Heppner the following year; the couple had one son, editor, publisher, and author Richard Marek.

Marek's first job in the US was as a stock boy in the ostrich-feather department of a milliner, but he soon became involved in advertising. From 1930 until 1950, he was vice president of the J. D. Tarcher Agency. In 1950 Marek unsuccessfully attempted to gain RCA Victor's advertising account for Tarcher; instead, he was offered the position of manager of artists and repertory at RCA Victor. Seven years later he became vice president and general manager of RCA Victor; he remained in that position until 1972.

When he grew up in Vienna, Marek had regularly visited the Vienna State Opera; after his arrival in New York City, he became a devoted standee at the old Metropolitan Opera House. Marek was the music editor of Good Housekeeping from 1941 until 1957 and a co-founder of the Reader's Digest Record Club. He was for many years a panel member on the radio broadcasts of the Metropolitan Opera Quiz.

Marek introduced some pronounced changes in the marketing of classical music at RCA Victor. Record jackets became more colorful and classical records were sold in drugstores and supermarkets. He was responsible for the best selling album Classical Music for People Who Hate Classical Music in 1953. Marek was instrumental in promoting the recordings of pianists Gary Graffman and Arthur Rubinstein and conductors Pierre Monteux, Fritz Reiner, and Arturo Toscanini.

Marek continued in retirement as a consultant to RCA and the Reader's Digest Record Club. He died at the age of 84 at St. Luke's-Roosevelt Hospital Center in New York City; he was survived by his wife and their son, and two brothers, Carl and Frederick, both of Manhattan, and a sister, Anneliese Fish, of White Plains.

Some of his books have been translated into other languages. Marek also wrote magazine articles, e.g. for Harper's Bazaar, and liner notes; he was nominated for the 1977 Grammy Award for Best Album Notes for Beethoven: The Five Piano Concertos, with Daniel Barenboim conducting the London Philharmonic Orchestra and Arthur Rubinstein playing the piano.

== Bibliography ==
- "Guiding your child to music", Pictorial Review, 1935
- "How to Listen to Music Over the Radio", Pictorial Review, 1937
- Bach on Records, foreword by Leopold Stokowski, Four Corners, 1942
- Beethoven on Records, foreword by Bruno Walter, Four Corners, 1942
- A Front Seat at the Opera, Allen, Towne & Heath, 1948
- The Good Housekeeping Guide to Musical Enjoyment, Rinehart & Company, 1949
- Puccini: A Biography, Simon & Schuster, 1951
- Opera as Theater, Harper & Row, 1962, (reprint by Greenwood Press, 1977, ISBN 978-0-8371-9594-0)
- The World Treasury of Grand Opera, Its Triumphs, Trials and Great Personalities (editor), Harper, January 1957
- Richard Strauss, Gentleman Genius, Simon & Schuster, 1966
- Richard Strauss: Life of a Non-Hero, Victor Gollancz Ltd, November 1967, ISBN 978-0-575-01069-7
  - in Spanish: Vida de un Antihero, 1985, Javier Vergara, ISBN 978-950-15-0501-6
- Beethoven: Biography of a Genius, Funk & Wagnalls, 1969
  - in Polish: Beethoven: biografia geniusza, Państwowy Instytut Wydawniczy, 1997, ISBN 978-83-06-02605-4, OCLC 39518213
  - in German: Ludwig van Beethoven: Das Leben eines Genies, mvg, 1970, OCLC 174360714
  - in Spanish: Javier Vergara, 1985, ISBN 978-950-15-0501-6
  - in Russian (as Джордж Марек): Рихард Штраус: Последний романтик, ISBN 978-5-227-01923-3, OCLC 68906897
- The Eagles Die: Franz Joseph, Elisabeth, and Their Austria, Harper & Row, 1974, ISBN 978-0-246-10880-7
- Gentle Genius: The Story of Felix Mendelssohn, Apollo Editions, 1972, ISBN 978-0-8152-0374-2
- Toscanini: A Biography, Vision Press, June 1976, ISBN 978-0-85478-463-9
- The Bed and the Throne: The Life of Isabella d'Este, Harper & Row, 1976, ISBN 978-0-06-012810-4
- Chopin, with Maria Gordon-Smith, Littlehampton Book Services, 1978, ISBN 978-0-297-77616-1
  - in Polish: Warszawa Czytelnik, 1990, ISBN 978-83-07-01558-3, OCLC 243726053
- Cosima Wagner, Julia Macrae, February 1983, ISBN 978-0-86203-120-6
  - in German: Hestia, 1982, OCLC 9648021
  - in Japanese: (ワーグナーの妻コジマ: リストの娘の愛と策謀 / Wāgunā no tsuma kojima: risuto no musume no ai to sakubō), 中央公論社 / Chūō Kōronsha, 1983, ISBN 978-4-12-001257-0, OCLC 47373895
- "Richard Strauss and Hugo von Hofmannsthal, a Reevaluation" in Richard Strauss: Der Rosenkavalier (The Metropolitan Opera Classics Library), Little & Brown, 1982, ISBN 0-316-56834-1
- Schubert: A Biography, Viking Adult, November 1985, ISBN 978-0-670-62104-0
  - also in Spanish: Javier Vergara, 1986, ISBN 978-968-497-128-8, OCLC 14230788
