= Trevayne =

1973 novel by Jonathan Ryder

- First edition
- Author: Jonathan Ryder
- Language: English
- Genre: Thriller novel
- Published: 1973 (Delacorte Press)
- Publication place: United States
- Media type: Print (Hardback & Paperback)
- Pages: 407
- ISBN: 0553281798
- OCLC: 38100589
- Dewey Decimal: 813.54

Trevayne is Robert Ludlum's fourth novel, published in 1973 under the pseudonym Jonathan Ryder.

The novel centers around an independent and headstrong tycoon who reluctantly accepts an appointment from the President of the United States to head a subcommission to investigate malfeasance and rampant corruption committed by contractors and subcontractors with the Pentagon. The investigation quickly unearths dangerous truths.

The book was later reissued under Ludlum's proper name. Ludlum explained the reason for his use of a pseudonym by saying he "had to publish Trevayne under another name. I chose Jonathan Ryder — the first name of one son, the second a contraction of my wife's maiden name — not because of potential retribution, but because the conventional wisdom of the time was that a novelist did not author more than a book a year. Why? Damned if I could figure it out. Something to do with 'marketing psychology', whatever the hell that is."

This novel is the only Ludlum novel without the word "The" in the title.
