= The Apocalypse Watch =

1995 novel by Robert Ludlum

- The Apocalypse Watch first edition cover.
- Author: Robert Ludlum
- Language: English
- Genre: Thriller novel
- Publisher: HarperCollins
- Publication date: April 10, 1995
- Publication place: United Kingdom
- Media type: Print (hardback & paperback) & Audiobook
- Pages: 480 pp (first edition)
- ISBN: 0-00-223972-8
- OCLC: 60115623

The Apocalypse Watch (1995) is a novel by Robert Ludlum. A TV movie based on it aired in 1997 which starred Patrick Bergin and Virginia Madsen. This was Ludlum's second novel to focus on a neo-Nazi conspiracy to take over the world, after The Holcroft Covenant (1978).

== Plot ==
In the Hausruck Hills in Austria, CIA agent Harry Latham attempts infiltrating a secret training airfield belonging to the Brüderschaft der Wacht (The Brotherhood of the Watch), a Neo-nazi movement gradually building a renaissance of the Nazi ideology across Europe. However, he's exposed and captured, and the Brotherhood's chief surgeon, Dr. Gerhardt Kroeger, performs a microchip implant experiment on Harry in an attempt to make him a controllable double-agent.

In Paris, the suicidal act of deranged World War II veteran Pierre Jodelle in a theater draws the attention of Drew Latham, Harry's younger brother and an agent for the United States Department of Consular Operations, whom believes Jodelle might have uncovered a potential Neo-nazi network in France, being his best clue to find his missing brother. After suffering an attempt on his life, Drew is put under the protection of the Deuxième Bureau under Director Claude Moreau, on a request from Drew's superior officer, Director Wesley Sorenson. As Drew continues his investigation, he's also assisted by Stanley 'Stosh' Witkowski, a Cold War veteran and Chief of Security for the US Embassy in Paris, and Karin De Vries, a linguistics expert and records specialist (and an unofficial black ops agent). Sudden and unexpectedly, Harry makes contact with the CIA weeks later, providing an explosive, suspicious incriminating list involving high-profile personnel, from politicians to celebrities, that he acquired under the alias 'Alexander Lassiter' - In fact, this is a move by the Brotherhood itself to provoke discord amongst the world's nations, removing strategic personnel to be replaced with the Brotherhood's homegrown sleeper agents, the Sonnenkinder, who'd "pave the road for the Fourth Reich". Drew and Harry meet each other at the Paris airport, but suddenly are targeted by the Brotherhood's assassins in a blitzkrieg attack. Though Drew survives, Harry is a confirmed kill.

Moved by grief, determined to avenge his brother and draw the Brotherhood's agents into the open, Drew decides to assume Harry's identity, leading them to believe he survived the attack. The fact that Harry's corpse could be recovered in time and couldn't be identified by the assassins whom rashly left the scene only strengthens the scenario, drawing the concern and even desperation from Kroeger, fearing his microchip experiment (which has an expiry date that'd result in the chip's detonation) would be exposed. Kroeger dispatches a unit of elite assassins - the Blitzkrieger - to neutralize Drew, but he and Witkowski repel the attempts, to the point the Blitzkrieger, fearing execution for their repeated failures, desert the Brotherhood and go into self-imposed exile in Argentina. Kroeger is eventually captured afterwards and taken to interrogation, but becomes unable to produce much relevant information.

Drew's investigation into Kroeger's contacts, the Blitzkrieger attacks and the repeated attempts on his life reveal an informant network within the U.S. Embassy, which is eventually revealed to be headed by Janine Clunes Courtland, a Sonnenkind agent implanted years ago and wife to U.S. Ambassador Daniel Courtland. As Drew, Witkowski, De Vries and even the Deuxième attempt following her steps, to much little avail, Moreau and Sorenson perform their own investigations into both Clunes and Kroeger's connections, they come across the name of Dr. Hans Traupman, a neurosurgeon whom is a close friend of Kroeger, and has shown to have a connection with the Brotherhood. When Clunes is reunited with her husband (a devised plan to attempt reaching her), she is killed in a sudden strike by the Brotherhood's assassins whom quickly escape again. Witkowski, in an attempt to root out the Brotherhood's agents, forces Moreau to secret away her corpse and deliberately lie to the press that she survived the assault. Moreau himself, after an assassination attempt on his life, eventually confesses his involvement as a double agent for the Brotherhood, using their money payments for a secret revenge plan of his own making, which will be exposed if Moreau decides to interfere. Sorenson orders a black ops operation to kidnap Dr. Traupman and bring him to France for interrogation.

In Nuremberg, Drew, Witkowski, De Vries and two special operations specialists (Gerald Antony and Christian Dietz) succeed in capturing Traupman in a sudden boat boarding operation in the Rhine river. Deciding to follow the boat's proposed trail, they discover a meeting of potential Neo-Nazi leadership members in a shore house, and De Vries discovers to her shock that her former husband Frederik, believed to have been captured and killed by the Stasi years ago, is the elected neo-Nazi leader using the alias 'Gunter Jäger'. They also discover a plan by the Brotherhood, codenamed "Water Lightning" to provoke a mass poisoning crisis in both the United States, United Kingdom and France by contaminating each capital's water supply, forcing each political leader to resign and allowing the Brotherhood to implant more Sonnenkinder in the void ranks. De Vries attempts confronting Frederik, alone, to learn and stop the operation, but she's nearly raped before Drew's team storms Frederik's shore house. As Frederik nearly overpowers Drew, De Vries shoots and kills Frederik. The evidence recovered plus intelligence analysis and Drew's quick deduction has them discover that the Brotherhood is using glider aircraft to carry out the chemical strike, as they would not be easily spotted on radar and be untargetable by anti-air missiles. The attack is successfully countered on the nick of time, but Drew learns shortly afterwards Moreau was mysteriously assassinated.

At the Deuxiéme, Drew firstly talks and then coerces his eventual friendly chauffeur, François into revealing that Jacques Bergeron, Moreau's aide and right-hand, was the one responsible for Moreau's murder, being revealed as an implanted Sonnenkind, and François as a coerced agent under blackmail. Bergeron evades capture and goes into hiding. François, afterwards, phones Drew revealing that Bergeron, in one night, ordered François to collect old documents and deliver them to an old castle in the Loire valley, Le Nid de I'Aigle (The Eagle's Nest), the property of a former French General named André Monluc, told to have been a close friend to Charles De Gaulle, but Jodelle believed him to be a traitor.

Drew, Witkowski and De Vries organize a night raid operation to breach the castle, detain both Monluc and Bergeron and recover all and any information. With the aid of two hired prostitutes whom were spending the night at the place, Drew and his team are able to neutralize all resistance, but discover in shock when encountering Monluc, in a comatose state, seeing his facial features match exactly those of Adolf Hitler, under a very advanced age. As Bergeron is captured, De Vries and Latham discover a massive computer room with records, where they acquire over two thousand printed records with the real names of every real member in the Brotherhood across the globe. As the information is delivered to the world's intelligence agencies whom start taking action, Monluc passes away from a heart attack. In a secret laboratory in the Shenandoah Valley, DNA analysis reveals Monluc was in fact Hitler, but all evidence is destroyed to preserve established historical facts and prevent creating a legend for potential future neo-Nazis.

Drew and De Vries return to the U.S., discovering that, as Harry made some brilliant investments in the world's stock markets when he was alive, earned a millionaire fortune that was inherited to Drew. As they check out the reach in Granby, Colorado for their future house, Witkowski arrives and tries convincing Drew to return to work. Drew immediately refuses.

== Publication history ==
- Pub date April 10, 1995, UK, HarperCollins ISBN 0-00-223972-8, Hardback
- Pub date May 1, 1995, US, Random House Audio ISBN 0-553-47378-6, Audiobook
- Pub date May 1, 1995, US, Bantam ISBN 0-553-09993-0, Hardback
- Pub date August 21, 1995, UK, HarperCollins Audio ISBN 0-00-104985-2, Audiobook
- Pub date March 4, 1996, UK, HarperCollins ISBN 0-00-649629-6, Paperback
- Pub date April 1, 1996, US, Bantam ISBN 0-553-56957-0, Paperback
