= The Tristan Betrayal =

2003 novel by Robert Ludlum

- The Tristan Betrayal first edition cover.
- Author: Robert Ludlum
- Language: English
- Genre: Spy novel
- Publisher: St. Martin's Press
- Publication date: October 28, 2003
- Publication place: United States
- Media type: Print (Hardback & Paperback)
- Pages: 528 pp (first edition)
- ISBN: 0-312-31669-0
- OCLC: 52813974
- Dewey Decimal: 813/.54 22
- LC Class: PS3562.U26 T75 2003

The Tristan Betrayal is a novel by Robert Ludlum, published posthumously in 2003. Ludlum wrote an outline shortly before his death. The novel itself was written by a ghostwriter.

== Summary ==
In the fall of 1940, the Nazis are at the height of their power – France is occupied, Britain is enduring the Blitz and is under constant threat of invasion, America is neutral, and Russia is in an uneasy alliance with Germany.

In this dark time, Stephen Metcalfe is living the high life in occupied Paris. The younger son of a prominent American family, Metcalfe is a handsome young man who is a notable guest at all the best parties, has been romantically linked to the elite's most desirable women, and is in great demand in the upper echelons of Paris society. He is also a minor asset in the U.S.'s secret intelligence forces in Europe, cavalierly playing The Great Game like so many socially connected young men before him. However, what has been largely an amusing game becomes deadly serious – the spy network he was a part of is suddenly dismantled in the midst of war-torn Europe and he is left without a contact, actual orders, or a contingency plan.

With no one else in place, it falls to Metcalfe to instigate a bold plan that may be the only hope for the quickly dwindling remains of the free world. Using his family's connections and relying on his own devices, he travels to wartime Moscow to find and possibly betray a former lover – a fiery ballerina whose own loyalties are in question – in a delicate dance that could destroy all he loves and honors. With his opponents closing in on him and the war itself rapidly approaching an irreversible crisis point, Stephen Metcalfe faces both a difficult task and an impossible decision, where success will have unimaginable consequences far into the future and failure is unthinkable.

== Publication history ==
- 2003, UK, Orion House ISBN 0752857479, Pub date September 30, 2003, Hardback
- 2003, US, St. Martin's Press ISBN 0-312-31669-0, Pub date October 28, 2003, Hardback
- 2004, US, St. Martin's Press ISBN 0-312-99068-5, Pub date August 5, 2004, Paperback
- 2004, UK, Orion ISBN 0-7528-5906-4, Pub date July 1, 2004, Paperback
