= Dead Spy Running =

2009 spy novel by Jon Stock

- First edition
- Language: English
- Genre: Spy novel
- Publisher: HarperCollins
- Publication date: 2009
- Publication place: United Kingdom
- Media type: Print (Hardcover, Softcover)
- ISBN: 978-0-00-730069-3
- Preceded by: The Cardamom Club

Dead Spy Running is a 2009 spy novel by Jon Stock.

== Plot ==
When suspended MI6 agent Daniel Marchant participates in the London Marathon he discovers a suicide bomber among the other runners. As Marchant eventually figures out the very man is determined to commit a terrorist attack against the American Embassy. Marchant foils the attempt and saves the American ambassador. Unfortunately his good deed backfires for him because the United States Secret Service finds it all too unlikely that he got entangled in this matter only by coincidence. They have him arrested and interrogated for suspect of collaborationism with anti-western terrorist groups. After his jailbreak western secret services chase Marchant around the world.

== Book deal ==
In July 2008 Stock signed a three book deal, with Blue Door, a new HarperCollins imprint. Dead Spy Running the very first book in the trilogy was published in July 2009.

== Sequels ==
The sequel of the novel is Games Traitors Play publish on 29 September 2011 and the third novel in the series is Dirty Little Secret published on 5 July 2012.

== Film ==
Warner Bros. acquired the movie rights to the Dead Spy Running franchise in October 2008 to make the first of a proposed three movie franchise, they signed on Charlie's Angels director McG to direct the movie along with Stephen Gaghan to write the screen play. It was initially reported that after the shooting of McG's last movie Terminator Salvation, he would be taking up the shooting of the remake Captain Nemo: 20,000 Leagues Under the Sea, but with the cancelling of this movie by Disney it appears that Dead Spy Running will be the next movie to be taken up.
