= The Ambler Warning =

2005 American novel by Robert Ludlum

- The Ambler Warning first edition cover.
- Author: Robert Ludlum
- Cover artist: Craig White
- Language: English
- Genre: Thriller, spy
- Publisher: St. Martin's Press
- Publication date: October 18, 2005
- Publication place: United States
- Media type: Print (hardback & paperback)
- Pages: 528 pp (first edition)
- ISBN: 0-312-31671-2
- OCLC: 60414008
- Dewey Decimal: 813/.54 22
- LC Class: PS3562.U26 A75 2005

The Ambler Warning is a Robert Ludlum spy thriller set in part on Parrish Island, a restricted island off the coast of Virginia. Left as an incomplete manuscript by Ludlum's death in 2001, the author's estate hired an author and an editor to finalize the manuscript for publication in October 2005. Early sales placed it on The New York Times Best Seller list within a month of its release.

== Plot introduction ==
Inside a little-known and seldom visited psychiatric facility, Parrish Island, the government stores former intelligence employees whose psychiatric state make them a danger to their own government; people whose ramblings might endanger ongoing operations or prove dangerously inconvenient.

== Plot summary ==
Hal Ambler, a former Consular Operations agent in the Political Stabilization Unit, is kept heavily medicated and closely watched in a psychiatric facility just off the US coast. However, Ambler is unique amongst the other patients in the Parrish Island psychiatric facility, because he is perfectly sane. With the help of a sympathetic nurse, Ambler manages to clear his mind of the drug-induced haze and stage a daring escape off the island. Although he is desperate to discover who put him on Parrish Island and why, the world in which he returns appears to have conveniently forgotten him. Friends and associates no longer recognize him, no official records of his existence are to be found, and the face he sees in the mirror is not his own. After contacting several old associates who do not recognize him or even have any recollection of his existence, Ambler goes to a cabin in certain part of country which had always been his lone solace even during his days as a field agent. He arrives to find no cabin, and the landscape looked such that there hadn't been any before. A tranquillizer dart armed with carfetanyl then strikes him, but does not affect his thought processes severely . He tracks down the sniper and forces the sniper, a freelance operative, to give him authorisation codes. However, before the operative can be milked for more information, he is killed by a sniper whose single bullet also grazed Ambler's neck. He then contacts the agency that is tracking him down. Ambler comes in contact with agents from his past in the Political Stabilization Unit. Among those is Osiris, a blind operative who had an uncanny linguistic ability and has also regarded Ambler as his close friend. His friend is subsequently shot and killed by a Chinese intelligence officer independent of the organization Ambler is being hired by, who believes Ambler wants to assassinate the Chinese head of state. He uncovers a conspiracy involving a State Department official to kill the Chinese President, in order to hinder the shift in power and to restore the old world order of Pax Americana, in accordance with her university lecturer, Ashton Palmer's fanatical ideals. Ambler manages to unravel the conspiracy, while at the same time discovering that the nurse who had freed him and supposedly helped him on his endeavours to find out more about himself was in league with the "Palmerites", or so those who conform to Palmer's ideals are called. Ambler's ability to determine others' emotions and pick up even the slightest of change in facial expression is foiled, for the nurse was trained in Method acting. At the end of the book, Ambler is seen to be lounging with the desk-jockey CIA officer who had assisted him in self-discovery and the foiling of the conspiracy.

== Adaptation ==
In October 2025, Paramount Television Studios bought the rights to create a television series adaptation of the novel. The adaptation would reimagine Hal Ambler as a female agent named Erica Ambler to be portrayed by Jessica Biel. Jason Horwitch writes the series and is set to be the showrunner.
