= The Holcroft Covenant =

1978 thriller novel by Robert Ludlum

- First edition (UK)
- Author: Robert Ludlum
- Cover artist: John Knights
- Language: English
- Genre: Espionage
- Publisher: Granada (UK); Richard Marek (US)
- Publication date: July 27, 1978
- Publication place: United Kingdom
- Media type: Print (hard & paperback)
- Pages: 494 (first edition)
- ISBN: 0-246-11048-1
- OCLC: 59182171

The Holcroft Covenant is a 1978 thriller novel by American writer Robert Ludlum. In 1985 it was made into a film of the same name.

== Plot ==
The novel concerns Noel Holcroft, New York City architect and secretly (and unknown to Noel prior to the events of the novel) the son of Heinrich Clausen, chief economic adviser to the Third Reich. At some point in the 1970s, Holcroft is contacted by the Grande Banque de Geneve, concerning his father's will and testament. The testament says that in the last half of the war, Clausen found out about the Holocaust. Horrified and desperate to make amends, he and his two friends stole vast amounts of money from thousands of individual sources throughout the Reich and funneled them into a secure account in Zurich, Switzerland. Now, if Holcroft will contact the children of the two friends, they can form a group to distribute the funds and alleviate some of the pain of the Holocaust.

Ranged against him in this noble endeavor is the last trace of the Third Reich: the children of Projekt Sonnenkinder. In the dying days of the war, a vast search went out throughout Germany. The children of Germany's finest, those without physical and psychological frailties, were sent to isolated hamlets all over the world by airplane and U-boat. They were raised, provided for, and indoctrinated. Those who showed promise were inducted into the conspiracy by their elders; those that weren't were "removed". They have waited thirty years for the funds so as to finally take over the world. Their leader, the Tinamou, is the world's deadliest assassin.

As Holcroft attempts to carry out what he believes to be the noble, secret mission of his biological father, he is continuously blindsided as good guys turn out to be bad guys, bad guys turn out to be good guys, and Holcroft, who has no training whatsoever in intelligence and espionage, is forced to learn on the job.

== Background ==
Ludlum says the novel was inspired by a "what if" question. "What if Nazi children at the end of World War Two were being saved so that in the next generation they could revive the Third Reich? British intelligence had traced down the rumour and found it false. But that didn't stop me spinning it out into a story. You can call me a paranoiac if you like. But what I basically am is a skeptic."

== Reception ==
The Los Angeles Times called it a "rivetting, suspense-filled read." The novel was a best seller.

== Publication history ==
- 1978, UK, HarperCollins ISBN 0-246-11048-1 Pub date July 27, 1978, Hardback
- 1979, UK, Granada ISBN 0-586-04816-2, Pub date 1979, Paperback
- 1980, US, Putnam Pub Group ISBN 0-399-90001-2, Pub date April 1980, Hardback
- 1980, US, Bantam Books ISBN 0-553-14491-X, Pub date 1980, Paperback
