= The Chancellor Manuscript =

Novel by Robert Ludlum

- First edition
- Author: Robert Ludlum
- Language: English
- Genre: Thriller
- Publisher: Dial Press
- Publication date: June 1977
- Publication place: United States
- Media type: Print (hardback & paperback)
- ISBN: 0-385-27253-7
- OCLC: 234219381

The Chancellor Manuscript is a 1977 novel, by American writer Robert Ludlum, about the alleged secret files of J. Edgar Hoover and how they disappeared after his death, and how they possibly could be used to force people in high places to do the bidding of those who possessed the secrets contained therein. It also speculated that Hoover himself might have been assassinated because he knew too much about too many of the wrong people.

== Plot ==
In the prologue the protagonist meets an ambassador of the United States who is the subject of his thesis which is rejected. The ambassador convinces him to display his thesis in front of the public in the form of a novel. Chancellor complies, reluctantly, and soon becomes a famous novelist. The ambassador is revealed to be part of an organization known as Inver Brass. The organization is actually a group of intellectuals who intervene in political as well as economic matters when they think they are going off track. These intellectuals decide to assassinate J.Edgar Hoover, head of the Federal Bureau of Investigation, on the grounds that they believe his private files contain damaging information on various political, military and other very important figures, and that Hoover uses this information to control them. When Hoover is assassinated by the work of the ingenious NSC official Stefan Varak, half of the files are not found. To get the remaining files Inver Brass recruit Peter Chancellor to get to the files, using him, by giving him a new subject for his novel, telling him that Hoover has been assassinated so that he will investigate further. Chancellor is then trapped in a violent spiral, not knowing who his enemies are, desperately trying to finish his novel somehow.

== Characters ==
- Peter Chancellor : the protagonist. A student by profession who becomes a novelist on the suggestion of Munro St. Claire.
- Stefan Varak (aka Alan Longworth) : an operative of the NSC. He works for Inver Brass and is the one who engineers the murder of J. Edgar Hoover as well getting Peter Chancellor to unknowingly work for Inver Brass.
- Munro St. Clair (aka Bravo) : an ambassador of the United States of America. Also a member of Inver Brass known by the name of "Bravo".
- Alison MacAndrew : daughter of General MacAndrew. She becomes a love interest of the protagonist during the course of the book.
- Quinn O'Brien : an operative of the FBI. An associate of Varak. He helps Chancellor and MacAndrew by giving them protection.
- Other members of Inver Brass known by codewords Paris, Christopher, Venice, Genesis and Banner.

== Film ==
In January 2010 director Marc Forster acquired the rights of the novel to make it into a feature film. Leonardo DiCaprio was set to star and produce the film and Peter O'Brien was attached to write the script for the film. There have been no further developments.

== Sequel ==
A sequel was planned under the title The Chancellor Letter with a 100-page manuscript being produced by an unnamed science-fiction writer, but the Ludlum estate has yet to approve its publication.
