= The Aquitaine Progression =

1984 novel by Robert Ludlum

- The Aquitaine Progression first edition cover.
- Author: Robert Ludlum
- Language: English
- Genre: Thriller
- Publisher: Random House
- Publication date: February 12, 1984
- Publication place: United States
- Media type: Print (hardback & paperback)
- Pages: 647 pp (first edition)
- ISBN: 0-394-53674-6
- OCLC: 9943106
- Dewey Decimal: 813/.54 19
- LC Class: PS3562.U26 A87 1984

The Aquitaine Progression is a novel by Robert Ludlum originally published in 1984.

== Plot summary ==
Joel Converse is a lawyer, having previously been a fighter pilot in the Vietnam War. Because of his wartime experiences with Command Saigon, in the form of a psychopathic general named "Mad" Marcus Delavane, he is chosen to thwart a cabal of former generals bent on world domination.

== The Generals ==
- Erich Leifhelm, a former Field Marshal from Nazi Germany, who ingratiated himself with the West after the defeat of Hitler.
- Chaim Abrams, a tough-as-nails sabra, a hero to Israeli independence.
- Jacques-Louis Bertholdier, a hero of the French Resistance who revels in his past as an assistant to De Gaulle.
- Jan van Headmer, a South African general known as the "slayer of Soweto."
- George Marcus Delavane, a bloodthirsty U.S. general from the Vietnam war.

== Publication history ==
- 1984, US, Random House ISBN 0-394-53674-6, Pub date February 12, 1984, Hardback
- 1985, US, Bantam Books ISBN 0-553-24900-2, Pub date February 1, 1985, Paperback
- 1984, UK, Grafton ISBN 0-246-11418-5 Pub date March 1984, Hardback
- 1999, UK, HarperCollins ISBN 0-586-05277-1, Pub date January 4, 1999, Paperback
