= Richard Marek =

American businessman (1933–2020)

Richard Marek (June 14, 1933 – March 22, 2020) was an American writer, editor, and publisher who is best known for his novel Works of Genius that explores the odd relationships between authors and publishers in the publishing industry. He ran his own publishing imprint, Richard Marek Books, at Putnam Publishing Group from 1977 to 1981 and later served as the president of E. P. Dutton.

== Life ==
Marek was born June 14, 1933, in New York City to Muriel and music executive and author of classical composer biographies George Richard Marek. He earned his B.A. at Haverford College in 1955 and his M.A. at Columbia University in 1956. In college, Marek was a member of the Phi Beta Kappa honor society. Marek married Margot Lynn Ravage in 1954. The couple had two children before Marek's wife died in 1987. Marek served in the U.S. Army from 1956 to 1957. During that time he was stationed in Japan.

== Career ==
Marek's career in the publishing business began with his positions as an editor at McCall's magazine and his work at Macmillan publishing starting in 1962. In 1968, he signed the "Writers and Editors War Tax Protest" pledge, vowing to refuse tax payments in protest against the Vietnam War.

Over the course of his career, Marek was also employed at companies like World Publishing, and Dial Press. Marek ran his own publishing imprint, Richard Marek Books, at Putnam Publishing Group from 1977 to 1981. In 1985, Marek began serving as the president of E. P. Dutton. As Marek remarked in an online profile, he has been responsible for editing "well over 300 books".

Marek's first major piece of writing, Works of Genius (1987), was a novel that dealt with the inner workings of the publishing industry. The novel received praise from several major publications such as The Washington Post and The Los Angeles Times Book Review. Marek's second writing, Here is my Hope: A Book of Healing and Prayer: Inspirational Stories of the Johns Hopkins Hospital, was co-written with Randi Henderson and was published in 2001.

He died of esophageal cancer on March 25, 2020, at the age of 86.
