= Laura Caldwell =

American writer (1967–2020)

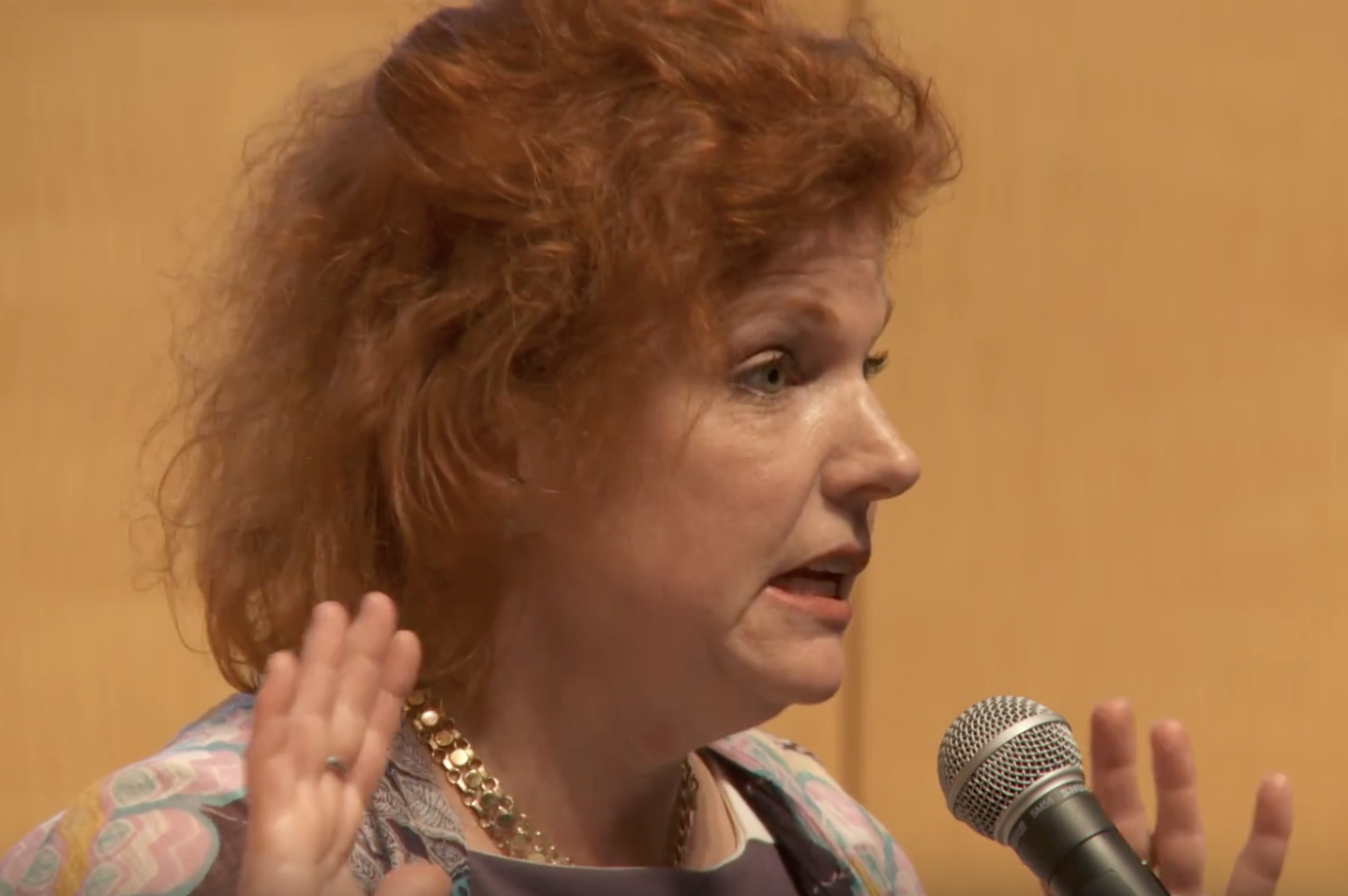
- Caldwell speaking at San Francisco Public University, 2017
- Born: October 24, 1967
- Died: March 1, 2020 (aged 52); River Forest, Illinois, U.S.
- Education: University of Iowa; Loyola University Chicago School of Law (JD)
- Occupations: Lawyer; law professor; author

Laura Caldwell (October 24, 1967 – March 1, 2020) was an American civil trial lawyer and also a law professor at Loyola University Chicago School of Law, founding director of Life After Innocence, published author of 14 novels and two non-fiction books. The latest book she co-edited is "Anatomy of Innocence: Testimonies of the Wrongfully Convicted" (Liveright, 2017), which tells the true stories of over a dozen innocent men and women who were convicted of serious crimes and cast into the maw of a vast and deeply flawed American criminal justice system before eventually, miraculously being exonerated.

With novels published in over 25 countries and translated into more than 13 languages, Caldwell had left the law behind, or so she thought. Research on her sixth novel led her to the criminal case of a young man sitting in a Cook County holding cell for nearly six years without a trial. Compelled by his story, Caldwell joined a renowned criminal defense attorney to defend him, ultimately proving his innocence and inspiring her first nonfiction book, Long Way Home: A Young Man Lost in the System and the Two Women Who Found Him (Free Press, Simon & Schuster).

By working with him and witnessing his struggle to assimilate back into the world, Caldwell became aware that, while many programs are available for ex-offenders after their release, the innocent in most states receive minimal to no assistance. Caldwell was inspired to create Life After Innocence, a new program that helped exonerees—people who have been wrongfully convicted and later found completely innocent—to begin their lives again and rejoin society.

Caldwell's fictional work began in the 'chick lit' genre, and she soon turned to writing mysteries and thrillers, most recently focusing her attention on a returning character, Izzy McNeil. The series has received critical acclaim and nominations for prestigious industry awards. Caldwell is also a freelance magazine writer and has been widely published both domestically and internationally.

== Education ==
Caldwell graduated Phi Beta Kappa from the University of Iowa and earned her J.D. with honors from Loyola University Chicago School of Law.

== Speaker ==
Caldwell spoke internationally, empowering audiences to overcome adversity by sharing the stories of her Life After Innocence clients and how they went from wrongfully imprisoned to regaining their lives.

== Author ==
Caldwell, who lived in the Chicago area, continued to write and bring about change in the legal system. Caldwell was a published author of 16 books – 14 novels and two nonfiction:

Anatomy of Innocence: Testimonies of the Wrongfully Convicted (2018, Liveright), The Dog Park (2014, Mira) False Impressions (2012, Mira) Question of Trust (2012, Mira) Claim of Innocence (2011, Mira) Long Way Home: A Young Man Lost In the System and the Two Women Who Found Him (2010, Free Press) Red White & Dead (2009, Mira) Red Blooded Murder (2009, Mira) Red Hot Lies (2009, Mira) The Good Liar (2008, Mira) The Rome Affair (2006, Mira) The Night I Got Lucky (2005, Red Dress Ink) Look Closely (2005, Mira) The Year of Living Famously (2004, Mira) A Clean Slate (2003, Red Dress Ink) Burning The Map (2002, Mira)

== Death ==
Caldwell died on March 1, 2020, in River Forest, Illinois, of breast cancer. She was 52 years old.

== See also ==
- List of wrongful convictions in the United States
