= Gayle Lynds =

American journalist, editor and spy fiction writer

- Born: 1945 (age 80–81); Omaha, Nebraska, U.S.
- Education: University of Iowa
- Occupations: Journalist; editor; author
- Known for: Co-founder of International Thriller Writers, Queen of Espionage Fiction
- Spouse(s): Dennis Lynds, John C. Sheldon
- Writing career
- Genres: Thriller, spy fiction
- Notable work: Masquerade

Gayle Lynds (born 1945) is an American former journalist, editor and author. Lynds is known as the Queen of Espionage Fiction for her spy fiction or spy thrillers novels. Lynds is the co-founder of International Thriller Writers.

== Early life ==
In 1945, Lynds was born in Omaha, Nebraska. Lynds' father was an artist who worked on woods. Lynds grew up in Council Bluffs, Iowa.

== Education ==
Lynds earned a Bachelor of Arts degree in journalism from the University of Iowa in Iowa City, Iowa.

== Career ==
Lynds began her writing career as a newspaper journalist for the Arizona Republic in Phoenix, Arizona. Lynds was an editor at a government think tank, where she also acquired a Top Secret security clearance.

Lynds' fiction career began with literary short stories published under her own name and several pulp fiction novels under male pseudonyms such as G.H. Stone, Gayle Stone, Nick Carter, and Don Pendleton.

In 1996, Lynds' first novel Masquerade was published. Lynds also wrote three novels in The Three Investigators, a YA mystery novel series. With Robert Ludlum, she created the Covert-One series and wrote three of the books.

In 2004, Lynds and David Morrell co-founded International Thriller Writers, Inc. and they became the first co-Presidents.

Lynds is known as the Queen of Espionage Fiction.

The Hades Factor, which she co-wrote with Robert Ludlum, was a CBS television miniseries in April 2006.

== Personal life ==
Lynds' husband was Dennis Lynds, also a novelist. Lynds and her family lived in Santa Barbara, California. In August 2005, Lynds' husband Dennis Lynds died.

In 2011 she married retired Maine district court judge John C. Sheldon. They lived near Portland.

Lynds lives in Maine where she is a full-time novelist.

== Works ==
This is a partial list of novels by Lynds.

=== Novels ===
- 1996 Masquerade - First spy novel written by a woman to become a bestseller.
- 1998 Mosaic
- 2001 Mesmerized
- 2004 The Coil - Won Military Writers Society of America Best Novel.
- 2006 The Last Spymaster - Won American Author's Association 2006 American Author Medal.
- 2010 The Book of Spies (also printed as The Library of Gold)
- 2015 The Assassins - Won Military Writers Society of America Founder’s Awards for Best Novel.

=== Covert-One series ===
This is a list of novels from the Covert-One series. Lynds co-wrote these novel with Robert Ludlum.

- 2000 The Hades Factor - Won American Author's Association 2008 Golden Quill Awards.
- 2002 The Paris Option
- 2003 The Altman Code

== Filmography ==
- Covert One: The Hades Factor (writer) (2006)

== Awards ==
- 2002 Finalist of Daphne du Maurier Award for Mesmerized.
- 2004 BookPage Notable Title for The Coil. It also won the Affaire de Coeur reader poll for "Best Contemporary Novel."
- 2006 American Author Medal for The Last Spymaster. Presented by American Author's Association.
- 2006 Novel of the Year prize for The Last Spymaster. Presented by the Military Writers Society of America.
- 2008 Golden Quill Awards for The Hades Factor. Presented by American Author's Association.
- Masquerade was listed by Publishers Weekly as one of the ten top spy novels of all time.
- Mosaic was named "Thriller of the Year" by Romantic Times magazine.
