= The Janson Directive =

Novel by Robert Ludlum

- The Janson Directive first edition cover
- Author: Robert Ludlum
- Language: English
- Genre: Spy novel
- Publisher: St. Martin's Press
- Publication date: October 15, 2002
- Publication place: United States
- Media type: Print (Hardback & Paperback)
- Pages: 542 pp (first edition)
- ISBN: 0-312-25348-6
- OCLC: 49529986
- Dewey Decimal: 813/.54 21
- LC Class: PS3562.U26 J36 2002

The Janson Directive is a novel by Robert Ludlum. The posthumous novel was published in 2002, a year after Ludlum's death.

== Plot ==
Paul Janson is an ex-Navy SEAL and former member of a U.S. government covert agency called Consular Operations. He is haunted by his memories of the Vietnam War and his brilliant commander and mentor, Alan Demarest. Unfortunately, Demarest was also a sadistic psychopath who loved to toy with the lives of both friend and foe; he arranged for Janson to be captured and tortured by the Viet Cong. Janson eventually escaped and provided evidence of war crimes, which led to Demarest's execution.

Janson now makes his living as a corporate security consultant who is so much in demand that he can pick and choose which jobs he takes. After a mysterious woman makes contact with him while Janson is waiting for a plane, he finds himself taking on a job to repay a debt. She asks Janson to rescue her boss, the Nobel Peace Laureate visionary and billionaire, Peter Novak, who has been taken hostage by a militant organization which intends to kill him.

But when the rescue goes horribly wrong, Janson finds himself the target of a "beyond salvage" termination directive (the directive of the title) issued from the highest levels of the U.S. government. Meanwhile, several senior U.S. government officials are assassinated. Janson is then faced with the difficult question of finding out who wanted to frame him for Novak's death, while dodging bullets from his former comrades at Consular Operations.

Janson takes matters into his own hands as he tries to save himself and solve the mystery of a decades-old conspiracy that will rock the foundations of all countries in the world if exposed.

== Adaptations ==
A feature film based on the novel is currently in development at Universal Pictures, produced by Dwayne Johnson and starring fellow WWE alumnus, John Cena, as Paul Janson. The script is being written by Akiva Goldsman and James Vanderbilt, and is set be the first film in a cinematic universe of Robert Ludlum adaptations with: The Parsifal Mosaic, The Sigma Protocol, Covert One and crossover films.

== Publication history ==
- 2002, US, St. Martin's Press ISBN 0-312-25348-6, Pub date October 15, 2002, Hardback
- 2003, US, St. Martin's Paperbacks ISBN 0-312-98938-5, Pub date October 7, 2003, Mass Market Paperback
- 2003, UK, Orion ISBN 0-7528-4589-6, Pub date January 6, 2003, Hardback
- 2003, UK, Orion ISBN 0-7528-4964-6, Pub date August 7, 2003, Paperback
