= Robert Ludlum =

American novelist (1927–2001)

- Robert Ludlum portrait photo
- Born: May 25, 1927; New York City, U.S.
- Died: March 12, 2001 (aged 73); Naples, Florida, U.S.
- Education: Wesleyan University, B.A. 1951
- Occupation: Novelist
- Spouse(s): Mary Ryducha; Karen Dunn
- Children: 3
- Writing career
- Pen name: Jonathan Ryder; Michael Shepherd
- Genres: Thriller, spy fiction, mystery
- Notable work: The Bourne Trilogy

Robert Ludlum (May 25, 1927 – March 12, 2001) was an American author of 27 thriller novels, best known as the creator of Jason Bourne from the original The Bourne Trilogy series. The number of copies of his books in print is estimated between 300 million and 500 million. They have been published in 33 languages and 40 countries. Ludlum also published books under the pseudonyms Jonathan Ryder and Michael Shepherd.

== Life and career ==
=== Early life and education ===
Ludlum was born in New York City, the son of Margaret (née Wadsworth) and George Hartford Ludlum. He was educated at the Rectory School then Cheshire Academy and Wesleyan University in Middletown, Connecticut, where he earned a B.A. in Drama in 1951.

=== Career ===
Prior to becoming an author, he had been a United States Marine, a theatrical actor and producer. In the 1950s, he produced shows at the Grant Lee theater in Fort Lee, New Jersey. From 1960 to 1970, he managed and produced shows at the Playhouse on the Mall at Bergen Mall in Paramus, New Jersey. His theatrical experience may have contributed to his understanding of the energy, escapism and action that the public wanted in a novel. He once remarked: "I equate suspense and good theater in a very similar way. I think it's all suspense and what-happens-next. From that point of view, yes, I guess, I am theatrical."

Many of Ludlum's novels have been made into films and mini-series, including The Osterman Weekend, The Holcroft Covenant, The Apocalypse Watch, The Bourne Identity, The Bourne Supremacy and The Bourne Ultimatum. Covert One: The Hades Factor, a book co-written with Gayle Lynds, was originally conceived as a mini-series; the book evolved from a short treatment Ludlum wrote for NBC. The Bourne movies, starring Matt Damon in the title role, have been commercially and critically successful (The Bourne Ultimatum won three Academy Awards in 2008), although the story lines depart significantly from the source material.

During the 1970s, Ludlum lived in Leonia, New Jersey, where he spent hours each day writing at his home.

=== Death ===
Ludlum died of a heart attack on March 12, 2001, at his home in Naples, Florida, while recovering from severe burns caused by a fire which occurred on February 10, 2001.

In 2005, the company which held all merchandising rights for Ludlum's works via his estate, Ludlum Entertainment, signed an agreement with Vivendi Universal Games to handle video game rights for ten years. Robert Ludlum's The Bourne Conspiracy was published by Vivendi approximately one month prior to its acquisition by Activision Blizzard, and the license was subsequently reacquired by the estate. On February 2, 2009, his estate transferred video game rights to Ludlum's work to Electronic Arts.

== Writing analysis ==
Ludlum's novels typically feature one heroic man, or a small group of crusading individuals, in a struggle against powerful adversaries whose intentions and motivations are evil and who are capable of using political and economic mechanisms in frightening ways. The world in his writings is one where global corporations, shadowy military forces and government organizations all conspired to preserve (if it was evil) or undermine (if it was law-abiding) the status quo.

Ludlum's novels were often inspired by conspiracy theories, both historical and contemporary. He wrote that The Matarese Circle was inspired by rumors about the Trilateral Commission, and it was published only a few years after the commission was founded. His depictions of terrorism in books such as The Holcroft Covenant and The Matarese Circle reflected the theory that terrorists, rather than being merely isolated bands of ideologically or politically motivated extremists, are actually pawns of governments or private organizations who are using them to facilitate the establishment of authoritarian rule.

== Adaptations ==
Many of Ludlum's novels have been made into films and miniseries, although the storylines might depart significantly from the source material. In general, a miniseries is more faithful to the original novel on which it is based. Adaptations of Ludlum's works are published under the trademark Treadstone, which is held by the executor of the Robert Ludlum estate.

- 1977 – The Rhinemann Exchange — miniseries — Stephen Collins as David Spaulding, Lauren Hutton as Leslie Jenner Hawkewood
- 1983 – The Osterman Weekend — film — Rutger Hauer as John Tanner, Sam Peckinpah directed
- 1985 – The Holcroft Covenant — film — Michael Caine as Noel Holcroft
- 1988 – The Bourne Identity — miniseries — Richard Chamberlain as Jason Bourne, Jaclyn Smith as Marie St. Jacques
- 1997 – The Apocalypse Watch — miniseries — Patrick Bergin as Drew Latham
- 2002 – The Bourne Identity — film — Matt Damon as Jason Bourne and Franka Potente as Marie Helena Kreutz
- 2004 – The Bourne Supremacy — film — Matt Damon as Jason Bourne
- 2006 – Covert One: The Hades Factor — miniseries — Stephen Dorff as Jon Smith
- 2007 – The Bourne Ultimatum — film — Matt Damon as Jason Bourne
- 2012 – The Bourne Legacy — film — starring Jeremy Renner, Rachel Weisz and Edward Norton
- 2016 – Jason Bourne — film — Matt Damon as Jason Bourne
- TBA – The Chancellor Manuscript — film — Leonardo DiCaprio as Peter Chancellor^{1}
- TBA – The Janson Directive — film — John Cena as Paul Janson^{1}

^{1} announced/in development

== See also ==
- Airport novel
- Publishers Weekly lists of bestselling novels in the United States
- Spy fiction
