= List of The New York Times number-one books of 1975 =

This is a list of books that topped The New York Times Best Seller list in 1975.

== Fiction ==
The following list ranks the number-one best-selling fiction books.

Date	Book	Author
January 5	Centennial	James Michener
January 12	Centennial	James Michener
January 19	Centennial	James Michener
January 26	Centennial	James Michener
February 2	Centennial	James Michener
February 9	Something Happened	Joseph Heller
February 16	Centennial	James Michener
February 23	Centennial	James Michener
March 2	Centennial	James Michener
March 9	Centennial	James Michener
March 16	Centennial	James Michener
March 23	Centennial	James Michener
March 30	Centennial	James Michener
April 6	Centennial	James Michener
April 13	Centennial	James Michener
April 20	Centennial	James Michener
April 27	Centennial	James Michener
May 4	The Moneychangers	Arthur Hailey
May 11	The Moneychangers	Arthur Hailey
May 18	The Moneychangers	Arthur Hailey
May 25	The Moneychangers	Arthur Hailey
June 1	The Moneychangers	Arthur Hailey
June 8	The Moneychangers	Arthur Hailey
June 15	The Moneychangers	Arthur Hailey
June 22	The Moneychangers	Arthur Hailey
June 29	The Moneychangers	Arthur Hailey
July 6	The Moneychangers	Arthur Hailey
July 13	The Moneychangers	Arthur Hailey
July 20	The Moneychangers	Arthur Hailey
July 27	The Moneychangers	Arthur Hailey
August 3	Looking for Mr. Goodbar	Judith Rossner
August 10	The Moneychangers	Arthur Hailey
August 17	Looking for Mr. Goodbar	Judith Rossner
August 24	Ragtime	E. L. Doctorow
August 31	Ragtime	E. L. Doctorow
September 7	Ragtime	E. L. Doctorow
September 14	Ragtime	E. L. Doctorow
September 21	Ragtime	E. L. Doctorow
September 28	Ragtime	E. L. Doctorow
October 5	Ragtime	E. L. Doctorow
October 12	Ragtime	E. L. Doctorow
October 19	Ragtime	E. L. Doctorow
October 26	Ragtime	E. L. Doctorow
November 2	Ragtime	E. L. Doctorow
November 9	Ragtime	E. L. Doctorow
November 16	Ragtime	E. L. Doctorow
November 23	Looking for Mr. Goodbar	Judith Rossner
November 30	Curtain	Agatha Christie
December 7	Curtain	Agatha Christie
December 14	Curtain	Agatha Christie
December 21	Curtain	Agatha Christie
December 28	Curtain	Agatha Christie

== Nonfiction ==
The following list ranks the number-one best-selling nonfiction books.

Date	Book	Author
January 5	All Things Bright and Beautiful	James Herriot
January 12	All Things Bright and Beautiful	James Herriot
January 19	All Things Bright and Beautiful	James Herriot
January 26	All Things Bright and Beautiful	James Herriot
February 2	The Bermuda Triangle	Charles Berlitz
February 9	The Bermuda Triangle	Charles Berlitz
February 16	The Palace Guard	Dan Rather and Gary Paul Gates
February 23	The Bermuda Triangle	Charles Berlitz
March 2	The Bermuda Triangle	Charles Berlitz
March 9	The Bermuda Triangle	Charles Berlitz
March 16	The Bermuda Triangle	Charles Berlitz
March 23	The Bermuda Triangle	Charles Berlitz
March 30	The Bermuda Triangle	Charles Berlitz
April 6	The Bermuda Triangle	Charles Berlitz
April 13	The Bermuda Triangle	Charles Berlitz
April 20	The Bermuda Triangle	Charles Berlitz
April 27	The Bermuda Triangle	Charles Berlitz
May 4	The Bermuda Triangle	Charles Berlitz
May 11	The Bermuda Triangle	Charles Berlitz
May 18	The Bermuda Triangle	Charles Berlitz
May 25	The Bermuda Triangle	Charles Berlitz
June 1	The Bermuda Triangle	Charles Berlitz
June 8	The Bermuda Triangle	Charles Berlitz
June 15	Breach of Faith	Theodore H. White
June 22	Breach of Faith	Theodore H. White
June 29	Breach of Faith	Theodore H. White
July 6	Breach of Faith	Theodore H. White
July 13	Breach of Faith	Theodore H. White
July 20	Breach of Faith	Theodore H. White
July 27	Breach of Faith	Theodore H. White
August 3	Breach of Faith	Theodore H. White
August 10	Breach of Faith	Theodore H. White
August 17	Breach of Faith	Theodore H. White
August 24	Breach of Faith	Theodore H. White
August 31	Breach of Faith	Theodore H. White
September 7	Sylvia Porter's Money Book	Sylvia Porter
September 14	Sylvia Porter's Money Book	Sylvia Porter
September 21	Sylvia Porter's Money Book	Sylvia Porter
September 28	Sylvia Porter's Money Book	Sylvia Porter
October 5	Sylvia Porter's Money Book	Sylvia Porter
October 12	Sylvia Porter's Money Book	Sylvia Porter
October 19	Sylvia Porter's Money Book	Sylvia Porter
October 26	Sylvia Porter's Money Book	Sylvia Porter
November 2	Sylvia Porter's Money Book	Sylvia Porter
November 9	Sylvia Porter's Money Book	Sylvia Porter
November 16	Sylvia Porter's Money Book	Sylvia Porter
November 23	Power!	Michael Korda
November 30	Bring on the Empty Horses	David Niven
December 7	Bring on the Empty Horses	David Niven
December 14	Sylvia Porter's Money Book	Sylvia Porter
December 21	The Relaxation Response	Herbert Benson
December 28	Bring on the Empty Horses	David Niven

== See also ==
- Publishers Weekly list of bestselling novels in the United States in the 1970s
