= List of The New York Times number-one books of 1971 =

This is a list of books that topped The New York Times best-seller list in 1971.

== Fiction ==
The following list ranks the number-one best-selling fiction books.

Date	Book	Author
January 3	Love Story	Erich Segal
January 10	Love Story	Erich Segal
January 17	Love Story	Erich Segal
January 24	Love Story	Erich Segal
January 31	Love Story	Erich Segal
February 7	Love Story	Erich Segal
February 14	Love Story	Erich Segal
February 21	QB VII	Leon Uris
February 28	QB VII	Leon Uris
March 7	QB VII	Leon Uris
March 14	QB VII	Leon Uris
March 21	QB VII	Leon Uris
March 28	QB VII	Leon Uris
April 4	QB VII	Leon Uris
April 11	QB VII	Leon Uris
April 18	QB VII	Leon Uris
April 25	The Passions of the Mind	Irving Stone
May 2	The Passions of the Mind	Irving Stone
May 9	The Passions of the Mind	Irving Stone
May 16	The Passions of the Mind	Irving Stone
May 23	The Passions of the Mind	Irving Stone
May 30	The Passions of the Mind	Irving Stone
June 6	The Passions of the Mind	Irving Stone
June 13	The Passions of the Mind	Irving Stone
June 20	The Passions of the Mind	Irving Stone
June 27	The Passions of the Mind	Irving Stone
July 4	The Passions of the Mind	Irving Stone
July 11	The Passions of the Mind	Irving Stone
July 18	The Passions of the Mind	Irving Stone
July 25	The Exorcist	William Peter Blatty
August 1	The Exorcist	William Peter Blatty
August 8	The Exorcist	William Peter Blatty
August 15	The Exorcist	William Peter Blatty
August 22	The Exorcist	William Peter Blatty
August 29	The Exorcist	William Peter Blatty
September 5	The Exorcist	William Peter Blatty
September 12	The Exorcist	William Peter Blatty
September 19	The Exorcist	William Peter Blatty
September 26	The Exorcist	William Peter Blatty
October 3	The Exorcist	William Peter Blatty
October 10	The Exorcist	William Peter Blatty
October 17	The Day of the Jackal	Frederick Forsyth
October 24	The Day of the Jackal	Frederick Forsyth
October 31	The Day of the Jackal	Frederick Forsyth
November 7	Wheels	Arthur Hailey
November 14	The Day of the Jackal	Frederick Forsyth
November 21	The Day of the Jackal	Frederick Forsyth
November 28	The Day of the Jackal	Frederick Forsyth
December 5	Wheels	Arthur Hailey
December 12	The Day of the Jackal	Frederick Forsyth
December 19	Wheels	Arthur Hailey
December 26	Wheels	Arthur Hailey

== Nonfiction ==
The following list ranks the number-one best-selling nonfiction books.

Date	Book	Author
January 3	Everything You Always Wanted to Know About Sex	David Reuben
January 10	Civilisation	Kenneth Clark
January 17	The Greening of America	Charles A. Reich
January 24	The Greening of America	Charles A. Reich
January 31	The Greening of America	Charles A. Reich
February 7	The Greening of America	Charles A. Reich
February 14	The Greening of America	Charles A. Reich
February 21	The Greening of America	Charles A. Reich
February 28	The Greening of America	Charles A. Reich
March 7	The Greening of America	Charles A. Reich
March 14	The Greening of America	Charles A. Reich
March 21	The Greening of America	Charles A. Reich
March 28	The Greening of America	Charles A. Reich
April 4	The Greening of America	Charles A. Reich
April 11	The Greening of America	Charles A. Reich
April 18	The Greening of America	Charles A. Reich
April 25	The Greening of America	Charles A. Reich
May 2	The Greening of America	Charles A. Reich
May 9	The Greening of America	Charles A. Reich
May 16	The Greening of America	Charles A. Reich
May 23	The Greening of America	Charles A. Reich
May 30	Bury My Heart at Wounded Knee	Dee Brown
June 6	Bury My Heart at Wounded Knee	Dee Brown
June 13	Bury My Heart at Wounded Knee	Dee Brown
June 20	Bury My Heart at Wounded Knee	Dee Brown
June 27	Bury My Heart at Wounded Knee	Dee Brown
July 4	Bury My Heart at Wounded Knee	Dee Brown
July 11	Bury My Heart at Wounded Knee	Dee Brown
July 18	Bury My Heart at Wounded Knee	Dee Brown
July 25	The Female Eunuch	Germaine Greer
August 1	Bury My Heart at Wounded Knee	Dee Brown
August 8	Bury My Heart at Wounded Knee	Dee Brown
August 15	Bury My Heart at Wounded Knee	Dee Brown
August 22	Bury My Heart at Wounded Knee	Dee Brown
August 29	Bury My Heart at Wounded Knee	Dee Brown
September 5	Bury My Heart at Wounded Knee	Dee Brown
September 12	Bury My Heart at Wounded Knee	Dee Brown
September 19	Bury My Heart at Wounded Knee	Dee Brown
September 26	Bury My Heart at Wounded Knee	Dee Brown
October 3	Bury My Heart at Wounded Knee	Dee Brown
October 10	Bury My Heart at Wounded Knee	Dee Brown
October 17	Bury My Heart at Wounded Knee	Dee Brown
October 24	Bury My Heart at Wounded Knee	Dee Brown
October 31	Bury My Heart at Wounded Knee	Dee Brown
November 7	Bury My Heart at Wounded Knee	Dee Brown
November 14	Bury My Heart at Wounded Knee	Dee Brown
November 21	Any Woman Can!	David Reuben
November 28	Honor Thy Father	Gay Talese
December 5	Eleanor and Franklin	Joseph P. Lash
December 12	Eleanor and Franklin	Joseph P. Lash
December 19	Eleanor and Franklin	Joseph P. Lash
December 26	Eleanor and Franklin	Joseph P. Lash

== See also ==
- Publishers Weekly list of bestselling novels in the United States in the 1970s
