= List of The New York Times number-one books of 1979 =

The American daily newspaper The New York Times publishes multiple weekly lists ranking the best-selling books in the United States.

== Fiction ==
The following list ranks the number-one best-selling fiction books, in the hardcover fiction category.

Date	Book	Author
January 7	Chesapeake	James Michener
January 14	Chesapeake	James Michener
January 21	Chesapeake	James Michener
January 28	Chesapeake	James Michener
February 4	Chesapeake	James Michener
February 11	Chesapeake	James Michener
February 18	War and Remembrance	Herman Wouk
February 25	Overload	Arthur Hailey
March 4	Chesapeake	James Michener
March 11	Chesapeake	James Michener
March 18	Overload	Arthur Hailey
March 25	War and Remembrance	Herman Wouk
April 1	War and Remembrance	Herman Wouk
April 8	The Matarese Circle	Robert Ludlum
April 15	Good as Gold	Joseph Heller
April 22	Good as Gold	Joseph Heller
April 29	The Matarese Circle	Robert Ludlum
May 6	The Matarese Circle	Robert Ludlum
May 13	The Matarese Circle	Robert Ludlum
May 20	The Matarese Circle	Robert Ludlum
May 27	The Matarese Circle	Robert Ludlum
June 3	The Matarese Circle	Robert Ludlum
June 10	The Matarese Circle	Robert Ludlum
June 17	The Matarese Circle	Robert Ludlum
June 24	The Matarese Circle	Robert Ludlum
July 1	The Matarese Circle	Robert Ludlum
July 8	The Matarese Circle	Robert Ludlum
July 15	The Matarese Circle	Robert Ludlum
July 22	Sophie's Choice	William Styron
July 29	Sophie's Choice	William Styron
August 5	The Matarese Circle	Robert Ludlum
August 12	Sophie's Choice	William Styron
August 19	Sophie's Choice	William Styron
August 26	Sophie's Choice	William Styron
September 2	Sophie's Choice	William Styron
September 9	The Last Enchantment	Mary Stewart
September 16	The Last Enchantment	Mary Stewart
September 23	The Last Enchantment	Mary Stewart
September 30	The Last Enchantment	Mary Stewart
October 7	Jailbird	Kurt Vonnegut
October 14	The Dead Zone	Stephen King
October 21	The Dead Zone	Stephen King
October 28	The Establishment	Howard Fast
November 4	Jailbird	Kurt Vonnegut
November 11	The Establishment	Howard Fast
November 18	The Establishment	Howard Fast
November 25	The Establishment	Howard Fast
December 2	The Establishment	Howard Fast
December 9	Triple	Ken Follett
December 16	Triple	Ken Follett
December 23	The Establishment	Howard Fast
December 30	Jailbird	Kurt Vonnegut

== Nonfiction ==
The following list ranks the number-one best-selling nonfiction books, in the hardcover nonfiction category.

Date	Book	Author
January 7	Mommie Dearest	Christina Crawford
January 14	Gnomes	text by Wil Huygen, illustrated by Rien Poortvliet
January 21	Mommie Dearest	Christina Crawford
January 28	Mommie Dearest	Christina Crawford
February 4	Mommie Dearest	Christina Crawford
February 11	Lauren Bacall by Myself	Lauren Bacall
February 18	Lauren Bacall by Myself	Lauren Bacall
February 25	Lauren Bacall by Myself	Lauren Bacall
March 4	Lauren Bacall by Myself	Lauren Bacall
March 11	Lauren Bacall by Myself	Lauren Bacall
March 18	Lauren Bacall by Myself	Lauren Bacall
March 25	Lauren Bacall by Myself	Lauren Bacall
April 1	The Complete Scarsdale Medical Diet	Herman Tarnower and Samm Sinclair Baker
April 8	The Complete Scarsdale Medical Diet	Herman Tarnower and Samm Sinclair Baker
April 15	The Complete Scarsdale Medical Diet	Herman Tarnower and Samm Sinclair Baker
April 22	The Complete Scarsdale Medical Diet	Herman Tarnower and Samm Sinclair Baker
April 29	The Complete Scarsdale Medical Diet	Herman Tarnower and Samm Sinclair Baker
May 6	The Complete Scarsdale Medical Diet	Herman Tarnower and Samm Sinclair Baker
May 13	The Complete Scarsdale Medical Diet	Herman Tarnower and Samm Sinclair Baker
May 20	The Complete Scarsdale Medical Diet	Herman Tarnower and Samm Sinclair Baker
May 27	The Complete Scarsdale Medical Diet	Herman Tarnower and Samm Sinclair Baker
June 3	The Complete Scarsdale Medical Diet	Herman Tarnower and Samm Sinclair Baker
June 10	The Complete Scarsdale Medical Diet	Herman Tarnower and Samm Sinclair Baker
June 17	The Complete Scarsdale Medical Diet	Herman Tarnower and Samm Sinclair Baker
June 24	The Complete Scarsdale Medical Diet	Herman Tarnower and Samm Sinclair Baker
July 1	The Complete Scarsdale Medical Diet	Herman Tarnower and Samm Sinclair Baker
July 8	The Complete Scarsdale Medical Diet	Herman Tarnower and Samm Sinclair Baker
July 15	The Complete Scarsdale Medical Diet	Herman Tarnower and Samm Sinclair Baker
July 22	Cruel Shoes	Steve Martin
July 29	The Complete Scarsdale Medical Diet	Herman Tarnower and Samm Sinclair Baker
August 5	The Complete Scarsdale Medical Diet	Herman Tarnower and Samm Sinclair Baker
August 12	The Complete Scarsdale Medical Diet	Herman Tarnower and Samm Sinclair Baker
August 19	The Complete Scarsdale Medical Diet	Herman Tarnower and Samm Sinclair Baker
August 26	The Complete Scarsdale Medical Diet	Herman Tarnower and Samm Sinclair Baker
September 2	The Complete Scarsdale Medical Diet	Herman Tarnower and Samm Sinclair Baker
September 9	The Complete Scarsdale Medical Diet	Herman Tarnower and Samm Sinclair Baker
September 16	The Complete Scarsdale Medical Diet	Herman Tarnower and Samm Sinclair Baker
September 23	The Complete Scarsdale Medical Diet	Herman Tarnower and Samm Sinclair Baker
September 30	The Complete Scarsdale Medical Diet	Herman Tarnower and Samm Sinclair Baker
October 7	The Complete Scarsdale Medical Diet	Herman Tarnower and Samm Sinclair Baker
October 14	The Complete Scarsdale Medical Diet	Herman Tarnower and Samm Sinclair Baker
October 21	The Complete Scarsdale Medical Diet	Herman Tarnower and Samm Sinclair Baker
October 28	Aunt Erma's Cope Book	Erma Bombeck
November 4	The Complete Scarsdale Medical Diet	Herman Tarnower and Samm Sinclair Baker
November 11	The Complete Scarsdale Medical Diet	Herman Tarnower and Samm Sinclair Baker
November 18	Aunt Erma's Cope Book	Erma Bombeck
November 25	Aunt Erma's Cope Book	Erma Bombeck
December 2	Aunt Erma's Cope Book	Erma Bombeck
December 9	Aunt Erma's Cope Book	Erma Bombeck
December 16	Aunt Erma's Cope Book	Erma Bombeck
December 23	Aunt Erma's Cope Book	Erma Bombeck
December 30	The Brethren	Bob Woodward and Scott Armstrong

== See also ==
- Publishers Weekly list of bestselling novels in the United States in the 1970s
