= List of The New York Times number-one books of 1974 =

This is a list of books that topped The New York Times best-seller list in 1974.

== Fiction ==
The following list ranks the number-one best-selling fiction books.

| Date | Book | Author |
|---|---|---|
| January 6 | Burr | Gore Vidal |
| January 13 | Burr | Gore Vidal |
| January 20 | Burr | Gore Vidal |
| January 27 | Burr | Gore Vidal |
| February 3 | Burr | Gore Vidal |
| February 10 | Burr | Gore Vidal |
| February 17 | Burr | Gore Vidal |
| February 24 | Burr | Gore Vidal |
| March 3 | Burr | Gore Vidal |
| March 10 | Burr | Gore Vidal |
| March 17 | Burr | Gore Vidal |
| March 24 | Burr | Gore Vidal |
| March 31 | Burr | Gore Vidal |
| April 7 | Burr | Gore Vidal |
| April 14 | Burr | Gore Vidal |
| April 21 | Burr | Gore Vidal |
| April 28 | Burr | Gore Vidal |
| May 5 | Watership Down | Richard Adams |
| May 12 | Watership Down | Richard Adams |
| May 19 | Watership Down | Richard Adams |
| May 26 | Watership Down | Richard Adams |
| June 2 | Watership Down | Richard Adams |
| June 9 | Watership Down | Richard Adams |
| June 16 | Watership Down | Richard Adams |
| June 23 | Watership Down | Richard Adams |
| June 30 | Watership Down | Richard Adams |
| July 7 | Watership Down | Richard Adams |
| July 14 | Watership Down | Richard Adams |
| July 21 | Watership Down | Richard Adams |
| July 28 | Watership Down | Richard Adams |
| August 4 | Tinker Tailor Soldier Spy | John le Carré |
| August 11 | Tinker Tailor Soldier Spy | John le Carré |
| August 18 | Tinker Tailor Soldier Spy | John le Carré |
| August 25 | Tinker Tailor Soldier Spy | John le Carré |
| September 1 | Tinker Tailor Soldier Spy | John le Carré |
| September 8 | Tinker Tailor Soldier Spy | John le Carré |
| September 15 | Tinker Tailor Soldier Spy | John le Carré |
| September 22 | Tinker Tailor Soldier Spy | John le Carré |
| September 29 | Tinker Tailor Soldier Spy | John le Carré |
| October 6 | Tinker Tailor Soldier Spy | John le Carré |
| October 13 | Centennial | James Michener |
| October 20 | Centennial | James Michener |
| October 27 | Centennial | James Michener |
| November 3 | Centennial | James Michener |
| November 10 | Centennial | James Michener |
| November 17 | Centennial | James Michener |
| November 24 | Centennial | James Michener |
| December 1 | Centennial | James Michener |
| December 8 | Centennial | James Michener |
| December 15 | Centennial | James Michener |
| December 22 | Centennial | James Michener |
| December 29 | Centennial | James Michener |

== Nonfiction ==
The following list ranks the number-one best-selling nonfiction books.

| Date | Book | Author |
|---|---|---|
| January 6 | Alistair Cooke's America | Alistair Cooke |
| January 13 | Alistair Cooke's America | Alistair Cooke |
| January 20 | Alistair Cooke's America | Alistair Cooke |
| January 27 | Alistair Cooke's America | Alistair Cooke |
| February 3 | Alistair Cooke's America | Alistair Cooke |
| February 10 | The Joy of Sex | Alex Comfort |
| February 17 | How to Be Your Own Best Friend | Mildred Newman and Bernard Berkowitz with Jean Owen |
| February 24 | Plain Speaking | Merle Miller |
| March 3 | Plain Speaking | Merle Miller |
| March 10 | Plain Speaking | Merle Miller |
| March 17 | Plain Speaking | Merle Miller |
| March 24 | Plain Speaking | Merle Miller |
| March 31 | Plain Speaking | Merle Miller |
| April 7 | Plain Speaking | Merle Miller |
| April 14 | Plain Speaking | Merle Miller |
| April 21 | Plain Speaking | Merle Miller |
| April 28 | You Can Profit from a Monetary Crisis | Harry Browne |
| May 5 | Plain Speaking | Merle Miller |
| May 12 | Plain Speaking | Merle Miller |
| May 19 | Times to Remember | Rose Fitzgerald Kennedy |
| May 26 | Times to Remember | Rose Fitzgerald Kennedy |
| June 2 | Times to Remember | Rose Fitzgerald Kennedy |
| June 9 | Times to Remember | Rose Fitzgerald Kennedy |
| June 16 | Times to Remember | Rose Fitzgerald Kennedy |
| June 23 | Times to Remember | Rose Fitzgerald Kennedy |
| June 30 | All the President's Men | Carl Bernstein and Bob Woodward |
| July 7 | All the President's Men | Carl Bernstein and Bob Woodward |
| July 14 | All the President's Men | Carl Bernstein and Bob Woodward |
| July 21 | All the President's Men | Carl Bernstein and Bob Woodward |
| July 28 | All the President's Men | Carl Bernstein and Bob Woodward |
| August 4 | All the President's Men | Carl Bernstein and Bob Woodward |
| August 11 | All the President's Men | Carl Bernstein and Bob Woodward |
| August 18 | All the President's Men | Carl Bernstein and Bob Woodward |
| August 25 | All the President's Men | Carl Bernstein and Bob Woodward |
| September 1 | All the President's Men | Carl Bernstein and Bob Woodward |
| September 8 | All the President's Men | Carl Bernstein and Bob Woodward |
| September 15 | All the President's Men | Carl Bernstein and Bob Woodward |
| September 22 | All the President's Men | Carl Bernstein and Bob Woodward |
| September 29 | All the President's Men | Carl Bernstein and Bob Woodward |
| October 6 | All the President's Men | Carl Bernstein and Bob Woodward |
| October 13 | All the President's Men | Carl Bernstein and Bob Woodward |
| October 20 | All the President's Men | Carl Bernstein and Bob Woodward |
| October 27 | All the President's Men | Carl Bernstein and Bob Woodward |
| November 3 | All the President's Men | Carl Bernstein and Bob Woodward |
| November 10 | All the President's Men | Carl Bernstein and Bob Woodward |
| November 17 | All Things Bright and Beautiful | James Herriot |
| November 24 | All Things Bright and Beautiful | James Herriot |
| December 1 | All Things Bright and Beautiful | James Herriot |
| December 8 | All Things Bright and Beautiful | James Herriot |
| December 15 | All Things Bright and Beautiful | James Herriot |
| December 22 | All Things Bright and Beautiful | James Herriot |
| December 29 | All Things Bright and Beautiful | James Herriot |

== See also ==
- Publishers Weekly list of bestselling novels in the United States in the 1970s
