= List of The New York Times number-one books of 1973 =

This is a list of books that topped The New York Times best-seller list in 1973.

== Fiction ==
The following list ranks the number-one best-selling fiction books.

Date	Book	Author
January 7	Jonathan Livingston Seagull	Richard Bach
January 14	Jonathan Livingston Seagull	Richard Bach
January 21	Jonathan Livingston Seagull	Richard Bach
January 28	Jonathan Livingston Seagull	Richard Bach
February 4	Jonathan Livingston Seagull	Richard Bach
February 11	Jonathan Livingston Seagull	Richard Bach
February 18	Jonathan Livingston Seagull	Richard Bach
February 25	Jonathan Livingston Seagull	Richard Bach
March 4	Jonathan Livingston Seagull	Richard Bach
March 11	Jonathan Livingston Seagull	Richard Bach
March 18	Jonathan Livingston Seagull	Richard Bach
March 25	The Odessa File	Frederick Forsyth
April 1	The Odessa File	Frederick Forsyth
April 8	The Odessa File	Frederick Forsyth
April 15	The Odessa File	Frederick Forsyth
April 22	The Odessa File	Frederick Forsyth
April 29	The Odessa File	Frederick Forsyth
May 6	Once Is Not Enough	Jacqueline Susann
May 13	Once Is Not Enough	Jacqueline Susann
May 20	Once Is Not Enough	Jacqueline Susann
May 27	Once Is Not Enough	Jacqueline Susann
June 3	Once Is Not Enough	Jacqueline Susann
June 10	Once Is Not Enough	Jacqueline Susann
June 17	Once Is Not Enough	Jacqueline Susann
June 24	Once Is Not Enough	Jacqueline Susann
July 1	Breakfast of Champions	Kurt Vonnegut
July 8	Breakfast of Champions	Kurt Vonnegut
July 15	Breakfast of Champions	Kurt Vonnegut
July 22	Breakfast of Champions	Kurt Vonnegut
July 29	Breakfast of Champions	Kurt Vonnegut
August 5	Breakfast of Champions	Kurt Vonnegut
August 12	Breakfast of Champions	Kurt Vonnegut
August 19	Breakfast of Champions	Kurt Vonnegut
August 26	Breakfast of Champions	Kurt Vonnegut
September 2	Breakfast of Champions	Kurt Vonnegut
September 9	The Hollow Hills	Mary Stewart
September 16	The Hollow Hills	Mary Stewart
September 23	The Hollow Hills	Mary Stewart
September 30	The Hollow Hills	Mary Stewart
October 7	The Hollow Hills	Mary Stewart
October 14	The Hollow Hills	Mary Stewart
October 21	The Hollow Hills	Mary Stewart
October 28	The Hollow Hills	Mary Stewart
November 4	The Hollow Hills	Mary Stewart
November 11	The Hollow Hills	Mary Stewart
November 18	The Hollow Hills	Mary Stewart
November 25	The Honorary Consul	Graham Greene
December 2	The Honorary Consul	Graham Greene
December 9	Burr	Gore Vidal
December 16	Burr	Gore Vidal
December 23	Burr	Gore Vidal
December 30	Burr	Gore Vidal

== Nonfiction ==
The following list ranks the number-one best-selling nonfiction books.

Date	Book	Author
January 7	I'm OK – You're OK	Thomas A. Harris
January 14	Harry S. Truman	Margaret Truman
January 21	The Best and the Brightest	David Halberstam
January 28	Harry S. Truman	Margaret Truman
February 4	The Best and the Brightest	David Halberstam
February 11	Harry S. Truman	Margaret Truman
February 18	Dr. Atkins' Diet Revolution	Robert Atkins
February 25	Dr. Atkins' Diet Revolution	Robert Atkins
March 4	Dr. Atkins' Diet Revolution	Robert Atkins
March 11	Dr. Atkins' Diet Revolution	Robert Atkins
March 18	Dr. Atkins' Diet Revolution	Robert Atkins
March 25	Dr. Atkins' Diet Revolution	Robert Atkins
April 1	Dr. Atkins' Diet Revolution	Robert Atkins
April 8	Dr. Atkins' Diet Revolution	Robert Atkins
April 15	Dr. Atkins' Diet Revolution	Robert Atkins
April 22	Dr. Atkins' Diet Revolution	Robert Atkins
April 29	Dr. Atkins' Diet Revolution	Robert Atkins
May 6	Dr. Atkins' Diet Revolution	Robert Atkins
May 13	Dr. Atkins' Diet Revolution	Robert Atkins
May 20	Dr. Atkins' Diet Revolution	Robert Atkins
May 27	Dr. Atkins' Diet Revolution	Robert Atkins
June 3	Dr. Atkins' Diet Revolution	Robert Atkins
June 10	Dr. Atkins' Diet Revolution	Robert Atkins
June 17	Dr. Atkins' Diet Revolution	Robert Atkins
June 24	Dr. Atkins' Diet Revolution	Robert Atkins
July 1	Dr. Atkins' Diet Revolution	Robert Atkins
July 8	Dr. Atkins' Diet Revolution	Robert Atkins
July 15	Dr. Atkins' Diet Revolution	Robert Atkins
July 22	Dr. Atkins' Diet Revolution	Robert Atkins
July 29	Dr. Atkins' Diet Revolution	Robert Atkins
August 5	The Joy of Sex	Alex Comfort
August 12	Dr. Atkins' Diet Revolution	Robert Atkins
August 19	Dr. Atkins' Diet Revolution	Robert Atkins
August 26	The Joy of Sex	Alex Comfort
September 2	Dr. Atkins' Diet Revolution	Robert Atkins
September 9	Dr. Atkins' Diet Revolution	Robert Atkins
September 16	The Joy of Sex	Alex Comfort
September 23	The Joy of Sex	Alex Comfort
September 30	The Joy of Sex	Alex Comfort
October 7	The Joy of Sex	Alex Comfort
October 14	How to Be Your Own Best Friend	Mildred Newman and Bernard Berkowitz with Jean Owen
October 21	The Joy of Sex	Alex Comfort
October 28	The Joy of Sex	Alex Comfort
November 4	How to Be Your Own Best Friend	Mildred Newman and Bernard Berkowitz with Jean Owen
November 11	The Joy of Sex	Alex Comfort
November 18	The Joy of Sex	Alex Comfort
November 25	How to Be Your Own Best Friend	Mildred Newman and Bernard Berkowitz with Jean Owen
December 2	How to Be Your Own Best Friend	Mildred Newman and Bernard Berkowitz with Jean Owen
December 9	Alistair Cooke's America	Alistair Cooke
December 16	Alistair Cooke's America	Alistair Cooke
December 23	Alistair Cooke's America	Alistair Cooke
December 30	Alistair Cooke's America	Alistair Cooke

== See also ==
- Publishers Weekly list of bestselling novels in the United States in the 1970s
