= Publishers Weekly list of bestselling novels in the United States in the 1970s =

This is a list of bestselling novels in the United States in the 1970s, as determined by Publishers Weekly. The list features the most popular novels of each year from 1970 through 1975.

The standards set for inclusion in the lists – which, for example, led to the exclusion of the novels in the Harry Potter series from the lists for the 1990s and 2000s – are currently unknown.

== 1970 ==
1. Love Story by Erich Segal
2. The French Lieutenant's Woman by John Fowles
3. Islands in the Stream by Ernest Hemingway
4. The Crystal Cave by Mary Stewart
5. Great Lion of God by Taylor Caldwell
6. QB VII by Leon Uris
7. The Gang That Couldn't Shoot Straight by Jimmy Breslin
8. The Secret Woman by Victoria Holt
9. Travels with My Aunt by Graham Greene
10. Rich Man, Poor Man by Irwin Shaw

== 1971 ==
1. Wheels by Arthur Hailey
2. The Exorcist by William P. Blatty
3. The Passions of the Mind by Irving Stone
4. The Day of the Jackal by Frederick Forsyth
5. The Betsy by Harold Robbins
6. Message from Malaga by Helen MacInnes
7. The Winds of War by Herman Wouk
8. The Drifters by James A. Michener
9. The Other by Tom Tryon
10. Rabbit Redux by John Updike

== 1972 ==
1. Jonathan Livingston Seagull by Richard Bach
2. August 1914 by Aleksandr Solzhenitsyn
3. The Odessa File by Frederick Forsyth
4. The Day of the Jackal by Frederick Forsyth
5. The Word by Irving Wallace
6. The Winds of War by Herman Wouk
7. Captains and the Kings by Taylor Caldwell
8. Two from Galilee by Marjorie Holmes
9. My Name is Asher Lev by Chaim Potok
10. Semi-Tough by Dan Jenkins

== 1973 ==
1. Jonathan Livingston Seagull by Richard Bach
2. Once Is Not Enough by Jacqueline Susann
3. Breakfast of Champions by Kurt Vonnegut
4. The Odessa File by Frederick Forsyth
5. Burr by Gore Vidal
6. The Hollow Hills by Mary Stewart
7. Evening in Byzantium by Irwin Shaw
8. The Matlock Paper by Robert Ludlum
9. The Billion Dollar Sure Thing by Paul E. Erdman
10. The Honorary Consul by Graham Greene

== 1974 ==
1. Centennial by James A. Michener
2. Watership Down by Richard Adams
3. Jaws by Peter Benchley
4. Tinker, Tailor, Soldier, Spy by John le Carré
5. Something Happened by Joseph Heller
6. The Dogs of War by Frederick Forsyth
7. The Pirate by Harold Robbins
8. I Heard the Owl Call My Name by Margaret Craven
9. The Seven-Per-Cent Solution by Nicholas Meyer
10. The Fan Club by Irving Wallace

== 1975 ==
1. Ragtime by E. L. Doctorow
2. The Moneychangers by Arthur Hailey
3. Curtain by Agatha Christie
4. Looking for Mr. Goodbar by Judith Rossner
5. The Choirboys by Joseph Wambaugh
6. The Eagle Has Landed by Jack Higgins
7. The Greek Treasure by Irving Stone
8. The Great Train Robbery by Michael Crichton
9. Shōgun by James Clavell
10. Humboldt's Gift by Saul Bellow

== 1976 ==
1. Trinity by Leon Uris
2. Sleeping Murder by Agatha Christie
3. Dolores by Jacqueline Susann
4. Storm Warning by Jack Higgins
5. The Deep by Peter Benchley
6. 1876 by Gore Vidal
7. Slapstick or Lonesome No More! by Kurt Vonnegut
8. The Lonely Lady by Harold Robbins
9. Touch Not the Cat by Mary Stewart
10. A Stranger in the Mirror by Sidney Sheldon

== 1977 ==
1. The Silmarillion by J. R. R. Tolkien and Christopher Tolkien
2. The Thorn Birds by Colleen McCullough
3. Illusions: The Adventures of a Reluctant Messiah by Richard Bach
4. The Honourable Schoolboy by John le Carré
5. Oliver's Story by Erich Segal
6. Dreams Die First by Harold Robbins
7. Beggarman, Thief by Irwin Shaw
8. How to Save Your Own Life by Erica Jong
9. Delta of Venus by Anaïs Nin
10. Daniel Martin by John Fowles

== 1978 ==
1. Chesapeake by James A. Michener
2. War and Remembrance by Herman Wouk
3. Fools Die by Mario Puzo
4. Bloodline by Sidney Sheldon
5. Scruples by Judith Krantz
6. Evergreen by Belva Plain
7. Illusions: The Adventures of a Reluctant Messiah by Richard Bach
8. The Holcroft Covenant by Robert Ludlum
9. Second Generation by Howard Fast
10. Eye of the Needle by Ken Follett

== 1979 ==
1. The Matarese Circle by Robert Ludlum
2. Sophie's Choice by William Styron
3. Overload by Arthur Hailey
4. Memories of Another Day by Harold Robbins
5. Jailbird by Kurt Vonnegut
6. The Dead Zone by Stephen King
7. The Last Enchantment by Mary Stewart
8. The Establishment by Howard Fast
9. The Third World War: August 1985 by John Hackett
10. Smiley's People by John le Carré
