= In High Places =

In High Places may refer to:

- In High Places (1943 film), a 1943 Italian film
- "In High Places" (song), a 1983 song by Mike Oldfield from his album Crises
- In High Places (Hailey novel), a 1962 novel by Arthur Hailey
- In High Places (Turtledove novel), a 2005 novel by Harry Turtledove

== See also ==
- Friends in High Places (disambiguation)
