= The Matarese Countdown =

1997 novel by Robert Ludlum

- The Matarese Countdown first edition cover.
- Author: Robert Ludlum
- Language: English
- Series: The Matarese Dynasty
- Genre: Thriller novel
- Publisher: Bantam Books
- Publication date: October 13, 1997
- Publication place: United States
- Media type: Print (Hardback & Paperback)
- Pages: 496 pp (first edition)
- ISBN: 0-553-10667-8
- OCLC: 37260848
- Dewey Decimal: 813/.54 21
- LC Class: PS3562.U26 M3 1997
- Preceded by: The Matarese Circle

The Matarese Countdown is an espionage thriller novel by Robert Ludlum. It is the sequel to The Matarese Circle.

== Plot ==
Like the legendary phoenix, the Materese are rising from the ashes and are regaining their former power.

The new leader of the Matarese is an enigmatic figure named Jan van der Meer Matareisen, according to himself the only legitimate grandchild of Baron Guillaume de Matarese, the founder of the Matarese group.

With the help of another shadowy figure known as Julian Guiderone a.k.a. "son of the shepherd boy," who seems to have survived the events recounted in "The Matarese Circle" nearly twenty years ago, they are hatching a new and diabolical plot to plunge the civilised world into total chaos.

Only one man, a consular operations operative known as Brandon Scofield a.k.a. Beowulf Agate, can stop them, but he has been retired for nearly twenty years. Brandon Scofield is once again sent into the field together with a CIA case officer, Cameron Pryce, but this time the enemy is more dangerous.
