= Annazette Chase =

American actress

- Born: Annecetta Williams; May 20, 1943 (age 83); Los Angeles, California, U.S.
- Years active: 1964–1984

Annazette Chase (born May 20, 1943) is an American actress. She is best known for her roles in the films The Mack (1973) and Truck Turner (1974). She also portrayed Muhammad Ali's wife Belinda in The Greatest (1977), in which Ali played himself. She began her career with uncredited bits in Chamber of Horrors (1966) and Hotel (1967). She was also in Part 2, Sounder (1976) and Blume in Love (1973).

Her last film to date was The Toy (1982) with Richard Pryor and Jackie Gleason. Chase was picked by Pryor to be in The Toy after they collaborated in The Mack.

Chase was in four episodes of Burke's Law with Gene Barry and two episodes of Ben Casey, as well as guest starring on Perry Mason, The Man from U.N.C.L.E., Dragnet (1967 TV series), Get Smart and The White Shadow. She made a guest appearance on Saturday Night Live on December 13, 1975, in a sketch with Dan Aykroyd. In 1971, Chase appeared in the 1971 television movie, Marriage: Year One. In 1979, she appeared the television movies Goldie and the Boxer and 11th Victim.

Chase was raised in San Luis Obispo, where her father ran a soul food restaurant, Sister's Inn. She used to help out in the restaurant and learned cooking there. According to Jet, Chase has resided in London as of 1982.

== Select filmography ==
- Don't Worry, We'll Think of a Title (1966)
- Chamber of Horrors (1966)
- Hotel (1967)
- The Mack (1973)
- Blume in Love (1973)
- Black Fist (1974)
- Truck Turner (1974)
- Part 2, Sounder (1976)
- The Rockford Files S2, E14 (1976)
- The Greatest (1977)
- Goldie and the Boxer (1979)
- The Toy (1982)
