= Harold Sylvester =

American actor

- Born: February 10, 1949 (age 77); New Orleans, Louisiana
- Years active: 1972–present

Harold Sylvester (born February 10, 1949) is an American film and television actor. He is known for portraying Griff on the sitcom Married... with Children.

== Early life and education ==
Harold Sylvester was born on February 10, 1949, in New Orleans, Louisiana. He is a graduate of New Orleans' St. Augustine High School. Turning down Harvard, Sylvester attended Tulane University on a basketball scholarship and graduated in 1972 with a degree in theater and psychology. He was the first African American to receive an athletic scholarship from Tulane.

== Career ==
Sylvester is best known for his role on the TV series Married... with Children as Griff, the co-worker and friend of Al Bundy at the shoe store. Sylvester's other TV roles include the miniseries Wheels (1978), Barnaby Jones (season 8, episode 4, "A Desperate Pursuit", 10/11/1979), the short-lived 1981 series Walking Tall, Today's F.B.I., Mary (1985), Shaky Ground, and A Different World as Dwayne Wayne's father, Woodson "Woodchuck" Wayne. The most recent TV show in which he starred was The Army Show. Sylvester had a recurring role on the TV series City of Angels. He has made guest appearances on shows, ranging from The Eddie Capra Mysteries to Hill Street Blues to Murder, She Wrote to NYPD Blue.

Sylvester's first Hollywood role was as Nathan, a lead character in Part 2, Sounder, the sequel to Sounder. His better-known film roles are in supporting roles in Fast Break (1979), An Officer and a Gentleman (1982), Uncommon Valor (1983), Innerspace (1987), and Corrina, Corrina (1994). Sylvester was a contract player for Universal Studios.

Sylvester wrote the screenplay for the 1998 TV movie Passing Glory. This screenplay was based on some of his experiences playing basketball in high school, including a groundbreaking game of St. Augustine High School's all-black team against Jesuit High School's all-white team.

The Amistad Research Center of New Orleans, Louisiana, maintains a collection of Sylvester's papers that document his correspondence, film and television scripts, and materials reflecting his involvement with the Free Southern Theater and his Blue Bayou Productions Company.

== Filmography ==
Year	Title	Role	Notes
1972	Night of the Strangler	Jim Bunch	
1976	Alex & the Gypsy	First Goon	
1976	Part 2, Sounder	Nathan	
1978	A Hero Ain't Nothin' but a Sandwich	Doctor	
1978	The Eddie Capra Mysteries	Bobby Jerome	Episode: "Breakout to Murder"
1979	Fast Break	D.C.	
1980	Inside Moves	Alvin Martin	
1982	An Officer and a Gentleman	Lionel Perryman	
1983	Uncommon Valor	Major Curtis Johnson	
1985	Vision Quest	Tanneran	
1985	Space Rage	Max Bryson	
1987	Innerspace	Pete Blanchard	
1989	Hit List	Brian Armstrong	
1992	In the Deep Woods	George Dunaway	TV movie
1994	Corrina, Corrina	Frank	
1997	The Sixth Man	James Tyler	
1999	Trippin'	Willie Reed	
2002	What Wouldn't Jesus Do?	God	TV Short
2003	Missing Brendan	Stan Wade	
2006	Nolaw	Sampson	
2011	Night Club	Grim Interviewer	
2014	A Place for Heroes	Gary	
2025	The Pitt	Willie Alexander	Episode: "2:00 P.M."
