= Herbert Benson =

American medical doctor (1935–2022)

- Born: April 24, 1935; Yonkers, New York, U.S.
- Died: February 3, 2022 (aged 86); Boston, Massachusetts, U.S.
- Education: Harvard Medical School
- Known for: Great Prayer Experiment; Benson-Henry Institute; The Relaxation Response
- Spouse: Marilyn Benson
- Children: 2, Jennifer and Gregory
- Scientific career
- Fields: Medicine, physiology
- Workplaces: Harvard Medical School; Beth Israel Hospital; Massachusetts General Hospital; Andover Newton Theological School

Herbert Benson (April 24, 1935 – February 3, 2022) was an American medical doctor, cardiologist, and founder of the Mind/Body Medical Institute at Massachusetts General Hospital (MGH) in Boston. He was a professor of mind/body medicine at Harvard Medical School and director emeritus of the Benson-Henry Institute (BHI) at MGH. He was a founding trustee of The American Institute of Stress. He contributed more than 190 scientific publications and 12 books. More than five million copies of his books have been printed in different languages.

Started in 1998, Benson became the leader of the so-called "Great Prayer Experiment," or technically the "Study of the Therapeutic Effects of Intercessory Prayer (STEP)." The result published in 2006 concluded that intercessory prayer has no beneficial effect on patients with coronary artery bypass graft surgery. He, however, continued to believe that prayer has positive health benefits.

Benson coined relaxation response (and wrote a book by the same title) as a scientific term for the reversion of the physical stress response that can be elicited by meditation, and he used it to describe the ability of the body to stimulate relaxation of muscle and organs.

== Biography ==
Benson was born on April 24, 1935, in Yonkers, New York. He graduated with B.A. in biology from Wesleyan University in 1957. He entered a medical course at Harvard Medical School and earned his MD degree in 1961. He continued postdoctoral programs at King County Hospital, Seattle; University Hospital, University of Washington, Seattle; National Heart Institute, Bethesda; University of Puerto Rico; and Thorndike Memorial Laboratory, Boston City Hospital. In 1969 he was appointed instructor in physiology and later instructor in medicine at Harvard Medical School. He was promoted to assistant professor of medicine the next year. From 1972 he became associate professor. He was appointed associate professor at the Beth Israel Hospital in 1977, the post he held until 1987. Then he returned to the medical faculty at Harvard. With the establishment of Mind/Body Medical Institute at Harvard in 1992, he became associate professor, and then full professor. He was a practicing physician at Beth Israel Hospital from 1974. Between 1990 and 1997 he was lecturer in medicine and religion at Andover Newton Theological School, Newton Centre.

Benson became founding president of the Mind/Body Medical Institute of Harvard Medical School in 1988. He founded the Benson-Henry Institute for Mind Body Medicine of the Massachusetts General Hospital in 2006, where he became its director.

Benson died from heart disease and kidney failure at Beth Israel Deaconess Medical Center in Boston, on February 3, 2022, at the age of 86.

== Notable projects ==
=== Mind body medicine ===
In the 1960s at Harvard Medical School, Benson pioneered mind-body research, focusing on stress and the relaxation response in medicine. In his research, the mind and body are one system, in which meditation can play a significant role in reducing stress responses. He continued to pioneer medical research into bodymind questions. He introduced the term relaxation response as a scientific alternative for meditation. According to him, relaxation response is the ability of the body to induce decreased activity of muscle and organs. It is an opposite reaction to the fight-or-flight response. With Robert Keith Wallace, he observed that Transcendental Meditation reduced metabolism, rate of breathing, heart rate, and brain activity.

=== Intercessory prayer ===
In 1998, Benson started a research project on the efficacy of prayer among patients undergoing coronary artery bypass graft (CABG) surgery. The project, funded by the John Templeton Foundation, was explicit that its objective was not to prove or disprove the existence of God. This "Study of the Therapeutic Effects of Intercessory Prayer (STEP)" became popularly known as the "Great Prayer Experiment" and was described as "the most intense investigation ever undertaken of whether prayer can help to heal illness." The trial attempted to differentiate among outcomes in three groups of patients: (1) those uncertain of whether they were being prayed for, who were; (2) those uncertain of whether they were being prayed for, who were not; and (3) those being prayed for who were certain of it. The conclusion, published in 2006, was that intercessory prayer has no beneficial effect on CABG patients. Indeed, certainty of receiving intercessory prayer was actually associated with a higher incidence of complications.

== Personal life ==
Benson married Marilyn Benson, and they had three children, Jennifer, Gregory and Steven.

== Awards and honours ==
- Mosby Scholarship Award of Harvard Medical School in 1961
- DHL (honorary) from Becker College in 1997, from Lasell College in 2002, and from Massachusetts School of Professional Psychology 2007
- Medical Foundation Fellowship during 1967–1969
- Fellow of the American College of Cardiology in 1976
- Medical Self-Care Award for 1976
- Honorary President, Chinese Society of Behavioral Medicine and Biofeedback in 1988
- Distinguished Alumnus Award of Wesleyan University in 1992
- DPS (honorary) from Cedar Crest College in 2000
- Hans Selye Award of 2000
- National Samaritan Award from The Samaritan Institute in 2002
- Mani Bhaumik Award from The Cousins Center for Psychoneuroimmunology at UCLA, California, in 2009

== Publications ==
- The Relaxation Response, 1975. ISBN 978-0-688-02955-5
- The Mind/Body Effect: How behavioral medicine can show you the way to better health, 1979. ISBN 978-0-671-24143-8
- Beyond the Relaxation Response, 1984
- Your Maximum Mind, 1987
- 'Contributor' - MindScience: An East-West Dialogue Daniel Goleman and Robert A. F. Thurman Editors, Wisdom Publications, 1991. ISBN 978-0-86171-066-9
- The Wellness Book, 1992
- Timeless Healing: The Power and Biology of Belief, 1996. ISBN 978-0-7881-5775-2
- The Relaxation Response - Updated and Expanded (25th Anniversary Edition), 2000
- The Breakout Principle, 2003
- Mind Over Menopause, 2004
- Mind Your Heart, 2004. ISBN 978-0-7432-3702-4
- The Harvard Medical School Guide to Lowering Your Blood Pressure, 2006. ISBN 978-0-07-144801-7
- Relaxation Revolution, 2010. ISBN 978-1-4391-4865-5
