= Friends in High Places =

Friends in High Places may refer to:

- Friends in High Places (George Jones album), 1991
- Friends in High Places (Hillsong album), 1995

== See also ==
- In High Places (disambiguation)
- Friends in Low Places (disambiguation)
