= Detective (novel) =

Novel by Arthur Hailey

- First edition
- Author: Arthur Hailey
- Publisher: Crown
- Publication date: July 1, 1997
- ISBN: 0-517-70025-5

Detective is a 1997 novel by Canadian writer Arthur Hailey, the author's last book. Hailey depicts the work of a homicide department and its investigation methods.

== Plot ==
Detective is the story of Miami Police detective Malcolm Ainslie, who had previously trained to be a Catholic priest. A serial killer is on the loose in Miami. He is a religious fanatic and he starts killing people because he believes he is God's avenger. He leaves symbols from the Book of Revelation at the crime scenes.

Miami Police Detective Sergeant Malcolm Ainslie and his team start to investigate the murders. They eventually find the killer and arrest him. The murderer is nicknamed The Animal because he kills in such a barbaric manner. Now, when this man is about to be executed for the serial for the serial killings he committed, he calls for Malcolm. 30 minutes before his execution he confesses to Malcolm that he did all the serial killings he is accused of except one, which was not done by him.

It was the killing of the city commissioner and his wife. Malcolm, at first, refuses to believe him because The Animal has a reputation for being a liar. But as he delves deeper into the case files and studies all the killings he discovers that there are two killings in separate cities, unsolved murders which were confessed by The Animal.

When he carefully studies all the killings done by him, he finds out that the killings of city commissioner and his wife were attempted by someone else, a copy cat killer, and these murders were made to look as if done by the same killer. Thanks to his priestly training, he notices that the pattern of the symbols left by the Animal at scenes of all the other murders is derived from the Book of Revelation, but that the symbols left at the murder of the Mayor do not fit this pattern.

Malcolm suddenly finds himself facing a situation where a copy cat killer is roaming around free. And when the killings are of a city commissioner and his wife the matter became more complicated. His team starts to investigate and finds important people involved in the killings and a famous novelist is also involved.

== Reception ==
Detective received reviews from Booklist, the Chicago Tribune, Kirkus Reviews, and Publishers Weekly.

== Television adaptation ==
Detective (also known as Arthur Hailey's Detective) was adapted into a television movie for Hallmark Channel in 2005, directed by David S. Cass Sr., and with a cast that included Tom Berenger (as Malcolm Ainslie), Cybill Shepherd (as Karen Ainslie), Annabeth Gish (as Cynthia Ernst), Rick Gomez (as Detective Rodriguez), Frank Whaley (as Brewmaster), Wanda De Jesus (as Sanchez), J. Karen Thomas (as Ruby Bowe), Charles Durning (as Max Ernst), Sean O'Bryan (as Elroy Doil), and Rutanya Alda (as Judge Agannis).
