= Part 2, Sounder =

- Directed by: William A. Graham
- Screenplay by: Lonne Elder III
- Based on: Sounder by William H. Armstrong
- Produced by: Terry D. Nelson; Robert B. Radnitz (uncredited)
- Starring: Harold Sylvester; Ebony Wright; Taj Mahal; Annazette Chase; Darryl Young
- Cinematography: Urs Furrer
- Edited by: Sidney Levin
- Music by: Taj Mahal
- Production company: Radnitz/Mattel Productions
- Release date: October 13, 1976
- Running time: 98 minutes
- Country: United States
- Language: English

Part 2, Sounder is a 1976 American drama film directed by William A. Graham. It is the sequel to the 1972 Oscar-nominated film Sounder, which in turn is based on William H. Armstrong's Newbery Award-winning novel of the same name.

Although Lonne Elder III and Robert B. Radnitz returned as screenwriter and producer respectively, neither Martin Ritt nor any of the cast members from the first film participated in the sequel, with the exception of Ted Airhart who reprised his role as Mr. Perkins and Taj Mahal, who reprised his role as Ike and returned as composer. According to Bob McCann, the film was "barely released."

== Cast ==
- Harold Sylvester as Nathan Lee Morgan
- Ebony Wright as Rebecca Morgan
- Taj Mahal as Ike Phillips
- Darryl Young as David Lee Morgan
- Erica Young as Josie Mae
- Ted Airhart as Mr. Perkins
- Annazette Chase as Camille Johnson

== Release ==
The film had its world premiere on October 13, 1976 in New York City and also opened in selected theatres in New Jersey and Connecticut. It opened nationwide on October 15 in Atlanta, Boston, Cleveland, Dallas, Houston, Los Angeles, Pittsburgh, San Francisco and Washington D.C.

== Reception ==
Roger Ebert gave the film two stars. Richard Eder, reviewing the film for The New York Times, called it "unrelievedly didactic" and "a depressed kind of film, with a lot of gloominess and teeth-gritting".
