= Friends in Low Places (disambiguation) =

"Friends in Low Places" is a song by Garth Brooks.

Friends in Low Places may also refer to:

- Friends in Low Places (novel), a 1965 Alms for Oblivion novel by Simon Raven
- "Friends in Low Places" (I'm with Her), a 2004 television episode
- "Friends in Low Places" (Orange Is the New Black), a 2016 television episode
- "Friends in Low Places" (Wynonna Earp), a 2020 television episode

== See also ==
- Friends in High Places (disambiguation)
