= Hotel (Hailey novel) =

1965 novel by Arthur Hailey

- First edition (Doubleday)
- Author: Arthur Hailey
- Publisher: Doubleday
- Publication date: 22 December 1965
- ISBN: 978-0-385-03222-3

Hotel is a 1965 novel by Arthur Hailey. It is the story of an independent New Orleans hotel, the St. Gregory, and features a number of plots, several of which converge. These plot lines include the management's struggle to regain profitability and avoid being assimilated into the fictional O'Keefe chain of hotels, the racial integration of the hotel, and a hit and run homicide, a hotel burglar, and the day-to-day struggles of a large hotel. The St. Gregory is supposedly based on several hotels, including the Roosevelt Hotel, although the old St. Charles Hotel is also cited as the basis for the novel. The book was briefly a best-seller in 1965.

== Plot ==
The primary protagonist of the novel is Peter McDermott, a capable and well-qualified general manager once fired for sleeping with a hotel guest at the Waldorf Astoria New York. The novel opens with a group of teen-aged boys (the sons of the local banker, car dealer, and other town notables) attemping to gang rape 17 year old Marsh Preyscott, the daughter of a department store magnate, who is currently in Rome. Aloysius Royce (the only black man allowed in the hotel and valet to Warren Trent) alerts Peter McDermott and attempts to save Marsha. At Marsha's urging, Peter eventually tracks them down and asks for a written apology from each of the boys.

The Duke and Duchess of Croydon have recently checked into the hotel and are responsible for a gruesome hit-and-run accident. But the chief house officer Ogilvie notices the damage to their car and tries to blackmail the Duke and Duchess. They finally reach an agreement that Ogilvie would drive their Jaguar to Chicago and a total of twenty-five thousand dollars would be paid to him. Towards the end of the novel, as Ogilvie is driving the car out of hotel, Peter enters the hotel garage and they make eye contact.

The hotel's has failed to generate revenue and mortgage is due on Friday, five days from the start of the book. Curtis O'Keefe, who owns a large hotel chain, plans to buy the St. Gregory hotel. Curtis O'Keefe, an evangelical christian multi-millionaire, arrives at the hotel with Dodo, his naive but humble girlfriend. Warren Trent, the owner of the hotel, attempts to make a deal with the corrupt Journeyman's Union to give them control over the hotel as a union shop. Christine is Warren Trent's secretary and a love interest for Peter. In the hotel, an elderly guest, Mr. Albert Wells, suffers a medical problem in his room. The hotel staff is alert and quickly moves him to another room. Christine begins doting on Mr Wells following his recovery. Concurrently, Marsha later falls in ‘love’ with Peter McDermott and proposes marriage, which he turns down after some thought.

A major convention of dentists was supposed to be held in the St. Gregory. Dr. Nicholas, a "prominent Negro dentist" and university lecturer, arrives at the counter, showing a confirmed reservation. However hotel policy has refused to desegregate despite the 1964 Civil Rights Act. The Board President threatens to take the convention out of the hotel. When Peter discussed it with Warren, he said that after a few discussions this would be forgotten, the convention would be held, and there was no need to worry. And after a few meetings the convention finally decided to stay, though Dr. Ingram resigned from his post. In the meantime, the Journeyman's Union goes back on their handshake agreement to purchase the hotel.

Throughout this series of events, a hotel thief "Keycase Milne" is operating in the St. Gregory. Following a multi day crime spree, he notices the Duke and Duchess in the hotel and steals fifteen thousand dollars in cash and some jewelry from the Duchess's room.

A few minutes before Friday noon, the bank manager who had turned down refinancing of the hotel, came with an offer, that an individual, whose name could not be disclosed then, would be paying the mortgage and buying the major shares of the hotel. Warren Trent would be the chairman, though Warren knew that he would be just a figurehead, but as it was a better offer, so he accepted.

The buyer is revealed to be Mr. Albert Wells, the meek and fastidious guest whom Christine and Peter have become close to. Peter appointed the Executive Vice-President of the St. Gregory. Warren tells Curtis that he is not going to accept Curtis' offer to sell the hotel. Curtis, in a fit of anger, breaks up with Dodo. A corrupt head Bellhop, Dodo, Duke, Keycase, and several other passengers board a defective elevator. During the meeting Christine comes running and tells them that elevator number 4 has met with an accident and had a free fall, killing several guest and the elevator operator.

Dodo, suffering from serious injuries, is rushed to a hospital. It is then that Curtis realizes how much he loves Dodo and gets the best neurosurgeons for her. She is soon out of danger. The Duke was killed instantly. Herbie Chandler, the bell captain, is permanently paralyzed and will never work again. Keycase escapes unharmed and runs away with all his money but is caught in a traffic stop. Aloysius Royce leaves the hotel to study law and the novel ends with he and McDermott having a drink together.

== Characters ==
- Peter McDermott, manager
- Warren Trent, proprietor
- Christine Francis, secretary to Warren Trent
- Herbie Chandler, villainous Bell Captain
- Aloysius Royce, administrative assistant to Warren Trent
- Curtis O'Keefe, owner of the O'Keefe chain
- Dorothy "Dodo" Lash, O'Keefe's starlet companion
- Albert Wells, aging hotel guest
- The Duke and Duchess of Croydon, guests in the Presidential Suite
- Ogilvie, house detective
- Julius "Keycase" Milne, hotel thief
- Marsha Preyscott, one night guest in the hotel
- Noble (last name uncertain), #4 Elevator worker

== Background ==
Hailey worked on the novel for two and a half years, finishing in June 1964. He says his wife Sheila was of great assistance with the research. The book clubs, essential for sales of Hailey's book, originally rejected the novel. However, when the book was read in galleys three studios bid on the movie rights and it was sold to Warner Bros who wanted Hailey to write the screenplay. The book became a best seller, Hailey's most successful to date.

== Structure of novel ==
The novel features multiple unfolding plot lines which take place over a period of five weekdays, Monday through Friday. Some days feature self-contained episodes exploring particular elements of the routine of a large hotel in detail. Meg Yetmein, the cleaning lady, "gets hers back" by smuggling out steaks under her clothing toward the end of her shift; Tom Earlshore, the fired bartender, does much the same by "skimming" liquor. Other brief episodes explain techniques used by prostitutes in entering and exiting the hotel undetected, and the various methods used by the hotel thief.

== Adaptations ==
The novel was adapted into a movie in 1967, and in 1983 Aaron Spelling turned it into a television series, airing for five years on ABC. In the TV series the St. Gregory Hotel was moved from New Orleans to San Francisco.
