= Strong Medicine (novel) =

Book by Arthur Hailey

- Front cover
- Author: Arthur Hailey
- Language: English
- Publisher: Doubleday
- Publication date: 1984
- ISBN: 0-385-18014-4
- OCLC: 13117701

Strong Medicine is a 1984 novel by Arthur Hailey about the pharmaceutical industry. It was the thirteenth highest-selling novel of that year.

== Plot summary ==
A young woman is dying from a dangerous new strain of Hepatitis, unfamiliar to her doctor Andrew Jordan. A major pharmaceutical company is researching a drug that will combat the symptoms, and one of its sales reps, Celia, smuggles out a sample of it, which saves the patient’s life. Andrew and Celia are drawn together by this experience, and they get married.

At the annual conference, Celia delivers a critical report about the company’s poor standards of training and ethical conduct and is nearly fired by the company president Eli, until her line manager Sam intervenes on her behalf. Soon, Eli steps down through illness, and Celia is summoned to his deathbed, where he urges her always to follow her conscience.

Sam now becomes president, working closely with Celia, and launches two major overseas initiatives. One is an English unit, headed by Martin, a Cambridge scholar researching memory loss and dementia, from which his late mother had suffered. The other is a French project for an antiemetic for use in pregnancy, called Montayne. Celia’s reservations about the Montayne project are so serious that she follows Eli’s deathbed advice and resigns from her job, only to be called back when it's alarming flaws are revealed. Not only was there a blackmail scandal involving licensing, but Sam had given the drug to his pregnant daughter, resulting in his grandchild being severely (and permanently) disabled. Devastated, Sam commits suicide and Celia becomes president.

The company is having to endure a Senate Inquiry into the Montayne disaster, initiated by the corrupt Senator Donaghue. But it is also enjoying much prestige owing to the success of Martin’s team, which has developed a memory enhancing peptide. Also, one of Celia’s rivals in the company, Dr. Vincent Lord, has discovered a free radical quenching drug of great promise, until it is revealed that some of the research was falsified, and Lord tries to cover it up. Senator Donaghue relishes this new opportunity to damage the company’s reputation... And we find that we already know the conclusion, revealed in the novel’s cryptic opening section.

== Review ==
Patricia Y. Morton, in a review for Library Journal, describes it as a "slick, contemporary novel" but criticises the heroine as unrealistic. David Woods, writing in the Canadian Medical Association Journal, comments that the novel is unusual in its broadly "favourable" treatment of the pharmaceutical industry, but criticises the "cardboard" characterisations.

== On television ==
The novel was made into a TV film in 1986 starring Pamela Sue Martin (as Celia Grey), Patrick Duffy (as Andrew Jordan), Dick Van Dyke (as Sam Hawthorne), Sam Neill (as Vince Lord), Ben Cross (as Martin Taylor), Douglas Fairbanks Jr. (as Eli Camperdown), Gayle Hunnicutt (as Lillian Hawthorne), and Annette O'Toole (as Jessica Weitz).

A review by John J. O'Connor, in the New York Times, describes the adaptation as "a prescription for prolonged stupefaction" and criticises the lack of representation of African-Americans.
