= Hotel (1967 film) =

1967 film directed by Richard Quine

- Theatrical release poster
- Directed by: Richard Quine
- Screenplay by: Wendell Mayes
- Based on: Hotel (1965 novel) by Arthur Hailey
- Produced by: Wendell Mayes
- Starring: Rod Taylor; Catherine Spaak; Karl Malden; Kevin McCarthy; Michael Rennie; Melvyn Douglas
- Cinematography: Charles Lang
- Edited by: Sam O'Steen
- Music by: Johnny Keating
- Distributed by: Warner Bros. Pictures
- Release date: January 19, 1967
- Running time: 124 minutes
- Country: United States
- Language: English
- Budget: $3,651,000
- Box office: $3,000,000 (US/ Canada)

Hotel is a 1967 American drama film directed by Richard Quine, about the staff and guests of a fictional New Orleans hotel. It is based on the 1965 novel by Arthur Hailey, written for the screen and produced by Wendell Mayes. It stars an ensemble cast, featuring Rod Taylor, Catherine Spaak, Karl Malden, Kevin McCarthy, Michael Rennie, Merle Oberon, and Melvyn Douglas.

The film was released by Warner Bros. Pictures on January 19, 1967. A television series based on the film and novel premiered on ABC in 1983.

== Plot ==
The story takes place at the fictional St Gregory Hotel in New Orleans, owned by Warren Trent.

The hotel is in serious financial trouble. Manager Peter McDermott involves himself in proposals from three potential buyers: Curtis O'Keefe of O'Keefe's Hotels, a union that would protect current employees and could afford the repairs the old building needs so badly, and a developer who would demolish it and build a skyscraper. He also deals with a wide range of problems, including a faulty elevator.

O'Keefe, who intends to "modernize" the St. Gregory, visualizes a hotel of the future with conveyor belts everywhere. McDermott and O'Keefe's French mistress, Jeanne Rochefort, are immediately attracted to each other.

Among the guests at the hotel are the Duke and Duchess of Lanbourne, a wealthy British couple hiding out after fleeing from a hit and run accident in which the Duke killed a child. Dupere, the hotel detective, attempts to blackmail them. The Duchess asks him to drive their car to Washington, D.C., for $25,000 ($241,000 today), but he gets caught outside of the city.

Keycase, a professional thief, works the hotel using a range of techniques, including some female accomplices from strip clubs. In the beginning of the film, he picks up a key discarded in an ashtray at the airport. During the course of the film, he sneaks into rooms to steal the guests' money, but now that they can use credit cards, he finds that most carry very little cash.

Dr. Elmo Adams and his wife, a black couple, attempt to check in. The bigoted Trent tells the assistant manager filling in for McDermott (who has a rendezvous with Jeanne at his French Quarter apartment) to deny them accommodation. When McDermott finds out, he is furious. He traces them to another hotel and offers them their room. When he arrives to pick them up, they have vanished. The black desk clerk asks if they are “deseg”ing the St. Gregory. McDermott tells him to send him an application.

McDermott meets with the NAACP. The St. Gregory is not a target. They are pleased to learn that the bar is down, that Trent must live with it. But the union representative calls: An article about the Adamses in the (fictional) Washington Herald has killed their deal.

Trent brings McDermott along to hear O'Keefe's final offer. During the meeting, McDermott gets a call from the NAACP. Adams is an imposter, a bellhop who works for an O'Keefe Hotel, flown in to kill the union deal. McDermott exposes the lies behind the offer, adding that O'Keefe bribed him to convince Trent. Trent walks out on O'Keefe. He will sell to the developers.

The Duke calls the police, planning to turn himself in. Interrupted by a housekeeper in the Duke and Duchess' suite, Keycase grabs an attaché case and splits. In his room, he finds it is filled with the cash to pay off Dupere.

Keycase heads for the elevator, joined by the Duke and others. The elevator stops between floors: Emergency brakes begin to fail. McDermott and his assistant manager take the adjacent elevator to the same level and transfer passengers through the ceilings until the Duke and Keycase remain. Keycase refuses to leave the stolen money. The Duke wrestles the case away and helps Keycase out of the car; the brakes fail, sending the Duke to his death with the money.

The Duchess tells police she was responsible for the accident, hoping to save her late husband's reputation. She saves Dupere by confessing that she hired him to drive the car to Washington, D.C.: He knew nothing about the crime. The detectives do not press charges. Keycase is recognized and arrested.

The elevator crash triggers an exodus from the hotel, now facing certain closure. McDermott buys the remaining guests, including Jeanne, drinks on the house in a final toast to the St. Gregory.

== Cast ==
- Rod Taylor as Peter McDermott, manager
- Catherine Spaak as Jeanne Rochefort, O'Keefe's mistress
- Karl Malden as Keycase Milne, thief
- Melvyn Douglas as Warren Trent, owner
- Richard Conte as crooked house detective Dupere
- Merle Oberon as the Duchess Caroline
- Michael Rennie as the Duke of Lanbourne
- Kevin McCarthy as Curtis O'Keefe, bidder
- Carmen McRae as Christine, hotel chanteuse
- Alfred Ryder as Capt. Yolles
- Roy Roberts as Bailey
- Al Checco as Herbie Chandler
- Sheila Bromley as Mrs. Grandin
- Harry Hickox as Sam
- William Lanteau as Mason
- Ken Lynch as Joe Laswell, union bidder
- Clinton Sundberg as Lawrence Morgan
- Tol Avery as Kilbrick
- Davis Roberts as Dr. Elmo Adams
- Judy Norton as Daughter

Uncredited

- Annazette Chase as Mrs. Adams
- Napoleon Whiting as Waiter
- Angelique Pettyjohn as Stripper

== Production ==
Wendell Mayes produced the film and wrote the script. He later said:

The studio felt that Richard Quine and I would get along well together, which we did, so he came in as director. We had a terrible time casting it. It was one of those situations where the studio wants to make a picture because they need something to take care of their overhead. They had nothing shooting, so we had to move very quickly in the casting. We all recognized that it was an old-fashioned formula picture, and perhaps if we had had bigger stars, it would have gone at the box office as well as Airport [1970]. I am very fond of Hotel, but afterwards, I swore I'd never produce anything again.

Arthur Hailey was originally hired to write the screenplay, but was replaced by Stewart Stern and then Mayes. The film was shot mostly on a large set at the Warner Bros. studio backlot in Burbank, California, with a week of location shooting in New Orleans.

== Reception ==
=== Critical response ===
Hotel has a 100% rating on Rotten Tomatoes based on six reviews. Variety called the film "a very well made, handsomely produced drama" and said that Spaak "is charming and sexy" in her American film debut.

== See also ==
- Hotel (novel)
- Hotel (American TV series)
- List of American films of 1967
