= The Relaxation Response =

1975 book by Herbert Benson

- 1975 edition
- Author: Herbert Benson and Miriam Z. Klipper
- Language: English
- Publisher: William Morrow & Company
- Publication date: 1975
- Publication place: USA
- Pages: 158
- ISBN: 978-0-380-81595-1

The Relaxation Response is a book written in 1975 by Herbert Benson, a Harvard physician, and Miriam Z. Klipper. The response described in the book is an autonomic reaction elicited by a mental device and a passive attitude that has been used for altered states of consciousness throughout various religious traditions and cultures. The scientific characterization of the relaxation response was initially prompted by research studies on Transcendental Meditation ("TM"), a yogic meditation technique, that was presented primarily to people in the Western world.

== Origin ==
Benson writes in his book, "We claim no innovation but simply a scientific validation of age-old wisdom". People from the Transcendental Meditation movement, who felt they could reduce blood pressure using TM, visited Harvard Medical School in 1968, asking to be studied. The school, which at the time was studying the relationship of monkeys' behavior and blood pressure, told them "No, thank you." But when they persisted, Benson told them he would study them. He met with Maharishi Mahesh Yogi first to find out if he could agree in advance to any outcome, which Mahesh did. Benson mentions in his book that independent studies were already underway by then-PhD candidate R. Keith Wallace working with Archie Wilson at the University of California, Los Angeles, but that no published studies of TM existed. Benson's study found that when the subjects meditated, their metabolic rate markedly decreased in a matter of minutes. Further studies on subjects with high blood pressure showed that meditation over several weeks lowered blood pressure by a statistically significant amount.

== Eliciting the response ==
Benson's website and his book describe four essential components of meditation needed to bring about the response: a mental device (a simple word, phrase or activity to repeat to keep the mind from wandering), a passive attitude, a quiet environment, and a comfortable position. From these components, Benson developed a 6-step technique for eliciting the response for study at the Thorndike Memorial Laboratory and Beth Israel Deaconess Medical Center. By 1996, only two of the four components were found to be essential: a mental device and a passive attitude. An updated edition of his book divided the 6 steps further into 9 steps, as is taught at the Benson-Henry Institute at Massachusetts General Hospital. The goal is to activate the parasympathetic nervous system, which causes humans to relax.

== Fight-or-flight ==
Benson developed the idea of the response, which counters the fight-or-flight response described during the 1920s by Walter Bradford Cannon at the Harvard Medical School. According to Benson more than 60 percent of all visits to healthcare providers are related to stress. Stress causes the “fight or flight” hormones, epinephrine and norepinephrine, to secrete into the bloodstream. This incites or exacerbates a number of conditions. They include hypertension, headaches, insomnia, irritable bowel syndrome and chronic low back pain, as well as heart disease, stroke and cancer.

A physician with ABC News adds that the immune system works best when relaxed. He said about twenty deep breaths per day, done "with intention", can accomplish this.

== Reception ==
In a 1986 US national survey, reported in The New York Times, this best-seller was the number one self-help book that clinical psychologists recommended to their patients.
