= In High Places (Hailey novel) =

1962 novel by Arthur Hailey

- First edition
- Author: Arthur Hailey
- Language: English
- Genre: Political fiction
- Set in: Canada
- Publisher: Doubleday
- Publication date: 1962
- Publication place: Canada
- Media type: Print
- Pages: 415
- ISBN: 0385041594
- OCLC: 1035653633

In High Places is a 1962 novel written by Arthur Hailey, a writer known for his success in writing English-language bestsellers. This novel's plot follows the professional career of a Prime Minister of Canada, James McCallum Howden, who faces various challenges of governance relating to foreign policy during the Cold War and domestic issues, such as immigration reform.

== Summary ==
The novel is set during a fictional crisis of the Cold War. The characters are presented as attempting to lead Canada as the country faces the imminent threat of thermonuclear war.

James McCallum Howden is portrayed as Canada's Prime Minister, the leader of an unnamed party. The Howden government possesses a rocky, unstable majority in Canada's Parliament. Howden's political struggles are shown in counterpoint with the mingled strength and troubled feelings that he gets from his marriage. He and his wife Margaret are depicted as having a pleasant, passionless relationship, with the politician troubled by guilt over the memories of a past extramarital affair with his assistant, Milly Freedeman. Despite this misstep, Howden is portrayed as a sympathetic character.

Three main storylines are intermingled in the novel, with the characters involved crossing paths at one point or another and influencing each other's lives indirectly through third parties or by feeling the consequences of each other's action. The first storyline follows James Howden and the people from his immediate surroundings' interactions at work or personal affairs, such as the development of a romance between Howden's right-hand man Brian Richardson and Milly Freedeman, the second one describes a seemingly completely unrelated event on the other side of the country in Vancouver, BC, involving an illegal immigrant and his lawyer's attempts to gain him admission in the country, and the third deals with the imminent threat from a nuclear war and the diplomatic events set into motion between Canada and the United States as a result of their efforts to coordinate their defense against the Soviet Union and its satellite states.

During the course of the novel, it becomes increasingly clear that Howden's premiership is gravely threatened by the consequences of an amoral political pact that Howden was forced to make with erstwhile ally Harvey Warrender in order to gain the party leadership. The deteriorating relationship between Howden and Warrender forms one of the key plot movements of the novel. Another major plot element is the destabilization of the internal political situation in the country as a result of a PR campaign led by the opposition centering on the case of the illegal immigrant involved in a court case in British Columbia. While Howden successfully negotiates the treaty with the U.S. that guarantees Canada's survival at the end of the future war and the threat from his former political ally is eliminated by Richardson, Howden still faces the prospect of losing the approaching election and descending from power as a result from his actions in the immigration case. The novel ends on a cliffhanger, with Howden preparing to give a speech in the House of Parliament about the future treaty with the U.S. that could change North America's political map forever.
