= The Greening of America =

Book written by Charles Reich in 1970 on the counterculture in the United States

- Hardcover edition
- Author: Charles A. Reich
- Language: English
- Subject: Sociology
- Genre: Non-fiction
- Publisher: Random House
- Publication date: 1970
- Publication place: United States
- Media type: Print, e-book
- Pages: 399 pp. (hardcover)
- Followed by: Garcia: A Signpost to New Space

The Greening of America is a 1970 book by Charles A. Reich. It is a paean to the counterculture of the 1960s and its values. Excerpts first appeared as an essay in the September 26, 1970 issue of The New Yorker. The book was originally published by Random House.

== Overview ==
The book's argument rests on three separate types of world view:

- "Consciousness I" applies to the typical values and opinions of rural farmers and small businesspeople which dominated society in 19th century America.
- "Consciousness II" represents a viewpoint of "an organizational society", featuring meritocracy and improvement through various large institutions, the ethos of the New Deal, World War II and the 1950s Silent Generation.
- "Consciousness III" represents the worldview of the 1960s counterculture, focusing on personal freedom, egalitarianism, and recreational drugs.

The book mixed sociological analysis with panegyrics to rock music, cannabis, and blue jeans, arguing that these fashions embodied a fundamental social shift.

== Bestseller ==
The book was a best-seller in 1970 and 1971, and topped the New York Times Best Seller list on December 27, 1970, and other weeks.
