= Charles A. Reich =

American academic and writer (1928–2019)

- Born: Charles Alan Reich; May 20, 1928; New York City, New York, U.S.
- Died: June 15, 2019 (aged 91); San Francisco, California, U.S.
- Education: Oberlin College (BA); Yale University (LLB)
- Occupations: Law professor; writer
- Known for: The Greening of America (1970)

Charles Alan Reich (/raɪʃ/ RYSHE; May 20, 1928 – June 15, 2019) was an American academic and writer best known for writing the 1970 book The Greening of America, a paean to the counterculture of the 1960s. Excerpts of the book first appeared in The New Yorker, and its seismic reception there contributed to the book leading The New York Times Best Seller list. Due to the theme and implications of this book Reich was described as a "high priest of antitechnology".

== Life ==
Reich was born in New York City to a medical family. He attended City and Country School and Lincoln School in the city prior to undergraduate studies at Oberlin College, receiving his B.A. in 1949. As a law student, he was editor-in-chief of the Yale Law Journal for 1951–1952 and he clerked for U.S. Supreme Court Justice Hugo L. Black during the 1953–1954 term. During this period he also became a friend of Justice William O. Douglas, as he recounts in his autobiography. Prior to his academic career he worked for six years as a lawyer at the white-shoe firms Cravath, Swaine & Moore in New York and Arnold & Porter in Washington, D.C.

Reich was a professor at Yale Law School from 1960 to 1974. His "The New Property" influenced the Supreme Court to broaden its conceptualization of property in the landmark administrative law case Goldberg v. Kelly. Bill Clinton, Samuel Alito, and Hillary Clinton were students of Reich when he was writing The Greening of America and he is mentioned in their biographies. Reich left Yale in 1974 to move to San Francisco, although he continued as a visiting professor from 1974 to 1976. He returned to teach at Yale from 1991 to 1994 and in February 2011. The Yale Law School Association selected Reich for its Award of Merit in 2008.

Reich was gay, and came to terms with this in San Francisco during the 1970s era of rapidly advancing gay rights. He came out during this early period of the modern LGBT rights movement and in his autobiography he details his activism and the process of coming to terms with his then long-repressed sexuality. Decades later Reich was less active in LGBT affairs and explicitly stated that his need to live alone "trumped" sexual orientation as meaningful in his life.

Reich died in San Francisco on June 15, 2019.

== Publications ==
=== Articles ===
Reich wrote numerous articles. The following is a selection:

- 1962: "Bureaucracy and the forests: An occasional paper on the role of the political process in the free society" (Center for the Study of Democratic Institutions)
- 1964: "The New Property" (Yale Law Journal)
- 1965: "Individual Rights and Social Welfare: The Emerging Legal Issues" (Yale Law Journal)
- 1966: "Police Questioning of Law Abiding Citizens" (Yale Law Journal)
- 1987: "The Liberals' Mistake" (adapted from Regents' Lecture at the University of California, Santa Barbara)
- 1990: "Symposium: The Legacy of Goldberg v. Kelly: A Twenty Year Perspective: Beyond the New Property: An Ecological View of Due Process" (Brooklyn Law Review)

=== Books ===
Reich also authored and co-authored a number of books. The following is a selection:

- 1970: The Greening of America: How the Youth Revolution is Trying to Make America Livable
- 1972: Garcia: A Signpost to New Space (co-authored with Jerry Garcia and Jann Wenner, Straight Arrow Press; re-issued, Da Capo Press, 2003)
- 1976: The Sorcerer of Bolinas Reef (autobiography)
- 1995: Opposing the System

== See also ==
- List of law clerks for the first seat of the Supreme Court of the United States
