= Centennial (novel) =

Novel by James A. Michener

- First edition cover
- Author: James A. Michener
- Language: English
- Publisher: Random House
- Publication date: 1974
- Publication place: United States
- Media type: print
- Pages: 909pp.
- ISBN: 0-394-47970-X

Centennial is a novel by American author James A. Michener, published in 1974. It traces the history of the plains of north-east Colorado from prehistory until the mid-1970s. Geographic details about the fictional town of Centennial and its surroundings indicate that the region is in modern Weld County.

Centennial was number one on the New York Times bestseller list for 28 weeks during 1974 and 1975. It was made into a popular twelve-part television miniseries, also titled Centennial, that was broadcast on NBC from October 1978 through February 1979 and was filmed in several parts of Colorado. NBC Universal released a six volume DVD set in 2008.

== Development ==
Michener researched and wrote the novel in the early 1970s, basing himself in Denver and traveling in the American west and along the Oregon Trail. He also drew on his experiences in northeast Colorado during 1936-37 when he taught at the University of Northern Colorado in Greeley.

In his companion volume About Centennial, he explained that the idea for the novel came to him fully formed and reflected two organizing principles. One was ecology: he felt he needed to write about "the meaning of the west and the natural interrelationships that controlled it." The other was his experience working on a plan for a national U.S. bicentennial celebration that had been rejected by Congress. He felt that in the absence of a major national marking of the bicentennial, he needed to "use my knowledge of my nation and write about its spiritual condition as honestly as I could."

Michener emphasized that the book is a novel and is meant to be fiction. It begins with an announcement:

This is a novel. Its characters and scenes are imaginary. There was no Venneford Ranch, no prairie town of Line Camp, no Skimmerhorn cattle drive of 1868, no Centennial. None of the families depicted here were real, nor founded upon real precedents. There was no Lame Beaver, nor Skimmerhorn nor Zendt nor Grebe. On the other hand, certain background incidents and characters are real. There was a great convocation in 1851 at Fort Laramie. There was a drought in 1931–5. Jennie Jerome, the mother of Winston Churchill, did frequent the English ranches near Cheyenne. Charles Goodnight, one of the great men of the west, did haul the corpse of his partner home in a lead box. Melchior Fordney, the master gunsmith, was murdered. The South Platte River did behave as described.

Some episodes in the book are loosely based on events in eastern Colorado and southeast Wyoming, which for novelistic reasons are brought to one locale. For example, the Rattlesnake Buttes massacre in chapter 7 is based on the Sand Creek Massacre which took place in Kiowa County, Colorado, in 1864, and the character of Captain Frank Skimmerhorn on its perpetrator, Col. John Chivington. Other parts of the book are loosely based on a family from Sterling in Logan County. Michener commented that he was inspired to include a story line about Mexican workers by observing relations between Mexicans and Anglos in Greeley in the 1930s, which had led him to make a trip to Chihuahua, Mexico. Some of his depictions of impoverished farm families during the Dust Bowl years stemmed from his memories of students to whom it had been his job to allocate $35 monthly stipends through the National Youth Administration program, meeting their families, and realizing that his students were contributing some of their stipends to the family income.

Centennial is not meant to represent a single settlement. Michener's description of the town's location places it at the junction of the South Platte River and the Cache la Poudre River. This is roughly halfway between the Colorado towns of Greeley and Kersey, in central Weld County on the High Plains about 25 miles (40 km) east of the base of the Rockies. There is a city called Centennial, Colorado, but it did not exist until 2001 and its location and history are not like the town described in either the book or miniseries.

== Plot summary ==
Centennial is structured as fourteen loosely-linked chapters, some of novella length. They are connected through shared setting, the family trees linking characters, and a plot device which presents the book as the work of historian Lewis Vernor, who has been hired by the fictional US magazine (not to be confused with the real-life tabloid Us Weekly) to contribute to an upcoming issue focused on one American community: Centennial, Colorado. Each chapter except the first and last is a report sent by Vernor to his editors and closes with a "Caution to US Editors" offering the character's thoughts about the issues discussed in the chapter.

Chapter 1: The Commission In 1973 Vernor visits Centennial to decide whether to accept the commission from US magazine, meets some of the residents, and learns about the town and its region. He decides to take the job after he notices a local real estate agent, Morgan Wendell, behaving strangely at a construction site on Beaver Creek and, when he investigates, finds a single human bone in a cave at the site.

Chapter 2: The Land A geological and geographical overview that presents the history of the Rocky Mountains, great plains, and South Platte River. It highlights the creation of four fictional features that play important roles in later chapters: a chalk cliff northwest of Centennial, a mountain valley (Blue Valley) with a vein of gold, the Rattlesnake Buttes (based on the real-life Pawnee Buttes), and the cave in the limestone along Beaver Creek.

Chapter 3: The Inhabitants A paleontological history of the area, beginning with a discussion of dinosaurs and early mammals focused on a diplodocus that, following theories current in the late 1960s and early 1970s, is depicted as aquatic. Moving forward in time, it covers the evolution of horses and the arrival of the first bison from Eurasia, then describes the life cycle of beavers, focusing on one who uses the cave as her den, and a battle between an eagle and a rattlesnake at the Buttes. The last species to arrive is Homo sapiens, and Vernor imagines the first time a person saw the site of Centennial on the border between mountains and prairie.

Chapter 4: The Many Coups of Lame Beaver This chapter describes the evolution of Plains Indian cultures during the eighteenth century, as tribes acquired horses and guns, through the biography of Lame Beaver, an Arapaho warrior whose band often camps around Rattlesnake Buttes and Beaver Creek. Notably for future chapters, Lame Beaver and his band become acquainted with the fur traders Pasquinel and McKeag at the turn of the nineteenth century, and he acquires two gold bullets from a Ute warrior during a battle at Blue Valley.

Chapter 5: The Yellow Apron This chapter covers the rise and fall of the fur trade in the early nineteenth-century west through the story of partners Pasquinel, a coureur des bois, and Scotsman Alexander McKeag. The pair establish sometimes-delicate relationships with Native peoples including the Arapaho and Pawnee as they trade for and then trap beaver pelts to sell in St. Louis. Pasquinel has a wife in St. Louis but also marries Clay Basket, Lame Beaver's daughter, in hopes of learning about the source of her father's gold bullets. Their sons epitomize the difficulties facing multiracial children in this period, fully accepted by neither society. By the time McKeag and Pasquinel attend the 1827 rendezvous at Bear Lake, the trade is in decline as the beaver are hunted to near-extinction.

Chapter 6: The Wagon and the Elephant In 1844 Levi and Elly Zendt travel from Pennsylvania to St. Joseph, Missouri, and head west along the Oregon Trail. At Fort John they meet McKeag and Clay Basket, who are running a trading post after Pasquinel's death. When they reach the Continental Divide hardship and fear, which Levi describes as "seeing the elephant," leads them to turn back. The Zendts and McKeags establish a new trading post at Beaver Creek, and after Elly's death from snakebite Levi marries McKeag and Clay Basket's daughter Lucinda.

Chapter 7: The Massacre This chapter describes the dispossession of Native Americans as more migrants move west. It begins with a meeting in 1851 at Fort Laramie where representatives from the tribes and the United States government make an agreement leaving the Indians in possession of the land but allowing the Americans right of passage. The discovery of gold at Pikes Peak and the ensuing Colorado gold rush draw hordes of prospectors and other settlers into the region by the end of the 1850s, including to Blue Valley. The United States breaks the 1851 agreement and forces the Arapaho to accept a reservation at Rattlesnake Buttes, where they can neither start farming nor survive by hunting. Settlers attack Indians trying to hunt outside the reservation, Indians retaliate, and a cycle of violence and revenge develops. In 1864 a Denver-based militia led by Frank Skimmerhorn, who believes it is his destiny to exterminate the Indians, massacres the Arapaho at Rattlesnake Buttes.

Chapter 8: The Cowboys This chapter describes the development of the cattle industry. It illustrates how ranchers were able to establish control over millions of acres of range by homesteading on water sources and other strategic parcels, and tells the story of how John Skimmerhorn, son of the murderous militia captain, organized an 1868 cattle drive from Texas to Colorado that overcame the waterless Llano Estacado, Comanche raiders, and outlaws to bring longhorn cattle to the Venneford Ranch, located near the growing town of Zendt's Farm on the site of the trading post.

Chapter 9: The Hunters This chapter introduces another group of landowners, the farmers who came to the South Platte to feed the miners and towns, and their conflicts with the ranchers who seek to drive them off their farms. Among those attacked is an irrigation pioneer, Hans "Potato" Brumbaugh, who drives off the attackers with the help of Levi Zendt and John Skimmerhorn. A second plot is the disappearance of the bison, exterminated by sport hunters and professional market hunters like Amos Calendar, one of the cowboys from the Texas cattle drive. Calendar later turns to collecting buffalo bones to sell. Without the bison, the Arapaho can no longer survive at Rattlesnake Buttes and leave for a reservation further to the north. In 1876 Colorado becomes a state and the town of Zendt's Farm renames itself "Centennial."

Chapter 10: A Smell of Sheep This chapter covers the range wars between cattlemen and sheepmen in the late nineteenth century. Sheepman Messmore Garrett arrives in Centennial to establish a ranch on land that is claimed, but not owned, by Venneford Ranch. He hires Calendar and a second cattle drive veteran, Buford Coker, as shepherds. The ranchers threaten them, kill their sheep, and when that fails hire professional assassins, the Pettis Boys, to kill them. The Pettises kill Coker but fail to kill Calendar. He forms a posse with Brumbaugh and Jim Lloyd, another cattle drive veteran now working at Venneford, and kills the outlaws. The era of huge ranches on public land draws to a close with the winter of 1886-87, which kills tens of thousands of cattle on the northern plains.

Chapter 11: The Crime This chapter begins with a comment from Vernor that Western history has a dark side, with many prominent families having gotten their start through a crime of some kind. In Centennial, this is the family of Mervin and Maude Wendell, actors and con artists who arrive in 1889 and begin running badger games. When a would-be victim calls them out, they panic and kill him in the ensuing scuffle. The Wendells' son Philip helps his mother to hide the body in the cave at Beaver Creek. Sheriff Axel Dumire suspects them but can't prove their guilt; Philip is torn between his admiration for Dumire and his need to protect his parents. After Dumire is killed in a shootout with the remaining Pettis Boys, the Wendells are free to settle down and Mervin starts a prosperous real estate business. In 1973, Vernor talks to their grandson Morgan Wendell about the bone in the cave and Wendell confirms that his father told him about the crime on his deathbed.

Chapter 12: Central Beet This chapter covers the rise of the sugar beet industry and the development of the migrant labor system that supported it. Potato Brumbaugh and the other farmers are growing beets for the town's new processing plant, Central Beet, but need workers to tend their fields. Eventually they settle on Mexican and Mexican-American migrant workers, who spend summers on the farms and winters in Denver. Brumbaugh hires Tranquilino Marquez, who came to the United States to escape an oppressive forced-labor regime in a mining area of Chihuahua. In 1911 an aging Brumbaugh asks Marquez to bring his family to Centennial, but when he reaches Chihuahua he finds his hometown has been destroyed in the upheaval of the Mexican Revolution. He sends his family to Brumbaugh and becomes a fighter in the forces of Pancho Villa.

Chapter 13: Drylands This chapter has two distinct plot lines. One covers the growth of dryland farming on the plains in the early twentieth century. Immigrants from Iowa, attracted by cheap land in Colorado, homestead in a speculative town called Line Camp developed by Mervin Wendell on former Venneford land. They face drought and financial disaster in the 1920s, followed by the Great Depression and Dust Bowl years; one family dies in a murder-suicide. Line Camp hollows out as the small farmers decline, since only the larger farms and speculators like the Wendells can hold on until World War II raises world wheat prices. The second plot describes the immiseration of the Mexican farm workers and the efforts of Truinfador Marquez, son of Tranquilino, to improve conditions for his community. In a side plot, the British owners of Venneford Ranch sell out to their American managers, the Garrett family.

Chapter 14: November Elegy This chapter is back in the book's present, 1973. Vernor has decided to finish his time in Centennial by sending the US editors a profile of a person whose life epitomizes the history of the west. He chooses Paul Garrett, owner of Venneford Ranch and descendant of many of the Native people and pre-1900 immigrants whose stories he told in his earlier reports. He shadows Garrett and asks him to record his thoughts. Garrett is a prominent figure with roles in the state's bicentennial committee and as deputy to the state Commissioner of Resources and Priorities, Morgan Wendell. Yet he is troubled by pollution, unchecked development, and cultural decline in general, and by the decline of Centennial, where Central Beet and the feedlot are closing, in particular. He decides to cross his Hereford cattle with larger, more economical Simmentals, but hates doing it. His relationship with his girlfriend Flor Marquez is a bright spot, and they are able to overcome their concerns about the unusualness of a Chicano-Anglo union and marry. Still, on the day the Simmentals arrive he gets drunk at the Railway Arms hotel (also slated for closure). Vernor and cowboy musician Cisco Calendar take him to his father-in-law's Mexican restaurant to sober up. Cisco sings his trademark song, "The Buffalo Skinners," and reminds Garret that Centennial might be the best spot in America, maybe even the world. Garrett agrees that "it damn well could be."

== Characters ==
Most of the primary characters of the novel are represented in the ancestry of Paul Garrett as follows:

Paul Garrett's ancestors

16. John Garrett (1810–1881)
8. Messmore Garrett (1849–1904)
17. Prusence Messmore (1814–1887)
4. Beeley Garrett (1870–1938)
18. Patrick Beeley (1806–1887)
9. Jane Beeley (1855–1914)
19. Helen Garrett (1810–1880)
2. Henry Garrett (1895–1958)
20. Levi Zendt (1820–1887)
10. Martin Zendt (1849–1911)
21. Lucinda McKeag (1827–1890)
5. Pale Star Zendt (1874–1939)
22. Red Wolf (1831–1897)
11. Prudence Wolf (1866–1936)
23. Pale Star (1842–1912)
1. Paul Garrett (1927–)
24. Maxwell Mercy (1811–1891)
12. Pasquinel Mercy (1850–1876)
25. Lisette Pasquinel (1817–1883)
6. Paul Mercy (1877–1933)
26. John Skimmerhorn (1838–1906)
13. Laura Skimmerhorn (1858–1903)
27. Martha Deal (1841–1908)
3. Ruth Mercy (1906–1973)
28. Tom Lloyd (1834–1864)
14. James Lloyd (1854–1924)
29. Emma Staller (1840–1891)
7. Nancy Lloyd (1890–1933)
30. Henry Buckland (1822–1888)
15. Charlotte Buckland (1852–1935)
31. Evelyn Buckland (1827–1866)
