= The Moneychangers =

1975 book by Arthur Hailey

- First edition
- Author: Arthur Hailey
- Language: English
- Publisher: Doubleday
- Publication date: February 1975
- Publication place: United States
- Pages: 472
- ISBN: 0-385-00896-1
- OCLC: 1119465

The Moneychangers is a 1975 novel written by Arthur Hailey. The plot revolves around the politics inside a major bank.

== Plot summary ==
As the novel begins, the position of CEO of one of America's largest banks, First Mercantile American, is about to become vacant due to the terminal illness of Ben Roselli, the incumbent chief, whose grandfather founded the bank.

Two high-ranking executives groomed for the succession begin their personal combat for the position. One, Alex Vandervoort, is honest, hard-charging, and focused on growing FMA through retail banking and embracing emerging technology; the other, Roscoe Heyward, is suave, hypocritical, and skilled in boardroom politics, and favors catering more to business than to consumers. Heyward lives in a "rambling, three-story house in the suburb of Shaker Heights," Cleveland, Ohio.

Many characters and plot lines interweave. Senior bank teller Miles Eastin is discovered to be defrauding the bank whilst casting guilt on another teller, a young single mother named Juanita Nunez. He is dismissed, arrested, and convicted. While in prison, he is gang-raped by a gang of fellow inmates. In prison, his knowledge of counterfeiting brings him to the attention of a gang of credit card forgers, who offer him a job on his release. Owing money to loan sharks, and desperate not to have to go to work for a criminal organization, he tries going back to his former employer to ask for some kind of job. Nolan Wainwright, the bank's Head of Security, obviously won't hire him to work directly for the bank, but with the approval of higher management, is allowed to pay Eastin to go undercover as an affiliate of the forgers and secretly report back details of their operation to Juanita Nunez, who had forgiven him after he came to see her and apologize for what he did. She agrees to be the "cut-out" whom Eastin will contact, and she will report back what he tells her to Wainwright. Eastin is discovered to be a planted spy by the criminal organization and tortured, only to be rescued in the nick of time as a result of Juanita being captured by the forgers and forced to identify Eastin. She is released, but uses her photographic memory to count the amount of time she spent blindfolded in the car and the movements it made, and as a result is able to lead police to the safe house where Eastin was being held and tortured. At the end, Eastin, Juanita and her daughter, Estella, move out of the state where both get new jobs. Also featured is Edwina D'Orsey, the head of FMA's flagship downtown branch, through whom a reader gains much insight into day-to-day branch banking, and her husband, Lewis, who writes a financial newsletter.

As readers increasingly appreciate Vandervoort, the protagonist, they learn of his troubled personal life. His advancement in banking circles has come as his marriage is failing; his wife Celia is confined to an inpatient psychiatric facility. Vandervoort is shown as having developed a relationship with Margot Bracken, who is depicted as a radical attorney and political activist many years his junior; her attitudes sometime conflicts with Vandervoort's role at FMA. She is also related to Edwina D'Orsey, as she is her first cousin. Meanwhile, Vandervoort's antagonist, Heyward, is depicted as a devout Episcopalian who strives to maintain an air of personal integrity and morality, only to slowly sacrifice them both in his pursuit of the presidency of FMA.

As these men pursue their battle for the soon-to-be-vacant position of CEO, various issues involving the banking industry, such as credit card fraud, embezzlement, inflation, subprime lending, and insider trading are discussed. First Mercantile American is eventually revealed to have a doppelganger in the form of an organized crime family.

The fight for control of the bank continues under the darkening clouds of an approaching economic recession. Heyward is manipulated into making a large, illegal and toxic loan to Supranational Corporation (SuNatCo), a multinational conglomerate (loosely based on International Telephone and Telegraph, with certain elements of Penn Central) run by the powerful, unscrupulous CEO, G. G. Quartermain. It turns out that SuNatCo is on the verge of bankruptcy, using the bank's loan in a vain attempt to keep afloat. The ensuing scandal causes a bank run and panic among depositors, shareholders, and employees. An investigative reporter discovers that Heyward was not only the key facilitator of the toxic loan, but he had accepted bribes (securities and in-kind) to do so. Facing arrest and possible prison, he commits suicide. By the vote of the board of directors, Vandervoort assumes the position of CEO of the half-ruined bank.

== Real-life background ==
One of the banking innovations that Hailey mentioned in The Moneychangers is Docutel, an automated teller machine, based on real technology that was issued a patent in 1974 in the United States.

In the novel, Jill Peacock, a journalist, interviewed First Mercantile American Bank executive VP, Alexander Vandervoort, in a suburban shopping plaza where the bank had installed the first two stainless-steel Docutel automatic tellers. Vandervoort, whose clothes looked like they were from the "fashion section of Esquire" and who had the "mannerisms a la Johnny Carson", was not at all like the classical solemn, cautious banker in a double-breasted, dark blue suit. Peacock compared him to the new ATMs which embodied modern banking.

The history of the real Docutel was traced in a New York Times magazine article. The breakthrough came when Don Wetzel, Vice President of Product Planning at Docutel, was waiting in a long line for a teller at a bank in Dallas, Texas in 1968. Wetzel had seen cash dispensing machines in Europe and was inspired to adapt Docutel technology, which was originally used in airport baggage handling, to create Docuteller, an American version. By 1969 work began on the prototype and the first working Docutel ABM was installed at Chemical Bank in New York.

The bank is very loosely based on the Bank of America, although it is located in a Midwestern American city loosely drawing mostly from Cincinnati, Ohio. During the first 5 chapters of the book, it only describes the bank's location as a state in "the Midwest" and the state itself is never identified.

== Miniseries ==
The novel was adapted for television as a 6 1/2-hour NBC miniseries titled Arthur Hailey's the Moneychangers of which its four parts aired on 4 December 1976, and each of the subsequent three Sunday evenings through 19 December as part of the network's "Big Event" format. Ross Hunter and Jacque Mapes were the producers and Boris Sagal directed.

Starring

- Kirk Douglas as Alex Vandervoort
- Christopher Plummer as Roscoe Heyward
- Timothy Bottoms as Miles Eastin
- Susan Flannery as Margot Bracken
- Anne Baxter as Edwina Dorsey
- Percy Rodrigues as Nolan Wainwright

Guest starring

- Ralph Bellamy as Jerome Patterton
- Joan Collins as Avril Devereaux
- Robert Loggia as Tony Bear
- Marisa Pavan as Celia Vandervoort
- Jean Peters as Beatrice Heyward
- Hayden Rorke as Lewis Dorsey
- James Shigeta as Wizard Wong
- Amy Tivell as Juanita Nunez
- and Patrick O'Neal as Harold Austin

Special appearance by

- Lorne Greene as George Quartermain
- Helen Hayes as Dr. McCartney

Co-starring

- Roger Bowen as Fergus Gatwick
- Leonardo Cimino as Ben Roselli
- Douglas V. Fowley as Danny Kerrigan
- Basil Hoffman as Stanley Inchbeck
- Lincoln Kilpatrick as Deacon Euphrates
- Harry Lewis as George Sperrie
- Woodrow Parfrey as Mr. Tottenhoe
- Michael Shannon as Lew Endicott
- Stan Shaw as John Dinkerwell
- Joseph R. Sicari as Julius LaRocca
- Chick Vennera as Humphy Lopez

John J. O'Connor of The New York Times raised concerns about the violence portrayed in the miniseries. He described the scene that concluded Part 1 involving the rape of embezzler Miles Eastin by fellow inmates as "one of the most explicity [sic] sexual-assault scenes devised without benefit of outright hardcore pornography."

Christopher Plummer received a Primetime Emmy Award for Outstanding Lead Actor in a Limited Series in 1977. Three additional Primetime Emmy Award nominations were for Limited or Anthology Series, Lead Actress in a Limited Series (Susan Flannery) and Outstanding Cinematography in Entertainment Programming for a Series (Joseph Biroc).
