= Mildred Newman =

American psychologist (1919/20–2001)

- Born: Mildred Rubenstein; 1919 or 1920
- Died: November 6, 2001 (aged 81)
- Education: Hunter College
- Occupations: Psychologist and author
- Notable work: How to Be Your Own Best Friend
- Spouse(s): Phillip Newman; Bernard Berkowitz (M: 1962)

Mildred Newman (née Rubenstein; 1919/20 – November 6, 2001) was an American psychologist and author known for her self-help books.

== Early life ==
Newman's mother was from Russia, and Newman grew up in Manhattan. Newman gained an undergraduate degree (1940) and a master's degree (1943) from Hunter College. Prior to working as a psychologist, Newman spent time studying modern dance and was an artists' model. She trained as a psychoanalyst at the National Psychological Association for Psychoanalysis, which was founded by Theodor Reik.

== Career ==
Newman started her psychoanalyst practice in New York City in the mid-1950s. She realized that her patients needed a place to have positive feedback, and in 1971 she and her husband Bernard Berkowitz started a book that became How to Be Your Own Best Friend. In 2018, an article in the New York Post attributed the self-help industry that followed back to this 1971 book.

Newman worked with many prominent clients, starting with Paula Prentiss,Anthony Perkins, George Segal, Neil Simon, Nora Ephron, and others. Newman and her husband treated so many celebrities that they were known as "therapists of the stars". She and her husband also participated in social events with her clients.

Newman was a proponent of conversion therapy, famously using electroshock with Perkins to treat his homosexuality. Such views and treatments were not unusual for mainstream medical professionals of the era. Perkins's friend and collaborator Stephen Sondheim described Newman to author Mark Harris as "completely unethical and a danger to humanity".

== Personal life ==
Her first husband was Philip Newman, though they later divorced. She met her second husband, Bernard Berkowitz as a teenager waiting in line for a concert, and they married in 1962. By 1978, they were sharing recipes in a newspaper article that was one of a series on celebrity recipes. Newman died of a pulmonary embolism on November 6, 2001, aged 81.

== Selected publications ==
- Newman, Mildred; Stern, E. Mark (1964). "The Age Game". Psychoanalytic Review. 51B (2): 63–74.
- Newman, Mildred; Berkowitz, Bernard (1974). How to be your own best friend; a conversation with two psychoanalysts. Jean Owen ([1st U.S. ed.] ed.). New York: Ballantine Books. ISBN 0-345-24333-1. OCLC 1338573.
- Newman, Mildred (2016). How to be awake and alive. Bernard Berkowitz. New York, NY: Random House Publishing Group. ISBN 978-0-399-59037-5. OCLC 953848210.
- Newman, Mildred (1977). How to take charge of your life. Bernard Berkowitz (1st ed.). New York: Harcourt Brace Jovanovich. ISBN 0-15-142192-7. OCLC 2907334.
