= The Matarese Circle =

1979 novel by Robert Ludlum

- The Matarese Circle first edition cover.
- Author: Robert Ludlum
- Language: English
- Series: The Matarese Dynasty
- Genre: Spy novel
- Publisher: Richard Marek
- Publication date: 1979
- Publication place: United States
- Media type: Print (Hardback & Paperback)
- Pages: 601 pp (first edition)
- ISBN: 0-399-90043-8
- OCLC: 4685151
- Dewey Decimal: 813/.5/4
- LC Class: PZ4.L9455 Mas PS3562.U26
- Followed by: The Matarese Countdown

The Matarese Circle (1979) is a novel by Robert Ludlum. The story is followed by a 1997 sequel, The Matarese Countdown.

== Story ==
On Christmas Eve in 1978, General Anthony Blackburn, Chairman of the Joint Chiefs of Staff, is killed in a New York brothel. Some time later, Soviet nuclear physicist Dmitri Yuri Yurievich is killed on a hunting trip in the Russian countryside. Soviet KGB officer Vasili Taleniekov and American Consular Operations operative Brandon Scofield, respectively, are considered the most likely assassins. Taleniekov and Scofield are personal as well as professional enemies, Taleniekov having engineered the death of Scofield's wife and Scofield having personally killed Taleniekov's brother. War is only averted through swift communication between the American President and the Soviet Premier.

In Amsterdam, Scofield, tired of the covert intelligence world, deliberately releases a suspected mole and assaults a fellow intelligence officer when the latter kills the suspect. Meanwhile, Taleniekov, in Moscow, is summoned by his former teacher, retired Istrebiteli Aleksie Krupskaya, who tells him of an international cabal of assassins known as the Matarese who were headquartered in Corsica. Krupskaya urges Taleniekov to find Scofield and stop the Matarese. Taleniekov visits four retired Politburo leaders and is shortly after branded a traitor and marked for execution. He flees Russia through a CIA escape route in Sevastapol and travels to the United States, sending an old subordinate to contact Scofield.

Scofield is summoned to Washington, D.C., and forced into retirement. He sees Taleniekov's man in the street, traps and kills him, and delivers the body to the Soviet embassy. Scofield is placed "beyond salvage" by the State Department, and three men are summoned from Prague, Amsterdam, and Marseilles to kill him. He and Taleniekov face off in a hotel in downtown Washington in a three-day-long exchange, eventually making contact, neutralizing the assassins, and escaping together. They contact Scofield's mentor Robert Winthrop, who inquires about the Matarese. The three meet at Rock Creek Park, but are attacked. None of the three are harmed, but Winthrop disappears. Acting on Krupskaya's advice, Scofield and Taleniekov travel separately to Corsica.

Taleniekov arrives first and makes inquiries in Porto Vecchio about the "padrone" of the Matarese, Guillaume de Matarese, but is hunted by the natives. He is saved by Scofield, and the two encounter a woman named Antonia, who takes them to her grandmother, known in the hills as the "whore of Villa Matarese". She tells them story of Guillaume de Matarese, a wealthy landowner and businessman who is ruined by corrupt governments in England and France to stop his interference in international business interests. In April 1911, he summoned five men who had been similarly ruined to the villa for a banquet and proposed the idea of offering assassination services, ultimately promising that those present would "inherit the earth." The names of the guests were Joshua Appleton II (USA), Sir John Waverly (England), Prince Andrei Voroshin (Russia), Count Alberto Scozzi (Italy), and Manuel Ortiz Ortega (Spain). Ortega was killed by Matarese at the banquet, and the other four conspirators leave after everyone else present, including Matarese himself, are killed by servants led by a shepherd boy from the hills. The old woman urges the two agents to find this "shepherd boy."

After escaping from the hills, Scofield and Taleniekov conclude that the Matarese are financing terrorist groups all over the world, including Baader-Meinhof, the PLO, and the Red Brigades, with the goal of paralyzing governments. Scofield and Antonia leave for Rome to track down the Scozzi family. Antonia is assaulted by the Red Brigades, of whom she was formerly a member. Scofield and Antonia fall in love. They learn about Scozzi, who married into the wealthy industrialist Paravacini family. Scofield and Antonia attend a party at Scozzi's villa, where Scofield approaches him about hiring the Matarese. Scozzi reports the conversation to Paravacini and is killed.

Meanwhile, Taleniekov travels to Leningrad in search of the Voroshins. He arrives over Finnish border and is met by a KGB traitor. He goes to see his former lover Lodzia, who is being held hostage by a Matarese soldier. They disable and kill him, and discover a blue tattoo on the left side of his chest. Meeting with his former university professor Mikovsky, Taleniekov searches the revolutionary archives. He finds the account of Voroshin's death, but realizes it is false. Lodzia and Mikovsky are both killed by other Matarese soldiers. After exposing the traitor, Taleniekov follows a lead to Essen in Germany. There, with the help of lawyer Heinrich Kassel, he finds that Voroshin secretly left Russia and became Ansel Verachten, founder of an arms competitor of Krupp. He visits Ansel's son Walter, who feels guilt over his family's history. Walter's daughter Odile is revealed as the true Matarese inheritor. She invites Taleniekov to join the Matarese, but is killed.

After escaping from Rome and Essen, Scofield, Taleniekov, and Antonia travel to London. In the wake of the Verachten murders, connections between that company and a Boston-based conglomerate called Trans-Communications are brought to light. Scofield contacts Roger Symonds, an MI6 colleague, and asks him to set up a meeting with David Waverly, the grandson of John and England's current Foreign Secretary. He and Taleniekov make a plan to capture Waverly, but Waverly and his entire family are killed. Scofield meets again with Symonds, but the latter is later killed. During this meeting Taleniekov and Antonia are kidnapped by Matarese and taken to Boston.

Scofield follows the Matarese to Boston. He becomes convinced that Joshua Appleton IV, a prominent U.S. Senator who is the overwhelming favorite to win the presidency, is the true Matarese inheritor. Scofield meets with a Harvard business professor and learns of many more connections between Trans-Communications and other conglomerates. He also learns the story of Nicholas Guiderone, the founder of Trans-Comm, and identifies him as the shepherd boy. After a visit to Appleton's mother, Scofield visits Massachusetts General Hospital, where a graduate student named Amos Lafollete helps him obtain Appleton's dental X-rays. Comparing these with X-rays obtained from when Appleton was in prep school at Andover Academy, Scofield determines that Appleton is in fact Julian Guiderone, the son of the shepherd boy.

Scofield is summoned to Appleton Hall, the Matarese headquarters. He meets with Antonia and Taleniekov, who has been tortured and cannot speak or walk, but slips Scofield a stolen gun. Robert Winthrop is also there, having been taken prisoner by his chauffeur Stanley, who is secretly a Matarese soldier. Nicholas Guiderone is revealed to be a child prodigy from Corsica who was discovered by Guillaume who wants to build a world based on the economic marketplace. He shows Scofield the Matarese council, which includes the Secretary of State, the directors of the CIA and the National Security Council, and the new Chairman of the Joint Chiefs of Staff. Scofield and Winthrop fight back, killing Stanley, Guiderone, and the rest of the Matarese council, while the Boston police converge on the estate due to a device of Scofield's. Taleniekov refuses to run and sets the house on fire, while Scofield escapes with Antonia. Nations around the world arrest members of the Matarese and unanimously agree to cover up the conspiracy. Scofield and Antonia are given a boat and retire to the Caribbean.

=== Real life references ===
In an introduction to the novel, Ludlum writes that he based the conspiracy on the Trilateral Commission.

The "Shepherd Boy" character is based on Juan March Ordinas.

The title appears to have been inspired by a popular, now-gone steak restaurant and jazz spot named Rocco Matarese's Circle in Newington, Connecticut, about 10 miles from Wesleyan University, Ludlum's alma mater. The restaurant was in business when the novel was written and for many years before.

== Characters ==
- Brandon Scofield – an intelligence officer who is Taleniekov's enemy but who ends up helping him in their efforts to find the truth
- Vasili Taleniekov – the Soviet KGB agent who stumbles upon the web of political intrigue and public deceit that revolves around an elite group known only as the 'Matarese.'

== Film adaptation ==
MGM and Relativity Media picked up the rights to Ludlum's novel for $3 million in 2008, writers Michael Brandt and Derek Haas were signed to write the script, Denzel Washington was attached to star as Scofield, Tom Cruise set to star as Taleniekov, and David Cronenberg directing. The film adaptation, originally scheduled to be released in 2013, was derailed when MGM filed for Chapter 11 bankruptcy on November 3, 2010, and Cronenberg stated that he did not think the project would be resurrected.
