= Wheels (novel) =

1971 novel by Arthur Hailey

First edition (publ. Doubleday)

Wheels (1971) is a novel by Arthur Hailey, concerning the automobile industry and the day-to-day pressures involved in its operation.

== Novel ==
The book's plot lines follow many of the topical issues of the 1970s, including race relations, corporate politics, and business ethics. The auto company of the novel, National Motors Corporation, is the little-disguised American Motors Corporation (AMC) that is the smallest domestic automaker. Adam Trenton is the ambitious executive in charge of project development with the goal of moving the company into making "cutting-edge" cars of the future. The characters are company insiders with "passions" of those "caught up in the world's fiercest power game."

== Television miniseries ==
The novel was made into a TV miniseries in 1978 directed by Jerry London and starring Rock Hudson (as Adam Trenton), Lee Remick (as Erica Trenton), Blair Brown (as Barbara Lipton), Ralph Bellamy (as Lowell Baxter), Anthony Franciosa (as Smokey Stevenson), John Beck (as Peter Flodenhale), Scott Brady (as Matt Zaleski), Tim O'Connor (as Hub Hewitson), Gerald S. O'Loughlin (as Rusty Horton), Jessica Walter (as Ursula), Lisa Eilbacher (as Jody Horton), James Carroll Jordan (as Kirk Trenton), Howard McGillin (as Greg Trenton), Marj Dusay (as Caroline Horton), Fred Williamson (as Leonard Wingate), and Harold Sylvester (as Rollie Knight).

The car presented in Hailey's novel, the Orion, was called the "Hawk" in the miniseries. The 1978 mini-series used a 1968 AMC Javelin as the basis for the fictional car. The rear end of the Javelin was shortened and filled with foam to a new design while the doors were changed to gull-wing types.
