= Arthur Hailey =

British Canadian writer (1920–2004)

- Born: Arthur Frederick Hailey; 5 April 1920; Luton, Bedfordshire, England
- Died: 24 November 2004 (aged 84); Lyford Cay, New Providence, The Bahamas
- Citizenship: United Kingdom; Canada
- Occupation: Novelist
- Spouses: Joan Fishwick (1944–1950; div.); Sheila Dunlop (m.1951)
- Children: 6
- Writing career
- Notable works: Hotel (1965); Airport (1968); Wheels (1971)

Arthur Frederick Hailey, AE (5 April 1920 – 24 November 2004) was a British-Canadian novelist whose plot-driven storylines were set against the backdrops of various industries. His books, which include such best sellers as Hotel (1965), Airport (1968), Wheels (1971), The Moneychangers (1975), and Overload (1979), have sold 170 million copies in 38 languages.

== Early life ==
Arthur Frederick Hailey was born on 5 April 1920, in Luton, Bedfordshire, England, the only child of George Wellington Hailey, a factory worker, and Elsie Wright Hailey. An avid reader, Hailey began to write poems, plays and stories at a young age. He once said, "My mother left me off chores so I could write." Elsie encouraged her son to learn typing and shorthand so that he might become a clerk instead of a factory worker.

At fourteen, Hailey failed to win a scholarship which would have enabled him to continue his schooling. From 1934 to 1939 he was an office boy and clerk in London. He joined the Royal Air Force in 1939, and served as a pilot during World War II, eventually rising to the rank of flight lieutenant. In 1947, unhappy with the post-war Labour government, he emigrated to Canada, becoming a dual citizen. Settling in Toronto, he held a variety of jobs in such fields as real estate, sales, and advertising. He was editor of a trade magazine called Bus and Truck Transport. During these years, he continued to write. Initially, the Haileys lived at 2747 St Clair Ave E. in East York, before moving in 1955 to 100 Sylvan Avenue in Scarborough. The Haileys moved again in 1962 to 11 Fallingbrook Woods in Scarborough. Additionally, the Haileys owned a cottage on Kennisis Lake.

== Career ==
Hailey's professional writing career began in 1955 with a script called Flight into Danger, which was purchased by the Canadian Broadcasting Corporation and telecast on 3 April 1956. This story of a plane flight in jeopardy after its crew is incapacitated was "the smash hit of the season," won enormous acclaim, and was broadcast internationally. It was adapted as a novel by "John Castle" (a pseudonym for Ronald Payne and John Garrod), with Hailey credited as co-author; it was published by Britain's Souvenir Press in 1958 under its original title, but renamed Runway Zero-Eight (Doubleday) for its 1959 American publication. The story was filmed in 1957 as Zero Hour! (Paramount), and for television in 1971 as Terror in the Sky.

With the success of Flight into Danger, Hailey was in demand as a television writer, and wrote for such shows as Studio One, Kraft Television Theatre, Playhouse 90, and Suspense. In 1959, he adapted his teleplay No Deadly Medicine (for which he received an Emmy nomination) into his first novel The Final Diagnosis. Published by Doubleday, it is the story of the chief pathologist at a Burlington, Pennsylvania, hospital. The book received good reviews, and was a selection of the Literary Guild of America. Hailey's second novel, In High Places (Doubleday) was published in 1962. Dealing with international politics the book was again selected by the Literary Guild, and was a best seller in Canada.

Hailey's commercial breakthrough came in 1965 with publication of Hotel (Doubleday), which followed five days in the lives of employees and residents of New Orleans' luxurious St. Gregory Hotel. The book spent 48 weeks on the New York Times Best Seller list, peaking at No. 3, and became the eighth highest-selling novel of the year. It established the template for Hailey's future works: ordinary people involved in extraordinary situations in a business or industry which is described in meticulous detail.

Following the success of Hotel, Hailey moved to California. In 1968 he achieved international fame with his fourth novel, Airport (Doubleday), the story of one eventful night at a midwestern international airport. The novel was No. 1 in the New York Times for 30 weeks, and became the top-selling novel of the year. The film adaptation, released in 1970, was the second-highest-grossing film of the year (second only to Love Story) and received ten Academy Award nominations, including Best Picture. The success of the film, together with that of 1972's The Poseidon Adventure, led to the proliferation of "disaster films" during the 1970s, which included three additional films in what became the Airport franchise.

After the financial success of Airport, on the advice of his tax attorney, Hailey moved as a tax exile to the Bahamas settling in Lyford Cay on New Providence Island. He had intended to stay for just two years, but liked it so much that he remained there for the rest of his life. In 1971, he published Wheels (Doubleday), set in the automobile industry; like Airport, it was a no. 1 New York Times best seller, and the highest-selling novel of its year. Hailey followed it with two additional no. 1 sellers: The Moneychangers (Doubleday, 1975), about the banking industry; and Overload (Doubleday, 1979), about an electric utility company.

In 1979, following publication of Overload, Hailey announced his retirement. After undergoing quadruple heart bypass surgery, however, he felt rejuvenated, and returned to work. His novel Strong Medicine (Doubleday), about the pharmaceutical industry, was published in 1984 and was another major best seller; it became the thirteenth highest-selling novel of the year. His commercial success had declined somewhat by 1990 with publication of The Evening News (Doubleday), and with his final novel, Detective (Crown), which appeared in 1997. Hailey continued to write, but—except for the slim The Lyford Legacy: A Brief History of Lyford Cay from 1788 (Lyford Cay Foundation, 2000),—he now wrote only as a hobby.

Arthur Hailey's papers are housed at the Thomas Fisher Rare Book Library, University of Toronto, and at the Harry C. Moore Library of the College of The Bahamas.

== Writing method and critical reception ==
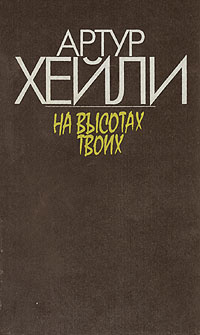
The cover of the Soviet edition of Hailey's In High Places

Hailey would usually spend three years on each book. First, he would dedicate a year to research, then six months reviewing his notes, and finally 18 months writing. His research was painstaking: he read 27 books about the hotel industry for Hotel, he spent months at a Detroit car plant for Wheels, and he spent time—at the age of 67—with rebel guerillas in the jungles of Peru for The Evening News. Hailey had no discernible literary pretensions; he said, "I'm a storyteller and anything else is incidental."

Hailey was not a critical favourite. In the New York Times, Martin Levin called him "a plodding sort of writer." Martha Gellhorn, reviewing The Evening News for The Daily Telegraph wrote, "This is not a book you cannot put down; it is a book you can hardly hold up. It will sell in millions and be translated into 34 languages. Possibly it is more readable in Icelandic or Urdu." And Time magazine, reviewing Wheels together with Harold Robbins's The Betsy, said, "Yes, junk fans, it is a mano a mano for novelists who are all thumbs. Two of the greatest schlockmeisters in the history of solid waste have just published novels about the auto industry."

But Hailey's ability to tell a story was recognised by some critics. In the New York Times, John Reed conceded, in a review of Wheels, that "Mr. Hailey is nothing if not a competent craftsman." Christopher Lehmann-Haupt, in his New York Times review of The Moneychangers wrote, "What I had in mind was diversion, and, to tell the shameful truth, I found it." Reviewing Detective, Publishers Weekly wrote, "Old pro Hailey... remains adept at hooking readers with his propulsive brand of storytelling."

== Personal life ==
Hailey was married twice. In 1944 he married Joan Fishwick (1918–2004), with whom he had three children before divorcing in 1950. In 1951 he married Sheila Dunlop (1927–2017), with whom he also had three children. In 1978 Sheila Hailey published I Married a Best Seller: My Life with Arthur Hailey (Doubleday), which was not always complimentary, but the couple remained together for 53 years.

Arthur Hailey died at age 84 in his sleep on 24 November 2004, at his home in Lyford Cay in the Bahamas, of what doctors believed to be a stroke.

== Novels ==
- Flight Into Danger (1958), with John Castle
- The Final Diagnosis (1959)
- In High Places (1962)
- Hotel (1965)
- Airport (1968)
- Wheels (1971)
- The Moneychangers (1975)
- Overload (1979)
- Strong Medicine (1984)
- The Evening News (1990)
- Detective (1997)

== Selected screen adaptations ==
- Zero Hour! (Paramount Pictures, 1957) Based on Flight into Danger
  - Directed by Hall Bartlett; written by Hailey, Bartlett, John Champion
    Starring Dana Andrews, Linda Darnell, Sterling Hayden
- The Young Doctors (United Artists, 1961) Based on The Final Diagnosis
  - Directed by Phil Karlson; written by Joseph Hayes
    Starring Fredric March, Ben Gazzara, Dick Clark
- Hotel (Warner Bros., 1967)
  - Directed by Richard Quine; written by Wendell Mayes
    Starring Rod Taylor, Catherine Spaak, Karl Malden
- Airport (Universal Studios, 1970)
  - Directed and written by George Seaton
    Starring Burt Lancaster, Dean Martin, Jean Seberg
    Nominated for ten Academy Awards, including best picture; won Best Actress in a Supporting Role (Helen Hayes)
- Arthur Hailey's The Moneychangers (NBC TV Miniseries, 1976)
  - Directed by Boris Sagal; written by Dean Riesner, Stanford Whitmore
    Starring Kirk Douglas, Christopher Plummer, Timothy Bottoms, and Joan Collins
    Nominated for five Emmys, including Outstanding Miniseries or Movie; won Outstanding Lead Actor in a Comedy or Drama Special (Christopher Plummer)
- Wheels (NBC TV Miniseries, 1978)
  - Directed by Jerry London; written by Robert Hamilton, Millard Lampell, Nancy Lynn Schwartz, Hank Searls
    Starring Rock Hudson, Lee Remick, Blair Brown
    Nominated for two Emmys, including Outstanding Lead Actress in a Drama or Comedy Special (Lee Remick)
- Arthur Hailey's Hotel (ABC TV Series, 1983–1988)
  - Starring James Brolin, Connie Sellecca, Anne Baxter
- Strong Medicine (Syndicated TV Miniseries, 1987)
  - Directed by Guy Green; written by Rita Lakin
    Starring Pamela Sue Martin, Patrick Duffy, Dick Van Dyke
- Detective (Hallmark TV Miniseries, 2005)
  - Directed by David S. Cass Sr.; written by Philip Rosenberg
    Starring Tom Berenger, Annabeth Gish, Rick Gomez
