= Spy fiction =

Fiction genre involving espionage

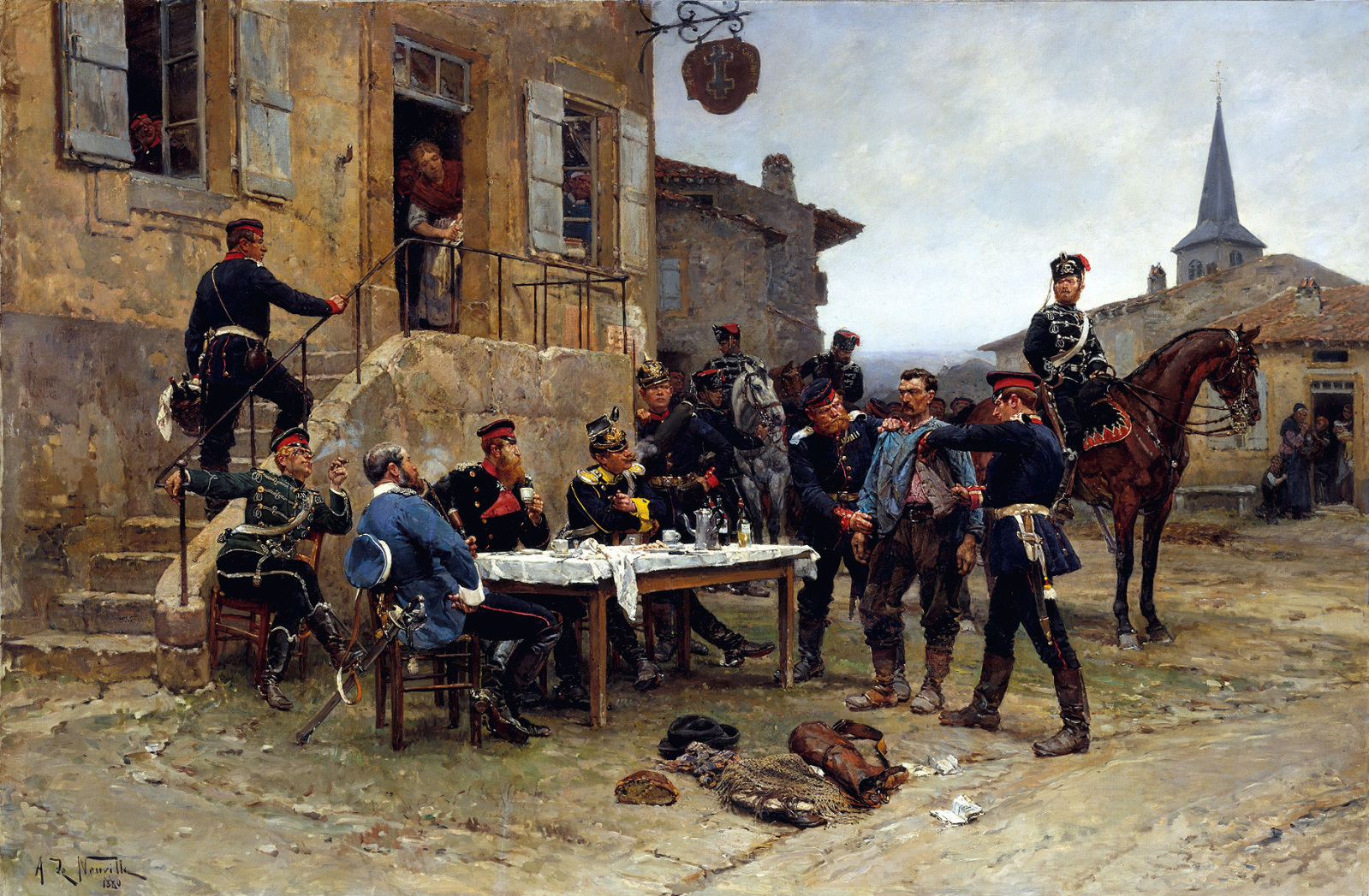
Painting of French spy captured during the Franco-Prussian War by Alphonse de Neuville, 1880

Spy fiction is a genre of literature involving espionage as an important context or plot device. It emerged in the early twentieth century, inspired by rivalries and intrigues between the major powers, and the establishment of modern intelligence agencies. It was given new impetus by the development of communism and fascism in the lead-up to World War II, continued to develop during the Cold War, and received a fresh impetus from the emergence of rogue states, international criminal organizations, global terrorist networks, maritime piracy and technological sabotage and espionage as potent threats to Western societies. As a genre, spy fiction is thematically related to the novel of adventure (The Prisoner of Zenda, 1894, The Scarlet Pimpernel, 1905), the thriller (such as the works of Edgar Wallace) and the politico-military thriller (The Schirmer Inheritance, 1953, The Quiet American, 1955).

== History ==
Commentator William Bendler noted that "Chapter 2 of the Hebrew Bible's Book of Joshua might count as the first Spy Story in world literature. (...) Three thousand years before James Bond seduced Pussy Galore and turned her into his ally against Goldfinger, the spies sent by General Joshua into the city of Jericho did much the same with Rahab the Harlot."

=== Nineteenth century ===
Spy fiction as a genre started to emerge during the 19th Century. Early examples of the espionage novel are The Spy (1821) and The Bravo (1831), by American novelist James Fenimore Cooper. The Bravo attacks European anti-republicanism, by depicting Venice as a city-state where a ruthless oligarchy wears the mask of the "serene republic".

In nineteenth-century France, the Dreyfus Affair (1894–99) contributed much to public interest in espionage. For some twelve years (ca. 1894–1906), the Affair, which involved elements of international espionage, treason, and antisemitism, dominated French politics. The details were reported by the world press: an Imperial German penetration agent betraying to Germany the secrets of the General Staff of the French Army; the French counter-intelligence riposte of sending a charwoman to rifle the trash in the German Embassy in Paris, were news that inspired successful spy fiction.

At least two Sherlock Holmes stories have clear espionage themes. In The Adventure of the Naval Treaty, Holmes recovers the text of a secret Naval Treaty between Britain and Italy, stolen by a daring spy. In His Last Bow, Holmes himself acts as a double agent, providing Germany with a lot of false information on the eve of WWI.

=== Twentieth century ===
The major themes of a spy in the lead-up to the First World War were the continuing rivalry between the European colonial powers for dominance in Asia, the growing threat of conflict in Europe, the domestic threat of revolutionaries and anarchists, and historical romance.

Kim (1901) by Rudyard Kipling concerns the Anglo–Russian "Great Game", which consisted of a geopolitical rivalry and strategic warfare for supremacy in Central Asia, usually in Afghanistan. The Secret Agent (1907) by Joseph Conrad examines the psychology and ideology motivating the socially marginal men and women of a revolutionary cell. A diplomat from an unnamed (but clearly Russian) embassy forces a double-agent, Verloc, to organise a failed attempt to bomb the Greenwich Observatory in the hope that the revolutionaries will be blamed. Conrad's next novel, Under Western Eyes (1911), follows a reluctant spy sent by the Russian Empire to infiltrate a group of revolutionaries based in Geneva. G. K. Chesterton's The Man Who Was Thursday (1908) is a metaphysical thriller ostensibly based on the infiltration of an anarchist organisation by detectives, but the story is actually a vehicle for exploring society's power structures and the nature of suffering.

The fictional detective Sherlock Holmes, created by Arthur Conan Doyle, served as a spy hunter for the British government in the stories "The Adventure of the Second Stain" (1904), and "The Adventure of the Bruce-Partington Plans" (1912). In "His Last Bow" (1917), he served Crown and country as a double agent, transmitting false intelligence to Imperial Germany on the eve of the Great War.

The Scarlet Pimpernel (1905) by Baroness Orczy chronicled an English aristocrat's derring-do in rescuing French aristocrats from the Reign of Terror of the French Revolution (1789–99).

But the term "spy novel" was defined by The Riddle of the Sands (1903) by Irish author Erskine Childers. The Riddle of the Sands described a British yachtsman and his friend cruising off the North Sea coast of Germany who turned amateur spies when they discover a secret German plan to invade Britain. Its success created a market for the invasion literature subgenre, which was flooded by imitators. William Le Queux and E. Phillips Oppenheim became the most widely read and most successful British writers of spy fiction, especially of invasion literature. Their prosaic style and formulaic stories, produced voluminously from 1900 to 1914, proved of low literary merit.

=== During the First World War ===
During the War, John Buchan became the pre-eminent British spy novelist. His well-written stories portray the Great War as a "clash of civilisations" between Western civilization and barbarism. His notable novels are The Thirty-nine Steps (1915), Greenmantle (1916) and sequels, all featuring the heroic Scotsman Richard Hannay. In France Gaston Leroux published the spy thriller Rouletabille chez Krupp (1917), in which a detective, Joseph Rouletabille, engages in espionage.

=== Inter-war period ===
After the Russian Revolution (1917), the inter-war spy story usually concerns combating the Red Menace, which was perceived as another "clash of civilizations".

Spy fiction was dominated by British authors during this period, initially former intelligence officers and agents writing from inside the trade. Examples include Ashenden: Or the British Agent (1928) by W. Somerset Maugham, which accurately portrays spying in the First World War, and The Mystery of Tunnel 51 (1928) by Alexander Wilson whose novels convey an uncanny portrait of the first head of the Secret Intelligence Service, Mansfield Smith-Cumming, the original 'C'.

In the book Literary Agents (1987), Anthony Masters wrote: "Ashenden's adventures come nearest to the real-life experiences of his creator"'. John Le Carré described Ashenden stories as a major influence on his novels as praised Maugham as "the first person to write anything about espionage in a mood of disenchantment and almost prosaic reality".

At a more popular level, Leslie Charteris' popular and long-running Saint series began, featuring Simon Templar, with Meet the Tiger (1928). Water on the Brain (1933) by former intelligence officer Compton Mackenzie was the first successful spy novel satire. Prolific author Dennis Wheatley also wrote his first spy novel, The Eunuch of Stamboul (1935) during this period.

In the sham state of Manchukuo, spies often featured in stories published in its government-sponsored magazines as villains threatening Manchukuo. Manchukuo had been presented since its founding in 1931 as an idealistic Pan-Asian experiment, where the officially designated "five races" of the Japanese, Han Chinese, Manchus, Koreans and Mongols had come together to build a utopian society. Manchukuo also had a substantial Russian minority who initially been considered as the "sixth race", but had been excluded. The spy stories of Manchukuo such as "A Mixed Race Woman" by the writer Ding Na often linked the willingness to serve as spies with having a mixed Russian-Han heritage; the implication being that people of "pure" descent from one of the "five races" of Manchukuo would not betray it. In "A Mixed Race Woman", the villain initially appears to Mali, the eponymous character who has a Russian father and a Han mother, but she ultimately is revealed to be blackmailed by the story's true villain, the foreign spy Baoerdun, and she proves to be loyal to Manchukuo after all as she forces the gun out of Baoerdun's hand at the story's climax. However, Ding's story also states that Baoerdun would not dare to have attempted his blackmail scheme against a Han woman and that he targeted Mali because she was racially mixed and hence "weak".

When Japan invaded China in 1937 and even more so in 1941, the level of repression and propaganda in Manchukuo was increased as the state launched a "total war" campaign to mobilise society for the war. As part of the "total war" campaign, the state warned people to be vigilant at all times for spies; alongside this campaign went a mania for spy stories, which likewise warned people to be vigilant against spies. Novels and films with a counterespionage theme became ubiquitous in Manchukuo from 1937 onward. Despite the intensely patriarchal values of Manchukuo, the counter-spy campaign targeted women who were encouraged to report anyone suspicious to the police with one slogan saying, "Women defend inside and men defend outside". The spy stories of Manchukuo such as "A Mixed Race Woman" often had female protagonists. In "A Mixed Race Woman", it is two ordinary women who break up the spy ring instead of the Manchukuo police as might be expected. The South Korean scholar Bong InYoung noted stories such as "A Mixed Race Woman" were part of the state's campaign to take over "...the governance of private and family life, relying on the power of propaganda literature and the nationwide mobilization of the social discourse of counterespionage". At the same time, she noted "A Mixed Race Woman" with its intelligent female protagonists seemed to challenge the patriarchal values of Manchukuo which portrayed women as the weaker sex in need of male protection and guidance. However, Bong noted that the true heroine of "A Mixed Race Woman", Shulan is presented as superior to Mali as she is Han and the story is one "...of female disempowerment in that Mali is completely subordinate to the racial order Shulan sets".

=== Second World War ===
The growing support of fascism in Germany, Italy and Spain, and the imminence of war, attracted quality writers back to spy fiction.

British author Eric Ambler brought a new realism to spy fiction. The Dark Frontier (1936), Epitaph for a Spy (1938), The Mask of Dimitrios (US: A Coffin for Dimitrios, 1939), and Journey into Fear (1940) feature amateurs entangled in espionage. The politics and ideology are secondary to the personal story that involved the hero or heroine. Ambler's Popular Front–period œuvre has a left-wing perspective about the personal consequences of "big picture" politics and ideology, which was notable, given spy fiction's usual right-wing tilt in defence of establishment attitudes. Ambler's early novels Uncommon Danger (1937) and Cause for Alarm (1938), in which NKVD spies help the amateur protagonist survive, are especially remarkable among English-language spy fiction.

Above Suspicion (1939) by Helen MacInnes, about an anti-Nazi husband and wife spy team, features literate writing and fast-paced, intricate, and suspenseful stories occurring against contemporary historical backgrounds. MacInnes wrote many other spy novels in the course of a long career, including Assignment in Brittany (1942), Decision at Delphi (1961), and Ride a Pale Horse (1984).

Manning Coles published Drink to Yesterday (1940), a grim story occurring during the Great War, which introduces the hero Thomas Elphinstone Hambledon. However, later novels featuring Hambledon were lighter-toned, despite being set either in Nazi Germany or Britain during the Second World War (1939–45). After the War, the Hambledon adventures fell to formula, losing critical and popular interest.

The events leading up to the Second World War, and the War itself, continue to be fertile ground for authors of spy fiction. Notable examples include Ken Follett, Eye of the Needle (1978); Alan Furst, Night Soldiers (1988); and David Downing, the Station series, beginning with Zoo Station (2007).

=== Cold War ===
==== Early ====
The metamorphosis of the Second World War (1939–45) into the Soviet–American Cold War (1945–91) gave new impetus to spy novelists. Atomsk by Paul Linebarger (later known as Cordwainer Smith), written in 1948 and published in 1949, appears to be the first espionage novel of the dawning conflict.

The "secret world" of espionage allowed a situation when writers could project anything they wanted onto the "secret world". The author Bruce Page complained in his 1969 book The Philby Conspiracy:

The trouble is that a man can hold almost any theory he cares to about the secret world, and defend it against large quantities of hostile evidence by the simple expedient of retreating behind further and further screens of postulated inward mystery. Secret services have in common with Freemasons and mafiosi that they inhabit an intellectual twilight—a kind of ambiguous gloom in which it is hard to distinguish with certainty between the menacing and the merely ludicrous. In such circumstances the human affinity for myth and legend easily gets out of control

This inability to know for certain about what is going on in the "secret world" of intelligence-gathering affected both non-fiction and fiction books about espionage. The Cold War and the struggle between Soviet intelligence-known as the KGB from 1954 onward-vs. the CIA and MI6 made the subject of espionage a popular one for novelists to write about. Most of the spy novels of the Cold War were really action thrillers with little resemblance to the actual work of spies. The writer Malcolm Muggeridge who had worked as a spy in World War Two commented that thriller writers in the Cold War took to writing about espionage "as easily as the mentally unstable become psychiatrists or the impotent pornographers". The city that was considered to be the "capital of the Cold War" was Berlin, owing to its post-war status as the city was divided between the two German states while Britain, France, the Soviet Union and the United States all had occupations zones in Berlin. As a result, Berlin was a beehive of espionage during the Cold War with the city full of American, British, East German, French, Soviet and West German spies; it was estimated that there was an average of about 8,000 spies in Berlin at any given moment during the Cold War. Because Berlin was a center of espionage, the city was frequently a setting for spy novels and films. Furthermore, the construction of the Berlin Wall in 1961 made the wall into a symbol of Communist tyranny, which further increased the attraction for Western writers of setting a Cold War spy novel in Berlin. Perhaps the most memorable story set in Berlin was The Spy Who Came In From The Cold which in both the novel and the film ended with disillusioned British spy Alec Leamas and his lover, the naïve young woman Liz Gold being shot down while trying to cross the Berlin Wall from East Berlin into West Berlin.

===== British =====
With Secret Ministry (1951), Desmond Cory introduced Johnny Fedora, the secret agent with a licence to kill, the government-sanctioned assassin. Ian Fleming, a former member of naval intelligence, followed swiftly with the glamorous James Bond, secret agent 007 of the British Secret Service, a mixture of counter-intelligence officer, assassin and playboy. Perhaps the most famous fictional spy, Bond was introduced in Casino Royale (1953). After Fleming's death the franchise continued under other British and American authors, including Kingsley Amis, Christopher Wood, John Gardner, Raymond Benson, Sebastian Faulks, Jeffery Deaver, William Boyd and Anthony Horowitz. The Bond novels, which were extremely popular in the 1950s, inspired an even more popular series of films starting in 1962. The success of the Bond novels and films has greatly influenced popular images of the work of spies even though the character of Bond is more of an assassin than a spy.

Despite the commercial success of Fleming's extravagant novels, John le Carré, himself a former spy, created anti-heroic protagonists who struggled with the ethical issues involved in espionage and sometimes resorted to immoral tactics. Le Carré depicted spies as living a morally grey world having to constantly make morally dubious decisions in an essentially amoral struggle where lies, paranoia and betrayal are the norm for both sides. In le Carré best known novel, The Spy Who Came In From The Cold (1963), the hero Alec Leamas views himself as serving in "...a war fought on a tiny scale, at close range" and complained that he has seen too many "people cheated and misled, whole lives thrown away, people shot and in prison, whole groups and classes of men written off for nothing". Le Carré's middle-class hero George Smiley is a middle-aged spy burdened with an unfaithful, upper-class wife who publicly cuckolds him for sport. The American scholars Norman Polmar and Thomas Allen described Smiley as the fictional spy most likely to be successful as a real spy, citing le Carré's description of him in A Murder of Quality:

Obscurity was his nature, as well as his profession. The byways of espionage are not populated by the brash and colorful adventurers of fiction. A man who, like Smiley has lived and worked for years among his country's enemies learns only one prayer: that he may never, never be noticed. Assimilation is his highest aim, he learns to love the crowds who pass him in the street without a glance; he clings to them for his anonymity and his safety. His fear makes him servile—he could embrace the shoppers who jostle him in their impatience and force him from the pavement. He could adore the officials, the police, the bus conductors, for the terse indifference of their attitudes.
But this fear, this servility, this dependence had developed in Smiley a perception for the colour of human beings: a swift, feminine sensitivity to their characters and motives. He knew mankind as a huntsman knows his cover, as a fox the woods. For a spy must hunt while he is hunted, and the crowd is his estate. He could collect their gestures, record the interplay of glance and movement, as a huntsman can record the twisted bracken and broken twig, or as a fox detects the signs of danger

Like Le Carré, former British Intelligence officer Graham Greene also examined the morality of espionage in left-wing, anti-imperialist novels such as The Heart of the Matter (1948), set in Sierra Leone, the seriocomic Our Man in Havana (1959) occurring in Cuba under the regime of dictator Fulgencio Batista before his deposition in the Cuban Revolution (1953–59), and The Human Factor (1978) about a MI6 agent's attempts to uncover a mole in apartheid-era South Africa. Greene had worked as a MI6 agent in Freetown, an important British naval base during World War II, searching for German spies who would radio information about the movements of ships to the Kriegsmarine, experiences which inspired The Heart of the Matter. Greene's case officer during World War II was Harold "Kim" Philby, who was later revealed in 1963 to be a long time Soviet spy, who had been recruited by Soviet intelligence in the early 1930s while he was an undergraduate at Cambridge. Greene's best known spy novel The Quiet American (1955), set in 1952 Vietnam featured a thinly disguised version of the real American intelligence officer, Major General Edward Lansdale as the villain. Greene had covered the Vietnam war in 1951-52 as a newspaper correspondent where he met Lansdale who appears in The Quiet American as Alden Pyle while the character of Thomas Fowler, a cynical, but goodhearted British journalist in Saigon was partly based on himself.

MI6 was outraged by Our Man in Havana with its story of James Wormold, a British vacuum cleaner salesman in Cuba, recruited to work for MI6 who bamboozles his employers by selling them diagrams of vacuum cleaners, which he persuades MI6 are really diagrams of Soviet missiles. MI6 pressed for Greene to be prosecuted for violating the Official Secrets Act, claiming that he revealed too much about MI6's methods in Our Man in Havana, but it decided against charging Greene out of the fear that prosecuting him would suggest the unflattening picture of MI6 in Our Man in Havana was based on reality. Greene's older brother, Herbert, a professional con-man, had briefly worked as a spy for the Japanese in the 1930s before his employers realised that the "secrets" that he was selling them was merely information culled from the newspapers. The bumbling vacuum cleaner salesman Wormold in Our Man in Havana seems to have been inspired by Herbert Greene. In The Human Factor, Greene portrayed MI6 again in a highly unsympathetic light, depicting the British government as supporting the apartheid regime of South Africa because it was pro-Western while the book's protagonist, the MI6 officer Maurice Castle, married to a black South African woman, provides information to the KGB to thwart MI6 operations. Much of the plot of The Human Factor concerned a secret plan by the British, American and West German governments to buy up South African gold in bulk in order to stabilise the economy of South Africa, which Greene presented as fundamentally amoral, arguing that the Western powers were betraying their values by supporting the white supremacist South African government. Much controversy ensued when shortly after the publication of The Human Factor it emerged that such a plan had in fact been carried out, which led to much speculation about whether this was a coincidence or whether Greene had more access to secret information than he let on. There was also much speculation that the character of Maurice Castle was inspired by Philby, but Greene consistently denied this. Other novelists followed a similar path. Len Deighton's anonymous spy protagonist of The IPCRESS File (1962), Horse Under Water (1963), Funeral in Berlin (1964), and others, is a working-class man with a negative view of "the Establishment".

Other notable examples of espionage fiction during this period were also built around recurring characters. These include James Mitchell's 'John Craig' series, written under his pseudonym 'James Munro', beginning with The Man Who Sold Death (1964); and Trevor Dudley-Smith's Quiller spy novel series written under the pseudonym 'Adam Hall', beginning with The Berlin Memorandum (US: The Quiller Memorandum, 1965), a hybrid of glamour and dirt, Fleming and Le Carré; and William Garner's fantastic Michael Jagger in Overkill (1966), The Deep, Deep Freeze (1968), The Us or Them War (1969) and A Big Enough Wreath (1974).

Other important British writers who first became active in spy fiction during this period include Padraig Manning O'Brine, Killers Must Eat (1951); Michael Gilbert, Be Shot for Sixpence (1956); Alistair MacLean, The Last Frontier (1959); Brian Cleeve, Assignment to Vengeance (1961); Jack Higgins, The Testament of Caspar Schulz (1962); and Desmond Skirrow, It Won't Get You Anywhere (1966). Dennis Wheatley's 'Gregory Sallust' (1934-1968) and 'Roger Brook' (1947-1974) series were also largely written during this period.

Notable recurring characters from this era include Adam Diment's Philip McAlpine as a long-haired, hashish-smoking fop in the novels The Dolly Dolly Spy (1967), The Great Spy Race (1968), The Bang Bang Birds (1968) and Think, Inc. (1971); James Mitchell's 'David Callan' series, written in his own name, beginning with Red File for Callan (1969); William Garner's John Morpurgo in Think Big, Think Dirty (1983), Rats' Alley (1984), and Zones of Silence (1986); and Joseph Hone's 'Peter Marlow' series, beginning with The Private Sector (1971), set during Israel's Six-Day War (1967) against Egypt, Jordan and Syria. In all of these series the writing is literary and the tradecraft believable.

Noteworthy examples of the journalistic style and successful integration of fictional characters with historical events were the politico-military novels The Day of the Jackal (1971) by Frederick Forsyth and Eye of the Needle (1978) by Ken Follett. With the explosion of technology, Craig Thomas, launched the techno-thriller with Firefox (1977), describing the Anglo–American theft of a superior Soviet jet aeroplane.

Other important British writers who first became active in spy fiction during this period include Ian Mackintosh, A Slaying in September (1967); Kenneth Benton, Twenty-fourth Level (1969); Desmond Bagley, Running Blind (1970); Anthony Price, The Labyrinth Makers (1971); Gerald Seymour, Harry's Game (1975); Brian Freemantle, Charlie M (1977); Bryan Forbes, Familiar Strangers (1979); Reginald Hill, The Spy's Wife (1980); and Raymond Harold Sawkins, writing as Colin Forbes, Double Jeopardy (1982).

Philip Gooden provides an analysis of British spy fiction in four categories: professionals, amateurs, dandies and literary types.

===== American =====
During the war E. Howard Hunt wrote his first spy novel, East of Farewell (1943). In 1949 he joined the recently created CIA and continued to write spy fiction for many years. Paul Linebarger, a China specialist for the CIA, published Atomsk, the first novel of the Cold War, in 1949. During the 1950s, most of American spy stories were not about the CIA, instead being about agents from the Federal Bureau of Investigation (FBI) who tracked down and arrested Soviet spies. The popular American image of the FBI was as "coolly efficient super-cop" who always successful in performing his duties. The FBI director, J. Edgar Hoover, had long cultivated the American press and Hollywood to promote a favorable image of the FBI. In 1955, Edward S. Aarons began publishing the Sam Durell CIA "Assignment" series, which began with Assignment to Disaster (1955). Donald Hamilton published Death of a Citizen (1960) and The Wrecking Crew (1960), beginning the series featuring Matt Helm, a CIA assassin and counter-intelligence agent.

Major General Edward Lansdale, a charismatic intelligence officer who was widely credited with having masterminded the defeat of the Communist Huk rebellion in the Philippines, inspired several fictional versions of himself. Besides for The Quiet American, he appeared as Colonel Edwin Barnum in The Ugly American (1958) by William J. Lederer and Eugene Burdick and as Colonel Lionel Teryman in the novel La Mal Jaune (1965) by the French writer Jean Lartéguy. The Ugly American was written as a rebuttal to The Quiet American under which the idealistic Colonel Barnum operating in the fictional Vietnam-like Southeast Asian nation of Sarkhan shows the way to defeat Communist guerillas by understanding local people in just the same way that Lansdale with his understanding and sympathy for ordinary Filipinos was credited with defeating the Communist Huk guerrillas. The Ugly American was greatly influenced by the modernization theory, which held Communism was something alike to a childhood disease as the modernization theory held that as Third World nations modernized that this created social-economic tensions which a ruthless minority of Communists exploited to seize power; what was required from the United States were experts who knew the local concerns in order to defeat the Communists until the modernization process was completed.

The Nick Carter-Killmaster series of spy novels, initiated by Michael Avallone and Valerie Moolman, but authored anonymously, ran to over 260 separate books between 1964 and the early 1990s and invariably pitted American, Soviet and Chinese spies against each other. With the proliferation of male protagonists in the spy fiction genre, writers and book packagers also started bringing out spy fiction with a female as the protagonist. One notable spy series is The Baroness, featuring a sexy female superspy, with the novels being more action-oriented, in the mould of Nick Carter-Killmaster.

Other important American authors who became active in spy fiction during this period include Ross Thomas, The Cold War Swap (1966). The Scarlatti Inheritance (1971) by Robert Ludlum is usually considered the first American modern (glamour and dirt) spy thriller weighing action and reflection. Richard Helms, the director-general of the CIA from 1966 to 1973 loathed le Carré's morally grey spy novels, which he felt damaged the image of the CIA, and encouraged Hunt to write spy novels as a rebuttal. Helms had hopes that Hunt might write an "American James Bond" novel, which would be adopted by Hollywood and do for the image of the CIA what Fleming's Bond novels did for the image of MI6. In the 1970s, former CIA man Charles McCarry began the Paul Christopher series with The Miernik Dossier (1973) and The Tears of Autumn (1978), which were well written, with believable tradecraft. McCarry was a former CIA agent who worked as an editor for National Geographic and his hero Christopher likewise is an American spy who works for a thinly disguised version of the CIA while posing as a journalist. Writing under the pen name Trevanian, Roger Whitaker published a series of brutal spy novels starting with The Eiger Sanction (1972) featuring an amoral art collector/CIA assassin who ostensibly kills for the United States, but in fact kills for money. Whitaker followed up The Eiger Sanction with The Loo Sanction (1973) and Shibumi (1979). Starting in 1976 with his novel Saving the Queen, the conservative American journalist and former CIA agent William F. Buckley published the first of his Blackford Oakes novels featuring a CIA agent whose politics were the same as the author's. Blackford Oakes was portrayed as a "sort of an American James Bond" who ruthlessly dispatches villainous KGB agents with much aplomb.

The first American techno-thriller was The Hunt for Red October (1984) by Tom Clancy. It introduced CIA deskman (analyst) Jack Ryan as a field agent; he reprised the role in the sequel The Cardinal of the Kremlin (1987).

Other important American authors who became active in spy fiction during this period include Robert Littell, The Defection of A. J. Lewinter (1973); James Grady, Six Days of the Condor (1974); William F. Buckley Jr., Saving the Queen (1976); Nelson DeMille, The Talbot Odyssey (1984); W. E. B. Griffin, the Men at War series (1984–); Stephen Coonts, Flight of the Intruder (1986); Canadian-American author David Morrell, The League of Night and Fog (1987); David Hagberg, Without Honor (1989); Noel Hynd, False Flags (1990); and Richard Ferguson, Oiorpata (1990).

==== Soviet ====
The culture of Imperial Russia was deeply influenced by the culture of France, and traditionally spy novels in France had a very low status. One consequence of the French influence on Russian culture was that the subject of espionage was usually ignored by Russian writers during the Imperial period. Traditionally, the subject of espionage was treated in the Soviet Union as a story of villainous foreign spies threatening the USSR. The organisation established to hunt down German spies in 1943, SMERSH, was an acronym for the wartime slogan Smert shpionam! ("Death to Spies!"), which reflected the picture promoted by the Soviet state of spies as a class of people who deserved to be killed without mercy. The unfavorable picture of spies ensured that before the early 1960s there were no novels featuring Soviet spies as the heroes as espionage was portrayed as a disreputable activity that only the enemies of the Soviet Union engaged in. Unlike in Britain and the United States, where the achievements of Anglo-American intelligence during the Second World War were to a certain extent publicized soon after the war such as the fact that the Americans had broken the Japanese naval codes (which came out in 1946) and the British deception operation of 1943, Operation Mincemeat (which was revealed in 1953), there was nothing equivalent in the Soviet Union until the early 1960s. Soviet novels prior to the 1960s to the extent that espionage was portrayed at all concerned heroic scouts in the Red Army who during the Great Patriotic War as the war with Germany is known in the Soviet Union who go on dangerous missions deep behind the Wehrmacht's lines to find crucial information. The scout stories were more action-adventure stories than espionage stories proper and significantly always portrayed Red Army scouts rather than Chekisty ("Chekists") as secret policemen are always called in Russia as their heroes. The protagonists of the scout stories always almost ended being killed at the climax of the stories, giving up their lives up to save the Motherland from the German invaders.

In November 1961, Vladimir Semichastny became the chairman of the KGB and sent out to improve the image of the Chekisty. The acronym KGB (Komitet Gosudarstvennoy Bezopasnosti-Committee of State Security) was adopted in 1954, but the organisation had been founded in 1917 as the Cheka. The frequent name changes for the secret police made no impression with the Russian people who still call any secret policeman a Chekisty. Semichastny felt that the legacy of the Yezhovshchina ("Yezhovz times") of 1936-1939 had given the KGB a fearsome reputation that he wanted to erase as wanted ordinary people to have a more favorable and positive image of the Chekisty as the protectors and defenders of the Soviet Union instead of torturers and killers. As such, Semichastny encouraged the publication of a series of spy novels that featured heroic Chekisty defending the Soviet Union. It was also during Semichastny's time as KGB chairman that the cult of the "hero spies" began in the Soviet Union as publications lionised the achievements of Soviet spies such as Colonel Rudolf Abel, Harold "Kim" Philby, Richard Sorge and of the men and women who served in the Rote Kapelle spy network. Seeing the great popularity of Ian Fleming's James Bond novels in Britain and the United States, Soviet spy novels of the 1960s used the Bond novels as inspiration for both their plots and heroes, through Soviet prurience about sex ensured that the Chekisty heroes did not engage in the sort of womanising that Bond did. The first Bond-style novel was The Zakhov Mission (1963) by the Bulgarian writer Andrei Gulyashki who had commissioned by Semichastny and was published simultaneously in Russian and Bulgarian. The success of The Zakhov Mission led to a follow-up novel, Zakhov vs. 007, where Gulyashki freely violated English copyright laws by using the James Bond character without the permission of the Fleming estate (he had asked for permission in 1966 and was denied). In Zakhov vs. 007, the hero Avakoum Zakhov defeats James Bond, who is portrayed in an inverted fashion to how Fleming portrayed him; in Zakhov vs. 007, Bond is portrayed as a sadistic killer, a brutal rapist and an arrogant misogynist, which stands in marked contrast to the kindly and gentle Zakhov who always treats women with respect. Zakhov is described as a spy, he more of a detective and unlike Bond, his tastes are modest.

In 1966, the Soviet writer Yulian Semyonov published a novel set in the Russian Civil War featuring a Cheka agent Maxim Maximovich Isaуev as its hero. Inspired by its success, the KGB encouraged Semyonov to write a sequel, Semnadtsat' mgnoveniy vesny ("Seventeen Moments of Spring"), which proved to one of the most popular Soviet spy novels when it was serialized in Pravda in January–February 1969 and then published as a book later in 1969. In Seventeen Moments of Spring, the story is set in the Great Patriotic War as Isayev goes undercover, using the alias of a Baltic German nobleman Max Otto von Stierlitz to infiltrate the German high command. The plot of Seventeen Moments of Spring takes place in Berlin between January–May 1945 during the last days of the Third Reich as the Red Army advances onto Berlin and the Nazis grew more desperate. In 1973, Semnadtsat' mgnoveniy vesny was turned into a television mini-series, which was extremely popular in the Soviet Union and turned the Isayev character into a cultural phenomena. The Isayev character plays a role in Russian culture, even today, that is analogous to the role James Bond plays in modern British culture. As aspect of Seventeen Moments of Spring, both as a novel and the TV mini-series that has offended Westerners who are more accustomed to seeing spy stories via the prism of the fast-paced Bond stories is the way that Isayev spends much time interacting with ordinary Germans despite the fact these interactions do nothing to advance the plot and are merely superfluous to the story. However, the point of these scenes are to show that Isayev is still a moral human being, who remains sociable and kind to all people, including the citizens of the state that his country is at war with. Unlike Bond, Isayev is devoted to his wife who he deeply loves and despite spending at least ten years as a spy in Germany and having countless chances to sleep with attractive German women remains faithful towards her. Through Isayev is a spy for the NKVD as the Soviet secret police was known from 1934 to 1946, it is stated quite explicitly in Semnadtsat' mgnoveniy vesny (which is set in 1945) that he left the Soviet Union to go undercover in Nazi Germany "more than ten years ago", which means that Isayev was not involved in the Yezhovshchina.

==== Later ====
The June 1967 Six-Day War between Israel and its neighbours introduced new themes to espionage fiction—the conflict between Israel and the Palestinians, against the backdrop of continuing Cold War tensions, and the increasing use of terrorism as a political tool.

=== Post–Cold War ===
The end of the Cold War in 1991 mooted the USSR, Russia and other Iron Curtain countries as credible enemies of democracy, and the US Congress even considered disestablishing the CIA. Espionage novelists found themselves at a temporary loss for obvious nemeses. The New York Times ceased publishing a spy novel review column. Nevertheless, counting on the aficionado, publishers continued to issue spy novels by writers popular during the Cold War era, among them Harlot's Ghost (1991) by Norman Mailer.

In the US, the new novels Moscow Club (1991) by Joseph Finder, Coyote Bird (1993) by Jim DeFelice, Masquerade (1996) by Gayle Lynds, and The Unlikely Spy (1996) by Daniel Silva maintained the spy novel in the post–Cold War world. Other important American authors who first became active in spy fiction during this period include David Ignatius, Agents of Innocence (1997); David Baldacci, Saving Faith (1999); and Vince Flynn, with Term Limits (1999) and a series of novels featuring counter-terrorism expert Mitch Rapp.

In 1993, the American novelist Philip Roth published Operation Shylock, an account of his supposed work as a Mossad spy in Greece. The book was published as a novel, but Roth insisted that the book was not a novel as he argued that the book was presented only as a novel in order to give it deniability. At the end of the book, the character of Philip Roth is ordered to publish the account as a novel, and it ends with Roth the character saying: "And I became quite convinced that it was my interest to do that...I'm just a good Mossadnik".

In the UK, Robert Harris entered the spy genre with Enigma (1995). Other important British authors who became active during this period include Hugh Laurie, The Gun Seller (1996); Andy McNab, Remote Control (1998); Henry Porter, Remembrance Day (2000); and Charles Cumming, A Spy By Nature (2001).

=== Post–9/11 ===
The terrorist attacks against the US on 11 September 2001, and the subsequent war on terror, reawakened interest in the peoples and politics of the world beyond its borders. Espionage genre elders such as John le Carré, Frederick Forsyth, Robert Littell, and Charles McCarry resumed work, and many new authors emerged.

Important British writers who wrote their first spy novels during this period include Stephen Leather, Hard Landing (2004); and William Boyd, Restless (2006).

New American writers include Brad Thor, The Lions of Lucerne (2002); Ted Bell, Hawke (2003); Alex Berenson, with John Wells appearing for the first time in The Faithful Spy (2006); Brett Battles, The Cleaner (2007); Ellis Goodman, Bear Any Burden (2008); Olen Steinhauer, The Tourist (2009); and Richard Ferguson, Oiorpata (2012). A number of other established writers began to write spy fiction for the first time, including Kyle Mills, Fade (2005) and James Patterson, Private (2010).

Swede Stieg Larsson, who died in 2004, was the world's second best-selling author for 2008 due to his Millennium series, featuring Lisbeth Salander, published posthumously between 2005 and 2007. Other authors of note include Australian James Phelan, beginning with Fox Hunt (2010).

Recognising the importance of the thriller genre, including spy fiction, International Thriller Writers (ITW) was established in 2004, and held its first conference in 2006.

== Insider spy fiction ==
Many authors of spy fiction have themselves been intelligence officers working for British agencies such as MI5 or MI6, or American agencies such as the OSS or its successor, the CIA. 'Insider' spy fiction has a special claim to authenticity and overlaps with biographical and other documentary accounts of secret service.

The first insider fiction emerged after World War 1 as the thinly disguised reminiscences of former British intelligence officers such as W. Somerset Maugham, Alexander Wilson, and Compton Mackenzie. The tradition continued during World War II with Helen MacInnes and Manning Coles.

Notable British examples from the Cold War period and beyond include Ian Fleming, John le Carré, Graham Greene, Brian Cleeve, Ian Mackintosh, Kenneth Benton, Bryan Forbes, Andy McNab and Chris Ryan. Notable American examples include Charles McCarry, William F. Buckley Jr., W. E. B. Griffin and David Hagberg.

Many post-9/11 period novels are written by insiders. At the CIA, the number of manuscripts submitted for pre-publication vetting doubled between 1998 and 2005. American examples include Barry Eisler, A Clean Kill in Tokyo (2002); Charles Gillen, Saigon Station (2003); R J Hillhouse, Rift Zone (2004); Gene Coyle, The Dream Merchant of Lisbon (2004) and No Game For Amateurs (2009); Thomas F. Murphy, Edge of Allegiance (2005); Mike Ramsdell, A Train to Potevka (2005); T. H. E. Hill, Voices Under Berlin: The Tale of a Monterey Mary (2008); Duane Evans, North from Calcutta (2009); Jason Matthews, Red Sparrow (2013).; and T.L. Williams, Zero Day: China's Cyber Wars (2017).

British examples include The Code Snatch (2001) by Alan Stripp, formerly a cryptographer at Bletchley Park; At Risk (2004), Secret Asset (2006), Illegal Action (2007), and Dead Line (2008), by Dame Stella Rimington (Director General of MI5 from 1992 to 1996); and Matthew Dunn's Spycatcher (2011) and sequels.

== Spy television and cinema ==
=== Cinema ===
Much spy fiction was adapted as spy films in the 1960s, ranging from the fantastical James Bond series to the realistic The Spy Who Came in from the Cold (1965), and the hybrid The Quiller Memorandum (1966). While Hamilton's Matt Helm novels were adult and well written, their cinematic interpretations were adolescent parody. This phenomenon spread widely in Europe in the 1960s and is known as the Eurospy genre.

English-language spy films of the 2000s include The Bourne Identity (2002), Mission: Impossible (1996), Munich (2005), Syriana (2005), and The Constant Gardener (2005).

Among the comedy films focusing on espionage are 1974's S*P*Y*S, 1985's Spies Like Us, and the Austin Powers film series starring Mike Myers.

=== Television ===
The American adaptation of Casino Royale (1954) featured Jimmy Bond in an episode of the Climax! anthology series. The narrative tone of television espionage ranged from the drama of Danger Man (1960–1968) to the sardonicism of The Man from U.N.C.L.E. (1964–1968) and the flippancy of I Spy (1965–1968) until the exaggeration, akin to that of William Le Queux and E. Phillips Oppenheim before the World War I, degenerated to the parody of Get Smart (1965–1970).

In 1973, Semyonov's novel Seventeen Moments of Spring (1968) was adapted to television as a twelve-part miniseries about the Soviet spy Maksim Isaev operating in wartime Nazi Germany as Max Otto von Stierlitz, charged with preventing a separate peace between Nazi Germany and America which would exclude the USSR. The programme TASS Is Authorized to Declare... also derives from his work.

However, the circle closed in the late 1970s when The Sandbaggers (1978–1980) presented the grit and bureaucracy of espionage.

In the 1980s, American television featured the light espionage programmes Airwolf (1984–87) and MacGyver (1985–92), each rooted in the Cold War yet reflecting American citizens' distrust of their government, after the crimes of the Nixon government (the internal, political espionage of the Watergate Scandal and the Vietnam War) were exposed. The spy heroes were independent of government; MacGyver, in later episodes and post-DXS employment, works for a non-profit, private think tank, and aviator Hawke and two friends work free-lance adventures. Although each series features an intelligence agency, the DXS in MacGyver, and the Firm in Airwolf, its agents could alternately serve as adversaries as well as allies for the heroes.

Television espionage programmes of the late 1990s to the early 2010s include La Femme Nikita (1997–2001), Alias (2001–2006), 24 (2001–2010, 2014), Spooks in the UK (released as MI-5 in the US and Canada; 2002–2011), CBBC's The Secret Show (2006–2011), NBC's Chuck (2007–2012), FX's Archer (2009–2023), Burn Notice (2007–2013), Covert Affairs (2010–2014), Homeland (2011–2020), The Americans (2013–2018) and ABC's Agents of S.H.I.E.L.D. (2013–2020).

Deutschland 83 is a 2015 German television series starring a 24-year-old native of East Germany who is sent to the West as an undercover spy for the HVA, the foreign intelligence agency of the Stasi.

== For children and adolescents ==
=== Books and novels ===
In every medium, spy thrillers introduce children and adolescents to deception and espionage at earlier ages. The genre ranges from action-adventure, such as Chris Ryan's Alpha Force series, through the historical espionage dramas of Y. S. Lee, to the girl orientation of Ally Carter's Gallagher Girls series, beginning with I'd Tell You I Love You, But Then I'd Have to Kill You.

Leading examples include the Agent Cody Banks film, the Alex Rider adventure novels by Anthony Horowitz, and the CHERUB series, by Robert Muchamore. Ben Allsop, one of England's youngest novelists, also writes spy fiction. His titles include Sharp and The Perfect Kill.

Other authors writing for adolescents include A. J. Butcher, Joe Craig, Charlie Higson, Andy McNab and Francine Pascal.

=== Films and shows ===
Spy-related films that are aimed towards younger audiences include movies such as the Spy Kids series of films and The Spy Next Door. Shows and series in this category also include a subplot of Phineas and Ferb following Perry the Platypus in his attempt to sabotage Doofenshmirtz's plans to take over the geographically ambiguous Tri-state area. However, the Cartoon Network show Codename: Kids Next Door is solely focused on the eponymous Kids Next Door organization, consisting of child spies and child soldiers fighting and spying on adult and teenage villains, who are personifications of the things children dislike while growing up (e.g. bullying, grounding, homework, going to the dentist, going to school, being force-fed vegetables, getting banned from drinking soda, helicopter parenting, piano lessons, and spanking), and whilst not being traditional government sponsored intelligence, the Kids Next Door market themselves as so. Another example of a kids' show in the spy genre is Disney's Kim Possible, which centers on the eponymous protagonist as she fights megalomaniac villains in a similar manner to James Bond, while foiling the evil plans of the main antagonist of the show, Dr. Drakken.

== Video games, tabletop roleplaying games and theme parks ==
In contemporary digital video games, the player can be a vicarious spy, as in Team Fortress 2 and the Metal Gear series, especially in the series' third installment, Metal Gear Solid, unlike the games of the third-person shooter genre, Syphon Filter, and Splinter Cell. The games feature complex stories and cinematic images. Games such as No One Lives Forever and the sequel No One Lives Forever 2: A Spy in H.A.R.M.'s Way humorously combine espionage and 1960s design. Evil Genius, a real-time strategy game and contemporary of the No One Lives Forever series, allows the player to take on the role of the villain in a setting heavily influenced by spy thriller fiction like the James Bond series.

The Deus Ex series, particularly Deus Ex: Human Revolution and Deus Ex: Mankind Divided, are also examples of spy fiction. Protagonist Adam Jensen must frequently use spycraft and stealth to obtain sensitive information for a variety of clients and associates.

Top Secret, TSR, Inc., (1980) is a contemporary espionage-themed tabletop role-playing game

James Bond 007: Role-Playing In Her Majesty's Secret Service, Victory Games (1983), is a tabletop roleplaying game based on Fleming's 007 novels.

Activision published Spycraft: The Great Game (1996), notable for the collaboration with former CIA director William Colby and former KGB Major-General Oleg Kalugin, who also appear in the game as themselves.

Namco Bandai's Time Crisis series of light gun shooters centers on the exploits of a fictional multinational intelligence agency called the VSSE (Vital Situation, Swift Elimination), whose agents, armed with a license to kill, must stop terrorists and megalomaniac villains in a similar manner to Mission: Impossible and the James Bond movies.

The Spyland espionage theme park, in the Gran Scala pleasure dome, in Zaragoza province, Spain, opened in 2012.

== Subgenres ==
- Spy comedy: usually parody the clichés and camp elements characteristic to the espionage genre.
- Spy horror: spy fiction with horror fiction.
- Spy thriller: the most common subgenre of spy fiction
- Spy-fi: spy fiction with elements of science fiction.

== Notable writers ==
=== Deceased ===
- Edward Aarons
- Eric Ambler
- Desmond Bagley
- Ted Bell
- Kenneth Benton
- John Buchan
- William F. Buckley Jr.
- Leslie Charteris
- Erskine Childers
- Tom Clancy
- Andrew Britton
- Brian Cleeve
- Manning Coles
- Jonathan de Shalit
- Sir Arthur Conan Doyle
- Joseph Conrad
- James Fenimore Cooper
- Desmond Cory
- Ian Fleming
- Vince Flynn
- Charlie Flowers
- Bryan Forbes
- Frederick Forsyth
- David Hagberg
- Colin Forbes
- John Gardner
- William Garner
- Michael Gilbert
- Graham Greene
- W. E. B. Griffin
- Adam Hall
- Donald Hamilton
- Jack Higgins
- Reginald Hill
- E. Howard Hunt
- Qazi Anwar Hussain
- Rudyard Kipling
- Stieg Larsson
- John le Carré
- Gaston Leroux
- Paul Linebarger
- Robert Ludlum
- Charles McCarry
- Helen MacInnes
- Ian Mackintosh
- Alistair MacLean
- Norman Mailer
- Jason Matthews
- Somerset Maugham
- James Munro
- Manning O'Brine
- E. Phillips Oppenheim
- Baroness Orczy
- Anthony Price
- William le Queux
- Ibn-e-Safi
- Raymond Harold Sawkins
- Desmond Skirrow
- Cordwainer Smith
- Craig Thomas
- Ross Thomas
- Gérard de Villiers
- Dennis Wheatley
- Alexander Wilson
- Joseph Hone
- Brian Freemantle
- Nelson DeMille
- Stella Rimington
- Len Deighton

=== Living ===
- David Baldacci
- Brett Battles
- Raymond Benson
- Alex Berenson
- William Boyd
- A. J. Butcher
- Ally Carter
- Alex Carr
- Stephen Coonts
- Gene Coyle
- Joe Craig
- Charles Cumming
- Jeffery Deaver
- Jim DeFelice
- Adam Diment
- Frazer Douglas
- David Downing
- Matthew Dunn
- Tatsuya Endo
- Barry Eisler
- Duane Evans
- Joseph Finder
- Richard Ferguson
- Ken Follett
- Alan Furst
- Charles E. Gillen
- Ellis Goodman
- James Grady
- John Griffiths
- Jan Guillou
- Robert Harris
- Mick Herron
- Charlie Higson
- T. H. E. Hill
- R J Hillhouse
- Anthony Horowitz
- Noel Hynd
- David Ignatius
- Joseph Kanon
- Hugh Laurie
- Stephen Leather
- Y. S. Lee
- Robert Littell
- Gayle Lynds
- Andy McNab
- Kyle Mills
- David Morrell
- Robert Muchamore
- Thomas F. Murphy
- James Patterson
- James Phelan
- Henry Porter
- Mike Ramsdell
- Chris Ryan
- Gerald Seymour
- Daniel Silva
- Olen Steinhauer
- Agnieszka Stelmaszyk
- Alan Stripp
- Khalid Talib (Smokescreen)
- Ron Terpening
- Brad Thor

== See also ==
- Category:Espionage television series
- Category:Espionage television series by country
- Category:Spy films
- History of espionage
- List of fictional secret agents
- List of genres
- List of thriller writers
- Spy music
- Thriller (genre)
