= I'd Tell You I Love You, But Then I'd Have to Kill You =

2006 novel by Ally Carter

I'd Tell You I Love You, But Then I'd Have To Kill You
- US hardback cover
- Author: Ally Carter
- Translator: English
- Language: English
- Series: Gallagher Girls
- Genre: Romance/adventure/spy fiction
- Publisher: Hyperion Books for Children
- Publication date: April 1, 2006
- Publication place: United States
- Media type: Print (hardcover)
- Pages: 284
- ISBN: 978-1-4231-0003-4
- OCLC: 62536023
- Followed by: Cross My Heart and Hope to Spy

I'd Tell You I Love You, But Then I'd Have to Kill You (2006) is a young adult fiction novel written by Ally Carter and is the first of seven books in the Gallagher Girls series. In October 2007, a sequel was released titled Cross My Heart and Hope to Spy.

== Reception ==
Critical reception to I'd Tell You I Love You, But Then I'd Have to Kill You was mixed. A review for the School Library Journal said it was amusing, but lacked "appeal." Publishers Weekly praised the book's tension while stating that they wished the character of Macey had been more fully developed (the character was more fully developed in later books). Common Sense Media wrote that the book was a "fun debut" without much controversial material.

== Movie adaptation ==
I'd Tell You I Love You, But Then I'd Have to Kill You was initially optioned for film by Disney, with the option later being sold to Walden Media. In June 2009 the movie option expired. Carter announced in August 2013 that production company Tonik had optioned the series for film.

== Plot ==
15-year-old Cammie Morgan attends an all-girls school for spies, Gallagher Academy. Cammie is an accomplished spy-in-training, fluent in various languages and adept in combat. When out on an assignment, she is spotted by Josh, an ordinary teenage boy, and begins to develop feelings for him. Josh is unaware of her secret identity and believes she is a normal girl who is being homeschooled. Cammie enters a relationship with Josh while trying to keep her spy life a secret.

== Series ==
The Gallagher Girls Series consists of seven books:

1. I'd Tell You I Love You, But Then I'd Have to Kill You
2. Cross My Heart and Hope to Spy
3. Don't Judge a Girl by Her Cover
4. Only the Good Spy Young
5. Out of Sight, Out of Time
6. United We Spy
7. The Spies That Bind

The first six in the series follow one after the other while The Spies That Bind is an audiobook prequel that follows Cammie Morgan when she first started at The Gallagher Academy for Exceptional Young Women.

| Preceded by None | Gallagher Girls Series; Book 1 | Succeeded by Cross My Heart and Hope to Spy |
