= The House at Pluck's Gutter =

Novel by Manning Coles

First edition (publ. Hodder & Stoughton)

The House at Pluck's Gutter is a novel by Manning Coles, published in 1963, featuring the protagonist Thomas Elphinstone Hambledon.

The book was named after the old Ferry Cottage at Plucks Gutter.
