= Thomas F. Murphy =

Thomas F. Murphy may refer to:

- Thomas F. Murphy (author) (born 1939), American author
- Thomas Francis Murphy (1905–1995), American federal prosecutor and judge
