= Spy in Chancery =

1972 novel by Kenneth Benton

- First edition
- Author: Kenneth Benton
- Language: English
- Genre: Spy novel
- Publisher: Collins
- Publication date: 1972; 2011
- Publication place: United Kingdom
- Media type: Print (Hardcover and Paperback); Digital (ebook)
- ISBN: 0-00-231768-0 (first edition, hardback)

Spy in Chancery is a spy novel by Kenneth Benton set in Rome during the Cold War in the 1970s. The book begins with a foreword by novelist Michael Gilbert, and is the third novel to feature Overseas Police Adviser Peter Craig. Craig travels to Rome for a conference, and is caught up in investigating a spy at the British Embassy.

== Plot summary ==
The novel begins in Paris, as an MI6 officer prepares to meet a would-be Soviet defector. The meeting turns sour and the MI6 man is murdered after learning that the KGB have a mole in the British Embassy in Rome, but his killers do not realise that a concealed microphone has recorded everything.

Craig, in Rome for a security conference, is briefed by MI6 to investigate the Embassy and find the mole. Craig interviews the main suspects, Adams, Ransome and Warren, and discovers that all have motive as well as opportunity to work with the Russians.

Craig meets Ashbee to coordinate his investigation with the CIA, who tells him about the illegal Soviet residency in Rome. Sir Watkyn volunteers to send false messages, implying that MI6 is blackmailing the Russian Ambassador, in order to lure out the spy. The KGB abduct Ashbee, blaming the Roman mafia for the kidnapping. With Kahn's help, Craig approaches the Roman mafia and convinces them that the KGB has set them up and caused the CIA to investigate them. With the help of the mafia, Craig rescues Ashbee and captures the KGB agents.

Still needing to find the source of the Embassy leaks, Craig allows Zakharov to escape and follows him to discover the mole.

== Characters in "Spy in Chancery" ==
- Peter Craig – protagonist; international police advisor for Her Majesty's Government
- Sir Watkyn Rees – British Ambassador in Rome
- Neil Adams – Embassy Scientific Officer
- John Bracken – Head of Chancery
- Diana Warren – his secretary
- Janet Ransome – PA to the Ambassador
- Jo Ashbee – Head of CIA mission, Rome
- Luigi Kahn – Italian/Russian surveillance agent
- Vishinsky – Russian Ambassador to Rome
- Zakharov – KGB agent
