= Sole Agent =

1970 novel by Kenneth Benton

- First edition
- Author: Kenneth Benton
- Language: English
- Genre: Spy novel
- Publisher: WM Collins
- Publication date: 1970; 2011
- Publication place: United Kingdom
- Media type: Print (Hardcover and Paperback); Digital (ebook)
- ISBN: 0-80-275286-1 (first edition, hardback)

Sole Agent is a spy novel by Kenneth Benton set in Lisbon during the Cold War in the 1970s.

== Plot summary ==
Overseas Police Adviser Peter Craig, on a cruise bound for Naples, stops in Lisbon to catch up with Ferreira, a former colleague who now runs a department of the PIDE security service. Craig calls at the British Embassy to announce his visit and is introduced to Simon Dickens, Head of Chancery. Dickens takes Craig into his confidence and explains that the Amanda, daughter of the Embassy's Defence Attaché has recently gone missing, and asks for his help in finding her. Craig reluctantly agrees to ask Ferreira. Over lunch, Ferreira reveals that PIDE has been monitoring Amanda because of her links with a revolutionary group, and have reports of her leaving a party the evening before with Joao Goncalves Costa, the leader of that group. Ferreira requests that Amanda be questioned by his men before being released; Craig, mindful of avoiding a scandal, insists that she instead return to the Embassy to be deported immediately.

Craig reports back to the Embassy, meeting the withering Ambassador in the process. Craig's plan to continue his cruise is frustrated as the ship is docked for repairs, and he reluctantly agrees to help with the search for Amanda, which leads first to her ex-boyfriend and then to a villa outside the city. Craig realises that PIDE agents are tailing him, and evades them.

At the villa, Craig discovers Joao's corpse and confronts Amanda, who explains that he was killed by a Russian intelligence officer, Rogov, under cover as Oxford professor Milo Janek, who had recruited her two years earlier as a mole because of her links with the Embassy. Rogov was concerned that her involvement with Joao and the group would blow her cover. However, her eventual goal is to become a double agent for MI5.

Craig is mistrustful of Amanda's motives, and is about to take her back to the Embassy when Rogov arrives with Luiz, a henchman from the local illegal residency. After a standoff, Rogov catches Craig and Amanda trying to escape, and captures them. Craig convinces Rogov that Amanda has told him very little about her plans, and the four drive away to dispose of Joao's body. On the way, Craig causes a car crash and in the ensuing fight Luiz is killed and Rogov escapes. Further down the road, they find Rogov's crashed car and another fight ensues: Craig is shot and eventually Rogov is subdued and left for the police to find him. Craig and Amanda make their way back to town, still avoiding the PIDE who by now are actively searching for her.

Craig leaves Amanda at a safe house and bargains with Ferreira, telling him that Rogov, the son of a Red Army general, is worth more to the PIDE than Amanda. Ferreira grudgingly agrees. As Craig returns to the Embassy, Ferreira telephones to say that Rogov committed suicide in the prison hospital, but that the PIDE had collected useful evidence from his belongings and could still shut down the local revolutionary group.

Craig arranges for Amanda to be debriefed at length by MI5 on her return, hoping that the experience will make her realise the seriousness of her actions. The novel ends with a letter from Amanda to Craig, where she writes that she has been deceiving her interrogator and teasing him that she will infiltrate the British intelligence services.

== Characters in "Sole Agent" ==
- Peter Craig – protagonist; international police advisor for Her Majesty's Government
- Roderick Harcourt – Defence Attaché, British Embassy in Lisbon
- Amanda Harcourt – socialite, Roderick's daughter
- Milo Janek/Rogov – Russian GRU agent
- Joao Goncalves Costa – playboy and revolutionary
- Vicente Ferreira – Sub-Director of PIDE
