= Heist Society =

2010 novel by Ally Carter

- The Cover Image for Heist Society
- Author: Ally Carter
- Language: English
- Series: Heist Society
- Genre: Realistic Fiction/Mystery
- Publisher: Disney Hyperion
- Publication date: February 9, 2010
- Publication place: United States
- Media type: Print (hardcover)
- Pages: 304
- ISBN: 978-1-4231-1639-4
- OCLC: 422768152
- Followed by: Uncommon Criminals

Heist Society is the sixth novel by author Ally Carter, and was published on February 9, 2010. This is her fourth novel for young adults, and her first young adult novel outside of her The New York Times bestselling Gallagher Girls series. The cover was released on October 21, 2009. Following on from the trend begun with her previous novel, Don't Judge A Girl By Her Cover, Carter has been posting mini excerpts of the book on her blog and Twitter. Heist Society was optioned for film by Warner Bros. The studio planned to age the characters from their teens to their twenties. Its sequel, Uncommon Criminals, was released June 21, 2011. The third book to the series Perfect Scoundrels was released on February 5, 2013.

== Summary ==
Tired of her lifelong involvement in her family's business of stealing, teenage thief Katarina Bishop enrolls herself in a prestigious boarding school. Then after a mere three months there, her friend, 16-year-old billionaire W.W Hale V, arranges for her expulsion. After escorting her home, he informs her that five paintings have been stolen from the menacing Arturo Taccone and that her father is the prime suspect. Determined to save him by locating the real thief and stealing the paintings back, Kat gathers a team of larcenous friends to pull off the heist before the two-week deadline, only to discover that the works were stolen by world-renowned Visily Romani, a thief famous for reclaiming Nazi-spoils. By planning the theft of the Henley, a museum in London, well known for its security, and by remaining one step ahead of Interpol and the mobster on her tail, Kat negotiates complicated relationships in this action-packed heist story.

== Film adaptation ==
According to The Hollywood Reporter, Drew Barrymore will team up with Warner Bros. to produce—and probably direct—the book-to-big screen adaptation of "Heist Society". 'Barrymore joins Denise Di Novi and Di Novi Pictures' Alison Greenspan as producers on the project, which Warners won last year in a multi-studio bidding war for the novel by Ally Carter. Screenwriter Shauna Cross is set to adapt.' However, the rights expired, and now Elizabeth Banks' studio Brownstone is set to produce, and Lionsgate are in talks to distribute the film.

Preceded by None	Heist Society Series; Book 1	Succeeded by Uncommon Criminals
