= Twenty-fourth Level =

Book by Kenneth Benton

- Author: Kenneth Benton
- Language: English
- Genre: Spy novel
- Published: 1969 (1st ed.) WM Collins; 2011 (3rd ed.)
- Publication place: United Kingdom
- Media type: Print (Hardcover and Paperback); Digital (ebook)
- ISBN: 978-0002318129 (first edition, hardback)

Twenty-fourth Level is a mystery novel by Kenneth Benton set in Brazil in the 1960s.

== Plot summary ==
Overseas Police Adviser Peter Craig interviews a Rio, Brazil diamond dealer to investigate the source of unusual stone samples that have appeared at the International Diamond Institute in London. In the course of a social engagement, Craig encounters and quarrels with Graben, a violent and corrupt engineer that he arrested while working in West Africa. Graben is accompanied by the Alcidia.

That evening, Craig survives an assassination attempt. When the police are called, they reveal that the diamond dealer has been murdered. The police agree to question Graben, who has disappeared. The investigation leads into a nearby favela, then to a gold mine near Belo Horizonte, which is owned by Alcidia's father. Alcidia and Craig meet at the mine's Casa Grande, and discover they are attracted to one another. Alcidia instructs Craig on how best to infiltrate the mine.

Exploring the mine, Craig discovers a cache of diamonds on the mine's lowest level and realises that Graben has been covertly mining the stones, while buying stock in the mining company with the proceeds. Graben arrives with a Brazilian capoeirista henchman, Jair, and a captive Alcidia, and locks Alcidia and Craig in a mineshaft. The pair manage to alert the mineworkers, just before losing consciousness from the mine's extreme heat, and are treated at the mine's hospital. Craig escapes the hospital and confronts Graben and Jair. Craig convinces Jair that Graben has been deceiving him, and Jair kills Graben then attacks Craig. Craig manages to kill Jair and returns to the mine hospital with letters that prove Graben's guilt.

Craig wakes up to discover that de Sa has taken his evidence against Graben and is covering up the murders to draw attention away from Alcidia and Craig, but insists Craig leaves the country. Craig and Alcidia arrange to meet in London, but the novel ends on a sour note as both realise their romance will have to end before it has begun.

== Characters in "Twenty-fourth Level" ==
- Peter Craig – protagonist; international police advisor for Her Majesty's Government
- Moacyr Lima de Sa – Brazilian gold mine owner
- Alcidia de Sa – his daughter
- Colonel Pessoa – Guanabara State police chief
- Horst Graben – mine engineer
