= Matthew Dunn (author) =

British spy novelist

Matthew Howard Dunn (born 25 November 1968) is a British spy novelist, creative adviser, and former MI6 intelligence officer. According to his publicists his time in the intelligence services included experience with specialized units of the British SAS, including 'the Increment' and SBS as well as joint operations with MI5, GCHQ, the CIA, and BND.

== Biography ==
He read politics and economics at the University of East Anglia.

Dunn was the recipient of a personal commendation from the foreign secretary for his actions on an operation, which was deemed so significant that it directly influenced the success of a major international incident.

== Works ==
=== Novels ===
- Spycatcher (2011), William Morrow
- Sentinel: A Spycatcher Novel (2012), William Morrow
- Slingshot: A Spycatcher Novel (2013), William Morrow
- Counter Spy: A Spycatcher Novella (2014), William Morrow
- Dark Spies: A Spycatcher Novel (2014), William Morrow
- Spy Trade: A Spycatcher Novella (2015), William Morrow
- The Spy House: A Spycatcher Novel (2015), William Morrow
- A Soldier's Revenge: A Spycatcher Novel (2016), William Morrow
- Act of Betrayal: A Spycatcher Novel (2017), William Morrow
- The Spy Whisperer: A Ben Sign Novel (2018), Independent
- The Russian Doll: A Ben Sign Novel (2018), Independent
- The Fifth Man: A Ben Sign Novel (2019), Independent
- The Kill House: A Ben Sign Novella (2019), Amazon
- The Spy Thief: A Ben Sign Novel (2021), Amazon
