= All Fall Down (Carter novel) =

2015 novel by Ally Carter

- Author: Ally Carter
- Series: Embassy Row
- Genre: Young adult fiction
- Publisher: Scholastic Australia
- Publication date: 2015
- Pages: 320
- ISBN: 978-0545654746
- OCLC: 892793515
- Followed by: See How They Run
- Website: http://allycarter.com/books/all-fall-down/synopsis/

All Fall Down (2015) is a young adult novel by teen-fiction author Ally Carter. It is the first book in the Embassy Row series set in and around the diplomatic quarter of a Mediterranean capital city. The concept for the book was in the making from 2007, but only began being written in 2013. The second book of the series, See How They Run, was released on December 22, 2015. The third, and final book in the series, Take The Key And Lock Her Up, was released at the end of December, 2016; with some regions getting it in January, 2017.

== Plot ==
Grace Blakely is a sixteen-year-old American who grew up between her native country and the fictional Mediterranean nation of Adria, located in the Balkan Peninsula, which she has roots in. Grace's mother Caroline was killed in what she believes was a murder, but is told by her family was a fire. Grace remembers the face of a man with a large scar who was on the scene of Caroline's death, and believes he was responsible for the murder.

Grace's father sends her to return to Adria to live in an American embassy with her grandfather, the ambassador. She immediately takes a disliking to the embassy and Ms Chancellor, a senior woman working there. Trying to escape the embassy, she briefly meets a German girl who scares her into staying inside. She also meets her brother Jamie's old friend, Alexei Volkov, who is the son of a senior Russian embassy worker. She initially does not recognise him but has a flashback of them playing together as young children. She eventually leaves the embassy, where she slips and, in doing so, accidentally punches the Russian ambassador. She is taken to the Russian embassy where she is heavily questioned but eventually let go.

In the night, a boy breaks into her bedroom. He introduces himself as Noah Estaban, a half Israeli and half Brazilian boy residing between the embassies of his two countries. Noah takes Grace to a secret party being held in a cliff owned by the Iranian embassy, which has since been abandoned. Here, she meets the German girl and finds out her name is Rosie, a former gymnast. They immediately become friends and Grace sticks up for Rosie when Noah's twin sister, Lila, bullies her and demands that she leaves. In a fit of anger, Rosie snatches Lila's scarf, but the wind blows it out of her hands and lands on the Iranian flagpole. Grace realises that the scarf bears a striking resemblance to the Israeli flag and Noah immediately calls off the party, scared to cause an international incident. Despite protests from her friends, later that night Grace breaks into the abandoned Iranian embassy to retrieve the scarf but overhears two men meeting in secret. When she sees one of them, she believes him to be the scarred man who murdered her mother.

She learns soon after that she is due to be attending a royal ball as her grandfather's date. She immediately refuses but becomes more open to the idea after Ms Chancellor gets Noah and her old friend Megan to help her prepare. On the night of the ball, Grace briefly talks to Alexei before he disappears up a staircase. Grace tries to follow him but runs into the Scarred Man and becomes too scared to continue searching for Alexei. Noah eventually makes Grace go home. When she arrives at Embassy Row, she sees Alexei and has a panic attack, forcing him to carry her to bed.

Several days later, Grace, Noah, Rosie and Megan break into the Scarred Man's house, where Megan documents the footage. They go to the Iranian embassy to watch it over. Whilst looking for the Scarred Man on her computer, Megan and Noah discover several scarred men, all of whom Grace has accused of killing her mother. Noah is furious and believes that she has been lying to him the entire time.

Grace sees her grandfather chatting to the Scarred Man and immediately confronts him. Her grandfather says that his name is Dominic Novak and that he is an agent for the Prime Minister, and that there is no way that he could have killed her mother. At the G20 summit, which is due to be held in Adria, she believes that someone is going to assassinate the Prime Minister, but learns instead that Dominic was actually a friend of her mother's. He takes her into the tunnels under the city, where they run into the Prime Minister. Dominic tries to persuade Grace to run away, but Ms Chancellor shoots the Prime Minister in the chest, sending him into a coma.

Ms Chancellor shows Grace a picture of Dominic with her mother taken three days before her death, noting that he does not have the scar. Grace realises that she herself is her mother's killer - she fired a gun at Dominic who she believed to be attempting to kill her mother but was actually staging her death by setting fire to the jewelry store she was in at the time. Caroline, trying to save her friend, took every bullet and died. She also learns that Alexei has been sent back to Moscow by his father.

The book ends with Ms Chancellor taking Grace into a different section of the tunnel run by a secret society of women that Grace's mother was a part of.

== Reception ==
Common Sense Media in reviewing All Fall Down wrote "This may not be high literature, but tweens and teens may get hooked on the series." A review by the Ottawa Public Library gave the book 4 out of 5 stars. and AudioFile called an audiobook version "A twisty listen sure to engage teen listeners."
