= The Faithful Spy =

2006 novel by Alex Berenson

- Author: Alex Berenson
- Language: English
- Series: John Wells
- Subject: Terrorism
- Genre: Spy Fiction
- Publisher: Random House
- Publication date: April 25, 2006
- Publication place: United States
- Media type: Print (Hardback and Paperback)
- Pages: 334pg (Hardcover)
- ISBN: 978-0-345-47899-3
- OCLC: 61758037
- Dewey Decimal: 813'6--dc22
- LC Class: PS3602.E75146 F35 2006
- Followed by: The Ghost War

The Faithful Spy is a novel by The New York Times reporter Alex Berenson. The novel won an Edgar Allan Poe Award for Best First Novel. It was published in 2006 by Random House and tells the story of a CIA agent who has infiltrated al-Qaeda and, years after 9/11, struggles to stop a terrorist attack in the United States.

== Plot ==
The book begins a few months after the September 11th terrorist attacks on the United States, with John Wells, an undercover CIA agent, in the middle of a battle in Afghanistan. Wells has been undercover with Al Qaeda for many years, fighting in Chechnya, Afghanistan and Pakistan. During the battle he and his crew of Al-Qaeda members are on a hillside where a group of United States Marines are stationed. The small Al-Qaeda band is planning to attack the Marines to help with a bigger battle that is raging below, and Wells decides to take out the terrorists himself so he can send a message to his CIA contact via the Marines: "No prior knowledge of 9/11. Say hi to Heather for me."

Meanwhile, back in the United States, Jennifer Exley, his CIA handler, visits a prisoner of war being held on a Navy ship to try to get information on Wells, who has been incommunicado for two years.

Al Qaeda detonates two truck bombs in LA, killing hundreds of people. John Wells is returned to the USA on a mission from Al Qaeda where he reconnects with the CIA. However, due to the length of his absence he is accused of being “un-faithful” because he did not warn the US about Al Qaeda attacks. The accuser, Vinny Duto, forces John to take a polygraph test. He proves himself to be innocent. Wells is put in a CIA safe house in Washington, DC but escapes in order to continue his Al Qaeda mission.

He heads to Atlanta and spends several months hiding out before being given the task of killing a retired US Army general. After completing this task, and secretly killing his two fellow Al Qaeda members, he is given the task of collecting something from Canada. While in Canada, he meets with an Al-Qaeda member to collect a suitcase, really a scientist who has been working to grow the plague bacteria. Wells returns with the suitcase but has secretly been infected with the plague by the scientist. Wells then learns that Al Qaeda used the LA bombings as a distraction from an impending, much larger attack; several other Al Qaeda members have infected themselves with the plague and plan to spread it throughout the population, creating a pandemic within the United States. Wells, with the help of Exley, is able to kill the infected terrorists and take out their leader, Khadri, thwarting their plans.

== Characters ==
- John Wells
- Jennifer Exley
- Vinny Duto
- Omar Khadri
- Shafer-
