= The Tourist (novel) =

2009 espionage novel by Olen Steinhauer

- First edition
- Author: Olen Steinhauer
- Language: English
- Genre: Espionage
- Publisher: Minotaur Books
- Publication date: 2009
- Media type: Hardcover and paperback
- Pages: 408
- ISBN: 0-312-37487-9
- Followed by: The Nearest Exit

The Tourist is a 2009 espionage novel written by Olen Steinhauer, that was featured on The New York Times' list of best sellers.

== Story ==
The story follows Milo Weaver, an agent with a secret branch of the CIA specializing in black ops known as the Tourists.

== Film adaptation ==
George Clooney's production company reportedly purchased the film rights to the novel in March 2009. It was rumored that Clooney intended to play the role of Weaver. In September 2012, it was reported that Columbia Pictures would adapt the novel into a film with Doug Liman set to direct. In October 2023, it was reported that 20th Century Studios would adapt the novel into a film with Pablo Trapero set to direct.
