= Tell Your Children: The Truth About Marijuana, Mental Illness and Violence =

2019 book by Alex Berenson

- First edition
- Author: Alex Berenson
- Language: English
- Subject: Cannabis, psychosis, violence
- Publisher: Free Press
- Publication date: January 8, 2019
- Publication place: United States
- ISBN: 978-1-9821-0366-8

Tell Your Children: The Truth About Marijuana, Mental Illness and Violence is a 2019 book by Alex Berenson. In it, Berenson makes claims that cannabis use directly causes psychosis and violence, claims denounced as alarmist and inaccurate by many in the scientific and medical communities. Scientists state that Berenson is drawing inappropriate conclusions from the research he cites, primarily by inferring causation from correlation, as well as cherry picking data that fits his narrative, and falling victim to selection bias via his use of anecdotes to back up his assertions.

The title "Tell Your Children" was also the original title for Reefer Madness, a 1936 American propaganda film which gained cult popularity in the 1970s for its alarmist claims about cannabis. In an interview, Berenson said he made this choice deliberately: "I expected I would face serious backlash for this book and instead of running from it I decided to lean in."

== Criticism ==
In January 2019, Berenson published the book and an accompanying op-ed in both The Wall Street Journal and The New York Times, in which he claims that use of cannabis causes psychosis and violence.

Berenson's portrayal of scientific and medical evidence has been widely panned as inaccurate and alarmist by scientists and medical experts, who have described his arguments as "based on a deeply inaccurate misreading of science" and an attempt to stir up public fear.

A group of 100 scholars and clinicians (including academics from Columbia University, Harvard Medical School, and New York University, and care providers including addiction medicine doctors, psychologists, psychiatrists and social workers) published an open letter criticizing Berenson's claim of a scientific link between cannabis use and violence. In particular, they describe his book as highly problematic because Berenson infers causation from correlation, cherry-picks data that fits his narrative, falls victim to selection bias via use of anecdotes to back up his assertions, and attributes the disproportionate rates of arrest of African-American youth to the alleged violence caused by their cannabis use, despite individuals of all races using cannabis at approximately equal rates.

Berenson responded to questions about the letter, arguing that its signatories were not experts and that there was an insufficient number of medical doctors that had signed on to validate any criticisms of his book laid out in the letter.

Ziva Cooper, a cannabis researcher at UCLA who was involved in conducting a study heavily referenced by Berenson, disputed Berenson's determination that the study "declared the issue [that cannabis causes violence and psychosis] settled" by tweeting that the study only found a correlation, and not a causation, as Berenson had claimed in his publications, between cannabis use and schizophrenia. She also stated that studies that have been conducted since hers was completed seem to imply that a genetic link predicts both cannabis use and schizophrenia, and that the direction of causality is from genetics to schizophrenia and cannabis use, not from cannabis use by itself to schizophrenia; as well as that cannabidiol (a component of cannabis) improves symptoms of schizophrenia.

Carl Hart, a professor of psychology and psychiatry at Columbia University and Charles Ksir, professor emeritus of psychology and neuroscience at the University of Wyoming, wrote an opinion piece in The Guardian which stated: "As scientists with a combined 70-plus years of drug education and research on psychoactive substances, we find Berenson's assertions to be misinformed and reckless." Hart and Ksir added that Berenson confuses causation with correlation (association) when claiming that cannabis use causes increased psychosis, while ignoring that the same correlation also exists for psychosis and use of tobacco, stimulants, and opioids. They concluded: "Back in the 1930s, when there were virtually no scientific data on marijuana, ignorant and racist officials publicized exaggerated anecdotal accounts of its harms and were believed. Almost 90 years and hundreds of studies later, there is no excuse for these exaggerations or the inappropriate conclusions drawn by Berenson. Neither account has any place in serious discussions of science or public policy – which means Berenson doesn't, either."

In regards to Berenson noting that the murder rate in Washington state increased around the time that cannabis was legalized, Yasmin Hurd, the director of the Addiction Institute at Mount Sinai School of Medicine, stated "There is nothing to support that marijuana legalization has increased murder rates...schizophrenic people are not the ones committing murders. Trying to put a mental-health disorder as the explanation for murder rates—that is incorrect and should not have a platform."

In an article in The Nation, the author notes that Berenson seems to fail to understand or admit that cannabis contains both THC and CBD (which has been approved by the FDA in the form of Epidiolex to treat some kinds of epilepsy), and that medical marijuana products generally contain low THC and high CBD. Additionally, Berenson implies that American scientists did little cannabis research because they did not think it had any value, while ignoring the fact that the Schedule I federal legal classification for cannabis (which puts it in the same category as heroin and LSD) makes it extremely difficult for US scientists research it.

An article in Rolling Stone about the book concludes with "[Berenson] is correct in saying that marijuana businesses and advocates often distort reality and research to fit their claims. Here's the thing though. You know who else is driven by profits to stretch the truth? Someone trying to sell copies of his book."

In spite of the above, Berenson continues to claim "Cannabis causes psychosis causes violence" and tweets anecdotes of crimes committed by persons who have recently used cannabis.

== See also ==
- List of books about cannabis
