= Kenneth Benton =

English MI6 officer and diplomat

- Born: Kenneth Carter Benton; 4 March 1909; Wolverhampton, England
- Died: 14 October 1999 (aged 90); Chichester, England
- Occupations: Author, Intelligence officer
- Notable work: Sole Agent, Twenty-fourth Level, Spy in Chancery
- Style: Spy fiction, Crime fiction, historical fiction
- Spouse: Peggie Lambert
- Awards: CMG

Kenneth Carter Benton, CMG (4 March 1909 – 14 October 1999) was an English MI6 officer and diplomat from 1937–68. Following retirement, Benton began a second career as writer of spy and crime thrillers.

== Early life and education ==
Benton attended Wolverhampton School, and was first employed teaching French in an English prep school, then teaching English in Florence and Vienna. During this time, he earned a degree in French, German and Italian as an external student at London University.

== 1937–41: Recruitment to MI6 and first postings ==
In 1937, in Vienna, Benton was offered a job by Captain Thomas Kendrick, the British Passport Control Officer for Vienna, who he had met initially through his future wife, Peggie Lambert. He was subsequently interviewed by Maurice Jeffes and Admiral Hugh Sinclair, then chief of MI6. Benton quickly realised that his role in the Passport Control Office was in fact a cover for intelligence work for MI6.

"I had expected to begin dealing with visas, but instead was brought in to one of the back rooms where Bill Holmes passed me a letter addressed to somebody with a Czech name in some street in Vienna and asked me to translate it. I opened the letter, called Bill, and said, 'Look, I can't do this; it is in Czech.' She said, 'Oh, I'm sorry; how stupid; hang on for a moment.' At the back of my desk there was a little open bottle of colourless liquid, with a brush, and she dipped the brush in the liquid, passed it over the whole of the front of the letter and to my amazed eyes red writing appeared at right angles to the Czech text and it was in German. Then she turned the letter over and did the same on the rear side, so that I had two sides of what was in fact a German report."

After the Annexation of Austria in 1938, Kenneth and Peggie (married in March of that year) were posted to Riga, he as acting vice consul; after the Soviet occupation of Latvia two years later, he returned to England and after briefing at Bletchley Park was subsequently posted to Madrid as head of MI6's Section V, dealing with intercepted intelligence traffic and identifying German spies travelling through Spain.

== 1941–43: Madrid ==
Benton reported technically to Hamilton Stokes, Head of the Madrid SIS Station, but because of the confidential nature of his decoding work, he was not allowed to discuss ISOS traffic. This situation created friction between the two men, and Benton was eventually appointed head of a separate station, named 'Iberia'. The cover that the Visa office provided allowed Benton and his wife to create a database of information on individuals leaving and entering Spain, which could be compiled with other intelligence reports to identify patterns.

"The card index, in the course of nearly three years when I was in charge, grew to fourteen feet in length and really appeared to have a life of its own, because it often produced information that we did not know it had. Into that card index went the names of visa applicants, lists of ship passengers, names of known agents, Abwehr officers, guests at hotels, passengers on air flights, passengers on trains, as well as individuals about whom we had received information from Head Office or locally."

Benton's team identified 19 spies during his time in Madrid, including the Double Cross agents TREASURE, ARTIST, TRICYCLE and GARBO.

"what we wanted to do was to get them to England and turn them into double agents, not just to satisfy the Germans that they were getting a lot of spies into England, but of course for the great deception which was so effective in deceiving the Germans on D-Day [...] the great advantage of the ISOS double agents was that, as soon as the false messages had been sent to the German case officers, we knew by their reactions how they had been accepted, which was an enormous advantage."

=== Kim Philby ===
In 1941, Kim Philby was appointed head of the Iberian section, which dealt with both Spain and Portugal, and became Benton's boss. He later articulated the emotional effect of Philby's outing as a Soviet agent in 1963:

"Philby betrayed us all [...] He had no loyalties, either to HMG or friends, or to the women he married. We had liked and admired him and were left feeling unclean."

His sentiments were shared by his wife:

"Years later, when Philby made his escape to Moscow, Peggie and I were having a drink with Footman, who was looking shattered. 'I know', said Peggie. 'We could work out a plan to leak information to the NKVD showing that Philby was a triple-cross, that Nicholas Eliot's last meeting with him in Beirut had really been to brief him on how to make touch with our Embassy in Moscow. I'll bet they'd swallow the story, if we did it craftily.' 'But the NKVD would shoot him', protested David, shocked to the core. 'Yes', said Peggie happily, 'and serve him bloody right.'"

== 1943 onwards ==
Shortly after the Allied invasion of Italy in September 1943, Kenneth and Peggie were posted to Rome; Kenneth had been appointed head of the MI6 station attached to the new British Embassy, which as a result of rationing and ongoing disruption in Italy, was only opened in July 1944. Benton's later career included a further posting to Madrid in 1953, then to London from 1956–62 as head of recruitment for SIS. He was subsequently posted to Lima, Peru and Rio de Janeiro, Brazil, as Deputy Director for Latin America (DDLA), and retired from the Service in 1968.

== Post-MI6 ==
Following retirement to Appledore, Kent, then to Chichester, West Sussex, Kenneth began a second career as a writer of spy, crime thrillers, and historical fiction, drawing on his experiences as intelligence officer and diplomat, and his extensive travels. He became president of the Crime Writers' Association in 1974-5, succeeding Dick Francis.

== Fiction ==
Benton published 11 novels across several genres, two of which were published under the pseudonym James Kirton. Those perhaps closest to his experiences in MI6, "though avoiding anything which could compromise or damage his former Service" are the six titles featuring a recurring hero, the police advisor and Counter-terrorism expert Peter Craig.

== Bibliography ==
| Title | Year | Publisher |
|---|---|---|
| Twenty-fourth Level | 1969 | WM Collins |
| Sole Agent | 1970 | WM Collins |
| Spy in Chancery | 1972 | WM Collins |
| Craig and the Jaguar | 1973 | Macmillan |
| Craig and the Tunisian Tangle | 1974 | Macmillan |
| Death on the Appian Way | 1974 | Chatto & Windus |
| Craig and the Midas Touch | 1975 | Macmillan |
| The Red Hen Conspiracy | 1982 | Macmillan |
| A Single Monstrous Act | 1982 | Macmillan |
| Time for Murder | 1985 | Robert Hale |
| Ward of Caesar | 1985 | Robert Hale |
| Greek Fire | 1985 | Robert Hale |
