= Olen Steinhauer =

American novelist

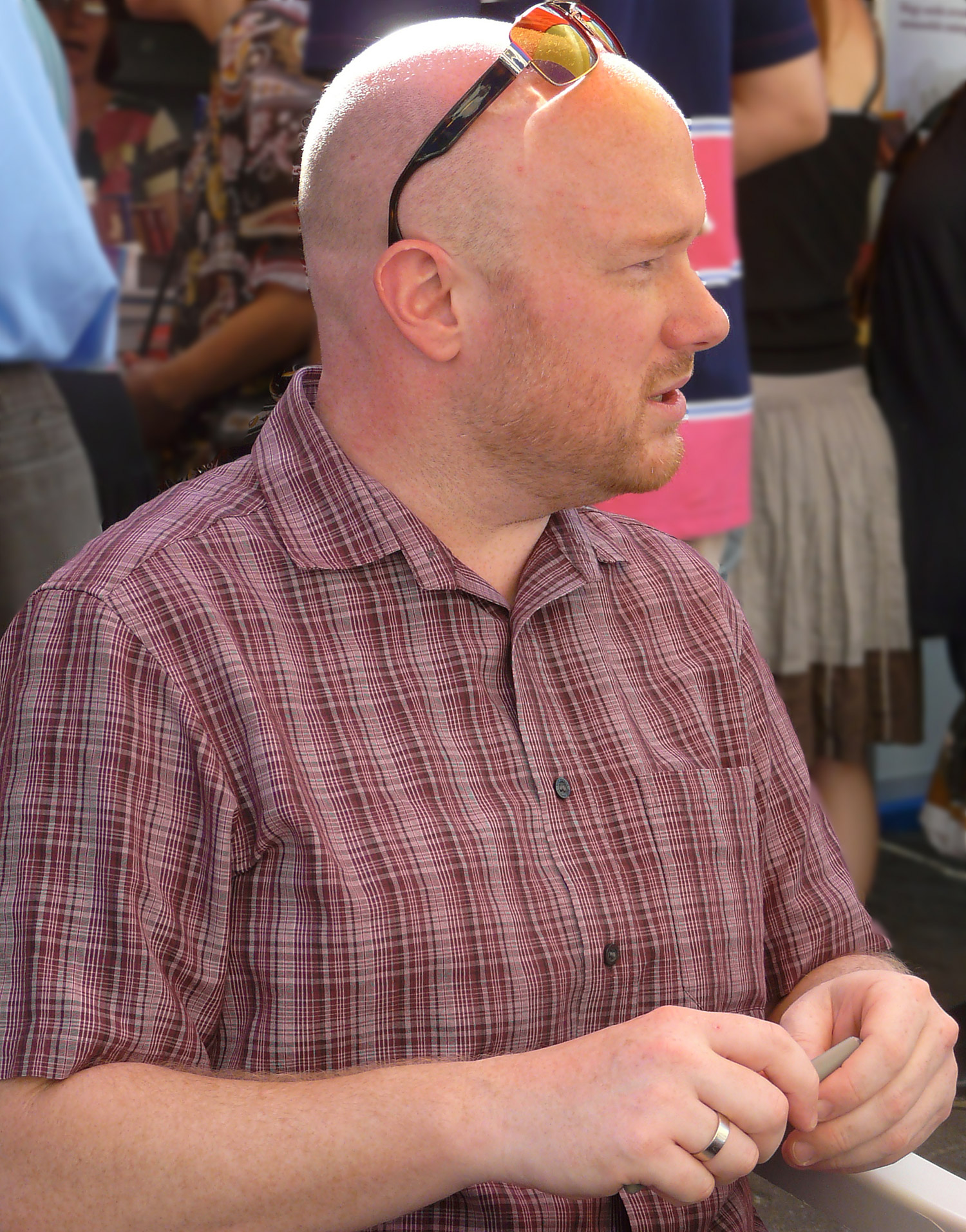
- Steinhauer at the Budapest Literary Festival in Hungary, June 2010
- Born: June 21, 1970 (age 56); Baltimore, Maryland, U.S.
- Education: Emerson College
- Occupation: Novelist
- Writing career
- Genre: Spy fiction
- Website: www.olensteinhauer.com

Olen Steinhauer (born June 21, 1970 in Baltimore) is an American writer of spy fiction novels, including The Tourist, part of the Milo Weaver series, and the Yalta Boulevard Sequence. Steinhauer also created the TV series Berlin Station, focused on a fictional Central Intelligence Agency branch operating in Berlin, which began airing in 2016.

== Early life ==
On June 21, 1970, Steinhauer was born in Baltimore, Maryland, United States. Steinhauer grew up in Virginia.

== Education ==
Steinhauer attended university at Lock Haven University of Pennsylvania, and the University of Texas, Austin, graduating in 1992. In 1999 he received an MFA in creative writing at Emerson College in Boston.

== Career ==
After graduation, Steinhauer received a year-long Fulbright grant to write a novel in Romania about the Romanian Revolution. It was called Tzara's Monocle, and when he moved to New York City afterward, he used that manuscript to secure a literary agent. However, it was with another book, the historical mystery set in Eastern Europe, The Bridge of Sighs, that Steinhauer first found publication.

His 2009 CIA novel, The Tourist, received positive reviews and is being developed for film by Sony Pictures Entertainment for Doug Liman to direct.

During the winter of 2009-10, Steinhauer was the Picador Guest Professor for Literature at the University of Leipzig's Institute for American Studies in Leipzig, Germany.

== Work ==
=== The Yalta Boulevard Sequence ===
The Bridge of Sighs was the first in a five-book series of thrillers chronicling the evolution of a fictional Eastern European country situated in the historical location of Ruthenia (now part of Ukraine) during the Cold War, with one book for each decade. Each book also focuses on a different main character.

- The Bridge of Sighs (2003) — Emil Brod, 1948 (nominated for five awards)
- The Confession (2004) — Ferenc Kolyeszar, 1956
- 36 Yalta Boulevard (2005) — Brano Sev, 1966–1967. Also published as The Vienna Assignment
- Liberation Movements (2006) — Brano Sev, Katja Drdova, Gavra Noukas, 1968 & 1975 (nominated for the Edgar Award for Best Novel). Also published as The Istanbul Variations
- Victory Square (2007) — The final book in the series, dealing with 1989, the end of communism, and the return to the main character of the first book, Emil Brod.

=== The Milo Weaver Series ===
- The Tourist (2009) — The first in a series of espionage novels focused on a central character, Milo Weaver.
- The Nearest Exit (2010)
- An American Spy (2012)
- The Last Tourist (2020)

=== Standalone novels ===
- The Cairo Affair (2014)
- All the Old Knives (2015)
- The Middleman (2018)

== Related reading ==
- Robert Lance Snyder, "'Floating Unmoored': The World of 'Tourism' in Olen Steinhauer's Espionage Trilogy," Clues: A Journal of Detection 38.1 (Spring 2020): 9-18.
