= Alex Berenson =

American writer (born 1973)

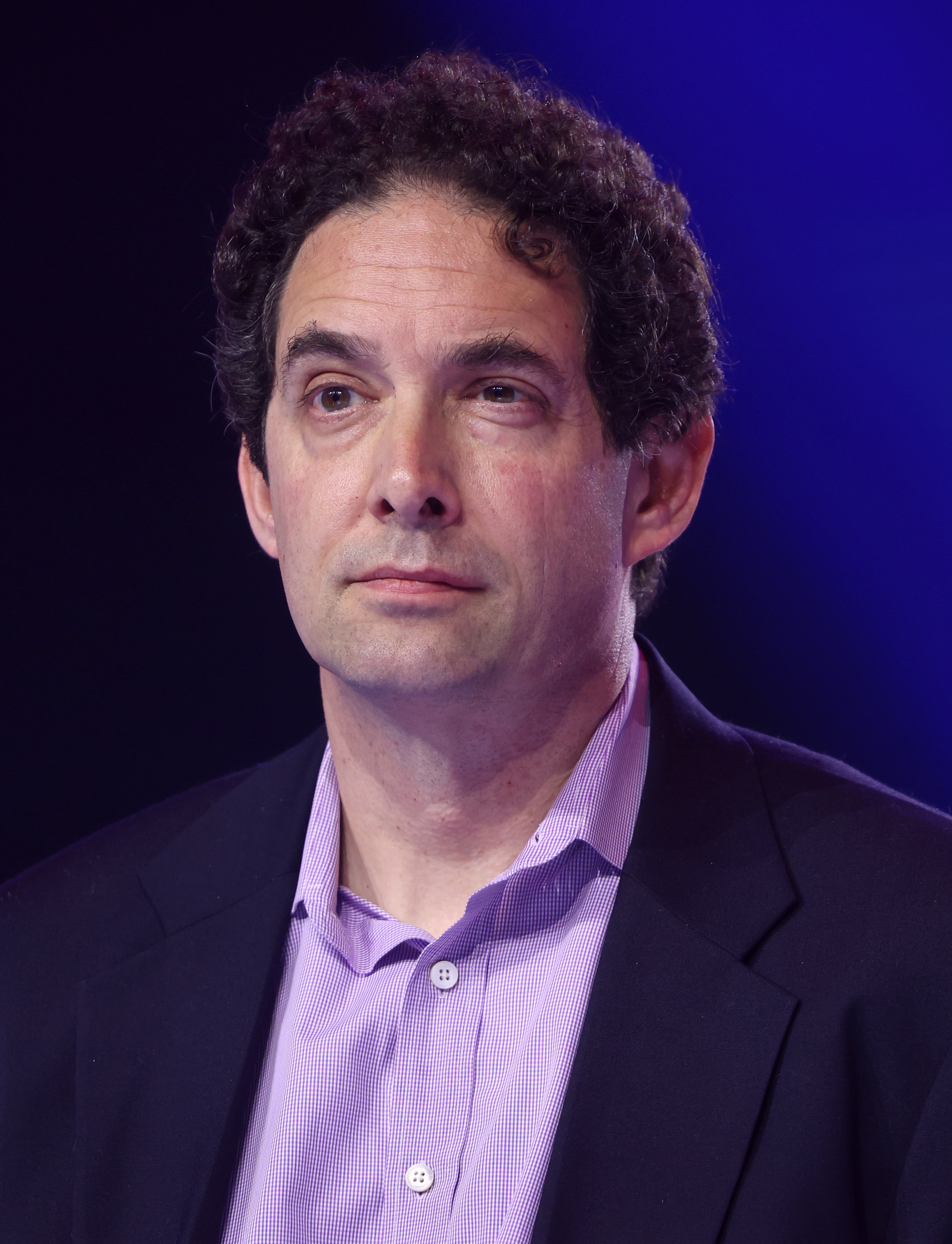
- Berenson in 2025
- Born: Alex Norman Berenson; January 6, 1973 (age 53); New York, U.S.
- Education: Yale University (BA)
- Spouse: Jacqueline Anne Basha (m. 2009)
- Writing career
- Genres: Nonfiction, spy fiction
- Subject: Politics
- Notable awards: Edgar Award (2007)
- Website: Official website

Alex Norman Berenson (born January 6, 1973) is an American writer who was a reporter for The New York Times, and has authored several thriller novels as well a book on corporate financial filings. His 2019 book Tell Your Children: The Truth About Marijuana, Mental Illness and Violence sparked controversy, earning denunciations from many in the scientific and medical communities.

During the coronavirus pandemic, Berenson appeared frequently in American right-wing media, spreading false claims about COVID-19 and its vaccines. He spent much of the pandemic arguing that its seriousness was overblown. Once the COVID-19 vaccines became available, he spread misinformation about the safety and effectiveness of the vaccines.

== Early life and education ==
Berenson was born in New York, and grew up in Englewood, New Jersey. After attending the Horace Mann School, he graduated from Yale University in 1994 with bachelor's degrees in history and economics.

== Career ==
Berenson joined The Denver Post in June 1994 as a business reporter. In August 1996, he left the Post to join TheStreet, a financial news website founded by Jim Cramer. In December 1999, Berenson joined The New York Times as a business investigative reporter.

In the fall of 2003 and the summer of 2004, Berenson covered the occupation of Iraq for the Times. He then covered the pharmaceutical and health care industries, specializing in issues concerning dangerous drugs. Beginning in December 2008, Berenson reported on the Bernard Madoff $50 billion Ponzi scheme scandal.

In 2010, Berenson left the Times to become a full-time novelist.

He has written 12 spy novels, all featuring the same protagonist, CIA agent John Wells. His first novel, The Faithful Spy, was released in April 2006 and won an Edgar Award for best debut by an American novelist. The Faithful Spy was ranked #1 on The New York Times Bestseller List for paperbacks.

In 2008, Berenson released his second thriller, The Ghost War. His third novel, The Silent Man, followed in 2009. His fourth, The Midnight House, was released in 2010 and debuted at #9 on The New York Times bestseller list. The fifth, The Secret Soldier, was released in 2011 and debuted at #6 on the bestseller list. The sixth, The Shadow Patrol, was released in 2012, and debuted at #8. In July 2012, The Shadow Patrol was named a finalist for the Ian Fleming Steel Dagger Award, given by Britain's Crime Writers' Association.

=== Opposition to cannabis legalization ===
In 2019, Berenson authored the book Tell Your Children: The Truth About Marijuana, Mental Illness and Violence, which argues that marijuana use contributes to psychotic disorders and violent crime. The book "received positive coverage from The New Yorker and Mother Jones for what some called its troubling truths" but was denounced as alarmist and inaccurate in the scientific and medical communities because of his claims that cannabis causes psychosis and violence; many scientists state that he is drawing inappropriate conclusions from the research, primarily by inferring causation from correlation, as well as cherry picking data that fits his narrative, and falling victim to selection bias via his use of anecdotes to back up his assertions.

=== COVID-19 pandemic ===
Early in the 2020 COVID-19 pandemic, Berenson vocally argued that people and the media were overestimating the risk of the new virus, that it posed little risk to young Americans, and that it was being used as a cover for government overreach. Many public health experts have rejected his claims.

In May 2020, Fox News announced that Berenson would host a TV show called COVID Contrarian on its online streaming platform Fox Nation. However, by July 2020, amid surges in coronavirus cases across parts of the United States, Fox News appeared to have backtracked and removed the announcement of his show from its website.

In 2021, Berenson tweeted that COVID-19 vaccinations had led to 50 times more adverse effects than the flu vaccine. PolitiFact rated the claim "mostly false". The Atlantic called him "The pandemic's wrongest man", owing to what they termed his "dangerously, unflaggingly, and superlatively wrong" claims of the vaccine's ineffectiveness.

On January 25, 2022, Berenson appeared on the Fox News show Tucker Carlson Tonight declaring that existing mRNA vaccines are "dangerous and ineffective" against COVID-19, and further demanding that they be withdrawn from the market immediately. The Washington Post's Philip Bump denounced Carlson for "inviting Berenson on, despite his proven track record of misinformation and cherry-picking" and observed that "Berenson's claims went unchallenged."

==== Twitter suspension and reinstatement ====
On August 28, 2021, Twitter permanently suspended Berenson for repeated violations of its policy on COVID-19 misinformation, but after he filed suit in December 2021 demanding reinstatement, Twitter reinstated his account in early summer 2022, in a "mutually acceptable resolution". This reinstatement was referred to as "significant" by The Atlantic, given that most social-media-banned people fail to win their court cases.

Berenson did not regain Twitter access because of a First Amendment free speech claim, which was rejected by the judge. Eric Goldman, a law professor at Santa Clara University School of Law, theorizes that Twitter settled because of documentation of promises made to Berenson by a high-level Twitter employee concerning the nature of his tweets. Goldman stated that Internet company executives have always been advised by their attorneys not to make promises to or even to speak to anyone about their individual accounts "for reasons that should now be obvious".

On April 14, 2023, Berenson filed a lawsuit in a federal district court against President Joe Biden in his official capacity, members of his administration in their individual capacities, and a board member and the CEO of Pfizer alleging that they pressured Twitter to ban him thereby violating his First Amendment protections. On September 29, 2025, U.S. District Judge Jessica G. L. Clarke dismissed Berenson's lawsuit, ruling that he lacked standing to bring his claim. In October 2026, the Second Circuit upheld the lower court ruling and dismissed Berenson's claim against several defendants.

== Personal life ==
Berenson voted for Donald Trump in the 2024 election.

He lives in Garrison, New York, with his wife Jacqueline, a forensic psychiatrist.

== Books ==
=== Novels ===
John Wells series

No.	Title	Publisher	Date	Genre	ISBN
1	The Faithful Spy	Random House	April 25, 2006	Spy fiction	978-0-345-47899-3
2	The Ghost War	Putnam	February 12, 2008	Spy fiction	978-0-399-15453-9
3	The Silent Man	Putnam	February 10, 2009	Spy fiction	978-0-399-15538-3
4	The Midnight House	Putnam	February 10, 2010	Spy fiction	978-0-399-15620-5
5	The Secret Soldier	Putnam	February 8, 2011	Spy fiction	978-0-399-15708-0
6	The Shadow Patrol	Putnam	February 21, 2012	Spy fiction	978-0-399-15829-2
7	The Night Ranger	Putnam	February 12, 2013	Spy fiction	978-0-399-15972-5
8	The Counterfeit Agent	Putnam	February 11, 2014	Spy fiction	978-0-399-15973-2
9	Twelve Days	Putnam	February 10, 2015	Spy fiction	978-0-399-15974-9
10	The Wolves	Putnam	February 9, 2016	Spy fiction	978-0-399-17614-2
11	The Prisoner	Putnam	January 31, 2017	Spy fiction	978-0-399-17615-9
12	The Deceivers	Putnam	February 6, 2018	Spy fiction	978-0-698-40753-4

Standalone Novels

- The Power Couple. Simon & Schuster. February 9, 2021. ISBN 978-1-9821-0369-9.

=== Non-fiction ===
- The Number: How the Drive for Quarterly Earnings Corrupted Wall Street and Corporate America. New York: Random House. 2003. ISBN 9780375508806. OCLC 51022970.
- Lost in Kandahar (audio narrative performed by the author) Brilliance Audio, 2012, ISBN 978-1469230948 OCLC 857738857
- Tell Your Children: The Truth About Marijuana, Mental Illness and Violence, 2019, Free Press, ISBN 978-1982103668
- Pandemia: How Coronavirus Hysteria Took Over Our Government, Rights, and Lives. Regnery Publishing. 2021. ISBN 9781684512485.

== Awards ==
- 2007 Edgar Award for best first novel, for The Faithful Spy
