= Jonathan de Shalit =

Pseudonymous novelist

Jonathan de Shalit (Hebrew: יונתן דה שליט) is the pen name of an author of espionage thrillers described as “former high-ranking member of the Israeli intelligence community.”

de Shalit's books are reviewed by a committee of the government of Israel before publication, to be certain no information that could put intelligence operatives at risk is revealed. The novels are written in Hebrew and have been translated into English.

== Books ==
=== Traitor ===
Traitor (2018), "a breakneck hunt for a Russian mole in the upper levels of Israel’s power circle," is set in 2012. The reviewer for the Winnipeg Free Press described it as, "a cerebral spy novel far more John le Carré than Jason Bourne.

=== A Spy in Exile ===
A Spy in Exile (2019) is set in 2014–15 in European cities including Moscow, Berlin, Brussels and London.
