= Johnny Fedora =

Fictional British secret agent

Johnny Fedora is a fictional British secret agent who was the protagonist of 16 novels published between 1951 and 1971. Written by Shaun Lloyd McCarthy, under the pseudonym of Desmond Cory, Fedora was dubbed by literary critics as the 'thinking man's James Bond'. Preceding Bond, Fedora was also a hired assassin ("hired to kill"), but for many the Fedora plots were more complex and intellectual. The son of a Spanish father and Irish mother, Fedora was driven as much by a need to avenge the death of his parents (at the hands of Spanish fascists) as by patriotism or loyalty to British Intelligence. He got his start working behind the lines during WWII, assassinating Nazis. The debonair Fedora was always a tough and competent agent, and his first adventures were written in a more light-hearted manner than the latter ones. Like Bond, he had passionate affairs with a wide variety of women around the world (though never as a ruse to gain intelligence), but his relationships tended to be more nuanced, and sometimes spanned several novels. The final books in the series featured his nemesis, Feramontov, a deadly and highly skilled Russian agent, whose ruthlessness went as far as trying to detonate a nuclear bomb in Spain. 1960's The Head, atypical of the series as a whole, featured Johnny, temporarily without any mission from his handlers, getting involved in a publicity stunt for a film that involved carting a massive statue of Jesus to the top of a high Spanish mountain.

== Novels ==
1. Secret Ministry (1951)
2. This Traitor, Death (1952)
3. Dead Man Falling (1953)
4. Intrigue (1954)
5. Height of Day (1955)
6. High Requiem (1956)
7. Johnny Goes North (1956)
8. Johnny Goes East (1958)
9. Johnny Goes West (1959)
10. Johnny Goes South (1959)
11. The Head (1960)
12. Undertow (1962)
13. Hammerhead (1963)
14. Feramontov (1966)
15. Timelock (1967)
16. Sunburst (1971)
