= Only the Good Spy Young =

Novel by Ally Carter

- Author: Ally Carter
- Language: English
- Series: Gallagher Girls
- Subject: Spying
- Genre: Mystery and Wonder
- Publisher: Disney Hyperion
- Publication date: July 29, 2010
- Publication place: United States
- Media type: Print (hardcover)
- Pages: 272
- ISBN: 978-1-4231-2820-5
- Preceded by: Don't Judge a Girl by Her Cover
- Followed by: Out of Sight, Out of Time

Only the Good Spy Young is a 2010 young adult fiction novel by Ally Carter, and the sequel to Don't Judge a Girl by Her Cover. It is the fourth book in the Gallagher Girls series. The book was released on July 29, 2010, but the title had been announced and the cover released on December 25, 2009. Ally Carter posted "mini excerpts" of the book on her website in the lead-up to the release.

== Plot ==
For earlier events, see: Don't Judge a Girl by Her Cover.

The story starts with student Cammie (Cameron Ann Morgan), still enrolled at Gallagher Academy, already in London with Bex (Rebecca Baxter) and her parents (Grace and Abraham Baxter). Cammie now has strict and very serious security surrounding her because the Circle of Cavan, a terrorist group, is after her. While at an ice skating rink, Cammie runs her love interest, Zach, and he asks her if she has seen Joe Solomon. The pair converse somewhat urgently. After Zach leaves, the lights go out, and Cammie is grabbed by Mr. Solomon, who tells her to run. They end up on the Tower Bridge, where Bex's parents reveal that Mr. Solomon was the threat. She demands answers but he only makes her promise to "follow the pigeons" before Joe jumps off the bridge and escapes. Cammie is interrogated two hours later by an MI6 agent, Agent Townsend, and is released. While in a MI6 safe house with Bex's family, Cammie's Aunt, Abby, visits. Cammie is appalled and upset that her mother did not come to comfort her, yet suspicious that Abby is there. After she and Bex eavesdrop on part of the conversation between the Baxters and Aunt Abby (Cammie listening from the dumbwaiter), they confront the adults about their conversation, to which Abby replies, that Joe Solomon has been a member of the Circle of Cavan since he was sixteen. Cammie is dismayed.

The girls return to the Gallagher Academy, but things have changed. All of the secret passageways (except one leading to the kitchen) have been blocked. Security is much higher than before. When the girls reach their room, the MI6 agent from London (Townsend) was there, having left the strong smell of cologne, coffee and footprints on the freshly vacuumed rug. At dinner, Professor Buckingham announces that Agent Townsend would be the new CoveOps teacher, and that Cammie's mother is temporarily detained.

They quickly figure out that Agent Townsend is not interested in teaching at the school, but requested the job to help him find out more about Joe Solomon. They drugged him with an experiment Liz developed (A concoction 10 times stronger than Sodium Pentothal) and interrogated him, and they found out that Mr. Solomon killed Cammie's father. Cammie's mother returned to the school shortly afterward. The roommates decided to try to find out what Mr. Solomon meant by saying "follow the pigeons". They find out there is an old carrier pigeon room, and they go there where they find a message telling Cammie to go to the gazebo. They decide to send Macey instead and discover Zach is the one that sent the message. He asks to see Cammie, and despite Bex's orders to stay where she is, Cammie goes down to see him. He tells her to go the Sublevel 2 and that there is a journal there that will help them understand everything. He also reveals that Mr. Solomon was the one who rigged the alarms in the sublevels so no one could go down.

While the girls try to figure out how to get down to the Sublevels, Cammie is having trouble trusting Zach, despite all they had been through together. Agent Townsend takes them on a "field trip" to an amusement park, and he gives all the girls assignments. Bex is reluctant to let Cammie leave, but Cammie argues that her mother would not have let her come unless it was safe. Cammie proceeds to tail an employee for her assignment. While following him into a building, she finds a rugged, tired-looking Joe Solomon. She first slaps him, making him look frightened, and then she yells at him and tells him he got her father killed, to which he wearily replies, "I know." Agent Townsend shows up with a woman, whom Cammie believes to be the woman from Boston show up and Cammie discovers that it was a plot to capture Joe Solomon. She runs to a hill and finds Zach there. She tells him that she had thought the woman was the woman from Boston and Zach shakes his head and tells her that Joe Solomon would never be with her, then Cammie asks him why Mr. Solomon would walk right into a trap, and he tells her that Mr. Solomon would do anything to keep her safe. He kisses her forehead and runs off.

Three weeks later, the girls are ready to get the journal. They work their way through Sublevel Two, with some difficulty, but finally get to the place the book is supposed to be. While Liz is hoisted up to get the book, Cammie and the other roommates become aware that there is someone else trying to break in. They assume it is Agent Townsend (we later learn it was Rachel Morgan), and get out as soon as possible. The book was written in code but the girls find the key, which was the Pigeon Code they had found in the pigeon carrier room. It turns out that the journal belonged to Cammie's father, Matthew Morgan. The journal explains how Matthew Morgan and Joe Solomon tried to bring down the Circle of Cavan. Operative Morgan went missing on the way to Greece. Solomon blames himself because that was supposed to be his mission, and felt it should have been him.

A couple nights later Zach sneaks into Cammie's room and wakes her up. They take a walk and she asks him why the Circle would break Joe Solomon out of a CIA prison if he was working against them. Zach responds saying, "They weren't doing him a favor". Cammie demands more answers, but Zach will not give her any. Her furious roommates show up and try to get answers from him, too. Cammie suggests a plan to go get the other notebook, the one that Joe Solomon wrote, from Blackthorne. Then, Cammie's mother arrives, and she says she will help them.

While in the car, Zach tries to talk to Cammie, but she ignores him. They pull over the van, and we learn that Bex's parents and Aunt Abby are there to protect Cammie. From there, the girls and Zach walk to Blackthorne.Cammie finds out that it was her mother who had tried to get the journal. They had heard her. After going through its various defenses, they learn Blackthorne's cover: it's a school for juvenile delinquents. Macey, Bex, and Liz go shut down the defenses and keep an eye on security, leaving Zach and Cammie alone to complete the mission. Zach asks Cammie to stay, wanting her to be safe, but she responds by kissing him and asks where they are going. "The Tombs," is his reply.

Zach and Cammie go out to the woods and find the entrance to "The Tombs." The make their way through a complicated maze and Zach reveals that Blackthorne is a school for assassins. They finally find the place where Joe Solomon's journal is hidden and retrieve it. As they are about to leave, they hear people coming and hide. They see several members of the Circle of Cavan, including the woman who tried to abduct Cammie from the roof in Boston last summer, and Joe Solomon. The explosives on the walls show that Mr. Solomon brought the members here to kill them and himself in the process. A man finds Cammie and Zach and brings them to the woman. We learn that she is Zach's mom, and Cammie is horrified. After a quick fight Zach manages to get a gun and take aim at the explosives. Cammie says "NO!" but cannot stop Zach, so she begins to run. She thought she had made it out but ran into Zach's mother, and we learn that she was a Gallagher Girl. She tries to convince Cammie to come to her by telling her that her father is still alive. Instead, Cammie jumps off the side of the cliff to get away, thinking that both Zach and Mr. Solomon are dead.

They find her and take her back to the school's infirmary. After having her explain what happened, Agent Townsend takes her to a man who is bandaged from head to toe. We know it is Mr. Solomon, but according to Agent Townsend, Mr. Solomon is "dead". He hands her Mr. Solomon's journal and walks away. Cammie is later talking with her mom and we learn that Zach will stay the rest of the semester at the Gallagher Academy and that Mr. Solomon might not make it. Cammie gives Zach the journal before being ambushed by her distressed roommates. Cammie decides she will not be able to go to her grandparents' ranch this summer because it is too dangerous. One day Cammie and Zach talk, and Zach asks her to run away with him. She kisses him and says she cannot, to which he replies "I know".

Afterwards Cammie describes how being at Gallagher academy is not dangerous to her, but to the people she loves. She asks for no one to look for her. She implies she's running away, but in her words she says to think of it as not running away, but running Towards. She states she will be back once summer vacation is over. This time with answers.

== Characters ==
- Cameron Ann Morgan/Chameleon: Cameron Morgan is an 18-year-old girl who attends the Gallagher Academy. Her mother is the headmistress and her Aunt Abby is a spy legend at the CIA. In this book Cammie becomes more like Bex had been previously, trying to help her former teacher Joe Solomon. She has a complicated relationship with Zachary Goode because she has a hard time trusting him. She is becoming a very good spy, and at the end of the book, decides to run away to protect those whom she loves. Her Dad is supposedly KIA (Killed in Action) though Zach's mother as a coax to get Cammie says he is alive (and that she would take her to him). Whether he is really alive or not is unknown. Cammie is described as having dirty blonde hair (in the fifth book) and of having an average appearance.
- Rebecca Baxter/Bex/Duchess: Bex is the first non-American girl to attend the Gallagher Academy. Her parents work for MI6 and are very good at what they do. In this book, she is less outgoing and carefree because she is concerned for her best friend's safety. She does not trust Zach, but knows that he has valuable information. She loves going on dangerous missions and exciting adventures, unless they put Cammie at risk. Bex is incredibly tough and is described as being exotically beautiful with cappucino coloured skin and black shiny hair.
- Macey McHenry/Peacock: Macey is the most recent of the roommates to attend the Gallagher Academy and is a decedent from Gillian Gallagher. She is the only person understands the loneliness Cammie feels, due to her being a famous politician's daughter. Last semester she was believed to be the target of the Circle of Cavan, but Cammie was actually the target the whole time. Her mother makes "semi-dangerous" cosmetics, and she shows she is a good spy when she runs away from school in Don't Judge a Girl by Her Cover. Macey is described as being the 'boy-expert' and very loyal to her friends, yet ice-cold to her enemies. Her appearance is that of a supermodel with bluntly cut (at her shoulders) yet thick and glossy, black hair and glowing skin. With her intelligence, toughness and Senator father, she is the perfect combination of all her friends.
- Elizabeth Sutton/Liz/Bookworm: Liz is the smartest of the roommates and the only one who chooses the research track of study (except Macey who is not advanced enough yet). She worries for Cammie's safety but always goes for the rational plan, even if it puts them in danger. She always wants to believe that Zachary Goode is not a bad person and encourages Cammie to trust him. She is described as a Southern pixie-ish waif with blonde curls.
- Zachary Goode: Zach was a student at the Blackthorne Institute for Boys but it is apparent he no longer attends. He now travels with Joe Solomon. He is always very mysterious and stealthy but in this book we no longer see the cocky, carefree boy we did before. He worries for Cammie's safety and later risks his life for her. He has a romantic relationship with Cammie and asks her to run away with him at the end of the book. He reveals that the Blackthorne Institute for Boys is not a school for spies but a school for assassins. It is also revealed that the woman who tried to abduct Cammie from Boston last summer is his mother.
- Joe Solomon: He was a teacher at the Gallagher Academy but in this book he is on the run. We learn that he is a member of the Circle of Cavan but has been working with Cammie's father to bring it down for years. He would go anywhere or do anything to protect Cammie. He started writing a journal even before he joined the circle and age 16. He was recruited while attending Blackthorne.
- Rachel Morgan/Headmistress Morgan: Rachel is Cammie's mother and the Headmistress of the Gallagher Academy. She is an excellent spy. She loves her daughter and protects her as much as possible. She is a good friend of Joe Solomon and she lets Zach in the mansion to help them rescue Joe Solomon. She is described as incredibly beautiful with long brown hair that waves down her back.
- Edward Townsend/Agent Townsend: An MI6 agent who interrogates Cammie after the events at the Tower Bridge. He later becomes a teacher at the Gallagher Academy but only takes the job to learn more about Joe Solomon. He is not a very good teacher and wastes the CoveOps girls' time. He is, however, a very good agent. At the end, he pretends Joe Solomon is dead in order to help Mr. Solomon start a new life. He also gave Cammie back Joe's journal and said, "A very interesting choice in books you got there".
- Abigail Cameron/Agent Cameron: Abby is Cammie's aunt and a very good spy who worked with Cammie's father. At the end of Don't Judge a Girl by Her Cover she kissed Joe Solomon, after returning to the school from being shot. She then turned to Rachel Morgan and said, "Well, someone had to do it." She is usually full of spirit and life, but she became more serious after she had been shot and then learned the secret about Joe Solomon. She is usually described as being incredibly beautiful, with similar characteristics to her sister, Rachel. However, in this book, she is described as less outgoing, and her hair has lost some of its 'shine'.

Preceded by Don't Judge a Girl by Her Cover	Gallagher Girls Series; Book 4	Succeeded by Out of Sight, Out of Time
