= Ally Carter =

American writer (born 1974)

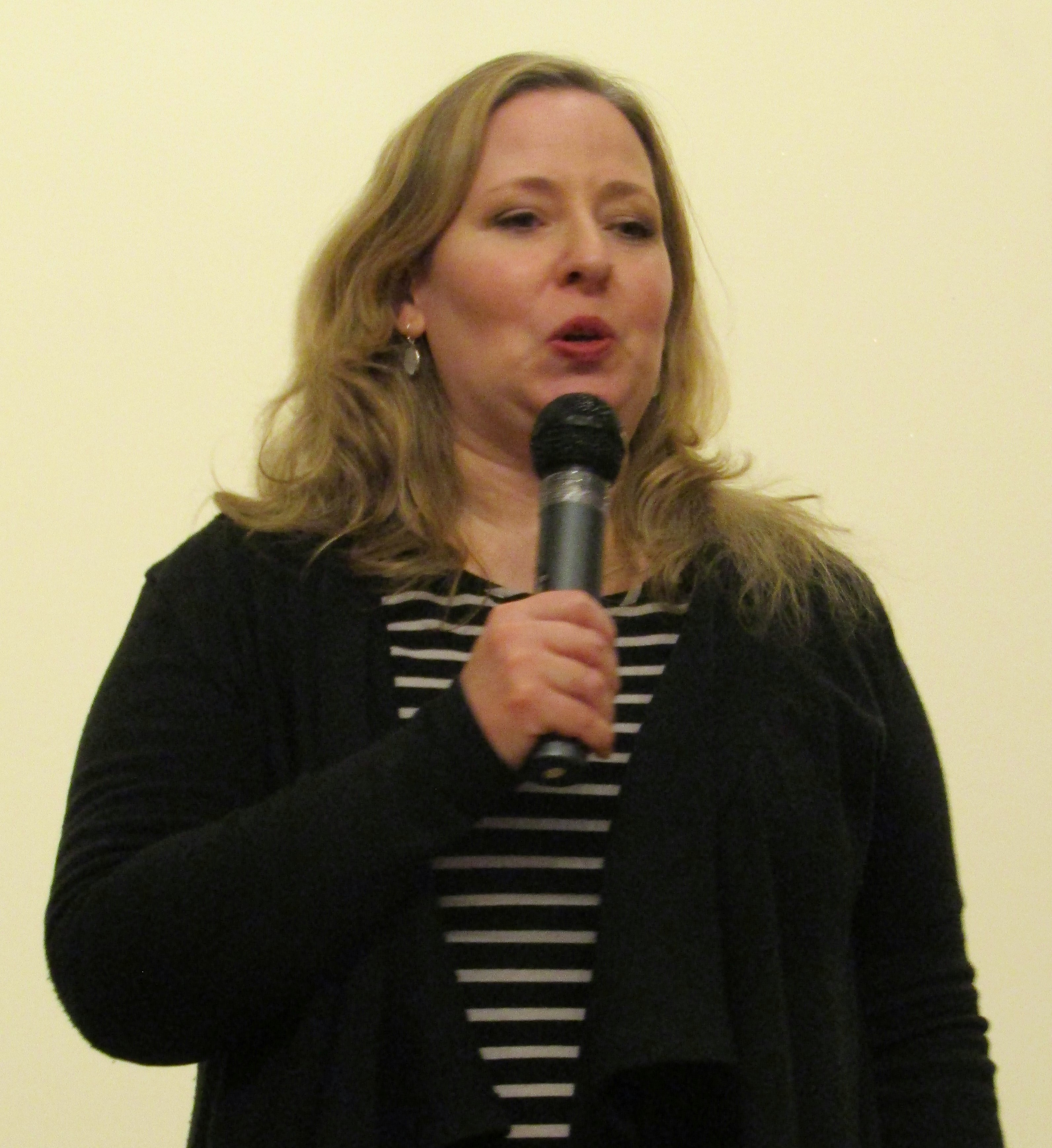
- Ally Carter in the Provo Library at a teen author meet and greet in 2019.
- Born: Sarah Leigh Fogleman; January 1, 1974 (age 52); Locust Grove, Oklahoma, U.S.
- Occupation: Novelist
- Writing career
- Language: English
- Period: 2005–present
- Genres: Chick lit, young adult fiction
- Website: www.allycarter.com

Ally Carter is the pen name of Sarah Leigh Fogleman (born January 1, 1974), an American author of young adult fiction and adult-fiction novels.

== Pen name ==
Carter chose the pen name "Ally Carter" to distinguish the books she would write under that name from her other literary work. The last name "Carter" was specifically selected so that her novels would be near those of her fellow adult fiction novelist Jennifer Crusie on bookstore and library shelves.

== Career ==
=== Education and beginnings ===
Carter graduated with a degree in agricultural economics at Oklahoma State University in 1997 and earned her M.A. at Cornell University for Agricultural Resource and Managerial Economics. In her free time, she began her work as an author of two adult novels, Cheating at Solitaire, published on December 6, 2005, and Learning to Play Gin, which was subsequently released on November 7, 2006. She then began her career as young adult novelist with the Gallagher Girls series and later developed the Heist Society series along with various novellas based on these two series'.

=== The Gallagher Girls series ===
Carter's first young adult novel was I'd Tell You I Love You, But Then I'd Have to Kill You, the story of a girl who goes to a prestigious spy school and falls for a normal boy who has no idea who she really is. It was selected as a Texas Lone Star reading list book for 2007–2008.

The sequel to I'd Tell You I Love You, But Then I'd Have to Kill You, titled Cross My Heart and Hope to Spy was released on October 2, 2007, in the United States. It chronicles the second semester of Cammie Morgan's sophomore year and her self-assigned mission against the boys who have moved into her school. Cross My Heart and Hope to Spy was on The New York Times Best Seller list for ten weeks. The first two books in the series were released in the UK with different covers and website.

The third book of the Gallagher Girls series, Don't Judge a Girl by Her Cover, is about Cammie's junior year where a mysterious organization seems to be trying to kidnap or kill Cammie's friend Macey.

The fourth book of the Gallagher Girls series, Only the Good Spy Young, is about the aftermath of Cammie discovering that the Circle of Cavan is after her, and the discovery of her father's journal in Sublevel Two.

The fifth book of the Gallagher Girls series, Out of Sight, Out of Time was released on March 13, 2012.

Double Crossed a Spies and Thieves Story, a Gallagher Girls and Heist Society novella, depicting the point of view of Cammie's friend Macey between book's two and three of the Heist Society series. This title was released on January 22, 2020, as an eBook.

The 6th and final Gallagher Girls book, United We Spy, was published on September 24, 2013, detailing Cammie's final semester at the Gallagher Academy as she takes down the Circle of Cavan.

=== The Heist Society series ===
Carter's first young adult book separate from the Gallagher Girls is the start of a new young adult series about a girl named Kat, with the title Heist Society, whose family business is thievery. Kat's father is suspected to have stolen a mafia group boss's paintings. The only way Kat can save her father is by finding who stole them and stealing them back. It was released February 9, 2010. It was selected as a Texas Lone Star reading list book for 2011.

The second Heist Society book called Uncommon Criminals was released on June 21, 2011.

The third book in the Heist Society series, Perfect Scoundrels, was released on February 5, 2013.

Double Crossed a Spies and Thieves Story is considered a Heist Society novella as well as a part of the Gallagher Girls series and it is therefore a crossover between the two series'.

=== The Embassy Row series ===
The first book of the Embassy Row series, titled All Fall Down, was published January 20, 2015. All Fall Down is a novel that challenges normative thinking and is about a girl named Grace Blakley who is forced to live with her grandfather on Embassy Row in Valencia after the secretive death of her mother.

On December 22, 2015, Ally Carter released the second book in the Embassy Row series, See How They Run.

The third and final book of the Embassy Row series is called Take the Key and Lock Her Up. This novel was released on December 27, 2016.

=== Other works ===
The standalone novel, Not If I Save You First, was first published on March 27, 2018. In a world of politics and secrecy, Maddie and Logan become bestfriends until they are not. Maddie is the daughter of a Secret Service agent and Logan the son of the President of the United States. Years after they are forced to separate, they meet again but under vastly different and dangerous circumstances.

Ally Carter officially released her first Middle Grades book on March 3, 2020, called Winterborne Home for Vengeance and Valor. It tells a story about a young girl named April who must unravel the mysteries left by her mother and the Winterborne household while struggling to find help in a world that left her an orphan.

== Selected works ==
=== Gallagher Girls series ===
1. I'd Tell You I Love You, But Then I'd Have to Kill You (2006)
2. Cross My Heart and Hope to Spy (2007)
3. Don't Judge a Girl by Her Cover (2009)
4. Only the Good Spy Young (2010)
5. Out of Sight, Out of Time (2012)
6. United We Spy (2013)
7. The Spies That Bind (2018) — released as a prequel via Audible

=== Heist Society series ===
1. Heist Society (2010)
2. Uncommon Criminals (2011)
3. Perfect Scoundrels (2013)

=== Embassy Row series ===
1. All Fall Down (2015)
2. See How They Run (2015)
3. Take The Key And Lock Her Up (2016)

=== Winterborne Home series ===
1. Winterborne Home for Vengeance and Valor (2020)
2. Winterborne Home for Mayhem and Mystery (2021)

=== Cheating at Solitaire series ===
1. Cheating At Solitaire (2005)
2. Learning to Play Gin (2006)

=== Blonde Identity series ===
1. The Blonde Identity (2023)
2. The Blonde Who Came in from the Cold (2025)

=== Kiss, Marry, Kill series ===
1. The Most Wonderful Crime of the Year (2024)
2. It’s Beginning to Look a Lot Like Murder (2026)

=== Standalone books ===
- Not If I Save You First (2018)
- Dear Ally, How Do You Write a Book? (2020)

=== Novellas ===
- Double Crossed: A Spies and Thieves Story (2013)
- The Grift of the Magi (2016)

=== Anthologies ===
- My True Love Gave to Me (2014)
