= Desmond Cory =

British writer

Shaun Lloyd McCarthy
- Born: 16 February 1928; Lancing, West Sussex
- Died: 31 January 2001 (aged 72); Marbella, Spain
- Education: Steyning Grammar School; St Peter's College, Oxford
- Occupation: Author
- Known for: Author of the Johnny Fedora series
- Spouse: Blanca Rosa Poyatos
- Children: 4 children

Desmond Cory (16 February 1928 in Lancing, Sussex – 31 January 2001 in Marbella, Spain) was a pseudonym used by British mystery/thriller writer Shaun Lloyd McCarthy.

Desmond Cory wrote over 45 novels, including the creation of serial characters such as Johnny Fedora, a debonair British secret agent. Cory also wrote screenplays for Graham Greene novels (such as England Made Me) and had a number of his own novels appear on the big-screen and in TV thriller series.

Desmond Cory was arguably one of Britain's most prolific thriller writers. His writing spans over 40 years, during which time he used up to three different pen names, such was the demand for his work. Academics cover his works in such books as British Mystery and Thriller Writers Since 1940, and Detecting Men: A Reader's Guide and Checklist for Mystery Series Written By Men.

== Critical acclaim ==
"Even though Johnny Fedora predates James Bond, comparisons with Ian Fleming's better known hero are inevitable. Agent 007's popularity is often attributed to the admission by President John F. Kennedy that From Russia With Love was one of his favourite novels. After that revelation in 1957, sales of the Fleming spy novel soared. Seven years later when [Cory's] Hammerhead was republished in the United States as Shockwave, the book jacket carried a quote from Anthony Boucher of The New York Times saying that Johnny Fedora "more than deserves to take over James Bond's avid audience." Reviews of Feramontov and Ian Fleming's Octopussy appeared side by side in The New York Times Book Review of 1966. Of Feramontov a reviewer said, "As one has come to expect from Cory, colorful action, copious carnage, elaborate intrigue, frequent surprises." Octopussy, however, was dismissed as "a thin and even emaciated volume." In reviewing Timelock, Boucher commented, "I must say once more that I find Cory's Johnny Fedora a much more persuasive violent, sexy and lucky agent than James Bond."
—Prof. Marcia Songer – taken from her white-paper on the Evolution of Desmond Cory – 2003 "There is these days a comparatively slender band of first-class writers who are producing thrillers worthy of serious attention – among them authors like Margery Allingham, John Creasey, Carter Dickson, David Dodge, Ellery Queen, Simenon, and, of course Agatha Christie. Among them, too, is Desmond Cory, a man whose ingenuity, imagination, and good humour pervade his works with an agreeable excitement and read-ability."
—Bristol Evening Post 1960

"You hear that there was a Golden Age of thrillers in Britain between the wars. When you read Cory you realize that it hasn't ended."
—Echo – 1993

"Readers who like their thrillers to complement their intelligence must on no account miss Mr. Cory".
—Edmund Crispin, The Sunday Times 1971
