= William Garner (novelist) =

English thriller writer

William Garner (born 1920, in Grimsby, Lincolnshire, England - 2005) was an English thriller writer.

== Life and work ==
Garner graduated from the University of Birmingham in 1941 with a BSc (with honors). He served with the Royal Air Force from 1941 to 1946, rising to the rank of flight lieutenant.

He married Gwen Owen in 1944 while she was in the WAAF. Their daughter Lesley Garner is the Daily Telegraph's self-help columnist.

He was public relations director for Monsanto Company, London, from 1949 to 1964, and for Massey Ferguson Ltd. (London office) from 1964 to 1966. He became a full-time writer in 1967.

His early novels feature British spy Michael Jagger, a high-living, self-hating, risk-loving ex-agent (in disgrace).

Marghanita Laski writing in The Listener, called Garner "Our cleverest thriller writer". The Observer believed Garner was "A novelist of stature who leaves his own distinctive imprint on the le Carré scene." The Crime Writers' Association short-listed Rat's Alley for their Gold Dagger award.

When asked to describe himself, Garner replied "Strongly motivated. Views on almost everything that matters. Views on what matters might differ from those of many."

He is also the author of the article "Spies and sex make a puzzling mix", first published in The Observer in 1987.

Arthritis increasingly crippled Garner's hands later in life, preventing him from writing.

== Bibliography ==
=== Michael Jagger novels ===
- Overkill (1966)
- The Deep, Deep Freeze (1968)
- The Us or Them War (1969)
- A Big Enough Wreath (1974)

=== John Morpurgo trilogy ===
- Think Big, Think Dirty (1983)
- Rats' Alley (1984)
- Zones of Silence (1986)

=== Novels ===
- The Puppet-Masters (1969) published in the U.S. as "The Manipulators"
- The Andra Fiasco (1971) published in the U.S. as "Strip Jack Naked"
- Ditto, Brother Rat (1972)
- The Mobius Trip (1978)
- Paper Chase (1988)
- Sleeping Dogs (1990)
