= Thomas F. Murphy (author) =

American author (born 1939)

Thomas F. Murphy (born 1939) is an American author who began writing after he retired from the CIA in 1992. He served in Brazil (1973–1975), Hungary (1977–1979), Zaire (1983–1986), and France (1989–1992).

His novel Edge of Allegiance is considered "insider" spy fiction. The novel is the fictional postmortem of a failed Cold-War human intelligence (HUMINT) operation that the author calls the Bagatelle case.
