= Manning Coles =

Collective pseudonym

Manning Coles was the pseudonym of two British writers, Adelaide Frances Oke Manning (1891–1959) and Cyril Henry Coles (1899–1965), who wrote many spy thrillers from the early 1940s to the early 1960s. The fictional protagonist in 26 of their books was Thomas Elphinstone Hambledon, who works for a department of the Foreign Office, usually referred to in the novels as "MI5".

== Biography ==
Manning and Coles were neighbours in East Meon, Hampshire. Coles worked for British Intelligence in both the World Wars. Manning worked for the War Office during World War I. Their first books were fairly realistic and with a touch of grimness; their postwar books perhaps suffered from an excess of lightheartedness and whimsy. They also wrote a number of humorous novels about modern-day ghosts, some of them involving ghostly cousins named Charles and James Latimer. These novels were published in England under the pseudonym of Francis Gaite but released in the United States under the Manning Coles byline.

Many of the original exploits were based on the real-life experiences of Coles, who lied about his age and enlisted under an assumed name in a Hampshire regiment during World War I while still a teenager. He eventually became the youngest officer in British intelligence, often working behind German lines, due to his extraordinary ability to master languages.

== Tommy Hambledon ==
Thomas Elphinstone Hambledon works for a department of the Foreign Office, usually referred to in the novels as "MI5" (counter-intelligence), although in the earliest books he is clearly working for the active overseas department MI6. The character is thought to have been based by Coles on a former teacher of his.

== Tommy Hambledon novels ==
- Drink to Yesterday, 1940
- Toast To Tomorrow (1940)
- Pray Silence, 1940 (American title: A Toast to Tomorrow)
- They Tell No Tales, 1941
- Without Lawful Authority, 1943
- Green Hazard, 1945
- The Fifth Man, 1946
- Let the Tiger Die, 1947
- A Brother for Hugh, 1947 (American title: With Intent to Deceive)
- Among Those Absent, 1948
- Diamonds to Amsterdam, 1949
- Not Negotiable, 1949
- Dangerous by Nature, 1950
- Now or Never, 1951
- Alias Uncle Hugo, 1952 (British title: Operation Manhunt, 1953)
- Night Train to Paris, 1952
- A Knife for the Juggler, 1953 (revised American edition, 1964; also published as The Vengeance Man, 1967)
- Not for Export, 1954 (American title: All That Glitters; also published as The Mystery of the Stolen Plans, 1960)
- The Man in the Green Hat, 1955
- The Basle Express, 1956
- Birdwatcher's Quarry, 1956 (British title: The Three Beans, 1957)
- Death of an Ambassador, 1957
- No Entry, 1958
- Crime in Concrete, 1960 (American title: Concrete Crime)
- Search for a Sultan, 1961 (by Coles and Tom Hammerton)
- The House at Pluck's Gutter, 1963 (by Coles and Tom Hammerton)

== Tommy Hambledon short story collection ==
- Nothing to Declare, 1960

== Novels without Tommy Hambledon ==
- Half-Valdez, 1939 (by Manning alone)
- This Fortress, 1942

== Ghost novels under the Francis Gaite byline ==
- Great Caesar's Ghost (juvenile), 1943 (British title: The Emperor's Bracelet, 1947)(non-ghost; a "lost city" story)
- Brief Candles (The Latimers), 1954
- Happy Returns (The Latimers), 1955 (British title: A Family Matter, 1956)
- The Far Traveler, 1956
- Come and Go (The Latimers), 1958
- Duty Free, 1959 (non-ghost novel)

== Uncollected short historical essay ==
"Death Keeps a Secret" (John Creasey Mystery Magazine, March 1958; reprinted in The Mystery Bedside Book (1960), edited by John Creasey} is a brief account of the capture and death of Colonel Alfred Redl, an Austrian spymaster and traitor in the First World War: was he shot by his captors, or did he commit suicide?
