= Don't Judge a Girl by Her Cover =

Novel by Ally Carter

- US Hardcover
- Author: Ally Carter
- Illustrator: Dayne Smith
- Cover artist: Luke Dark
- Language: English
- Series: Gallagher Girl
- Publisher: Disney Hyperion
- Publication date: June 9, 2009
- Publication place: United States
- Media type: Print (hardcover)
- Pages: 272
- ISBN: 978-1-4231-1638-7
- OCLC: 262883828
- Preceded by: Cross My Heart and Hope to Spy
- Followed by: Only the Good Spy Young

Don't Judge a Girl by Her Cover is a 2009 young adult novel written by Ally Carter. It is the sequel to Cross My Heart and Hope to Spy and the third book in the Gallagher Girls series. It was published on June 9, 2009. The cover was released on March 19, 2009. As of February 28, 2009, author Ally Carter posted mini-excerpts of the book on her blog, with the promise that while they would be in the book, they might be misleading. The book spent three weeks, from June 19, 2009, to July 3, 2009 on the Children's Books version of The New York Times Best Seller list, debuting at #6.

The main character Cammie joins Liz and Bex as Macey's private security team on the campaign trail. The girls use their spy training at every turn as the stakes are raised, and Cammie discovers an "the unexpected truth", that she is the target of a secret society.

== Characters ==
- Cameron 'Cammie' Morgan: A 16-year-old girl attending the Gallagher Academy. Her mother is the headmistress, and her Aunt Abby is a spy. In this book, Cammie is more concerned about Zach and spends a lot of time with Macey McHenry. She later discovers that she is the real target of Cavan; when the Circle yelled, "Get her!" they were referring to her and not Macey. Her mom, Solomon, Abby, and most of the teachers all knew that Cammie was the target.
- Macey McHenry/Peacock: The rich daughter of Senator McHenry, a man running to be the vice president of the United States. She is described to have glossy black hair and a nose ring (only in the first two books). In the book, Macey was suspected of being the target of the Circle of Cavan, an ancient group. She grows closer to Cammie in this book as they spend a lot of time together. She finds Mr. Solomon's lakeside cabin a peaceful place. She didn't tell anyone but Cammie found out from spying on her. In the end, it was revealed that she was never the target; instead Cammie was. She finds out she is Gillian Gallagher's (the school's founder) great-great-granddaughter when she overhears Cammie and Zach.
- Rebecca 'Bex' Baxter/Duchess: A British girl who is the first non-American to attend the Gallagher Academy. She is described as being fit with dark skin and black hair. She is very dramatic and is a good fighter. In the book, she helped Cammie gatecrash political events and convinced her to sneak into Abby's office. She also had the idea of hog-tying Macey to her chair to keep her safe. It was said that the only way she would ever not attend a mission is if she was unconscious, tied up, and locked in a concrete bunker in Siberia.
- Elizabeth 'Liz' Sutton/Bookworm: A genius, blond, skinny Southern girl who has no interest in taking Covert Ops and prefers to do research instead of field work. She often says, "Oopsie daisy" after small accidents due to her clumsiness. In the book, she loaned them a special car she'd created with Doctor Fibs, the school's inventor, and attempted to find out where the symbol on the ring was from.
- Zachary 'Zach' Goode: A student of Blackthorne Institute for Boys, Zach is very mysterious and often conceals the truth from Cammie to protect her. Cammie is not sure if she can trust him. Zach hints that he is no longer attending the Blackthorne Institute for boys and that he has sources that deliver information. One of the things he found out about the incident in Boston is that Macey is not the target. At the end, he leaves Cammie a note telling her to have fun in London where she will be spending Christmas holidays with Bex and her parents.
- Aunt Abigail 'Abby' Cameron: Cammie's aunt who is also a spy. She is quite sassy and more inclined to break rules than Cammie's mother. She is friends with Bex's parents and was sent to protect Macey. She flirted with Mr. Solomon throughout the book and ended up kissing him in the end for 87 seconds. When she gets shocked looks from her sister and Mr. Solomon she said, "Someone had to do it." She was shot by the Circle of Cavan but survives and is seen heading off on a new mission.
- Joseph 'Joe' Solomon: The Gallagher Academy's Covert Operations teacher who knew Cammie's dad and is friends with Zach. He brings Macey and Cammie to his lakeside cabin when they were injured. He is described as being a hunk. Students were seen discussing if Mr. Smith's new face (a teacher who goes for plastic surgery every year) was as hot as him or even hotter. He was seen talking to Zach during a political party. He was kissed by Abby at the end of the book and was shocked, but didn't look mad.
- Rachel Morgan : Cammie's mother and the headmistress of the Gallagher Academy. She is described as being fun but often keeps secrets from her daughter. She misses her (possibly) dead husband and is shown to be a bad cook. In the book, she didn't tell Cammie that she knew that Macey was never the target. She promises to Cammie that she will find out why Cammie is the target.
- Circle of Cavan: An ancient group hundreds of years old; they are the villains in this book. They attempted to kill Lincoln but were thwarted by Gillian Gallagher. It was revealed that Gilly killed their leader with her own sword, the sword that is on display at the Gallagher Academy. Cammie realized who they were when she saw that one of the members wore a ring that had a symbol similar to the one on Gilly's sword. They intend to try to capture Cammie and ask her questions about her father that the Circle of Cavan killed.

Preceded by Cross My Heart and Hope to Spy	Gallagher Girls Series; Book 3	Succeeded by Only the Good Spy Young
