= Thomas Elphinstone Hambledon =

Fictional character by Manning Coles

Thomas Elphinstone Hambledon (Tommy Hambledon) is the fictional protagonist of many spy novels written by the British author "Manning Coles" (actually the two-person writing team of Adelaide Frances Oke Manning and Cyril Henry Coles) from 1940 through 1963. He works for a department of the Foreign Office, usually referred to in the novels as "MI5" (counter-intelligence), although in the earliest books he is clearly working for the active overseas department MI6.

== Character background ==
Hambledon is a teacher in a British boarding school in his first appearance in Drink to Yesterday (1940) and, during school holidays, a spy in Germany for the Foreign Office. At the end of this book, which takes place in World War I and in which he is known only as Tommy Hambledon, he disappears at sea and is presumed dead. He reappears as the hero of the next book, Pray Silence (1940) (known in the U.S. by the title Toast to Tomorrow), which begins in the 1920s. He is an amnesiac in Germany who gradually works his way up in the fledgling Nazi Party until, in 1933, he becomes Hitler's Chief of Police. He recovers his memory on the night of the Reichstag fire, and thereafter battles to defeat Hitler and his plans. His full name is revealed to be Thomas Elphinstone Hambledon. At the end of the book he fakes his own death in Danzig (Hitler himself delivers the eulogy at his 'funeral') and stows away with his colleague, Alfred Reck, on a British cargo ship bound for Cardiff. On their return to Britain he and Reck are faced with the problem of a series of unexplained sinkings of ships not long out of harbour in Portsmouth in They Tell No Tales (1941).

In Green Hazard (1945) the Gestapo mistake him for Professor Ulseth, inventor of a new and extremely powerful high explosive, and kidnap him. He then finds himself once again in Berlin where he has to fool his 'hosts' into believing that he actually knows something about chemistry whilst praying that they will fail to recognise a former colleague. After World War II, he continues his career in the Foreign Office and helps defeat a number of Communist plots. In these later adventures, he is frequently aided by Forgan and Campbell, a semi-comic team of model-makers from the Clerkenwell Road in London, who first appear in A Brother for Hugh (1947). In this and some other of Manning Coles' subsequent novels Hambledon actually occupies quite a minor role — in The Man in the Green Hat (1955) he hardly appears at all in the first half of the book.

Hambledon is thought to have been based by Coles on a former teacher of his. He eventually became the youngest officer in British intelligence, often working behind German lines, due to his extraordinary ability to master languages.

Cyril Coles himself was a model maker and was, at the time of his death, building a train set from scratch for his young grandson.

== In popular culture ==
In the season four premiere episode of Archer, the titular secret agent character is similarly suffering from amnesia, believing himself to be the eponymous hamburger chef character of the animated series Bob's Burgers, as both characters are voiced by H. Jon Benjamin. The "Burger of the Day" on the menu board is "Thomas Elphinstone Hambledurger with Manning Coleslaw".

== Bibliography ==
- Silet, Charles L.P. (January 2008). "Drink to Yesterday & A Toast to Tomorrow". Mystery Scene.
- Van Tilburg, Barry (May–June 1980). Guy M. Townsend (ed.). "Spy Series Characters in Hardback II". The Mystery Fancier. 4 (3): 23.
