= The Bourne Identity (novel) =

1980 spy novel by Robert Ludlum

- First edition cover of The Bourne Identity
- Author: Robert Ludlum
- Original title: The Bourne Identity
- Language: English
- Series: Bourne Trilogy
- Genre: Thriller, Spy novel
- Publisher: Richard Marek
- Publication date: February 1980
- Publication place: United States
- Pages: 523 pp (First edition)
- ISBN: 0-399-90070-5
- OCLC: 5675357
- Dewey Decimal: 813/.5/4
- LC Class: PZ4.L9455 Bo PS3562.U26
- Followed by: The Bourne Supremacy

The Bourne Identity is a 1980 spy fiction thriller novel by Robert Ludlum that tells the story of Jason Bourne, a man with remarkable survival abilities who has retrograde amnesia, and must seek to discover his true identity. In the process, he must also determine why several shadowy groups, a professional assassin, and the CIA want him dead. It is the first novel of the original Bourne Trilogy, which also includes The Bourne Supremacy and The Bourne Ultimatum.

Peter Cannon of Publishers Weekly named The Bourne Identity among the best spy novels of all time, after John le Carré's The Spy Who Came in from the Cold.

The novel was the basis for the scripts of the 1988 television movie of the same name starring Richard Chamberlain and Jaclyn Smith, and the 2002 film of the same name, starring Matt Damon, Franka Potente, and Chris Cooper.

== Plot ==
The preface of the novel consists of two real-life newspaper articles from 1975 about terrorist Ilich Ramírez Sánchez, known as "Carlos the Jackal."

The story opens with gunfire on a boat in the Mediterranean Sea. One man is cast into the waves before the boat explodes, and is later picked up by fishermen, who find him clinging to debris. They also find he has amnesia, apparently as a result of a traumatic head injury, with occasional erratic intrusions or flashbacks to the past, but is unable to make sense of them. The only definite evidence of his former life is a small film negative found embedded in his hip containing the information required to access a bank account in Zurich.

After being nursed back to health by a local doctor, he goes to Zurich to gain access to the bank, where a clerk recognizes him. The man determines that his name is "Jason Charles Bourne", that he has relations with a firm called Treadstone Seventy-One Corporation, and that his account holds 7.5 million Swiss francs (equivalent to $5 million in the novel). Circumstantial evidence leads Bourne to suspect that he should go to Paris, so he wires most of the money there. At the bank and his hotel, men try to kill Bourne, so he quickly takes another hotel guest, Canadian government economist Marie St. Jacques, as a hostage in order to escape. After escaping from Bourne, St. Jacques reports his whereabouts to men she thinks are police, but they turn out to be Bourne's pursuers and professional killers who try to rape and kill her. When Bourne rescues her at the risk of his own life, St. Jacques decides to help him.

They head to Paris to find clues about Bourne's past. Once in Paris, Bourne learns that his attackers' leader may be "Carlos," who is described as the most dangerous terrorist of his time, responsible for numerous killings in many countries and well connected in the highest government circles. For reasons only partly comprehensible to himself, Bourne develops a compulsion to hunt Carlos. As the story develops, Bourne follows clues that bring him closer to Carlos, leading him to places such as a designer clothing store used as a relay for Carlos. Though Bourne twice briefly sees Carlos, he does not manage to catch or kill him. To his distress, Bourne also finds mounting evidence that he himself is a rival assassin called "Cain". Meanwhile, he and St. Jacques fall in love. St. Jacques tries to convince Bourne that he is not the killer he thinks he was.

It turns out that Cain is an alias that had been assumed by Bourne to hunt down Carlos; Cain took credit for kills as a way of challenging Carlos as part of a top-secret American plot. The plot is called Treadstone Seventy-One, and the truth is known only to eight men selected by covert agencies of the U.S. government; everyone else assumes Cain to be a real person. Due to Bourne's six-month silence (while he was recuperating) and the unauthorized diversion of millions of dollars from the Zurich account, the Treadstone men start to believe that Bourne has become a traitor. They are entirely convinced of his guilt when Carlos has two of his operatives storm the building in which Treadstone is based and kill those inside, and then frame Bourne for the murders. The man now responsible for Treadstone, Alexander Conklin, attempts to lure Bourne into a meeting outside of Paris to kill him. Bourne escapes the trap, but does not succeed in proving his innocence.

In Paris, Bourne has managed to convince a French general named Villiers to help him. Bourne realizes that Villiers' wife, Carlos' first cousin, is a mole for Carlos. When the General hears about it, he kills his wife, but Bourne takes the blame in order to bait Carlos into following him to the United States. Only after Bourne has left do St. Jacques and Villiers manage to convince Treadstone members that Bourne is innocent, and is continuing to hunt Carlos. In New York, Bourne is confronted by Carlos. They wound each other, but when Carlos is on the verge of killing Bourne, some of the remaining Treadstone members arrive at the scene and force Carlos to retreat.

The epilogue sees St. Jacques being told about Bourne's past, most of which had been revealed in fragments already: He had been an American Foreign Service officer stationed in Asia during the Vietnam War as part of an operation codenamed Medusa. When his wife and two children were killed, he joined a paramilitary special forces unit in Vietnam. During a mission, he discovered and executed the double agent Jason Bourne. He took the name years later when he was recruited for Treadstone.

At the novel's end, it is revealed that "Bourne" has recovered from the encounter with Carlos and presumably lives together with St. Jacques. He remains the only one to ever have seen the face of Carlos and may be able to recognize him, but is unable to do so due to his erratic memory. As a consequence, he is protected day and night by armed watchmen, in the hope he will one day recover enough to identify Carlos. The plot closes with him remembering his first name, David.

== Concept ==
Robert Ludlum gave two interviews to Don Swaim of CBS: in 1984 and then two years later in 1986. Ludlum discusses how he came up with the first two novels in the Jason Bourne trilogy—The Bourne Identity and The Bourne Supremacy. The idea behind the Bourne trilogy came after he had a bout of temporary amnesia. After his first book, The Scarlatti Inheritance, was published, he could not remember 12 hours of his life. This event, combined with thrilling real-life spy stories, inspired him to write the Jason Bourne trilogy.

== The name "Bourne" ==
ABC News speculated that the name was actually "most likely" inspired by Ansel Bourne, a famous 19th-century psychology case due to his experience of a probable dissociative fugue. Ansel Bourne one day left his previous life and built himself a new life with a new profession elsewhere under a new name ("A. J. Brown"); after two months, he woke up with no memories of this new life, but with memories recovered up to this time and returned to his old life. The rare and controversial dissociative fugue has been described "a state in which an individual has lost their identity" by Harvard psychologist Daniel Schacter. "They don't know who they are, and they've lost all information about their past. They go on functioning automatically."

== Publication history ==
- 1980, US, Richard Marek ISBN 0-399-90070-5, Pub date February 1980, Hardback.
- 1982, US, Bantam Books ISBN 0-553-24296-2, Pub date April 1, 1982, Paperback.
- 1984, US, Bantam Books ISBN 978-0553260113, Pub date February 1, 1984, Paperback.
- 1986, UK, Grafton ISBN 0-246-11121-6 Pub date June 19, 1986, Hardback.
- 1997, UK, HarperCollins ISBN 0-586-04934-7, Pub date December 1, 1997, Paperback
- 2004, UK, Orion Publishing Group ISBN 978-0752858548, Pub date May 6, 2004, Paperback.
- 2010, UK, Orion Publishing Group ISBN 978-1409117698, Pub date February 4, 2010, Paperback.

== Sequels ==
Ludlum wrote two sequels to The Bourne Identity: The Bourne Supremacy and The Bourne Ultimatum, forming the Bourne Trilogy. After Ludlum's death, author Eric Van Lustbader continued the story of Jason Bourne in The Bourne Legacy (2004), The Bourne Betrayal (2007), The Bourne Sanction (2008), The Bourne Deception (2009), The Bourne Objective (2010), The Bourne Dominion (2011), The Bourne Imperative (2012), The Bourne Retribution (2013), The Bourne Ascendancy (2014), The Bourne Enigma (2016), and The Bourne Initiative (2017).

== Adaptations ==
The novel has been adapted as The Bourne Identity, a 1988 television movie starring Richard Chamberlain and Jaclyn Smith. The story was also partially adapted in the 1989 Tamil language film Vetri Vizha starring Kamal Haasan.

The 2002 film The Bourne Identity starring Matt Damon, Franka Potente and Chris Cooper has largely modernized the material and is only very loosely based on the central premise of the novel.
