= The Bourne Ultimatum =

1990 novel by Robert Ludlum

- First edition cover of The Bourne Ultimatum
- Author: Robert Ludlum
- Language: English
- Series: Bourne Trilogy
- Genre: Thriller, spy
- Publisher: Random House
- Publication date: February 25, 1990
- Publication place: United States
- Media type: Print (hardback & paperback)
- Pages: 611 pp (first edition)
- ISBN: 0-394-58408-2
- OCLC: 20320080
- Dewey Decimal: 813/.54 20
- LC Class: PS3562.U26 B685 1990
- Preceded by: The Bourne Supremacy
- Followed by: The Bourne Legacy

The Bourne Ultimatum is the third Jason Bourne novel written by Robert Ludlum and a sequel to The Bourne Supremacy (1986). First published in 1990, it was the last Bourne novel to be written by Ludlum himself. Eric Van Lustbader wrote a sequel titled The Bourne Legacy fourteen years later.

A film of the same name starring Matt Damon was released in 2007. As in the 2004 film, The Bourne Supremacy, the film version of The Bourne Ultimatum has a completely different plot from the novel.

== Plot summary ==
After a message in the form of a murder at a carnival indicates his old enemy, Carlos the Jackal, has resurfaced, David Webb, aka Jason Bourne, works to find him. As the Jackal enters old age and his infamy fades, he decides that he will do two things before he dies: kill Webb/Bourne, and destroy the KGB facility of Novgorod, where the Jackal was trained and was turned away for being a maniac. Carlos the Jackal uses a diverse collective of aged men devoted to his handiwork known as "The Old Men of Paris." The old men, who are mostly criminals, work for the Jackal in return for their family's comfort. Webb sends his wife and children to live with her brother, John St. Jacques, in the Caribbean for protection while Webb himself works with old friend and CIA agent Alexander Conklin, and to a limited degree, the CIA, to hunt down and kill the Jackal first.

While in the Caribbean, the St. Jacques Family faces a number of complications. A "War Hero" (actually an "Old Man of Paris") arrives, who is supposed to assassinate Marie St. Jacques and her two children, and spray paint "Jason Bourne, brother of the Jackal" on the wall. At the same time, a former judge, Brendan P. Prefontaine, arrives. The Jackal thinks that Prefontaine was going to foil his murder plan, and bribes a nurse on the island to kill him. However, his plans are foiled when the "war hero" finds out that when he is done with the murder, he is to be assassinated as well. He turns sides and shoots the nurse, saving Prefontaine. After the foiled assassination, Webb returns to the Caribbean. At the time of his visit, the Jackal himself comes to try to kill Webb, at the same time killing three security guards, the Crown Governor of the island, the "Old Man of Paris" who changed sides (strapped explosives on him), severely beats a waiter, and wounds Jason Bourne in the neck with a bullet (this is the Jackal's trademark and no one has survived it until now).

Webb poses as an important member of Medusa (a newer version than the original he was associated with during the Vietnam era) (see Jason Bourne), now a nearly omnipotent economic force that controls the head of NATO, leading figures in the Defense Department, portions of the American and Sicilian mafia, and large NYSE firms. After several assassinations of key Medusa figures he was interrogating, he realizes that Medusa had nothing to do with the Jackal. The people who wanted to kill him were hired by Medusa and not the Jackal. After that, he goes back undercover and finds Jacqueline Lavier (who is really Dominique Lavier, her sister) who pretends to help him. She is part of the Jackal's group. She phones the Jackal of the location of Bourne's hotel, but is caught by Bourne. However, Bourne sets a trap for the Jackal, only to be foiled by his wife when she sees him. The Jackal realizes it is a trap and runs. Also, John St. Jacques and Bourne's children are relocated to a CIA safe house. However, Pritchard, a clerk, overhears John St. Jacques and Bourne's phone and tells his uncle, who was bribed by the Jackal for 300 pounds. Then, Alex Conklin, Marie St. Jacques, Jason Bourne, and Mo Panov (David's doctor) go to Russia to meet one of Alex's long-time friends. The friend helps them several times.

When they first meet, the Jackal invades the restaurant they meet at and spray paints on the wall the exact location of Jason's son. Jason immediately calls the CIA and they relocate the children. At the same time, Alex and Jason realize that the Russian contact for the Jackal was high up in the KGB. Their Russian contact searches up a list of 13 people, who he keeps traces on. They catch the traitor when he goes to a church to meet the Jackal, along with Ogilvie, an American Medusa traitor. However, Ogilvie is set up by the KGB officials and is photographed with the Jackal. Later, the Jackal tells the Russian traitor that he is being followed by his own government and shows him proof by killing two KGB agents that were following the Russian. The Jackal then kills him. Later, the Jackal meets with a board of Russian traitors. They disavow him and refuse to help him. He goes crazy and kills them all with his Type 56 AK-47 assault rifle, but leaves a woman barely alive, who identifies the Jackal to the police, who in turn notify Alex Conklin.

The Jackal comes to the hotel Webb is at and a furious chase happens, but the Jackal manages to escape to an armory, get weapons, go to Novgorod, and bomb the place. However, Bourne meets him there and they fight. The Jackal runs away, and Bourne throws a grenade, wounding him. One of the officials then closes the gates to the river, and the river rises, drowning the Jackal. Bourne then returns to the Caribbean, where their Russian friend meets them, and the former accepts that Jason Bourne is dead.

== Sequels ==
After Ludlum's death, Eric Van Lustbader continued the story of Jason Bourne in a sequel titled The Bourne Legacy. He has also written subsequent novels in the series entitled The Bourne Betrayal, The Bourne Sanction, The Bourne Deception, The Bourne Objective, The Bourne Dominion, The Bourne Imperative, The Bourne Retribution, The Bourne Ascendancy, and The Bourne Enigma.

== Publication history ==
- 1990, US, Random House ISBN 0-394-58408-2, Pub date February 25, 1990, Hardback.
- 1990, US, Bantam Books ISBN 0-553-17342-1, Pub date August 1990, Paperback.
- 1990, UK, Grafton ISBN 0-246-12575-6 Pub date March 8, 1990, Hardback.
- 1991, UK, HarperCollins ISBN 0-586-06456-7, Pub date March 28, 1991, Paperback.
