= The Bourne Legacy (novel) =

2004 novel by Eric Van Lustbader

- The Bourne Legacy first edition cover
- Author: Robert Ludlum (series creator); Eric Van Lustbader
- Cover artist: Craig White
- Language: English
- Series: Jason Bourne
- Genre: Spy
- Publisher: St. Martin's Press
- Publication date: June 22, 2004
- Publication place: United States
- Media type: Print (hardback & paperback)
- Pages: 464 pp (first edition)
- ISBN: 0-312-33175-4
- OCLC: 55488053
- Dewey Decimal: 813/.54 22
- LC Class: PS3562.U752 R63 2004
- Preceded by: The Bourne Ultimatum
- Followed by: The Bourne Betrayal

The Bourne Legacy is a 2004 spy fiction thriller written by Eric Van Lustbader. It is the fourth novel in the Jason Bourne series created by Robert Ludlum and the first to be written by Lustbader. He has also written other novels in the series, The Bourne Betrayal, The Bourne Sanction, The Bourne Deception, The Bourne Objective, The Bourne Dominion, The Bourne Imperative, The Bourne Retribution, The Bourne Ascendancy, The Bourne Enigma and The Bourne Initiative.

== Plot summary ==
With the climactic events of The Bourne Ultimatum behind him, Jason Bourne is able to once again become David Webb, now professor of linguistics at Georgetown University. However, this serenity does not last for long and, when a silenced gunshot narrowly misses Webb's head, the Bourne persona awakens in him yet again.

Bourne's first objective is to get to his longtime friend and handler at the CIA, Alex Conklin.

However, unbeknownst (as yet) to Bourne, a Hungarian by the name of Stepan Spalko has now drawn Jason into a web—one which he cannot escape as easily as his professorial façade.

Finding Alex dead along with Dr Morris Panov, Bourne realizes the trap as soon as he hears the police arriving. With his car outside and his fingerprints in the house, he immediately understands that he has been framed.

So, with only Conklin's cell phone and a torn page from a notebook to go on, Jason Bourne sets off to find out who is trying to kill him and who killed his friends.

After warning Marie and his two children, Jamie and Alyssa, to proceed immediately towards their safe house, he slips through the CIA cordon and makes his way to an independent agent who was talking to Conklin when he was killed. Having received travel plans to Hungary and a mission to meet Janos Vadas, Conklin's contact in Hungary, Bourne proceeds to unravel the truth behind why Conklin and Panov were killed.

Meanwhile, a group of Chechen terrorists have been fighting a losing battle against Russian invaders when a man named Stepan Spalko appears to solve their problems. Spalko, we later discover, had Conklin and Panov killed and kidnapped a doctor by the name of Felix Schiffer. Schiffer is an expert in bacteriological particulate behavior.

Spalko intends to release a bacteriological weapon during peace negotiations between many world leaders to be held in Reykjavík, using the terrorists he is cultivating as a diversion.

The book charts Bourne's course from the United States, to France and then to Budapest in Hungary where he learns the final thing he needs to do—to stop Spalko's attack in Iceland.

This, of course, all has to be done in the face of a CIA sanction for him to be immediately terminated, as he is believed responsible for the deaths of Conklin and Panov.

There is also the matter of Spalko's hired assassin, Khan, who is able to track Bourne where everyone else cannot. Khan is revealed to be Joshua Webb, David Webb's son from his first marriage, who believes erroneously that he was left for dead by his father in Vietnam. Bourne, however, refuses to believe that Khan is Joshua, convinced that Joshua was killed decades ago, and continually tries to avoid him and the truth.

Though Khan is at first working for Spalko, he eventually realizes that he has been used as a pawn in Spalko's personal game. After revealing later on to Bourne that Annaka Vadas, the daughter of Janos Vadas, is a traitor, he begins to feel that Bourne is not the hateful father that he had imagined.

Unfortunately, Bourne is still unable to believe Khan is Joshua—until he hacks into the CIA database and discovers that Joshua's body had never been found. In a fit of rage, he attacks Khan, first believing that it is a conspiracy to hurt him, but is later captured by Spalko.

After rescuing Bourne from Spalko, Khan makes an uneasy peace with his father. While on the plane to Iceland, however, Khan reveals a piece of information that finally convinces Bourne that Khan is his son. When Bourne subsequently reveals that he lost his memory while undercover as Cain, Khan begins to rethink his views regarding his father.

After completing the operation and stopping Spalko, Khan makes up with his father and realizes that his hatred was always a reflection of his personal struggles and that, in truth, he truly loved Bourne. He requests Bourne, however, not to reveal his identity to Marie, in whose life he feels he has no place. Meanwhile, a mole in Spalko's company reveals to deputy director of Central Intelligence Martin Lindros that Spalko was behind everything, clearing Bourne's name.

== Reception ==
Publishers Weekly praised the author for not imitating the series creator, Robert Ludlum, stating that "Lustbader has wisely eschewed mimicking Ludlum's signature style—short punchy paragraphs with lots of exclamation points."

== Film ==
George Nolfi, who co-wrote the screenplay for the Bourne Ultimatum film, was to write the screenplay for a fourth film. Matt Damon was also attached to the project from the start, and Julia Stiles as well as Joan Allen had been asked to join the project, with Paul Greengrass slated to return as director. However, in November 2009 Greengrass said he was not interested in directing it, and soon afterwards Matt Damon announced that he would not make the film without Greengrass.

On June 9, 2010, it was announced that Tony Gilroy would be writing and directing a movie entitled The Bourne Legacy that would have a 2012 release date. The new film would have nothing but the title in common with Van Lustbader's novel, and would be a side-story with a new character "in the mold of Bourne", dealing with the ramifications of the events in the third film. Gilroy also stated that he did not rule out a future return by Damon or Greengrass. The film was released in theaters on August 10, 2012.

== See also ==
Audio book review.
