= Jason Bourne =

Fictional character in novels by Robert Ludlum

- Bourne character
- Matt Damon as Jason Bourne in The Bourne Ultimatum (2007)
- First appearance: The Bourne Identity (1980)
- Created by: Robert Ludlum
- Portrayed by: Richard Chamberlain (1988 film); Matt Damon (film series)
- Voiced by: Jeffrey Pierce

In-universe information
- Full name: David Webb (real name); Jason Bourne (adopted name)
- Aliases: Delta One; John Michael Kane; Nicolas Lemanissier; Charles Briggs; George P. Washburn; Foma Kiniaev; Ащьф Лштшфум (Ashch'f Lshtshfum); Mr. Cruet; Paul Kay; Adam Stone; Gilberto Di Piento; Christopher Michaels
- Occupation: Literature: Foreign Service Officer; "Medusa" special operator; CIA assassin; Professor; In films: US Army Captain; US Army Special Forces; Delta Force; CIA assassin
- Spouses: Literature: Dao Webb (deceased); Marie St. Jacques (beginning with Supremacy; deceased before Betrayal); In films: Marie Kreutz (girlfriend then deceased in Supremacy)
- Children: Literature: Jamie Webb; Alison Webb; Joshua Webb (known as Khan in The Bourne Legacy); Alyssa Webb (deceased)
- Nationality: American

Jason Bourne (/bɔːrn/) is the titular character and the protagonist in a series of novels and subsequent film adaptations. The character was created by novelist Robert Ludlum. He first appeared in the novel The Bourne Identity (1980), which was adapted for television in 1988. The novel was adapted into a feature film of the same name in 2002 and starred Matt Damon in the lead role.

The character originally featured in three novels by Ludlum, released between 1980 and 1990, followed by eleven novels written by Eric Van Lustbader between 2004 and 2019, and seven novels by Brian Freeman since 2020, with his eighth novel (The Bourne Revenge) being released in early 2026. Along with the first feature film, Jason Bourne also appears in three sequel films The Bourne Supremacy (2004), The Bourne Ultimatum (2007), and Jason Bourne (2016), with Damon again in the lead role. Jeremy Renner stars in the fourth film of the franchise, The Bourne Legacy, released in August 2012. Damon stated in interviews that he would not do another Bourne film without Paul Greengrass, who had directed the second and third installments. Greengrass agreed to direct Damon in the fifth installment in the franchise. Greengrass jointly wrote the screenplay with editor Christopher Rouse.

== Literary backstory ==
Jason Bourne is one of many aliases used by David Webb, a career Foreign Service Officer, and a specialist in Far Eastern affairs. Before the events in The Bourne Identity, Webb had a Thai wife named Dao and two children named Joshua and Alyssa in Phnom Penh. Webb's wife and children were killed during the Vietnam War when a fighter plane strayed into Cambodia, dropped two bombs, and strafed a spot near the Mekong River. However, unknown to Webb, Joshua survived. Due to Cambodia's neutrality in the war, every nation disclaimed the plane, and, therefore, no one took responsibility for the incident. Enraged by both the injustice and randomness of his loss, Webb went to Saigon and, under the careful guidance of friend and CIA officer Alexander Conklin, ended up training for an elite top secret Special Forces unit called "Medusa". Within that select organization Webb was known only by his code name, "Delta One".

=== Medusa ===
An assassination team or death squad, Medusa, was created to infiltrate Northern Vietnam and assassinate members of the Viet Cong and its collaborators. Its members were criminals; its leader, a man called Delta, ran Medusa with an iron fist. He became well known for his ruthlessness, his disregard for orders, and his disturbing success rate on missions, resulting in the kidnapping of Webb's brother, U.S. Army Lieutenant Gordon Webb, during his tour of duty in Saigon.

During the mission to save Gordon Webb, an original "Medusa" team member named Jason Charles Bourne was discovered to be a double agent who alerted a large number of North Vietnamese soldiers to their whereabouts. When Delta found Bourne after killing his way through the North Vietnamese, he simply killed Bourne in the jungles of Tam Quan. Bourne's execution was never exposed due to the top secret status of Medusa.

=== Operation Treadstone ===
Years later, a black ops arm of the CIA, called "Treadstone Seventy-One" after a building on New York's Seventy-First Street, was formed to eliminate the notorious Carlos the Jackal. Webb was called up by David Abbott, nicknamed "The Monk", to be its principal agent. At this point, Webb (Delta) took the identity of Jason Bourne, due to the actual Bourne's status as MIA in the war, as well as the fact that Bourne was in reality a brutal killer with a long criminal record. The point was to turn "Jason Bourne" into an elite, ruthlessly efficient assassin who would be feared by terrorists and criminals worldwide. The assassin's alias was "Cain". The reasoning for creating such a myth was to create competition for the well-known assassin named "Carlos", or "Carlos the Jackal" (real name Ilich Ramírez Sánchez) who at that time was considered the world's best and most famous assassin. By creating this myth, Cain was to drive the reclusive Carlos out into the open "long enough to put a bullet in his head".

== Film backstory ==
In the film series, Jason Bourne is revealed to have been born David Webb on September 13, 1970 (or June 4, 1978 in Jason Bourne; but, that could have been the birth-date of the actual Bourne) in Nixa, Missouri (although in Ultimatum, he is given a false date of April 15, 1971, as a coded reference to a specific site). In flashbacks, he joins the United States Army Delta Force and is eventually selected for the CIA Treadstone program in 1997. His father, Richard Webb, a senior CIA analyst, is responsible for creating Treadstone, a black ops project intended to train and deploy elite assassins. The CIA murders his father with a false flag car bomb in Beirut in a bid to recruit Webb.

The ploy worked; Webb approaches the CIA and is brought into the program by Neal Daniels, a supervisor in the Treadstone program, while being monitored by Dr. Albert Hirsch, who supervises the medical assessment of Treadstone agents. He is brought into a secret recruitment center in New York City, where Hirsch orders him tortured for days — via waterboarding and sleep deprivation — to break his spirit and allow him to be molded into an assassin. He is officially accepted when he murders an unidentified man (implied to be the real Jason Bourne) without question. After that, he is given a new identity as Jason Bourne, and his true identity becomes a classified secret.

After heavy training, in which he learns several languages and masters a wide array of martial arts skills, Bourne is placed in the Treadstone program, whose missions are run by Conklin. His first assignment, an unofficial one, is revealed to have happened in Berlin, Germany: the assassination of Vladimir Neski, a Russian politician who was intending to expose the theft of $20 million in secret funds stolen from the CIA by Treadstone's Director, Ward Abbott, and a Russian oligarch, Yuri Gretkov. Under Conklin's orders, Bourne murders Neski and his wife and makes it look like a murder-suicide.

Bourne works in the program as its top agent for three years, stationed in Paris, France, maintaining a secluded life while performing assassinations, mostly around Europe. His official handler is logistics agent Nicky Parsons, also stationed in Paris, who is implied to have feelings for Bourne that she keeps hidden from Treadstone employers.

The turning point in his life comes after an order to murder Nykwana Wombosi, an exiled African warlord who was blackmailing the CIA into reinstating him as head of state, lest he expose several CIA secrets. Using an alias, John Michael Kane, Bourne gathers information on Wombosi. He infiltrates the warlord's yacht and hides inside it for five days, surfacing on a cold night in the middle of the Mediterranean Sea, intending to arrange the murder to look like Wombosi was killed by a crew member. However, Wombosi is surrounded by his children, and Bourne is unable to bring himself to kill him. He tries to abandon the mission by leaving the boat, but an unknown person shoots him twice in the back, sending him off the yacht into the sea and triggering amnesia, causing Webb / Bourne to forget his identity.

== Franchise overview ==
The Bourne franchise consists of several novels, movies, television series, a video game and a tourist attractions, all featuring one of the several versions of the Jason Bourne character.

- Robert Ludlum novels:
  - The Bourne Identity (1980)
  - The Bourne Supremacy (1986)
  - The Bourne Ultimatum (1990)
- Eric Van Lustbader novels:
  - The Bourne Legacy (2004)
  - The Bourne Betrayal (2007)
  - The Bourne Sanction (2008)
  - The Bourne Deception (2009)
  - The Bourne Objective (2010)
  - The Bourne Dominion (2011)
  - The Bourne Imperative (2012)
  - The Bourne Retribution (2013)
  - The Bourne Ascendancy (2014)
  - The Bourne Enigma (2016)
  - The Bourne Initiative (2017)
  - The Bourne Nemesis (cancelled)
- Brian Freeman novels:
  - The Bourne Evolution (2020)
  - The Bourne Treachery (2021)
  - The Bourne Sacrifice (2022)
  - The Bourne Defiance (2023)
  - The Bourne Shadow (2024)
  - The Bourne Vendetta (2025)
  - The Bourne Escape (2025)
  - The Bourne Revenge (2026)
- Films:
  - The Bourne Identity (1988 TV film)
  - The Bourne Identity (2002)
  - The Bourne Supremacy (2004)
  - The Bourne Ultimatum (2007)
  - The Bourne Legacy (2012)
  - Jason Bourne (2016)
- Television series:
  - Treadstone (2019)
- Video games:
  - The Bourne Conspiracy (2008)
- Tourist attractions:
  - The Bourne Stuntacular (2020)
