= Bourne (novel series) =

Series of spy novels by Robert Ludlum and others, featuring the character Jason Bourne

Bourne is a series of spy novels, originally written by American author Robert Ludlum, about the fictional spy Jason Bourne. Ludlum wrote the first three novels: The Bourne Identity (1980), The Bourne Supremacy (1986), and The Bourne Ultimatum (1990).

After Ludlum's death in 2001, Eric Van Lustbader continued the series with several additional novels expanding Bourne's story.

Van Lustbader stopped writing for the franchise in 2019, abandoning a planned novel titled The Bourne Nemesis.

Following Van Lustbader’s departure, the Robert Ludlum literary estate selected author Brian Freeman to continue the series. Freeman's first Bourne novel, The Bourne Evolution, was released in 2020.

== Jason Bourne ==
#	Title	Year	Author
1	The Bourne Identity	1980	Robert Ludlum†
2	The Bourne Supremacy	1986	Robert Ludlum†
3	The Bourne Ultimatum	1990	Robert Ludlum†
4	The Bourne Legacy	2004	Eric Van Lustbader
5	The Bourne Betrayal	2007	Eric Van Lustbader
6	The Bourne Sanction	2008	Eric Van Lustbader
7	The Bourne Deception	2009	Eric Van Lustbader
8	The Bourne Objective	2010	Eric Van Lustbader
9	The Bourne Dominion	2011	Eric Van Lustbader
10	The Bourne Imperative	2012	Eric Van Lustbader
11	The Bourne Retribution	2013	Eric Van Lustbader
12	The Bourne Ascendancy	2014	Eric Van Lustbader
13	The Bourne Enigma	2016	Eric Van Lustbader
14	The Bourne Initiative	2017	Eric Van Lustbader
15	The Bourne Evolution	2020	Brian Freeman
16	The Bourne Treachery	2021	Brian Freeman
17	The Bourne Sacrifice	2022	Brian Freeman
18	The Bourne Defiance	2023	Brian Freeman
19	The Bourne Shadow	2024	Brian Freeman
20	The Bourne Vendetta	2025	Brian Freeman
21	The Bourne Escape	2025	Brian Freeman
22	The Bourne Revenge	2026	Brian Freeman

== Connected series ==
=== Treadstone ===
#	Title	Year	Author
1	The Treadstone Resurrection	2020	Joshua Hood
2	The Treadstone Exile	2021	Joshua Hood
3	The Treadstone Transgression	2022	Joshua Hood
4	The Treadstone Rendition	2023	Joshua Hood

=== Blackbriar ===
#	Title	Year	Author
1	The Blackbriar Genesis	2022	Simon Gervais
2	The Blackbriar Deceit	2023 (cancelled by the Ludlum Estate)	Simon Gervais

== In other media ==
The Bourne Identity has been adapted into live action twice. The first adaptation was a 1988 television film starring Richard Chamberlain and Jaclyn Smith. The second adaptation was a 2002 feature film starring Matt Damon, which received critical acclaim and was a commercial success. It launched the Bourne film franchise, which includes five films, with the fifth installment released in July 2016.

A television series titled Treadstone, based on the book series and set in the same universe, premiered on October 15, 2019. Created by Tim Kring, the show explored the origin and operations of the covert Treadstone program. In May 2020, the series was canceled after one season.
