= Black hearts =

Black hearts may refer to:

- Black Hearts: One Platoon's Descent into Madness in Iraq's Triangle of Death
- Fly Black Hearts
- Black Hearts in Battersea
- Black Hearts (On Fire)
- Dawn of the Black Hearts

== See also ==
- Black Heart (disambiguation)
- Blackheart (disambiguation)
- * Black Hearts and Painted Guns: A Battalion's Journey into Iraq's Triangle of Death
