= Black Blade =

Black Blade may refer to:

- Black Blade (novel), a novel by Eric Van Lustbader
- "Black Blade" (song), a song by Blue Öyster Cult
