= List of number-one DVDs of 2005 (UK) =

== Chart history ==
Issue date	Number-one DVD
3 January	The Chronicles of Riddick
10 January	Hellboy
17 January	Collateral
24 January	The Bourne Supremacy
31 January	Dodgeball: A True Underdog Story
7 February	Shark Tale
14 February	Bambi
21 February	Bridget Jones: The Edge of Reason
28 February	Bridget Jones: The Edge of Reason
7 March	Alien vs Predator
14 March	The Incredibles
21 March	The Incredibles
28 March	The Incredibles
4 April	The Incredibles
11 April	The Incredibles
18 April	Without a Paddle
25 April	National Treasure
2 May	The Phantom of the Opera
9 May	The Phantom of the Opera
16 May	Meet the Fockers
23 May	Team America: World Police
30 May	Ocean's Twelve
6 June	Creep
13 June	The Aviator
20 June	Racing Stripes
27 June	Million Dollar Baby
4 July	Hitch
11 July	Constantine
18 July	The Magic Roundabout
25 July	The Magic Roundabout
1 August	Alexander
8 August	24 Season 4
15 August	Coach Carter
22 August	Sahara
29 August	XXX2: The Next Level
5 September	The Hitchhiker's Guide to the Galaxy
12 September	The Hitchhiker's Guide to the Galaxy
19 September	Robots
26 September	Sin City
3 October	Kingdom of Heaven
10 October	Little Britain Season 2
17 October	Batman Begins
24 October	Batman Begins
31 October	Star Wars: Episode III – Revenge of the Sith
7 November	Star Wars: Episode III – Revenge of the Sith
14 November	War of the Worlds
21 November	Charlie and the Chocolate Factory
28 November	Madagascar
5 December	Madagascar
12 December	Madagascar
19 December	Lee Evans: XL Tour 2005 Live
26 December	Wedding Crashers
