= W. D. Richter =

American screenwriter, film director and film producer

- Born: Walter Duch Richter; December 7, 1945 (age 80); New Britain, Connecticut, United States
- Education: Dartmouth College
- Occupations: Film director, producer, screenwriter

Walter Duch Richter (born December 7, 1945) is an American screenwriter, film director and film producer. He is best known for adapting Invasion of the Body Snatchers, directing The Adventures of Buckaroo Banzai Across the 8th Dimension and co-writing Big Trouble in Little China.

== Biography ==
Richter graduated from Dartmouth College and attended USC Film School. He began script writing for Hollywood in the 1970s. He wrote the comedy Slither (1973), followed by two similarly styled comedies, Peeper (1975) and Nickelodeon (1976). He branched into other genres starting with the 1970s remake of Invasion of the Body Snatchers.

He wrote scripts throughout the 1980s and 1990s. In the early 1980s, Richter formed his own production company (with producer Neil Canton), Canton/Richter, and directed The Adventures of Buckaroo Banzai Across the 8th Dimension. The film did poorly at the box office, and the company ended.

In 1981, he wrote a screenplay based on Eric Van Lustbader's novel The Ninja for Irvin Kershner to direct with Richard Zanuck and David Brown and 20th Century Fox to produce, which ultimately never got made. Richter continued to write screenplays however, and has since written Home for the Holidays and Stealth.

== Filmography ==
Year	Title	Director	Writer	Producer	Notes
1973	Slither	No	Yes	Yes	
1975	Peeper	No	Yes	No	
1976	Nickelodeon	No	Yes	No	
1978	Invasion of the Body Snatchers	No	Yes	No	
1979	Dracula	No	Yes	No	
1980	Brubaker	No	Yes	No	Nominated—Academy Award for Best Original Screenplay
1981	All Night Long	No	Yes	No	
1982	Hard Feelings	No	Yes	No	
1984	The Adventures of Buckaroo Banzai; Across the 8th Dimension	Yes	No	Yes	
1986	Big Trouble in Little China	No	Yes	No	
1991	Late for Dinner	Yes	No	Yes	
1993	Needful Things	No	Yes	No	
1995	Home for the Holidays	No	Yes	No	
2005	Stealth	No	Yes	No	
