= Bourne 5 =

Bourne 5 may refer to:

- Jason Bourne (film), (2016 film), the fifth film in the film franchise
- The Bourne Betrayal, (2005 novel), by Eric Van Lustbader; fifth novel in the novel series
