= Ansel Bourne =

American preacher and psychological case study (1826–1910)

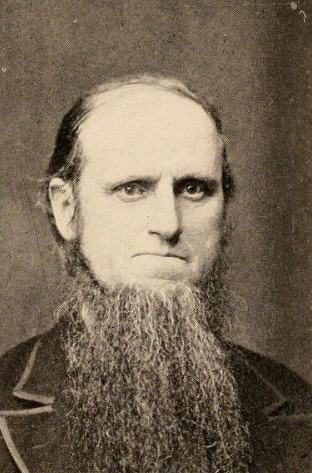
Ansel Bourne

Ansel Bourne (1826–1910) was a famous 19th-century psychology case due to his experience of a probable dissociative fugue. The case, among the first ever documented, remains of interest as an example of multiple personality and amnesia. Among the doctors who treated Bourne was William James.

Bourne was an evangelical preacher living in Rhode Island. He had become known slightly for his 1857 partial amnesia in which he was seized with the idea of visiting a chapel. Up to that point, he had been a carpenter. He published his experience in 1858.

On January 17, 1887, he went to Providence, Rhode Island, then continued on until he reached Norristown, Pennsylvania, where he set up shop as a stationer and confectioner using the name A. J. Brown. On Monday, March 14, he awakened in the morning not knowing where he was and with no memory of the preceding two months, still believing it was January.

After he was returned home with the assistance of his nephew, psychologist William James of Harvard University and Richard Hodgson of the Society for Psychical Research traveled to study him. Under hypnosis, they found, he could be induced to assume the personality of either Bourne or Brown, and neither personality had any knowledge of the other.

The story of Ansel Bourne was "most likely" an inspiration for the name 'Bourne' in the movie and novel series The Bourne Identity.

== Published works ==
- Wonderful works of God: a narrative of the wonderful facts in the case of Ansel Bourne, of Westerly, Rhode Island, who was suddenly struck blind, dumb and deaf and after eighteen days was suddenly and completely restored., 1858, M Cummings
