= The Testament (Lustbader novel) =

Novel by Eric Van Lustbader

- First edition
- Author: Eric Van Lustbader
- Language: English
- Genre: Thriller, Crime
- Publisher: Forge Books (Tor)
- Publication date: September 5, 2006
- Publication place: United States
- Media type: Print (hardcover, paperback)
- Pages: 480 pp (hardcover edition)
- ISBN: 0-7653-1463-0 (hardcover edition)
- OCLC: 63679951
- Dewey Decimal: 813/.54 22
- LC Class: PS3562.U752 T47 2006

The Testament is a 2006 thriller novel by Eric Van Lustbader.

== Plot summary ==
The book is about Braverman Shaw, whose father, Dexter Shaw, is killed by an explosion. After his death, Braverman, or Bravo to his friends, finds out that his father was a member of the Gnostic Observant, a group who possess a very old secret of Jesus Christ. Bravo has to find the secret and keep it hidden from their sworn enemies, the Knights of Saint-Clemens. His father left behind a maze, which Bravo has to solve to find the secret. During his journey, he is attacked by the Knights multiple times, and they are closer than he thinks.
