= Brian Freeman (psychological suspense author) =

American novelist

- Born: March 28, 1963 (age 63); Chicago, Illinois, U.S.
- Education: Carleton College
- Spouse: Marcia Freeman
- Writing career
- Genres: Crime fiction, Psychological suspense novel
- Notable awards: Macavity Awards, International Thriller Writers Awards
- Website: www.bfreemanbooks.com

Brian Freeman (born March 28, 1963) is an author of psychological suspense novels featuring Jonathan Stride and Serena Dial, and series featuring Cab Bolton and Frost Easton. He has also written novels in the Jason Bourne series after Robert Ludlum and Eric Van Lustbader.

In April 2021, Freeman sold the rights to his novel Infinite to Universal Pictures.

== Biography ==
Freeman was born in Chicago, Illinois. He attended Carleton College, where he graduated in 1984 with magna cum laude in English. Before becoming an author, Brian Freeman was a director of marketing and public relations at the international law firm of Faegre & Benson. He debuted in 2005 with his novel Immoral, which won the Macavity Award for Best First Novel and was a finalist for the Edgar Award. His books have been sold in 46 countries and are available in 17 languages. He credits his grandmother and his 8th-grade composition teacher for his success.

== Novels ==
Title here	Year	ISBN	Remarks
Immoral	2005	ISBN 978-0-312-93972-4	Jonathan Stride novel (book 1) Won the Macavity Award for Best First Novel. Nominated for the Anthony Award, Barry Award, Gold Dagger Award, and Edgar Allan Poe Award.
Stripped	2006	ISBN 978-0-312-34045-2	Jonathan Stride novel (book 2)
Stalked	2007	ISBN 0312363273	Jonathan Stride novel (book 3)
In the Dark	2008	ISBN 978-0-312-36329-1	Jonathan Stride novel (book 4) The United Kingdom version of this book is titled The Watcher
The Burying Place	2010	ISBN 978-0-312-53791-3	Jonathan Stride novel (book 5); Finalist 2011 Thriller Award For Best Novel
The Agency	2010	ISBN 978-0-312-61113-2	with Ali Gunn; as Ally O'Brien
The Bone House	2011	ISBN 978-0-312-56283-0	Cab Bolton novel (book 1)
Spilled Blood	2012	ISBN 978-1402798122	2013 International Thriller Award for Best Novel
Spitting Devil	2012	ASIN B07TV2WDW8	short story
The Cold Nowhere	2013	ISBN 978-0857383211	Jonathan Stride novel (book 6)
Turn to Stone	2014	ASIN B07TT5FFNY	Jonathan Stride novella (book 5.5)
Season of Fear	2015	ISBN 978-1623654078	Cab Bolton novel (book 2)
West 57	2015	ISBN 1515372804	as B.N. Freeman, self-published
Goodbye to the Dead	2016	ISBN 1623659116	Jonathan Stride novel (book 7)
Marathon	2017	ISBN 1681442418	Jonathan Stride novel (book 8)
The Night Bird	2017	ISBN 1503943569	Frost Easton novel (book 1)
Alter Ego	2018	ISBN 1681441292	Jonathan Stride novel (book 9)
The Voice Inside	2018	ISBN 1542049040	Frost Easton novel (book 2)
The Crooked Street	2019	ISBN 1681441292	Frost Easton novel (book 3)
Thief River Falls	2020	ISBN 1503900940	
Funeral For A friend	2020	ISBN 1982663723	Jonathan Stride novel (book 10)
The Deep, Deep Snow	2020	ISBN 1094071323	
The Bourne Evolution	2020	ISBN 0525542612	Jason Bourne book 15
Infinite	2021	ISBN 1542023866	
The Bourne Treachery	2021	ISBN 0593414179	Jason Bourne book 16
The Ursalina	2022	ISBN 979-8200911479	prequel to The Deep, Deep Snow
The Bourne Sacrifice	2022	ISBN 0593419855	Jason Bourne book 17
I Remember You	2022	ISBN 1542035082	
The Zero Night	2022	ISBN 1094082341	Jonathan Stride novel (book 11)
Where the Road Ends	2026	ISBN 979-8228368545	Jonathan Stride novel (book 12)
