= Slither (1973 film) =

1973 American comedy film by Howard Zieff

- Film poster
- Directed by: Howard Zieff
- Written by: W.D. Richter
- Produced by: Jack Sher
- Starring: James Caan; Peter Boyle; Sally Kellerman; Louise Lasser
- Cinematography: László Kovács
- Edited by: David Bretherton
- Music by: Tom McIntosh
- Distributed by: Metro-Goldwyn-Mayer
- Release date: March 7, 1973
- Running time: 96 minutes
- Country: United States
- Language: English
- Box office: $1,355,000 (US/ Canada rentals)

Slither is a 1973 American comedy thriller film directed by Howard Zieff and starring James Caan. Caan plays ex-convict Dick Kanipsia, one of several people trying to find a stash of stolen money. Peter Boyle and Sally Kellerman co-star. Slither was the first screenplay by W. D. Richter.

== Plot ==
Car thief Dick Kanipsia gets out on parole from a penitentiary. He intends to go straight, but first he goes to see an old friend Harry Moss, only to see Harry shot. The dying Harry tells Dick to find Barry Fenaka, who supposedly knows where to find a stash of stolen cash that Harry has hidden. Then Harry blows himself up with dynamite. As Dick flees the scene, a black van lurks in the trees.

Dick hitches a ride with Kitty Kopetzky, who appears as a friendly free spirit, but robs a diner where she and Dick go to eat. Dick flees during her robbery and catches a passing bus. Barry turns out to be a small-time bandleader. He explains to Dick that he and Harry embezzled $312,000, and paid Vincent Palmer to stash it for them. He and his wife Mary take Dick to get the money. They travel by car, with an Airstream Land Yacht in tow. At Palmer's office, they find a man named Marvin Hollenbeck who tells them that Palmer moved to Pismo Beach.

As they follow Palmer's trail, the group worries about the black camper van that seems to follow them. It is labelled Willow Camp for Boys and Girls. At the beach, Barry finds out that Palmer is now in Susanville. Kitty tracks Dick down and joins the crew. An identical black van joins the first, and when Barry disappears, Dick, Kitty and Mary become convinced that he is in one of the vans.

Dick, Kitty and Mary track the vans to a trailer camp. Upon approaching the black vans in the dark, four men jump Dick and beat him. He returns to the Airstream in pain with what Kitty believes to be a collapsed lung. Dick realizes his attackers are people he has encountered throughout the entire trip. Fearing he will be beaten again at the trailer park, Dick ducks into a bingo game and begins to play, then feigns leaving. He stops at the exit and turns around to see the four men that beat him standing up from their places at the bingo tables. Kitty arrives and sits next to Dick, who points out the four men. Kitty starts a brawl by sweeping the bingo markers off the card of a large man playing next to Dick's attackers, allowing Dick and Kitty to escape. One of the black vans leaves the camp in a hurry, and Dick pursues them. In the ensuing chase, the other black van catches up and drives Dick and the Airstream off the road. Dick creates a roadblock and forces the black van to crash into a waste pit.

In a shootout with one of the men from the van, Dick wounds his attacker and tracks him to a roadside vegetable stand. The wounded man is Hollenbeck, who confesses that he is really Palmer. He put all the money into the camp, but the location was not suitable, and the business failed. Barry arrives in a tow truck, revealing that he had simply gone for a tuna sandwich when Dick, Kitty and Mary thought he was abducted. He is thrilled to learn that the money was used to buy land. Dick walks away in disgust at the whole mess while Barry plots with Mary about how to make money off the land.

== Cast ==
- James Caan as Dick Kanipsia
- Peter Boyle as Barry Fenaka
- Sally Kellerman as Kitty Kopetzky
- Louise Lasser as Mary Fenaka
- Allen Garfield as Vincent J. Palmer/Marvin Hollenbeck
- Richard B. Shull as Harry Moss
- Alex Rocco as Ice Cream Man
- Diana Darrin as Singer
- Stuart Nisbet as Buddy
- Virginia Sale as Bingo Caller
- Alex Henteloff as Phone Booth Man
- Len Lesser as Jogger

== Production ==
James Caan later said of the film that was a role he "took because I needed money; there was nothing there."

== Reception ==
On the review aggregator website Rotten Tomatoes, 57% of 7 critics' reviews are positive. Variety wrote the film was "in effect, an excellent, live-action, feature-length counterpart to a great old Warner Bros. cartoon." Vincent Canby of The New York Times wrote that "I may have enjoyed Slither somewhat more than is warranted by the bright but inconsistent material." Roger Ebert awarded three stars out of four, writing, "What makes it goofy, and nice, is that little effort is made to explain things. They just sort of happen as our friends race down the road. What holds everything together is the nice sense of timing displayed by the director, Howard Zieff, who is the guy behind many of the best TV commercials these days." Gene Siskel of the Chicago Tribune gave the film 2.5 stars out of 4, writing that "too often the humor evaporates and we are left with an ensemble of fine actors creating memorable characters stuck with an essentially trivial story." Gary Arnold of The Washington Post called the film "pleasantly wacky and offbeat," with "a likably resilient quality. On several occasions one feels the comic situations failing or going slack, but invariably an inspired bit of business or fresh, witty situation will revive one's interest and snap the movie back into shape." Kevin Thomas of the Los Angeles Times described it as "a thoroughly infectious, delightfully wacky comedy" that "asks nothing of the viewer but to sit back and enjoy himself." Pauline Kael of The New Yorker called it "a suspense comedy that keeps promising to be a knockout entertainment; it never delivers, and it finally fizzles out, because the story idea isn't as good as the curlicues. But it has a pleasant slapstick temperament—a sort of fractured hipsterism."

== See also ==
- List of American films of 1973
