= Blackheart (disambiguation) =

Blackheart is a Marvel Comics character.

Blackheart may also refer to:

- Blackheart (album), a 2015 album by Dawn Richard
- Blackheart (plant disease), a non-parasitic fruit disease that causes rotting from the inside.
- Blackheart Beagle, a Disney character from the Donald Duck universe
- Blackheart Records, an American record label founded by rock musicians Joan Jett and Kenny Laguna

== See also ==
- Blackhearts, Joan Jett's backing band
- Black Heart
