= The Bourne Identity (1988 film) =

1988 American TV miniseries

- North American DVD release cover
- Genre: Drama; Action; Thriller
- Based on: The Bourne Identity by Robert Ludlum
- Teleplay by: Carol Sobieski
- Directed by: Roger Young
- Starring: Richard Chamberlain; Jaclyn Smith; Anthony Quayle; Donald Moffat; Denholm Elliott
- Music by: Laurence Rosenthal
- Country of origin: United States
- Original language: English

Production
- Executive producer: Alan Shayne
- Producer: Frederick Muller
- Cinematography: Tony Pierce-Roberts
- Editors: Ellen Ring Jacobson; Benjamin A. Weissman
- Running time: 185 minutes
- Production companies: Alan Shayne Productions; Warner Bros. Television

Original release
- Network: ABC
- Release: May 9 – May 10, 1988

The Bourne Identity is a 1988 American mystery action thriller miniseries adaptation of Robert Ludlum's 1980 novel The Bourne Identity. The adaptation was written by Carol Sobieski, directed by Roger Young for Warner Bros. Television with Richard Chamberlain in the title role, along with Jaclyn Smith. It follows the storyline of the original novel, with a run-time of 185 minutes; with commercials added, the running time was extended to four hours, and was first shown on ABC in two 120 minute installments over two nights, making its first run count as a miniseries rather than a TV movie. As such, it was nominated in the Outstanding Miniseries category at the 40th Primetime Emmy Awards.

The book was adapted again in 2002 by Doug Liman starring Matt Damon as Jason Bourne, launching the Bourne series of theatrical films, with considerable deviations from the original Cold War novel. It was followed later by a new series of Bourne bestsellers written by Eric Lustbader with the permission of the Ludlum estate.

== Plot ==
A man is shot twice on the deck of a ship, during a heavy storm at night. The injured man plunges into the Mediterranean Sea, eventually washing ashore in a fishing village off the coast of Southern France. Two fishermen take him to the local doctor, a retired surgeon, who nurses him back to health. He then discovers he has exceptional skills—fluency in multiple languages, combat prowess, and an ability to adapt to dangerous situations—but has no memory of his past and has amnesia after surviving a gunshot wound to the head. He’s a ghost in the machine, haunted by fragmented memories and nightmares, pursued by assassins.

A trail of clues, including a surgically implanted microfilm revealing a Swiss bank account number, leads him to Zurich. There, he discovers he has 15 million dollars and retrieves a large sum of money, multiple passports, and a name: Jason Bourne from a safety deposit box. However, he soon realizes this might not be his true identity.

Bourne teams up with Marie St. Jacques, a Canadian government economist he initially takes hostage but who becomes his ally and lover after he saves her life. Together, they evade a shadowy network of killers and uncover hints of Bourne's past tied to a mysterious company called Treadstone 71. As Bourne pieces together his history, he learns he may have been a United States government operative trained to eliminate a man known only as Carlos, a notorious international terrorist.

== Cast ==
- Richard Chamberlain as Jason Bourne
- Jaclyn Smith as Marie St. Jacques
- Anthony Quayle as Gen. François Villiers
- Donald Moffat as David Abbott
- Shane Rimmer as Alexander Conklin
- Yorgo Voyagis as Carlos
- Denholm Elliott as Dr. Geoffrey Washburn
- Peter Vaughan as Fritz Koenig
- Michael Habeck as The Fat Man
- Wolf Kahler as Gold Glasses
- Philip Madoc as D'Armacourt
- Bill Wallis as Chernak
- John Carlin as Stossel
- James Laurenson as Gillette
- Michael Mellinger as Bertinelli

== Differences from the book ==
The film exhibits some differences from the novel by Ludlum. The undercover identity of Jason Bourne is simplified to "Bourne" pursuing Carlos rather than using the code name "Cain". Alexander Conklin is killed by one of his own people when attempting to confront Bourne; in the novel he survives and appears in subsequent novels. In the book's ending, Carlos the Jackal escapes in the confusion, whereas in the film he is killed in the climactic battle with Bourne.

== Bibliography ==
- Tibbetts, John C., and James M. Welsh, eds. The Encyclopedia of Novels Into Film (2nd ed. 2005) pp 39–42.
