= Black Heart =

Black Heart may refer to:

- Uranothauma nubifer, an African butterfly also known as "black heart"

== Arts and entertainment ==
=== Books ===
- Black Heart (Lustbader novel), 1983
- Black Heart (Black novel), 2011

=== Music ===
- Black Heart (Kish Mauve album), 2009
- Black Heart (Within the Ruins album), 2020
- "Black Heart" (Stooshe song), 2012
- "Black Heart" (Stone Temple Pilots song), 2013
- "Black Heart", a song by Carly Rae Jepsen from Emotion, 2015

=== Video games ===
- Black Heart (video game), a 1991 video game

== See also ==
- Blackheart (disambiguation)
- hearts in Unicode
