= The Ninja (novel) =

1980 Eric Van Lustblader novel

- First edition
- Author: Eric Van Lustbader
- Language: English
- Genre: Thriller, Crime novel
- Publisher: M Evans & Co
- Publication date: April 1980
- Publication place: United States
- Media type: Print (Hardcover, Paperback)
- Pages: 442 pp (hardcover edition)
- ISBN: 0-87131-314-6 (hardcover edition)
- OCLC: 5830611
- Dewey Decimal: 813/.5/4
- LC Class: PZ4.L9696 Ni PS3562.U752

The Ninja novel was written in 1980 by Eric Van Lustbader and is a tale of revenge, love and murder. The author blends a number of known themes together: crime, suspense and Japanese martial arts mysticism. The book is divided into five parts, called "rings," as an apparent homage to Miyamoto Musashi's The Book of Five Rings.

The book became a New York Times Best Seller. In North America, it contributed to the popularization of ninjas in popular culture.

== Plot summary ==
It is initially set in Japan following the end of World War II and follows the story of Nicholas Linnear, a man raised by Anglo-Chinese parents.

As a youth, Linnear is introduced to the world of aikido, kenjutsu, and iai-jutsu at a local dojo of the Itto Ryu, also attended by his cruel and violent older cousin Saigō. Linnear is a natural and soon becomes adept, much to the annoyance of Saigō. During a training exercise Nicholas and Saigō duel, and Nicholas defeats him. Saigō is enraged and leaves, swearing revenge.

When they next meet, Saigō is a considerably more skilled martial artist than Linnear and defeats him quickly. It's revealed that Saigō has joined a Kuji-kiri ryu in order to learn black ninjutsu and has become a ninja.

Linnear himself soon becomes introduced to Aka i ninjutsu, or the red, ostensibly "good" side of ninjutsu, through the Tenshin Shoden Katori Shinto Ryu.

The ninjas are introduced not as magical or mythical beings, but rather as supreme martial artists who have reached the highest level and seek to progress further. It is suggested that, by becoming ninja, they strive to advance to an even higher plane, gaining skills such as haragei, or sensing the surrounding world in a different manner. However, this process is accompanied by a significant cost.

Many years later, Linnear has moved to America and leads a peaceful academic existence. After quitting his job in advertising, he meets a beautiful, if disturbed, woman called Justine, with whom he falls in love. This peace is shattered when a prominent local businessman is murdered in an extremely unusual manner (by a poisoned ninja shuriken). The local police are baffled and consult Nicholas, as he is known to be an authority on oriental studies. Linnear quickly realises that a ninja is the murderer and the next target is his new girlfriend's father, Raphael Tomkin, for whom he starts working as a bodyguard, although not without persuasion. Linnear also befriends Lew Croaker, a local detective.

Linnear's investigations reveal Saigō is the ninja, and this puts him on a deadly collision course with his older cousin.

== Unmade film adaptation ==
Originally in the 1980s, the rights to make a film adaptation were bought by producers Richard D. Zanuck and David Brown for 20th Century Fox to produce.

Irvin Kershner was hired to direct, using a screenplay written by W.D. Richter, which followed the novel very closely. Tom Cole was hired to write a draft, while Kershner himself also wrote a draft. Lustbader's choice for portraying Nicholas Linnear was Richard Gere, but it never got to that point. Kershner was later replaced by John Carpenter as new director. Carpenter co-wrote a second draft with Tommy Lee Wallace in 1983. Carpenter left the project after a year, as the project still had no workable script draft. Around this time, Joe Wizan, who had become the new head of Fox, put The Ninja and other projects that were green-lit into turnaround. This caused Zanuck and Brown to quit Fox and start working for Warner Bros.
