= The Bourne Supremacy =

1986 novel by Robert Ludlum

- First edition cover of The Bourne Supremacy
- Author: Robert Ludlum
- Language: English
- Series: Bourne Trilogy
- Genre: Thriller
- Publisher: Random House
- Publication date: February 11, 1986
- Publication place: United States
- Media type: Print (hardback & paperback)
- Pages: 597 pp (first edition)
- ISBN: 0-394-54396-3
- OCLC: 12371273
- Dewey Decimal: 813/.54 19
- LC Class: PS3562.U26 B68 1986
- Preceded by: The Bourne Identity
- Followed by: The Bourne Ultimatum

The Bourne Supremacy is the second Jason Bourne novel written by Robert Ludlum, first published in 1986. It is the sequel to Ludlum's bestseller The Bourne Identity (1980) and precedes Ludlum's final Bourne novel, The Bourne Ultimatum (1990).

The Bourne Supremacy gave its name to the second Bourne film, The Bourne Supremacy, starring Matt Damon in 2004; however, the movie adaptation has a completely different plot from the novel.

== Plot ==
Jason Bourne has recovered from most of his mental and physical injuries and is teaching Asian studies at a university in Maine under his real name of David Webb, living happily on campus with his wife Marie under supervision of psychiatrist Morris Panov.

Meanwhile, high-ranking U.S. officials Ambassador Raymond Havilland and Undersecretary Edward McAllister discuss an increasingly alarming situation in the People's Republic of China, where the popular Communist official Sheng Chou Yang is boosting his rise to power with assassinations perpetrated by someone impersonating Jason Bourne. They fear that Sheng, a fanatical nationalist, might trigger a war, and therefore want him to be found and killed. Webb would be ideal for this, but they plan to involve him indirectly owing to his mistrust of the U.S. government and Webb's deep-seated, emotional instability due to the loss of his first wife and children in Vietnam.

McAllister arrives and informs Webb of the assassin in Asia who is killing under the name of Jason Bourne. Webb is told he requires a more visible security force because someone wants him dead.

Soon thereafter, Marie is abducted by unknown people. Webb returns to the house, finds clues to her abduction, and immediately phones government officials, threatening to leak information about Treadstone and Medusa in an attempt to get assistance. He finds out information has been manipulated in order to make him seem crazy and delusional, and that his only course of action is to follow the instructions left by the kidnappers. He turns to the only person he thinks will be able to help him, Alexander Conklin, even though Conklin once tried to kill him. Conklin, now limping, is convinced there is government involvement but that they have lost control of the situation and the hired guns holding Marie are no longer in their control. Webb, who has transformed back into the persona of Jason Bourne, now has no choice but to go to Hong Kong and play out the scenario to get Marie back. In Hong Kong Bourne is led to a wealthy Tai-Pan who wants Webb to locate the impostor Jason Bourne because the impostor killed his wife; the Taipan is actually a British intelligence officer named Lin Wenzu collaborating with the CIA to make Bourne find the impostor. Bourne agrees, saying that if his wife is not heard from the very moment he returns, he will kill his nabbed impostor without a second thought. Lin Wenzu is later critically injured when he uncovers and kills traitors on his team passing information to Sheng.

Marie, held captive in a British hospital, fakes illness and escapes, taking refuge with Catherine Staples, a former colleague now employed at the Canadian consulate in Hong Kong. The duo went incognito to avoid the CIA and to find Webb. Unfortunately, Marie runs away from Staples thinking she has joined forces with her captors who want to take her back, and Staples gets killed by Sheng's men. Marie later contacts Conklin and Panov, who arrive in Hong Kong and confront McAllister and Havilland.

Webb, tracking the impostor Bourne on land, water and air, through Kowloon and Macau, encounters D'Anjou, alias Echo, another former Medusa operative, who is also tracking down the impostor Bourne, whom he had personally trained to be like Bourne. They join forces and track the impostor to mainland China, where they realise that a trap was laid by Sheng who was anticipating them following the impostor, and Echo is captured. Webb tracks him to a bird sanctuary at night, where Sheng Chou Yang is seen holding an open air conference with his rebel supporters and captured "traitors" to his cause, whom he is going to "judge", including Echo and the impostor Bourne. Echo is executed but not before he manages to delay Sheng and buy enough time for Bourne to mount a surprise attack on everyone. Amidst explosions, gunfire and killings, Webb captures the impostor Bourne, hijacks an empty charter plane and brings him to Kowloon. But in attempting to swap the impostor for Marie, he is misled by McAllister, as Marie is not with them as was agreed and still hidden by Conklin. Thinking Marie has been killed, an angry Webb now attacks and bombs Havilland's estate on Victoria Peak, where the impostor Bourne is killed and Webb nearly is as well, saved only by the timely arrival of Marie, Panov, and Conklin.

Webb and Marie learn he was selected because no one was more skilled and lethal, and Marie was abducted because Webb would have never agreed to the mission had the CIA told him the truth. Since Webb has now seen what Sheng is capable of and since Echo died for his sake, he decides to go back into the fray and kill Sheng. McAllister accompanies Webb, and during their search for Sheng, McAllister explains that he should be the one to kill Sheng, and Sheng will only trust McAllister for agreeing to rendezvous, and this has been McAllister's plan from the start. They fool Sheng into meeting with them, proposing to destroy the only copy of confidential documents that can expose him in return for money. The meeting between Sheng, Webb and McAllister takes place on the Chinese border with the assistance of Wong, a previous acquaintance of Bourne. During the meeting, McAllister sees that Sheng has already grabbed the confidential documents from Victoria Peak and is shot by Sheng before he can shoot the latter. But Webb arrives and stabs Sheng dead. Webb, McAllister, and Wong escape in Sheng's helicopter amidst gunfire.

In the end, it is shown that Lin Wenzu and McAllister have survived, Havilland commends McAllister for his acts of bravado, saying he will be promoted, Panov and Conklin have left for the U.S., and Webb and Marie have flown to Hawaii to rest.

== Publication history ==
- 1986, U.S., Random House ISBN 0-394-54396-3, Pub date February 11, 1986, Hardback.
- 1987, U.S., Bantam Books ISBN 0-553-26322-6, Pub date February 1, 1987, Paperback.
- 1986, UK, Grafton ISBN 0-246-12572-1 Pub date April 10, 1986, Hardback.
- 1987, UK, HarperCollins ISBN 0-553-17299-9, Pub date March 5, 1987, Paperback.
