= Blackheart (plant disease) =

Non-parasitic disease of the fruit of cultivated plants

- Common names: Blossom-end rot
- Causal agents: drought conditions or low calcium mineral content
- Hosts: fruits of cultivated plants
- Treatment: Watering or calcium-rich fertilizers

Blackheart is a non-parasitic disease of the fruit of cultivated plants, such as tomatoes, that causes them to rot from the inside. External signs of the disease may or may not be present. The internal blackening develops in plants exposed to environmental pathology such as drought conditions or poor soil.

== Blossom-end rot ==
Blossom-end rot is another sign of plant disease that may accompany blackheart in the same plant. A black rot originates opposite the stem area of the plant fruit (the "blossom-end"), and spreads over the fruit as a dark, hardened area. The causes of blossom-end rot and blackheart are the same.

== Causes and treatment ==
The most common cause of blossom-end rot and/or blackheart is exposure to a prolonged hot, or drought period. These plant pathologies may also be caused by an extremely low calcium mineral content in the soil.

Plant fruit that is afflicted by either blossom-end rot or blackheart should be picked and discarded, leaving the healthy fruit on the plant. While the condition is not contagious and it will not spread from fruit to fruit, removing affected fruit will enable the plant to concentrate strength towards the healthier parts of the plant. Additional water should be added to a plant suffering from the effects of a hot, dry spell. If low calcium in the soil is the cause, this can be treated with calcium-rich fertilizers, such as gypsum, limestone, or ground eggshells.
