= The Bourne Supremacy (film) =

2004 action film by Paul Greengrass

- Theatrical release poster
- Directed by: Paul Greengrass
- Screenplay by: Tony Gilroy
- Based on: The Bourne Supremacy by Robert Ludlum
- Produced by: Frank Marshall; Patrick Crowley; Paul L. Sandberg
- Starring: Matt Damon; Franka Potente; Brian Cox; Julia Stiles; Karl Urban; Gabriel Mann; Joan Allen
- Cinematography: Oliver Wood
- Edited by: Christopher Rouse; Richard Pearson
- Music by: John Powell
- Production companies: Universal Pictures; The Kennedy/Marshall Company; Ludlum Entertainment
- Distributed by: Universal Pictures (North America); United International Pictures (International)
- Release dates: July 15, 2004 (ArcLight Hollywood); July 23, 2004 (United States)
- Running time: 108 minutes
- Country: United States
- Language: English
- Budget: $75–85 million
- Box office: $311 million

The Bourne Supremacy is a 2004 American action thriller film directed by Paul Greengrass and written by Tony Gilroy. Loosely based on the novel of the same name (Note: Although the film utilizes the title of the novel, its plot is entirely different.) and a sequel to The Bourne Identity (2002), the film stars Matt Damon as Jason Bourne, a former CIA assassin suffering from psychogenic amnesia trying to learn more of his past when he is enveloped in a conspiracy involving the CIA and Treadstone. Joan Allen, Franka Potente, Brian Cox, Julia Stiles, Karl Urban, and Gabriel Mann also star.

Following the success of the first film, Greengrass was hired to replace Doug Liman as the director of the sequel after the producers were impressed by his work on Bloody Sunday (2002). The film premiered at ArcLight Hollywood on July 15, 2004, and was theatrically released in the United States on July 23 by Universal Pictures. It received positive reviews and was a commercial success, grossing $311 million on a $75–85 million budget. A sequel, The Bourne Ultimatum, was released in 2007.

== Plot ==
Two years after the incident in Paris, (Note: As depicted in The Bourne Identity (2002)) Jason Bourne and his girlfriend Marie Kreutz are living in exile in Goa. Still suffering from amnesia, he documents flashbacks about his life as a CIA assassin in a notebook. In Berlin, a CIA agent working for Counter-Intelligence Supervisor (Note: She decribes herself as "Pamela Landy, CI (Counter-Intelligence) Supervisor".) Pamela Landy is paying $3 million to an unnamed Russian source for the Neski files, documents on the theft of $20 million seven years prior. The deal is interrupted by Kirill, a Russian Federal Security Service agent who works for oligarch Yuri Gretkov. He kills the agent and source, steals the files and money, and plants fingerprints framing Bourne for the attack.

After finding Bourne's fingerprint, Landy asks Section Chief Ward Abbott about Operation Treadstone, the defunct CIA program to which Bourne belonged. She tells Abbott that the CIA agent who stole the $20 million was named in the Neski files. Some years ago, Russian politician Vladimir Neski was about to identify the thief when he was killed by his wife in a suspected murder-suicide in Berlin. Landy believes that Bourne and Treadstone's late supervisor, Alexander Conklin, were involved and that Bourne killed the Neskis. Gretkov directs Kirill to Goa to kill Bourne, who flees with Marie; Kirill follows and kills her, unaware that they switched seats in the midst of the chase. Bourne leaves Goa and travels to Naples, where he allows himself to be identified by security. He subdues a Diplomatic Security agent and copies the SIM card from the former's cell phone. From the subsequent phone call, he learns about Landy and the frame job.

Bourne goes to Munich to visit Jarda, the only other remaining Treadstone operative. Jarda informs him Treadstone was shut down after Conklin's death, then attacks him; Bourne strangles him to death, before destroying his home in a gas explosion as agents move in. Bourne follows Landy and Abbott to Berlin as they meet former Treadstone support technician Nicky Parsons to question her about Bourne. Bourne believes the CIA is hunting him again and calls Landy from a nearby roof. He demands a meet-up with Nicky and indicates to Landy that he can see her in the office. Bourne kidnaps Nicky in Alexanderplatz and learns from her that Abbott had been Conklin's boss. He releases her after she reveals she knows nothing about the mission. Bourne then visits the hotel where the killing took place and recalls more of his mission: he killed Neski on Conklin's orders, and when Neski's wife showed up, he shot her and made it look like a murder-suicide.

Danny Zorn, Conklin's former assistant, finds inconsistencies in the report of Bourne's involvement with the death of the agent and explains his theory to Abbott. Abbott then kills Zorn to prevent him from informing Landy. Bourne breaks into Abbott's hotel room and records a conversation between him and Gretkov that incriminates them in the theft of the $20 million. When confronted, Abbott admits to Bourne that he stole the money, ordered Kirill to retrieve the files, and had Bourne framed before arranging for him to be silenced in Goa. Abbott expects Bourne to kill him, but Bourne refuses, saying Marie would not want him to, and puts a gun on the table and leaves. Landy confronts Abbott about her suspicions and he commits suicide; later, she finds an envelope containing the tape of Abbott's conversations with Gretkov and Bourne in her hotel room.

Bourne travels to Moscow to find Neski's daughter, Irena. Kirill, tasked once again by Gretkov with killing Bourne, finds and wounds him. Bourne flees in a stolen taxi and Kirill chases him. Bourne forces Kirill's vehicle into a concrete divider, and leaves behind a seriously wounded Kirill, as Gretkov is arrested with Landy watching in the background. Bourne locates Irena and confesses to murdering her parents, apologizing to her as he leaves.

Later in New York City, Bourne calls Landy. She thanks him for the tape, reveals his original name, David Webb, and his date and place of birth, and asks him to meet her. Bourne, who is watching her from a building tells her she looks tired and to get some rest, as he disappears into the city.

== Cast ==
- Matt Damon as Jason Bourne, a former assassin in the CIA's Operation Treadstone who suffers from psychogenic amnesia.
- Franka Potente as Marie Kreutz, Bourne's girlfriend.
- Brian Cox as Ward Abbott, a corrupt CIA Section Chief and Director of Operations (Note: Identified as such in The Bourne Ultimatum.) who formerly directed Treadstone.
- Julia Stiles as Nicky Parsons, a CIA agent brought from her post-Treadstone assignment to assist in the search for Bourne.
- Karl Urban as Kirill, a corrupt Russian Federal Security Service assassin.
- Gabriel Mann as Danny Zorn, a CIA analyst for Treadstone who is now assigned to Abbott's staff.
- Joan Allen as Pamela Landy, the CIA Deputy Director.
- Marton Csokas as Jarda, a former Treadstone assassin.
- Karel Roden as Yuri Gretkov, Kirill's employer.
- Tomas Arana as Martin Marshall, the CIA Director.
- Tom Gallop as Tom Cronin, Landy's second-in-command agent
- Tim Griffin as John Nevins, a CIA agent at the U.S. Consulate in Naples.
- Michelle Monaghan as Kim.
- Ethan Sandler as Kurt.
- John Bedford Lloyd as Teddy.
- Oksana Akinshina appears as Irena Neski.

Chris Cooper reprises his role as Alexander Conklin in an uncredited flashback sequence.

== Production ==
The producers replaced Doug Liman, who directed The Bourne Identity. This was mainly due to the difficulties Liman had with the studio when making the first film, and their unwillingness to work with him again. British director Paul Greengrass was selected to direct the film after the producers saw Bloody Sunday (2002), Greengrass' depiction of the Bloody Sunday shootings in Northern Ireland, at Gilroy's suggestion. Producer Patrick Crowley liked Greengrass' "sense of the camera as [a] participatory viewer", a visual style Crowley thought would work well for The Bourne Supremacy. The film was shot in reverse order of its settings: some portions of the car chase and the film's ending were shot in Moscow, then most of the rest of the film was shot in and around Berlin, and the opening scenes in Goa, India were filmed last.

Initially, the film ended with Bourne collapsing after meeting the Neskis' daughter and later having a conversation with Landy in a hospital room. Two weeks before the film was to premiere, Greengrass and Damon (with the help of an uncredited George Nolfi) devised an alternate ending—the phone conversation in New York between Landy and Bourne—and the producers agreed to shoot it. The film tested better with the new ending and it was included in the final release.

The special visual effects were produced by Industrial Light & Magic (ILM).

== Release ==
=== Home media ===
The film was released on VHS and DVD by Universal Pictures Home Entertainment on December 7, 2004.

== Reception ==
=== Box office ===
The Bourne Supremacy grossed $176.1 million domestically (United States and Canada) and $134.9 million in other territories, for a worldwide total of $311 million, against a budget of $75 million. Released Jul 23, 2004, it opened at No. 1. It spent eight of its first nine weeks in the Top 10 at the domestic box office.

=== Critical response ===
On the review aggregator website Rotten Tomatoes, 81% of 194 critics' reviews are positive, with an average rating of 7.2/10. The website's consensus reads: "A well-made sequel that delivers the thrills." Metacritic, which uses a weighted average, assigned the film a score of 73 out of 100, based on 39 critics, indicating "generally favorable" reviews. Audiences polled by CinemaScore gave the film an average grade of "A−" on an A+ to F scale.

Roger Ebert of the Chicago Sun-Times gave the film 3 out of 4 stars, writing that it "treats the material with gravity and uses good actors in well-written supporting roles [that] elevates the movie above its genre, but not quite out of it."

=== Accolades ===
At the 2005 Taurus World Stunt Awards, veteran Russian stunt coordinator Viktor Ivanov and Scottish stunt driver Gillie McKenzie won the "Best Vehicle" award for their driving in the Moscow car chase scene. Dan Bradley, the film's second unit director won the overall award for stunt coordinator. The film ranks 454th on Empire's 2008 list of the 500 greatest movies of all time.

Year	Organization	Award	Category	Recipient	Result
2005	ASCAP Film and Television Music Awards	ASCAP Award	Top Box Office Films	John Powell	Won
2005	Academy of Science Fiction, Fantasy and Horror Films, USA	Saturn Award	Best Actor	Matt Damon	Nominated
2005	Broadcast Film Critics Association	Critics Choice Award	Best Popular Movie		Nominated
2005	Cinema Audio Society Awards	C.A.S. Award	Outstanding Achievement in Sound Mixing for Motion Pictures		Nominated
2005	Edgar Allan Poe Awards	Edgar	Best Motion Picture Screenplay		Nominated
2005	Empire Awards, UK	Empire Award	Best Actor	Matt Damon and Best Film	Won
2005	Empire Awards, UK	Empire Award	Best British Director of the Year	Paul Greengrass	Nominated
2005	London Critics Circle Film Awards	ALFS Award	Best British Director	Paul Greengrass	Nominated
2005	London Critics Circle Film Awards	ALFS Award	Scene of the Year	The Moscow Car Chase Sequence	Nominated
2005	MTV Movie Award	MTV Movie Award	Best Action Sequence	The Moscow Car Chase	Nominated
2005	MTV Movie Award	MTV Movie Award	Best Male Performance	Matt Damon	Nominated
2005	Motion Picture Sound Editors, USA	Golden Reel Award	Best Sound Editing in Domestic Features – Dialogue & ADR and Best Sound Editing in Domestic Features - Sound Effects and Foley		Nominated
2005	People's Choice Awards, USA	People's Choice Award	Favorite Movie Drama		Nominated
2005	Teen Choice Award	Teen Choice Award	Choice Movie Actor: Action	Matt Damon	Nominated
2005	Teen Choice Award	Teen Choice Award	Choice Movie: Action		Nominated
2005	USC Scripter Award	USC Scripter Award		Tony Gilroy (Screenwriter) and Robert Ludlum (Author)	Nominated
2005	World Soundtrack Award	World Soundtrack Award	Best Original Soundtrack of the Year — John Powell and Soundtrack Composer of the Year — John Powell		Nominated
2005	World Stunt Awards	Taurus Award	Best Stunt Coordinator or 2nd Unit Director	Dan Bradley	Won
2005	World Stunt Awards	Taurus Award	Best Work with a Vehicle	Viktor Ivanov, Gillie McKenzie	Won
2005	World Stunt Awards	Taurus Award	Best Fight	Darrin Prescott and Chris O'Hara	Nominated
