= Black Blade (novel) =

1992 novel by Eric Van Lustbader

- Author: Eric Van Lustbader
- Language: English
- Genre: Thriller novel
- Publisher: HarperCollins
- Publication date: July 1992
- Publication place: United States
- Media type: Print (hardcover)
- Pages: 464 pp
- ISBN: 0-00-223930-2
- OCLC: 26633263

Black Blade is a thriller novel written by Eric Van Lustbader. It was published in 1992.

== Plot summary ==
In New York City, a series of murders begin. In Washington, a plot conceived at the highest levels of American government is at work to bring the nation of Japan to its knees. In Tokyo, a power struggle is nearing its final stages for control of the Black Blade Society, an ostensibly political cabal whose motives may encompass far more than politics.

== Editions ==
Black Blade: A Novel (paperback), Fawcett Crest Books, ISBN 0-449-22287-X
