= Black Heart (Lustbader novel) =

1983 novel by Eric Van Lustbader

- First edition (publ. M. Evans & Co.)
- Author: Eric Van Lustbader
- Language: English
- Publisher: M. Evans & Co.
- Publication date: 1983
- ISBN: 0-87131-395-2 (first edition)
- Dewey Decimal: 813.54
- LC Class: PS3562.U752 B5

Black Heart is a 1983 novel by Eric Van Lustbader, which makes some reference to the 1960s rise of the Khmer Rouge.
