= The Bourne Initiative =

2017 novel by Eric Van Lustbader

- Author: Robert Ludlum (series creator); Eric Van Lustbader
- Language: English
- Series: Jason Bourne
- Genre: Spy, thriller
- Publisher: Grand Central Publishing (US)
- Publication date: June 13, 2017
- Publication place: United States
- Media type: Print (hardback)
- Pages: 400 Pages pp (first edition)
- ISBN: 1455597988
- Preceded by: The Bourne Enigma

The Bourne Initiative is the fourteenth novel in the Bourne series and eleventh and final by Eric Van Lustbader. The book was released on June 13, 2017, as a sequel to The Bourne Enigma.

== Reception ==
Publishers Weekly commented: "No one is what they seem, and the endless deceptions reliably lead to the extravagant action scenes that are Lustbader’s hallmark. Series fans will eagerly await Bourne’s next adventure."
