= The Bourne Sanction =

2008 novel by Eric Van Lustbader

- The Bourne Sanction first edition cover
- Author: Robert Ludlum (series creator); Eric Van Lustbader
- Language: English
- Series: Jason Bourne
- Genre: Spy, thriller
- Publisher: Grand Central Publishing
- Publication date: July 29, 2008
- Publication place: United States
- Media type: Print (hardback)
- Pages: 496 pp (first edition)
- ISBN: 0-446-53986-4
- OCLC: 223107176
- Dewey Decimal: 813/.54 22
- LC Class: PS3562.U752 R65 2008
- Preceded by: The Bourne Betrayal
- Followed by: The Bourne Deception

The Bourne Sanction is the title of Eric Van Lustbader's third Jason Bourne novel, and the sixth novel in the Bourne series created by Robert Ludlum. It was released on July 29, 2008, following Lustbader's The Bourne Betrayal that was published in 2007.

== Plot introduction ==
In the prologue, four prisoners at High Security Prison Colony 13, in Nizhny Tagil, Russia, attack Borya Maks and try to kill him. Leonid Danilovich Arkadin, member of the Kazanskaya who appears on scene disguised as a guard, neutralizes the attackers prior to leading Borya into a corridor where, quite ironically, Maks meets his demise. Leonid Danilovich is an assassin sanctioned to kill Borya Maks by Pyotr Zilber. As Arkadin returns to Campione d'Italia, where Zilber pays him for a job well done. Pyotr then discusses another prospective target by the name of Semion Icoupov. Zilber, unaware that Icoupov is Arkadin's real boss, is subsequently kidnapped by Leonid. He awakens in a room with Semion Icoupov and Leonid Arkadin standing by. The two men begin to extract information out of him but are brought up short when he kills himself with a hidden tab of cyanide. Arkadin's next mission is to Sevastopol to get possession of a document that is vitally important to the successful execution of a terrorist act on United States soil.

== Plot summary ==
At the beginning of the book, Bourne is at Georgetown University talking with Moira Trevor. Moira Trevor wants Bourne to be the head of security at their new liquid natural gas terminal in Long Beach, California. Meanwhile, Veronica Hart, a woman determined to get the job as Director of Central Intelligence, is on her way to the Oval Office to meet with the President of the United States, Luther LaValle (Pentagon intelligence czar), and United States Army General Richard P. Kendall.

Whilst at a restaurant with Moira, Bourne senses somebody watching him. He has Moira surreptitiously call him on his phone, leaves the restaurant and waits for his enemy to appear. That failing, Bourne goes back into the restaurant to join Moira. He gradually realizes that it is Moira who is the one being followed.

Luther LaValle, Rob Batt and General Kendall are hatching a conspiracy amongst their triumvirate to get Veronica Hart sacked. They want her out of her job as soon as possible. When Bourne and his academic mentor, Dominic Specter, meet in a library, Specter tells Bourne of Pyotr Zilber and his death. Zilber, it is revealed, was a former student of Specter's at Georgetown University. Specter reveals to Bourne that he is a terrorist hunter as well as an academic and would like Jason to go after Semion Icoupov.

In Europe, Jason's investigation into the Black Legion turns into one of the deadliest and most tangled operations of his double life: the pursuit of the leader of a murderous terrorist group with roots in the darkest days of World War II. During all of this Leonid Arkadin, who is just as talented as, but even more damaged than Bourne, is getting closer by the minute. While Bourne thinks he is getting closer to Arkadin, Arkadin thinks he's getting closer to Bourne.

Bourne goes to Moscow using information provided by Professor Specter. He is followed by many people sent in pursuit of him because of intercepted information. Bourne checks into the Metrtopolya Hotel with a girl named Gala. His arrival is expected by many. The taxi driver, Yakov, is paid by a man named Harris Low to drop him off at the hotel. Yakov is a poor man with an unpleasant past who does what he must to survive. Meanwhile, in the hotel, Bourne wrestles with and garottes a phony waiter (agent Anthony Prowess) after dodging his blade. As he exits the room he finds a blood trail that leads to the closet where Prowess had executed a man also sent to trail Bourne.

Meanwhile, Soraya and Tyrone are meeting with Luther LaValle and General Kendall. Tyrone and Soraya are to meet with them because LaValle and Kendall believe they are getting intel on the Black Legion. Tyrone leaves to finish what he, Soraya and a woman named Kiki are there for. He gets caught and is thrown into a cell. LaValle and Kendall leave Tyrone's life up to Soraya. She must trade Hart for Tyrone. But what LaValle did not know was that Hart was gathering intel that Rob Batt has been gathering ever since he was fired for being a mole.

In Moscow, Bourne meets with Dimitri Maslow, who vaguely tells him about Arkadin's life. After the meeting Bourne calls Specter. Specter reveals that Pyotr Zilber was his son and a member of the Black Legion. Bourne knows what Arkadin is capable of doing and is going to go after Specter's last man, Kirsch. Later on when Bourne is in a museum in Munich he leaves Kirsch behind a statue. When he returns he finds him lying there with a bullet through his head. He meets Jens, one of the men Specter sent to give his apartment to Bourne. The pair leaves the building and Semion Icoupov rides up and shoots Jens point blank outside the museum.

Escaping the mayhem in the State Museum in Sheremetyevo, Bourne and Petra, a security guard paid to shoot Kirsch, visit Herr Pelz, an older man that Petra knew when she was a child. He helped her in Dachau, where she grew up. "Old" Pelz tells Bourne more information about the Black Legion. Bourne shows Pelz a picture and asks him if he can identify the people in it. Pointing to the picture of Professor Specter he says "Damn, I'd swear this one is Asher Sever." He told Bourne that Sever's dad, Ibrahim, killed Semion Icoupov's father. For that Icupouv executed Ibrahim. The brothers hated each other and wanted the other one killed.

After being dropped off at Kirsch's apartment by Petra, Bourne finds a tiny transmitter planted on his passport. The door bells rings and it is Semion Icoupov. A couple of minutes later Arkadin blasts through the window with Devra coming in the back way and armed as well. Icoupov shoots Devra in the chest, but she then manages to shoot him in the shoulder, and he runs out of the house escaping to a rooftop. Arkadin then catches up with Server and Icoupov in their Mercedes and executes them in cold blood with a SIG Sauer Mosquito.

Bourne jumps out a helicopter onto the Moon of Hormuz (the tanker), following Arkadin. Bourne and Arkadin team up (or at least Bourne thinks so) to find Sever's man on board with the Black Legion symbol. Once Moira kills the doctor---Sever's man---Bourne comes down in the lower room because the captain told him that she was down there. As he comes up Arkadin lunges at him with a knife aiming at Bourne's stomach. After a long fight, Arkadain goes overboard with a twelve-story drop, plunging into the frigid water below.

Back at the hospital where Asher Sever (who we find out is Dominic Specter) is on life support, Bourne meets Willard, the chef at the National Security Agency (NSA) safe house. There Willard tells him that Arkadin was a member of Treadstone. Conklin knew Icoupov and they agreed it would be good to train Arkadin because he had the drive and nothing to lose. In the end, however, Jason Bourne was the superior asset.

== Reception ==
Joe Hartlaub reviewed the book for the Bookreporter and spoke highly of the author's contribution to the Bourne series calling it "is a thrill-a-minute work." Hartlaub also stated that Lustbader is "one of the best at creating believable and extremely dangerous villains who are the equal."

== See also ==
- Audio book review.
- Joe Hartlaub.
