= The Bourne Ascendancy =

2014 novel by Eric Van Lustbader

- Author: Robert Ludlum (Series creator); Eric Van Lustbader
- Language: English
- Series: Jason Bourne
- Genre: Spy, thriller
- Publisher: Grand Central Publishing (US)
- Publication date: June 10, 2014
- Publication place: United States
- Media type: Print (hardback)
- Pages: 454 Pages pp (first edition)
- ISBN: 1455577537
- Preceded by: The Bourne Retribution
- Followed by: The Bourne Enigma

The Bourne Ascendancy is the twelfth novel in the Bourne series and ninth by Eric Van Lustbader. It was released on May 22, 2014, as a sequel to The Bourne Retribution and was followed by The Bourne Enigma.

== Plot summary ==
Bourne has been hired to impersonate a high-level government minister at a political summit meeting in Qatar, shielding the minister from any assassination attempts. Suddenly, armed gunmen storm the room, killing everyone but Bourne. Their target, however, isn't the minister Bourne impersonates, but is Bourne himself.

Kidnapped and transported to an underground bunker, Bourne finds himself face-to-face with an infamous terrorist named El Ghadan (“Tomorrow”). El Ghadan holds as his captive Soraya Moore, former co-director of Treadstone, and a close friend to Bourne, along with her two-year-old daughter.

Meanwhile, the President of the United States is in the midst of brokering a historic peace treaty between the Israelis and the Palestinians, an event that El Ghadan is desperate to prevent. He demands that Bourne carry out a special mission: kill the President. If Bourne refuses, Soraya and her daughter will die.

Bourne must make a monstrous choice: save Soraya and her daughter, or save the President.

== Reception ==
Sidney Williams of The Big Thrill commented, "Ascendancy adds an important layer to the Bourne canon, and I'm very proud of this. During the course of the story, we learn so much more about Bourne, the person, than we ever have before."
