= The Bourne Objective =

2010 novel by Eric Van Lustbader

- The Bourne Objective American hardback edition
- Author: Robert Ludlum (series creator); Eric Van Lustbader
- Language: English
- Series: Jason Bourne
- Genre: Spy, thriller
- Publisher: Orion Books (UK); Grand Central Publishing (US)
- Publication date: May 27, 2010 (UK); June 1, 2010 (US)
- Publication place: United States
- Media type: Print (hardback & paperback), audiobook
- Pages: 448 pp (first edition)
- ISBN: 978-1-4091-0163-5
- Preceded by: The Bourne Deception
- Followed by: The Bourne Dominion

The Bourne Objective is the eighth novel in the Bourne series and fifth by Eric Van Lustbader. The book was released on June 1, 2010, as a sequel to The Bourne Deception. This novel continues very shortly after the end of Deception, with Bourne in a race against his nemesis, Leonid Arkadin, to unlock the potential mystery of King Solomon's Gold, while fighting Russian mercenaries, assassins sent by the U.S. government, and confronting a mysterious organization that threatens to take over and run the world.

== Reception ==
For the Bookreporter, Ray Palen, commends the author stating that: "the last few chapters will have readers gasping for breath. It is reassuring to know that, in the able hands of Eric Van Lustbader, Jason Bourne is alive and well and continuing to search for the truth to his own existence and overall purpose."
