= The Bourne Betrayal =

2007 novel by Eric Van Lustbader

- The Bourne Betrayal first edition cover
- Author: Robert Ludlum (Series creator); Eric Van Lustbader
- Language: English
- Series: Jason Bourne
- Genre: Spy, thriller
- Publisher: Grand Central Publishing
- Publication date: June 5, 2007
- Publication place: United States
- Media type: Print (hardback & paperback)
- Pages: 496 pp (first edition)
- ISBN: 0-446-58037-6
- OCLC: 81861474
- Dewey Decimal: 813/.54 22
- LC Class: PS3562.U752 R635 2007
- Preceded by: The Bourne Legacy
- Followed by: The Bourne Sanction

The Bourne Betrayal is the title for the novel by Eric Van Lustbader and the fifth novel in the Jason Bourne series created by Robert Ludlum. It was published in June 2007. It is Lustbader's second Bourne novel, following The Bourne Legacy that was published in 2004. Lustbader has written a sequel to The Bourne Betrayal titled The Bourne Sanction.

== Prologue ==
In the prologue, CIA Deputy Director Martin Lindros is in Ras Dejen, the tallest peak in the Semien mountain range, tracking major shipments of yellowcake uranium and atomic bomb weaponry. Lindros is then kidnapped by the terrorist leader, Fadi, one of the leaders of Dujja. Fadi's real name is Abu Ghazi Hadir al-Jamuh ibn Hamid ibn Ashef al-Wahhib. His brother, Karim al-Jamil and he are the leaders of Dujja.

== Plot summary ==
At the beginning of the book, Bourne is in Doctor Sunderland's office. Sunderland, recommended by Lindros, is a specialist in memory restoration and miniaturization. Unfortunately for Bourne, he doesn't know that this man posing as Sunderland is actually Costin Veintrop, hired by Fadi to mess with Bourne's brain by creating new memories. These new memories can be evoked by new smells or even hearing things. As Bourne exits the office two things happen: Veintrop calls Fadi and tells him the work is done, and Bourne receives a call that Martin is missing. He then catches a cab and heads back to the CIA headquarters to talk to the Old Man.

Back at the CIA, Bourne is introduced to a number of new people: Matthew Lerner (the Deputy Director until Lindros gets back), Soraya Moore (a senior case officer), Hiram Cevik (a prisoner, actually Fadi in disguise), and Tim Hytner (who is framed as a traitor to the CIA organization). Tim is working on cracking a cipher created by Fadi. Unwittingly Bourne brings Cevik out of his prison cage to take a walk with him in an attempt to extract more information about Fadi. Then Cevik escapes under the cover of a gun battle in which Hytner is killed. Bourne then steals a motorcycle from the back of a truck to follow the Hummer, which he thinks Cevik is still trying to escape in. Once the Hummer is stopped up the street, CIA officers surround the car, waiting for the prisoners to step out. Bourne then realizes the car is rigged to explode. He grabs Soraya and they make their way to safety just before detonation.

Later, Jakob and Lev Silver (Fadi and Muta ibn Aziz in disguise) arrive at the Hotel Constitution, located on the northeast corner of 20th and F Streets. They have a hotel worker named Omar bring them some champagne; the room service was merely a ruse to kill the innocent man and use his likeness to disguise Fadi in an elaborate diversion to easily get Fadi out of the country. Fadi kills Omar, uses makeup and props to disguise his own face with Omar's features, sprays the room with Carbon Disulfide and sets fire to the suite. The room burns, and turns Omar's body into unrecognizable ash as Fadi slips away.

Bourne boards a plane intent on finding Fadi. While on board he looks at some of the pictures that Deron has given him on Fadi. Bourne ends up going from London to Addis Ababa; Ababa to Djibouti. In Djibouti, he takes a CIA helicopter to Ras Dejen to look for Fadi and check the area. He finds a body suspiciously drained of all its natural fluids; he suspects radiation is the key. While there, in the wreck of Skorpion One, Bourne sees a boy, Alem. Alem leads him into town and to his father. After being chased by terrorists, he goes and sees the victims of Skorpion One inside a church. There the pilot, Jaime Cowell, tells him that Fadi was torturing Lindros.

Meanwhile, Martin Lindros is being tortured by Fadi and his men, and they are all on the move. They relocate Martin to places that are safe for Fadi and his people; and sufficiently away from Bourne. In this case they move him to a Dujja hiding place in a cave. When Bourne arrives in Ras Dejen, he is able to rescue Lindros (actually Karim al-Jamil) and brings him back to the CIA, where Karim sends him to Munich to meet with Yevgeny Feyodovich, a man that does business with Dujja. Karim gets word from his source that Bourne will be landing tomorrow, and gives orders for him to be executed.

Upon arriving and starting what he believes to be his mission, Bourne discovers Edor Vladovich Lemontov (a fictitious drug lord that Bourne was to meet with) is not a real person, and ends up in a chase with the terrorists. The chase culminates with Bourne ending up on a beach face to face with Fadi. Fadi says "I've waited a long time for this moment," referring to the time that Bourne killed his sister (which we later learn is untrue). Fadi and Bourne fight, with Fadi stabbing Bourne with a knife. During the struggle, a dog attacks Fadi and bites him in the face, knocking him off his guard. The dog (a boxer named Oleksandr) is with Soraya and she is there in Odessa to help Bourne, unaware that she was sent by the impostor Lindros to be killed as well.

Bourne and Soraya escape and end up in Istanbul, Turkey, where they find a tracking device planted on him. This happened the day that they took Hiram Cevik out of his prison cage. Bourne figures out that the prisoner was actually Fadi in disguise. They also discover the truth behind a lot of the other deceptions being played out, including the fact that Soraya's friend, Anne Held was Karim (The Fake Lindros)'s Mistress, and the true mole in the CIA. They find out that Veintrop was hired by Fadi to do the surgery. They find out that Sunderland's office wasn't even open on Tuesday. Bourne sends Soraya back to the CIA to find the mole inside. Bourne goes to Nesim Hatun's house to ask him about some things. There he starts following Fadi's messenger back to Büyükada, where he poses as the pilot of Muta's airplane. They end up crashing, and Bourne finds out that he didn't actually kill Fadi's sister Sarah; Muta and his brother Abbud did because she was having a secret love affair, a mortal sin in Muslim tradition.

Bourne and his friend Feyd al-Sould, whose men kill Muta, find the underground opening to the Dujja facility in Miran Shah. Feyd al-Sould and his cadre go and blow up the water pipes, flooding the underground facility. Bourne then finds Lindros, being held hostage by Fadi, and kills both Abbud and Fadi. Fadi however, had managed to shoot a bullet through Lindros' jaw and eye socket, giving the injured CIA deputy director very little time to live. Katya Veintrop, Costin's wife, is also killed. Costin then deactivates the detonator bomb. Jason makes his way back to the CIA to kill Karim al-Jamil.

Meanwhile, Soraya and Tyrone, a friend of Bourne, are on the run from supremacists and terrorists. They end up finding the Old Man being embalmed in a mortuary, as they set out for the CIA headquarters. They get shot at by terrorists in the Old Man's limousine, thinking that they can get into the headquarters by showing them the DCI's face, redone by another one of Fadi's men, which they'll blow up with C-4. Soraya manages to cause the limo to crash and explode within feet of headquarters.

Bourne kills Karim al-Jamil at the IVT facility by using the same trademark as his nemesis Carlos the Jackal, a bullet to the throat. He then realizes that there is a second timer on the bomb. However, after thinking about it he realizes that the second timer was put in there by Veintrop, who, to get back at Fadi and Karim's men for hurting and torturing his wife, didn't connect it to the bomb. He then joins Martin's widow, Moira, in spreading his ashes.

== Reception ==
Kirkus Reviews critiqued the author for his choice to continue throwing Bourne into these types of situations when and pointed out that "[i]t becomes hard to believe that Bourne, a man known for his “animal instincts honed on stone and steel,” could make as many life-threatening blunders as he makes here." The magazine also continue by anticipating that fans might "think twice" before reading more of the series.

Publishers Weekly compared the author to the creator of the series, Robert Ludlum, stating that "Lustbader is less successful than Ludlum in dramatizing Bourne's inner torment—a feature that distinguished the character from many similar thriller heroes."
