= The Bourne Deception =

2009 novel by Eric Van Lustbader

- The Bourne Deception first edition cover
- Author: Robert Ludlum (series creator); Eric Van Lustbader
- Language: English
- Series: Jason Bourne
- Genre: Spy, thriller
- Publisher: Grand Central Publishing
- Publication date: June 9, 2009
- Publication place: United States
- Media type: Print (hardback)
- Pages: 432 pp (first edition)
- ISBN: 978-0-446-53982-1
- Preceded by: The Bourne Sanction
- Followed by: The Bourne Objective

The Bourne Deception is a novel by Eric Van Lustbader, the seventh in the Jason Bourne series created by Robert Ludlum. It was released on June 9, 2009. It is Lustbader's fourth Bourne novel, following The Bourne Sanction, which was published in 2008.

== Plot ==
The Bourne Deception picks up where The Bourne Sanction left off. Jason Bourne's nemesis, Arkadin, is still hot on his trail and the two continue their struggle, reversing roles of hunter and hunted.

When Bourne is ambushed and badly wounded in Bali, he fakes his death and goes into hiding. Only his close friends, Moira Trevor and Freddie Willard, are aware that he is alive. In safety, he takes on a new identity, and begins a mission to find out who tried to assassinate him. Jason begins to question who he really is, how much of him is tied up in the Bourne identity, and what he would become if that was suddenly taken away from him.

Shortly after, an American passenger airliner is shot down over Egypt by an Iranian missile. This is where a global conspiracy is revealed. Bud Halliday is at the helm of manipulations by the NSA, assisted by a wet-work outfit known as Black River. DCI Veronica Hart was an ex-employee of Black River like Moira Trevor, and is at loggerheads with the intentions of Bud Halliday.

Moira Trevor has started her own company which is a direct competitor of Black River. A global investigative team, led by Soraya Moore, is assembled to get at the truth of the situation before it can escalate into an international scandal. The conspiracy is discovered by one of Moira's employees and he is subsequently killed, with Moira being left in grave danger.

The trail to his assassin leads Bourne to Seville. On the way there, he meets Tracy Atherton, who tells him that she is going to Seville to buy the 14th Black Painting. In Seville, Bourne is attacked in a bullfighting arena by a killer named The Torturer.

Later on, search for the man who shot him intersects with the search for the people that brought down the airliner, leading Bourne into one of the most deadly and challenging situations he has ever encountered. With the threat of a new world war brewing, Bourne finds himself in a race against time to uncover the truth and find the person behind his assault, all the while stalked by his unknown nemesis.

== Publication history ==
- 2009, US, Grand Central Publishing ISBN 978-0-446-53982-1, Pub date June 9, 2009, Hardback.
- 2009, UK, Orion Publishing Group ISBN 978-1-4091-0161-1, Pub date June 11, 2009, Hardback.
