= The Bourne Dominion =

2011 novel by Eric Van Lustbader

- The Bourne Dominion American hardback edition
- Author: Robert Ludlum (series creator); Eric Van Lustbader
- Language: English
- Series: Jason Bourne
- Genre: Spy, thriller
- Publisher: Grand Central Publishing (US)
- Publication date: July 19, 2011
- Publication place: United States
- Media type: Print (hardback)
- Pages: 432 Pages pp (First edition)
- ISBN: 0-446-56444-3
- Preceded by: The Bourne Objective
- Followed by: The Bourne Imperative

The Bourne Dominion is the ninth novel in the Bourne series and sixth by Eric Van Lustbader. The book was released on June 19, 2011, as a sequel to The Bourne Objective.

== Plot summary ==
Jason Bourne is searching for an elusive cadre of terrorists planning to destroy America's most strategic natural resources-and needs the help of his longtime friend, General Boris Karpov. Karpov, the newly appointed head of Russia's most feared spy agency, FSB-2, is one of the most determined, honorable, and justice-hungry men that Bourne knows. But Karpov has made a deal with the devil. In order to remain the head of FSB-2, he must hunt down and kill Bourne. Now, these two trusted friends are on a deadly collision course. From the Colombian highlands to Munich, Cadiz, and Damascus, the clock is counting down to a disaster that will cripple America's economic and military future. Only Bourne and Karpov have a chance to avert the catastrophe-but if they destroy each other first, that chance will be gone forever.

== Reception ==
Scott Wilson of The Fringe Magazine stated that, "Van Lustbader has done a brilliant job in taking the character and series further from Ludlum’s creation. The transition from The Bourne Ultimatum to The Bourne Legacy was seamless with little noticeable difference in the style of the two authors."

Stephanie Grimes of Deseret News commented, "Viewed as a Lustbader book, and not a continuation of the character Ludlum created, The Bourne Dominion is a captivating, action-packed novel that will leave readers hungry for the next installment."

Publishers Weekly praised the author for his skillful ability to maneuver the characters without losing track of the plot.

== See also ==
Audio book review.
