= Eric Van Lustbader =

American novelist (born 1946)

- Born: December 24, 1946 (age 79); Greenwich Village, New York City, U.S.
- Education: Columbia University
- Occupation: Novelist
- Writing career
- Genres: Thriller, fantasy
- Notable works: The Sunset Warrior Cycle (1977–1997); The Ninja (1980); The new Jason Bourne novels

Eric Van Lustbader (born December 24, 1946) is an American author of thriller and fantasy novels. He has published as Eric Lustbader, Eric V. Lustbader, and Eric Van Lustbader.

He is a graduate of New York's Stuyvesant High School and Columbia College, with a degree in sociology, and he has a second-level Reiki degree. He is married to Victoria Lustbader (née Schochet), who is also an author, as well as an editor.

== Biography ==
Lustbader was born and raised in Greenwich Village, where he developed interests in art and writing. He lived downstairs from actress Lauren Bacall, and built orange-crate racers in Washington Square Park with actors Keith and David Carradine. He is a graduate of Columbia College, with a degree in sociology.

Before turning to writing full-time, he was employed by the New York City public school system, where he holds licenses in both elementary and early childhood education, and in the music business, where he worked for Elektra Records and CBS Records. Writing for Cashbox magazine, he also covered such acts as Elton John, Santana, Roxy Music, the Jimi Hendrix Experience, David Bowie, and The Who. Lustbader became friends with Elton John and his lyricist, Bernie Taupin, as the first American journalist to predict John would be a huge star, in his column in Cashbox. He went out on tour with John, including the dates at the Fillmore East, Carnegie Hall, and Madison Square Garden in November 1974 when John Lennon guest starred on the third night of the four nights. Several years later, while working for Dick James Music, he wrote and field produced a segment on John for John Chancellor's NBC Nightly News, the first such segment on an entertainer.

== Bibliography ==
=== The Pearl Saga ===
1. The Ring of Five Dragons (2001)
2. The Veil of a Thousand Tears (2002)
3. The Cage of Nine Banestones (2004) (US title: Mistress of the Pearl)

=== The Testament Novels ===
1. The Testament (2006)
2. The Fallen (2017)
3. Four Dominions (2018)
4. The Sum of All Shadows (2019)

=== The Sunset Warrior Cycle ===
1. The Sunset Warrior (1977)
2. Shallows of Night (1978)
3. Dai-San (1978)
4. Beneath an Opal Moon (1980)
5. Dragons on the Sea of Night (1997)

=== The China Maroc Series ===
1. Jian (1986)
2. Shan (1988)

=== The Nicholas Linnear/Ninja Cycle ===
1. The Ninja (1980)
2. The Miko (1984)
3. White Ninja (1990)
4. The Kaisho (1993)
5. Floating City (1994)
6. Second Skin (1995)
7. "The Death and Life of Nicholas Linnear" (2014) e-book short story
8. "The Oligarch's Daughter" (2016) e-book short story

=== The Jack McClure / Alli Carson Series ===
1. First Daughter (2008)
2. Last Snow (2010)
3. Blood Trust (2011)
4. Father Night (2012)
5. Beloved Enemy (2013)

=== The Evan Ryder Series ===
1. The Nemesis Manifesto (2020)
2. The Kobalt Dossier (2021)
3. Omega Rules (2022)
4. The Quantum Solution (2023)
5. White Wolf (2025)

=== Continuation of The Bourne Series of Robert Ludlum ===
With permission from the estate of Robert Ludlum, Lustbader continued writing Jason Bourne novels from where Ludlum left off in The Bourne Ultimatum until 2018, when he left the series.

1. The Bourne Legacy (2004)
2. The Bourne Betrayal (2007)
3. The Bourne Sanction (2008)
4. The Bourne Deception (2009)
5. The Bourne Objective (2010)
6. The Bourne Dominion (2011)
7. The Bourne Imperative (2012)
8. The Bourne Retribution (2013)
9. The Bourne Ascendancy (2014)
10. The Bourne Enigma (2016)
11. The Bourne Initiative (2017)

=== Others ===
- Sirens (1981)
- Black Heart (1983)
- Zero (1987)
- French Kiss (1989)
- Angel Eyes (1991)
- Black Blade (1993)
- Batman: The Last Angel (1994); DC Comics graphic novel
- Dark Homecoming (1997)
- Pale Saint (1999)
- Art Kills (2002)
- Any Minute Now (2016)

=== Anthologies containing stories by Eric Van Lustbader ===
- David Copperfield's Beyond Imagination (1982)
- Peter S Beagle's Immortal Unicorn (1984)
- Raymond Chandler's Philip Marlowe: A Centennial Celebration (1988)
- David Copperfield's Tales of the Impossible (1995)
- Excalibur (1995)
- Murder by Revenge (1996)
- Vampires (1997)
- 999 (1999)
- Thriller (2006)
- Women of the Night (2007)
- A gallery of horror (short story collection). "In darkness, angels. (1983).

=== Short stories ===
- "In Darkness, Angels" (1983)
- "The Devil on Myrtle Ave" (1995)
- "Lassorio" (1995)
- "The Singing Tree" (1995)
- "16 Mins." (1996)
- "An Exaltation of Termagants" (1999)
