= The Bourne Retribution =

2013 novel by Eric Van Lustbader

- Author: Robert Ludlum (series creator); Eric Van Lustbader
- Language: English
- Series: Jason Bourne
- Genre: Spy, thriller
- Publisher: Grand Central Publishing (US)
- Publication date: December 3, 2013
- Publication place: United States
- Media type: Print (hardback)
- Pages: 432 Pages pp (first edition)
- ISBN: 1455550957
- Preceded by: The Bourne Imperative
- Followed by: The Bourne Ascendancy

The Bourne Retribution is the eleventh novel in the Bourne series and eighth by Eric Van Lustbader. The book was released on December 3, 2013, as a sequel to The Bourne Imperative. It was followed up with The Bourne Ascendancy.

== Plot summary ==
Bourne's friend Eli Yadin, head of Mossad, learns that Ouyang Jidan, a senior member of China's Politburo, and a major Mexican drug lord may have been trafficking in more than drugs. Yadin needs Bourne to investigate. Bourne agrees, but only because he has a personal agenda: Ouyang Jidan is the man who ordered Rebeka—one of the only people Bourne has ever truly cared about—murdered. Bourne is determined to avenge her death, but in the process he becomes enmeshed in a monstrous worldwide scheme involving the Chinese, Mexicans, and Russians. Bourne's desperate search for Ouyang takes him from Tel Aviv to Shanghai, Mexico City, and, ultimately, a village on China's coast where a clever trap has been laid for him. Bourne finds himself pursued on all sides and unsure whom he can trust.

Jason's adventure begins when Eden Mazar, an Israeli Mossad agent, is murdered by members of a Mexican drug cartel named Los Zetas. Following this, he is approached by Mossad director Eli Yadin, who invites Bourne to embark on a mission to find a connection between Eden Mazar's murder and the death of Rebeka, Bourne's love interest. Bourne goes to Shanghai, under an alias, but he later disposes of his disguise and pursues Ouyang's right-hand man, Colonel Sun. After finding out about this, Amir Ophir, another Israeli Mossad member, sends an assassin named Retzach to kill Bourne, but Bourne kills Retzach instead. Following this, Bourne goes on a wild goose chase for Ouyang, which comes to a head in Mexico City, where he encounters Maricruz, wife of Ouyang Jidan, who has been injured in an attack by a rival cartel in Mexico and is currently caring for a girl named Angel. Later, Colonel Sun appears at the hospital and, upon seeing Maricruz with Angel, begins verbally abusing and later threatening Angel. Bourne, disguised as a doctor, intervenes and fights Sun, who is ultimately killed by Angel.

Following this, Bourne escapes with Maricruz and Angel, and later drops them off at the house of Anunciata, a friend of Bourne whom he rescued in the previous novel. Bourne is later framed for bombing the SUV of a cartel leader named Carlos Danda Carlos, and eventually falls victim to an attempted murder by Ophir, whom Bourne eliminates. Later, he buys a flamethrower from an arms dealer named J.J. Hale, which he later uses to kill Carlos Danda Carlos. Following this, Bourne leaves Mexico and goes to China, where he teams up with a Russian FSB agent named Leonid. Disguised as a member of Ouyang's staff, Bourne infiltrates Ouyang's estate, but his cover is blown and he is eventually captured.

After a tense interrogation session, Bourne breaks free, then engages in a fight against Ouyang, who attacks Bourne with a sword. Bourne ultimately kills Ouyang, fulfilling his vengeance against the Chinese Politburo member.

Later, Bourne returns to Israel, where he is surprised to see Rebeka (her real name is revealed to be Sara Yadin) alive and well, later learning that Eli Yadin had a plan involving Rebeka faking her death following her grievous injury inflicted upon her in the previous novel, and later using Bourne to wreak his retribution against Ouyang on Yadin's behalf. The novel ends with Bourne kissing Sara\Rebeka in the hospital.

== Reception ==
Publishers Weekly commented, "Whatever was original in Ludlum's initial conception of an amnesiac superagent in his trilogy has long been lost in a welter of clichés, with the worst saved for last."

Joel Wijesuria of The Star Online commented, "Bringing the same action vibe as his previous books in the series, Lustbader manages again to capture the essence of the master spy, faithfully carrying on the legacy entrusted to him by the Ludlum estate. Lustbader’s Bourne is every bit the consummate spy, straddling the grey area between professionalism and passion."
