= The Bourne Imperative =

2012 novel by Eric Van Lustbader

- The Bourne Imperative American hardback edition
- Author: Robert Ludlum (series creator); Eric Van Lustbader
- Language: English
- Series: Jason Bourne
- Genre: Spy, thriller
- Publisher: Grand Central Publishing (US)
- Publication date: June 5, 2012
- Publication place: United States
- Media type: Print (hardback)
- Pages: 448 Pages pp (first edition)
- ISBN: 0446564478
- Preceded by: The Bourne Dominion
- Followed by: The Bourne Retribution

The Bourne Imperative is the tenth novel in the Bourne series and seventh by Eric Van Lustbader. The book was released on June 5, 2012, as a sequel to The Bourne Dominion.

== Plot summary ==
The man Jason Bourne fished out of the freezing sea is near death, half-drowned and bleeding profusely from a gunshot wound. He awakens with no memory of who he is or why he was shot-and Bourne is reminded of his own amnesia. Then Bourne discovers that the Mossad agent named Rebeka is so determined to find this injured man that she has gone off the grid, cut her ties to her agency, and is now being stalked by Mossad's most feared killer. Do the answers to these mysteries lie back in southeast Lebanon, in a secret encampment to which Bourne and Rebeka escaped following a firefight weeks ago? The complex trail links to the mission given to Treadstone directors Peter Marks and Soraya Moore: find the terrorist assassin known as Nicodemo. In the course of Bourne's search for a secret that will alter the future of the entire world, he will experience both triumph and loss, and his life will never be the same. Now everything turns on the amnesiac. Bourne must learn his identity and purpose before both he and Rebeka are killed. From Stockholm to Washington, D.C., from Mexico City to Beijing, the web of lies and betrayals extends into a worldwide conspiracy of monumental proportions.

== Reception ==
David Pitt of Booklist commented, "Unlike Ludlum, whose prose frequently tended toward the stodgy, Van Lustbader pulls readers through the story with gusto, as Bourne confronts a man in a situation very much like his own, and Treadstone agents Marks and Moore try to determine whether they can trust a new man on the team. For series fans, a solid continuation of Bourne's story."

Henry Morrison, of the Henry Morrison Agency, wrote for Publishers Weekly stating that "[e]stablished fans will find all the usual cliffhangers, hairbreadth escapes, and multiple betrayals they expect from this series."

On the other hand Kirkus disagreed with other reviewers referring to the book as "tedious" and "devoid of suspense."

== See also ==
Audio book review.
