= The Bourne Enigma =

2016 novel by Eric Van Lustbader

- Author: Robert Ludlum (series creator); Eric Van Lustbader
- Language: English
- Series: Jason Bourne
- Genre: Spy, thriller
- Publisher: Grand Central Publishing (US)
- Publication date: June 21, 2016
- Publication place: United States
- Media type: Print (hardback)
- Pages: 432 Pages pp (first edition)
- ISBN: 1455550957
- Preceded by: The Bourne Ascendancy
- Followed by: The Bourne Initiative

The Bourne Enigma is the thirteenth novel in the Bourne series and tenth by Eric Van Lustbader. The book was released on June 21, 2016, as a sequel to The Bourne Ascendancy.

== Plot summary ==
On the eve of Russian general Boris Karpov's wedding, Jason Bourne receives an enigmatic message from his old friend and fellow spymaster. In Moscow, what should be a joyous occasion turns bloody and lethal. Now Bourne is the only one who can decipher Karpov's cryptogram. He discovers that Karpov has betrayed his sovereign to warn Bourne of a crippling disaster about to be visited on the world. Bourne has only four days to discover the nature of the disaster and stop it.

The trail Karpov has been following leads Bourne to Cairo and the doorstep of Ivan Borz, the international arms dealer infamous for hiding behind a never-ending series of false identities, a man Bourne has been hunting ever since he abducted former Treadstone director Soraya Moore and her two-year-old daughter and brutally murdered Soraya's husband.

Bourne must travel to war-torn Syria and then Cyprus. He has less than four days to accomplish the tasks to prevent a cataclysmic international war.

== Reception ==
The Real Book Spy commented, "Van Lustbader knows just how to keep fans on the edges of their seats as he lays out the story’s plot, sucking them in and setting up for a climactic ending that doesn’t disappoint."

Ray Palen of The Book Reporter stated that, "The Bourne Enigma is a rollicking roller coaster ride of spy games and colorful characters set against the expected multiple international locales...This is an enjoyable and fast-paced read that faithfully continues the enigma that is Jason Bourne."
