= Moby discography =

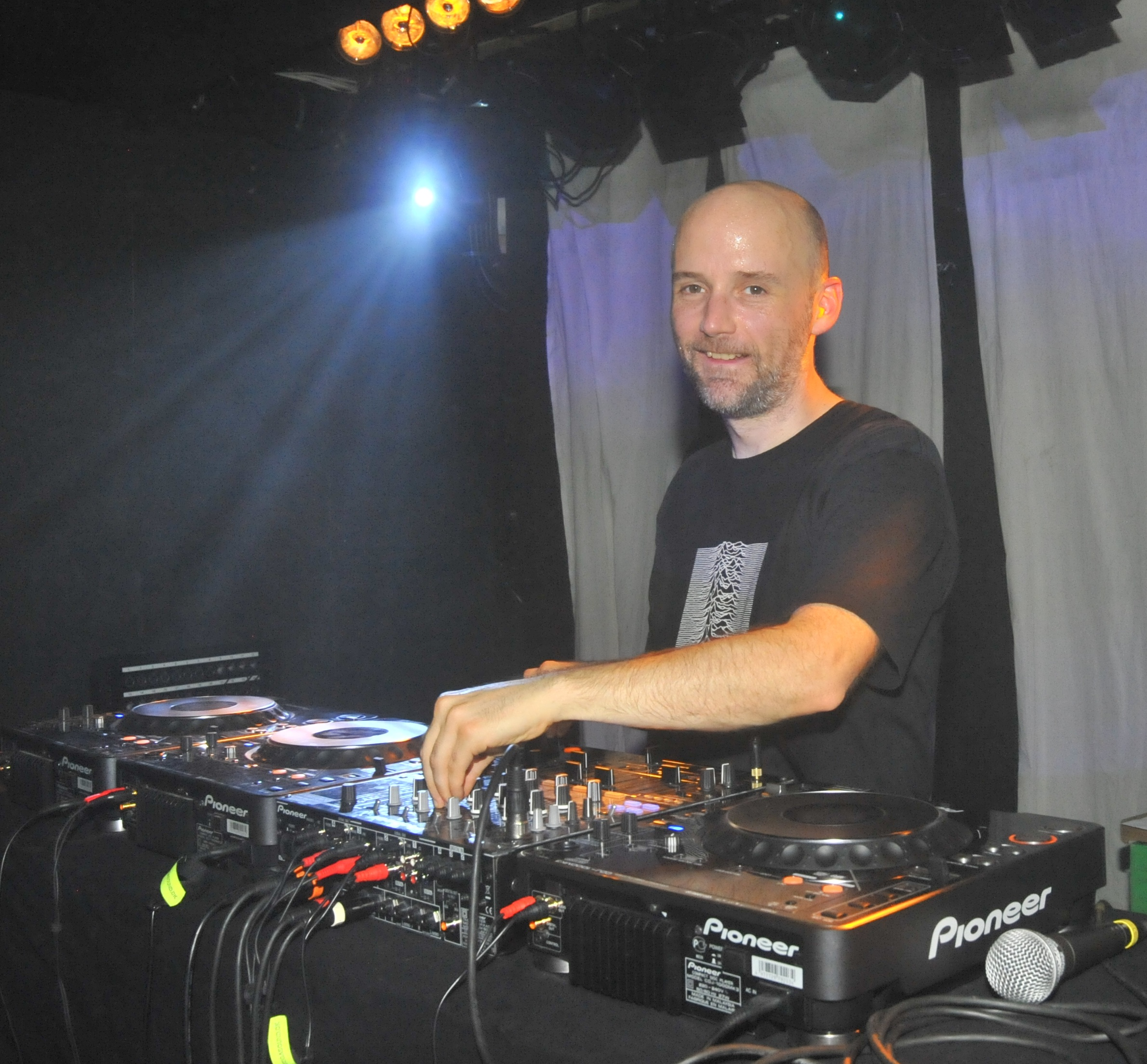
- Moby performing in Copenhagen, Denmark in 2009
- Studio albums: 23
- Extended plays: 4
- Live albums: 1
- Compilation albums: 11
- Singles: 89
- Video albums: 3
- Music videos: 154
- Promotional singles: 14
- Remixes: 44
- Remix albums: 12

The discography of American musician Moby consists of twenty-three studio albums, one live album, eleven compilation albums, twelve remix albums, three video albums, four extended plays, eighty-nine singles, fourteen promotional singles, a hundred and fifty-four music videos, and forty-four remixes.

== Albums ==
=== Studio albums ===
List of studio albums, with selected chart positions and sales figures
Title	Album details	Peak chart positions										Sales	Certifications
Title	Album details	US	AUS	AUT	BEL	FRA	GER	NLD	NZ	SWI	UK	Sales	Certifications
Moby	Released: July 27, 1992; Label: Instinct; Formats: CD, cassette, LP	—	—	—	—	—	—	—	—	—	—		
Ambient	Released: August 17, 1993; Label: Instinct; Formats: CD, cassette, LP	—	—	—	—	—	—	—	—	—	—		
Everything Is Wrong	Released: March 14, 1995; Label: Mute, Elektra; Formats: CD, cassette, LP	—	—	—	—	—	69	43	—	—	21	US: 180,000; WW: 250,000	BPI: Gold
Animal Rights	Released: September 23, 1996; Label: Mute, Elektra; Formats: CD, cassette, LP	—	—	—	41	—	—	—	—	—	38		
Play	Released: May 17, 1999; Label: Mute, V2; Formats: CD, cassette, LP	38	1	7	3	1	21	5	1	12	1	US: 2,700,000; UK: 1,850,388; WW: 12,000,000	RIAA: 2× Platinum; ARIA: 4× Platinum; BPI: 6× Platinum; BRMA: 2× Platinum; BVMI: Gold; IFPI AUT: Gold; IFPI SWI: 3× Gold; NVPI: 2× Platinum; RMNZ: 7× Platinum; SNEP: Diamond
18	Released: May 14, 2002; Label: Mute, V2; Formats: CD, cassette, LP	4	1	1	1	1	1	2	1	1	1	US: 513,000; UK: 518,828; WW: 4,000,000	RIAA: Gold; ARIA: Platinum; BPI: Platinum; BRMA: Platinum; BVMI: Gold; IFPI SWI: Platinum; NVPI: Gold; RMNZ: Platinum; SNEP: Platinum
Hotel	Released: March 14, 2005; Label: Mute; Formats: CD, LP, digital download	28	10	2	1	2	3	2	10	1	8	UK: 100,411; WW: 2,000,000	BPI: Gold; BRMA: Gold; BVMI: Gold; IFPI AUT: Gold; IFPI SWI: Gold; SNEP: Platinum
Last Night	Released: March 29, 2008; Label: Mute; Formats: CD, LP, digital download	27	20	4	2	12	10	22	30	6	28	UK: 21,013	BRMA: Gold; IFPI SWI: Gold; SNEP: Gold
Wait for Me	Released: June 30, 2009; Label: Mute, Little Idiot; Formats: CD, LP, digital download	22	50	15	2	5	18	16	40	4	44		BRMA: Gold
Destroyed	Released: May 13, 2011; Label: Mute, Little Idiot; Formats: CD, LP, digital download	69	—	27	6	19	10	14	—	7	35	FRA: 15,000	
Innocents	Released: October 1, 2013; Label: Mute, Little Idiot; Formats: CD, LP, digital download	66	35	16	5	18	22	25	39	11	35	FRA: 13,000	
Long Ambients 1: Calm. Sleep.	Released: February 25, 2016; Label: Independent; Formats: Digital download, streaming	—	—	—	198	—	—	—	—	—	—		
These Systems Are Failing (with the Void Pacific Choir)	Released: October 14, 2016; Label: Mute, Little Idiot; Formats: CD, LP, digital download	—	—	—	39	63	—	—	—	75	—		
More Fast Songs About the Apocalypse (with the Void Pacific Choir)	Released: June 12, 2017; Label: Mute, Little Idiot; Formats: CD, LP, digital download	—	—	—	—	—	—	—	—	—	—		
Everything Was Beautiful, and Nothing Hurt	Released: March 2, 2018; Label: Mute, Little Idiot; Formats: CD, LP, digital download	—	—	36	8	82	38	90	—	23	30		
Long Ambients 2	Released: March 15, 2019; Label: Independent; Formats: Digital download, streaming	—	—	—	—	—	—	—	—	—	—		
All Visible Objects	Released: May 15, 2020; Label: Mute, Little Idiot; Formats: CD, LP, digital download	—	—	59	25	160	28	—	—	14	—		
Live Ambients – Improvised Recordings Vol. 1	Released: December 24, 2020; Label: Independent; Formats: Digital download, streaming	—	—	—	—	—	—	—	—	—	—		
Reprise	Released: May 28, 2021; Label: Deutsche Grammophon; Formats: CD, LP, CS, DD	—	32	3	5	30	4	8	40	1	21		
Ambient 23	Released: January 1, 2023; Label: Independent; Formats: DD	—	—	—	—	—	—	—	—	—	—		
Resound NYC	Released: May 12, 2023; Label: Deutsche Grammophon; Formats: CD, LP, CS, DD	—	—	17	39	53	11	—	—	8	—		
Always Centered at Night	Released: June 14, 2024; Label: Mute; Formats: CD, LP, digital download	—	—	29	35	—	18	—	—	25	—		
Future Quiet	Released: February 20, 2026; Label: BMG; Formats: CD, LP, digital download	—	—	—	98	—	63	—	—	33	—		
"—" denotes a recording that did not chart or was not released in that territory.

=== Live albums ===
List of live albums, with selected chart positions
Title	Album details
iTunes Festival London 2011	Released: August 4, 2011; Label: Little Idiot, Because; Formats: Digital download

=== Compilation albums ===
List of compilation albums, with selected chart positions and certifications
Title	Album details	Peak chart positions										Certifications
Title	Album details	US	US Dance	AUT	BEL	FRA	GER	NLD	NZ	SWI	UK	Certifications
Instinct Dance	Released: November 30, 1991; Label: Instinct; Formats: CD, LP	—	—	—	—	—	—	—	—	—	—	
Early Underground	Released: March 10, 1993; Label: Instinct; Formats: CD	—	—	—	—	—	—	—	—	—	—	
Rare: The Collected B-Sides 1989–1993	Released: August 6, 1996; Label: Instinct; Formats: CD	—	—	—	—	—	—	—	—	—	—	
I Like to Score	Released: 21 October 1997; Label: Mute, Elektra; Formats: CD, LP, CS	—	—	—	—	83	—	—	—	—	54	BPI: Silver
MobySongs 1993–1998	Released: July 18, 2000; Label: Elektra; Formats: CD	137	—	—	—	—	—	—	—	—	—	
Play: The B Sides	Released: October 24, 2000; Label: V2; Formats: CD, cassette	165	14	—	—	—	—	—	—	—	24	
18 B Sides + DVD	Released: November 18, 2003; Label: Mute, V2; Formats: CD/DVD	—	4	—	—	—	—	—	—	—	—	
iTunes Originals – Moby	Released: July 26, 2005; Label: V2; Formats: Digital download	—	—	—	—	—	—	—	—	—	—	
Go – The Very Best of Moby	Released: October 24, 2006; Label: Mute, V2; Formats: CD, digital download	153	3	20	1	—	31	25	14	4	23	BPI: Gold; BRMA: Gold; IFPI SWI: Gold; RMNZ: Gold; SNEP: Gold
A Night in NYC	Released: May 4, 2008; Label: UpFront; Formats: CD	—	—	—	—	—	—	—	—	—	—	
Music from Porcelain	Released: May 27, 2016; Label: Little Idiot; Formats: CD, digital download	—	—	—	—	122	—	—	—	—	—	
"—" denotes a recording that did not chart or was not released in that territory.

=== Remix albums ===
List of remix albums, with selected chart positions
Title	Album details	Peak chart positions				Certifications
Title	Album details	US Dance	BEL (FL)	GRC	UK	Certifications
Everything Is Wrong: Non-Stop DJ Mix by Evil Ninja Moby	Released: January 16, 1996; Label: Mute; Formats: CD, cassette	—	—	—	25	BPI: Gold
Go – The Very Best of Moby: Remixed	Released: March 1, 2007; Label: Mute; Formats: CD	—	33	—	—	
Last Night Remixed	Released: November 3, 2008; Label: Mute; Formats: CD, digital download	17	—	—	—	
Wait for Me: Ambient	Released: November 2, 2009; Label: Little Idiot; Formats: CD, digital download	15	—	—	—	
Wait for Me. Remixes!	Released: May 18, 2010; Label: Mute; Formats: CD, digital download	23	—	5	—	
Destroyed Remixed	Released: May 1, 2012; Label: Mute, Little Idiot; Formats: CD, digital download	—	—	—	—	
The Remixes (Go, Porcelain, Natural Blues)	Released: July 25, 2016; Label: Revealed, Cloud 9; Formats: digital download	—	—	—	—	
The Remixes	Released: November 14, 2016; Label: Drumcode; Formats: digital download	—	—	—	—	
Moby Remixes	Released: December 14, 2016; Label: 2Diy4, Diynamic; Formats: 12", digital download	—	—	—	—	
Black Lacquer	Released: February 10, 2017; Label: Fool's Gold; Formats: digital download	—	—	—	—	
Suara Remixes	Released: March 6, 2017; Label: Suara; Formats: 12", digital download	—	—	—	—	
Reprise – Remixes	Released: May 20, 2022; Label: Deutsche Grammophon; Formats:	—	193	—	—	
"—" denotes a recording that did not chart or was not released in that territory.

=== Video releases ===
List of DVDs, with selected chart positions and certifications
Title	Album details	Peak chart positions	Certifications
Title	Album details	US Video	Certifications
Play: The DVD	Released: July 10, 2001; Label: Mute, V2; Formats: DVD	1	RIAA: Gold; ARIA: Gold
Live: Hotel Tour	Released: March 31, 2006; Label: Mute; Formats: DVD	—	
Almost Home: Live at the Fonda Theatre, LA	Released: March 3, 2014; Label: Mute, Little Idiot; Formats: CD/DVD	—	
"—" denotes a recording that did not chart or was not released in that territory.

== Extended plays ==
List of extended plays
Title	EP details
Move – The E.P.	Released: August 31, 1993; Label: Mute, Elektra; Formats: CD, CS, 12"
Disk	Released: July 1, 1995; Label: Elektra; Formats: CD
The BioShock EP (with Oscar the Punk)	Released: December 4, 2007; Label: Rapture; Formats: CD
Be the One	Released: February 15, 2011; Label: Little Idiot, Mute; Formats: CD, digital download

== Singles ==
List of singles, with selected chart positions and certifications, showing year released and album name
Title	Year	Peak chart positions										Certifications	Album
Title	Year	US	US Dance	AUS	AUT	BEL	FRA	GER	NLD	SWI	UK	Certifications	Album
"Mobility"	1990	—	—	—	—	—	—	—	—	—	—		Instinct Dance
"Go"	1991	—	18	—	—	20	—	—	9	—	10	BPI: Silver	Moby
"Drop a Beat"	1992	—	6	—	—	—	—	—	—	—	—		Moby
"Next Is the E"	1992	—	8	—	—	—	—	—	—	—	—		Moby
"I Feel It" / "Thousand"	1993	—	—	—	—	—	—	—	—	—	38		Moby
"Move (You Make Me Feel So Good)"	1993	—	1	—	—	—	—	—	23	—	21		Move – The E.P.
"All That I Need Is to Be Loved"	1993	—	—	—	—	—	—	—	—	—	—		Move – The E.P.
"Hymn"	1994	—	10	—	—	—	—	—	—	46	31		Everything Is Wrong
"Feeling So Real"	1994	—	9	—	21	—	—	14	12	9	30		Everything Is Wrong
"Everytime You Touch Me"	1995	—	17	—	—	46	—	—	25	—	28		Everything Is Wrong
"Into the Blue"	1995	—	—	—	—	—	—	—	—	—	34		Everything Is Wrong
"Bring Back My Happiness"	1996	—	10	—	—	—	—	—	—	—	—		Everything Is Wrong
"That's When I Reach for My Revolver"	1996	—	—	—	—	64	—	—	—	—	50		Animal Rights
"Come on Baby"	1996	—	—	—	—	—	—	—	—	—	—		Animal Rights
"James Bond Theme (Moby's Re-Version)"	1997	—	1	65	—	44	41	48	37	17	8		I Like to Score
"Honey"	1998	—	— (Note: "Honey" and "Run On" did not enter the Hot Dance Club Songs chart, but peaked at number 49 on the Hot Dance Music/Maxi-Singles Sales chart as a double A-side single.)	95	30	—	—	77	94	—	33		Play
"Run On"	1999	—	—	—	93	—	—	—	—	—	33		Play
"Bodyrock"	1999	—	6	—	—	—	—	—	—	—	38		Play
"Why Does My Heart Feel So Bad?"	1999	—	—	33	4	61	—	3	61	4	16	BPI: Gold; BVMI: Platinum; IFPI AUT: Gold	Play
"Natural Blues"	2000	—	11	—	—	28	9	46	66	28	11	BPI: Silver; SNEP: Gold	Play
"Porcelain"	2000	—	14	56	—	52	99	63	68	79	5	BPI: Platinum	Play
"Why Does My Heart Feel So Bad?" / "Honey" (Remix) (featuring Kelis)	2000	—	—	56	—	—	4	—	—	17	—		Play
"South Side" (featuring Gwen Stefani)	2000	14	16	—	—	—	—	—	—	—	—		Play
"Find My Baby"	2000	—	—	—	—	54	53	—	94	—	—		Play
"We Are All Made of Stars"	2002	—	19	23	50	52	40	60	54	17	11		18
"We Are All Made of Stars" (Remixes)	2002	—	13	—	—	—	—	—	—	—	—		18
"Extreme Ways"	2002	—	12	—	—	—	53	—	—	91	39		18
"In This World"	2002	—	18	88	—	16	22	78	47	66	35		18
"In My Heart"	2003	—	—	—	—	—	76	—	—	—	—		18
"Sunday (The Day Before My Birthday)"	2003	—	—	—	—	59	—	—	93	—	—		18
"Jam for the Ladies" (with Princess Superstar, featuring MC Lyte and Angie Stone)	2003	—	—	62	—	64	—	—	—	—	—		18
"Make Love Fuck War" (with Public Enemy)	2004	—	—	—	—	—	—	—	—	—	—		New Whirl Odor
"Lift Me Up"	2005	—	—	—	12	8	6	12	23	24	18	SNEP: Gold	Hotel
"Raining Again"	2005	—	—	52	—	54	—	82	—	96	—		Hotel
"Spiders"	2005	—	—	—	—	—	—	—	—	—	50		Hotel
"Dream About Me"	2005	—	—	—	—	—	—	—	—	—	—		Hotel
"Beautiful"	2005	—	—	—	—	66	63	90	—	—	—		Hotel
"Slipping Away"	2006	—	—	—	—	59	—	63	—	—	53		Hotel
"Slipping Away (Crier la vie)" (featuring Mylène Farmer)	2006	—	—	—	—	1	1	—	—	18	—	SNEP: Gold	Go – The Very Best of Moby
"Escapar (Slipping Away)" (featuring Amaral)	2006	—	—	—	—	—	—	—	—	—	—		Go – The Very Best of Moby
"New York, New York" (featuring Debbie Harry)	2006	—	—	—	47	38	—	69	64	80	43		Go – The Very Best of Moby
"Extreme Ways (Bourne's Ultimatum)"	2007	—	—	—	—	—	—	—	—	—	45	BPI: Silver	The Bourne Ultimatum soundtrack
"Alice"	2008	—	—	—	—	—	—	—	—	—	—		Last Night
"Disco Lies"	2008	—	1	—	21	4	—	8	67	10	140		Last Night
"I Love to Move in Here"	2008	—	1	—	—	47	—	—	—	—	—		Last Night
"Ooh Yeah"	2008	—	3	—	—	—	—	—	—	—	—		Last Night
"Shot in the Back of the Head"	2009	—	—	—	—	—	—	—	—	—	—		Wait for Me
"Pale Horses"	2009	—	— (Note: "Pale Horses" did not enter the Hot Dance Club Songs chart, but peaked at number 3 on the Hot Dance Singles Sales chart.)	—	—	20	—	—	—	—	—		Wait for Me
"Mistake"	2009	—	19	—	—	52	—	—	—	—	—		Wait for Me
"One Time We Lived"	2009	—	—	—	—	—	—	—	—	—	—		Wait for Me
"Wait for Me"	2010	—	— (Note: "Wait for Me" did not enter the Hot Dance Club Songs chart, but peaked at number 5 on the Hot Dance Singles Sales chart.)	—	—	45	—	—	—	—	—		Wait for Me
"Be the One"	2011	—	—	—	—	—	96	—	—	—	—		Destroyed.
"The Day"	2011	—	—	—	—	—	—	—	—	—	—		Destroyed.
"Lie Down in Darkness"	2011	—	—	—	—	77	—	—	—	—	—		Destroyed.
"The Right Thing"	2011	—	—	—	—	—	—	—	—	—	—		Destroyed.
"After"	2011	—	—	—	—	—	—	—	—	—	—		Destroyed.
"After the After" (vs. Joris Voorn)	2011	—	—	—	—	—	—	—	—	—	—		Toolroom Records Presents Miami 2012
"The Poison Tree"	2012	—	—	—	—	—	—	—	—	—	—		Destroyed.
"Extreme Ways (Bourne's Legacy)"	2012	—	—	—	—	—	—	—	—	—	—		The Bourne Legacy soundtrack
"Para" (with The Loops of Fury)	2013	—	—	—	—	—	—	—	—	—	—		Non-album single
"The Lonely Night" (featuring Mark Lanegan)	2013	—	—	—	—	—	—	—	—	—	—		Innocents
"A Case for Shame" (featuring Cold Specks)	2013	—	—	—	—	—	119	—	—	—	—		Innocents
"The Perfect Life" (featuring Wayne Coyne)	2013	—	—	—	—	78	164	—	—	—	—		Innocents
"Almost Home" (featuring Damien Jurado)	2014	—	—	—	—	—	—	73	—	—	—		Innocents
"Delay" (with Lucky Date)	2014	—	—	—	—	—	—	—	—	—	—		Non-album single
"Rio"	2014	—	—	—	—	—	—	—	—	—	—		Making Patterns Rhyme
"The Only Thing"	2014	—	—	—	—	—	—	—	—	—	—		Non-album singles
"Death Star" (with Darth & Vader)	2014	—	—	—	—	—	—	—	—	—	—		Non-album singles
"Ow" (with ACTi)	2014	—	—	—	—	—	—	—	—	—	—		Non-album singles
"The Light Is Clear in My Eyes" (with The Void Pacific Choir)	2015	—	—	—	—	—	—	—	—	—	—		These Systems; Are Failing
"Almost Loved" (with The Void Pacific Choir)	2015	—	—	—	—	—	—	—	—	—	—		These Systems; Are Failing
"Extreme Ways (Jason Bourne)"	2015	—	—	—	—	—	—	—	—	—	—		Jason Bourne soundtrack
"Trump Is on Your Side" (with The Heartland Choir)	2016	—	—	—	—	—	—	—	—	—	—		30 Days, 30 Songs
"Little Failure" (with The Void Pacific Choir)	2016	—	—	—	—	—	—	—	—	—	—		30 Days, 30 Songs
"Don't Leave Me" (with The Void Pacific Choir)	2016	—	—	—	—	—	—	—	—	—	—		These Systems; Are Failing
"Are You Lost in the World Like Me ?" (with The Void Pacific Choir)	2016	—	—	—	—	—	—	—	—	—	—		These Systems; Are Failing
"Erupt & Matter" (with The Void Pacific Choir)	2017	—	—	—	—	—	—	—	—	—	—		These Systems; Are Failing
"In This Cold Place" (with The Void Pacific Choir)	2017	—	—	—	—	—	—	—	—	—	—		More Fast Songs; About the Apocalypse
"Like a Motherless Child"	2017	—	—	—	—	88	—	—	—	—	—		Everything Was Beautiful, And Nothing Hurt
"Natural Blues" (Remix) (with Showtek)	2018	—	—	—	—	38	—	—	—	—	—		Non-album single
"Mere Anarchy"	2018	—	—	—	—	—	—	—	—	—	—		Everything Was Beautiful, And Nothing Hurt
"This Wild Darkness"	2018	—	—	—	—	—	—	—	—	—	—		Everything Was Beautiful, And Nothing Hurt
"ASAP Forever" (with ASAP Rocky)	2018	63	—	72	—	—	100	—	—	45	—	RIAA: Platinum; BPI: Silver	Testing
"Power Is Taken" (featuring D. H. Peligro)	2020	—	—	—	—	—	—	—	—	—	—		All Visible Objects
"Too Much Change" (featuring Apollo Jane)	2020	—	—	—	—	—	—	—	—	—	—		All Visible Objects
"My Only Love" (featuring Mindy Jones)	2020	—	—	—	—	—	—	—	—	—	—		All Visible Objects
"This Is Not Our World (Ce n'est pas notre monde)" (with Nicola Sirkis)	2022	—	—	—	—	—	—	—	—	—	—		Non-album singles
"Rescue Me"	2022	—	—	—	—	—	—	—	—	—	—		Non-album singles
"You & Me" (with Anfisa Letyago)	2024	—	—	—	—	—	—	—	—	—	—		Non-album singles
"—" denotes a recording that did not chart or was not released in that territory.

=== Promotional singles ===
List of singles as featured artist, with selected chart positions, showing year released and album name
Title	Year	Peak chart positions	Album
Title	Year	US Dance	Album
"What Love?"	1995	—	Everything Is Wrong
"Why Can't It Stop?"	1999	47	Hackers 3
"Everyday It's 1989" / "The Stars"	2007	—	Last Night
"Study War"	2009	—	Wait for Me
"Gone to Sleep" (acoustic)	2010	—	Non-album single
"Dark Dark Night" (with Midge Ure)	2015	—	Fragile
"Revolution" (with Julie Mintz)	2021	—	Non-album single
"Medusa" (with Aynzli Jones)	2022	—	Non-album single
"Fall Back" (with Akemi Fox)	2022	—	Non-album single
"On Air" (with serpentwithfeet)	2022	—	Non-album single
"Ache For" (with José James)	2022	—	Non-album single
"Transit" (with Gaidaa)	2023	—	Non-album single
"Should Sleep" (with J.P. Bimeni)	2023	—	Non-album single
"We're Going Wrong" (with Brie O'Banion)	2023	—	Non-album single
"—" denotes a recording that did not chart or was not released in that territory.

== Other charted and certified songs ==
List of other charted and certified songs, with selected chart positions, showing year released and album name
Title	Year	Peak chart positions	Certification	Album
Title	Year	FRA	Certification	Album
"Flower"	1999	—	BPI: Silver	Play
"One of These Mornings"	2002	156		18
"—" denotes a recording that did not chart or was not released in that territory.

== Music videos ==
List of music videos, showing year released and directors
Title	Year	Director(s)
"Go"	1991	Ondrej Rudavsky
"Next Is the E (I Feel It)"	1992	Damian Loeb
"Move (You Make Me Feel So Good)"	1993	Elizabeth Bailey
"Hymn" (version 1)	1994	Walter Stern
"Hymn" (version 2)	1994	Paul Yates
"Feeling So Real"	1994	Julie Hermelin
"Feeling So Real" (WestBam Mix)	1994	Julie Hermelin
"Everytime You Touch Me"	1995	Julie Hermelin
"Into the Blue"	1995	Dani Jacobs
"Bring Back My Happiness"	1995	Jim Tozzi
"That's When I Reach for My Revolver" (version 1)	1996	Lance Bangs
"That's When I Reach for My Revolver" (version 2)	1996	Karl Glozier
"That's When I Reach for My Revolver" (version 3)	1996	Dewey Nicks
"Come on Baby"	1996	James Hyman
"James Bond Theme (Moby's Re-Version)"	1997	Jonas Åkerlund
"Honey"	1998	Roman Coppola
"Run On" (version 1)	1999	Mike Mills
"Run On" (version 2)	1999	—N/a
"Bodyrock" (version 1)	1999	Fredrik Bond
"Bodyrock" (version 2)	1999	Fredrik Bond
"Bodyrock" (version 3)	1999	Steve Carr
"Why Does My Heart Feel So Bad?"	1999	Susi Wilkinson, Hotessa Laurence, Filipe Alçada
"Natural Blues" (version 1)	2000	David LaChapelle
"Natural Blues" (version 2)	2000	Susi Wilkinson, Hotessa Laurence, Filipe Alçada
"Porcelain" (version 1)	2000	Jonas Åkerlund
"Porcelain" (version 2)	2000	Nick Brandt
"South Side" (featuring Gwen Stefani)	2000	Joseph Kahn
"Find My Baby"	2000	Barnaby & Scott
"We Are All Made of Stars"	2002	Joseph Kahn
"Extreme Ways"	2002	Wayne Isham
"Extreme Ways (The Bourne Identity version)"	2002	Wayne Isham
"In This World"	2002	Style Wars
"In My Heart"	2002	Style Wars
"Sunday (The Day Before My Birthday)"	2003	Style Wars
"Jam for the Ladies" (version 1) (vs. Princess Superstar, featuring MC Lyte and Angie Stone)	2003	Simon and Jon
"Jam for the Ladies" (version 2) (vs. Princess Superstar, featuring MC Lyte and Angie Stone)	2003	Seb Ronjon
"Make Love Fuck War" (with Public Enemy)	2004	Giles Bury
"Lift Me Up" (version 1)	2005	Evan Bernard
"Lift Me Up" (live)	2005	—N/a
"Raining Again"	2005	Barnaby Roper
"Raining Again" (live)	2005	—N/a
"Spiders"	2005	Ben Weinstein
"Dream About Me"	2005	Hugo Ramirez
"Beautiful" (version 1)	2005	Laurent Briet
"Beautiful" (version 2)	2005	Ben Weinstein
"Slipping Away" (featuring Alison Moyet)	2006	Hugo Ramirez
"Slipping Away (Crier la vie)" (featuring Mylène Farmer)	2006	Hugo Ramirez
"Escapar (Slipping Away)" (featuring Amaral)	2006	Hugo Ramirez
"New York, New York" (version 1) (featuring Debbie Harry)	2006	Evan Bernard
"New York, New York" (version 2) (featuring Debbie Harry)	2006	Saint Reverend Jen
"Extreme Ways (Bourne's Ultimatum)"	2007	Paul Greengrass
"Alice"	2008	Andreas Nilsson
"Disco Lies"	2008	Evan Bernard
"Disco Lies" (Freemasons Remix)	2008	Evan Bernard
"I Love to Move in Here"	2008	Toben Seymour
"Ooh Yeah"	2008	Matteo Bernardini
"Shot in the Back of the Head"	2009	David Lynch
"Pale Horses"	2009	Elanna Allen
"Mistake" (version 1)	2009	Robert Powers
"Mistake" (version 2)	2009	Yoann Lemoine
"Mistake" (version 3)	2009	Katy Baugh
"One Time We Lived" (version 1)	2009	Robert Powers
"One Time We Lived" (version 2)	2009	Mark Pellington
"Wait for Me" (version 1)	2010	Nimrod Shapira
"Wait for Me" (version 2)	2010	Jessica Dimmock, Mark Jackson
"Wait for Me" (version 3)	2010	Maik Hempel
"Wait for Me" (version 4)	2010	Martin Winther
"Wait for Me" (version 5)	2010	Sergey Kazakov, Alexandr Lishnevski
"Wait for Me" (version 6)	2010	Anthony Honn
"Wait for Me" (version 7)	2010	Petr Tomaides
"Be the One"	2011	Moby
"Sevastopol"	2011	Moby
"Victoria Lucas"	2011	Moby
"The Day"	2011	Evan Bernard, Eyeball
"The Poison Tree"	2011	DLF Music Supporters
"Lie Down in Darkness"	2011	Institute for Eyes
"After" (version 1)	2011	Antonin Pevny
"After" (version 2)	2011	Alberto Gomez
"The Right Thing" (version 1)	2011	The Manship Society
"The Right Thing" (version 2)	2011	The Manship Society
"The Right Thing" (Sharam Jey Remix)	2011	The Manship Society
"Lacrimae"	2012	Moby
"Last Night"	2012	Marianna Palka
"The Lonely Night" (featuring Mark Lanegan)	2013	Colin Rich
"A Case for Shame" (featuring Cold Specks)	2013	Moby
"The Perfect Life Acoustic" (featuring Wayne Coyne)	2013	Evan Bernard
"The Perfect Life" (featuring Wayne Coyne)	2013	Evan Bernard
"Almost Home" (Best Friends Animal Society Lyric Video) (featuring Damien Jurado)	2013	Moby
"Almost Home" (version 2) (featuring Damien Jurado)	2014	Marcus Herring
"Almost Home" (version 3) (featuring Damien Jurado)	2014	—N/a
"Saints"	2014	Brad Hasse
"Delay" (featuring Lucky Date)	2014	—N/a
"Lucy and the Sky with Diamonds" (featuring The Flaming Lips and Miley Cyrus)	2014	—N/a
"The Only Thing" (featuring Julie Mintz)	2014	—N/a
"The Last Day" (featuring Skylar Grey)	2014	Erik Anders Lang
"Almost Home" (Sebastien Remix, version 1) (featuring Damien Jurado)	2014	Marcus Herring, Moby
"Almost Home" (Sebastien Remix, version 2) (featuring Damien Jurado)	2015	www.Fest300.com, Galen Oakes
"Almost Home" (MÖWE Remix) (featuring Damien Jurado)	2015	—N/a
"The Light Is Clear in My Eyes" (with The Void Pacific Choir)	2015	Moby & The Void Pacific Choir
"Almost Loved" (with The Void Pacific Choir)	2015	Moby & The Void Pacific Choir
"Go" (HI-LO Remix)	2016	—N/a
"Don't Leave Me" (with The Void Pacific Choir)	2016	Moby & The Void Pacific Choir
"These Systems Are Failing"	2016	Moby
"Are You Lost in the World Like Me?" (with The Void Pacific Choir)	2016	Steve Cutts
"Holy Sh*t (You've Got to Vote)"	2016	Funny or Die
"Hey! Hey!" (with The Void Pacific Choir)	2016	Moby & The Void Pacific Choir
"Break. Doubt" (with The Void Pacific Choir)	2016	Moby & The Void Pacific Choir
"I Wait for You" (with The Void Pacific Choir)	2016	Moby & The Void Pacific Choir
"And It Hurts" (with The Void Pacific Choir)	2016	Moby & The Void Pacific Choir
"Erupt & Matter" (with The Void Pacific Choir)	2017	Moby & The Void Pacific Choir
"A Simple Love" (with The Void Pacific Choir)	2017	Moby & The Void Pacific Choir
"A Happy Song" (with The Void Pacific Choir)	2017	Moby & The Void Pacific Choir
"It's So Hard to Say Goodbye" (with The Void Pacific Choir) (Performance Version)	2017	Moby & The Void Pacific Choir
"If Only a Correction of All We've Been" (with The Void Pacific Choir)	2017	Moby & The Void Pacific Choir
"In This Cold Place" (Performance Version) (with The Void Pacific Choir)	2017	Moby & The Void Pacific Choir
"All the Hurts We Made" (with The Void Pacific Choir)	2017	Moby & The Void Pacific Choir
"Trust" (with The Void Pacific Choir)	2017	Moby & The Void Pacific Choir
"There's Nothing Wrong with the World There's Something Wrong with Me" (with The Void Pacific Choir)	2017	Moby & The Void Pacific Choir
"A Softer War" (with The Void Pacific Choir)	2017	Moby & The Void Pacific Choir
"Silence" (with The Void Pacific Choir)	2017	Moby & The Void Pacific Choir
"In This Cold Place" (with The Void Pacific Choir)	2017	Steve Cutts
"It's So Hard to Say Goodbye" (with The Void Pacific Choir)	2017	Moby & The Void Pacific Choir
"Like A Motherless Child"	2017	Rob Gordon Bralver
"Natural Blues" (Lyric Video) (featuring Showtek)	2018	—N/a
"Mere Anarchy"	2018	Rob Gordon Bralver
"This Wild Darkness"	2018	Rob Gordon Bralver, Moby
"ASAP Forever" (featuring ASAP Rocky)	2018	Dexter Navy
"The Sorrow Tree (EastWest Session)"	2018	Rob Gordon Bralver
"Falling Rain and Light"	2018	—N/a
"I May Be Dead, But One Day the World Will Be Beautiful Again" (with Coyu)	2019	Stefano Bertelli
"Power Is Taken" (featuring D. H. Peligro)	2020	Gene Ivery
"Too Much Change" (featuring Apollo Jane)	2020	Moby, Lynd Ward
"My Only Love (Modeselektor Remix)"	2020	—N/a
"My Only Love"	2020	Paulo Garcia
"Natural Blues (Reprise)" (featuring Gregory Porter & Amythyst Kiah)	2021	Rob Gordon Bralver, Moby
"Why Does My Heart Feel So Bad (Reprise)" (featuring Apollo Jane & Deitrick Haddon)	2021	Steve Cutts
"Extreme Ways (Reprise)"	2021	Mike Formanski
"Medusa" (featuring Aynzli Jones)	2022	—N/a
"Medusa (Innocents Remix)" (featuring Aynzli Jones)	2022	—N/a
"This Is Not Our World (Ce n'est pas notre monde)" (featuring Nicola Sirkis)	2022	Jean-Charles Charavin
"Rescue Me"	2022	—N/a
"Fall Back (Ama Remix)" (featuring Akemi Fox)	2022	Mike Formanski
"Ache For" (featuring José James)	2022	Moby
"Transit" (featuring Gaidaa)	2023	Segraphy & Joachim Spruijt
"Walk With Me" (Resound NYC Version) (featuring Lady Blackbird)	2023	—N/a
"South Side" (Resound NYC Version) (featuring Ricky Wilson (singer))	2023	Moby, Lindsay Hicks & Michael Formanski
"Should Sleep" (featuring J.P. Bimeni)	2023	Moby & Mike Formanski
"We're Going Wrong" (featuring Brie O'Banion)	2023	—N/a
"You & Me" (featuring Anfisa Letyago)	2024	—N/a
"Dark Days" (featuring Lady Blackbird)	2024	Moby & Mike Formanski
"Where Is Your Pride?" (featuring Benjamin Zephaniah)	2024	Moby & Mike Formanski
"Feelings Come Undone" (featuring Raquel Rodriguez)	2024	Moby & Mike Formanski
"Sweet Moon" (featuring Choklate)	2024	Moby & Mike Formanski
"Precious Mind" (featuring India Carney)	2024	Moby

== Remixes ==
List of remixes, showing year released and original artists
Title	Year	Original artist
"Who Is It" (IHS Mix, P-Man Dub, Lakeside Dub, Raw Mercy Dub and Tribal Version)	1991	Michael Jackson
"Miserablism" (Electro Mix)	1991	Pet Shop Boys
"Chorus" (Vegan Mix)	1991	Erasure
"Tan Ta Ra" (Moby Remix)	1991	LFO
"Beat It" (Moby's Sub Mix)	1992	Michael Jackson
"Stella" (Barracuda Mix and Electro Mix)	1992	Jam and Spoon
"Everybody in the Place" (Dance Hall Version)	1992	The Prodigy
"Speed Freak" (Moby Mutation)	1992	Orbital
"You Gotta Believe" (Moby's Love of God Mix and Moby's Sweet Mix)	1992	Fierce Ruling Diva
"Fractal Zoom" (Mary's Birthday Mix and Naive Mix)	1992	Brian Eno
"Revolution Earth" (Co2 Mix)	1992	The B-52's
"Is That You Mo-Dean?" (Interdimension Mix, Harpapella, and Liquid Sky Dub)	1992	The B-52's
"Good Stuff" (Schottische Mix)	1992	The B-52's
"Movin' On" (Waterfront Mix)	1993	The Other Two
"Bam Bam Bam" (Paul Yates Mix and Moby's Dub Mix)	1994	WestBam
"Lost Again" (Moby's Hands On Yello Mix)	1995	Yello
"1979" (Moby Mix)	1996	The Smashing Pumpkins
"Dusty" (Moby Mix)	1996	Soundgarden
"Until It Sleeps" (Herman Melville Mix)	1996	Metallica
"Beetlebum" (Moby's Minimal House Mix and Moby's Mix)	1997	Blur
"Falling in Love (Is Hard on the Knees)" (Moby Flawed Mix and Moby Fucked Mix)	1997	Aerosmith
"Grave Ride" (Moby Mix)	1997	John Lydon
"Dead Man Walking" (Moby Mix 1)	1997	David Bowie
"Souvenir" (Moby Remix)	1998	Orchestral Manoeuvres in the Dark
"Alive" (Moby Remix)	2000	Beastie Boys
"What's Going On" (Moby Remix)	2001	Artists Against AIDS Worldwide
"Sunday" (Moby Remix)	2002	David Bowie
"Rock Your Body Rock" (Moby Remix)	2003	Ferry Corsten
"I'm Free" (Moby Remix)	2006	The Rolling Stones
"Beyond the Sea" (Moby and Oscar the Punk Remix)	2006	Bobby Darin
"God Bless the Child" (Moby and Oscar the Remix)	2006	Billie Holiday
"The Son of Flynn" (Moby Remix)	2011	Daft Punk
"Wait & See" (Moby Remix)	2011	Holy Ghost!
"Noah's Ark" (Moby Remix)	2011	David Lynch
"Y" (Moby Remix)	2011	iamamiwhoami
"Do It Again" (Moby Remix and Moby Basement Mix)	2014	Röyksopp and Robyn
"The Big Dream" (Moby Reversion)	2014	David Lynch
"Salt" (Moby Remix)	2017	Kita Klane
"Break" (Moby Remix)	2017	Adlt Vdeo
"Vault" (Moby Remix)	2018	Pendulum
"(Do Not) Stand in the Shadows" (Moby Remix)	2018	Billy Idol
"Burns" (Moby Remix)	2018	George FitzGerald
"Black Myself" (Moby Remix)	2021	Amythyst Kiah
"In My Heart" (Moby Remix)	2023	Gregory Porter
