= Play: The B Sides =

Compilation album by Moby
- Released: October 24, 2000
- Length: 60:34
- Label: Mute; V2
- Producer: Moby

Moby chronology
MobySongs 1993–1998 (2000)	Play: The B Sides (2000)	18 (2002)

Play: The B Sides is a compilation album by American electronica musician Moby. It was released on October 24, 2000. The album's songs are outtakes from his 1999 album Play which were subsequently released as B-sides across various singles from the album.

Moby explains: "The B Sides is a collection of songs that weren't quite appropriate for Play, but that I still love enough to release as B-sides. Some of these songs might not be instantly accessible, but I (immodestly) think they are all quite special." In the liner notes, Moby admits that the songs would not have been given a wide release if not for the overwhelming success of Play.

The song "Flower" was featured on the soundtrack for the 2000 film Gone in 60 Seconds and is also used for the Bring Sally Up exercise challenge, with participants doing squats, push-ups or burpees up or down along with the lyrics of the song. “Flower” is also a walk-up song used by Major League Baseball player Bryce Harper. The song "Memory Gospel" was used on the soundtracks for the films Get Carter, 40 Days and 40 Nights and Southland Tales as well as the documentary Earthlings.

== Critical reception ==
Professional ratings
Review scores
Source	Rating
AllMusic	3/5 stars
Rolling Stone	3.5/5 stars

AllMusic's John Bush wrote that the B-sides are "distinctly inferior to what was heard on Play — which proves nothing much more than the fact that Moby is a good editor as well as a great producer." Neva Chonin from Rolling Stone said it was "more of a meditative tone poem" than the "millennial time signature" that was Play.

== Track listing ==
All tracks are written by Moby.

No.	Title	Original release:	Length
1.	"Flower"	B-side of "Find My Baby"	3:25
2.	"Sunday"	B-side of "Run On (Extended)"	5:03
3.	"Memory Gospel"	B-side of "Honey"	6:42
4.	"Whispering Wind"	B-side of "Natural Blues"	6:03
5.	"Summer"	B-side of "Porcelain"	5:56
6.	"Spirit"	B-side of "Run On"	4:08
7.	"Flying Foxes"	B-side of "Why Does My Heart Feel So Bad?"	6:16
8.	"Sunspot"	B-side of "Bodyrock"	6:49
9.	"Flying Over the Dateline"	B-side of "Porcelain"	4:48
10.	"Running"	B-side of "Run On"	7:05
11.	"The Sun Never Stops Setting"	B-side of "South Side"	4:19
Total length:			60:34

B-sides not featured on the album:

- "Ain't Never Learned" from the single "South Side"
- "Arp" from the single "Bodyrock"
- "Down Slow (Full Length Version)" from the maxi-single "Run On (Extended)"
- "Micronesia" from the single "Honey"
- "Princess" from the single "Why Does My Heart Feel So Bad?"
- "Sick in the System" from the single "Natural Blues"

== Personnel ==
Credits for Play: The B Sides adapted from album liner notes.

- Moby – engineering, mixing, production, writing, illustration
- Corinne Day – photography
- Elizabeth Young – photography

== Charts ==
Chart (2000)	Peak position
Scottish Albums (OCC)	24
UK Albums (OCC)	24
US Billboard 200	165
US Top Dance Albums (Billboard)	14
