= Reprise (Moby album) =

Studio album by Moby
- Released: May 28, 2021
- Recorded: 2021
- Studios: Moby's home studio in Los Feliz, Los Angeles; East-West Studios, Los Angeles; Budapest, Hungary
- Length: 70:32
- Label: Deutsche Grammophon
- Producer: Moby

Moby chronology
Live Ambients – Improvised Recordings Vol. 1 (2020)	Reprise (2021)	Ambient 23 (2023)

Professional ratings
Aggregate scores
Source	Rating
AnyDecentMusic?	6.7/10
Metacritic	76/100
Review scores
Source	Rating
AllMusic	4.5/5 stars
The Independent	4/5 stars
Irish Examiner	4/5 stars
laut.de	2/5 stars
Musikexpress	3.5/6 stars
musicOMH	2.5/5 stars
NME	3/5 stars
Uncut	7/10

Reprise is the nineteenth studio album by American musician Moby, released on May 28, 2021, by Deutsche Grammophon. It features orchestral and acoustic arrangements of songs from his career, performed by the Budapest Art Orchestra, a string quartet, along with multiple guest artists.

== Background ==
The album originates to when Moby attended a Bryan Ferry concert in Los Angeles, where a booker for the Los Angeles Philharmonic offered him the chance of performing live with the orchestra. This led to Moby's first ever concert with an orchestra, which took place in October 2018 at the Walt Disney Concert Hall with conductor Gustavo Dudamel and Mayor Eric Garcetti on piano. A representative from Deutsche Grammophon approached Moby backstage with the idea of making an orchestral album, and he leapt at the idea. About the idea of his own songs re-recorded the classical way, Moby said, "Sometimes you just want direct, honest communication. Using acoustic and classical instruments allows you to increase the chances that direct vulnerable communication will be there. I don't know if I achieved that with Reprise, but that was the goal."

After selecting a group of songs from his discography and preparing basic orchestral arrangements to accompany them at his home studio in Los Feliz, Los Angeles, initial sessions took place at East-West Studios in Los Angeles where tracks featuring piano, guitar, percussion, drums, and from a chamber orchestra were put down. When it came to recording the final orchestral parts, orchestras based in London, Berlin, and Memphis, Tennessee were considered but decided against. In the end, the Budapest Art Orchestra was chosen and Moby decided not to attend the sessions in Budapest in person as he preferred to hand over his arrangements to a professional orchestrator.

On March 26, 2021, Moby announced the album, and released "Porcelain" on his YouTube channel on the same day.

== Critical reception ==
The Independent critic recalled that “the original tracks felt as though they were recorded under the adrenalin of artificial lights, but these reworkings are flooded with daylight. It’s as though Moby is opening the curtains after a party, smoothing down the soft furnishings and carefully placing the crockery in the sink. The tracks lose their tension but gain an orderly, classical frame.”

According to Gary Ryan of NME, Reprise is “full of dignified reworkings that don’t offer too many surprises”. “By drilling down to the compositional basics of his songs and then divesting them of their interesting production flourishes, [Moby] perversely makes them feel more like aural wallpaper.”

== Track listing ==
All tracks are written by Moby, except where noted.

Reprise track listing
No.	Title	Writer(s)	Original versions on:	Length
1.	"Everloving"		Play (1999)	3:18
2.	"Natural Blues" (with Gregory Porter and Amythyst Kiah)	Moby; Alan Lomax; Vera Hall	Play (1999)	4:30
3.	"Go"	Moby; Angelo Badalamenti	Moby (1992)	3:44
4.	"Porcelain" (with Jim James)		Play (1999)	5:54
5.	"Extreme Ways"		18 (2002)	5:00
6.	"Heroes" (with Mindy Jones)	David Bowie; Brian Eno		5:18
7.	"God Moving Over the Face of the Waters" (with Víkingur Ólafsson)		Everything Is Wrong (1995)	7:42
8.	"Why Does My Heart Feel So Bad?" (with Apollo Jane and Deitrick Haddon)		Play (1999)	4:38
9.	"The Lonely Night" (with Mark Lanegan and Kris Kristofferson)	Moby; Mark Lanegan	Innocents (2013)	5:43
10.	"We Are All Made of Stars"		18 (2002)	6:01
11.	"Lift Me Up"		Hotel (2005)	5:22
12.	"The Great Escape" (with Nataly Dawn, Alice Skye, and Luna Li)	Moby; Maria Taylor; Orenda Fink	18 (2002)	2:51
13.	"Almost Home" (with Novo Amor, Mindy Jones, and Darlingside)	Moby; Damien Jurado	Innocents (2013)	5:28
14.	"The Last Day" (with Skylar Grey and Darlingside)	Moby; Skylar Grey	Innocents (2013)	5:13
Total length:				70:42

Notes

- All tracks are noted as "Reprise Version".

== Personnel ==
Musicians

- Moby – bass (1, 2, 5, 6, 8, 10, 11, 13, 14), guitars (1, 2, 5, 6, 8–14), piano (1, 3, 6, 8–10, 13, 14), synthesizer (2, 3, 6, 8, 11, 13), percussion (3), vocals (4, 5, 10, 11, 13), organ (5, 9), Rhodes (5), synth bass (10)
- Joseph Trapanese – conductor
- Tripp Beam – drums (1–5, 8–11, 13, 14)
- Budapest Art Orchestra – orchestra
- Apollo Jane – background vocals (2, 10), vocals (8)
- The Samples – choir (2, 8, 10)
- Jason White – choir conductor (2, 8, 10)
- Alex Acuña – percussion (2–4, 8, 10)
- Amythyst Kiah – vocals (2)
- Gregory Porter – vocals (2)
- Jim James – vocals (4)
- Mindy Jones – vocals (6), background vocals (9, 10, 13)
- Víkingur Ólafsson – piano (7)
- Deitrick Haddon – additional vocals (8)
- Kris Kristofferson – vocals (9)
- Mark Lanegan – vocals (9)
- Daron Murphy – background vocals (10)
- Laura Dawn – background vocals (10)
- Alice Skye – vocals (12)
- Luna Li – vocals (12)
- Nataly Dawn – vocals (12)
- Darlingside – vocals (13, 14)
- Novo Amor – vocals (13)
- Skylar Grey – vocals (14)

Technical

- Moby – producer, recording engineer
- Jonathan Nesvadba – co-producer, recording engineer
- Joseph Trapanese – orchestra producer
- Mark Wilder – mastering engineer
- Alan Meyerson – mixer
- Sturla Mio Þórisson – recording engineer (7)

== Charts ==
Chart performance for Reprise
Chart (2021)	Peak position
Australian Albums (ARIA)	32
Austrian Albums (Ö3 Austria)	3
Belgian Albums (Ultratop Flanders)	5
Belgian Albums (Ultratop Wallonia)	4
Croatian International Albums (HDU)	1
Czech Albums (ČNS IFPI)	20
Dutch Albums (Album Top 100)	8
French Albums (SNEP)	30
German Albums (Offizielle Top 100)	4
Irish Albums (Official Charts)	23
Italian Albums (FIMI)	24
New Zealand Albums (RMNZ)	40
Polish Albums (ZPAV)	37
Portuguese Albums (AFP)	4
Scottish Albums (Official Charts)	10
Swiss Albums (Schweizer Hitparade)	1
UK Albums (Official Charts)	21
US Top Album Sales (Billboard)	49
US Top Classical Albums (Billboard)	2
