= Payneville, Alabama =

Unincorporated community in Alabama, United States

- Unincorporated community
- Location within the state of Alabama Payneville, Alabama (the United States)
- Coordinates: 32°36′48″N 88°20′48″W
- Country: United States
- State: Alabama
- County: Sumter
- Elevation: 190 ft (58 m)
- Time zone: UTC-6 (Central (CST))
  - Summer (DST): UTC-5 (CDT)
- Area codes: 205, 659
- GNIS feature ID: 124515

Payneville is an unincorporated community in Sumter County, Alabama, United States.

== History ==
Payneville was among the first towns settled in Sumter County. It was named for Ranson Payne. Charles J. Puckett became Paynesville's first postmaster in 1837. The Payneville post office operated from 1839 to 1867.

== Notable people ==
- Vera Hall, blues and folk singer
