= Play (Moby album) =

1999 studio album by Moby

Studio album by Moby
- Released: May 17, 1999
- Recorded: August 1997 – Early 1999
- Studio: Moby's home studio (Manhattan)
- Genres: Electronica; downtempo; techno; ambient; breakbeat; electropop; roots; blues
- Length: 63:18
- Labels: Mute; V2
- Producer: Moby

Moby chronology
I Like to Score (1997)	Play (1999)	MobySongs 1993–1998 (2000)

Singles from Play
- 1. "Honey" Released: August 24, 1998; 2. "Run On" Released: April 26, 1999; 3. "Bodyrock" Released: July 12, 1999; 4. "Why Does My Heart Feel So Bad?" Released: October 11, 1999; 5. "Natural Blues" Released: March 6, 2000; 6. "Porcelain" Released: April 25, 2000; 7. "South Side" Released: October 10, 2000; 8. "Find My Baby" Released: October 16, 2000

Play is the fifth studio album by American electronic musician Moby. It was released on May 17, 1999, through Mute Records internationally and V2 Records in North America. Recording of the album began in mid-1997, following the release of Moby's fourth album, Animal Rights (1996), which deviated from his electronica style; Moby's goal for Play was to return to electronica, blending downtempo with blues and roots music samples. Originally intended to be his final record, the album was recorded at Moby's home studio in Manhattan.

While some of Moby's earlier work had garnered critical and commercial success within the electronic dance music scene, Play was both a critical success and a commercial phenomenon. Initially issued to lackluster sales, it topped numerous album charts months after its release and was certified platinum in more than 20 countries. The album introduced Moby to a worldwide mainstream audience, not only through a large number of hit singles that helped the album to dominate worldwide charts for two years, but also through unprecedented licensing of its songs in films, television shows, and commercials. Play eventually became one of the biggest-selling electronica albums of all time, with over 12 million copies sold worldwide.

In 2003 and 2012, Play was ranked number 341 on Rolling Stone magazine's list of the 500 greatest albums of all time.

== Background ==
The second half of the 1990s saw Moby in career turmoil after years of success in the techno scene. The release in 1996 of Animal Rights, a dark, eclectic, guitar-fueled record built around the punk and metal records that he loved as a teenager, proved a critical and commercial disaster that left him contemplating quitting music altogether. He explained: "I was opening for Soundgarden and getting shit thrown at me every night onstage. I did my own tour and was playing to roughly fifty people a night." However, positive reactions to Animal Rights from fellow artists such as Terence Trent D'Arby, Axl Rose, and Bono inspired Moby to continue producing music.

Moby started work on Play in August 1997 and put it on hold several times to complete touring obligations. At the time, he planned on making the album his last before ending his career. Recording sessions took place at Moby's Mott Street home studio in Manhattan, New York. Play was delayed due to Moby's dissatisfaction with the initial mix of the album that he had produced at home. A second mixing was completed at an outside studio before attempts at two other studios displayed similar results. After returning home and producing a mix by himself, Moby felt happy with it. Ultimately, he said that he "wasted a lot of time and money" on the previous unsatisfactory mixing sessions. Moby recalled a moment from March 1999, after Play had been mixed and sequenced, where he sat on the grass in Sara Delano Roosevelt Park: "I was sitting by the little tire swings that had been chewed apart by the pit bulls [...] thinking to myself, 'When this record comes out, it will be the end of my career. I should start thinking about what else I can do.'" At that point, he considered returning to school to study architecture.

When Moby finished recording Play, there was no sign that the album would perform any differently than Animal Rights. While he remained signed to the label Mute, which issued his records in the United Kingdom, Elektra had dropped him from its roster of artists following the release of Animal Rights, leaving him without an outlet to release Play in the United States. According to Moby, he shopped the record to every major label, from Warner Bros. to Sony to RCA, and was rejected every time. After V2 finally picked it up, his publicist sent the record to journalists, many of whom declined to listen to it. Moby's manager Eric Härle said that their original goal was to sell 250,000 copies, which was what Everything Is Wrong (1995), Moby's biggest-selling album at the time, had sold.

== Music ==
According to Spin magazine's Will Hermes, Play was "the high-water mark for populist electronica" and a "millennial roots and blues masterwork", while John Bush from AllMusic said it balanced Moby's early electronica sound with the emergent breakbeat style of techno. Chicago Sun-Times critic Jim DeRogatis noted its incorporation of such disparate musical influences as early blues, African-American folk music, gospel, hip-hop, disco, and techno, "all within the context of his own distinctly melodic ambient stylings." Complex described Play as "an organic downtempo masterpiece" that fused live studio recordings and "found sounds".

Play was particularly notable for its use of samples from field recordings collected by Alan Lomax and compiled on the 1993 box set Sounds of the South: A Musical Journey from the Georgia Sea Islands to the Mississippi Delta. Moby was introduced to the box set through a friend, Gregor Ehrlich, who loaned the CDs to him. The Play tracks "Honey", "Find My Baby", and "Natural Blues" were composed by Moby around vocal hooks sampled from songs by the folk singers Bessie Jones, Boy Blue, and Vera Hall, respectively, that were featured on the collection. Apart from the Lomax material, Moby also used samples of old gospel recordings on "Why Does My Heart Feel So Bad?" and "Run On". In the liner notes for Play, Moby gave "special thanks to the Lomaxes and all of the archivists and music historians whose field recordings made this record possible."

Elsewhere, Play is informed by more contemporary music styles. "Bodyrock", which Moby called "essentially a hip-hop song", features samples of rappers Spoonie Gee and the Treacherous Three. "Machete" was inspired by EBM acts such as Front 242 and Meat Beat Manifesto. "Porcelain" and "South Side" are both anchored by Moby's own lead vocals, and are among several songs on the album that spotlight his trademark "evocative, melancholy" techno sound, according to Bush. The remaining tracks are primarily instrumental in nature, and Moby cited these as his favorites from Play. The latter half of the album is mostly composed of these instrumentals, which are more downcast in mood and less driven by samples. Moby noted that he intentionally sequenced the album such that "it starts off energetic and then by the end dissolves into an opiated haze."

== Release and promotion ==
Play was released on May 17, 1999, by Mute, and on June 1, 1999, by V2. On its release, it underperformed commercially. The record debuted at number 33 on the UK Albums Chart, but thereafter descended the chart. Moby recounted that the first show he played in support of Play, at the basement of the Virgin Megastore in Union Square, was attended by only around 40 people. Further damaging the album's commercial prospects, Play's songs received little airplay from radio stations or television networks such as MTV.

Moby and his management, however, soon found another approach to increasing public exposure of Play, by way of licensing its songs for use in films, television shows, and commercials. According to Moby, their goal "was simply to get people to hear the music". "Most of the licenses weren't particularly lucrative," he noted, "but they enabled people to hear the music because otherwise the record wasn't being heard." Eric Härle clarified that although many people believed the songs were pitched for advertisements as part of the marketing campaign for an album that did not fit with mainstream radio, the licensing actually came about as a result of agencies asking for permission to use the music as soundbeds; he attributed the music's popularity to its evocative and emotional nature. Despite the heavy licensing, each request was nevertheless carefully vetted and more requests were turned down than accepted. Moby's manager Barry Taylor recalled that after the producers of a British television program sent a fax requesting for permission to use "7", the only track from Play that had yet to be licensed, "we celebrated."

The week Play was released, it sold, worldwide around 6,000 copies. Eleven months after Play was released, it was selling 150,000 copies a week. I was on tour constantly, drunk pretty much the entire time and it was just a blur. And then all of a sudden movie stars started coming to my concerts and I started getting invited to fancy parties and suddenly the journalists who wouldn't return my publicist's calls were talking about doing cover stories. It was a really odd phenomenon.

— Moby

The licensing approach proved successful in increasing Play's visibility, and subsequently radio and MTV airplay for the album's songs began to pick up. The album re-entered the top 100 of the UK Albums Chart in January 2000, slowly climbing positions and finally reaching number one three months later, spending five weeks at the top. It remained on the chart for the remainder of 2000, and in the UK was the fifth best-selling album, as well as the best-selling independent album, of that year. By October 2000, Play had attained platinum certifications in 17 countries and topped the charts in seven. While it only reached number 38 on the American Billboard 200 chart, the album sold over two million copies in the US, enjoying steady sales for months and constant popularity. Play has been certified platinum in more than 20 countries, and with over 12 million copies sold worldwide, it is the biggest-selling electronica album of all time.

Eight singles were released from Play: "Honey" on August 24, 1998, "Run On" on April 26, 1999, "Bodyrock" on July 12, 1999, "Why Does My Heart Feel So Bad?" on October 11, 1999, "Natural Blues" on March 6, 2000, "Porcelain" on April 25, 2000, "South Side" on October 10, 2000, and "Find My Baby" on October 16, 2000. The first six all reached the top 40 of the UK Singles Chart. "South Side", which for its single release was remixed to include additional vocals from No Doubt's lead singer Gwen Stefani, became Moby's first single to chart on the Billboard Hot 100, where it peaked at number 14. Numerous music videos were commissioned for the album's singles, directed by filmmakers such as Jonas Åkerlund ("Porcelain"), Roman Coppola ("Honey"), Joseph Kahn ("South Side"), and David LaChapelle ("Natural Blues").

In October 2000, the compilation album Play: The B Sides was released, containing tracks released as B-sides on the singles from Play. A DVD titled Play: The DVD was released in July 2001. It features most of the music videos for Play's singles; an 88-minute megamix of various remixes of the album's songs, accompanied by animated visuals; a performance by Moby on Later... with Jools Holland; a compilation of footage shot by Moby on tour titled Give an Idiot a Camcorder; an interactive component that allows users to remix "Bodyrock" and "Natural Blues"; and a bonus CD containing the aforementioned megamix. Play: The DVD was nominated for Best Long Form Music Video at the 44th Grammy Awards.

== Critical reception ==
Professional ratings
Aggregate scores
Source	Rating
Metacritic	84/100
Review scores
Source	Rating
AllMusic	4.5/5 stars
Chicago Sun-Times	4/4 stars
Christgau's Consumer Guide	A+
Entertainment Weekly	A−
The Guardian	4/5 stars
NME	8/10
Pitchfork	5.0/10
Q	4/5 stars
Rolling Stone	4/5 stars
Spin	9/10

Play received widespread critical acclaim upon release. On Metacritic, which assigns a normalized rating to reviews from mainstream critics, the album has a score of 84 out of 100 based on 20 reviews, indicating "universal acclaim".

Reviewing for The Village Voice in 1999, Robert Christgau said the album's sampled recordings would not "shout anywhere near as loud and clear" without Moby's "ministrations—his grooves, his pacing, his textures, his harmonies, sometimes his tunes, and mostly his grooves, which honor not just dance music but the entire rock tradition it's part of." He deemed the album "no more focused" than Moby's previous "brilliant messes" but still "one of those records whose drive to beauty should move anybody who just likes, well, music itself." In his review for AllMusic, John Bush stated that Play showed Moby "balancing his sublime early sound with the breakbeat techno evolution of the '90s." Barry Walters from Rolling Stone said "the ebb and flow of eighteen concise, contrasting cuts writes a story about Moby's beautifully conflicted interior world while giving the outside planet beats and tunes on which to groove." David Browne, writing in Entertainment Weekly, felt that despite some needed editing, Moby's graceful soundscapes filter out the original recordings' antiquated sound and "make the singers' heartache and hope seem fresh again." In a more critical appraisal, Pitchfork reviewer Brent DiCrescenzo believed the "raw magnetism" of the sampled recordings was lost to "innate digital recording techniques", resulting in music that was "fun and functional, yet disposable."

At the end of 1999, Play was voted the year's best album in the Pazz & Jop, an annual poll of American critics published in The Village Voice. Christgau, the poll's supervisor, ranked it second best on his own year-end list. The following year, the album was nominated for Best Alternative Music Performance at the 42nd Grammy Awards. Since then, it has been named one of the greatest albums of all time. NPR named Play one of the 300 most important American records of the 20th century, as determined by the network's news and cultural programming staff, prominent critics, and scholars. It was ranked number 341 on the 2003 and 2012 editions of Rolling Stone's list of the 500 greatest albums of all time, and in 2005, a panel of recording industry pundits assembled by Channel 4 voted Play the 63rd-best album ever. The album was also included in the book 1001 Albums You Must Hear Before You Die.

== Legacy ==
According to Rolling Stone, "Play wasn't the first album to make a rock star out of an insular techno nerdnik, but it was the first to make one a pop sensation. [...] Play made postmodernism cuddly, slowly but surely striking a chord with critics and record-buyers alike." Ranking it among the best electropop albums, Classic Pop suggested that "perhaps more than any album ever, Play propelled electronic music into the mainstream consciousness." Wired said that the songs on Play—which became the first album ever to have all of its tracks licensed for use in films, television shows, or commercials—"have been sold hundreds of times [...] a licensing venture so staggeringly lucrative that the album was a financial success months before it reached its multi-platinum sales total." In a retrospective piece for Wondering Sound, Robert Christgau wrote:

Although some techno futurists still disparage the gorgeous Play, it qualified as a futurist work simply by redefining the concept of "commercial." Clubs would never take a CD mega, and no way could these anonymously sung tracks crack any hit-based radio format. So Moby's handlers swamped the mass market through the side door, placing swatches of all 18 songs (most many times) on movie and TV soundtracks and in ads for the likes of Volkswagen, Baileys Irish Cream and American Express. FM exposure followed. But the main reason this album will sound familiar the way Beethoven's Ninth does to a classical ignoramus is that little bits of it have seeped into most Americans' brains. For this be grateful, because those bits are intensely pleasurable as melody or texture or sometimes beat, and because Moby has ordered, paced, and segued them and their intimate surroundings into something that suggests a surging and receding whole. A Treacherous Three rap powers "Bodyrock," but most of the identifiable sources are little-known blues and gospel singers first archived by folklorist Alan Lomax. Folk purists might well claim this re-use cheapens them. But here's betting musical folk like the singers themselves are plenty proud somewhere.

English singer-songwriter Adele cited Play as an influence on her 2015 album 25, saying: "There's something that I find really holy about that Play album... The way it makes me feel. Even though there's nothing holy or preachy about it. There's just something about it—maybe the gospel samples. But it makes me feel alive, that album, still. And I remember my mum having that record."

== Track listing ==
All tracks are written by Moby, except where noted.

No.	Title	Writer(s)	Length
1.	"Honey"	Moby; Bessie Jones; Alan Lomax	3:28
2.	"Find My Baby"	Moby; Willie Jones	4:00
3.	"Porcelain"		4:01
4.	"Why Does My Heart Feel So Bad?"		4:24
5.	"South Side"		3:50
6.	"Rushing"		3:01
7.	"Bodyrock"	Moby; Gabriel Jackson; Bobby Robinson	3:36
8.	"Natural Blues"	Moby; Vera Hall; Lomax	4:14
9.	"Machete"		3:38
10.	"7"		1:02
11.	"Run On"		3:45
12.	"Down Slow"		1:35
13.	"If Things Were Perfect"		4:18
14.	"Everloving"		3:26
15.	"Inside"		4:49
16.	"Guitar Flute & String"		2:09
17.	"The Sky Is Broken"		4:20
18.	"My Weakness"		3:42
Total length:			63:18

Sample credits

- "Honey" contains samples of "Sometimes" by Bessie Jones.
- "Find My Baby" contains samples of "Joe Lee's Rock" by Boy Blue.
- "Bodyrock" contains samples of "Love Rap" by Spoonie Gee and the Treacherous Three.
- "Natural Blues" contains samples of "Trouble So Hard" by Vera Hall.
- "Run On" contains samples of "Run On for a Long Time" by Bill Landford and the Landfordairs.

== Personnel ==
Credits are adapted from the album's liner notes.

- Moby – engineering, mixing, production, instruments, vocals on "Porcelain", "South Side", "Machete", "If Things Were Perfect", and "The Sky Is Broken"
- Pilar Basso – additional vocals on "Porcelain"
- Mario Caldato Jr. – mixing on "Honey"
- Corinne Day – photography
- Graeme Durham – mastering
- I Monster – mixing on "Natural Blues"
- Ysabel zu Innhausen und Knyphausen – design
- Reggie Matthews – additional vocals on "If Things Were Perfect"
- Nikki D – additional vocals on "Bodyrock"
- The Shining Light Gospel Choir – vocals on "Why Does My Heart Feel So Bad?"

== Charts ==
=== Weekly charts ===
Weekly chart performance for Play
Chart (1999–2002)	Peak position
Australian Albums (ARIA)	1
Australian Dance Albums (ARIA)	1
Austrian Albums (Ö3 Austria)	7
Belgian Albums (Ultratop Flanders)	3
Belgian Alternative Albums (Ultratop Flanders)	3
Belgian Albums (Ultratop Wallonia)	4
Canadian Albums (Billboard)	11
Czech Albums (ČNS IFPI)	4
Danish Albums (Hitlisten)	34
Dutch Albums (Album Top 100)	5
European Top 100 Albums (Music & Media)	2
Finnish Albums (Suomen virallinen lista)	18
French Albums (SNEP)	1
German Albums (Offizielle Top 100)	21
Irish Albums (IRMA)	1
Italian Albums (FIMI)	4
New Zealand Albums (RMNZ)	1
Norwegian Albums (VG-lista)	2
Portuguese Albums (AFP)	5
Scottish Albums (Official Charts)	1
Swedish Albums (Sverigetopplistan)	14
Swiss Albums (Schweizer Hitparade)	12
UK Albums (Official Charts)	1
UK Dance Albums (OCC)	2
UK Independent Albums (Official Charts)	1
US Billboard 200	38

=== Year-end charts ===
1999 year-end chart performance for Play
Chart (1999)	Position
New Zealand Albums (RMNZ)	39
UK Albums (OCC)	199

2000 year-end chart performance for Play
Chart (2000)	Position
Australian Albums (ARIA)	10
Belgian Albums (Ultratop Flanders)	10
Belgian Albums (Ultratop Wallonia)	14
Canadian Albums (Nielsen SoundScan)	16
Dutch Albums (Album Top 100)	20
European Top 100 Albums (Music & Media)	2
French Albums (SNEP)	3
German Albums (Offizielle Top 100)	37
Italian Albums (FIMI)	11
New Zealand Albums (RMNZ)	1
Norwegian Spring Period Albums (VG-lista)	3
Norwegian Summer Period Albums (VG-lista)	3
Singaporean English Albums (SPVA)	5
Swedish Albums & Compilations (Sverigetopplistan)	71
Swiss Albums (Schweizer Hitparade)	23
UK Albums (OCC)	5
US Billboard 200	69

2001 year-end chart performance for Play
Chart (2001)	Position
Australian Albums (ARIA)	65
Australian Dance Albums (ARIA)	10
Belgian Albums (Ultratop Flanders)	29
Belgian Alternative Albums (Ultratop Flanders)	13
Belgian Albums (Ultratop Wallonia)	25
Canadian Albums (Nielsen SoundScan)	61
Dutch Albums (Album Top 100)	51
European Top 100 Albums (Music & Media)	56
French Albums (SNEP)	53
UK Albums (OCC)	92
US Billboard 200	111

2002 year-end chart performance for Play
Chart (2002)	Position
Australian Dance Albums (ARIA)	15
Canadian Albums (Nielsen SoundScan)	175
Canadian Alternative Albums (Nielsen SoundScan)	55
French Albums (SNEP)	130
UK Albums (OCC)	190

2004 year-end chart performance for Play
Chart (2004)	Position
Belgian Mid Price Albums (Ultratop Flanders)	33

2005 year-end chart performance for Play
Chart (2005)	Position
Belgian Mid Price Albums (Ultratop Flanders)	25
Belgian Mid Price Albums (Ultratop Wallonia)	25

=== Decade-end charts ===
Decade-end chart performance for Play
Chart (2000–2009)	Position
Australian Albums (ARIA)	44
UK Albums (OCC)	36

== Certifications and sales ==
Certifications and sales for Play
Region	Certification	Certified units/sales
Australia (ARIA)	4× Platinum	280,000^{^}
Austria (IFPI Austria)	Gold	25,000^{*}
Belgium (BRMA)	2× Platinum	100,000^{*}
Canada (Music Canada)	3× Platinum	300,000^{^}
Denmark (IFPI Danmark)	Gold	25,000^{^}
France (SNEP)	Diamond	1,000,000^{*}
Germany (BVMI)	Gold	250,000^{^}
Greece (IFPI Greece)	Gold	15,000^{^}
Ireland (IRMA)	6× Platinum	30,000
Italy (FIMI) sales in 2000	2× Platinum	250,000
Italy (FIMI) sales since 2009	Gold	25,000^{‡}
Netherlands (NVPI)	2× Platinum	200,000^{^}
New Zealand (RMNZ)	7× Platinum	105,000^{^}
Norway (IFPI Norway)	Platinum	50,000^{*}
Sweden (GLF)	Platinum	80,000^{^}
Switzerland (IFPI Switzerland)	3× Gold	75,000^{^}
United Kingdom (BPI)	6× Platinum	1,850,388
United States (RIAA)	2× Platinum	2,700,000
Summaries
Europe (IFPI)	4× Platinum	4,000,000^{*}
Worldwide	—	12,000,000
^{*} Sales figures based on certification alone.^{^} Shipments figures based on certification alone.^{‡} Sales+streaming figures based on certification alone.
