= Bessie Jones (American singer) =

American gospel and folk singer

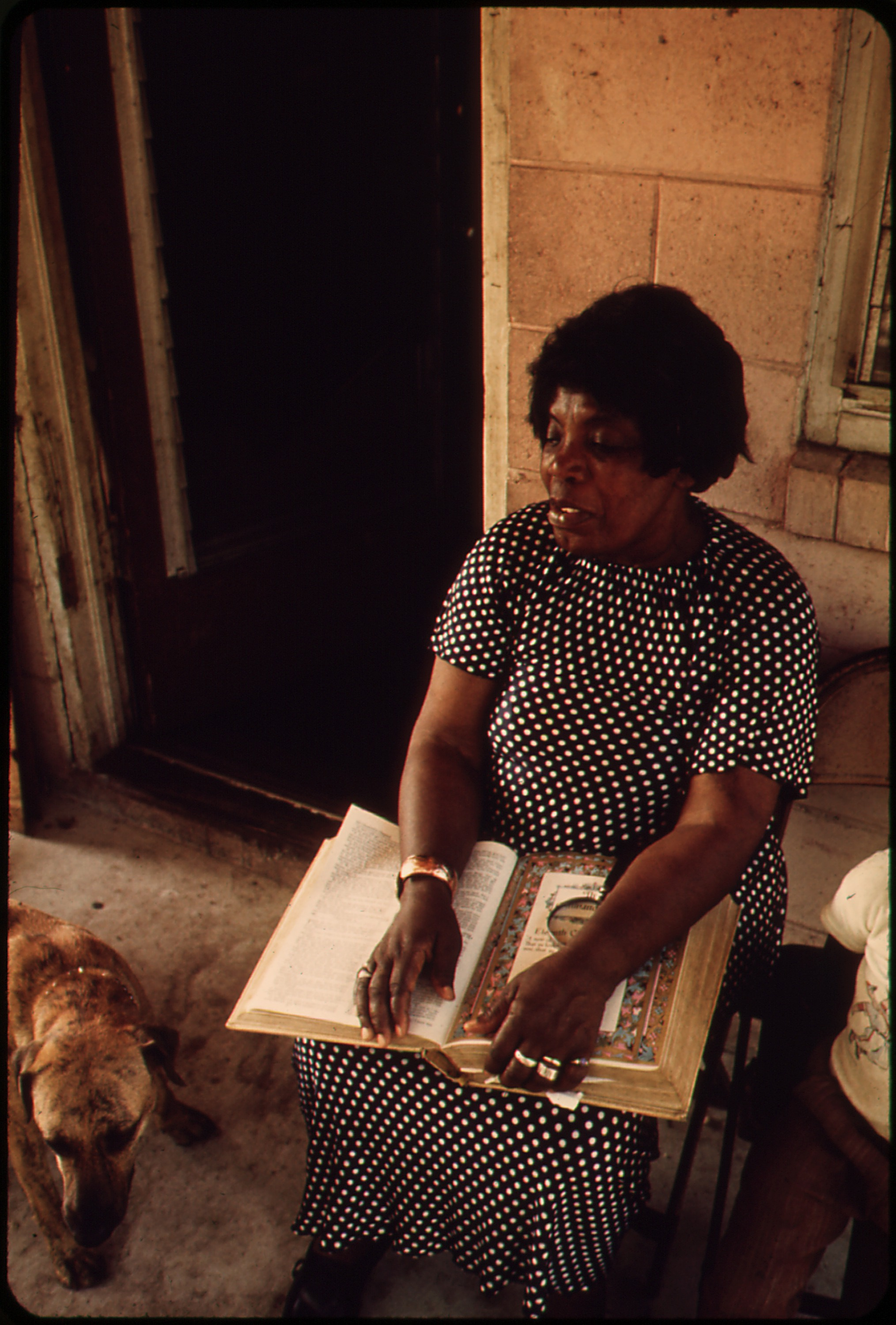
- Jones in 1973

Background information
- Born: Mary Elizabeth Jones; February 8, 1902; Smithville, Georgia, U.S.
- Died: July 17, 1984 (aged 82) Brunswick, Georgia, U.S.
- Genres: Gospel, folk

Mary Elizabeth Jones (February 8, 1902 – July 17, 1984) was an American gospel and folk singer credited with helping to bring folk songs, games and stories to wider audiences in the 20th century. Alan Lomax, who first encountered Jones on a field recording trip in 1959, said, "She was on fire to teach America. In my heart, I call her the Mother Courage of American Black traditions."

== Life ==
Jones grew up in an impoverished but musical family in the small black farming community of Dawson, Georgia. Her grandfather, a former slave born in Africa, taught her many songs he would sing in the fields. Jones only attended school until age 10, and she had her first child and marriage at just 12 years old. Her first husband, Cassius, died a few years later. In 1924, Jones left her 10-year-old daughter with relatives and traveled to Florida, where she worked odd jobs, played cards and sold moonshine. She eventually settled down with her second husband on St. Simons Island, where she joined the Georgia Sea Island Singers.

Jones felt a need to preserve African-American history through song and dance, and in 1961 she traveled to New York City so Lomax could record her biography and body of music. The recordings are preserved in the Alan Lomax archive. She and the Georgia Sea Island Singers toured extensively in the 1960s, singing in Carnegie Hall, Central Park, the Smithsonian Institution's folklife festivals, the Newport Folk Festival and the Monterey Folk Festival May 18-19, 1963. She was awarded many of folk music's premiere honors, including a 1982 National Endowment for the Arts National Heritage Fellowship and the Duke Ellington Fellowship at Yale University.

Jones told an interviewer in Alachua, Florida in the early 1980s, that she was born in Lacrosse, Florida (Alachua County), when that area was a tung oil production area, but this claim is dismissed by researchers Bob Eagle and Eric LeBlanc. Jones also said she had not been to a doctor since 1925 and that she wore many copper bracelets which protected her from disease. She died from leukemia in 1984.

Jones' 1960 song "Sometimes" was sampled in American electronica musician Moby's 1998 single "Honey", and a cover version by Larkin Poe is the opening track on their 2018 album Venom & Faith. Her 1977 song "Beggin' the Blues" was sampled by Norman Cook for Beats International's 1990 single "Burundi Blues".

== Partial discography ==
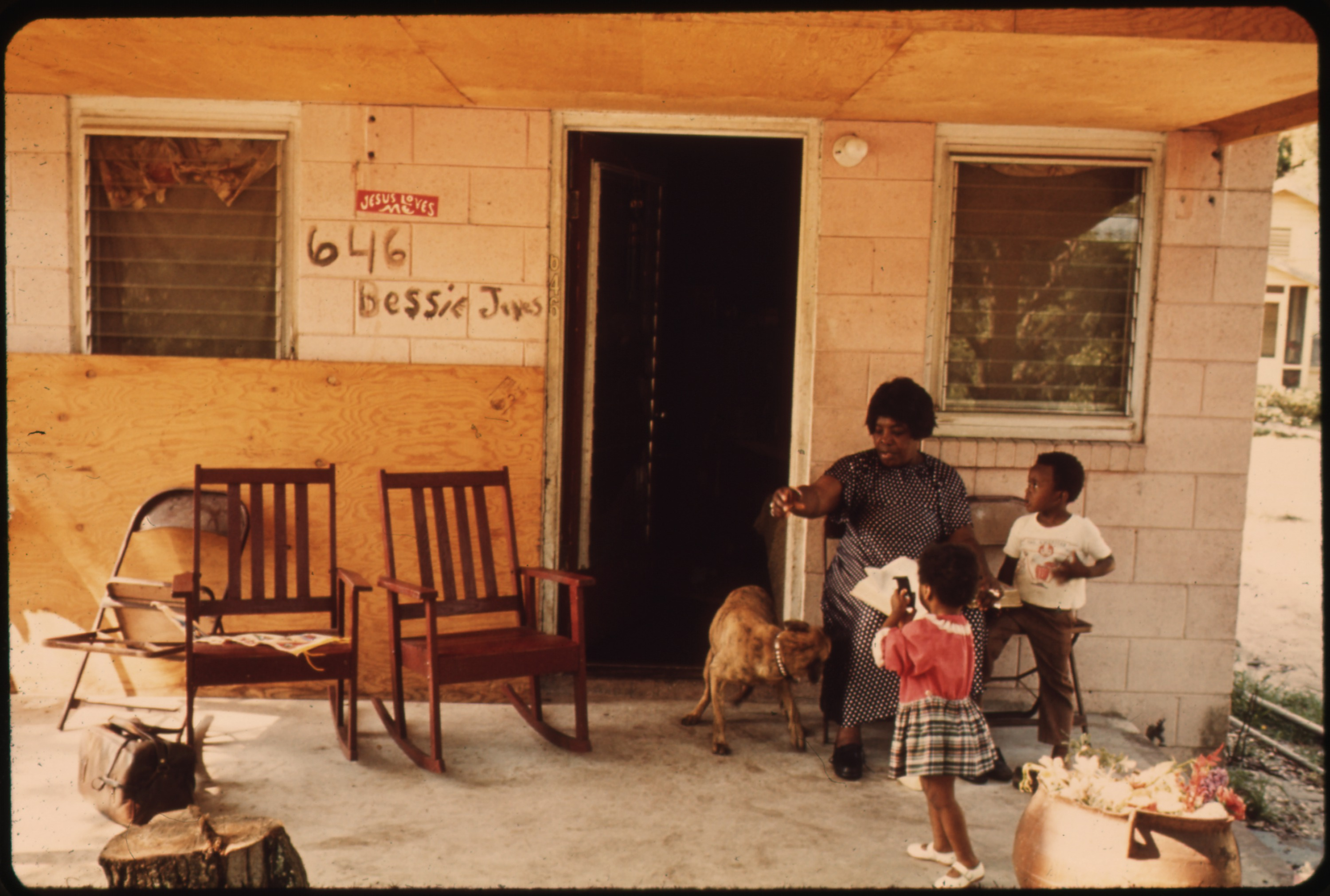
At home on St. Simons Island, 1973: Bessie Jones and two great-grandchildren

- Get in Union (Tompkins Square) 2015
- Join the Band: The Georgia Sea Island Singers (Global Jukebox) 2012
- Southern Journey Recordings, V. 12, Georgia Sea Islands: Songs and Spirituals (Rounder 1712)
- Southern Journey Recordings, V. 13, Earliest Times: Georgia Sea Island: Songs for Everyday Living (Rounder 1713).
- Put Your Hand On Your Hip, and Let Your Backbone Slip: Songs and Games from the Georgia Sea Islands (Rounder 11587) 2001
- Step It Down (Rounder) 1979
- So Glad I'm Here (Rounder 2015) 1974
