= Live Ambients – Improvised Recordings Vol. 1 =

Live Ambient – Improvised Recordings Vol. 1

Studio album by Moby
- Released: December 24, 2020
- Recorded: 2020
- Studio: Moby's home studio in Los Angeles, California
- Genre: Ambient
- Length: 112:00
- Label: Mobyambient
- Producer: Moby

Moby chronology
All Visible Objects (2020)	Live Ambient – Improvised Recordings Vol. 1 (2020)	Reprise (2021)

Live Ambient – Improvised Recordings Vol. 1 is the eighteenth studio album by American musician Moby, released on December 24, 2020 on his ambient music imprint, Mobyambient. It features 10 tracks recorded at his home studio that were fully improvised, with nothing written beforehand.

== Background ==
Moby announced the album on December 22, 2020 and shared the three conditions that he set himself when recording started: to capture a purely improvised performance with nothing written beforehand, avoid any editing of the tracks once recording had finished, and that every part of the recording process was to be "calming".

== Release ==
The album was released on December 24, 2020 on various digital streaming platforms. This will be followed by videos of Moby performing each track being released on his YouTube channel on December 30. On December 22, the day the album was announced, Moby released the audio and video of the first track, "Live Ambient 1".

== Track listing ==
1. "Live Ambient 1" - 10:51
2. "Live Ambient 2" - 10:11
3. "Live Ambient 3" - 10:08
4. "Live Ambient 4" - 11:33
5. "Live Ambient 5" - 9:17
6. "Live Ambient 6" - 8:56
7. "Live Ambient 7" - 9:43
8. "Live Ambient 8" - 6:55
9. "Live Ambient 9" - 8:03
10. "Live Ambient 10" - 27:12
