= Honey (Moby song) =

Single by Moby

from the album Play
- B-side: "Micronesia"; "Memory Gospel"
- Released: August 24, 1998
- Studio: Moby's home studio (Manhattan, New York)
- Genre: Techno; breakbeat; blues
- Length: 3:27 (album version); 3:18 (single version)
- Label: Mute; V2
- Songwriters: Moby; Bessie Jones; Alan Lomax
- Producer: Moby

Moby singles chronology
"James Bond Theme (Moby's Re-Version)" (1997)	"Honey" (1998)	"Run On" (1998)

Music video
- "Honey" on YouTube

"Honey" is a song by American electronic musician Moby. It was released as the lead single from his fifth studio album Play on August 24, 1998. The song samples the 1960 recording "Sometimes" by American blues singer Bessie Jones. Moby first heard "Sometimes" on a box set collection of folk music compiled by Alan Lomax, and subsequently composed "Honey" around vocal samples from the Jones song.

"Honey" was well received by music critics, many of whom cited it as a highlight of Play in reviews of the album. Upon release as a single, "Honey" charted in several countries in Europe, despite receiving little airplay on European radio. The song's music video, directed by Roman Coppola, depicts three clones of Moby venturing through various locations. "Honey" was later remixed with additional vocals from American R&B singer Kelis.

== Background and composition ==
Moby composed "Honey" for his fifth studio album Play (1999) after listening to Sounds of the South, a 1993 box set of folk music recordings compiled by field collector Alan Lomax. Inspired by the a cappella songs in particular, Moby wrote "Honey" in "about 10 minutes." Tracks from the box set would also be used as the basis for the Play songs "Find My Baby" and "Natural Blues". After producing "Honey", Moby commissioned Mario Caldato Jr. to mix the song. Moby was surprised by Caldato's willingness to offer his assistance, given that Caldato had just worked on the album Hello Nasty by hip hop group Beastie Boys, which "was doing incredibly well", while in contrast Moby's recent music had been met with critical and commercial indifference.

"Honey" is built around a repeated sample of four lines from the 1960 song "Sometimes" by American blues singer Bessie Jones, which was included on Sounds of the South; Jones and Lomax receive co-writing credits on "Honey". In each line, Jones sings a variation on the refrain "...my honey come back", and a choir responds "sometime". Moby has said that the sampled lyrics convey "female sex". The vocal samples on "Honey" are juxtaposed with what AllMusic critic John Bush describes as a "breakbeat techno" musical backing. The song features a piano-driven beat and additional instrumentation performed by Moby himself, including original slide guitar parts. Other elements incorporated into the music include hand claps sampled from "Sometimes", record scratches, and synthesized strings.

== Release ==
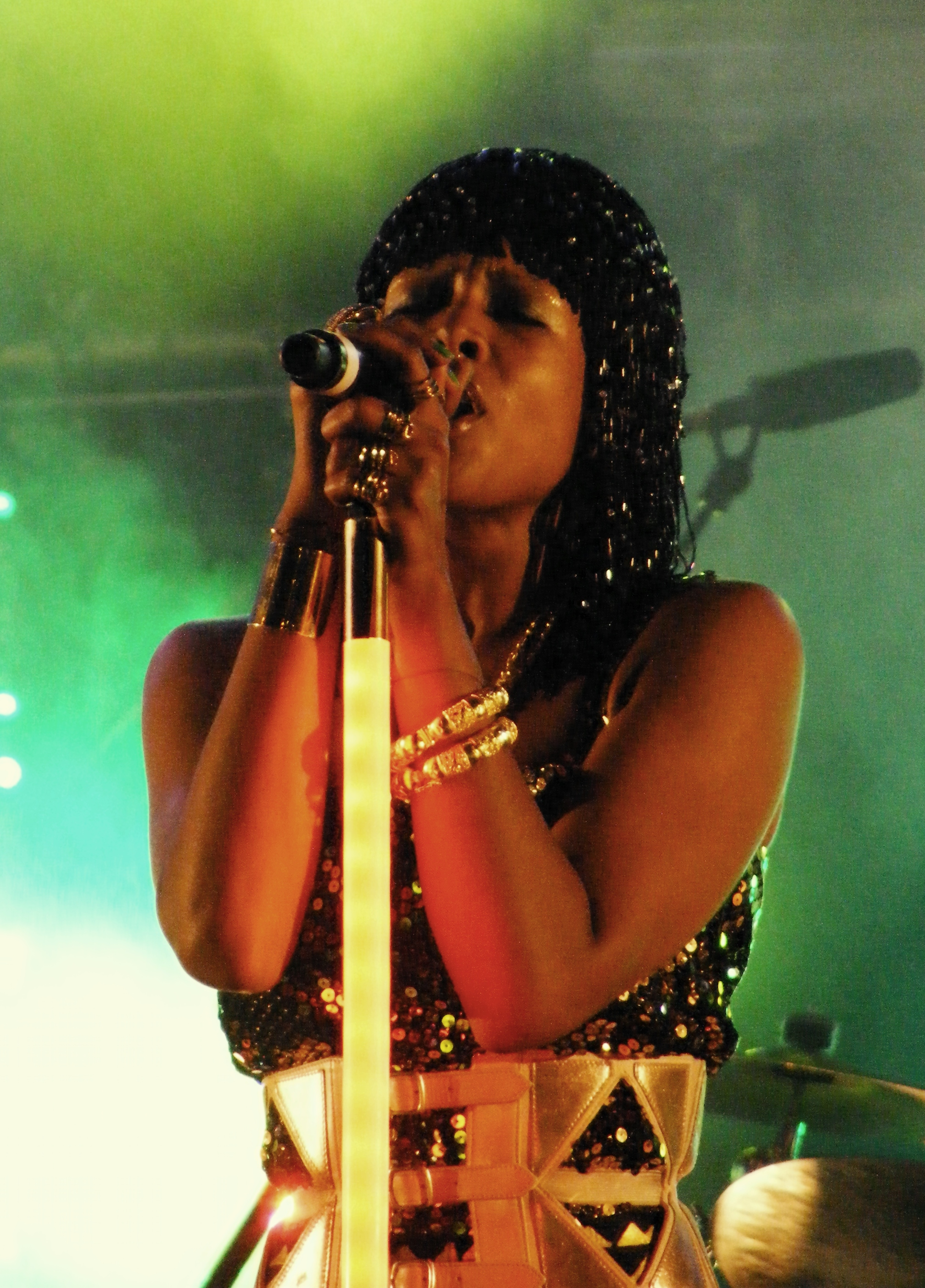
Kelis performed vocals on a remix of "Honey".

"Honey" was released as the lead single from Play on August 24, 1998, in Europe, nine months prior to the release of the album. Numerous remixes of the song were produced for its single release by different artists, including Aphrodite, WestBam, Faithless members Rollo Armstrong and Sister Bliss, and Moby himself. Instead of choosing specific ones to include on the single, Moby and his label Mute Records opted to commercially release all of the remixes that had been produced. Moby recalled that European radio stations were hesitant to play "Honey" because "they said it was an instrumental dance track", a categorization that he disputed: "I listen to it and all I hear is singing. Are they talking about the same song?"

Despite minimal radio airplay, "Honey" managed to chart in several European countries. It debuted and peaked at number 33 on the UK Singles Chart. The single also managed chart placings in Austria (at number 30), Germany (at number 77), and the Netherlands (at number 94). Outside Europe, "Honey" charted at number 95 in Australia, while in the United States, where it was issued by V2 Records as a double A-side release with "Run On", it reached number 49 on Billboard magazine's Dance/Electronic Singles Sales chart.

Moby later collaborated with American R&B singer Kelis on a remix of "Honey", on which she provided additional vocals. Additional production and remixing were done for the new version by Fafu. The remix was released as a double A-side single with "Why Does My Heart Feel So Bad?" on October 16, 2000, and peaked at number 17 on the UK Singles Chart. It was also issued by Festival Mushroom Records as a double A-side single with "Porcelain" in Australia and New Zealand, charting at number 56 in the former.

== Critical reception ==
In his 2002 book I Hear America Singing: An Introduction to Popular Music, David Kastin noted that "Honey" was often singled out in reviews of Play for special praise. Jim Sullivan of The Boston Globe cited "Honey" as a highlight of Play, while Gene Stout of the Seattle Post-Intelligencer deemed it "one of the album's most riveting tracks." Reviews in NME described the song as "a sparkling diamond" and a "natural born dancefloor groove". The Guardian's Dominic Wills praised "Honey" as "joyous, hypnotic, romping blues". Writing for The Village Voice, Frank Owen called it "a mesmerizing floor-filler, arousing memories of Hamilton Bohannon's hypnotic '70s metronome funk." MTV reviewer Alexandra Marshall applauded Moby for avoiding "cloying pity" in his sampling of older recordings, and "not trying cutely to juxtapose a 'naïve' form with a sophisticated one". At the end of 1999, "Honey" was named the year's tenth-best single by Spin, and it was voted by critics as the year's 24th-best single in The Village Voice's Pazz & Jop poll.

== Music video ==
The music video for "Honey" was directed by Roman Coppola. It opens with a wooden box falling to the ground. Three clones of Moby, all wearing suits, emerge from the box and make their way to a city. One clone spots a luxury car and walks toward it, but accidentally drops a map in his possession. Crawling underneath the car to retrieve the map, he finds himself in a woman's apartment room. He manages to obtain the map and exit the room before the woman discovers his presence. He enters another room, followed by his fellow clones, and jumps out the window.

Two of the clones are then seen in a forest. One walks behind a tree and reappears dressed in casual attire, then climbs up another tree and ends up in the bathroom of the woman's apartment, where he clandestinely retrieves a package. He crawls beneath her bed and finds himself underneath a car. He crawls out and retrieves a gasoline can from the package, which he pours into the fuel filler of the car (which is located behind its license plate). All three clones enter the car and drive to the box. They step back into the box, which then explodes.

== Track listing ==
=== Original version ===
- CD single (CDMute218)
1. "Honey" – 3:18
2. "Micronesia" – 4:18
3. "Memory Gospel" – 6:42
- 12-inch single (12MUTE218)
1. "Honey" (Rollo & Sister Bliss remix) – 7:06
2. "Honey" (Sharam Jey's Sweet Honey mix) – 5:48
3. "Honey" (Low Side mix) – 5:52
- CD single – remixes (LCDMute218)
1. "Honey" (Rollo & Sister Bliss Blunt edit) – 4:02
2. "Honey" (Moby's 118 mix; radio edit) – 3:16
3. "Honey" (WestBam & Hardy Hard mix) – 6:19
4. "Honey" (Aphrodite & Mickey Finn remix) – 6:21
- 12-inch single – remixes (L12MUTE218)
1. "Honey" (Risk mix) – 5:59
2. "Honey" (Dark mix) – 4:43
3. "Honey" (WestBam & Hardy Hard mix) – 6:19
4. "Honey" (118 mix) – 3:16
5. "Honey" (Aphrodite & Mickey Finn mix) – 6:21
6. "Honey" (RJ's mix) – 6:12
7. "Honey" (original mix) – 3:14
8. "Honey" (Bammer's mix) – 6:20
- "Honey" / "Run On" CD single (63881-27583-2)
1. "Honey" (album mix) – 3:27
2. "Honey" (Moby's 118 mix) – 4:48
3. "Honey" (Sharam Jey's Sweet Honey mix) – 6:41
4. "Honey" (Aphrodite & Mickey Finn mix) – 6:21
5. "Run On" (extended) – 4:25
6. "Run On" (Moby's Young & Funky mix) – 6:03
7. "Run On" (Sharam Jey's Always on the Run remix) – 5:59
8. "Memory Gospel" – 6:42
- "Honey" / "Run On" 12-inch single (63881-27582-1)
1. "Run On" (Moby's Young & Funky mix) – 6:03
2. "Run On" (Dani König remix) – 10:04
3. "Honey" (album mix) – 3:27
4. "Run On" (Sharam Jey's Always on the Run remix) – 5:59

=== Remix ===
- "Why Does My Heart Feel So Bad?" / "Honey" CD single (CDMute255)
1. "Why Does My Heart Feel So Bad?" – 3:45
2. "Honey" (remix edit; featuring Kelis) – 3:13
3. "Flower" – 3:25
- "Why Does My Heart Feel So Bad?" / "Honey" CD single – remixes (LCDMute255)
1. "Honey" (Fafu's 12" mix; featuring Kelis) – 6:19
2. "Why Does My Heart Feel So Bad?" (Red Jerry's String & Breaks mix) – 5:59
3. "The Sun Never Stops Setting" – 4:19
- "Honey" / "Porcelain" CD single (MUSH019852)
1. "Honey" (remix edit; featuring Kelis) – 3:13
2. "Porcelain" (album mix) – 4:01
3. "Honey" (Fafu's 12" mix; featuring Kelis) – 6:19
4. "Porcelain" (Clubbed to Death variation by Rob Dougan) – 6:36
5. "Honey" (Moby's 118 mix) – 4:48

== Charts ==
=== Original version ===
Weekly chart performance for "Honey"
Chart (1998–1999)	Peak position
Australia (ARIA)	95
Austria (Ö3 Austria Top 40)	30
Germany (GfK)	77
Netherlands (Single Top 100)	94
Scottish Singles Sales (Official Charts)	29
UK Singles (Official Charts)	33
UK Dance (Official Charts)	17
UK Independent (Official Charts)	5
US Dance Singles Sales (Billboard) with "Run On"	49

=== Remix ===
==== With "Porcelain" ====
Weekly chart performance for "Honey" / "Porcelain"
Chart (2000–2001)	Peak position
Australia (ARIA)	56
Australia Alternative (ARIA)	4
Australia Dance (ARIA)	25

==== With "Why Does My Heart Feel So Bad?" ====
Weekly chart performance for "Honey" / "Why Does My Heart Feel So Bad?"
Chart (2000)	Peak position
Scottish Singles Sales (Official Charts)	17
UK Singles (Official Charts)	17
UK Independent (Official Charts)	7

== Certifications ==
Certifications for "Honey"
Region	Certification	Certified units/sales
New Zealand (RMNZ)	Gold	15,000^{‡}
^{‡} Sales+streaming figures based on certification alone.

== Bibliography ==
- d'Escriván, Julio (2012). Music Technology. Cambridge University Press. ISBN 978-0-5211-7042-0.
- Kastin, David (2002). I Hear America Singing: An Introduction to Popular Music. Prentice Hall. ISBN 978-0-1335-3376-7.
