= Vera Hall =

American folk and blues singer (1902–1964)

Background information
- Born: Adell Hall Ward; April 6, 1902; Paynesville, Sumter County, Alabama, U.S.
- Died: January 29, 1964 (aged 61) Tuscaloosa, Alabama, U.S.
- Genres: Folk, Piedmont blues, country blues

Adele Hall Ward, better known as Vera Hall (April 6, 1902 – January 29, 1964), was an American folk singer from the Livingston, Alabama region. Best known for her 1937 song "Trouble So Hard", she was inducted into the Alabama Women's Hall of Fame in 2005.

== Biography ==
Hall was born at Payneville, Sumter County, Alabama, near Livingston, and sang her entire life. Her mother Agnes Hall, a former slave, and father Efron “Zully” Hall, taught her songs such as "I've Got a Home in the Rock" and "When I'm Standing Wondering, Lord, Show Me the Way".

Hall married Nels Riddle, a coal miner, in 1918 and later gave birth to their daughter Minnie Ada in 1920. Nels Riddle was shot and killed in 1923 or 1924. Minnie Ada died in 1940 of chronic hepatitis, so Hall raised Ada's two sons.

John Avery Lomax, ethnomusicologist, met Hall in the 1930s and recorded her for the Library of Congress. Lomax wrote that she had the loveliest voice he had ever recorded. The BBC played Hall's recording of "Another Man Done Gone" in 1943 as a sample of American folk music. Earlier, The Library of Congress played the song in commemoration of the 75th Anniversary of the Emancipation Proclamation in 1937. In 1945, Hall recorded with Byron Arnold. In 1984, the recordings were released as a collection of folk songs entitled Cornbread Crumbled in Gravy. According to recording artist and writer Stephen Wade, "'Another Man Done Gone' became Vera Hall's most celebrated performance. Carl Sandburg recalled listening to it more than a dozen consecutive times during a January 1944 visit to Lomax's Dallas home...."

In 1948, with the help of Alan Lomax, Hall traveled to New York and performed on May 15 at the American Music Festival at Columbia University. During the course of this trip, Lomax interviewed Hall on several occasions, later stating "Her singing is like a deep-voiced shepherds flute, mellow and pure in tone, yet always with hints of the lips and the pleasure-loving flesh...The sound comes from deep within her when she sings, from a source of gold and light, otherwise hidden, and falls directly upon your ear like sunlight. It is a liquid, full contralto, rich in low overtones; but it can leap directly into falsetto and play there as effortlessly as a bird in the wind."

Hall died in January 1964 in Tuscaloosa, Alabama.

Today, her work still garners attention. Prized by scholars and folk song enthusiasts, Hall's recordings include examples of early blues and folk songs that are found nowhere else.

== Legacy ==
Lomax's son, Alan, also championed Vera Hall, bringing her to New York for a performance at Columbia University in 1948 and assembling Rainbow Sign, a book based on Hall's life and stories.

Moby's 2000 single "Natural Blues" is essentially an extended remix of the song "Trouble So Hard" recorded by Hall in 1937.

A historical marker in Hall's honor was dedicated on April 21, 2007 in Livingston.
