= God's Gonna Cut You Down =

American folk song

"God's Gonna Cut You Down" (also known as "God Almighty's Gonna Cut You Down", "God's Gonna Cut 'Em Down", "Run On" and "Sermon") is a traditional American folk song. The track has been recorded in a variety of genres, including country, folk, alternative rock, electronic and black metal. The lyrics warn evildoers that they cannot avoid God's judgment.

As "Run On for a Long Time", it was released in 1949 by Bill Landford & The Landfordaires. As "God's Gonna Cut You Down", it was recorded in 1946 by The Golden Gate Quartet and was performed by Odetta on Odetta Sings Ballads and Blues (1956), and Johnny Cash on the posthumously released American V: A Hundred Highways (2006). Marilyn Manson also used this title for a non-album single in 2019. As "Run On", it has been recorded by Elvis Presley and Tom Jones, and the Blind Boys of Alabama. The song has been covered by many other artists.

== Moby version ==
"Run On"

Single by Moby

from the album Play
- Released: April 26, 1999
- Studio: Moby's home studio (Manhattan, New York)
- Length: 3:45 (album version); 3:33 (single version)
- Label: V2; Mute
- Songwriter: Moby
- Producer: Moby

Moby singles chronology
"Honey" (1999)	"Run On" (1999)	"Bodyrock" (1999)

"Run On" is a remix of the version by Bill Landford and the Landfordairs, by American electronica musician Moby. It was released as the second single from his fifth studio album Play on April 26, 1999.

Recorded by Moby for his fifth studio album Play, "Run On" features samples from "Run On for a Long Time", a 1949 recording by Bill Landford and the Landfordairs of the traditional folk hymn "God's Gonna Cut You Down", which make up the song's vocal content. Moby was unaware of the original hymn's considerable popularity in country and gospel music as a standard while recording the song. He later recalled that "Run On" was "really hard to put together, because it has so many samples in it. I didn't use computers at this point, it was all done with stand-alone samplers. When it was finished, I collapsed in exhaustion."

=== Music video ===
The music video for "Run On" was directed by Mike Mills. Mills' video depicts Moby working at an office whose employees all wear white. A flashback is then shown involving a workout instructor who faints while teaching a class; Moby then arrives and puts an inhaler in her mouth, reviving her. The video proceeds through subsequent flashbacks to explain the entire plot: the office Moby works in is heaven, the instructor is self-conscious and unsure of her capabilities, and heaven is a self-help phone line. Towards the end of the video, Moby is seen dead in a parking lot, with a man checking his pulse. The video concludes similarly to the opening scene, with Moby working in an office while still living, only everyone is unkind and emotionally distant.

=== Track listing ===
- CD single (CDMUTE221)
1. "Run On" – 3:33
2. "Spirit" – 4:12
3. "Running" – 7:07
- CD single – extended (LCDMUTE221)
1. "Run On" (extended) – 4:24
2. "Sunday" – 5:00
3. "Down Slow" (full length version) – 5:56
- 12-inch single (12MUTE221)
1. "Run On" (Moby Young & Funky Mix) – 6:08
2. "Run On" (Dave Clarke Mix) – 5:08
3. "Run On" (extended) – 3:55
- CD single (63881-27583-2)
1. "Honey" – 3:27
2. "Honey" (Moby's 118 Mix) – 4:49
3. "Honey" (Sharam Jey's Sweet Honey Mix) – 6:41
4. "Honey" (Aphrodite & Mickey Finn Mix) – 6:24
5. "Run On" (extended) – 4:27
6. "Run On" (Moby's Young and Funky Mix) – 6:05
7. "Run On" (Sharam Jey's Always on the Run Remix) – 6:01
8. "Memory Gospel" – 6:42

=== Charts ===
Chart (1999)	Peak position
Australia (ARIA)	93
Scottish Singles Sales (Official Charts)	35
UK Singles (Official Charts)	33
UK Dance (Official Charts)	27
UK Independent (Official Charts)	7
US Dance/Electronic Singles Sales (Billboard)	49

== Johnny Cash version ==
"God's Gonna Cut You Down"

Single by Johnny Cash

from the album American V: A Hundred Highways
- Released: July 4, 2006
- Recorded: 2003
- Genre: Folk blues; country; folk; gospel
- Length: 2:38
- Label: American Recordings; Lost Highway Records
- Songwriter: Traditional
- Producer: Rick Rubin

Johnny Cash singles chronology
"Hurt" (2003)	"God's Gonna Cut You Down" (2006)	"Help Me" (2007)

Music video
- "Johnny Cash - God's Gonna Cut You Down (Official Music Video)" on YouTube

Johnny Cash recorded a version of "God's Gonna Cut You Down" on American V: A Hundred Highways in 2003, with an arrangement quite different from most known gospel versions of the song. As of January 2016, this version of the song sold 672,000 copies in the United States.

A music video, directed by Tony Kaye, was made for this version in late 2006, three years after Cash's death. The video was shot entirely in black and white and features a number of celebrities: David Allan Coe, Patricia Arquette, Travis Barker, Peter Blake, Bono, Sheryl Crow, Johnny Depp, the Dixie Chicks (now known as The Chicks), Flea, Billy Gibbons, Whoopi Goldberg, Woody Harrelson, Dennis Hopper, Terrence Howard, Jay-Z, Mick Jones, Kid Rock, Anthony Kiedis, Kris Kristofferson, Amy Lee, Tommy Lee, Adam Levine, Shelby Lynne, Chris Martin, Kate Moss, Graham Nash, Iggy Pop, Lisa Marie Presley, Q-Tip, Corinne Bailey Rae, Keith Richards, Chris Rock, Rick Rubin, Patti Smith, Sharon Stone, Justin Timberlake, Kanye West, Brian Wilson, and Owen Wilson.

This version has appeared in the Fox series Gotham, during the episode titled "What the Little Bird Told Him". It also featured in the season three episode of NBC series The Blacklist, "The Director: Conclusion", and in the CBC series Republic of Doyle, where it closed episode 10 of season 2, "The Special Detective". It is also the close-out song for the Australian road trip mini-series Wanted.

=== Charts ===
Chart (2008)	Peak position
UK Singles (Official Charts)	77

=== Certifications ===
Region	Certification	Certified units/sales
United Kingdom (BPI)	Silver	200,000^{‡}
^{‡} Sales+streaming figures based on certification alone.

== Marilyn Manson version ==
"God's Gonna Cut You Down"

Single by Marilyn Manson
- Released: October 18, 2019
- Genre: Gothic country
- Length: 2:40
- Label: Loma Vista
- Songwriter: Traditional
- Producer: Tyler Bates

Marilyn Manson singles chronology
"Cry Little Sister" (2018)	"God's Gonna Cut You Down" (2019)	"The End" (2019)

Music video
- "God's Gonna Cut You Down" on YouTube

Marilyn Manson recorded a cover version of the track during sessions for their tenth studio album, Heaven Upside Down, which was released in 2017. They performed the song live several times during that album's supporting concert tour. Their studio version of the track first appeared on the Ethan Hawke film 24 Hours to Live, the soundtrack of which was issued via Varèse Sarabande on December 8, 2017. The song was then released as a standalone digital download and streaming single on October 18, 2019, in tandem with a tour by the band. A vinyl picture disc was released on December 13, 2019, and limited to 3,000 copies worldwide. The vinyl single features one of Manson's watercolor paintings as its artwork.

A music video directed by Tim Mattia, who previously directed the video for the Born Villain track "Hey, Cruel World...", was filmed in Joshua Tree, California and was also released on October 18. The track peaked at number eight on Hot Rock Songs and at number one on Rock Digital Songs—the band's highest peak on either chart.

=== Charts ===
Chart (2019)	Peak position
Canada Hot Digital Songs (Billboard)	44
France (SNEP Sales Chart)	154
Hungary (Single Top 40)	26
Italy Independent Singles (FIMI)	40
New Zealand Hot Singles (RMNZ)	29
US Hot Rock & Alternative Songs (Billboard)	8
US Rock Digital Songs (Billboard)	1

== Other famous recordings ==
- American singer and civil rights activist Odetta recorded the song as "God's Gonna Cut You Down" in the style of a 19th-century revival meeting preaching hymn, for her 1957 album Odetta Sings Ballads and Blues.
- Bobbie Gentry issued a version of the song, under the title "Sermon", on her 1968 album The Delta Sweete.
- Tom Jones recorded "Run On" for his 2010 album Praise & Blame.
- Mercury Rev re-recorded Gentry's The Delta Sweete album in 2019; their version of "Sermon" featured vocals by Margo Price.
- Bailey Zimmerman recorded a rendition of the song for his debut album Religiously. The Album. in 2023.
- A version by Black Rebel Motorcycle Club was used in episode 2 of the 2024 Netflix miniseries A Man In Full. On 11 July 2025, the band issued a "cease and desist" request via a post on their Instagram page to the Donald Trump administration's Department of Homeland Security for the unauthorized use of their recording of the song in a recruitment video.
