= South Side (song) =

2000 single by Moby

- US CD two-track edition

Single by Moby featuring Gwen Stefani

from the album Play
- B-side: "Ain't Never Learned"; "The Sun Never Stops Setting"
- Released: October 10, 2000
- Studio: Moby's home studio (Manhattan, New York)
- Genre: Dance-rock
- Length: 3:48 (album version); 3:49 (single version); 3:25 (radio edit)
- Label: V2
- Songwriter: Moby
- Producer: Moby

Moby singles chronology
"Porcelain" (2000)	"South Side" (2000)	"Find My Baby" (2000)

Gwen Stefani singles chronology
"South Side" (2000)	"Let Me Blow Ya Mind" (2001)

Music video
- "South Side" on YouTube

"South Side" is a song written and recorded by American electronica musician Moby. It was released to radio on October 10, 2000, as the seventh single from his fifth studio album, Play (1999). Initially recorded with No Doubt frontwoman Gwen Stefani, production problems forced Moby to leave Stefani's vocals off the mix of the song included on Play; Stefani's vocals were then restored for the song's single release. The drums are sampled from "What's Up Front That Counts" by the Counts.

Although "South Side" was not released as a single in Europe or Australia, it is one of Moby's most commercially successful singles in North America, becoming his first song to appear on the US Billboard Hot 100, where it peaked at number 14. In Canada, the song reached number three on the Canadian Singles Chart.

== Background ==
In April 2005, Moby stated that "South Side" was inspired by his visits to Chicago and his love for its house music scene, but that its lyrics are intended to be unsettling and imply a connection between getting used to loud music as part of clubbing, and desensitization to violence. Speaking to Rolling Stone on the tenth anniversary of its release, he described it as "essentially a song about abject amorality", as well as a "happy sing-along pop song about kids that become so inured to violence and become so desensitized that nothing gets through to them. It's about people who have become so over-exposed to stimuli that nothing matters to them anymore."

During the recording sessions for Moby's fifth studio album Play, Gwen Stefani, lead singer of the rock band No Doubt, offered to perform guest vocals for "South Side". Around the time of the song's recording, No Doubt had recently achieved substantial commercial success with their 1995 album Tragic Kingdom, and Moby reflected that he "couldn't figure out why she'd want to go into the studio with me. She was a big rock star and I was a has-been." Moby was impressed by her vocal performance, but he struggled to produce an adequate mix of the song with her vocals, and ultimately left them off the version included on Play.

== Release ==
"South Side" originally appeared as the fifth track on Play. Moby had managed to tap a friend of his to produce a new mix of "South Side". For the song's release as a single, Stefani's vocals were restored to the song, as originally intended. It was first sent to modern rock and adult contemporary radio in October 2000 and was aired by top 40 stations the following month.

== Chart performance ==
The song was not released as a single in Europe or Australia, but it was a chart hit in North America. In the United States, the song debuted at number 94 on the Billboard Hot 100 chart dated December 2, 2000. The song broke the top 40 on January 6, 2001, climbing to number 37. On the week of May 26, the song reached its peak position of number 14, then exited the chart from number 46 seven weeks later, on the chart dated July 14. Altogether, it stayed on the Hot 100 for 32 weeks and appeared at number 33 on Billboard's year-end chart for 2001. It was Moby's only appearance on the Hot 100 until 2018, when he appeared as a featured artist on ASAP Rocky's song "ASAP Forever". "South Side" also made appearances on several other Billboard charts, including the Modern Rock Tracks chart—where it reached number three—and the Adult Top 40 chart—where it peaked at number eight.

In Canada, "South Side" was more successful, becoming Moby's second single to chart on the country's prominent national chart, after "Porcelain" on the recently ceased RPM singles chart. It debuted and peaked at number three on the Canadian Singles Chart on December 9, 2000, then moved down to number four the following week. It remained in the top 10 for a further 11 weeks, exiting the top 20 on March 31. It re-entered the chart on the weeks dated April 7–April 14 and April 28, and it spent 19 weeks on Canada's chart in total.

== Music video ==
The music video was directed by Joseph Kahn and parodies hip hop and dance music videos. Scenes include Moby in garish fur coats and sunglasses, Moby and Stefani dancing in front of large neon signs of their names, and Moby "traveling" in a convertible with women and bottles of champagne, but the vehicle is not even actually being driven outside of the studio. The video also parodies artful videos with scenes of Moby and Stefani in a bare room, wearing drab clothing and holding a potted sunflower, visually parodying the New York "brick and plant" type of set commonly overused in videos and film.

Other elements observed in the video include Moby expressing discomfort for the fake gold insert used over his teeth. Eventually, he grudgingly adjusts it and walks off the set. Stefani is shown in one scene in front of the neon sign with her name wielding three-inch fingernails. Later, she interrupts the filming (to Moby's feigned disgust) to answer and talk on her cell phone.

Instead of a band, in the background of the video, six "musicians" at translucent computer workstations are shown. The workstation users are visually boring and a poor substitute for the presence of an actual band. The workers act as if they are playing and adjusting the electronica music samples in real-time on their keyboards during the performance, with no apparent enthusiasm whatsoever for the actual music being created. At the end of the video it shows a pot of mayonnaise and burning clothes falling from a rack.

The music video won the 2001 MTV Video Music Award for Best Male Video. Coincidentally, Stefani was also a featured singer in the winner for Best Female Video, "Let Me Blow Ya Mind" by Eve.

== Track listings ==
- CD single (63881-27665-2)
1. "South Side" (edit featuring Gwen Stefani) – 3:25
2. "South Side" (original album version) – 3:48
- Maxi-CD single (63881-27674-2)
1. "South Side" (single version featuring Gwen Stefani) – 3:49
2. "South Side" (Hybrid Dishing Pump remix featuring Gwen Stefani) – 8:27
3. "South Side" (album version) – 3:48
4. "South Side" (Peter Heller Park Lane vocal) – 8:48
5. "Ain't Never Learned" – 3:47
6. "South Side" (Hybrid Dishing Pump instrumental) – 7:54
7. "The Sun Never Stops Setting" – 4:19
- 12-inch single (63881-27676-1)
1. "South Side" (Hybrid Dishing Pump remix featuring Gwen Stefani) – 8:27
2. "South Side" (single version featuring Gwen Stefani) – 3:49
3. "South Side" (Peter Heller Park Lane vocal) – 8:48

== Charts ==
=== Weekly charts ===
Chart (2000–2001)	Peak position
Canada (Nielsen SoundScan)	3
US Billboard Hot 100	14
US Adult Pop Airplay (Billboard)	8
US Alternative Airplay (Billboard)	3
US Dance Club Songs (Billboard)	16
US Dance Singles Sales (Billboard)	4
US Pop Airplay (Billboard)	15

=== Year-end charts ===
Chart (2001)	Position
Canada (Nielsen SoundScan)	35
Canada Radio (Nielsen BDS)	47
US Billboard Hot 100	33
US Adult Top 40 (Billboard)	19
US Mainstream Top 40 (Billboard)	42
US Maxi-Singles Sales (Billboard)	16
US Modern Rock Tracks (Billboard)	10

== Release history ==
Region	Date	Format(s)	Label(s)	Ref.
United States	October 10, 2000	Alternative radio	V2	
United States	October 23, 2000	Hot adult contemporary radio	V2	
