= Porcelain (song) =

2000 single by Moby

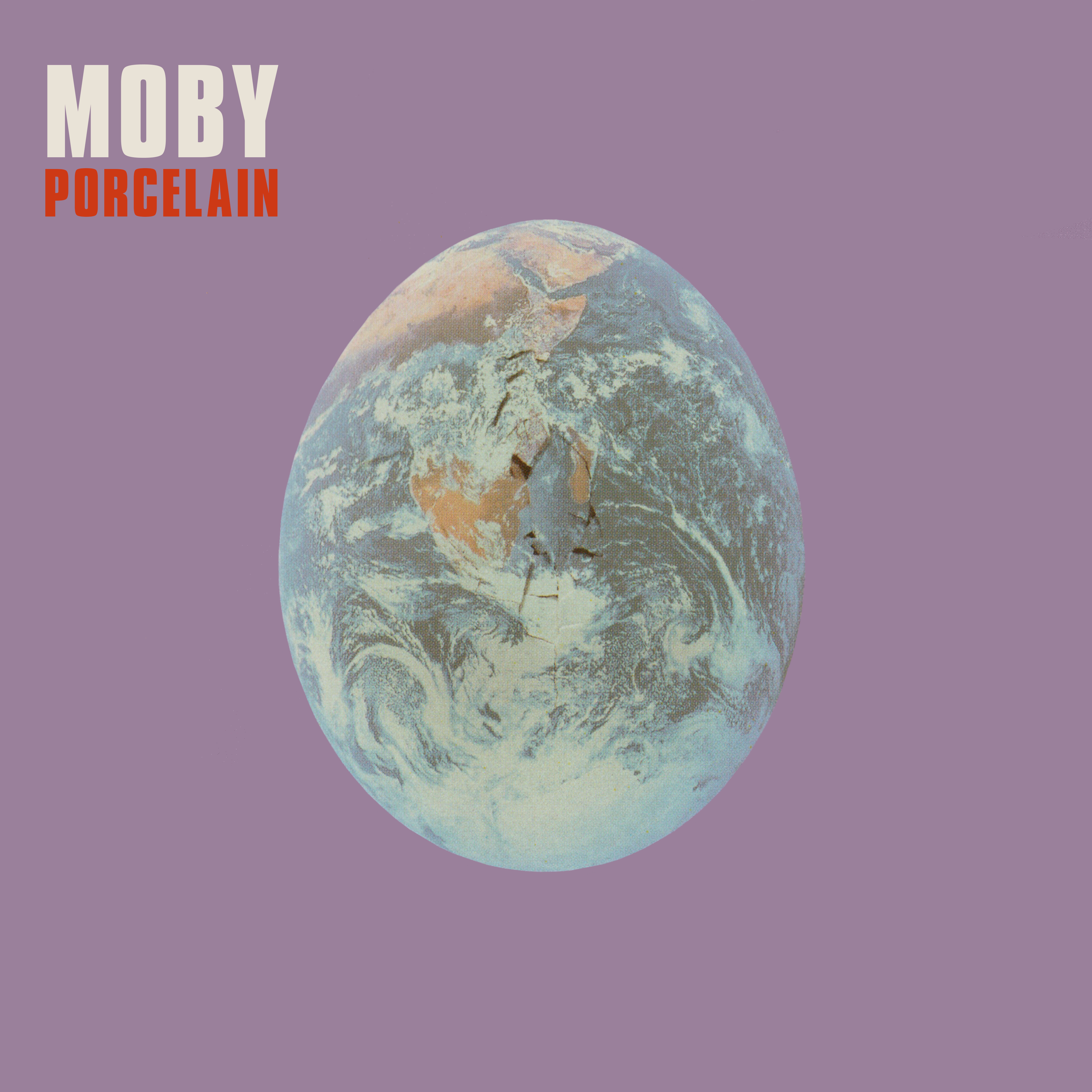
- Single cover, featuring The Blue Marble

Single by Moby

from the album Play
- B-side: "Flying Over the Dateline"; "Summer"
- Released: April 25, 2000
- Studio: Moby's home studio (Manhattan, New York)
- Genre: Downtempo; techno; dance; trip hop
- Length: 4:01 (album version); 3:32 (single version)
- Label: V2; Mute
- Songwriter: Moby
- Producer: Moby

Moby singles chronology
"Natural Blues" (2000)	"Porcelain" (2000)	"South Side" (2000)

Music video
- "Porcelain" on YouTube

"Porcelain" is a song by American electronic musician Moby. It was released on April 25, 2000, as the sixth single from his fifth studio album Play (1999). Written by Moby, who also performs vocals on the recording, "Porcelain" is a melancholic song with lyrics reflecting on the breakup of a relationship. It features a lush musical backing that incorporates reversed strings and various synthesized elements. While Moby initially expressed disdain over the song and its production, he was eventually talked into including it on Play.

One of the most successful singles from Play, "Porcelain" became a top five hit in the United Kingdom and entered various other national record charts. Contributing to the song's commercial exposure was its use in several forms of media, including a notable placement in the 2000 film The Beach. Music critics have highlighted "Porcelain" as a standout track on Play, and it has also been included on several year-end and all-time lists of the best songs. Two different music videos were produced for "Porcelain", directed by Jonas Åkerlund and Nick Brandt respectively.

== Background and composition ==
"Porcelain" was written and produced by Moby for his fifth studio album Play (1999). Moby recorded the song, and the rest of Play, in his apartment in Manhattan's Little Italy neighborhood. According to him, the song's lyrics were inspired by a personal experience: "I was involved with this really, really wonderful woman, and I loved her very much. But I knew deep in my heart of hearts that we had no business being romantically involved. So, it's sort of about being in love with someone but knowing you shouldn't be with them." Moby initially disliked "Porcelain", finding his production "mushy" and his vocals "really weak". He recalled that he "couldn't imagine anyone else wanting to listen to it" and had to be talked into including the song on Play.

"Porcelain"
A 24-second sample of "Porcelain"

Andy Gensler of The Hollywood Reporter described "Porcelain" as a "lush" downtempo track, while author Bruce Pollock called it a "moody techno dance track". The song features vocals performed by Moby, and introspective, wistful lyrics that describe "loving someone, but having to break up with them anyway." Composed in the key of E♭ major and running at a tempo of 95 beats per minute, "Porcelain" follows a constant four-chord progression (Gm−B♭−Fm−A♭) in the B♭ mixolydian mode, with the exception of a bridge midway through the song. The music incorporates several layered elements, including a reversed sample of strings from the Ernest Gold composition "Fight for Survival" (from his soundtrack for the 1960 film Exodus), synthesizer chords, piano and cello lines, vocal samples, and a drum machine rhythm. Pilar Basso performs additional vocals on the song.

== Release ==
The sixth single from Play, "Porcelain" was first released to radio on April 25, 2000, then issued as a physical single on June 12, 2000. Like other tracks from the album, "Porcelain" was licensed for use in numerous commercials and films. Prior to its release on Play, the song appeared in the 1998 film Playing by Heart and its accompanying soundtrack album. English director Danny Boyle featured "Porcelain" in his 2000 film The Beach, with Moby later crediting the film with significantly raising exposure of the song. "Porcelain" was also notably featured in commercials for the Volkswagen Polo, Bosch, and France Télécom.

"Porcelain" became one of the most successful singles from Play, and Moby has since referred to it as "probably the most signature song" on the album. It debuted at its peak position of number five on the UK Singles Chart. The single also charted in numerous other European countries, including France, Germany, Ireland, the Netherlands, and Switzerland. In Canada, "Porcelain" reached number 50 on the RPM national singles chart before the magazine was discontinued, while in the United States, it placed on several genre-specific Billboard charts tracking popular records in dance and rock markets.

== Critical reception and legacy ==
Entertainment Weekly's David Browne deemed "Porcelain" a standout track on Play, praising it as a "gorgeous" song anchored by Moby's "plaintive" vocal performance. Chicago Sun-Times critic Jim DeRogatis found the song "emotional and gripping" and remarked that if it "didn't move you (in every sense of the word), then you probably had no pulse." Alexandra Marshall of MTV described "Porcelain" as "a lush little snippet which sounds like a basement tape from a Magnetic Fields EP." The Birmingham Evening Mail said that the song's "sweeping melody and atmospheric vocals" create a "distinctive soundscape".

Naming it the 26th best single of 2000, Playlouder referred to "Porcelain" as Play's "most crushingly heavenly track" and stated that "familiarity made it no less of a glorious single." It was voted by critics as the 56th-best single of 2000 in The Village Voice's year-end Pazz & Jop poll. In 2003, Q listed "Porcelain" as one of the 1,001 best songs of all time. The Rock and Roll Hall of Fame featured the track in its exhibit "The Songs That Shaped Rock and Roll". Liana Jonas of AllMusic referred to "Porcelain" as "a groundbreaking recording", noting that the song's commercial success "helped bring electronica music into the limelight." Moby named his 2016 memoir after the song. Later, "Porcelain" was prominently sampled on rapper ASAP Rocky's 2018 song "ASAP Forever", with Moby being credited as a featured artist on the track. For his 19th studio album Reprise (2021), Moby recorded a new version of "Porcelain" featuring Jim James of My Morning Jacket on vocals, which was released as the first single from the album on March 26, 2021.

== Music videos ==
Two separate music videos were produced for "Porcelain". The first version, directed by Jonas Åkerlund, is primarily a simple closeup of a human eye; various images are reflected onto the eye throughout the entire video, including Moby performing the song, people smiling, and a piano being played. This version only aired in European markets and was not released in the US until its inclusion on the 2001 video album Play: The DVD.

The second video, directed by Nick Brandt, follows a driverless 1972 Cadillac DeVille, in which Moby is a passenger, as it travels through a city and a countryside, passing various people in slow motion. The car drives through a field, a forest, past cattle, and finally down a hillside going into the distance.

== Track listing ==
- CD single (CDMute252)
1. "Porcelain" (single version) – 3:32
2. "Flying Over the Dateline" – 4:48
3. "Summer" – 5:55
- Cassette single (CMute252)
1. "Porcelain" (single version) – 3:32
2. "Porcelain" (Torsten Stenzel's Vocaldubmix) – 8:22
3. "Summer" – 5:55
- CD single – remixes (LCDMute252)
1. "Porcelain" (Clubbed to Death version by Rob Dougan) – 6:36
2. "Porcelain" (Futureshock instrumental) – 8:21
3. "Porcelain" (Torsten Stenzel's edited remix) – 4:49
- 12-inch single – remixes (12Mute252)
1. "Porcelain" (Torsten Stenzel's remix) – 9:05
2. "Porcelain" (Force Mass Motion remix) – 8:32
- 12-inch single – remixes (L12Mute252)
1. "Porcelain" (Futureshock instrumental) – 8:21
2. "Porcelain" (Futureshock beats) – 3:59
3. "Porcelain" (Clubbed to Death variation by Rob Dougan) – 6:36
- 12-inch single (63881-27650-1)
1. "Porcelain" (Clubbed to Death variation by Rob Dougan) – 6:36
2. "Porcelain" (album version) – 4:01
3. "Porcelain" (Futureshock remix) – 8:35
4. "Porcelain" (Futureshock beats) – 3:59
- "Honey" / "Porcelain" CD single (MUSH019852)
1. "Honey" (remix edit; featuring Kelis) – 3:13
2. "Porcelain" (album mix) – 4:01
3. "Honey" (Fafu's 12" mix; featuring Kelis) – 6:19
4. "Porcelain" (Clubbed to Death variation by Rob Dougan) – 6:36
5. "Honey" (Moby's 118 mix) – 4:48
- Digital single – remixes (ANJ396D)
1. "Porcelain" (Above & Beyond remix) – 6:41
2. "Porcelain" (Arty remix) – 3:31
- Digital single – remix (SHA120S1)
1. "Porcelain" (Pola & Bryson remix) – 5:27
- Digital EP – remixes (ROCKD025)
1. "Porcelain" (Timo Maas & James Teej's Broken China dub) – 9:16
2. "Porcelain" (Sebastian Mullaert's Transformation mix) – 13:27

== Charts ==
=== Weekly charts ===
2000–2001 weekly chart performance for "Porcelain"
Chart (2000–2001)	Peak position
Australia (ARIA) with "Honey" (remix)	56
Australia Alternative (ARIA) with "Honey" (remix)	4
Australia Dance (ARIA) with "Honey" (remix)	25
Belgium (Ultratip Bubbling Under Flanders)	4
Belgium Dance (Ultratop Flanders)	22
Belgium (Ultratip Bubbling Under Wallonia)	2
Canada Top Singles (RPM)	50 (Note: "Porcelain" reached number 50 when RPM ceased publication in November 2000.)
Canada Adult Contemporary (RPM)	46 (Note: "Porcelain" reached number 46 when RPM ceased publication in November 2000.)
Eurochart Hot 100 (Music & Media)	24
France (SNEP)	99
Germany (GfK)	63
Iceland (Íslenski Listinn Topp 40)	14
Ireland (IRMA)	26
Ireland Dance (IRMA)	7
Italy (FIMI)	30
Netherlands (Dutch Top 40)	30
Netherlands (Single Top 100)	68
New Zealand (Recorded Music NZ)	17
Scottish Singles Sales (Official Charts)	6
Switzerland (Schweizer Hitparade)	79
UK Singles (Official Charts)	5
UK Indie (Official Charts)	2
US Adult Alternative Airplay (Billboard)	11
US Adult Pop Airplay (Billboard)	24
US Alternative Airplay (Billboard)	18
US Dance Club Songs (Billboard)	14
US Dance Singles Sales (Billboard)	38

2021 weekly chart performance for "Porcelain"
Chart (2021)	Peak position
Mexico Ingles Airplay (Billboard) Jim James version	19

=== Year-end charts ===
Year-end chart performance for "Porcelain"
Chart (2000)	Position
UK Singles (OCC)	187
US Adult Top 40 (Billboard)	68
US Modern Rock Tracks (Billboard)	64

=== Decade-end charts ===
Decade-end chart performance for "Porcelain"
Chart (2025–2026)	Position
Russia Streaming (TopHit)	199

== Certifications ==
Certifications for "Porcelain"
Region	Certification	Certified units/sales
Italy (FIMI)	Platinum	100,000^{‡}
Spain (Promusicae)	Gold	30,000^{‡}
United Kingdom (BPI)	Platinum	600,000^{‡}
^{‡} Sales+streaming figures based on certification alone.

== Release history ==
Release dates and formats for "Porcelain"
Region	Date	Format(s)	Version	Label(s)	Ref.
United States	April 25, 2000	Alternative radio	Original	V2	
United States	May 22, 2000	Hot adult contemporary radio	Original	V2	
United Kingdom	June 12, 2000	CD; cassette	Original	Mute	
United Kingdom	June 12, 2000	CD	Remixes	Mute	
United Kingdom	June 26, 2000	12-inch	Remixes	Mute	
United States	August 22, 2000	12-inch	Original	V2	
Australia	2000	CD	Original double A-side with "Honey" (remix)	Festival Mushroom	
New Zealand	2000	CD	Original double A-side with "Honey" (remix)	Festival Mushroom	
France	April 30, 2001	CD (enhanced)	Original	Labels; Mute	
Various	August 26, 2016	Digital download	Remixes	Anjunabeats	
Various	April 18, 2017	Digital download	Remixes	Shogun	
Various	May 26, 2017	Digital download	Remixes	Rockets & Ponies	
