= Find My Baby =

2000 single by Moby

Single by Moby

from the album Play
- B-side: "Flower"; "Whispering Wind"
- Released: 2000
- Genre: Breakbeat; techno
- Length: 3:58
- Label: Mute
- Songwriters: Moby; Willie Jones
- Producer: Moby

Moby singles chronology
"South Side" (2000)	"Find My Baby" (2000)	"We Are All Made of Stars" (2002)

Music video
- "Find My Baby" on YouTube

"Find My Baby" is a song by American electronic musician Moby. It was released as the eighth and final single from his fifth studio album Play in November 2000. The song features samples from the song "Joe Lee's Rock" by Boy Blue.

== Track listings ==
- CD single (7243 8972012 9)
1. "Find My Baby" – 3:58
2. "Honey" (remix edit featuring Kelis) – 3:13
3. "Flower" – 3:25
- CD single (8967742)
1. "Find My Baby" (album version) – 3:58
2. "Whispering Wind" – 6:08
3. "Find My Baby" (video) – 3:09

== Charts ==
Chart (2000–2001)	Peak position
Belgium (Ultratip Bubbling Under Wallonia)	4
France (SNEP)	53
Italy (FIMI)	36
Netherlands (Single Top 100)	94
