= Bodyrock (song) =

1999 single by Moby

Single by Moby

from the album Play
- B-side: "Sunspot"; "Arp"; "Sunday"
- Released: July 12, 1999
- Genre: Electronic rock; big beat
- Length: 3:34 (album version); 3:22 (single version)
- Label: V2
- Songwriters: Moby; Gabriel Jackson; Bobby Robinson
- Producer: Moby

Moby singles chronology
"Run On" (1999)	"Bodyrock" (1999)	"Why Does My Heart Feel So Bad?" (1999)

Music video
- "Moby - Bodyrock (Fire Version)" on YouTube

"Bodyrock" is a song by American electronica musician Moby. It was released as the third single from his fifth studio album Play on July 12, 1999. Heavily inspired by hip hop music, the song incorporates vocal samples from "Love Rap" by Spoonie Gee and the Treacherous Three. The single peaked at number 38 on the UK Singles Chart.

== Background and composition ==
"Bodyrock" incorporates vocal samples from "Love Rap" by American hip hop artists Spoonie Gee and the Treacherous Three. Moby sampled the song from his first mixtape, "maybe in 1981, off of the Mr. Magic Show on WBLS." The main guitar line on "Bodyrock" was inspired by that of "What We All Want" by British post-punk band Gang of Four. Moby's production also incorporates orchestral elements, and he found it "kind of funny to have an orchestral chorus on what is essentially a hip-hop song." American rapper Nikki D performs additional vocals on the song.

In a review of Play, John Bush of AllMusic notes "Bodyrock"'s big beat elements and writes that its "similarities to contemporary dance superstars like Fatboy Slim and Chemical Brothers are just a bit too close for comfort." Moby later recounted that both of his managers tried to convince him not to include the song on the album, as they found it "really tacky" and "thought it sounded like a Fatboy Slim ripoff—which I guess it kind of did," but that he himself liked the song due to the personal significance of the "Love Rap" sample to him.

== Music videos ==
Three music videos were produced for "Bodyrock". The version released in the United Kingdom, directed by Fredrik Bond, features a man frenetically dancing in an urban setting while Moby looks on. During the video, Moby acts as an effects man, turning on a wind machine and later a flame bar, accidentally blowing up a nearby car. An alternate second cut was later released, featuring audition footage of dancers supposedly auditioning for the video; the video can be seen two ways: one with only the dancers, and one intercutting to Moby.

The third version, directed by Steve Carr and released in the United States, features Moby wearing a special pair of sunglasses that allows him to see dancers wherever he goes. Hip hop group Run-DMC make a cameo appearance in the Carr-directed version.

== Track listing ==
- CD single
1. "Bodyrock" – 3:22
2. "Sunspot" – 6:46
3. "Arp" – 6:30
- CD single – remixes
1. "Bodyrock" (Olav Basoski's Da Hot Da Funk Freak Remix) – 6:24
2. "Bodyrock" (Hybrid's Bodyshock Remix) – 7:44
3. "Bodyrock" (Rae & Christian Remix) – 5:33
- 12-inch single
1. "Bodyrock" (Olav Basoski's Da Hot Da Funk Freak Remix) – 6:24
2. "Bodyrock" (B&H's Bodyrob Mix) – 4:42
3. "Bodyrock" (Dani König Remix) – 8:36
- CD single
1. "Bodyrock" (Dean Honer Mix) – 3:21
2. "Bodyrock" (Olav Basoski's Da Hot Da Funk Freak Remix) – 6:24
3. "Bodyrock" (Rae & Christian Remix) – 5:33
4. "Bodyrock" (B&H's Bodyrob Mix) – 4:42
5. "Bodyrock" (Dani König Remix) – 8:13
6. "Bodyrock" (album mix) – 3:34
7. "Sunday" – 5:01
8. "Sunspot" – 6:46
- 12-inch single
1. "Bodyrock" (Olav Basoski's Da Hot Da Funk Freak Remix) – 6:24
2. "Bodyrock" (Rae & Christian Remix) – 5:33
3. "Bodyrock" (Dani König Remix) – 8:13
4. "Bodyrock" (Dean Honer Mix) – 3:21

== Charts ==
Weekly chart performance for "Bodyrock"
Chart (1999–2000)	Peak position
New Zealand (Recorded Music NZ)	20
Scotland Singles (OCC)	36
UK Singles (OCC)	38
UK Dance (OCC)	7
UK Indie (OCC)	3
US Alternative Airplay (Billboard)	26
US Dance Club Songs (Billboard)	6
US Dance Singles Sales (Billboard)	17

== Release history ==
Release dates and formats for "Bodyrock"
Region	Date	Format(s)	Label(s)	Ref.
United Kingdom	July 12, 1999	12-inch vinyl; CD	Mute	
United States	April 18, 2000	Contemporary hit radio	V2	
