= Natural Blues =

2000 single by Moby

Single by Moby

from the album Play
- B-side: "Whispering Wind"; "Sick in the System"
- Released: March 6, 2000
- Studio: Moby's home studio (Manhattan, New York)
- Genre: Blues; electronica
- Length: 4:12 (album version); 3:03 (single version)
- Label: V2; Mute
- Songwriters: Moby; Vera Hall; Alan Lomax
- Producer: Moby

Moby singles chronology
"Why Does My Heart Feel So Bad?" (1999)	"Natural Blues" (2000)	"Porcelain" (2000)

Alternative cover
- German CD maxi-single

Music video
- "Natural Blues" on YouTube

"Natural Blues" is a song by American electronic musician Moby. It was released on March 6, 2000, as the fifth single from his fifth studio album, Play (1999). The song is built around vocals sampled from the 1937 song "Trouble So Hard" by American folk singer Vera Hall. "Natural Blues" was one of several songs on Play produced by Moby based on samples obtained from albums of American folk music originally compiled by field collector Alan Lomax. In the United Kingdom, "Natural Blues" peaked at number 11 on the UK Singles Chart. In Iceland, it peaked at number one.

== Background and composition ==
"Natural Blues" was produced by Moby for his fifth studio album Play, and contains samples from "Trouble So Hard" by American folk singer Vera Hall. Moby obtained the samples from a box set of folk music compiled by field collector Alan Lomax, and Hall and Lomax receive co-writing credits on the track. "Natural Blues", described by Moby as a "quite ethereal and mournful" song, is built around loops of Hall's vocals from the original recording. Moby had difficulties mixing the track and as a result he considered not including it on Play, but he eventually produced a satisfactory mix with assistance from the British duo 1 Giant Leap. English electronic music group I Monster are also credited with mixing duties.

== Critical reception ==
The Daily Vault's Benjamin Ray described the song as "a better example of the blues lyrics-meets-electronic pastiche, with a quietly insistent beat that slowly builds up to a climax of keyboards and voices." Johnny Cigarettes from NME wrote that "on 'Natural Blues' the old-school blues crooner sounds like he always had a live rave PA element to his music. This is when Moby's much-vaunted eclecticism works brilliantly, sounding more godlike than Jesus Jones-like." Scott Marc Becker from Salon stated that it is "among the album's best tracks". He added that singer Vera Hall is "as potent in Moby's hands as she was a cappella, the ghost of her voice resonating as if she were still alive." Vickie Ilmer from Star Tribune called it "a hymnlike introspective discourse questioning hard times and retaining spirituality".

== Music videos ==
Photographer and filmmaker David LaChapelle directed the accompanying promotional music video for "Natural Blues". LaChapelle had first indicated his interest in directing the video, and Moby, while a fan of his work, expressed hesitance at the idea due to the "bright and flashy" nature of his prior work, which he felt would not suit the song. However, LaChapelle reassured Moby that his vision for the video was "something quite subdued and earnest". The video depicts an elderly, wheelchair-using version of Moby in a retirement home watching video clips of himself as a young man. Fairuza Balk plays Moby's girlfriend in several of the clips. Eventually, an angelic figure, played by Christina Ricci, appears and carries him away.

As a child, LaChapelle made frequent visits to a retirement community where his mother worked as a nurse. He took the inspiration for the video's concept directly from a nightmare in which he found himself elderly, unable to move, left in a wheelchair in the hallway of a nursing facility with other senior citizens. LaChapelle interpreted the song as sounding "like someone at the end of their life, reconciling with being at the end of their life" and felt that the retirement home concept suited the video. He added: "I was thinking that you can have this fabulous life, young and having fun, and in 60 years, who the hell knows where we could be? We could all be forgotten, warehoused somewhere." Extensive make-up was used on Moby to give him his elderly appearance in the video. The video later won the award for Best Video at the 2000 MTV Europe Music Awards, while also receiving a nomination for Best International Video at the 2000 MuchMusic Video Awards.

An alternate animated music video was also directed by Susi Wilkinson, Hotessa Laurence, and Filipe Alçada in the same style and featuring the same characters as in the music video for Moby's prior single "Why Does My Heart Feel So Bad?".

== 2021 version ==
Moby recorded a new version of the song for his 2021 album Reprise. The track, which was released as a single a month in advance of the album, featured lead vocals by Gregory Porter and Amythyst Kiah.

== Track listings ==
- US CD single
1. "Natural Blues" (radio edit) – 3:03
2. "Natural Blues" (Perfecto Remix) – 8:12
3. "Natural Blues" (album version) – 4:12
4. "Natural Blues" (Mike D. Remix – edit) – 4:14
5. "Whispering Wind" – 6:08
- UK CD1
1. "Natural Blues" (single version) – 3:03
2. "The Whispering Wind" – 6:08
3. "Sick in the System" – 4:17
- UK CD2
1. "Natural Blues" (Perfecto Remix) – 8:12
2. "Natural Blues" (Mike D edit) – 4:14
3. "Natural Blues" (Peace Division edit) – 6:29
- UK 12-inch single 1
1. "Natural Blues" – 4:17
2. "Natural Blues" (Mike D Remix) – 6:22
3. "Natural Blues" (Perfecto Dub) – 7:51
- UK 12-inch single 2
1. "Natural Blues" (Katcha Remix) – 7:45
2. "Natural Blues" (Peace Division Dub) – 8:14

== Charts ==
=== Original version ===
==== Weekly charts ====
Chart (2000–2001)	Peak position
Belgium (Ultratip Bubbling Under Flanders)	5
Belgium (Ultratop 50 Wallonia)	28
Canada Dance/Urban (RPM)	27
Europe (Eurochart Hot 100)	41
Finland (Suomen virallinen lista)	13
France (SNEP)	9
Germany (GfK)	46
Iceland (Íslenski Listinn Topp 40)	1
Ireland (IRMA)	18
Ireland Dance (IRMA)	2
Italy (Musica e dischi)	9
Netherlands (Dutch Top 40)	32
Netherlands (Single Top 100)	66
Scottish Singles Sales (Official Charts)	7
Switzerland (Schweizer Hitparade)	28
UK Singles (Official Charts)	11
UK Dance (Official Charts)	7
UK Independent (Official Charts)	3
US Dance Club Play (Billboard)	11
US Maxi-Singles Sales (Billboard)	6
US Modern Rock Tracks (Billboard)	24

==== Year-end charts ====
Chart (2000)	Position
Belgium (Ultratop 50 Wallonia)	96
France (SNEP)	39
Iceland (Íslenski Listinn Topp 40)	50
US Maxi-Singles Sales (Billboard)	46
US Modern Rock Tracks (Billboard)	89

=== Lulu Rouge vs. Stella Polaris remix ===
Chart (2010)	Peak position
Denmark (Tracklisten)	21

=== Showtek remix ===
Chart (2018)	Peak position
Belgium (Ultratip Bubbling Under Wallonia)	38

== Certifications ==
Region	Certification	Certified units/sales
United Kingdom (BPI)	Silver	200,000^{‡}
^{‡} Sales+streaming figures based on certification alone.

== Release history ==
Region	Date	Format(s)	Label(s)	Ref(s).
United States	December 14, 1999	Alternative radio	V2	
United Kingdom	March 6, 2000	12-inch vinyl; CD	Mute	

== Covers ==
A cover of "Natural Blues" performed live at First Avenue by American musician Mark Mallman was released on his 2003 album Live from First Avenue, Minneapolis.
