= Why Does My Heart Feel So Bad? =

1999 single by Moby

Single by Moby

from the album Play
- A-side: "Honey" (2000)
- B-side: "Flying Foxes"; "Princess"
- Written: 1992
- Released: October 11, 1999
- Studio: Moby's home studio (Manhattan, New York)
- Genre: Chill-out
- Length: 4:23 (album version); 3:45 (single version)
- Label: Mute
- Songwriter: Moby
- Producer: Moby

Moby singles chronology
| "Bodyrock" (1999) | "Why Does My Heart Feel So Bad?" (1999) | "Natural Blues" (2000) |

Music video
- "Moby - Why Does My Heart Feel So Bad?" on YouTube

"Why Does My Heart Feel So Bad?" is a song by American electronica musician Moby. It was released on October 11, 1999, as the fourth single from his fifth studio album Play. It became a hit in several regions, including German-speaking Europe and the United Kingdom.

== Background and composition ==
"Why Does My Heart Feel So Bad?" was originally written by Moby in 1992 in an iteration that Moby would describe as "really bad techno... Just mediocre, generic techno." Years later, Moby revisited the song, reproducing it as a considerably slower and more "mournful and romantic" song, which he eventually included on his fifth studio album, Play after being encouraged to do so by his manager, Eric Härle. The track is based on the samples from the Banks Brothers' "He'll Roll Your Burdens Away" (1963).

== Release ==
"Why Does My Heart Feel So Bad?" was released on October 11, 1999, by Mute Records as the fourth single from Play. The single peaked at number 16 on the UK Singles Chart. It also reached the top 10 on the charts of several other European territories, including Austria, Switzerland, and Germany, where it reached number three, its highest peak chart position. At the time, Moby felt that the single's success in Germany was "as far as any success for Play was gonna go."

On October 16, 2000, "Why Does My Heart Feel So Bad?" was re-released as a double A-side single with a remix of "Honey" featuring American R&B singer Kelis, reaching number 17 on the UK Singles Chart.

== Music video ==
The music video for "Why Does My Heart Feel So Bad?" was directed by Filipe Alçada, Hotessa Laurence, and Susi Wilkinson. It is completely animated and features the character Little Idiot, who is also featured on the "Why Does My Heart Feel So Bad?" single cover. The video depicts Little Idiot and his pet dog coming down from the Moon to Earth and traveling through a variety of locations, before eventually climbing back to the Moon on a ladder.

== Track listings ==
- UK CD1
1. "Why Does My Heart Feel So Bad?"
2. "Flying Foxes"
3. "Princess"
4. "Why Does My Heart Feel So Bad?" (video)
- UK CD2
1. "Why Does My Heart Feel So Bad?" (ATB remix)
2. "Why Does My Heart Feel So Bad?" (Ferry Corsten remix)
3. "Why Does My Heart Feel So Bad?" (Subsonic Legacy remix)
- UK 12-inch single

A1. "Why Does My Heart Feel So Bad?" (ATB remix)
B1. "Why Does My Heart Feel So Bad?" (Ferry Corsten remix)
B2. "Why Does My Heart Feel So Bad?" (Sharp Roadster club edit)

- UK cassette single (with "Honey")
1. "Why Does My Heart Feel So Bad?"
2. "Honey" (remix edit featuring Kelis)
- UK CD1 (with "Honey")
1. "Why Does My Heart Feel So Bad?"
2. "Honey" (remix edit featuring Kelis)
3. "Flower" – 3:25
- UK CD2 (with "Honey")
1. "Honey" (Fafu's 12-inch mix featuring Kelis)
2. "Why Does My Heart Feel So Bad?" (Red Jerry's String & Breaks mix)
3. "The Sun Never Stops Setting"
- Australian CD single
1. "Why Does My Heart Feel So Bad?"
2. "Flying Foxes"
3. "Princess"
4. "Why Does My Heart Feel So Bad?" (ATB remix)
5. "Why Does My Heart Feel So Bad?" (Ferry Corsten remix)
6. "Why Does My Heart Feel So Bad?" (Subsonic Legacy remix)

== Charts ==
=== Weekly charts ===
| Chart (1999–2000) | Peak position |
|---|---|
| Australia (ARIA) | 33 |
| Austria (Ö3 Austria Top 40) | 4 |
| Belgium (Ultratip Bubbling Under Flanders) | 11 |
| Europe (Eurochart Hot 100) | 6 |
| Germany (GfK) | 3 |
| Iceland (Íslenski Listinn Topp 40) | 15 |
| Ireland (IRMA) | 31 |
| Ireland Dance (IRMA) | 9 |
| Latvia (Latvijas Top 40) | 7 |
| Netherlands (Dutch Top 40 Tipparade) | 5 |
| Netherlands (Single Top 100) | 61 |
| New Zealand (Recorded Music NZ) | 28 |
| Scottish Singles Sales (Official Charts) | 11 |
| Scottish Singles Sales (Official Charts) with "Honey" (remix) | 17 |
| Switzerland (Schweizer Hitparade) | 4 |
| UK Singles (Official Charts) | 16 |
| UK Singles (Official Charts) with "Honey" (remix) | 17 |
| UK Dance (Official Charts) | 8 |
| UK Independent (Official Charts) | 3 |
| UK Independent (Official Charts) with "Honey" (remix) | 7 |

=== Year-end charts ===
| Chart (2000) | Position |
|---|---|
| Austria (Ö3 Austria Top 40) | 34 |
| Europe (Eurochart Hot 100) | 74 |
| Germany (Media Control) | 26 |
| Switzerland (Schweizer Hitparade) | 26 |

== Certifications ==
| Region | Certification | Certified units/sales |
|---|---|---|
| Austria (IFPI Austria) | Gold | 25,000^{*} |
| Germany (BVMI) | Platinum | 500,000^{^} |
| United Kingdom (BPI) | Gold | 400,000^{‡} |
^{*} Sales figures based on certification alone.^{^} Shipments figures based on certification alone.^{‡} Sales+streaming figures based on certification alone.
