= All Visible Objects =

Studio album by Moby
- Released: May 15, 2020
- Studio: EastWest Studios, Hollywood, California and the UK
- Genre: Electronic; ambient
- Length: 72:39
- Label: Little Idiot; Mute
- Producer: Moby

Moby chronology
Long Ambients 2 (2019)	All Visible Objects (2020)	Live Ambients – Improvised Recordings Vol. 1 (2020)

Singles from All Visible Objects
- 1. "Power Is Taken" Released: January 14, 2020; 2. "Too Much Change" Released: May 1, 2020; 3. "My Only Love" Released: July 3, 2020; 4. "Morningside" Released: August 28, 2020; 5. "Rise Up in Love" Released: October 30, 2020; 6. "Forever" Released: November 13, 2020; 7. "Tecie" Released: December 4, 2020; 8. "Refuge" Released: December 4, 2020

All Visible Objects is the seventeenth studio album by American musician and singer-songwriter Moby, released on May 15, 2020 on Little Idiot and Mute Records. The album includes the singles "Power Is Taken", "Too Much Change", "My Only Love", "Morningside", "Rise Up in Love", "Forever", "Tecie" and "Refuge".

== Background ==
In March 2019, Moby released his previous album, Long Ambients 2, which continued the format of a collection of long-form ambient tracks that he had produced for the first, Long Ambients 1: Calm. Sleep. He then stepped away from music to promote Then It Fell Apart, his second autobiography that focuses on his life and career between 1999 and 2009. The book attracted criticism from Natalie Portman, after Moby insinuated the pair had dated, which she denied and called him "creepy". After a series of appearances to promote the book, Moby cancelled the remaining dates and from June 2019, largely avoided the public eye.

Moby announced All Visible Objects on his blog on January 14, 2020. It also revealed its initial release date of March 6 and the front cover. On the same day the first single and video, "Power is Taken", featuring Dead Kennedys drummer D. H. Peligro and rapper Boogie, was released. Moby announced that profits generated from the album will be given to charity, with each track raising funds for a different non-profit, animal rights, or human rights cause. These are: Brighter Green, Mercy for Animals, Rainforest Action Network, Extinction Rebellion, the American Civil Liberties Union, Animal Equality, the Physicians Committee for Responsible Medicine, The Humane League, the International Anti-Poaching Foundation, The Good Food Institute, and the Indivisible Project. In a press statement posted on his website, Moby summarised the eleven charities in a paragraph that also contained the title of the dedicated track within the text.

== Reception ==
Professional ratings
Aggregate scores
Source	Rating
AnyDecentMusic?	5.8/10
Metacritic	62/100
Review scores
Source	Rating
AllMusic	4/5 stars
The Arts Desk	2/5 stars
Classic Pop	6/10
Exclaim!	7/10
Evening Standard	2/5 stars
The Guardian	2/5 stars
musicOMH	3/5 stars
Pitchfork	5.8/10
Sputnikmusic	4/5
Tom Hull – on the Web	B+

All Visible Objects received mixed reviews from critics. On Metacritic, the album has a score of 62 out of 100 based on 8 reviews, which indicates "generally favorable reviews". "Power Is Taken" has been compared to Moby's electronic dance music sound from the 1990s, away from the downtempo style of Everything Was Beautiful, and Nothing Hurt (2018), but "filled with a bold call to political action". Thomas H. Green of The Arts Desk commented, "Moby’s last three albums, including two as The Void Pacific Choir, have all been bedded down in his rage and sadness at what his country – and the world – is undergoing. All Visible Objects seems to be a conscious attempt to move away from that and explore new territory – in this case a behemoth, stadium sized sonic update on what he did in the late-Nineties – but it proves to be a misstep. However, given he's handing all the proceeds of the album to various charities, we can only wish it every bit of luck." Rachel Aroesti in her review for The Guardian stated, "Certainly, All Visible Objects, Moby’s 17th album, doesn’t feel like a punt for musical relevance. The first half dances between feverish house, dazed electronica, rave, techno and dub, the second comprises ambient and slightly po-faced pieces built from piano figures and synth washes. The overriding impression of both modes is nostalgia, not least for the uplifting, utopian properties of dance music." Ryan Middleton of Magnetic Magazine added, "Moby finds himself surging around his various influences on this album. It is strongly linked to his love of ambient music and orchestral arrangements, but also finds time to rage against the status quo. There are moments of beauty and moments to dance. It isn’t a traditional dancefloor record, but there has never been anything traditional about Moby’s music." Evening Standard's Jahan Embley wrote, "Overall though, you feel Moby, with 16 studio albums behind him, could and should do better."

== Track listing ==
All tracks written and produced by Moby, except "My Only Love" by Bryan Ferry and "Refuge" by Moby and Linton Kwesi Johnson.

All Visible Objects track listing
No.	Title	Lead vocals	Length
1.	"Morningside"	Apollo Jane	5:30
2.	"My Only Love"	Mindy Jones	5:44
3.	"Refuge"	Linton Kwesi Johnson	5:44
4.	"One Last Time"	Moby, Apollo Jane	5:34
5.	"Power Is Taken"	D. H. Peligro, Boogie	5:47
6.	"Rise Up in Love"	Apollo Jane	5:47
7.	"Forever"	Moby	5:17
8.	"Too Much Change"	Apollo Jane	9:46
9.	"Separation"		6:40
10.	"Tecie"		7:32
11.	"All Visible Objects"		9:18
Total length:			72:39

== Personnel ==
Credits adapted from the album's liner notes.

Music

- Moby – instruments, vocals on "Forever" and "One Last Time"
- Apollo Jane – vocals on "Morningside", "One Last Time", "Rise Up in Love", "Too Much Change", and "Tecie"
- Mindy Jones – vocals on "My Only Love"
- Linton Kwesi Johnson – vocals on "Refuge" (taken from "Two Sides of Silence" from Bass Culture (1980))
- D. H. Peligro – vocals on "Power Is Taken"
- Boogie – vocals on "Power Is Taken"

Production

- Moby – production, mixing, cover art
- Jonathan Nesvadba – studio management
- Chris Kahn – mixing assistant at EastWest Studios
- Joe Lambert – mastering
- Mike Jones – cover layout

== Charts ==
Chart performance for All Visible Objects
Chart (2020)	Peak position
Austrian Albums (Ö3 Austria)	59
Belgian Albums (Ultratop Flanders)	25
Belgian Albums (Ultratop Wallonia)	54
French Albums (SNEP)	160
German Albums (Offizielle Top 100)	28
Swiss Albums (Schweizer Hitparade)	14
