= Long Ambients 2 =

Studio album by Moby
- Released: March 15, 2019
- Studio: Moby's home studio in Los Angeles, California
- Genre: Ambient
- Length: 217:46
- Label: Little Idiot
- Producer: Moby

Moby chronology
Everything Was Beautiful, and Nothing Hurt (2018)	Long Ambients 2 (2019)	All Visible Objects (2020)

Long Ambients 2 (printed as Long Ambients Two on the cover) is the sixteenth studio album by American electronic musician, songwriter, and producer Moby, released on March 15, 2019. It is the sequel to his previous ambient album, Long Ambients 1: Calm. Sleep. (2016).

"LA12"

"LA13"

"LA14"

"LA15"

"LA16"

"LA17"

== Background ==
Long Ambients 2 is the follow-up to Long Ambients 1: Calm. Sleep. (2016) and offers more than 200 minutes of ambient music to put a listener to sleep or to meditate. Moby had struggled to find music that helped him sleep better, so he decided to compose some himself. He intended the music to also help people calm down, reduce anxiety, and aid in their own sleep issues. "LA15" is an extended version/remix of "LA8" from Long Ambients 1, while "LA16" is an extended version of "LA10". The other four pieces are entirely new to this album. Moby explained, "Most of the music in my life I’ve made with an audience in mind, but this long ambient music I originally just made for myself."

== Release ==
The album was released on March 15, 2019 to commemorate World Sleep Day. It was available exclusively on Calm, a meditation app, for the first thirty days before it was released on other streaming and music download platforms.

== Track listing ==
No.	Title	Length
1.	"LA12"	47:02
2.	"LA13"	26:54
3.	"LA14"	39:18
4.	"LA15"	32:08
5.	"LA16"	29:48
6.	"LA17"	42:36
Total length:		217:46

== Chart performance ==
Chart (2019)	Peak position
US New Age Albums (Billboard)	3

== See also ==
- Sleep, album by Max Richter created to fit a full night's sleep
