= Little Pine =

Little Pine can refer to:

- California
  - Little Pine, California, former name of Independence, California
- Minnesota
  - Little Pine Township, Minnesota
- Pennsylvania
  - Little Pine Creek
  - Little Pine State Park

== Companies ==
- Little Pine (restaurant), vegan bistro in Los Angeles, California
