= J.P. Bimeni =

British musician (born 1976)

- Born: Jean Patrick Bimenyimana Serukamba; 1976.12.04; Bujumbura, Burundi
- Other name: Mudibu
- Occupations: Singer; songwriter; musician
- Years active: 2017–present
- Musical career
- Genre: Soul
- Instruments: Vocals, guitar
- Labels: Tucxone Records; Lovemonk
- Website: jp-bimeni.com

Jean-Patrick Bimenyimana Serukamba (born December 1976), also known as J.P. Bimeni and Mudibu, is a Burundian-British singer, songwriter, and musician.

== Early life ==
J.P. Bimeni was born on the 4th of December 1976, in Burundian capital Bujumbura. His father- Sylvester Serukamba, was in the military and his mother was a descendant of the generations old royal family. Bimeni was raised by his mother, Nahimana Speciose, alongside his three brothers. Bimeni was sent to a convent in the Burundian countryside for safety during his youth.

At the start of the Burundian Civil War, in October 1993, when Bimeni was 16, he survived a massacre at his school "Lycée Kibimba", now notorious for the incident. Soon after the events at Kibimba he was shot in the chest, and at the hospital received medication that caused a dangerous reaction causing him to lose half of his body weight. He was airlifted to Nairobi's Aga Khan hospital where they managed to save his life despite doctors having little hope and a priest coming to read his last rites.

He registered as a refugee and applied for a scholarship program run by the Hugh Pilkington Trust. In 1995, he earned a scholarship to Atlantic College in Wales even though he spoke little English. He earned an International Baccalaureate in Oxford and a degree in politics from the University of Central Lancashire in Preston.

In 2001, Bimeni moved to London, where his music career officially began. As a child, he had always dreamed of being an artist and performer, inspired by figures such as Michael Jackson. The first records he collected included Ray Charles, Otis Redding, Bob Marley and Marvin Gaye. He taught himself to play guitar alone and began to sing his songs at open mics and jam sessions, meeting and befriending artists like Roots Manuva, Adele, Amy Winehouse and Shingai Shoniwa along the way.

== Career ==
For several years, he performed with different bands: Mantilla, covering Sam & Dave; Jezebel Sextet, covering Otis Redding.

In 2017, he sang with a funk group, Speedometer, in Spain. The Tucxone Records label spotted Bimeni and offered him a chance to tour with the Spanish band The Black Belts. In 2018, the album Free Me was released to wide acclaim. Craig Charles from BBC Radio 6 Music said "very few people have a soul story to compare and from all the trauma has emerged one of the very best soul voices we've heard for a very long time." To Radio France Bimeni's voice, recalling tones of Otis Redding and Marvin Gaye earned him the nickname 'the Burundian Otis Redding.' This album, with classic 60s-sounding, Motown and Stax inspired grooves, was written by musical director Eduardo Martínez and songwriter Marc Ibarz. Bimeni imbued these tales with his tragic experiences making ‘Free Me’ a deep soul soundtrack to his life: "When I sing I feel like I'm cleansing myself; music is a way for me to forget."

In 2022, the second album Give Me Hope was released and on it he paid tribute to James Stern and Martin Luther King.

In 2021, Bimeni returned to Burundi for the first time in 10 years. He performed for the first time in Rwanda in 2023 under his childhood nickname Mudibu. Bimeni released his first two albums under the Mudibu moniker.

In 2024, Bimeni was invited by Moby to work on his new album Always Centered at Night with the title Should Sleep. He declared :

It is surreal for me, as I think about the journey I am on, have been on and am now working with Moby (internal scream, over the moon). I feel that through this work, there's simple wisdom, warmth, healing, uplift, breath and steadfastness.

== Discography ==
=== Albums ===
- Slow Me (2015) under Mudibu
- Inzatsa (2015) under Mudibu
- Free Me (2018)
- Give Me Hope (2022)

=== Collaborations ===
- "Should Sleep" with Moby (2023)
- "Cut Me Loose" with Stone Foundation from the Album "The Revival of Survival" (2024)
