= Always Centered at Night =

Studio album by Moby
- Released: June 14, 2024
- Genre: Electronic
- Length: 59:54
- Labels: Always Centered at Night; Mute
- Producer: Moby

Moby chronology
Resound NYC (2023)	Always Centered at Night (2024)	Future Quiet (2026)

Singles from Always Centered at Night
- 1. "Medusa" Released: June 1, 2022; 2. "On Air" Released: August 31, 2022; 3. "Fall Back" Released: November 2, 2022; 4. "Ache For" Released: December 14, 2022; 5. "Transit" Released: January 18, 2023; 6. "Should Sleep" Released: September 13, 2023; 7. "We're Going Wrong" Released: October 17, 2023; 8. "Dark Days" Released: March 19, 2024

Always Centered at Night is the twenty-second studio album by American musician Moby, released on June 14, 2024, through Moby's label of the same name, Always Centered at Night, and Mute Records. Moby's first release on the label was the album's first single, "Medusa" featuring Aynzli Jones, issued in June 2022. Similarly to his 2023 album Resound NYC, it features collaborations with vocalists on all tracks, although the tracks are new. The album also includes a collaboration with British writer and musician Benjamin Zephaniah, who died in 2023.

== Background ==
Moby commented that a thread throughout his career has been collaborating with singers and although the album "continues [his] love of collaborating", the focus for Always Centered at Night was "working with amazing singers who might not be as well known as David Bowie and Gregory Porter".

== Critical reception ==
Professional ratings
Aggregate scores
Source	Rating
Metacritic	70/100
Review scores
Source	Rating
AllMusic	3.5/5 stars
The Arts Desk	2/5 stars
Clash	7/10
The Line of Best Fit	7/10
MusicOMH	2.5/5 stars
PopMatters	7/10
Record Collector	3/5 stars
Spill Magazine	5/5 stars
Sputnikmusic	3.8/5
Uncut	7/10

Always Centered at Night received a score of 70 out of 100 on review aggregator Metacritic based on seven critics' reviews, which the website categorized as "generally favorable" reception. Clash's Robin Murray wrote that Moby acts "a fulcrum for a veritable galaxy of collaborators, resulting in an enriching, and surprising full length" and called the album both "a record replete with highlights" as well as "a rewarding experience which will do much to push back unjust preconceptions". Puja Nandi of The Line of Best Fit described it as "a pick 'n' mix assortment of different styles influenced by the last few decades of electronic music". Uncut's Stephen Dalton felt that the "luxuriant collection is one of Moby's most consistently inviting and uplifting in years".

Raul Stanciu of Sputnikmusic wrote that Always Centered at Night "boasts a charm of its own. It does feel more varied and relaxed than its predecessors, compiling bits of everything we've heard Moby compose since 2008's Last Night". Reviewing the album for AllMusic, Paul Simpson remarked that while it "is certainly an electronic album, with hardly any obvious rock influences, it's not strictly made up of dance tracks, either" and it "actually sounds much closer to his pop-minded albums, except that he doesn't sing any of the songs. (Nothing against Moby's own voice, but the guest vocalists are welcome, considering that they all sound much better than him.)" MusicOMH's John Murphy found it to be "beautifully produced, with an almost cinematic sheen to many of the tracks" but also "all very one-note" as it is "stuffed with mid-tempo mood pieces that never really go anywhere".

== Track listing ==
Always Centered at Night track listing
No.	Title	Writer(s)	Length
1.	"On Air" (with Serpentwithfeet)	Moby; JoSiah Wise	4:11
2.	"Dark Days" (with Lady Blackbird)	Moby; Chris Seefried; Marley Munroe	3:32
3.	"Where Is Your Pride?" (with Benjamin Zephaniah)	Moby; Benjamin Zephaniah	3:38
4.	"Transit" (with Gaidaa)	Moby; Gaidaa Anwar Ali	5:11
5.	"Wild Flame" (with Danaé)	Moby; Danaé	4:41
6.	"Precious Mind" (with India Carney)	Moby; India Carney	4:54
7.	"Should Sleep" (with J.P. Bimeni)	Moby; Jean-Patrick Bimenyimana	4:27
8.	"Feelings Come Undone" (featuring Raquel Rodriguez)	Moby	4:05
9.	"Medusa" (with Aynzli Jones)	Moby; Aynzli Jones; Richard Hall	6:04
10.	"We're Going Wrong" (with Brie O'Banion)	Jack Bruce	4:19
11.	"Fall Back" (with Akemi Fox)	Moby; Akemi Fox Thompson	4:12
12.	"Sweet Moon" (with Choklate)	Moby	5:12
13.	"Ache For" (with José James)	Moby; José James; Talia Billig	5:28
Total length:			59:54

== Formats ==
Always Centered at Night was released on CD, LP, and digital downloads.

== Charts ==
Chart performance for Always Centered at Night
Chart (2024)	Peak position
Belgian Albums (Ultratop Flanders)	88
Belgian Albums (Ultratop Wallonia)	35
German Albums (Offizielle Top 100)	18
Scottish Albums (Official Charts)	43
Swiss Albums (Schweizer Hitparade)	25
UK Album Downloads (Official Charts)	26
UK Albums Sales (OCC)	35
UK Dance Albums (Official Charts)	3
UK Independent Albums (Official Charts)	12
