= The End of Everything (album) =

Studio album by Voodoo Child
- Released: July 16, 1996
- Length: 53:51 (UK) 66:19 (US)
- Label: Trophy; Mute; Elektra (US)
- Producer: Voodoo Child

Voodoo Child chronology
Demons/Horses (1994)	The End of Everything (1996)	Baby Monkey (2004)

The End of Everything is the first album by Voodoo Child, a pseudonym of American electronica musician Moby. It was released in July 1996 by record labels Trophy, Mute and Elektra.

== Release ==
The End of Everything was released on July 16, 1996, by record labels Trophy and Mute.

The U.S. version of the album featured Moby's name on the cover, in addition to "Voodoo Child", and was released by Elektra on July 29, 1997, over a year after its international release. This version's length is 66:19, about 13 minutes longer than its original release. This was mainly due to a differing track listing, including the addition of "Reject" (a track that originally appeared on Little Idiot), a slightly extended version of "Honest Love", an ambient version of "Dog Heaven", and the removal of "Animal Sight".

== Reception ==
Professional ratings
Review scores
Source	Rating
AllMusic	2.5/5 stars
Robert Christgau	(dud)
Cross Rhythms	7/10
NME	7/10
Pitchfork Media	8.0/10

The End of Everything has been generally well received by critics. Ryan Schreiber of Pitchfork compared the album to Brian Eno, writing: "Oozing through your headphones like mist through headlights, The End of Everything sounds more like music for a spring morning's drive than an apocalyptic vision. And that's a good thing. [...] It's a great thing when an artist digs up his roots, discovers what's down there and creates wholesome goodness from what he's found. The End of Everything is a shining example that, despite his previous hard rock release, this baldheaded Jesus freak hasn't actually gone crackers."

== Track listing ==
UK version

1. "Dog Heaven" – 6:09
2. "Patient Love" – 9:43
3. "Great Lake" – 8:58
4. "Gentle Love" – 8:17
5. "Honest Love" – 6:07
6. "Slow Motion Suicide" – 7:08
7. "Animal Sight" – 7:18

US version

1. "Patient Love" – 9:51
2. "Great Lake" – 8:58
3. "Gentle Love" – 8:17
4. "Honest Love" – 7:27
5. "Slow Motion Suicide" – 7:07
6. "Dog Heaven" – 6:03
7. "Reject" – 18:27
