= Future Quiet =

Studio album by Moby
- Released: February 20, 2026
- Genre: Ambient
- Length: 85:07
- Label: BMG
- Producer: Moby

Moby chronology
Always Centered at Night (2024)	Future Quiet (2026)

Singles from Future Quiet
- 1. "When It's Cold, I'd Like to Die" Released: January 21, 2026

Professional ratings
Aggregate scores
Source	Rating
Metacritic	74/100
Review scores
Source	Rating
AllMusic	3.5/5 stars
Clash	8/10
Far Out	3/5 stars
Hot Press	7.5/10
musicOMH	4/5 stars
Record Collector	3/5 stars
The Scotsman	3/5 stars
Spill Magazine	5/5 stars
Sputnikmusic	3.5/5
Uncut	7/10

Future Quiet is the twenty-third studio album by American musician Moby, released on February 20, 2026, through BMG.

== Track listing ==
Future Quiet track listing
No.	Title	Length
1.	"When It's Cold I'd Like to Die" (featuring Jacob Lusk)	4:16
2.	"This Was Never Meant for Us"	5:00
3.	"Retreat"	6:44
4.	"Estrella del Mar" (featuring Elise Serenelle)	6:41
5.	"Ruhe"	5:07
6.	"Mott St. 1992"	5:48
7.	"Precious Mind (Quiet Future)" (featuring India Carney)	5:39
8.	"Tallinn"	6:33
9.	"On Air (Quiet Future)" (featuring Serpentwithfeet)	4:49
10.	"Selene"	5:32
11.	"Le Vide"	6:06
12.	"Great Absence"	8:33
13.	"Mono No Aware"	5:51
14.	"The Opposite of Fear"	8:28
Total length:		85:07

== Charts ==
Chart performance for Future Quiet
Chart (2026)	Peak position
Belgian Albums (Ultratop Flanders)	98
Belgian Albums (Ultratop Wallonia)	63
Croatian International Albums (HDU)	11
French Physical Albums (SNEP)	50
German Albums (Offizielle Top 100)	63
Scottish Albums (Official Charts)	33
Swiss Albums (Schweizer Hitparade)	33
UK Albums Sales (OCC)	30
UK Independent Albums (Official Charts)	11
