= Area Festival =

Former North American music festival

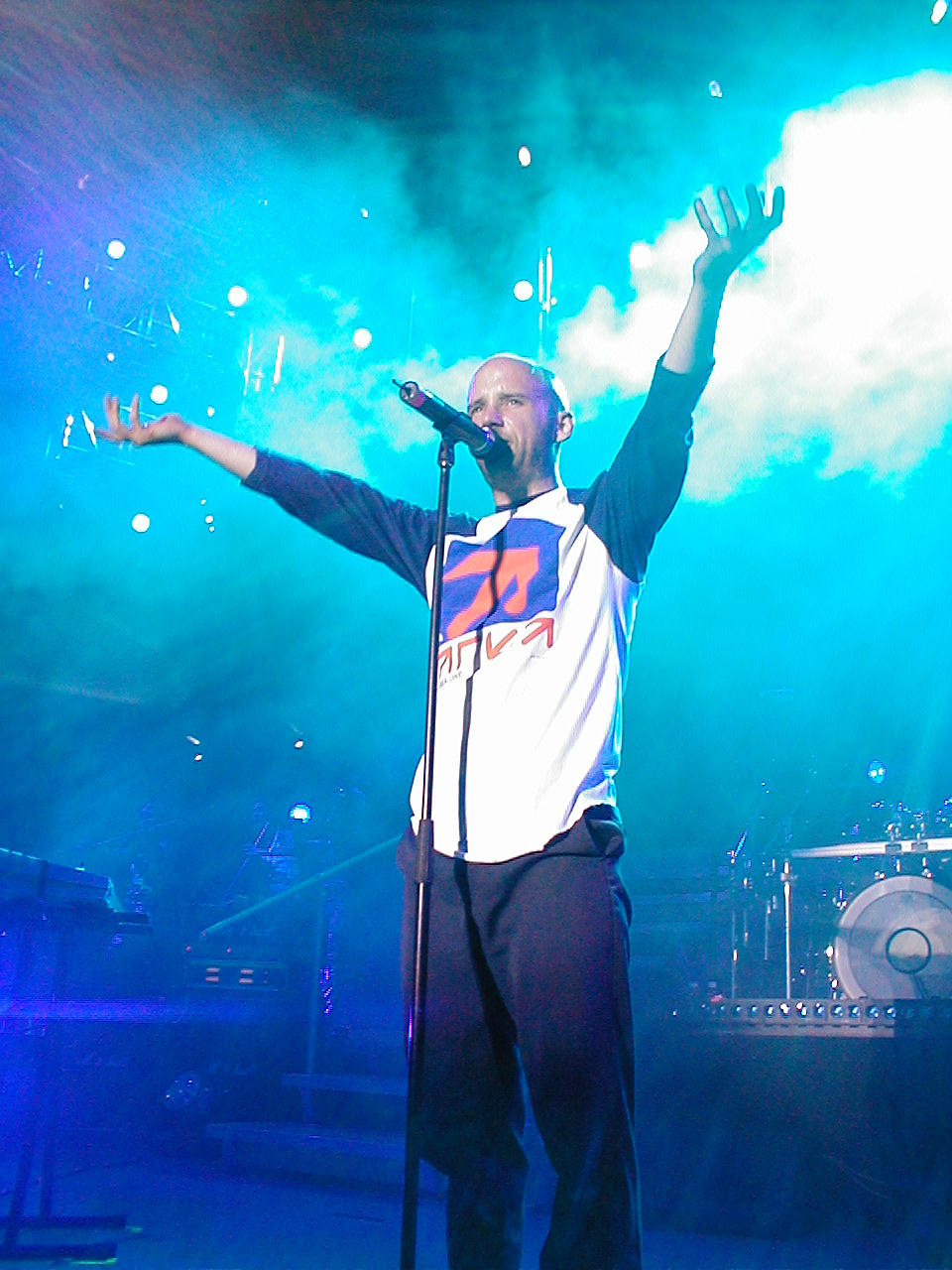
- Genre: Electronic; rock; hip hop
- Dates: July–August
- Location: North America (touring)
- Years active: 2001–2002

The Area Festival was a music festival founded by popular electronic musician Moby, who asserted that he was "in large part, inspired by the ethos of Lollapalooza", and wished to create a similarly "genuinely eclectic, interesting, alternative music festival". Moby organized the first such festival, called Area:One in 2001, and the sequel tour Area2, in 2002. The festival is currently on indefinite hiatus. The festival featured diverse genres of music. Besides headliner Moby, the main stage mostly featured rock and pop acts. The second stage was an air-conditioned tent where electronic, dance and smaller bands performed.

== Acts ==
The 2001 Area:One acts included Moby, OutKast, The New Deal, Carl Cox, Nelly Furtado, Incubus, Paul Oakenfold, The Roots, The Orb, New Order, and Rinôçérôse.

The 2002 Area2 acts included Moby and David Bowie in alternating headlining slots: as well as Ash, Blue Man Group, and Busta Rhymes.

The festival also featured a DJ tent with a rotating list of artists.

The main sponsors for the tour were Intel, KMX, and Pepsi.

== Area:One ==
This concert in 2001 featured:

- Moby
- Jurassic 5
- Outkast
- Kelis
- New Order
- Gwen Stefani
- Nelly Furtado
- Incubus
- The Roots
- Paul Oakenfold
- The Orb
- Carl Cox
- Rinôçérôse
- Timo Maas
- Kevin Saunderson
- Derrick May
- Juan Atkins

=== Area:One tour dates ===
Area:One was a three-and-a-half-week touring festival in the Summer of 2001.

Date	City	Country	Venue
July 11, 2001	Atlanta	United States	Hi-Fi Buys Amphitheatre
July 13, 2001	Columbia	United States	Merriweather Post Pavilion
July 14, 2001	Camden	United States	Tweeter Center at the Waterfront
July 15, 2001	Wantagh	United States	Jones Beach
July 16, 2001	Wantagh	United States	Jones Beach
July 18, 2001	Mansfield	United States	Tweeter Center
July 19, 2001	Holmdel	United States	PNC Bank Arts Center
July 21, 2001	Clarkston	United States	DTE Energy Music Center
July 22, 2001	Toronto	Canada	The Docks
July 24, 2001	Clarkston	United States	DTE Energy Music Center
July 25, 2001	Tinley Park	United States	Tweeter Center
July 26, 2001	Saint Paul	United States	Midway Stadium
July 28, 2001	Denver	United States	Mile High Stadium
July 31, 2001	Mountain View	United States	Shoreline Amphitheatre
August 2, 2001	Vancouver	Canada	Thunderbird Stadium
August 3, 2001	George	United States	Gorge Amphitheatre
August 5, 2001	Devore	United States	Glen Helen Blockbuster Pavilion

== Area2 ==
This concert in 2002 featured:

Main Stage

- Moby
- David Bowie
- Billy Talent in Toronto
- Busta Rhymes Rhymes never played in Toronto - he was held up in immigration on the way in.
- Blue Man Group
- Ash

Stage Two:

- Carl Cox
- John Digweed
- Tiësto
- DJ Dan
- The Avalanches
- Dieselboy
- DJ Tim Skinner

=== Area2 tour dates ===
Area was a three-week touring festival in the mid-2002.

Date	City	Country	Venue
July 28, 2002	Washington, D.C.	United States	Nissan Pavilion
July 30, 2002	Camden	United States	Tweeter Center at the Waterfront
July 31, 2002	Holmdel	United States	PNC Bank Arts Center
August 2, 2002	Wantagh	United States	Jones Beach Theatre
August 3, 2002	Mansfield	United States	Tweeter Center Boston
August 5, 2002	Toronto	Canada	Molson Amphitheatre
August 6, 2002	Clarkston	United States	DTE Energy Music Center
August 8, 2002	Tinley Park	United States	Tweeter Center Chicago
August 10, 2002	Denver	United States	Universal Lending Pavilion (former temporary venue located within the Ball Arena parking lot)
August 13, 2002	Irvine	United States	Verizon Wireless Amphitheater-Irvine
August 14, 2002	Mountain View	United States	Shoreline Amphitheatre
August 16, 2002	George	United States	The Gorge Amphitheatre Due to illness, DJ John Digweed was unable to attend the final event of the tour. DJ Tim Skinner was also unable to attend.

== See also ==
- List of electronic music festivals
