= Baby Monkey =

Studio album by Voodoo Child
- Released: January 27, 2004
- Recorded: 2002–2003
- Length: 66:17
- Label: V2; Mute
- Producer: Moby

Voodoo Child chronology
The End of Everything (1996)	Baby Monkey (2004)

Singles from Baby Monkey
- 1. "Light Is in Your Eyes"/"Electronic" Released: November 11, 2003; 2. "Take It Home"/"Strings" Released: December 2003

Baby Monkey is the second studio album by Voodoo Child, an alternate pseudonym of American electronica musician Moby. It was released in January 2004 by record labels V2 and Mute.

== Release ==
Baby Monkey was released on January 27, 2004, by record labels V2 and Mute. According to the album's liner notes, Moby released the album under his pseudonym so he could concentrate on the music without having to worry about promotion or record sales.

Two singles were released: "Light Is in Your Eyes" in November 2003 and "Take It Home" in December.

== Reception ==
Professional ratings
Aggregate scores
Source	Rating
Metacritic	58/100
Review scores
Source	Rating
AllMusic	2.5/5 stars
Blender	3/5 stars
Entertainment Weekly	C
The Guardian	3/5 stars
Mojo	3/5 stars
Pitchfork	4.2/10
Q	2/5 stars
Spin	5/10
Uncut	3/5 stars
Urb	3/5 stars

Baby Monkey has received mixed reviews from critics. Mojo wrote: "Baby Monkey has a strangely nostalgic feel – as if he's reanimated his old raver's soul, with its favourite beats and bass lines intact." Uncut called it "An interesting addition to the artist's varied oeuvre." Blender wrote: "As self-indulgent side projects go, this could be a whole lot worse."

On the other hand, AllMusic wrote that it "Often sounds virtually identical to a generic dance record circa 1992." Q wrote: "Baby Monkey has nothing of the danger, adventure or indeed chemical frisson that defined rave culture—it's just smug sonic wallpaper." Spin noted: "These tracks lack the energy to power a glow stick." Jonathan Zwickel of Pitchfork wrote: "There's no life breathing through these 12 flaccid tracks, each of which would've seemed regressive even in Moby's early-90s heyday—today, each is a total anachronism."

== Track listing ==
1. "Gotta Be Loose in Your Mind" – 4:39
2. "Minors" – 4:54
3. "Take It Home" – 5:09
4. "Light Is in Your Eyes" – 6:14
5. "Electronics" – 6:24
6. "Strings" – 6:50
7. "Gone" – 5:14
8. "Unh Yeah" – 4:27
9. "Obscure" – 4:11
10. "Last" – 3:53
11. "Harpie" – 5:24
12. "Synthesisers" – 9:15
