= Porcelain: A Memoir =

2016 book by Moby

- Cover to the hardcover edition
- Author: Moby
- Audio read by: Moby
- Language: English
- Subject: Moby; New York house; veganism; Christianity; animal rights; recreational drug use
- Genre: Memoir
- Set in: 1990s New York City
- Publisher: Penguin Press
- Publication date: 17 May 2016
- Publication place: United States
- Media type: Print (hardcover and paperback); digital; audio
- Pages: 416
- ISBN: 978-1-59420-642-9 (hardcover first edition)
- OCLC: 919858692
- Dewey Decimal: 782.42166092
- Followed by: Then It Fell Apart
- Website: Official website

Porcelain: A Memoir is a 2016 memoir by American house musician Moby. Covering his youth in the 1970s until his worldwide success in the late 1990s with Play, the book also discusses the author's spiritual struggles as a Christian, initial avoidance of and eventual recreational drug use, and interest in animal rights and veganism. The book was met favorably by critics. He had plans for a future volume covering the following decade, which he eventually released in 2019 under the title Then It Fell Apart.

== Plot ==
Chapters are centered around short stories, which Moby modeled after the sort of casual conversations that he would have at a bar, intending each one to end with a defined punch line. The book opens in 1976 with the author as a youth living with his mother in Darien and Stratford, Connecticut. After discussing some of his foundational memories of popular music, including Led Zeppelin and disco, the book jumps ahead to 1989, after he has been living in an abandoned factory for two years. He eventually ends up doing regular gigs DJing at New York house clubs such as Limelight and Mars and begins recording his first songs as Voodoo Child. The book follows his personal relationships and recording career as he tours internationally in the mid 1990s and eventually becomes famous with the release of Play in 1999.

== Reception ==
The book has received positive reviews from critics and authors. Rock critic Greg Kot of the Chicago Tribune called the book "exceptional and incisive". The New York Journal of Books review by Paul LaRosa calls Moby a "shrewd, thoughtful, and insightful" author and ends, "This memoir has plenty of charm and if you grew up in the ’90s, this one’s for you. If not, well, it’s not THAT charming."

== Music from Porcelain ==
Music from Porcelain

Mixtape by Moby and various artists
- Released: 17 May 2016
- Recorded: Various
- Studio: Various
- Genres: Electronica; rave; alternative rock
- Languages: English; instrumental
- Labels: Little Idiot; Because Music
- Producer: Various
- Compiler: Moby

Moby chronology
Long Ambients 1: Calm. Sleep. (2016)	Music from Porcelain (2016)	These Systems Are Failing (2016)

To coincide with the release of the book, Moby assembled a compilation of songs he recorded during the period the book covers as well as a mixtape of others' music.

=== Track listing ===
Moby music

1. "Mobility"
2. "Go!" (woodtick mix)
3. "Ah Ah"
4. "Next Is the E"
5. "Rock the House"
6. "Thousand"
7. "Feeling So Real"
8. "God Moving Over the Face of the Waters"
9. "Come On Baby"
10. "That's When I Reach for My Revolver"
11. "Honey"
12. "Natural Blues"
13. "Bodyrock"
14. "Why Does My Heart Feel So Bad?"
15. "Porcelain"

More music

1. Raze – "Break 4 Love"
2. 808 State – "Pacific State"
3. A Tribe Called Quest – "Scenario"
4. Precious – "Definition of a Track"
5. Jungle Brothers – "I’ll House You"
6. Audio Two – "Top Billin'"
7. Aly-Us – "Follow Me"
8. Big Daddy Kane – "Raw"
9. Darryl McDaniels – "Pause"
10. Joey Beltram – "Energy Flash"
11. T.99 – "Anasthesia" (Out of History mix)
12. Dream Frequency – "Feel So Real"
13. Jaydee – "Plastic Dreams"
14. Strafe – "Set It Off"
