= Resound NYC =

Studio album by Moby
- Released: May 12, 2023
- Recorded: 2023
- Length: 78:34
- Label: Deutsche Grammophon
- Producer: Moby

Moby chronology
| Ambient 2023 (2023) | Resound NYC (2023) | Always Centered at Night (2024) |

Professional ratings
Review scores
| Source | Rating |
|---|---|
| AllMusic | 4/5 stars |
| Clash | 7/10 |
| laut.de | 3/5 stars |

Resound NYC is the twenty-first studio album by American musician Moby, released on May 12, 2023, by Deutsche Grammophon. It features orchestral arrangements of songs that were recorded in New York City between 1994 and 2013, where Moby was born and lived.

The album is a collaboration with various guest vocalists. It contains reworks of Moby songs and an additional cover song of Neil Young's "Helpless".

== Track listing ==
All tracks are written by Moby, except where noted.

Resound NYC track listing
| No. | Title | Writer(s) | Original versions on: | Length |
|---|---|---|---|---|
| 1. | "In My Heart" (featuring Gregory Porter) | | 18 (2002) | 4:56 |
| 2. | "Extreme Ways" (featuring Dougy Mandagi) | | 18 | 4:46 |
| 3. | "South Side" (featuring Ricky Wilson) | | Play (1999) | 4:47 |
| 4. | "Flower (Find My Baby)" (featuring Amythyst Kiah) | Moby, Alan Lomax, Joe Lee & Mattie Gardner | B-side from the Play era, and Play | 4:39 |
| 5. | "In This World" (featuring Nicole Scherzinger and Marisha Wallace) | | 18 | 4:33 |
| 6. | "Helpless" (featuring Margo Timmins and Damien Jurado) | Neil Young | Déjà Vu (1970) by Crosby, Stills, Nash & Young | 6:34 |
| 7. | "Signs of Love" | | 18 | 5:54 |
| 8. | "The Perfect Life" (featuring Ricky Wilson) | | Innocents (2013) | 5:12 |
| 9. | "When It's Cold I'd Like to Die" (featuring P.T. Banks) | Mimi Goese & Moby | Everything Is Wrong (1995) | 5:11 |
| 10. | "Slipping Away" | | Hotel (2005) | 3:50 |
| 11. | "Second Cool Hive" (featuring Oum and Sarah Willis) | Oum & Moby | Remake of "First Cool Hive", from Everything Is Wrong | 4:28 |
| 12. | "Hyenas" (featuring Mylène Farmer) | | Last Night (2008) | 6:07 |
| 13. | "Last Night" | Moby & Sylvia Gordon | Last Night | 6:14 |
| 14. | "Run On" (featuring Danielle Ponder and Elijah Ponder) | | Play | 5:38 |
| 15. | "Walk with Me" (featuring Lady Blackbird) | | Wait for Me (2009) | 5:45 |
| Total length: | | | | 78:34 |

Notes

- All tracks are noted as "Resound NYC Version".

== Charts ==
Chart performance for Resound NYC
| Chart (2023) | Peak position |
|---|---|
| Austrian Albums (Ö3 Austria) | 17 |
| Belgian Albums (Ultratop Flanders) | 39 |
| Belgian Albums (Ultratop Wallonia) | 28 |
| German Albums (Offizielle Top 100) | 11 |
| French Albums (SNEP) | 53 |
| Scottish Albums (Official Charts) | 13 |
| Swiss Albums (Schweizer Hitparade) | 8 |
| UK Album Downloads (Official Charts) | 40 |
