= Moby =

American musician (born 1965)

- Moby at the 2026 Montreux Jazz Festival

Background information
- Born: Richard Melville Hall; September 11, 1965 (age 61); New York City, U.S.
- Genres: Electronica; trip hop; downtempo; ambient; alternative rock; techno
- Occupations: Musician; producer; activist
- Instruments: Vocals; guitar; bass; keyboards; drums; turntables
- Years active: 1983–present
- Labels: Instinct; Elektra; Mute; Little Idiot/Fontana; V2/BMG; Virgin/EMI; Because; Deutsche Grammophon/Universal Classics
- Website: moby.com

Richard Melville Hall (born September 11, 1965), known professionally as Moby, is an American musician, songwriter and animal rights activist. He has sold 20 million records worldwide. AllMusic considers him to be "among the most important dance music figures of the early 1990s, helping bring dance music to a mainstream audience both in the United States and the United Kingdom".

After taking up guitar and piano at the age of nine, he played in several underground punk rock bands through the 1980s (Vatican Commandos, Flipper, Ultra Vivid Scene) before turning to electronic dance music. In 1989, he moved to New York City and became a prolific figure as a DJ, producer, and remixer. His 1991 single "Go" was his mainstream breakthrough, especially in Europe, where it peaked within the top ten of the charts in the Netherlands and the United Kingdom. Between 1992 and 1997 he scored eight top ten hits on the Billboard Dance Club Songs chart including "Move (You Make Me Feel So Good)", "Feeling So Real", and "James Bond Theme (Moby Re-Version)". Throughout the decade he also produced music under various pseudonyms, released the critically acclaimed Everything Is Wrong (1995). His punk-oriented album Animal Rights (1996) alienated much of his fan base.

Moby found commercial and critical success with his fifth album Play (1999), which, after receiving little recognition, became an unexpected global hit in 2000. It remains his highest selling album with 12 million copies sold. Its seventh single, "South Side", featuring Gwen Stefani, appeared on the US Billboard Hot 100, reaching No. 14. Moby followed Play with albums of varied styles including electronic, dance, rock, and downtempo music, starting with 18 (2002), Hotel (2005), and Last Night (2008) and continuing with Wait for Me (2009), Destroyed (2011), and Innocents (2013). Returning to his musical roots, he then released two punk rock inspired albums with The Void Pacific Choir, 2016’s These Systems Are Failing and 2017’s More Fast Songs About the Apocalypse followed by the more melodic Everything Was Beautiful, and Nothing Hurt (2018) and All Visible Objects (2020).

After a performance with the Los Angeles Philharmonic Orchestra in 2018, Moby was approached by a representative from Deutsche Grammophon and was offered the chance to record an orchestral album for the label. The result, 2021’s Reprise, saw him revisit his vast catalogue and rework some of his most well known tracks with new vocalists. Recorded with The Budapest Art Orchestra, the album was his highest-charting in over a decade, hitting the charts in 16 countries. The follow up album, Resound NYC (2023), featured more reworked tracks and more new vocalists.

Interspersed between these later albums were Moby’s explorations of ambient music, including the almost four-hour release Long Ambients 1: Calm. Sleep. (2016), Long Ambients 2 (2019), Live Ambients – Improvised Recordings Vol. 1 (2020), and Ambient 23 (2023), as well as the collaborative Always Centered at Night (2024). Moby continues to record and release albums.

In addition to his music career, Moby is known for his veganism and support for animal rights and humanitarian aid. In 2020 he founded Little Walnut Productions to support creative activism across film, TV, and theater projects. He is the author of four books, including a collection of his photography and two memoirs: Porcelain: A Memoir (2016) and Then It Fell Apart (2019).

== Early life and influences ==
Richard Melville Hall was born September 11, 1965, in the neighborhood of Harlem in Manhattan, New York City. He is the son of Elizabeth McBride (née Warner), a medical secretary, and James Frederick Hall (1941–1967), a chemistry professor, who died in a car crash while drunk when Moby was two. His father gave him the nickname 'Moby' three days after his birth as his parents considered Richard large for a newborn baby. The name was also a reference to the ancestry Hall says he was told by his family, though he is not directly related to Herman Melville, author of Moby-Dick.

Moby was raised by his mother, first in San Francisco from 1969 for a short period. He recalled being sexually abused by a staff member at his daycare during this time. This was followed by a move to Darien, Connecticut, living in a squat with "three or four other drug-addicted hippies, with bands playing in the basement." The two then moved to Stratford, Connecticut, for a brief time. His mother struggled to support her son, often relying on food stamps and government welfare. They occasionally stayed with Moby's grandparents in Darien, but the affluence of the New York City suburb made him feel poor and ashamed. Shortly before his mother's death in 1997, Moby learned from her that he has a half brother. His first job was a caddy at a golf course when he was 13.

Moby took up music at the age of nine. He started on classical guitar and received piano lessons from his mother before studying jazz, music theory, and percussion. In 1983, he became the guitarist in a hardcore punk band, the Vatican Commandos, playing on their debut EP Hit Squad for God. Around this time he was the lead vocalist for Flipper for two days; Moby played bass for their reunion shows in the 2000s. Moby formed a post-punk group named AWOL around the time of his eighteenth birthday. He is credited on their only release, a self-titled EP, as Moby Hall.

In 1983, Moby graduated from Darien High School and started a philosophy degree at the University of Connecticut in Storrs, Connecticut. Around this time he had found the instruments he had learned "sonically limiting" and moved to electronic music. He spun records at the campus radio station WHUS, which led to DJ work in local clubs and bars. Moby grew increasingly unhappy at university, however, and transferred to State University of New York at Purchase, studying philosophy and photography, to try and renew his interest in studying. He dropped out in April 1984 to pursue DJing and music full-time, which started his interest in electronic dance music. For two years he lived in a guest house in Greenwich, Connecticut, where he DJ'd at The Cafe, an under-21 nightclub at the back of a church. In 1987, he started to send demos of his music to record labels in New York City; he failed to receive an offer, which led to a two-year period of "very fruitless labor". He then moved into a semi-abandoned factory in Stamford, Connecticut, that had no bathroom or running water, but the free electricity supply allowed him to work on his music, using a 4-track recorder, synthesizer, and drum machine.

Moby cites the English band Orchestral Manoeuvres in the Dark (OMD) as "heroes", without whom he would never have begun making electronic music. His other formative influences include Nick Drake, Suicide, Silver Apples, Eric B. & Rakim, and Public Enemy.

== Career ==
=== 1989–1993: Signing with Instinct, "Go", and breakthrough ===
In 1989, Moby relocated to New York City with his close friend, artist Damian Loeb. In addition to performing DJ sets in local bars and clubs, he played guitar in alternative rock group Ultra Vivid Scene and appeared in the video for their 1989 single "Mercy Seat". In 1990, Moby joined industrial noise group Shopwell and played on their album Peanuts. Moby's first live electronic music gig followed in the summer of 1990 at Club MK; he wore a suit for the show. His future manager Eric Härle, who was in attendance, recalled Moby's set: "The music was amazing, but the show was riddled with technical mishaps. It left me very intrigued and impressed in a strange way."

By mid-1990, Moby had signed a deal as the sole artist of Instinct Records, an independent New York City-based dance label then still in its infancy. The three-man operation saw Moby answer incoming calls, clean the kitchen, send faxes, and make records in a studio he set up in the owner's lounge. To appear that Instinct had more artists, Moby's early singles were put out under several names such as Voodoo Child, Barracuda, Brainstorm, and UHF. The first, "Time's Up" as The Brotherhood, was co-written by Moby and vocalist Jimmy Mack. This was followed by "Mobility", his first single released as Moby, in November 1990, which sold an initial 2,000 copies. He then scored a breakthrough hit with a remix of "Go", originally a B-side to "Mobility" with an added sample of "Laura Palmer's Theme" by Angelo Badalamenti from the television series Twin Peaks. Released in March 1991, it peaked at No. 10 in the UK in October and earned him national exposure there with an appearance on Top of the Pops. Instinct capitalised on Moby's success with the late 1991 compilation Instinct Dance featuring tracks by Moby and his pseudonyms. The following year, Moby revealed that "Go" had earned him just $2,000 in royalties.

The success of "Go" led to increased demand for Moby to produce more music and to remix other artists' songs. He often arranged for the artist and himself to trade remixes as opposed to being paid for his work, which was the case for his mixes for Billy Corgan and Soundgarden. The increased mainstream exposure led Moby to request a release from his contract with Instinct for a bigger label. Instinct refused, so Moby retaliated by holding out on new material. However, Instinct continued to put out records, mostly from demos, without his consent having previously copied many of his tapes and had the master rights. This was the case for Moby's debut album, Moby, released in July 1992 and formed mostly of previously unreleased demos that Moby considered old and unrepresentative of the musical direction he had taken since. Nonetheless, he claimed Instinct had insisted and had the legal right to put it out. It was re-titled The Story So Far and presented with a different track listing for its UK release. Four singles were released: "Go", "Drop a Beat", "Next Is the E", and a double A-side of "I Feel It" with "Thousand". The latter was recognised by Guinness World Records as the fastest tempo in a recorded song at 1,015 beats-per-minute.

In 1992, Moby completed his first US tour as the opening act for the Shamen. In mid-1992, Moby estimated that he had earned between $8,000 to $11,000 a year for the past six years. At the 1992 Mixmag awards, he smashed his keyboard after his set. After his second nationwide tour, this time with the Prodigy and Richie Hawtin, in early 1993, a second compilation of Moby's work for Instinct followed named Early Underground. His second and final album on Instinct, Ambient, was released in August 1993. It is a collection of mostly ambient techno instrumentals of a more experimental style. By this time Instinct had agreed to release Moby who then took legal action, claiming that the label demanded "a ridiculous amount of money" that he did not have to leave. He also expressed disagreements over the way Instinct had packaged and handled his music. Moby was eventually released after he paid the label $10,000.

=== 1993–1998: Signing with Elektra, Everything Is Wrong, and Animal Rights ===
In 1993, Moby signed with Elektra Records, which lasted for five years. He secured a deal with Mute Records, a British label, to handle his European distribution. Moby's output for Elektra/Mute began with Move, a four-track EP released in August 1993. He attempted to make it in a professional studio, but he disliked the results and re-recorded it at home. The song "All That I Need Is to Be Loved (MV)" is his first song to feature his own vocals. The first single, "Move (You Make Me Feel So Good)", reached No. 1 on the US Billboard Hot Dance Music/Club Play chart and No. 21 in the UK. In 1993, Moby toured as the headlining act with Orbital and Aphex Twin. A rift developed between Aphex Twin and himself, partly due to Moby's refusal to tolerate their cigarette smoke, so he travelled to each gig by plane, leaving the rest on the tour bus. In 1994, Moby put out Demons/Horses, an electronic album of two 20-minute tracks under the name Voodoo Child.

Moby's contract with Elektra allowed the opportunity to make his third full-length album, which was underway in 1994. He chose to include a variety of musical styles on the album that he either liked or had been influenced by, including electronic dance, ambient, rock, and industrial music. Everything Is Wrong was released in March 1995 to critical praise; Spin magazine named it Album of the Year and some commentators considered it to be an album ahead of its time as it failed to crack the Billboard 200 or have an impact on the dance charts. In the UK, the album reached No. 25 and the singles "Hymn" and "Feeling So Real" went to Nos. 31 and 30, respectively. Elektra took advantage of its diverse sound by distributing tracks of the same style to corresponding radio stations nationwide. Early copies put out in the UK and Germany included a bonus CD of ambient music entitled Underwater. Moby toured the album with some headline spots on the second stage at the 1995 Lollapalooza festival. He followed it with a double remix album, Everything Is Wrong—Mixed and Remixed.

The success of Everything Is Wrong had Moby reach a new peak in critical acclaim. The Los Angeles Times thought the 29-year-old Moby was "poised for greatness [...] to make that big crossover" from a respected underground artist to a mainstream dance and rock musician. Billboard declared him "King of techno" and Spin named him "the closest techno comes to a complete artist." In 1995, Moby was approached by Courtney Love to produce the next Hole album, but he declined. He directed the music video for "Young Man's Stride" by Mercury Rev. In 1995 and 1996, Moby put out a number of "self-indulgent dance" singles under the pseudonyms Lopez and DJ Cake on Trophy Records, his own Mute imprint, so he could release material that he was interested in without concern for its commercial impact. In 1996, Moby contributed "Republican Party" to the AIDS benefit album Offbeat: A Red Hot Soundtrip produced by the Red Hot Organization and released his second Voodoo Child album, The End of Everything.

While touring Everything Is Wrong, Moby was interested in broadening his musical horizons. This marked a major stylistic change for his next album, Animal Rights, combining guitar-driven rock songs with Moby on lead vocals and softer ambient tracks. Upon completing the album Moby said that it was "weird, long, self-indulgent and difficult". Its lead single is a cover version of "That's When I Reach for My Revolver" by post-punk group Mission of Burma. Animal Rights was released in September 1996 in the UK, where it peaked at No. 38, and in February 1997 in the US. It was poorly received by his dance fan base who felt Moby had abandoned them, creating doubts as to what kind of artist Moby really was. Moby pointed out that he had not abandoned his electronic music completely and had worked on dance and house mixes and film scores while making Animal Rights.

After Animal Rights, Moby's manager recalled: "We found ourselves struggling for even the slightest bit of recognition. He became a has-been in the eyes of a lot of people in the industry". Despite the hit in sales and critical response, Moby promoted the album with a European tour with Red Hot Chili Peppers and Soundgarden, and headlined the Big Top tour with other dance and electronic DJs. He returned to the genre after liking the house music that a friend and DJ had played at a party. In October 1997, Moby displayed his range of music styles with the release of I Like to Score, a compilation of his film soundtrack work with some re-recorded tracks. Among them are updated version of the "James Bond Theme" used for Tomorrow Never Dies, music used in Scream, and a cover of "New Dawn Fades" by Joy Division, an instrumental version of which appeared in Heat. Late 1997 saw Moby start his first US tour in two years.

In 1998, Elektra granted Moby's request to be released from his deal on the condition that he paid to leave, which amounted to "quite a lot". He felt Elektra did little to capitalise on the critical success of Everything Is Wrong, and that it was only interested in radio friendly hits. Left without an American distributor, his only deal remained with the UK-based Mute Records. Moby considered himself an artist that did not belong to a major label as his music did not fit with the genres that they promoted.

=== 1999–2004: Play, worldwide success, and 18 ===
Moby's fifth album, Play, was released by Mute and V2 Records in May 1999. The project originated when a music journalist introduced Moby to the field recordings of Alan Lomax from the compilation album Sounds of the South: A Musical Journey From the Georgia Sea Islands to the Mississippi Delta. Moby took an interest in the songs and formed samples from various tracks which he used to base new tracks of his own. Upon release in May 1999, Play had moderate sales but eventually sold over 10 million copies worldwide. Moby toured worldwide in support of the album, which lasted 22 months. Every track on Play was licensed to various films, advertisements, and television shows, as well as independent films and non-profit groups. The move was criticised and led to some to consider that Moby had become a sellout, but he later maintained that the licenses were granted mostly to independent films and non-profit projects, and agreed to them due to the difficulty of getting his music heard on the radio and television in the past. In 2007, The Washington Post published an article about a mathematical equation dubbed the "Moby quotient" that determined to what degree had a musical artist sold out. It was named in reference to his decision to license music from Play.

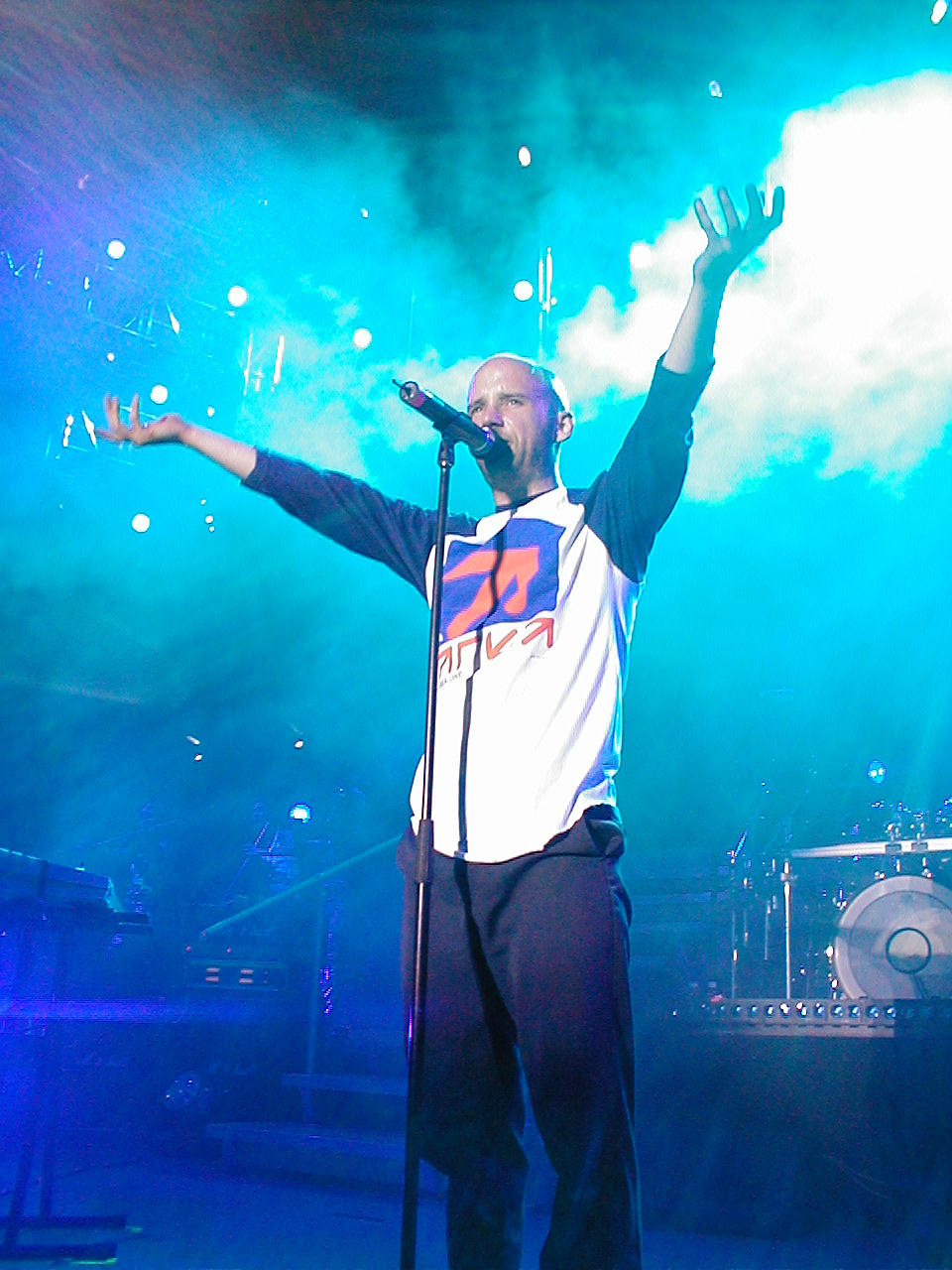
Moby at the inaugural Area:One festival in 2001, which he founded

In 2000, Moby contributed "Flower" to Gone in 60 Seconds. He co-wrote "Is It Any Wonder" with Sophie Ellis-Bextor for her debut solo album, Read My Lips. Moby: Play - The DVD, released in 2001, features the music videos produced for the album, live performances, and other bonus features. It was nominated for a Grammy Award for Best Long Form Music Video. In 2001, Moby founded the Area:One Festival which toured the US and Canada across 17 shows that summer with a range of artists. The set included Outkast, New Order, Incubus, Nelly Furtado, and Paul Oakenfold, with Moby headlining.

Moby started on the follow-up to Play in late 2000. Prior to working on tracks for 18, he got friends to search for records with vocals that he could use and make samples from and went on to write over 140 songs for the album. At the same time, Moby familiarised himself with the ProTools software and made 18 with it. Released in May 2002, 18 went to No. 1 in the UK and eleven other countries, and No. 4 in the US. It went on to sell over four million copies worldwide. Moby toured extensively for both Play and 18, playing over 500 shows in the next four years. The tour included the Area2 Festival in the summer of 2002, featuring a line-up of Moby, David Bowie, Blue Man Group, Busta Rhymes, and Carl Cox. In December 2002, during a tour stop at Paradise Rock Club in Boston, Moby was punched in the face and sprayed with mace by two or three assailants while signing autographs outside the venue. The incident left him with multiple bruises and cuts.

In February 2002, Moby performed at the closing ceremony of the Winter Olympics. That month he hosted the half-hour MTV series Señor Moby's House of Music, presenting a selection of electronic and dance music videos. His song "Extreme Ways" was used in all five of the Bourne films, from 2002 to 2016. Moby said that after it was used for the first, the producers originally sought a different artist for the second but they had too little time to secure someone, leading them to pick "Extreme Ways" for the entire series. In 2002, rapper Eminem mocked Moby in his song "Without Me" and its music video, dressing up like him and calling him a "thirty-six-year-old baldheaded fag" and his techno music outdated. Eminem had also shot a mock figure of Moby on stage. Moby put the attack down to Eminem having "this unrequited crush on me."

In 2003, Moby headlined the Glastonbury Festival on the final day. He co-wrote and produced "Early Mornin'" for Britney Spears' album In the Zone released that year. Moby returned to his dance and rave roots with the release of Baby Monkey, the third album under his Voodoo Child moniker, in 2004. Later that year, he collaborated with Public Enemy on "Make Love Fuck War", a protest song against the Iraq War.

=== 2004–2010: Hotel, Last Night, and Wait for Me ===
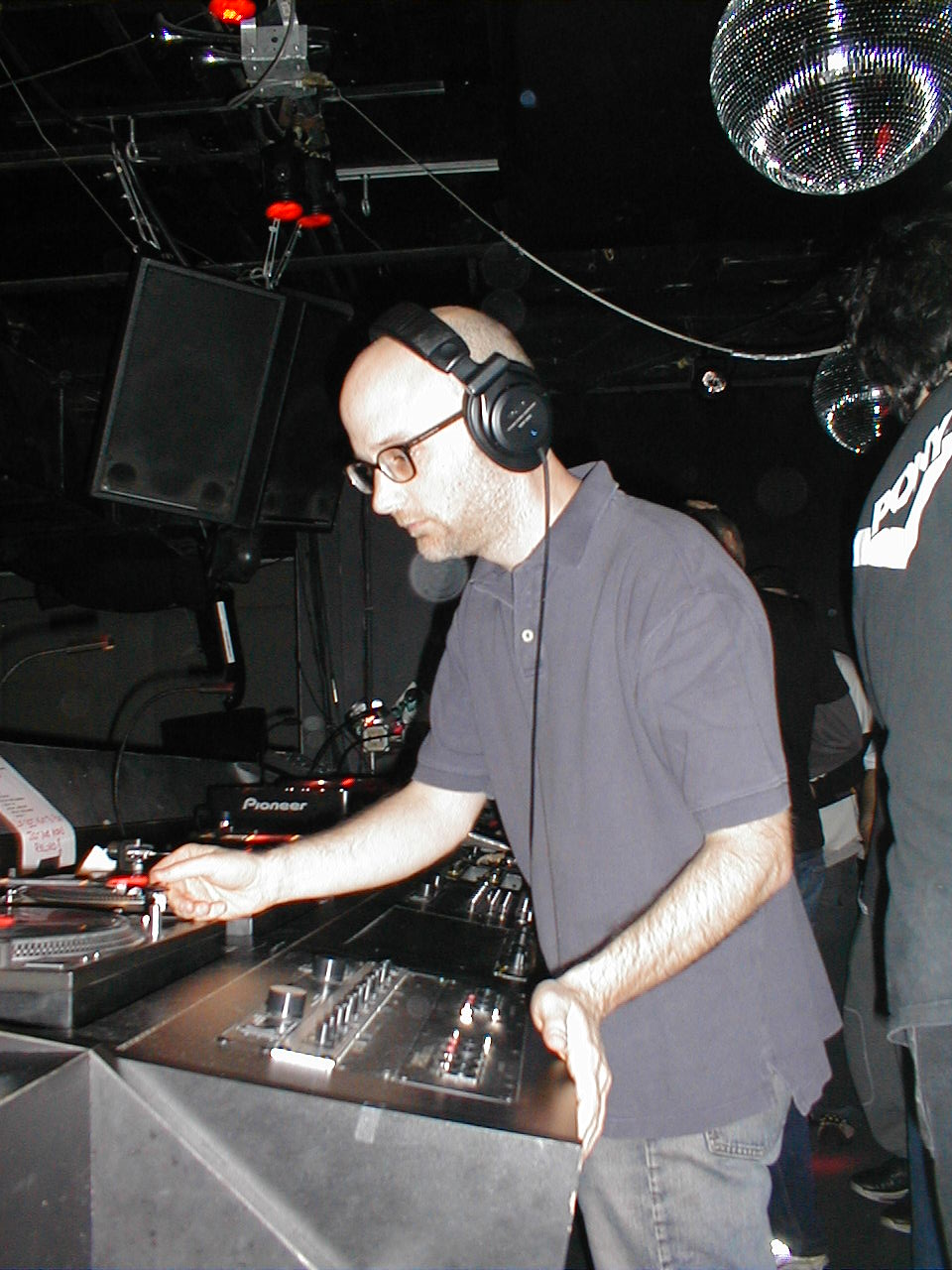
Moby performing a DJ set in 2004

Moby's seventh album, Hotel, was released in March 2005. The album contains little use of samples, which Moby reasoned to using different audio recording software which had a sampling function that was too difficult to learn, "so it was me just being lazy". The instruments were recorded live by Moby except for the drums, for which he enlisted his longtime live drummer Scott Frassetto. The album features vocals from six other performers, including Laura Dawn and Shayna Steele. In 2013, Moby looked back on the album as his least favourite of his career, pointing out that it was the only one not recorded at his home studio. The singles "Lift Me Up" and "Slipping Away" became top-10 hits across Europe. Early copies of the album included a bonus CD of remixes and ambient music entitled Hotel: Ambient that was released on its own in 2014.

In 2007, Moby also started a rock band, The Little Death with his friends Laura Dawn, Daron Murphy, and Aaron A. Brooks. Following the dissolution of V2 Records in 2007, Moby signed a new deal with Mute Records to handle his American distribution. In 2007 Moby produced and performed on a remake of "The Bulrushes" by The Bongos that appeared on the special anniversary edition of the group's debut album Drums Along the Hudson, on Cooking Vinyl Records. From 2007 to 2008 he ran a series of New York City club nights titled "Degenerates".

In 2008, Moby released Last Night, an electronic dance album inspired by a night out in his New York City neighborhood. The album was recorded in Moby's home studio and features various guest vocalists, including Wendy Starland, MC Grandmaster Caz, Sylvia of Kudu, MC Aynzli, and the Nigerian 419 Squad. The singles from Last Night include "Alice" and "Disco Lies".

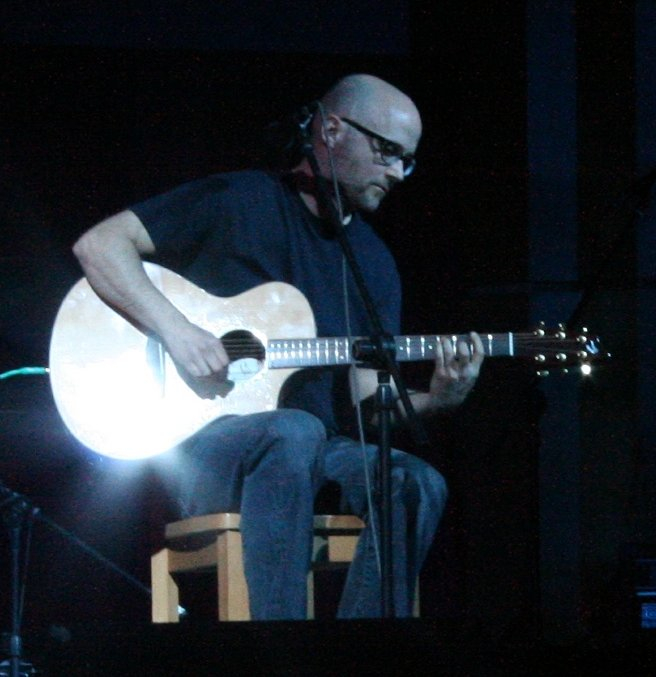
Moby performing at the David Lynch Weekend in 2008

Moby wished for the follow-up to Last Night to be emotional, personal, and melodic. He felt creatively inspired by a David Lynch speech at the BAFTA Award ceremony in the UK which prompted him to write new material that he liked with little regard to its mainstream commercial success. He decided against recording in a professional studio as he wanted to record the entire album at home, and chose to have the album mixed using analogue equipment. Wait for Me was released on June 30, 2009. Moby and Lynch discussed the recording process of Wait for Me on Lynch's online channel, David Lynch Foundation Television Beta. The video to the first single, "Shot in the Back of the Head", offered as a free download, was directed by Lynch.

Moby held a user-generated content competition to have fans create a video for "Wait for Me", the last single from the album, which was to be used as the official video. The winning entry was written and directed by Nimrod Shapira of Israel, and portrays the story of a girl who decides to invite Moby into her life. She attempts to do so by using a book called How to Summon Moby, A Guide for Dummies, putting herself through bizarre and comical steps, each is a tribute to a different Moby video. The single was released in May 2010.

The Wait for Me tour featured a full band. Moby raised over $75,000 from three shows in California to help those affected by domestic violence after funding for the state's domestic violence program had been cut. The tour also saw Moby headline the Falls Festival in Australia and various Sunset Sounds festivals.(nothing, delete the reference only), 4 other citation(s) in the paragraph; confirm one covers this sentence, otherwise add An ambient version Wait for Me was released in late 2009 as Wait for Me: Ambient, which Moby did not produce.

In 2010, Moby enlisted vocalist Phil Costello as a songwriting partner for a new heavy metal band, Diamondsnake. After writing 13 songs, they recruited guitarist Dave Hill and a drummer named Tomato to complete the line-up. They recorded their self-titled debut album in one day and released it for free on their website. It was promoted with a series of gigs in New York City and Los Angeles. Moby contributed four songs to the soundtrack of The Next Three Days, including the single "Mistake".

=== 2010–2015: Destroyed and Innocents ===
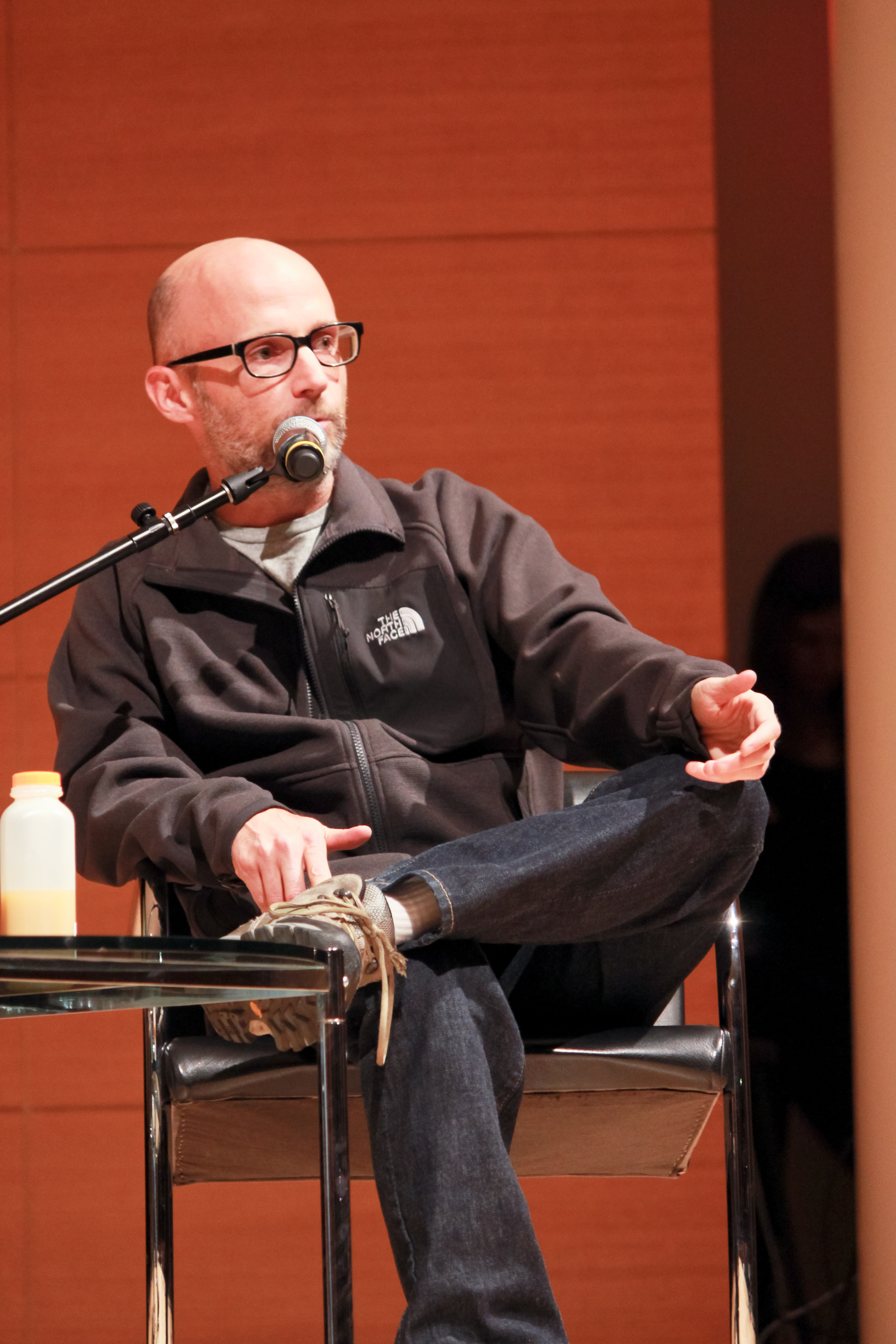
Moby promoting the Destroyed book and album at a performance and discussion in the Brooklyn Museum, 2011

In January 2010, Moby announced that he had started work on a new album. He later summarised its style as: "Broken down melodic electronic music for empty cities at 2 a.m." The album was promoted with an EP containing three tracks from the album, given free to those who had signed up to Moby's mailing list, entitled Be the One, in February 2011. The album, Destroyed, was released in May 2011. A same-titled book of Moby's photography was released around the time of the album. Moby took to an online poll to decide the next single from Destroyed; the fans picked "Lie Down in Darkness". This was followed by "After" and "The Right Thing", both influenced by what fans had picked. A limited edition remixed version of Destroyed was released in 2012 as Destroyed Remixed and includes new remixes by David Lynch, Holy Ghost! and System Divine, and a new 30-minute ambient track named "All Sides Gone".

Moby toured worldwide throughout 2013, completing acoustic and DJ sets at various concerts and festivals. His DJ set at Coachella was produced in collaboration with NASA with various images from space projected onto screens during the performance. On Record Store Day in 2013, Moby released a 7-inch record, The Lonely Night, featuring Screaming Trees vocalist Mark Lanegan. The track was subsequently released as a download with remixes by Moby, Photek, Gregor Tresher, and Freescha.

In October 2013, Moby released Innocents. He had worked on the album for the previous 18 months and hired Spike Stent to produce it. Moby used several guest vocalists on the album, and picked Neil Young and "Broken English" by Marianne Faithfull as the biggest influences to the musical style on the album. As with Destroyed, the photographs used for the artwork were all shot by Moby. The first single from the album was "A Case for Shame", followed by "The Perfect Life", which featured Wayne Coyne. A casting call for its video asked "for obese Speedo-sporting bikers, nude rollerskating ghosts, and an S&M gimp proficient in rhythmic gymnastics". Moby promoted the album with three shows at the Fonda Theatre in Los Angeles, following his decision to undergo little touring from 2014. He wrote: "Pretty much all I want to do in life is stay home and make music. So, thus: a 3 date world tour."

Six of Moby's songs are feature in Charlie Countryman (2013). His music set the tone to Cathedrals of Culture (2014), a 3D documentary film about the soul of buildings, directed by Robert Redford. In December 2014, Moby performed three shows of ambient music at the Masonic Lodge in Hollywood Forever Cemetery to support the release of Hotel: Ambient. The performances were accompanied by visuals created by himself and with David Lynch.

=== 2016–present: Recent albums and documentary ===
After Innocents, Moby proceeded to make a new wave dance album with a choir, but realised the difficulty in recording a full choir in his home studio and resorted to multi-tracking vocals performed by himself and guests. He then decided against the new wave album and opted for one made by himself and seven guest vocalists he named the Void Pacific Choir. These Systems Are Failing was announced in September 2016 and coincided with the first single release, "Are You Lost In The World Like Me?". Its video, by animator Steve Cutts, addresses smartphone addiction which won a Webby Award. These Systems Are Failing was released on October 14, 2016. Moby's sole live performance of 2016 was at Circle V, a vegan food and music festival that he founded that took place on October 23 at the Fonda Theatre in Los Angeles. A second album with the Void Pacific Choir name followed in June 2017, entitled More Fast Songs About the Apocalypse, influenced by the results of the 2016 United States presidential election. Released for free online, it was marketed from a spoof website using elected President Donald Trump's alleged PR alter-ego, John Miller.

Moby performing in 2018

Moby announced his fifteenth studio album, Everything Was Beautiful, and Nothing Hurt, in December 2017. The announcement coincided with the release of the first single, "Like a Motherless Child". In contrast to the politically inspired and punk nature of the two Void Pacific Choir records, the album explores themes of spirituality, individuality, and humanity. The album was released on March 2, 2018. The second single, "Mere Anarchy", was described by Moby as "post apocalypse, people are gone, and my friend Julie and I are time traveling aliens visiting the empty Earth." "This Wild Darkness" was the third single, released in February 2018. Moby described the song as "an existential dialog between me and the gospel choir: me talking about my confusion, the choir answering with longing and hope." Moby promoted the album with three live shows in March 2018 with a full band, one at The Echo in Los Angeles and two at Rough Trade in New York City. All profits from the album and gigs were donated to animal rights organizations.

In 2018, Moby was a guest performer on "A$AP Forever" by American rapper A$AP Rocky which samples "Porcelain". This resulted in Moby's second ever appearance on the US Billboard Hot 100 singles chart, having previously charted for "Southside", 17 years prior. Moby contributed several songs to the comedy Half Magic (2018) directed by Heather Graham.

In March 2019, Moby released a follow-up to his first long ambient album, Long Ambients 2.

In January 2020, Moby announced that his new studio album All Visible Objects will be released on May 15. The first single, "Power is Taken" featuring D. H. Peligro, was released on the same day as the announcement. All profits from the album will be given to charity.

In December 2020, Moby released another ambient album, Live Ambients – Improvised Recordings Vol. 1. It features tracks recorded under three conditions that he set himself: improvise with nothing written beforehand, no editing of the pieces after recording, and that every part of the process was to be "calming". The album was released on digital streaming platforms, followed by videos of Moby performing each track on December 30 on his YouTube channel.

After a performance with the Los Angeles Philharmonic Orchestra in 2018, Moby was approached by a representative from Deutsche Grammophon and was offered the chance to record an orchestral album for the label. The result, 2021’s “Reprise,” saw him revisit his vast catalogue and rework some of his most well known tracks with new vocalists (including Gregory Porter, Mark Lanegan, Kris Kristofferson, Amethyst Kiah and Jim James). Recorded with The Budapest Art Orchestra, the album was his highest-charting in over a decade, hitting the charts in 16 countries. The follow up album “Resound NYC” (2023) featured more reworked tracks and more new vocalists, including Lady Blackbird, Nicole Scherzinger, Ricky Wilson and Margo Timmins.

Moby interviewed in 2021

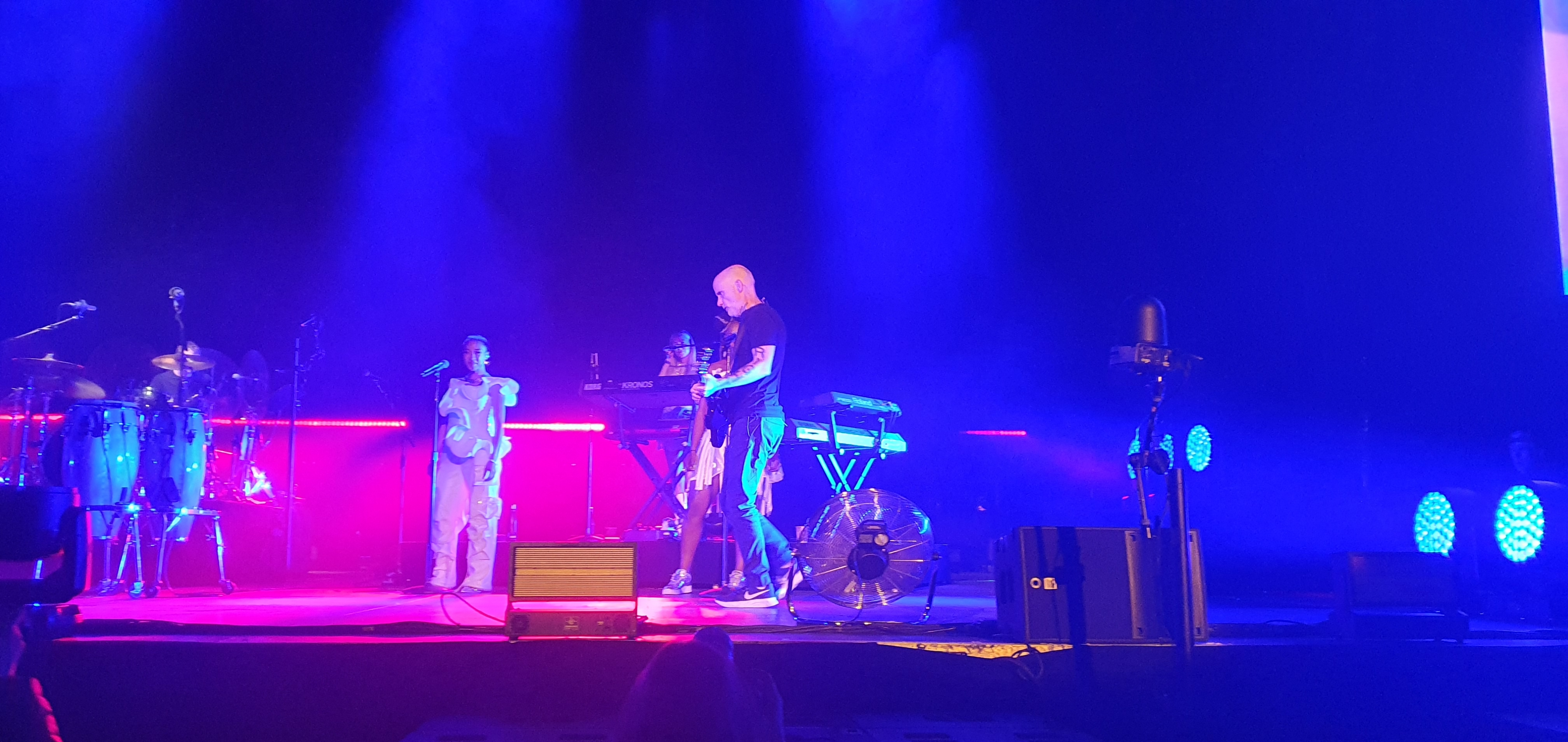
Moby performing at the Millennium Dome on 19th of September 2024

On June 1, 2022, Moby launched his new record label, Always Centered at Night. He established it to sign "emerging and fascinating variety of singers to join with me in making music they might not have been able to make elsewhere." The first single, "Medusa", features Grammy nominated singer Aynzli Jones.

On January 1, 2023, Moby released a two-and-a-half-hour ambient album Ambient 23. It was made almost exclusively with dated drum machines and synthesizers, with his "early ambient heroes" as sources of inspiration, including Brian Eno and Jean-Michel Jarre.

On June 14, 2024, Moby released Always Centered At Night, which charted in several countries across Europe. Featuring vocals from several artists including Brie O'Banion on the first single released on music platforms, "We're Going Wrong", serpentwithfeet, returning to the album Lady Blackbird on the second single "Dark Days", Benjamin Zephaniah on the third single "Where Is Your Pride?", Gaidaa on "Transit", Danae, J.P. Bimeni, Raquel Rodriguez, Aynzli Jones, Akemi Fox, Choklate on the fourth single "Sweet Moon", India Carney on the fifth and final single, "Precious Mind", and Jose James. Moby released the music videos for both "Transit" and "Where is your Pride?" on YouTube in June shortly after the album released. Rolling Stone praised the album and Moby for his "creativity knows no boundaries". Moby later released a complimentary remix album in mid September titled "always centered at night (quiet home: remixes dj mix)".

In September 2024, to celebrate the 25th anniversary of the album Play, he launched his first tour in over a decade, playing to sold-out arenas across Europe. The tour made stops in Manchester, London, Antwerp, Berlin, Düsseldorf, Paris and Lausanne. Moby stated that the main reason for the tour was not only to commemorate the anniversary of Play, but also to raise money for local animal rights organizations in all of the countries where he toured by donating all of his proceeds from the shows to the charities.

Throughout 2024, he also collaborated with numerous artists on additional tracks, including Armin Van Buuren, Anfisa Letyago, Chris Stussy, Miss Monique, FAST BOY, Nicolas Julien and Blastoyz.

In April 2025, Moby relaunched his MobyGratis website which allows independent filmmakers and artists free access to some of Moby’s music. In addition to the music being used for independent films, the new version of the website allows artists and creators the ability to download multi-tracks and make new music. Originally started in 2007, the new relaunch will feature an additional 500 new tracks, with more tracks to be added in the future.

More collaborations followed in 2025, including a new version of “Natural Blues” with BLOND:ISH and Kiko Franco, “Stereo” with Goddard and Lovelle, “Lagrange Point” with Øneheart, “E After Next” with Avalon Emerson and “Lift Me Up” with Silver Panda.”

=== Collaborations ===
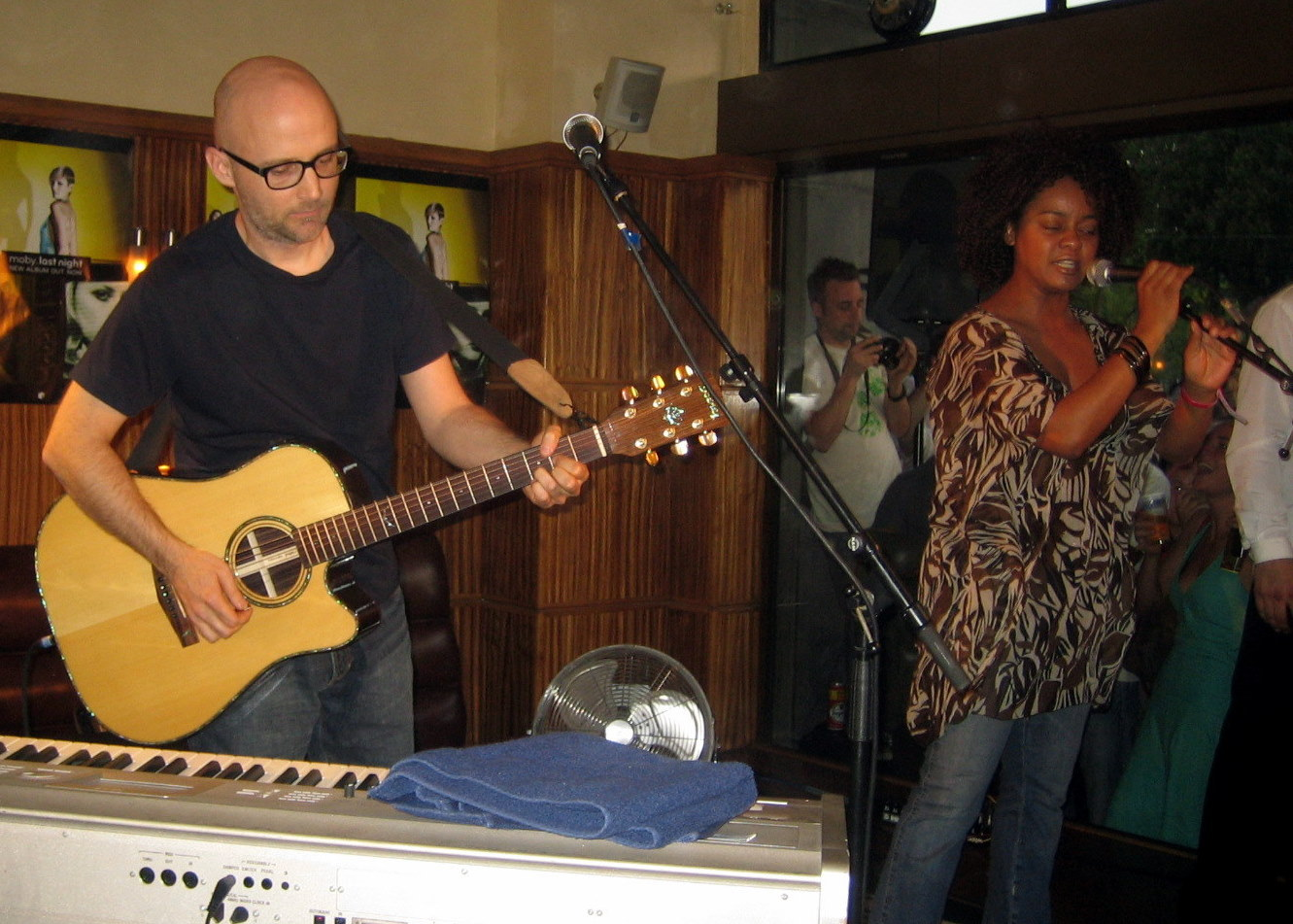
Moby playing guitar with Joy Malcolm in 2008

Moby has collaborated live with many of his heroes while on tour or at fundraisers. He has performed "Walk on the Wild Side" with Lou Reed, "Me and Bobby McGee" with Kris Kristofferson, "Heroes" and "Cactus" with David Bowie, "Helpless" with Bono and Michael Stipe, "New Dawn Fades" with New Order, "Make Love, Fuck War" with Public Enemy, "Whole Lotta Love" with Slash, and "That's When I Reach For My Revolver" with Mission of Burma.

Throughout his career, he has released a number of remixes of iconic tracks including Beastie Boys' “Alive”, Aerosmith's “Falling in Love”, Brain Eno's “Fractal Zoom”, Blur's “Beetlebum”, Daft Punk's “The Son of Flynn”, Erasure's “Chorus”, Metallica's “Until it Sleeps”, Michael Jackson's “Beat It” and “Who Is It?”, Orchestral Manoeuvres in the Dark's “Souvenir”, The Rolling Stone's “I’m Free”, and Ultravox's “Lament”.

He has performed two duets with the French singer Mylène Farmer ("Slipping Away (Crier la vie)" in 2006 and "Looking for My Name" in 2008) and produced seven songs on her eighth album, Bleu Noir, released on December 6, 2010 and two songs on her twelfth album L'Emprise, released on November 25, 2022 . She also sang the vocals to the rework of the song "Hyenas" present on the Resound NYC album.

In 1992 he contributed vocals to song "Curse" on Recoil's "Bloodline" (Alan Wilder's solo project, he was a Depeche Mode member at time of that recording). Moby arguably later used this inspiration for his breakthrough 1999 album, Play, for which he used several old field recordings by Alan Lomax, much as Wilder had used a 1937 recording of Bukka White's "Shake 'Em On Down".

On October 16, 2015, Jean Michel Jarre released his compilation album Electronica 1: The Time Machine, which included the track "Suns have gone" co-produced by Jarre and Moby.

On September 24, 2016, Moby announced the release of an album titled These Systems Are Failing, released under the name Moby & Void Pacific Choir. The followed the release of two singles from Moby & The Void Pacific Choir in 2015, "Almost Loved" & "The Light Is Clear In My Eyes".

=== TV/Film work ===
In 2006, he accepted an offer to score the soundtrack for Richard Kelly's 2007 movie Southland Tales, because he was a fan of Kelly's previous film, Donnie Darko. He has contributed music for number of TV shows over the years including Gossip Girl, The Sopranos, Stranger Things, and True Detective, and films including Heat, Miami Vice, The Bourne Identity franchise, and Tomorrow Never Dies.

Moby has guest starred on several TV shows including No Cover, Urbanation Icons, 30 Rock, Fact Checkers Unit, The Mindy Project, Betas, the Funny or Die spoof NCIS: Ibiza, Meow Madness, Twin Peaks, Animals, and Night Fever. He also acted in the films Joe’s Apartment, Alien Sex Party, Suck and Intruder.

Starz aired a special episode of Blunt Talk, the Patrick Stewart comedy which involved Moby. He had been friends with Jonathan Ames for a long time, and "when we both lived in NY we did a lot of really strange, cabaret, vaudeville type shows together, and we just sort of stayed friends over the years. I guess when he and the other writers were writing Blunt Talk one of them thought it would be funny to include me as Patrick Stewart's character's ex-wife's current boyfriend."

Moby was one of the first musicians to have an episode on Netflix's new music documentary series titled Once In a Lifetime Sessions; where he records, discusses, and performs his music. He has also performed on major television shows like Saturday Night Live, The Tonight Show, The Late Show with David Letterman, Late Night with Conan O'Brien, The Late Show with Stephen Colbert, Good Morning America, and Live with Jools Holland.

=== Podcast host ===
Moby hosts a podcast called Moby Pod with co-hosts Lindsay Hicks and Bagel.

== Business ventures ==
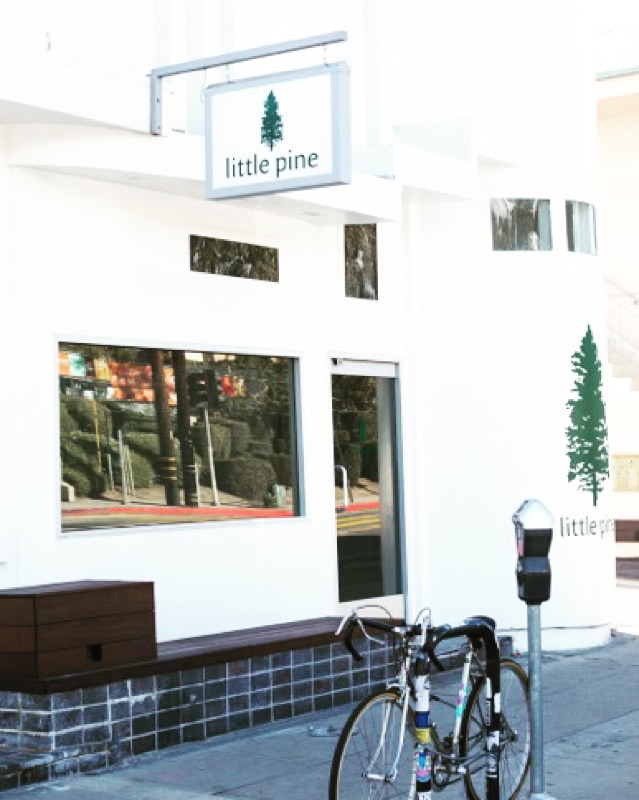
Moby's vegan restaurant, Little Pine, in Los Angeles

Starting around 2001, Moby launched a series of co-owned business ventures, with the two most prominent being the Little Idiot Collective—a New York City bricks-and-mortar clothing store, comics store, and animation studio that sold the work of an "illustrators collective". In May 2002, he launched a small raw and vegan restaurant and tea shop called TeaNY in New York City with his then-girlfriend, Kelly Tisdale. In 2006, Moby said he had removed himself from any previous business projects.

In November 2015, Moby opened the vegan restaurant Little Pine in the Silver Lake neighborhood of Los Angeles. The restaurant served organic, vegan, Mediterranean-inspired dishes and had a retail section with art and books, curated by Moby himself. All profits were donated to animal welfare organizations. In May 2016, Moby estimated the year's donations at $250,000. In December 2019, Moby launched the Little Pine lifestyle range of products and merchandise, with all profits donated to six charities. Little Pine closed permanently in December 2022.

On August 23, 2016, Moby announced the inaugural Circle V Festival along with the official video for "Don't Leave Me", by Moby & the Void Pacific Choir. The event took place at LA's Fonda Theatre and featured Blaqk Audio & Cold Cave on the bill, amongs others, as well as talks and vegan food stalls. Moby described Circle V as "the coming together of my life's work, animal rights and music. I couldn't be more excited about this event and am so proud to be head-lining."

The second Circle V event took place on November 18, 2017, this time at the Regent Theatre in Los Angeles. Moby headlined the event for the second year, with artists Waka Flocka Flame, Dreamcar, and Raury featuring on the bill.

== Personal life ==
Moby lived in New York City for 21 years. From 1996 to 2010, he lived in an apartment on Mott Street where he also recorded his albums. He then relocated to the Hollywood Hills area of Los Angeles, spending $3.925 million to purchase Wolf's Lair and an additional $2 million to restore it. He sold the property in 2014 for $12.4 million. He also owns an apartment in Little Italy, Manhattan. In 2014, Moby downsized to a smaller home in the Los Feliz neighborhood of Los Angeles.

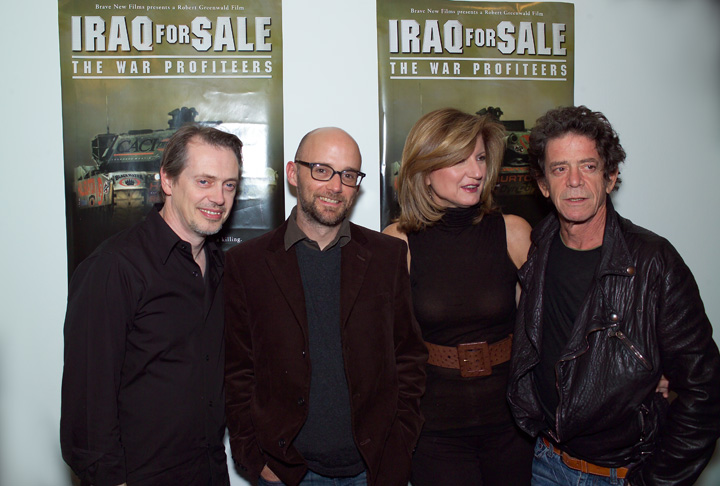
Steve Buscemi, Moby, Arianna Huffington, and Lou Reed at a screening of the film Iraq for Sale: The War Profiteers, 2006

In June 2013, Moby and numerous other celebrities appeared in a video showing support for Chelsea Manning.

Moby identifies himself as heterosexual and cisgender; in a 2018 interview with The Guardian, he claims to have felt "disappointed" to be straight.

Moby practices meditation and has explored different types, including transcendental, Mettā, and Vipassanā.

Moby has spoken publicly about his mental health, including his struggles with anxiety and insomnia.

=== Veganism and animal rights ===
In 1984, Moby was inspired to become a vegetarian by a cat named Tucker that he had found at a dump in Darien, Connecticut. "My mom and I, with the help of George the dachshund, took care of Tucker and he grew up to be the happiest, healthiest cat I'd ever known". In November 1987, while playing with Tucker, "I decided that just as I would never do anything to harm Tucker, or any of our rescued animals, I also would never do anything to harm any animal, anywhere", and became a vegan. He is a strong supporter of animal rights, and described it as his "day job" other than musical projects.

In March 2016, Moby supported the social media campaign #TurnYourNoseUp to end factory farming in association with the nonprofit organization Farms Not Factories.

In 2018, he gave a TedX Talk titled "Why I am a vegan".

In 2019, Moby had "Vegan for life" tattooed on his neck by his friend, tattoo artist Kat Von D. That November, he had "Animal rights" tattooed on his arms to commemorate the 32nd anniversary of being a vegan. He also had "VX" tattooed next to his right eye, the "V" standing for vegan and the "X" for straight edge, referencing his sobriety.

In February 2023, he released Punk Rock Vegan Movie, his documentary about the relationship between the worlds of punk rock and animal rights. He says every time he visits San Francisco, he stops at Rainbow Grocery given his stance on "ethical eating."

=== Drug use ===
From 1987 to 1995, Moby described his life as a "very clean" one and abstained from drugs, alcohol, and "for the most part", sex. After taking LSD once at nineteen, he started to suffer from panic attacks which he continued to experience, but he learned to deal with them more effectively. Moby recalls that shortly after his mother died from lung cancer in 1997, he had "an epiphany" and began to experiment with alcohol, drugs, and sex. This continued for four years after the commercial success of Play. He became a self-confessed "old-timey alcoholic". During his 18 tour in 2002, he found himself being argumentative and alienating close friends. At the end of the year, he wished to make amends and live a healthier lifestyle and promised a girlfriend that he would quit alcohol for one month; he lasted two weeks. Moby continued to drink to excess and would ask audiences at concerts to give him drugs. Matters culminated shortly after he turned 43 when he attempted suicide; he had his last drink on October 18, 2008, and has since attended Alcoholics Anonymous meetings. In 2016, he said of his sobriety: "Since I stopped and reoriented myself towards things that have meaning, everything has gotten a million times better".

=== Spirituality and faith ===
Moby has adopted different faiths throughout his life. He identified himself as an atheist when he was growing up, followed by agnostic, then "a good eight or ten years of being quite a serious Christian", during which time he taught Bible studies. Around 1985, he read the teachings of Christ, including the New Testament and the Gospels and "was instantly struck by the idea that Christ was somehow divine. When I say I love Christ and love the teachings of Christ, I mean that in the most simple and naïve and subjective way. I'm not saying I'm right, and I certainly wouldn't criticize anyone else's beliefs."

In the liner notes of Animal Rights (1996), Moby wrote: "I wouldn't necessarily consider myself a Christian in the conventional sense of the word, where I go to church or believe in cultural Christianity, but I really do love Christ and recognize him in whatever capacity as I can understand it as God. One of my problems with the church and conventional Christianity is it seems like their focus doesn't have much to do with the teachings of Christ, but rather with their own social agenda". In 2014, Moby pointed out that if he needed to label himself, it would be as a "Taoist–Christian–agnostic quantum mechanic." In 2019, Moby said that he is not a Christian, "but my life is geared towards God [...] I have no idea who or what God might be."

=== Charity ===
Moby’s primary focus is fighting for animal rights and he works closely with organizations like The Humane Society Legislative Fund, Animal Equality, The Humane League, The Animal Legal Defense Fund, Mercy for Animals, The Gentle Barn, Farm Sanctuary, Akashinga, Animal Charity Evaluators, The Jane Goodall institute, and Faunalytics. He supports various venture capital firms that are dedicated to plant based proteins, food and tech, including Stray Dog Capital, Unovis Assets Management, Future Ventures and Obvious Ventures.

Moby is also an advocate for a variety of other causes. He created MoveOn Voter Fund's Bush in 30 Seconds contest along with singer and MoveOn Cultural Director Laura Dawn and MoveOn Executive Director Eli Pariser. The music video for the song "Disco Lies" from Last Night has heavy anti-meat industrial themes. He also actively engages in nonpartisan activism and serves on the Board of Directors of Amend.org, a nonprofit organization that implements injury-prevention programs in Africa.

Additionally, he supports The Physicians Committee for Responsible Medicine, The Good Food Initiative, Environmental Working Group, ACLU, Direct Action Everywhere, Southern Poverty Law Center, Brady Campaign, Every Town for Gun Safety, NutritionFacts.org, and Support and Feed.

Moby is a member of the board of directors of the Institute for Music and Neurologic Function (IMNF), a not-for-profit organization dedicated to advancing scientific inquiry into music and the brain and to developing clinical treatments to benefit people of all ages. He has also performed on various benefit concerts to help increase awareness for music therapy and raise funds for the institute. In 2004, he was honored with the IMNF's Music Has Power Award for his advocacy of music therapy and for his dedication and support to its recording studio program.

He is an advocate of net neutrality and testified before a United States House of Representatives committee debating the issue in 2006.

In 2007, Moby launched mobygratis.com, a website of unlicensed music for filmmakers and film students to use in any independent, non-commercial, or non-profit film, video, or short. If a film is commercially successful, all revenue from commercial licence fees granted via mobygratis is donated to Humane Society of the United States. In 2025, Moby relaunched mobygratis with 500 new, free songs for creators. These 500 new songs also include multitracks enabling people to remix and collaborate with the music.

In 2008, he participated in Songs for Tibet, an album to support Tibet and the Dalai Lama Tenzin Gyatso. In a 2021 interview, he discussed the experience and called the Dalai Lama "a wonderful inspired and inspiring man".

In April 2009, Moby spoke about his personal experiences of Transcendental Meditation at the benefit concert Change Begins Within of the David Lynch Foundation in New York City. In April 2015, Moby performed "Go" at the evening of a David Lynch tribute event, hosted at the Theatre at Ace Hotel in Los Angeles, which highlighted the work of the David Lynch Foundation and raised funds to teach Transcendental Meditation to local youth.

In April 2018, Moby auctioned more than 100 pieces of musical equipment via Reverb.com to raise funds for the nonprofit organization Physicians Committee for Responsible Medicine, thinking it was better to sell it for a good cause rather than keep it in storage. Moby held a second sale for the organization in June 2018 consisting of his personal record collection, including records that he used for DJ sets in his early career and his personal copies of his albums. A third was held in October 2018 that included the sale of almost 200 analog drum machines, 100 instruments, and his entire vinyl collection.

In 2018, Moby participated in Al Gore's 24-hour broadcast on climate change and other environmental issues.

Moby is an advocate for Best Friends; he was part of the No-Kill Los Angeles (NKLA) launch celebration and directed a lyric video for his song "Almost Home" that features dogs and cats from the Best Friends Pet Adoption and Spay/Neuter Center in Mission Hills, California.

=== Photography ===
Moby developed an interest in photography at age ten when his uncle, a photographer for The New York Times, gave him a Nikon F camera. He cites Edward Steichen as a major early influence. At 17 he set up a darkroom in his basement and pursued photography while at university. Moby kept his photography private until 2010, when he put some of his work on public display at the Clic Gallery and the Brooklyn Museum in New York City. In May 2011, Moby released a photography book called "Destroyed" containing pictures that were taken during the Wait for Me tour in 2010. It was released in conjunction with his same-titled album, and pictures from it were also put on display. From October to December 2014, Moby showcased his Innocents collection of large-scale photographs at the Fremin Gallery, featuring a post-apocalyptic theme and a cast of fictitious cult members wearing masks.

=== Books ===
In March 2010, Moby and animal activist Miyun Park released Gristle: From Factory Farms to Food Safety (Thinking Twice About the Meat We Eat), a collection of ten essays by various people in the food industry that they edited to detail "unbiased, factual information about the consequences of animal production" and factory farming.

In 2014, Moby began writing an autobiography covering his life and career from his move to New York City in the late 1980s to the recording of Play in 1999. He enjoyed the experience, and wrote approximately 300,000 words before cutting it by half to reach a rough edit of the book. Porcelain: A Memoir was released on May 17, 2016, by Penguin Press. Moby put out the compilation album Music from Porcelain to coincide the book's release, featuring his own tracks and a mixtape of tracks by other artists.

His second memoir, Then It Fell Apart, was released on May 2, 2019, and covers his life and career from 1999 to 2009.

In September 2021, Moby published The Little Pine Cookbook, featuring vegan recipes developed from his time owning his restaurant. In addition to writing books, Moby has written for such publications as The Economist, HuffPost, Rolling Stone, and many more. He has also written forwards for several books.

=== Politics ===
Moby began his political activism at a very young age, going to his first protest march in San Francisco in 1969 when he was 3. When he was 12, he volunteered at the War Resisters League in Westport, Connecticut. In 2000, after putting a “Gore/Lieberman” sticker on the podium during the MTV Music Video Awards, he was censored by the network. After George W. Bush was elected US President that autumn, he worked with moveon.org.

In 2004, he campaigned with Democratic presidential candidate John Kerry and performed the Johnny Cash song “Ring of Fire” with James Taylor at an event on the USS Intrepid in New York City. That same year, he played at the Pro-Choice March on the DC mall alongside Gloria Steinem.

In 2016, he campaigned for Hillary Clinton with Barry Gordy, Bill Clinton, and Barry Diller. He DJ’ed at the first Women’s March in Los Angeles alongside artist Shepard Fairey and Miley Cyrus. He continues supporting multiple political organizations, like the Democratic Congressional Campaign Committee, the Democratic Senatorial Campaign Committee and the Democratic National Committee.

Moby endorsed Kamala Harris in the 2024 United States presidential election.

== Discography ==
Studio albums

- Moby (1992)
- Ambient (1993)
- Everything Is Wrong (1995)
- Animal Rights (1996)
- Play (1999)
- 18 (2002)
- Hotel (2005)
- Last Night (2008)
- Wait for Me (2009)
- Destroyed (2011)
- Innocents (2013)
- Long Ambients 1: Calm. Sleep. (2016)
- These Systems Are Failing (2016)
- More Fast Songs About the Apocalypse (2017)
- Everything Was Beautiful, and Nothing Hurt (2018)
- Long Ambients 2 (2019)
- All Visible Objects (2020)
- Live Ambients – Improvised Recordings Vol. 1 (2020)
- Reprise (2021)
- Ambient 23 (2023)
- Resound NYC (2023)
- Always Centered at Night (2024)
- Future Quiet (2026)

== Awards ==
Award	Year	Nominee(s)	Category	Result	Ref.
Adopt the Arts	2019	Himself	Sound and Vision Award	Won	
Animal Equality	2016	Himself	Animal Hero Award	Won	
ArtworxLA	2015	Himself	Honoree	Won	
BDS Certified Spin Awards	2003	"South Side"	300,000 Spins	Won	
BMI Film & TV Awards	2002	Himself	Certificate of Achievement	Won	
BMI Pop Awards	2002	"South Side"	Award-Winning Song	Won	
Berlin Music Video Awards	2021	"My Only Love"	Animation	Nominated	
Billboard Music Awards	2002	18	Top Electronic Album	Won	
Billboard Music Awards	2002	Himself	Top Electronic Artist	Won	
Billboard Music Awards	2005	Himself	Top Electronic Artist	Nominated	
Billboard Music Awards	2005	Hotel	Top Electronic Album	Nominated	
Billboard Music Video Awards	2000	"Bodyrock"	Maximum Vision Award	Nominated	
Billboard Music Video Awards	2000	"Bodyrock"	Dance Clip of the Year	Won	
Brit Awards	2000	Himself	International Male Solo Artist	Nominated	
Brit Awards	2003	Himself	International Male Solo Artist	Nominated	
Classic Pop Readers' Awards	2020	Then It Fell Apart	Book of the Year	Nominated	
Clio Awards	2019	"ASAP Forever" (with ASAP Rocky)	Best Visual Effects	Won	
Creative Coalition	2023	Himself	Spotlight Initiative Award	Won	
D&AD Awards	2000	"Bodyrock"	Direction	Wood Pencil	
D&AD Awards	2019	"ASAP Forever" (with ASAP Rocky)	Best Editing	Nominated	
DanceStar Awards	2000	Himself	DanceStar of the Year	Won	
DanceStar Awards	2000	Play	Best Album	Won	
DanceStar Awards	2003	Himself	Best US Act	Won	
DanceStar Awards	2004	Himself	Outstanding Contribution to Dance Music	Won	
DanceStar Awards	2004	18 B Sides + DVD	Best Music DVD	Won	
ECHO Awards	2006	Himself	Best International Male	Nominated	
Environmental Media Awards	2016	Himself	Mission in Music Award	Won	
Electronic Music Awards	2017	Himself	Lifetime Achievement Award	Won	
GAFFA-Prisen Awards	2019	Himself	Best International Artist	Nominated	
GAFFA-Prisen Awards	2019	Everything Was Beautiful, and Nothing Hurt	Best International Album	Nominated	
Grammy Awards	2000	Play	Best Alternative Music Performance	Nominated	
Grammy Awards	2000	"Bodyrock"	Best Rock Instrumental Performance	Nominated	
Grammy Awards	2001	"Natural Blues"	Best Dance Recording	Nominated	
Grammy Awards	2000	Play: The DVD	Best Music Video, Long Form	Nominated	
Grammy Awards	2003	"18"	Best Pop Instrumental Performance	Nominated	
Grammy Awards	2009	Last Night	Best Electronic/Dance Album	Nominated	
Hungarian Music Awards	2003	18	Best Foreign Dance Album	Nominated	
Hungarian Music Awards	2011	Himself	Electronic Music Production of the Year	Nominated	
IFPI Platinum Europe Awards	2001	Play	Album Title	Won	
IFPI Platinum Europe Awards	2002	Play	Album Title	Won	
IFPI Platinum Europe Awards	2003	18	Album Title	Won	
In Defense of Animals	2023	Himself	Guardian Award	Won	
Lunas del Auditorio	2004	Himself	Espectaculo Alternativo	Nominated	
Lunas del Auditorio	2006	Himself	Musica Electronica	Won	
Lunas del Auditorio	2010	Himself	Musica Electronica	Nominated	
MTV Asia Awards	2003	Himself	Best Male	Nominated	
MTV Europe Music Awards	1995	Himself	Best Dance	Nominated	
MTV Europe Music Awards	2000	Himself	Best Dance	Nominated	
MTV Europe Music Awards	2000	"Natural Blues"	Best Video	Won	
MTV Europe Music Awards	2000	Play	Best Album	Nominated	
MTV Europe Music Awards	2002	Himself	Web Awards	Won	
MTV Europe Music Awards	2002	Himself	Best Dance	Nominated	
MTV Europe Music Awards	2003	Himself	Best Dance	Nominated	
MTV Europe Music Awards	2005	Himself	Best Male	Nominated	
MTV Russian Music Awards	2005	Himself	Best International Act	Nominated	
MTV Video Music Awards	2000	"Natural Blues"	Best Male Video	Nominated	
MTV Video Music Awards	2001	"South Side"	Best Male Video	Won	
MTV Video Music Awards	2002	"We Are All Made of Stars"	Best Cinematography	Won	
MTV VMAJ	2003	"We Are All Made of Stars"	Best Dance Video	Nominated	
MVPA Awards	2000	"Run On"	Electronic Video of the Year	Nominated	
MVPA Awards	2001	"South Side"	Pop Video of the Year	Nominated	
MVPA Awards	2001	"South Side"	Best Colorist/Telecine	Nominated	
MVPA Awards	2001	"South Side"	Best Hair in a Video	Nominated	
MVPA Awards	2001	"Porcelain"	Alternative Video of the Year	Nominated	
MVPA Awards	2003	"In This World"	Best Directional Debut	Won	
MVPA Awards	2003	"In This World"	Best Electronic Video	Won	
MVPA Awards	2007	"New York, New York"	Best Electronic Video	Nominated	
MVPA Awards	2007	"New York, New York"	Best Choreography	Nominated	
Music Television Awards	2000	Himself	Best Male	Nominated	
Music Television Awards	2000	Himself	Best Dance	Nominated	
Music Television Awards	2000	"Natural Blues"	Best Video	Nominated	
Music Television Awards	2008	Himself	Best Dance	Nominated	
Music Week Awards	2001	Himself	International Breakthrough Award	Won	
My VH1 Music Awards	2001	Himself	Best Male	Nominated	
My VH1 Music Awards	2001	"South Side"	Best Collaboration	Nominated	
My VH1 Music Awards	2001	"South Side"	Favorite Video	Nominated	
NAMM	2015	Himself	Music for Life Award	Won	
NME Awards	2000	Himself	Best Solo Artist	Nominated	
NME Awards	2000	Himself	Best Dance Act	Nominated	
NME Awards	2001	Himself	Best Dance Act	Nominated	
NME Awards	2001	Himself	Best Live Act	Won	
NRJ Music Awards	2001	Himself	International Male Artist of the Year	Won	
NRJ Music Awards	2001	Play	International Album of the Year	Nominated	
NRJ Music Awards	2007	Himself (with Mylene Farmer)	Francophone Duo/Group of the Year	Nominated	
Online Music Awards	1999	Himself	Best Electronic Fansite	Nominated	
Q Awards	2000	Himself	Best Live Act	Nominated	
Q Awards	2002	Himself	Best Producer	Won	
Opus Klassik	2022	Reprise	Classics Without Limits	Won	
PETA	2001	Himself	Humanitarian Award	Won	
San Pedro International Film Festival	2023	Punk Rock Vegan Movie	Best Documentary Award	Won	
SPIN (magazine)	2003	Himself	Readers Poll Most Underrated Singer	Won	
Sputnik (radio station)	2005	Himself	Innovator Award	Won	
TMF Awards	2000	Play	Best Album International	Won	
Teen Choice Awards	2001	"South Side"	Choice Dance Track	Nominated	
Teen Choice Awards	2002	Himself	Choice Male Artist	Nominated	
Top of the Pops Awards	2002	Himself	Best Dance Act	Nominated	
UK Music Video Awards	2018	"ASAP Forever" (with ASAP Rocky)	Best Urban Video - International	Nominated	
UK Music Video Awards	2018	"ASAP Forever" (with ASAP Rocky)	Best Colour Grading in a Video	Nominated	
UK Music Video Awards	2020	"My Only Love"	Best Animation	Nominated	
VH1/Vogue Fashion Awards	2000	"Natural Blues"	Visionary Video	Won	
Viva Comet Awards	2000	"Why Does My Heart Feel So Bad?"	Best International Video	Won	
Viva Comet Awards	2000	Himself	Best Live Act	Nominated	
Viva Comet Awards	2000	Himself	Viva Zwei Audience Award	Nominated	
Veggie Awards	2015	Himself	Person of the Year	Won	
Webby Awards	2017	"Are You Lost in the World Like Me?"	Animation	Won	
World Music Awards	2001	Himself	World's Best Selling Alternative Artist of the Year Award	Won	
Žebřík Music Awards	1999	Himself	Best International DJ	Nominated	
Žebřík Music Awards	1999	Play	Best International Album	Nominated	
Žebřík Music Awards	1999	"Why Does My Heart Feel So Bad?"	Best International Song	Nominated	
Žebřík Music Awards	1999	"Bodyrock"	Best International Video	Nominated	
Žebřík Music Awards	2000	"Porcelain"	Best International Song	Nominated	
Žebřík Music Awards	2000	Himself	Best International Instrumentalist	Nominated	
Žebřík Music Awards	2000	Himself	Best International Personality	Nominated	
Žebřík Music Awards	2000	Himself	Best International DJ	Nominated	
Žebřík Music Awards	2001	Himself	Best International DJ	Nominated	
Žebřík Music Awards	2002	Himself	Best International DJ	Nominated	
Žebřík Music Awards	2002	18	Best International Album	Nominated	
Žebřík Music Awards	2002	"In This World"	Best International Song	Nominated	
Žebřík Music Awards	2003	Himself	Best International DJ	Nominated	
Žebřík Music Awards	2005	Hotel	Best International Album	Nominated	

== See also ==
- List of animal rights advocates
- List of people from Harlem

== Sources ==
- James, Martin (2001). Moby: Replay – His Life and Times. Olmstead Press. ISBN 978-1-58-754011-0.
