= Long Ambients 1: Calm. Sleep. =

Studio album by Moby
- Released: February 25, 2016
- Genre: Ambient
- Length: 244:47
- Label: Little Idiot
- Producer: Moby

Moby chronology
Innocents (2013)	Long Ambients 1: Calm. Sleep. (2016)	Music from Porcelain (2016)

Long Ambients 1: Calm. Sleep. is the twelfth studio album by American electronica musician Moby. It was released on February 25, 2016, as a free download on his Little Pine restaurant Web site and his own Web site. The album consists of around four hours of recordings Moby produced for his own personal listening, which he subsequently made available for downloading and streaming without cost or licensing. In March 2019, Moby released a follow-up ambient album, Long Ambients 2.

"LA1"

"LA2"

"LA3"

"LA4"

"LA5"

"LA6"

"LA7"

"LA8"

"LA9"

"LA10"

"LA11"

== Critical reception ==
Paul Simpson of AllMusic viewed the album positively, calling it an "incredibly beautiful, immersive listening experience". He felt that the tracks were easy to "get lost in, or maybe succumb to, as it feels like there's no way out", while working "magnificently" as sleeping or relaxing music to calm listeners down.

== Track listing ==
No.	Title	Length
1.	"LA1"	20:52
2.	"LA2"	19:00
3.	"LA3"	22:52
4.	"LA4"	17:30
5.	"LA5"	35:40
6.	"LA6"	19:12
7.	"LA7"	18:04
8.	"LA8"	20:06
9.	"LA9"	27:32
10.	"LA10"	23:40
11.	"LA11"	20:24
Total length:		244:47

== Charts ==
Chart (2017)	Peak position
Belgian Albums (Ultratop Wallonia)	198
US New Age Albums (Billboard)	2

== See also ==
- Sleep, album by Max Richter created to fit a full night's sleep
- Music and sleep
