= Stone Foundation =

English soul band

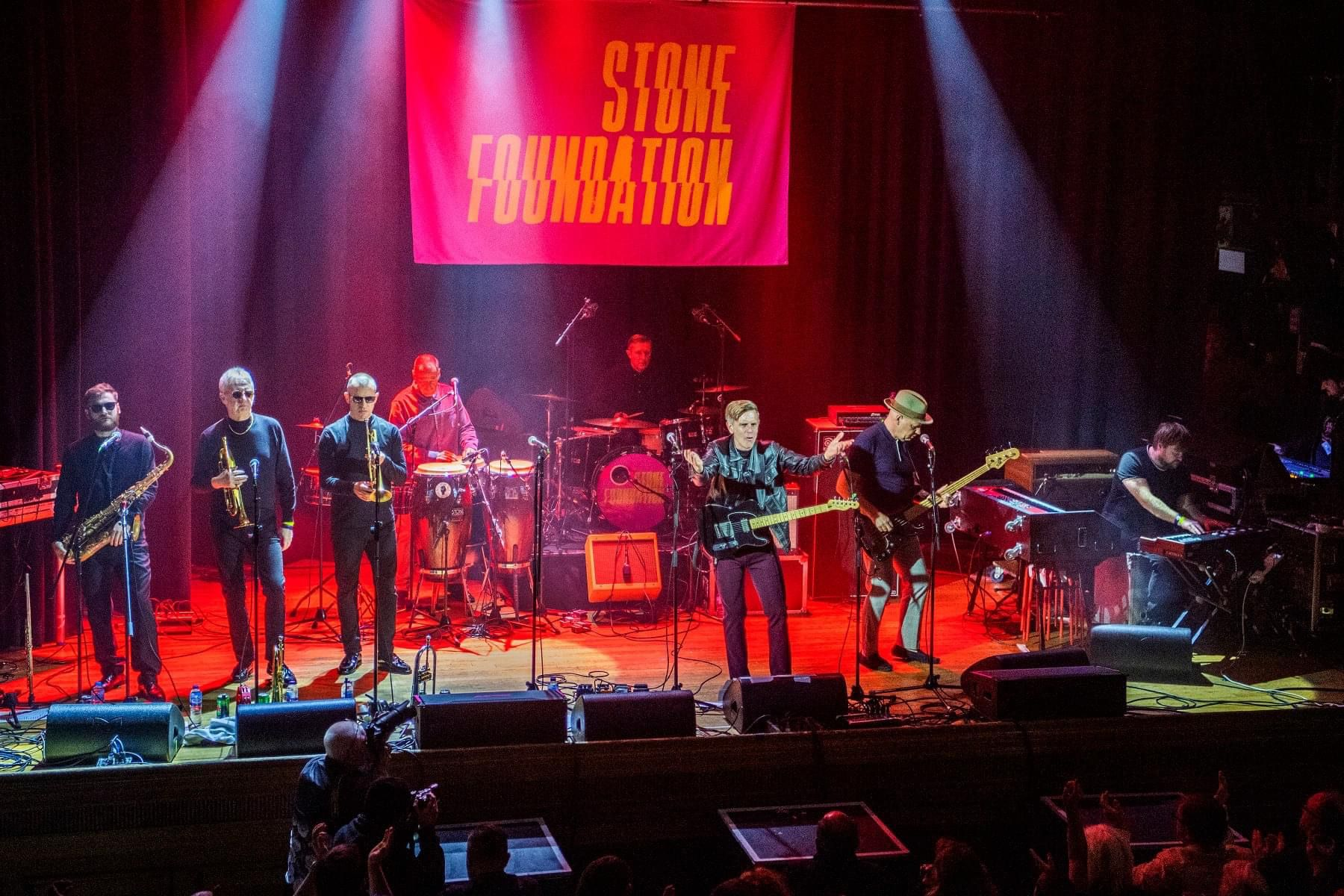

Background information
- Genres: Soul; funk; jazz; R&B
- Years active: 1998-present
- Label: 100% Records
- Members: Neil Jones; Neil Sheasby; Mick Talbot; Ian Arnold; Steve Trigg; Dave Boraston; Anthony Gaylard; Dominic Carr
- Past members: Phil Ford

Stone Foundation are an English soul band formed in 1998 by Neil Jones and Neil Sheasby. They have had five top 100 albums on the UK Albums Chart, with their highest-charting album reaching number 25. They have worked with numerous well known musicians including William Bell and frequent collaborator Paul Weller.

== Musical style ==
Stone Foundation have made music that incorporates elements from the genres of soul, jazz, R&B and funk. They have been described as having a tight rhythm section, brass heavy arrangements and rich vocal harmonies.

== History ==
Stone Foundation were formed in the West Midlands, England, by lead singer and guitarist Neil Jones and bassist Neil Sheasby in 1998. In their early years they focused on their live performances and performed extensively in the local music scene. They have released 11 studio albums, a live album and a compilation album.

In their studio album Street Rituals, Stone Foundation collaborated with Paul Weller on most of the album's songs after Weller reached out to the band to work together. Weller also featured on their live album Live Rituals, and recorded their album Everybody, Anyone at Weller's Black Barn Studios. Weller featured on five tracks from the album. On this album, Weller, Mick Talbot and Steve White—three members of the former pop band The Style Council—played together for the first time since Weller's album Stanley Road.

Stone Foundation played at Glastonbury Festival in 2017 and have been an opening act for Madness, The Specials, Jamiroquai, Mavis Staples, and Paul Weller.

== Band members ==
=== Current ===
- Niel Jones – lead vocals, guitar
- Niel Sheasby – bass
- Mick Talbot – keyboard
- Ian Arnold – keyboard
- Steve Trigg – trumpet
- Dave Boraston – trumpet
- Anthony Gaylard – saxophone
- Dominic Carr – drums

=== Former ===
- Phil Ford – drums

== Discography ==
=== Studio albums ===
- In Our Time (2005)
- Small Town Soul (2008)
- Away from the Grain (2010)
- The Three Shades of... Stone Foundation (2011)
- To Find the Spirit (2014)
- A Life Unlimited (2015)
- Street Rituals (2017)
- Everybody, Anyone (2018)
- Is Love Enough? (2020)
- Outside Looking In (2022)
- The Revival of Survival (2025)

=== Live albums ===
- Live Rituals (2017)

=== Compilation albums ===
- Standing in the Light: 25 Years of Stone Foundation (2023)
