= World Sleep Day =

Annual event

World Sleep Day (the Friday before the northern hemisphere vernal equinox) is an annual event organized by the World Sleep Day Committee of the World Sleep Society, formerly World Association of Sleep Medicine (WASM), since 2008. The goal is to celebrate the benefits of good and healthy sleep and to draw society's attention to the burden of sleep problems and their medical, educational, and social aspects, and to promote the prevention and management of sleep disorders.

== Sleeplessness ==
It was estimated in 2019 that sleep deprivation cost the US over $400 billion a year with Japan losing $138 billion, Germany $60 billion, the UK $50 billion, and Canada $21 billion.

In an article in The Guardian in 2019, World Sleep Day was criticized as helping to turn sleep into a commodity and pushing the idea that everyone should aspire to a single unbroken block of sleep, an idea which historians say is a recent invention.

== Annual celebration ==
World Sleep Day is observed annually on the Friday before the March Equinox. The first World Sleep Day was held on 14 March 2008. Events involving discussions, presentations of educational materials and exhibitions take place around the world and online.

Year	Date	Slogan
2008	14 March	'Sleep well, live fully awake'
2009	20 March	'Drive alert, arrive safe'
2010	19 March	'Sleep Well, Stay Healthy'
2011	18 March	'Sleep Well, Grow Healthy'
2012	16 March	'Breathe Easily, Sleep Well'
2013	15 March	'Good Sleep, Healthy Aging'
2014	14 March	'Restful Sleep, Easy Breathing, Healthy Body'
2015	13 March	'When sleep is sound, health and happiness abound'
2016	18 March	'Good Sleep is a Reachable Dream'
2017	17 March	'Sleep Soundly, Nurture Life'
2018	16 March	'Join the Sleep World, Preserve Your Rhythms to Enjoy Life'
2019	15 March	'Healthy Sleep, Healthy Aging'
2020	13 March	'Better Sleep, Better Life, Better Planet'
2021	19 March	'Regular Sleep, Healthy Future'
2022	18 March	'Quality Sleep, Sound Mind, Happy World'
2023	17 March	'Sleep Is Essential for Health'
2024	15 March	'Sleep Equity for Global Health'
2025	14 March	'Make Sleep Health a Priority'
2026	13 March	'Sleep Well, Live Better'
