= Then It Fell Apart =

Book by Moby

- First edition cover
- Author: Moby
- Audio read by: Moby
- Language: English
- Subject: Moby; New York house; veganism; Christianity; animal rights; recreational drug use
- Genre: Memoir
- Set in: 2000s New York City
- Publisher: Faber & Faber Social
- Publication date: 2019
- Publication place: United States
- Media type: Print (hardcover and paperback); digital; audio
- ISBN: 9780571348893 (hardcover first edition)
- Preceded by: Porcelain: A Memoir
- Website: Official website

Then It Fell Apart is a 2019 memoir by American electronica musician Moby. Moby had previously written a memoir called Porcelain: A Memoir, published in 2016, which covered his life pre-fame. Then It Fell Apart covers the subsequent decade from 1999 to 2009 when Moby released the album Play to acclaim and success.

== Synopsis ==
The memoir predominantly deals with Moby's life from 1999 to 2009 with some flashbacks to his early childhood. In particular, the memoir deals with his surprise at the accidental success of Play, his descent into alcohol addiction, and his decision in 2007 to finally go to rehab in order to stay sober.

== Controversies and inaccuracies ==
In his memoir, Moby detailed several flings he had had with famous women, notably including actress Natalie Portman among them. In his memoir, he claimed that they were together for several weeks in 1999 when she was 20 and he was 33. Portman subsequently denied that they had ever had a relationship, also pointing out that there were 16 years between them and that she was 18 in 1999. In an interview with Harper's Bazaar, Portman said "I was surprised to hear that he characterised the very short time that I knew him as dating because my recollection is a much older man being creepy with me when I had just graduated high school." In response, Moby repeatedly took to his Instagram to re-assert that they had dated. He later publicly apologized to Portman on Instagram, writing, "I accept that given the dynamic of our almost 14 year age difference I absolutely should've acted more responsibly and respectfully when Natalie and I first met almost 20 years ago." On May 28, 2019, due to the backlash he had received, Moby cancelled the remainder of his book tour.

Moby also revealed that in 2001, he rubbed his flaccid penis on Donald Trump at a party after being dared to do so by his then-girlfriend. Details of this incident were later called into question by Vanity Fair, who revealed that, based on Moby's own description of events, the incident most likely took place years later.

== Reception ==
Kitty Empire writing for The Guardian called it "funny and often harrowing".
