= Lady Blackbird =

American singer-songwriter (born 1985)

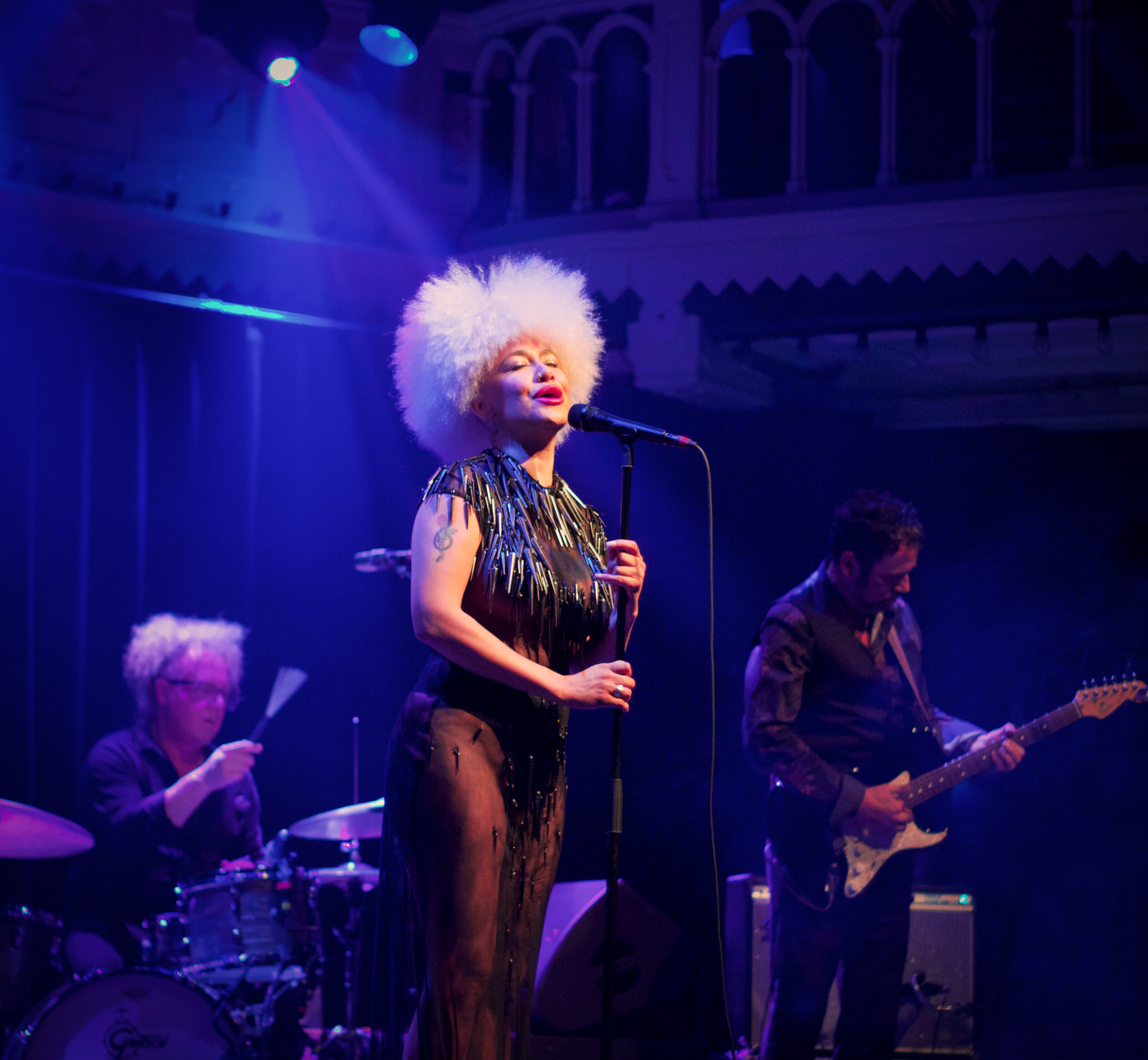
- Performing in Amsterdam in 2022

Background information
- Also known as: Charley Row
- Born: Marley Munroe; 18 January 1985 (age 41)
- Origin: Farmington, New Mexico
- Genres: Jazz; soul; blues; alternative rock; contemporary Christian
- Labels: Epic Records; BMG
- Website: ladyblackbird.com

Marley Munroe (born 18 January 1985), known professionally as Lady Blackbird, is an American-born jazz and soul singer-songwriter, working primarily in the United Kingdom. She has been described as "the Grace Jones of jazz".

== Career ==
=== Early career ===
Marley Munroe was raised in Farmington, New Mexico by a religious family and was encouraged by her parents to sing from a young age, first performing the national anthem at local basketball games and in church. By 12, she signed with a Christian record label based in Nashville, which resulted in work with the rap and rock trio DC Talk. This contract was in place until Munroe was aged 18 in around 2003, but she had realised by 16 that she did not identify fully with the Christian music world and decided to leave at the contract's end. Munroe then became an independent musician, touring with DC Talk's TobyMac and appearing on his first four solo albums, and doing sessions in New York City and Los Angeles. This included collaborations with notable artists such as Jimmy Jam and Terry Lewis, Sam Watters, Tricky Stewart and Louis Biancaniello.

Her next record deal was signed with Epic Records in 2013. Munroe released two pop-soul singles on the label, but left relatively soon afterward due to creative differences, as "Epic wanted more of an R&B direction." Around this time, Munroe wrote and sang backing vocals for Anastacia's 2014 single "Staring at the Sun".

=== 2020: "Blackbird" and early success ===
Following the end of her contract with Epic, Munroe began working with friend and Grammy-nominated producer Chris Seefried. In his LA studio, they experimented with jazz ballads, and recorded an original song called "Nobody's Sweetheart" and an interpretation of the 1966 song "Blackbird" by Nina Simone, using a cappella vocals and then building the music around Munroe's voice. The song inspired Munroe to take up the stage name Lady Blackbird, rather than using her real name as she had previously planned.

"Blackbird" was released in May 2020 as Munroe's debut single under the Lady Blackbird moniker, bringing her to mainstream critical attention. Despite having been recorded a year earlier, its release coincided with the Black Lives Matter movement in the aftermath of the murder of George Floyd, bringing a sombre contemporary context to the song about Black womanhood.

=== 2021–2022: Black Acid Soul ===
Munroe signed to BMG Rights Management in July 2021. Her debut album, Black Acid Soul, a further collaboration with Seefried, was released on 3 September 2021, with physical editions released on 28 January 2022. The album bears a strong jazz influence and emphasis on pared-back vocals, with a number of covers and reinterpretations of songs from the 1960s and 70s. These include "Collage" by The James Gang, "It'll Never Happen Again" by Tim Hardin, and "Wanted Dead or Alive" by The Voices of East Harlem. The title was coined by Seefried as a made-up sub-genre, and is also the name of the final track.

The album peaked at number 6 on the UK Albums Chart. It also entered the Official Jazz chart at Number One, as well as number 20 on the Vinyl chart. Three songs also hit number one on the UK Indie Breakers Chart through 2022 and 2023. A two-disc deluxe edition, containing five bonus tracks and some remixes, was released in October 2022. The singles "Feel It Comin" and "Woman" peaked at number 39 and 35, respectively, on the Official UK Top 40.

Black Acid Soul received a five-star review in The Guardian, with Alexis Petridis describing it as "musically understated, stark and rooted in jazz". Petridis was "struck by the sense of an artist who's finally found her calling" and noted, "these are songs and performances that burn deep into you."

Following the album's release, Munroe performed on a number of television shows, including The Graham Norton Show, The Jonathan Ross Show, and Radio 2's Piano Room, as well as at numerous jazz festivals and supporting Gregory Porter on tour.

=== 2023–present: Second album ===
Munroe has said her planned second album is "shaping up to be about women's empowerment".

In 2023, producer Trevor Horn recorded a remake of Grace Jones' "Slave to the Rhythm", which he co-wrote, with Lady Blackbird on lead vocals. It was released on 25 September as the lead single from Horn's album Echoes: Ancient & Modern.

Lady Blackbird released her second album, Slang Spirituals on September 2024.

In October 2024 Lady Blackbird sang on the UK's Strictly Come Dancing: The Results.

== Awards and nominations ==
At the Jazz FM Awards, Lady Blackbird won 2022 International Jazz Act of the Year, having been nominated alongside trumpeter Theo Croker and New Orleans musician Trombone Shorty, whom Seefried has also produced.

== Discography ==
=== Albums ===
List of albums by Lady Blackbird
| Year | Title | Peak chart positions | | |
| Year | Title | UK Albums Sales | UK Jazz & Blues | SCO |
|---|---|---|---|---|
| 2021 | Black Acid Soul | 16 | 1 | 21 |
| 2024 | Slang Spirituals | 14 | 1 | 16 |

=== EPs ===
List of EPs by Lady Blackbird
| Year | Title |
|---|---|
| 2021 | Self-Inflicted Voodoo (as Charley Row) |

=== Singles ===
List of singles by Lady Blackbird
| Year | Title | Peak chart positions | | Album |
| Year | Title | US AAA | UK Singles Sales | Album |
|---|---|---|---|---|
| 2013 | "Boomerang" (as Marley Munroe) | — | — | non-album single |
| 2020 | "Blackbird" | — | — | Black Acid Soul |
| 2020 | "Beware the Stranger" | — | — | Black Acid Soul |
| 2020 | "Collage" | — | — | Black Acid Soul |
| 2021 | "It's Not That Easy" | — | — | Black Acid Soul |
| 2021 | "It'll Never Happen Again" | — | — | Black Acid Soul |
| 2022 | "Lost and Looking" | — | — | Black Acid Soul |
| 2022 | "Did Somebody Make a Fool Out of You" | — | — | Black Acid Soul (deluxe) |
| 2022 | "Feel It Comin" | — | 39 | Black Acid Soul (deluxe) |
| 2023 | "Woman" | — | 35 | Black Acid Soul (deluxe) |
| 2023 | "Baby I Just Don't" | — | — | Black Acid Soul (deluxe) |
| 2024 | "Reborn" | — | 83 | Slang Spirituals |
| 2024 | "Let Not (Your Heart Be Troubled)" | — | — | Slang Spirituals |
| 2024 | "Like a Woman" | 21 | — | Slang Spirituals |

List of promotional singles by Lady Blackbird
| Year | Title | Album |
|---|---|---|
| 2024 | "Man on a Boat" | Slang Spirituals |

List of featured singles by Lady Blackbird
| Year | Title | Album |
|---|---|---|
| 2017 | "Fantasy" (HouseMechanix feat. Marley Munroe) | —N/a |
| 2020 | "Can't Stand It" (Supernova feat. Marley Munroe) | —N/a |
| 2021 | "Pitch Black" (Sencit feat. Lady Blackbird) | Deathloop soundtrack |
| 2022 | "Don't Wanna Be Normal" (Athletes of God feat. Lady Blackbird) | —N/a |
| 2023 | "Fontella" (Athletes of God × MSW feat. Lady Blackbird) | —N/a |
| 2023 | "Walk with Me" (Moby & Lady Blackbird) | Resound NYC |
| 2023 | "Sunlight" (Subjective feat. Lady Blackbird) | The Start of No Regret |
| 2023 | "Slave to the Rhythm" (Trevor Horn feat. Lady Blackbird) | Echoes: Ancient & Modern |
