= Little Pine (restaurant) =

Defunct restaurant in Los Angeles, California, U.S.

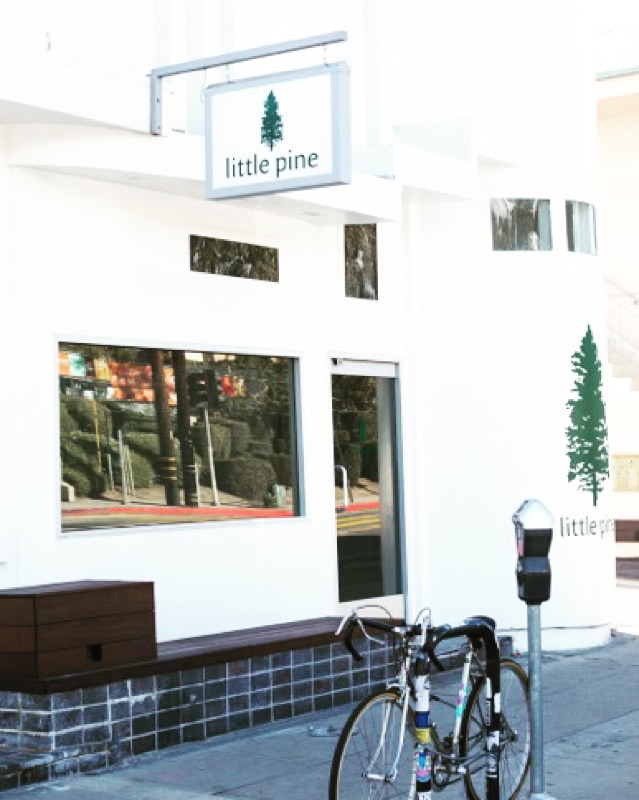
- Exterior photo of Little Pine restaurant in Los Angeles, California
- Interactive map of Little Pine

Restaurant information
- Established: November 2015
- Owner: Moby
- Food type: Organic, vegan food
- Location: 2870 Rowena Avenue, Los Angeles, California, 90039, United States
- Coordinates: 34.10775°N 118.26679°W
- Website: www.littlepinerestaurant.com

Little Pine was a fine-dining vegan bistro located in the Silver Lake neighborhood of Los Angeles, California. It was founded by electronic musician and animal rights activist Moby. In July 2020, local plant-based investors took over operations of the restaurant. The restaurant served organic, vegan, Mediterranean-inspired dishes and has a retail section with art and books, curated by Moby himself. Moby's vision was to create a space that includes various aspects of society that he cares about. The restaurant closed down in December 2022.

== History ==
Little Pine opened on November 19, 2015 and was located in the Silver Lake neighborhood of Los Angeles, California. Original plans for the restaurant to open in the summer of 2015 were delayed. Moby opened the restaurant to create a space that encompasses various matters that he cares about, such as veganism, organic food, community, architecture and design. Moby has stated that Little Pine was created to provide a "... compelling representation of veganism" and to provide a space as "... an extension of our neighborhood and community."

The restaurant's decor had chandeliers and artistic murals created by various local artists, and photographic works of nature created by Moby. The general decor was designed by interior designer Tatum Kendrick. Little Pine was located in an Art Deco-style building that was built in the 1940s. The restaurant has 58 seats. Moby did not allow his own music to be played in the restaurant, and had been a vegan for 28 years when the restaurant opened.

In April 2020, Little Pine announced an indefinite hiatus amid COVID-19. Shortly after, local news outlets began reporting grievances by former employees. Moby addressed the controversy around the restaurant's closing by saying, "I fully accept that the shut down could’ve been handled much better, and for that I take responsibility, and again apologize.”

Little Pine announced plans in March 2022 to reopen in the near future as a for-profit restaurant.

== Fare ==
Little Pine purveyed all plant-based, vegan dishes influenced by Mediterranean cuisine and influences of the cuisine, such as Italian, Spanish and French cuisines, as well as minor aspects of North African cuisine. Brunch dishes included French toast, lemon pancakes and biscuits and gravy. Entrée dishes included stuffed pasta shells, panko crusted piccata, and a Parmesan spinach crêpe, among others. Organic wine, various beers, tea and coffee were are also served, as well as almond milk. Food ingredients were sourced locally whenever possible.

== Reception ==
Food Network named it one of the top 20 vegan restaurants in the United States.

In 2016, Little Pine was awarded the Restaurant of the Year by VegNews.

== See also ==
- List of vegan restaurants
