= Wait for Me: Ambient =

Remix album by Moby
- Released: November 2, 2009
- Genre: Ambient
- Length: 63:15
- Label: Little Idiot; Mute
- Producer: Moby

Moby chronology
| Wait for Me (2009) | Wait for Me: Ambient (2009) | Wait for Me. Remixes! (2010) |

Wait for Me: Ambient is a remix album by American electronica musician Moby. It was released on November 2, 2009. The album is an ambient re-recording by Moby of his album Wait for Me, released earlier in the year.

Wait for Me: Ambient was later included as a bonus disc on the deluxe edition of Wait for Me.

== Track listing ==
All tracks are written by Moby.

| No. | Title | Length |
|---|---|---|
| 1. | "A Seated Night" | 3:56 |
| 2. | "Study War" | 4:30 |
| 3. | "Pale Horses" | 4:56 |
| 4. | "Stay Down" | 6:37 |
| 5. | "Hope Is Gone" | 3:08 |
| 6. | "Wait for Me" | 4:25 |
| 7. | "Division" | 1:38 |
| 8. | "Mistake" | 3:37 |
| 9. | "Walk with Me" | 2:58 |
| 10. | "Isolate" | 3:08 |
| 11. | "Shot in the Back of the Head" | 3:16 |
| 12. | "Slow Light 1" | 3:04 |
| 13. | "Ghost Return" | 2:34 |
| 14. | "Scream Pilots" | 7:49 |
| 15. | "jltf3" | 4:20 |
| 16. | "Slow Light" | 3:09 |
| Total length: | | 63:15 |

== Personnel ==
Credits for Wait for Me: Ambient adapted from album liner notes.

- Moby – engineering, mixing, production, writing, instruments, vocals on "Mistake", artwork
- Hilary Gardner – vocals on "Hope Is Gone"
- Leela James – vocals on "Walk with Me"
- Chris Ritchie – cover design
- Kelli Scarr – vocals on "Wait for Me"
- Starr Black Shere – vocals on "Study War"
- Melody Zimmer – vocals on "jltf3"
- Amelia Zirin-Brown – vocals on "Pale Horses"

== Charts ==
| Chart (2009) | Peak position |
|---|---|
| US Top Dance/Electronic Albums (Billboard) | 15 |
