= Innocents (Moby album) =

Studio album by Moby
- Released: October 1, 2013
- Recorded: January 2012 – June 2013
- Length: 64:27
- Labels: Little Idiot; Mute
- Producers: Moby; Mark 'Spike' Stent

Moby chronology
| Destroyed (2011) | Innocents (2013) | Long Ambients 1: Calm. Sleep. (2016) |

Singles from Innocents
- 1. "A Case for Shame" Released: July 1, 2013; 2. "The Perfect Life" Released: September 10, 2013; 3. "Almost Home" Released: February 24, 2014; 4. "The Last Day" Released: September 2, 2014; 5. "Everything That Rises" Released: April 20, 2015

Innocents is the eleventh studio album by American electronica musician Moby, released in October 2013 by record labels Little Idiot and Mute. The album features collaborations on seven of the album's twelve tracks and was his first to not chart on the Billboard Hot 100

== Background ==
For Record Store Day 2013, Moby released a 7-inch record called "The Lonely Night" which featured former Screaming Trees and Queens of the Stone Age vocalist Mark Lanegan. An accompanying video was created by Colin Rich, of which Moby stated: "I'm really excited to have an experimental music video from this great video artist, and I feel like the slow, rich, and languorous desert visuals fit the song perfectly." The track was subsequently released as a download with remixes by Photek, Gregor Tresher, Freescha and Moby himself.

In July, Moby announced that he would be releasing a new studio album titled Innocents.

== Recording and content ==
Moby recorded Innocents from between January 2012 and June 2013 in his apartment. The album was produced by Grammy-winner Mark 'Spike' Stent (Muse, Depeche Mode, Björk, U2, Coldplay). The album features several guest performers and vocalists, including Cold Specks (previously known as Al Spx) on two tracks, Wayne Coyne (The Flaming Lips), Mark Lanegan (Screaming Trees, Queens of the Stone Age), Damien Jurado, Skylar Grey and Inyang Bassey.

On working with Coyne, Moby stated that "Wayne and I first met in 1995, when The Flaming Lips and I were both opening up for a Red Hot Chili Peppers’ European tour. We became friends, shared a dressing room and the same bad craft services, and watched the Chili Peppers from the side of the stage. I thought of Wayne for this song because the Flaming Lips have evolved in this very open, celebratory band when they play live, and that was the perfect vibe for what I was imagining for 'The Perfect Life'." Of the collaboration with Al Spx, Spx explained that Moby approached her to sing on the new album: "He had heard about me because I'm on Mute in America and the UK. He heard about the record (I Predict a Graceful Expulsion) and asked if I wanted to sing. So I went and I sang. It was a very free, collaborative, creative environment. He was really open to what I was doing and, luckily, he liked what I was doing and it worked really well. I was quite happy to do it and I would probably do it again some day if he asked me."

As with Destroyed, the photographs comprising the album's artwork were all shot by Moby.

== Promotion and release ==
The first official single from the album, "A Case for Shame", was released on July 1, 2013. A video was released to promote the single. A quieter remix of the song by Moby himself (“Under the Manhattan Bridge Version”) was made available for free download from his official Web site. The previously released track "The Lonely Night" was announced to appear on Innocents.

It was revealed in August that "The Perfect Life", which features Coyne, would be the next single, after a casting call for a music video was announced, calling "for obese Speedo-sporting bikers, nude rollerskating ghosts, and an S&M gimp proficient in rhythmic gymnastics" The video saw a premiere on Rolling Stone's website on September 3.

The third single, "Almost Home", featuring Damien Jurado, was announced through a music video competition. The winner, which was revealed on January 6, would receive $6,000, with a shortlist being chosen by Moby. In the meantime, he filmed a lyric video for the track at the Best Friends Animal Society in Los Angeles. On February 4, the official video for the song, which reportedly cost only $10 to make, premiered on Reddit. With this occasion, Moby took time to answer a multitude of questions from fans.

Innocents was released on October 1, 2013 by record labels Little Idiot and Mute.

== Critical reception ==
Professional ratings
Aggregate scores
| Source | Rating |
|---|---|
| AnyDecentMusic? | 5.8/10 |
| Metacritic | 60/100 |
Review scores
| Source | Rating |
| AllMusic | 3.5/5 stars |
| Drowned in Sound | 7/10 |
| Mixmag | 3/5 |
| Mojo | 3/5 stars |
| NME | 4/10 |
| Q | 2/5 stars |
| Rolling Stone | 3/5 stars |
| The Scotsman | 4/5 stars |
| Spin | 8/10 |
| Uncut | 8/10 |

Innocents was met with mixed reviews from music critics. At Metacritic, which assigns a normalized rating out of 100 reviews from mainstream critics, the album received an average score of 60, based on 19 reviews. Andy Kellman from AllMusic described the album as "another downcast, occasionally grand-sounding set suited for solitary home listening" while pointing out the substantial presence of Moby's synthetic strings within the record which makes it his "most powerful work in several years". Raul Spanciu from Sputnikmusic noted the "wider range of collaborators" and the "more relaxed and soulful atmosphere", but felt that the tracks were plagued by formulaic issues, with tracks "carving the same basic canvas for the collaborator to put his own touch on". He selected "A Case For Shame" and "Almost Home" as the album's "essential cuts". Spin's Barry Walters recognised the "hypnotic purity" within Innocents, writing: "... as if [Moby] finally surrendered to the fact that these psalm-like prayers are where he excels — maybe they're only thing he’s truly great at", and labelled the instrumentation as the album's high point. David Pollock from The Scotsman complimented the "bunch of cannily picked collaborations" which "lend this 11th album reassuring depth". Thomas H. Green from Mixmag wrote that Innocents "boasts plenty of [the] epic melancholia" found in tracks "Saints" and "Going Wrong", which "hits a grand, ethereal pitch few could match". Brendon Veevers from Renowned for Sound was confident for Innocents to be the "strong continuation" of Moby's successful 1999 album Play which could "place him back at the top of his game", with the track listing "balanced nicely between vocal fronted pennings with artists old and new and gorgeously arranged instrumentals". Kat Waplington from Drowned in Sound felt that most of the record was "unrecognisable", writing that: "in isolation, I would never have guessed this was Moby." She acknowledged that Innocents wasn't a "simple rinse and repeat" despite the return of Moby's "distinctive synths and chord progressions", and affirmed the "huge range of styles on display" which made the album a "remarkably cohesive and creative record".

John Garrett from Popmatters found the "diverse" roster of special guests artists and co-production with English producer Mark Stent to make the album stand out in Moby's discography, yet felt that Innocents "still sounds like so many other Moby albums", writing: "No matter what changes Moby's attempts to apply to his sound, his musical identity seems too deeply entrenched in the ways that Innocents demonstrates for it to truly absorb anything new." Writing for Rolling Stone, Michaelangelo Matos agreed that Innocents was still a Moby album with "patient tempos, frosted with strings and comfortably melancholy melodies", but realised that the collaboration with Mark Stent "has made him knuckle down; the writing is sharper than on 2009's sketchy Wait for Me or 2011's overblown Destroyed." Michael Roffman of Consequence of Sound described the album as "monastic", since it "ultimately proves that Moby’s happiest where he's been all along, which explains why tracks like "Everything That Rises", "Going Wrong", or "Saints" could slip into 18, Hotel, or Destroyed and nobody would bat an eye." John Murphy of MusicOMH believed that Innocents had the "feel of a new start" seeing that it was Moby's first time working with a co-producer, and was impressed with the "minimal instrumental" in "Going Wrong" and the opening track "Everything That Rises", stating: "...when Innocents works, it does so beautifully".

Exclaim's Vincent Pollard said that Innocents "contains some great vocal performances and catchy hooks" while starting with a "promising foot", but found that the instrumentation "wears thin quickly" once listeners "look past the vocal performances", akin to a "Hollywood blockbuster that blew its entire budget on special effects". Lucy Jones from NME said that despite the "wizened vocals" of Mark Lanegan on "The Lonely Night" and Skylar Grey on "The Last Day", Moby still managed to "bogglingly" create an album "full of saccharine strings, endless loops and narcoleptic synths". Jack Scourfield from Clash criticised the album for being "dull", stating that Moby's attempt to "paper over" the "demonstrable lack of songwriting inspiration with grand string arrangements and a sequence of guest collaborators" only manages to emphasise the tedium.

== Tour ==
Moby performed a DJ set in Las Vegas on September 1, before flying to Australia to DJ at an intimate show in Sydney on the 19th, which forms part of a 3-day promotional tour of Australia for Innocents.

The official Innocents tour consisted of only three shows to be held at The Fonda Theatre in Los Angeles on October 2, 3 and 4. Billed as Moby live + special guests, the show was separated in two parts, the first consisting of material from Innocents, while the second was a greatest-hits set. Each concert was expected to last for three hours. He stated that those would be his only fully live shows of 2013 and 2014. The show on October 4 also streamed live online. Moby stated that the reason for doing little to no touring was "When I go on tour I sit around a lot (cars, airports, hotels, etc), and when I sit around I can't spend my time making music. And pretty much all I want to do in life is stay home and make music. So, thus: a three-date world tour." He conceded that he might return to world touring in the future.

== Track listing ==
All songs written by Moby unless indicated.

| No. | Title | Writer(s) | Length |
|---|---|---|---|
| 1. | "Everything That Rises" | | 4:38 |
| 2. | "A Case for Shame" (with Cold Specks, backing vocals by Inyang Bassey) | Moby; Cold Specks; Jim Anderson | 6:05 |
| 3. | "Almost Home" (with Damien Jurado) | Moby; Damien Jurado | 6:00 |
| 4. | "Going Wrong" | | 3:44 |
| 5. | "The Perfect Life" (with Wayne Coyne) | | 6:03 |
| 6. | "The Last Day" (with Skylar Grey) | Moby; Skylar Grey | 4:41 |
| 7. | "Don't Love Me" (with Inyang Bassey) | | 4:20 |
| 8. | "A Long Time" | | 4:31 |
| 9. | "Saints" | | 4:34 |
| 10. | "Tell Me" (with Cold Specks) | Moby; Cold Specks | 5:33 |
| 11. | "The Lonely Night" (with Mark Lanegan) | Moby; Mark Lanegan | 4:53 |
| 12. | "The Dogs" | | 9:25 |
| Total length: | | | 64:27 |

Deluxe bonus CD EP: Everyone is Gone
| No. | Title | Writer(s) | Length |
|---|---|---|---|
| 1. | "I Tried" (with Julie Mintz) | | 7:19 |
| 2. | "Illot Mollo" | | 3:38 |
| 3. | "Miss Lantern" (with Mindy Jones) | | 4:43 |
| 4. | "Blindness" (with Joy Malcolm) | Moby; Joy Malcolm | 5:39 |
| 5. | "Everyone is Gone" | | 2:31 |
| 6. | "My Machines" | | 4:25 |
| Total length: | | | 28:15 |

== Charts ==
=== Weekly charts ===
| Chart (2013) | Peak position |
|---|---|
| Australian Albums (ARIA) | 35 |
| Austrian Albums (Ö3 Austria) | 16 |
| Belgian Albums (Ultratop Flanders) | 7 |
| Belgian Albums (Ultratop Wallonia) | 5 |
| Dutch Albums (Album Top 100) | 25 |
| French Albums (SNEP) | 18 |
| German Albums (Offizielle Top 100) | 22 |
| Italian Albums (FIMI) | 18 |
| New Zealand Albums (RMNZ) | 39 |
| Norwegian Albums (VG-lista) | 31 |
| Polish Albums (ZPAV) | 27 |
| Spanish Albums (Promusicae) | 65 |
| Swiss Albums (Schweizer Hitparade) | 11 |
| UK Dance Albums (Official Charts) | 8 |
| UK Independent Albums (Official Charts) | 7 |
| US Top Dance Albums (Billboard) | 2 |

=== Year-end charts ===
| Chart (2013) | Position |
|---|---|
| Belgian Albums (Ultratop Wallonia) | 176 |
