= Wait for Me. Remixes! =

Remix album by Moby
- Released: May 17, 2010
- Length: 78:00 (disc one); 72:54 (disc two)
- Label: Little Idiot; Mute
- Producer: Moby

Moby chronology
Wait for Me: Ambient (2009)	Wait for Me. Remixes! (2010)	Destroyed (2011)

Professional ratings
Review scores
Source	Rating
AllMusic	3/5 stars

Wait for Me. Remixes! is a remix album by American electronica musician Moby. It was released on May 17, 2010. The album contains reworked versions of songs from Moby's 2009 album Wait for Me, as well as a DJ mix by Moby himself.

It was announced on Moby's official website on March 23, 2010.

== Track listing ==
All tracks are written by Moby.

Disc one
No.	Title	Length
1.	"Isolate" (Mixhell Remix)	5:22
2.	"Slow Light" (Maps Remix)	5:55
3.	"Wait for Me" (Paul Kalkbrenner Remix)	9:12
4.	"Pale Horses" (Gui Boratto's Last Window Remix)	7:37
5.	"Walk with Me" (Carl Cox Remix)	6:23
6.	"Mistake" (Yuksek Remix)	4:55
7.	"One Time We Lived" (Laurent Wolf Remix)	7:40
8.	"jltf" (Chuckie Remix)	5:34
9.	"Wait for Me" (Laidback Luke Remix)	6:41
10.	"Stay Down" (Popof Remix)	6:17
11.	"Study War" (Savage Skulls Remix)	5:09
12.	"Shot in the Back of the Head" (Tiësto Remix)	7:15
Total length:		78:00

Disc two: DJ mix
No.	Title	Length
1.	"Walk with Me" (Carl Cox Remix)	5:51
2.	"Shot in the Back of the Head" (Tiësto Remix)	6:04
3.	"Wait for Me" (Laidback Luke Remix)	5:54
4.	"Mistake" (Dabruck & Klein Remix)	5:09
5.	"Study War" (Savage Skulls Remix)	5:28
6.	"jltf" (Chuckie Remix)	3:17
7.	"Slow Light" (Maps Remix)	5:17
8.	"One Time We Lived" (Sharooz Remix)	5:47
9.	"Stay Down" (Julian Jeweil Remix)	6:01
10.	"Wait for Me" (Jean Élan Remix)	6:13
11.	"Wait for Me" (Jon Rundell Remix)	6:12
12.	"Stay Down" (Popof Remix)	5:15
13.	"Pale Horses" (Gui Boratto's Last Window Remix)	6:26
Total length:		72:54

== Charts ==
Chart (2010)	Peak position
US Top Dance/Electronic Albums (Billboard)	23
