= A Case for Shame =

Single by Moby and Cold Specks

from the album Innocents
- Released: July 1, 2013
- Recorded: November 2012
- Length: 6:05
- Label: Little Idiot
- Songwriters: Moby; Ladan Hussein
- Producer: Mark "Spike" Stent

Moby singles chronology
"Extreme Ways (Bourne's Legacy)" (2012)	"A Case for Shame" (2013)	"The Perfect Life" (2013)

Cold Specks singles chronology
"Hector" (2012)	"A Case for Shame" (2013)	"Absisto" (2014)

Music video
- "Moby - A Case For Shame (with Cold Specks) - Official video" on YouTube

"A Case for Shame" is a song by American electronica musician Moby. It was released as the first official single from his eleventh studio album Innocents on July 1, 2013. The track is a collaboration with Canadian singer-songwriter Cold Specks.

== Background ==
Moby first came into contact with Cold Specks due to their mutual connection as Mute Records label mates, and after listening to her 2012 album I Predict a Graceful Expulsion, he invited her to collaborate. The two recorded the songs "A Case for Shame" and "Tell Me", the former in November 2012 while Cold Specks was on tour in the United Kingdom. Cold Specks described the recording process as "a very free, collaborative, creative environment... He was really open to what I was doing and luckily he liked what I was doing and it worked really well."

== Music video ==
The music video for "A Case of Shame" was directed by Moby and released on July 17, 2013. Filmed in a pool in his Los Angeles home, the clip's premise was described by Moby as being about "an after-life inhabited by people who are concealing themselves because of shame."

== Track listing ==
- Digital download
1. "A Case for Shame" (Thom Alt-J Remix) – 5:48
2. "A Case for Shame" (All We Ever Wanted Version) – 5:58
3. "A Case for Shame" (Honor Detroit Remix) – 6:19
- Digital download – remixes (IDIOT025BP)
1. "A Case for Shame" (Spartaque Remix) – 8:42
2. "A Case for Shame" (Spartaque Dub) – 8:38
3. "A Case for Shame" (Sharam Jey Remix) – 6:33
4. "A Case for Shame" (Sharam Jey Dub) – 6:34

== Charts ==
Chart (2011)	Peak position
France (SNEP)	119
