= Everything Was Beautiful, and Nothing Hurt (Moby album) =

Studio album by Moby
- Released: March 2, 2018
- Studio: Moby's home studio (Los Angeles, California)
- Genre: Electronica; downtempo; trip hop
- Length: 56:31
- Label: Little Idiot; Mute
- Producer: Moby

Moby chronology
More Fast Songs About the Apocalypse (2017)	Everything Was Beautiful, and Nothing Hurt (2018)	Long Ambients 2 (2019)

Singles from Everything Was Beautiful, and Nothing Hurt
- 1. "Like a Motherless Child" Released: December 11, 2017; 2. "Mere Anarchy" Released: January 29, 2018; 3. "This Wild Darkness" Released: February 26, 2018

Everything Was Beautiful, and Nothing Hurt is the fifteenth studio album by American electronic musician Moby. It was released on March 2, 2018, by the record labels Little Idiot and Mute.

== Background ==
In 2016 and 2017, Moby released two albums with his musical project Moby & the Void Pacific Choir, These Systems Are Failing and More Fast Songs About the Apocalypse, which largely tackled Moby's views on the 2016 United States presidential election and the national political climate. Everything Was Beautiful, and Nothing Hurt marks a stylistic and thematic retreat from the politically themed and punk rock-influenced Void Pacific Choir records. Eschewing overtly political lyrics, the songs on Everything Was Beautiful, and Nothing Hurt explore themes of spirituality, individuality, and humanity. Moby recalled that he "disengaged" himself from politics in the immediate aftermath of the 2016 election, and discussing the election's influence on the album, he said:

After the election, rather than blow my brains out or move to Denmark, I took a step back and said, "The common denominator to everything that's wrong is us, as a species." The subtext of the 20th century, and into the 21st century, is making egregiously terrible choices when we know better. The record itself is – rather than looking at systems and rather than looking at politics – looking at who we are as a species.

Moby described the main theme of the album as "the dialectic between light and dark, between hard and vulnerable", explaining:

I feel like that's the best description of who we are at this point. We're super vulnerable and super dangerous at the same time. We burn through all our resources, we create all this misery, and the end result is we're not very happy. This lunatic party that we've had for the last 100 years of burning and destroying everything would almost be excusable if we were really, really happy. The music on this record is looking at that.

The title Everything Was Beautiful, and Nothing Hurt is derived from a line in Kurt Vonnegut's 1969 novel Slaughterhouse-Five, one of Moby's favorite books; he was struck by the line's "utopian simplicity". Two songs from the album, "Mere Anarchy" and "The Ceremony of Innocence", are named after lines from the 1919 W. B. Yeats poem "The Second Coming", which resonated with Moby as "a horrifying description of what we're going through."

== Production ==
Moby recorded Everything Was Beautiful, and Nothing Hurt at his Los Angeles home studio. During the recording process, Moby was fascinated with exploring the boundaries of studio production. He said that musically, the album was most inspired by "the studio based albums around in the 70s and early 80s – Grace Jones, Marianne Faithfull's Broken English – pre-digital, where people would still use the studio like an instrument. Where they were playing around with synthesising and techniques but they were still working in the analogue realm." Moby was also influenced by the production on certain post-punk, R&B, soul, and reggae records, "where vocals were still very prominent but they were creating sounds that were at times experimental." He aimed to incorporate "sonic imperfections" into the album's songs by utilizing older recording equipment.

According to Clash's Sarah Bradbury, Everything Was Beautiful, and Nothing Hurt finds Moby returning to his earlier "transcendental" electronica sound. Neil Z. Yeung of AllMusic found the album "mostly indebted" to trip hop and Moby's late 1990s musical style, while Billboard journalist Steven J. Horowitz said that it is driven by a "'90s trip-hop aesthetic". Mojo critic Matt Yates described it as a "downtempo electronica" record. The album draws from Moby's musical roots, incorporating influences from dub, soul, and gospel music. In Rolling Stone, Maura Johnston said that it "applies the Moby ideal of soulful vocals and big beats to the not-all-that-farfetched idea of a post-apocalyptic landscape", with Moby's own "brittle" vocals "providing a downcast contrast to the more honeyed approach of his guest vocalists."

== Release ==
On December 11, 2017, Everything Was Beautiful, and Nothing Hurt's title and release date were announced and the album was made available for pre-order. It was released on March 2, 2018, by Moby's own Little Idiot label and Mute Records.

The first single from Everything Was Beautiful, and Nothing Hurt, "Like a Motherless Child", was released on December 11, 2017, coinciding with the announcement of the album. The song peaked at number 33 on the Billboard Adult Alternative Airplay chart. The album's second single, "Mere Anarchy", was released on January 29, 2018. "This Wild Darkness" was released as the album's third single on February 26, 2018.

On July 6, 2018, Moby released the album Everything Was Beautiful, and Nothing Hurt (The EastWest Sessions), which was recorded at EastWest Studios and consists of new versions of songs from the original album.

== Critical reception ==
Professional ratings
Aggregate scores
Source	Rating
AnyDecentMusic?	7.0/10
Metacritic	75/100
Review scores
Source	Rating
AllMusic	4/5 stars
The Daily Telegraph	4/5 stars
Evening Standard	4/5 stars
The Independent	3/5 stars
The Irish Times	4/5 stars
Mixmag	6/10
Mojo	3/5 stars
Pitchfork	5.7/10
Q	4/5 stars
Rolling Stone	3.5/5 stars

Everything Was Beautiful, and Nothing Hurt received generally positive reviews from music critics. At Metacritic, which assigns a normalized rating out of 100 to reviews from mainstream critics, it has an average score of 75 based on 16 reviews, indicating "generally favorable reviews". Neil McCormick of The Daily Telegraph commended Moby's mastery of building songs "to euphoric release" and concluded that "despite its relentlessly downbeat content, Moby's music is just too satisfying to be depressing." Ben Hogwood of MusicOMH found the album's songs sonically comparable to Moby's previous work, but found that their "greater resolve and authenticity" give them "much more of a backbone." Evening Standard critic Elizabeth Aubrey felt that Moby, in returning to his musical roots, had produced "one of his most accessible albums in years." At Exclaim!, Luke Pearson praised the "well-crafted" record as "a tasteful and mature evolution" of Moby's sound. Louise Bruton of The Irish Times deemed it "Moby's most personal album yet" and was compelled by its analysis of "the human condition and the awfulness that that can inflict." Mike Schiller of PopMatters said that while some listeners might be put off by the tracks' slower tempos and "hazy and gauzy" production, Moby mostly succeeds in "turning despair and hopelessness into something engaging".

In a mixed review for Pitchfork, Sasha Geffen criticized the "circuitousness" of Moby's lyrics and found his typically "unvarnished" vocal style less suited to the album's more elaborate music. Ilana Kaplan of The Independent welcomed the inclusion of female vocals throughout the album, which she felt "speaks volumes in 2018", but wrote that the lyrics occasionally feel "overwrought" and "distract from his gorgeous soundscapes". Spin's Annie Zaleski deemed the record "a let down—the equivalent of a sad, deflated Mylar balloon" compared to Moby's previous "buoyant" albums, despite its "glimmers of promise". In The Times, Will Hodgkinson wrote that "those mourning the loss of 1990s trip-hop will have their prayers answered", but described the album as "rather portentous and, frankly, a bit boring."

== Track listing ==
All tracks are written by Moby, except where noted.

No.	Title	Writer(s)	Length
1.	"Mere Anarchy"		5:15
2.	"The Waste of Suns"	Moby; Mindy Jones	4:44
3.	"Like a Motherless Child"		4:37
4.	"The Last of Goodbyes"		4:23
5.	"The Ceremony of Innocence"		3:56
6.	"The Tired and the Hurt"		4:28
7.	"Welcome to Hard Times"		5:08
8.	"The Sorrow Tree"		4:28
9.	"Falling Rain and Light"		4:46
10.	"The Middle Is Gone"		5:13
11.	"This Wild Darkness"		4:09
12.	"A Dark Cloud Is Coming"		5:24
Total length:			56:31

== Personnel ==
Credits are adapted from the album's liner notes.

- Moby – production, recording, vocals, mixing on "Welcome to Hard Times"
- Matthew Grabelsky – cover artwork
- Apollo Jane – vocals on "Welcome to Hard Times", "This Wild Darkness", and "A Dark Cloud Is Coming"
- Mike Jones – layout
- Mindy Jones – vocals on "Mere Anarchy", "The Waste of Suns", "The Last of Goodbyes", "The Tired and the Hurt", and "This Wild Darkness"
- Steve "Dub" Jones – mixing
- Joe Lambert – mastering
- Julie Mintz – vocals on "The Sorrow Tree" and "Falling Rain and Light"
- Brie O'Bannon – vocals on "This Wild Darkness"
- Raquel Rodriguez – vocals on "Like a Motherless Child"

== Charts ==
Chart (2018)	Peak position
Australian Dance Albums (ARIA)	12
Austrian Albums (Ö3 Austria)	36
Belgian Albums (Ultratop Flanders)	8
Belgian Albums (Ultratop Wallonia)	24
Czech Albums (ČNS IFPI)	27
Dutch Albums (Album Top 100)	90
French Albums (SNEP)	106
German Albums (Offizielle Top 100)	38
Irish Albums (IRMA)	56
New Zealand Heatseekers Albums (RMNZ)	10
Polish Albums (ZPAV)	42
Scottish Albums (OCC)	16
Swiss Albums (Schweizer Hitparade)	23
UK Albums (OCC)	30
UK Dance Albums (OCC)	1
UK Independent Albums (OCC)	4
US Independent Albums (Billboard)	7
US Top Album Sales (Billboard)	55
US Top Dance Albums (Billboard)	6
