= Chi2 (band) =

British-Chinese violinists

- Origin: London, United Kingdom
- Genres: Classical, Electronic World
- Years active: 2000–present
- Label: Big Sky Song Ltd
- Members: Liz Chi Yen Liew; Sarah Chi Shang Liew
- Website: www.chi2.co.uk

Chi2 are British-Chinese violinists who play a fusion of classical and electronic music influenced by their Singapore Chinese heritage. They have performed and toured with many pop artists including Moby, Anastacia, Lamb, Goldfrapp, Uriah Heep, Sixpence None The Richer, Boy George, Nelly Furtado, The KLF and The Orb.

The duo stopped performing in 2010.

== History ==
Sisters Liz and Sarah Liew were born to a musical family, their mother was a music teacher and their father played the violin and trumpet. Liz attended the junior Royal Academy of Music and studied music at City University and the Guildhall School of Music and Drama while Sarah studied at Purcell School of Music, Middlesex University and the Academy of Traditional Chinese Opera in Beijing.

Chi2 was formed by the sisters in 2000 and the name originates from their own shared middle name 'chi' which means "precious stone" described by Sarah as "an expression of our roots growing up in multicultural London." Their music fuses electro-acoustic western and eastern sounds with electronic beats on electric and Chinese violins. They began their musical careers performing in clubs and were recruited by dance artist Moby as part of his band for live stadium tours of his albums Play in 1999, to play violin on songs such as Porcelain, Why Does My Heart?, and Natural Blues and have continued to work with him on his 18 in 2002, Wait for Me in 2009/10 and Destroyed in 2011 world tours. They have also performed and recorded with Nelly Furtado, Lamb, Goldfrapp, KLF/Orb. and they have recently worked with Asian Dub Foundation performing live and on their 2011 album A History of Now.

In Summer 2008 and Autumn 2009 they toured their show "Monkey King - A Modern Beijing Opera" in the UK, a brand new spin on the classic Chinese tale performing in venues including Rich Mix in London, De Montfort Hall in Leicester, Everyman Theatre in Cheltenham, Derby Assembly Rooms, Ludlow Assembly Rooms.

== Discography ==
An album entitled Monkey King (Sun Wukong) - A Modern Beijing Opera containing the music of the show was released in 2009 on Big Sky Song Ltd and is available as a digital download.
