= UZU =

Studio album by Yamantaka // Sonic Titan
- Released: October 29, 2013
- Recorded: Winter 2012 – Spring 2013; The Glory Hole; Toronto, CA
- Genre: Progressive rock
- Length: 42:37
- Labels: Paper Bag Records (CA) (PAPER 081); Suicide Squeeze Records (US) (SSQ 124)
- Producer: Alaska B.

Yamantaka // Sonic Titan chronology
| YT//ST (2011) | UZU (2013) |

Singles from UZU
- 1. "One" Released: September 12, 2013; 2. "Windflower" Released: October 10, 2013

Professional ratings
Aggregate scores
| Source | Rating |
|---|---|
| Metacritic | 79/100 |
Review scores
| Source | Rating |
| CMJ | positive |
| Consequence of Sound | 3/5 stars |
| Exclaim! | 9 |
| KRCU | positive |
| No Ripcord | 6 |
| NOW | NNNNN |
| Paste | 8.6 |
| Pitchfork | 7.8 |
| PopMatters | 7/10 stars |
| Under the Radar | 7.5/10 |

UZU is the second studio album by Canadian experimental band Yamantaka // Sonic Titan.

== Release and promotion ==
UZU was released on October 29, 2013, through Paper Bag Records in Canada and Suicide Squeeze Records in the US in CD, digital download, and limited edition vinyl formats. The group embarked on a North America tour to support the album upon its release. The band also released music videos for UZU album tracks "One" and "Saturn's Return", respectively. The track "Lamia" was featured in the Adult Swim Singles Program 2012 as a free download.

== Theme ==
The album has been described as more "poignant and human", compared to their last record YT//ST. The Chinese goddess Mazu is said to be the central character of UZU, and is the figure illustrated on the album cover artwork. The album is said to follow nautical mythological themes to explore feelings of being "lost and adrift" in the world.

== Reception ==
Thus far, the album has received mainly positive reviews from music critics. The aggregate review site Metacritic assigned an average score of "79" to the album based on 9 reviews, indicating "generally favorable reviews".

In a positive review by Exclaim!, reviewer Melody Lau gave the album a "9" praising the album's vocals as "majestically dramatic" and highlighted the album's cohesiveness, stating "the ten tracks on UZU drift into one another like waves of the narrative ocean..." Paste's Mark Lore also gave the album a high mark, "8.6", lauding the album as "stunning and melodic", commenting "this time around, Attwood’s vocals aren’t lurking beneath the fuzz" and that "[One] best represents the band’s sound and concept".

In a somewhat mixed review, Pitchfork reviewer Joe Tangari gave the album a "7.8" and commented on the album's recording, calling it "a bit hazier" than the group debut album, but reflected positively on the drumming and vocal performances. In mixed review by Consequence of Sound reviewer Adam Kivel, Kivel gave the album three out of five stars, viewing the album as less accessible than their debut album, but praised the album's first single, stating Yamantaka // Sonic Titan are at their best when fusing seemingly disparate elements together like they do on "One"".

NOW named the album No. 1 in its "Top 10 Local albums" and No. 2 in its "Top 10 Albums" end of the year lists.

The album was also included in Wired's "The Most Defining Moments of Music in 2013" end of the year list.

The album is a shortlisted nominee for the 2014 Polaris Music Prize.

== Track listing ==
| No. | Title | Length |
|---|---|---|
| 1. | "Atalanta" | 2:39 |
| 2. | "Whalesong" | 5:57 |
| 3. | "Lamia" | 4:23 |
| 4. | "Windflower" | 3:24 |
| 5. | "Hall of Mirrors" | 4:06 |
| 6. | "Sea Sickness, Pt. 1" | 3:23 |
| 7. | "Sea Sickness, Pt. 2" (Theme from 33) | 4:54 |
| 8. | "Bring Me the Hand of Bloody Benzaiten" | 2:45 |
| 9. | "One" | 5:21 |
| 10. | "Saturn's Return" | 5:45 |
| Total length: | | 42:37 |

== Personnel ==
UZU album personnel adapted from Allmusic.

- Alaska B. – cover art, drums, electronics, engineer, keyboards, mixing, percussion, producer
- Ange Loft – vocals, drums, percussion
- Benoit Morier – engineer
- Brendan Swanson – vocals, organ, piano, synthesizer, engineer
- John Ancheta – guitar. bass, engineer
- Jonas Gilbert – additional vocals on "One"
- Ruby Kato Attwood – vocals, cover art
- Ryan Morey – mastering
- Zea D Poku – additional vocals on "One"
