= More Fast Songs About the Apocalypse =

Album by Moby & the Void Pacific Choir

Studio album by Moby & The Void Pacific Choir
- Released: June 12, 2017
- Recorded: 2014–16
- Genres: Hardcore punk; post-punk; punk rock; electronica
- Length: 35:46
- Labels: Little Idiot; Mute
- Producer: Moby

Moby chronology
| These Systems Are Failing (2016) | More Fast Songs About the Apocalypse (2017) | Everything Was Beautiful, and Nothing Hurt (2018) |

More Fast Songs About the Apocalypse is the fourteenth studio album by American electronica musician Moby and the second studio album by Moby & The Void Pacific Choir, a musical project formed by Moby with musicians Jamie Drake, Mindy Jones, Julie Mintz, Joel Nesvadba, Jonathan Nesvadba, and Lauren Tyler Scott. It was released on June 12, 2017 as a free download and released physically on June 16, 2017 by record labels Little Idiot and Mute.

== Background ==
News regarding More Fast Songs About the Apocalypse first appeared in May 2017 as various retail stores began taking vinyl pre-orders. A few days before its official release date, the album was announced through a satirical press release credited to a spokesperson named "John Miller", a reference to the name under which Donald Trump addressed reporters in the 1980s. In the press statement, Moby, under the John Miller alias, mocks himself and the album. A link was also provided, leading to a free download of both More Fast Songs About the Apocalypse and These Systems Are Failing.

On June 20, Moby released the music video for the track "In This Cold Place", directed by Steve Cutts. Much like the video for These Systems Are Failing's "Are You Lost in the World Like Me?", it is a Looney Tunes-inspired animated clip in which the album's main themes of veganism, animal rights, environmental safety, political and social issues as well as their drastic consequences are portrayed. It rapidly drew negative attention from Republican Party and Trump supporters, against whom Moby rails.

== Critical reception ==
Professional ratings
Aggregate scores
| Source | Rating |
|---|---|
| Metacritic | 63/100 |
Review scores
| Source | Rating |
| AllMusic | 3.5/5 stars |
| Classic Rock | 3/5 stars |
| PopMatters | 5/10 |
| The Spill Magazine | 4/5 stars |
| Sputnikmusic | 3.8/5 |
| Under the Radar | 5.5/10 |

At Metacritic, which assigns a normalized rating out of 100 to reviews from mainstream critics, More Fast Songs About the Apocalypse received an average score of 63, based on five reviews, which indicates "generally favorable reviews". Noting that the "shadow of the 2016 United States presidential election looms large over the project", Neil Z. Yeung of AllMusic wrote that Moby's "anger and exhaustion is palpable, so even songs about simple heartbreak and loss come packed with a gravitas borne of wider issues", ultimately calling the album "a refreshing change of pace, a frantically urgent statement that taps into the visceral with a welcome blast of noise from a voice that still has much to say."

Willim Nesbitt of PopMatters wrote a lukewarm review, crediting Moby for the stylistic shift explored on the album but adding that "like Bowie and anyone else willing to try something different, not every shot hits the target", concluding: "To some extent, it's a pastiche and collage of earlier work with its use of electronica and distorted rock/punk, but it doesn't reach the levels of the early Moby catalog that it draws from. It's neither as rough as it wants to be nor as developed as it needs to be."

== Track listing ==
All tracks are written by Moby.

| No. | Title | Length |
|---|---|---|
| 1. | "Silence" | 3:56 |
| 2. | "A Softer War" | 4:29 |
| 3. | "There's Nothing Wrong with the World, There's Something Wrong with Me" | 3:52 |
| 4. | "Trust" | 2:50 |
| 5. | "All the Hurts We Made" | 5:06 |
| 6. | "In This Cold Place" | 3:57 |
| 7. | "If Only a Correction of All We've Been" | 5:25 |
| 8. | "It's So Hard to Say Goodbye" | 3:27 |
| 9. | "A Happy Song" | 2:49 |
| Total length: | | 35:46 |

== Personnel ==
Credits for More Fast Songs About the Apocalypse adapted from album liner notes.

- Moby – production, writing, vocals
- Mindy Jones – vocals
- Gavin Lurssen – mastering
- Mark Needham – mixing
- Jonathan Nesvadba – studio assistance, technical support
- Tyler Spratt – mixing assistance

Artwork and design

- Melissa Danis – photography assistance
- Mike Jones – design
- Jonathan Nesvadba – photography assistance
- Moby – photography
