= Romeo Alaeff =

American artist (born 1970)

- Born: 1970 (age 55–56); Brooklyn, New York
- Education: Tulane University (BA); Rhode Island School of Design (MFA)
- Known for: Fine Art, Photography & Animation
- Website: romeoalaeff.com

Romeo Doron Alaeff (born 1970 in Brooklyn, New York) is an American visual artist, photographer, filmmaker, author, and animation and film editor. He is also the founder and Editor in Chief of Lines & Marks, an interview magazine, blog, and community dedicated to drawing.

== Career ==
=== Education ===
Originally studying biomedical engineering, Alaeff received a Master of Fine Arts in photography from the Rhode Island School of Design in 1996 and a BA from Tulane University in New Orleans in 1993.

=== Art ===
Alaeff's art work has been described as "blurring the boundaries between icon and art, funny and serious, traditional and experimental, public and private," and "exploring the experience of inhabiting liminal zones, those architectural spaces, psychological states, and physical states in which contradictions collide."

Alaeff published I'll be Dead by the Time You Read This: The Existential Life of Animals in 2017.

A sticker campaign was also launched from the original Evolution of Despair drawings and is featured in the book and exhibition tour, Stuck-up Piece of Crap: Stickers: From Punk Rock to Contemporary Art.

Some of Alaeff's work doesn't employ humor directly but is trained on social, psychological, or philosophical observations, such as bias in perception in his "socially and politically charged," "multicultural, complexly encoded" War on the Brain series, which consists of "gorgeously revamped Rorschach blots containing references to conflicts from William Wallace and All That to the Smell of Napalm in the morning in Vietnam." Other themes include choice, as in The Tyranny of Small Decisions, or the act of crying as a manipulative device in human discourse as well as in filmmaking. In this project, Alaeff asked different musicians such as Chi2 Strings and Moby to score the same 4 minute video of a young girl crying (singer Suzanne Santo of Honey Honey) which was then played in a loop such that each viewer had a different experience of the piece such as "pathos, anxiety, pity and, in our attempt to give meaning to such seemingly unmediated emotion, an imagined internal narrative of heartbreak at the end of summer or an accident on the highway." As a whole, Alaeff's work is meant to be interactive, speaking directly or indirectly to the viewer or allowing one's biases and projections to become part of the work.

The documentary film series, "There's no place like you" (aka "Still Life with You") is a collection of "short stories," begun in 1994 and spanning 16 years, which is devoted to Alaeff's "idiosyncratic, exuberantly complicated relatives." The series "documents the harmony and discord that typifies family dynamics." Films in the series, "Believe," "Goin' Down to Mexico," "Works Like a Dream," "All is Vanity," and "Once."

=== Bibliography ===
I'll be Dead by the Time You Read This: The Existential Life of Animals (Plume/Penguin Books)

Stuck-up Piece of Crap: Stickers: From Punk Rock to Contemporary Art. (Rizzoli)

== Exhibitions ==
Alaeff's work has exhibited nationally and internationally and has appealed to a wide range of audiences for both artistic as well as cultural interest. His work was exhibited in the 2001 Biennale in Lyon (France), Artists Space (NYC), the Kunsthal (Rotterdam), the Witte de With in conjunction w/ John Baldessari at the International Film Festival Rotterdam, Museo Nacional Centro de Arte Reina Sofía (Madrid), Barcelona Museum of Contemporary Art (MACBA, Barcelona), The Dallas Museum of Art and Fondation Cartier pour l'art contemporain (Paris).

Alaeff's work has found considerable interest with non-art audiences as well and has been included in the curriculum for Emory University’s, The Displaced Person, Literature Beyond the Canon, The University of Texas at Austin’s American Studies: Religion and Society in American Literature, and Georgia State University’s Graduate Educational Psychology Course.

In addition, Alaeff has been a guest artist, critic and teacher at the Rhode Island School of Design, Brown University, Pratt Institute, Parsons The New School for Design, The University of Georgia and Georgia State University.
