= Lie Down in Darkness =

Lie Down in Darkness may refer to:

- Lie Down in Darkness (novel), a 1951 novel by William Styron
- "Lie Down in Darkness" (A-ha song), 1993
- "Lie Down in Darkness" (Moby song), 2011
