= Pale Horses =

Pale Horses may refer to:

- Pale Horses (song), a 2009 song by Moby
- Pale Horses (album), a 2015 album by mewithoutYou
