= Be the One (Moby song) =

Single by Moby

from the album Destroyed
- Released: February 15, 2011
- Genre: Electronica
- Length: 3:29
- Label: Little Idiot; Mute
- Songwriter: Moby
- Producer: Moby

Moby singles chronology
| "Wait for Me" (2010) | "Be the One" (2011) | "The Day" (2011) |

"Be the One" is a song by American electronica musician Moby. It was released as a single and EP on February 15, 2011 in conjunction with the announcement of his tenth studio album Destroyed.

== Release ==
The Be the One EP was made available for free as a digital download on Moby's website and contains three tracks from Destroyed.

== Reception ==
"Be the One" was rated "Track of the Day" by Q on March 7, 2011.

== Music videos ==
All three songs on the EP have a music video self-shot by Moby.

"Be the One" was shot by Moby while flying from New York to Los Angeles and edited by Jo Haggis. The video features an extreme close-up of Moby singing directly into the camera while he is walking around in different locales, and reportedly represents the drudgery of touring.

"Sevastopol" was shot by Moby while flying to Brazil to DJ with Carl Cox. The video documents the trip with a first-person perspective, including shots of Moby riding in a taxi, flying in a plane, and performing at a show.

"Victoria Lucas" was shot by Moby at night in Los Angeles. The video features black and white shots of the city that move to the music with a kaleidescope-effect.

== Track listing ==
- Digital EP (IDIOT011)
1. "Be the One" – 3:29
2. "Sevastopol" – 4:21
3. "Victoria Lucas" – 5:54

== Charts ==
| Chart (2011) | Peak position |
|---|---|
| France (SNEP) | 96 |
