= Steve Cutts =

London illustrator and animator

- Born: Steve Cutts
- Occupations: Illustrator; animator

YouTube information
- Channel: Steve Cutts
- Years active: 2011–present
- Genres: Animation; commentary; satire
- Subscribers: 2.02 million
- Views: 199 million
- Last updated: 19 June 2026
- Website: www.stevecutts.com

Steve Cutts is an activist illustrator and animator based in London, England. His artwork satirises the excesses of modern society. His style is inspired by cartoons from the 1920s-1930s, as well as modern comic books and graphic novels.

== Animations ==
Before becoming a freelancer in 2012, Cutts worked as an illustrator for the London creative agency Glue Isobar. He worked on digital projects for companies including Coca-Cola, Google, Sony, and Toyota.

In 2012, Cutts created his most popular film, MAN, which has environmentalist and animal rights themes. Animated with Adobe Flash and After Effects, Cutts describes the film as "looking at man's relationship with the natural world." As of December 2024, the video has over 68 million views on YouTube. In January 2016, a Cutts couch gag for a season 27 episode of The Simpsons featured an homage to 1980s action TV shows such as Miami Vice. As of December 2023, the video has over 25 million views on YouTube.

In October 2016, a Cutts video for the song "Are You Lost in the World Like Me?" from the album These Systems Are Failing by Moby and the Void Pacific Choir addressed smartphone addiction, with Max Fleischer-inspired animation. Moby hired Cutts to create the video after being "amazed and blown away" by his MAN film. The video won the 2017 Webby Award for animation. In June 2017, Cutts illustrated another video for Moby and the Void Pacific Choir, "In This Cold Place" from the album More Fast Songs About the Apocalypse. Cutts stated that both Moby videos represent "consumerism, greed, corruption and ultimately our self-destructiveness."

In 2017, Cutts won the Jury Award at Annecy International Film Festival, the highest award which is a qualifying factor to be eligible for nomination at the Academy Awards. This was for the music video "Are You Lost in the World Like Me?" In 2018 for the second-year running, Cutts was the Webby Award Winner in the Film & Video Animation Category for original cartoons, motion graphics, illustrations or digitally animated images premiered on the Internet.

Cutts made Ridley Scott's curated list of just 12 for the New Directors' Showcase at the Cannes Lions International Festival of Creativity in June 2018. Of the final reel, Scott said: "The range of the work submitted this year has been remarkable. We've taken great care to ensure that the 2018 reel not only reflects great ideas but also considered craft and production."
