= The Day (Moby song) =

Single by Moby

from the album Destroyed
- Released: May 9, 2011
- Recorded: 2009–2011
- Genre: Electronica
- Length: 4:31
- Label: Little Idiot; Mute
- Songwriter: Moby
- Producer: Moby

Moby singles chronology
"Be the One" (2011)	"The Day" (2011)	"Lie Down in Darkness" (2011)

Music video
- "Moby 'The Day' Official video featuring Heather Graham" on YouTube

"The Day" is a song by American electronica musician Moby, from his tenth studio album Destroyed (2011). It was released as the album's second single on May 9, 2011.

== Background ==
Moby talked about the track on his website blog, saying "'The Day' was written in a hotel room in Spain at dawn when I hadn't slept. It was a beautiful hotel room, a beautiful perfect hotel room and it was six or seven in the morning. I wrote it on an acoustic guitar and recorded it on my phone, brought it home and re-recorded it with old broken down electronics that I have in my studio".

The track is a return to a more electronic sound than his last album Wait for Me. Moby says it was inspired by David Bowie and Brian Eno's production "circa Low and Heroes".

Before the release of the song, the basic track is offered to the French singer Mylène Farmer for her song "Bleu Noir" in 2010. These two songs both use this similar backing track ("Bleu Noir" was also produced by Moby).

== Release ==
"The Day" was first released in advance on April 2, 2011 on the iTunes Store. The song was officially released as a single bundled with remixes on May 9.

The release of this song few weeks after Mylène Farmer's "Bleu Noir" created a little controversy amongst fans of Farmer, as many of them criticized the fact that he gave the music to the songstress and then reappropriated it for his own album. In an interview published on 18 May 2011 in the Belgian newspaper Le Soir, Moby said he was very embarrassed and deemed the release of "The Day" as a single an "error", since Farmer was disappointed, thinking "it was her song".

== Music video ==
On April 21, 2011, Moby released the song's video, directed by Evan Bernard. The video stars Heather Graham as a beautiful angel who slays demons in a hospital. The video is intercut with patients lying in bed, as well as Moby singing the song as other people lie on the ceiling.

== Legacy ==
The song appears in the 2013 film Trance.

== Track listing ==
- Digital single – remixes
1. "The Day" – 4:32
2. "The Day" (radio edit) – 3:33
3. "The Day" (Gesaffelstein Remix) – 4:19
4. "The Day" (Lifelike Remix) – 6:47
5. "The Day" (Funkerman Remix) – 6:00
6. "The Day" (Basto! Remix) – 6:31
7. "The Day" (Uhlenhorst Remix) – 7:15
8. "The Day" (J.Viewz Remix) – 4:50
- Digital single – remixes (IDIOT012BP1)
1. "The Day" (Lifelike Remix) – 6:47
2. "The Day" (Gesaffelstein Remix) – 4:19
3. "The Day" (Funkerman Remix) – 6:00
4. "Victoria Lucas" (Sasha Remix) – 9:18
- Digital single – remixes (IDIOT012BP2)
1. "The Day" (Basto! Remix) – 6:31
2. "The Day" (Uhlenhorst Remix) – 7:15
3. "The Day" (Eddie Thoneick Remix) – 7:34
- Digital single – remixes (IDIOT013)
1. "The Day" (Yeasayer Remix) – 4:48
2. "The Day" (Kraak & Smaak Remix) – 6:29
3. "Sevastopol" (John Lord Fonda Cathedral Mix) – 5:12
