= Parlovr =

- Origin: Montreal, Quebec, Canada
- Genre: indie rock
- Years active: 2007–2013
- Label: Dine Alone Records
- Members: Alex Cooper; Louis David Jackson; Jeremy McCuish
- Website: parlovr.bandcamp.com

Parlovr (pronounced "parlour" or "parlover") was a Canadian indie rock band. Based in Montreal, Quebec, the band consisted of vocalist and keyboardist Alex Cooper, vocalist and guitarist Louis David Jackson, and drummer Jeremy McCuish.

== History ==
Parlovr released its self-titled debut album independently in 2008 before signing to Dine Alone Records, which re-released it in 2010, concurrently with the EP Hell/Heaven/Big/Love. They toured Canada, the US, Europe, and China in support of the album, and then took some time off.

In 2010, The Parlovr song "All the World Is All That Is the Case" was used in the soundtrack for an episode of Degrassi: The Next Generation.

In 2012, Parlovr followed up with its second album, Kook Soul. Kook Soul, with its dance-friendly beat and soulful lyrics, was a long-listed nominee for the 2012 Polaris Music Prize on June 14, 2012.

In 2013, Cooper formed the band Mori; Jackson and McCuish formed the band Nanimal.

== Discography ==
=== Albums ===
- Parlovr (2008), Independent
- Hell/Heaven/Big/Love (2010), Dine Alone Records
- Kook Soul (2012), Dine Alone Records

=== Singles ===
Year	Song	Chart peak	Album
Year	Song	CAN Alt	Album
2012	"You Only Want it 'Cause You're Lonely"	36	Kook Soul
"—" denotes a release that did not chart.
