= Neuroplasticity (album) =

Studio album by Cold Specks
- Released: August 25, 2014 (world); August 26, 2014 (US and Canada)
- Recorded: 2013–2014
- Genres: Soul music; Goth rock
- Length: 34:47
- Labels: Mute Records; Arts & Crafts Productions (Canada)
- Producer: Jim Anderson

Cold Specks chronology
I Predict a Graceful Expulsion (2012)	Neuroplasticity (2014)	Fool's Paradise (2017)

Neuroplasticity is the second album by Cold Specks. "Absisto" is the album's first single. "Bodies at Bay" is the album's second single.

The album was a long-listed nominee for the 2015 Polaris Music Prize.

== Track listing ==
1. A Broken Memory
2. Bodies at Bay
3. Old Knives
4. A Quiet Chill
5. Exit Plan (featuring Michael Gira)
6. Let Loose the Dogs
7. Absisto
8. Living Signs
9. A Formal Invitation
10. A Season of Doubt
