= Yamantaka // Sonic Titan =

Canadian experimental music and performance art collective

- Origin: Montreal, Quebec, Canada
- Genres: Experimental, progressive rock
- Years active: 2007–present
- Labels: Psychic Handshake, Paper Bag, Suicide Squeeze
- Members: alaska B Joanna Delos Reyes; Hiroki Tanaka; Ange Loft; Brendan Swanson; Aylwin Lo; Brandon Lim
- Past members: Ruby Kato Attwood; John Ancheta; Walter Scott; Shub Roy; Alana Ruth; Daniel Ellis; Chase Lo

Yamantaka // Sonic Titan is a Canadian experimental music and performance art collective. Formed in Montreal, Quebec and currently operating in Toronto, Ontario, the group was founded by Ruby Kato Attwood and alaska B – former members of the defunct Montreal noise rock band Lesbian Fight Club – and now features Ange Loft on vocals and percussion, Joanna Delos Reyes on vocals and guitar, Brendan Swanson on keyboards, Hiroki Tanaka on lead guitar, Brandon Lim on bass guitar, and Aylwin Lo on projections and lights. Ruby Kato Attwood left the band at the end of 2014. Past members have included John Ancheta on bass and acoustic guitar, Walter Scott, Shub Roy, Alana Ruth, and Adrienne Mak.

The group was originally conceived of as an art project exploring and subverting the cultural signifiers of their shared Asian Canadian heritage through the lens of their own mixed Asian-European heritage. They developed a music and performance style incorporating aspects of Asian C-pop and J-pop, progressive rock, heavy metal and industrial music, with roots in Haudenosaunee and First Nations culture, as well as Buddhist philosophy, anime and manga, Chinese opera and Kabuki and Noh theatre.

They present two distinct versions of their work, one conceptualized as a large scale theatrical performance art project and one recast as a touring rock band, describing their style as "Noh-wave", a pun on Noh theatre and the No Wave style of experimental underground music. Their first theatrical work, a drag rock opera called 33, premiered at Toronto's Buddies in Bad Times theatre as part of the 2012 Rhubarb Festival, while their rock band show has appeared at several venues in 2012, including the All Tomorrow's Parties and NXNE festivals.

The first album, YT//ST, was released on Montreal independent label Psychic Handshake in 2011. It was shortlisted for the 2012 Polaris Music Prize, and appeared on the !earshot Campus and Community National Top 50 Albums chart in January, 2012. The album was re-released on Paper Bag Records in 2012. Their video for "Hoshi Neko" was a shortlisted nominee for the Prism Prize in 2013.

Their second album, UZU, was released on October 29, 2013, and was a shortlisted nominee for the 2014 Polaris Music Prize.

In 2016, in collaboration with Pantayo, the band scored the soundtrack for the video game Severed.

In January 2018, the band announced DIRT, their third album, which was released on March 23, 2018, via Paper Bag Records. The band had a five-week North American tour in March and April, and a European tour in June. DIRT was longlisted for the 2018 Polaris Music Prize.

In October and November 2018 the band embarked on "North American Tour II: The Dirtening", as well as another European run. The band is scheduled to open every show of Acid Mothers Temple's spring 2019 tour of Canada and the United States.

In 2018, Alaska B composed the score to the film Through Black Spruce with Brendan Swanson as arranger, assistant composer and pianist. She won the Canadian Screen Award for Best Original Score at the 7th Canadian Screen Awards in 2019.

== Discography ==
- YT//ST (Psychic Handshake/Paper Bag Records, 2011)
- UZU (Suicide Squeeze Records/Paper Bag Records/ATP Recordings, 2013)
- DIRT (Paper Bag Records, 2018)
