= Julie Mintz =

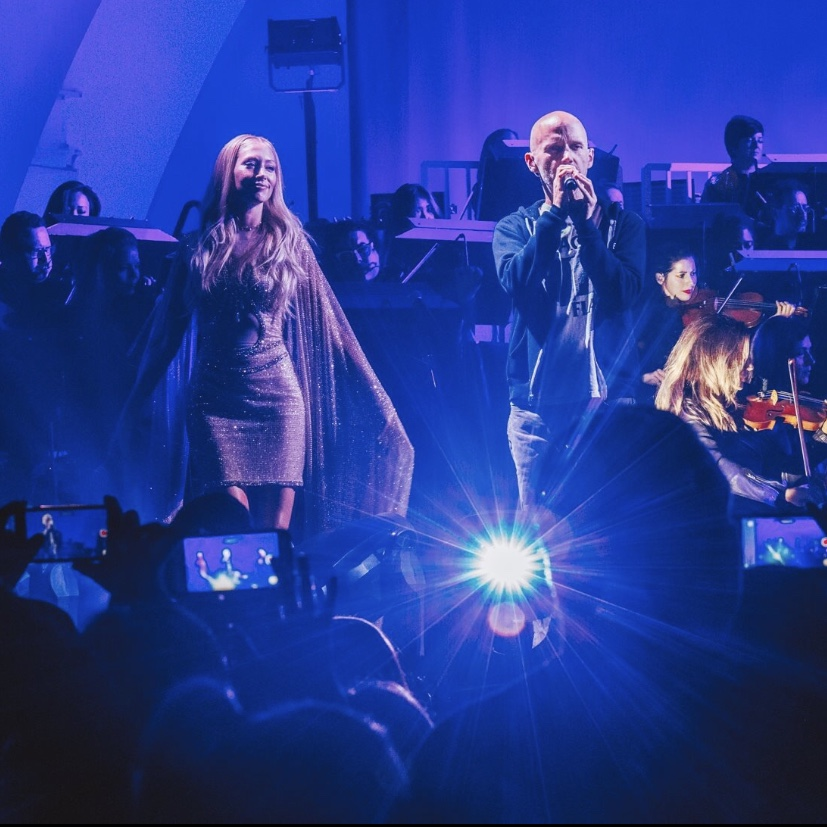
- Julie Mintz (left) performs with Moby (right) at the Hollywood Bowl in Los Angeles, California

Background information
- Born: Julie Sarah Mintz; Corpus Christi, Texas
- Genres: Southern Gothic, Alt-Country, Indie Folk, Dream Pop, Americana music
- Occupations: Actress, singer-songwriter
- Instruments: vocals, guitar, piano, ukulele, dulcimer
- Labels: Manimal Vinyl, Daughters of Cain Records
- Website: Official website

Julie Mintz is an American alternative singer-songwriter and actress. The south Texas-born Los Angeles-based singer-songwriter joined Moby's band as a backup singer and keyboardist in 2011. In 2015, Moby produced her debut EP "The Thin Veil" culled from a collection of over fifty songs Mintz had written before joining his band. The sound has been described as Gothic Americana, while Entertainment Weekly calls Mintz's music "an elegant and bewitching blend of Americana and orchestral pop that sits somewhere between Gillian Welch and Lana Del Rey."

== Early life ==
Julie Mintz was born and raised in Corpus Christi, Texas the daughter of Michael Mintz, an otolaryngologist [ENT] and head and neck surgeon and Laurie Mintz (née Isenberg), a former beauty queen (Miss Michigan) and high school English teacher. She is the middle child amongst two older brothers, a younger sister, and younger brother in a Jewish family of Belarusian descent.

Mintz studied classical piano from the age of five. She also sang in choir and performed in ballet and musical theater productions throughout her childhood.

She graduated valedictorian of her class at W.B. Ray High School in Corpus Christi, Texas and earned a National Merit Scholarship.

Her songwriting is deeply informed by her first after-school job: working at a cemetery and funeral home on the Gulf of Mexico, which included driving a hearse with a body in the back. Mintz recalls, “I was a cheerleader in high school, so I used to show up to work at the funeral home in my cheerleading uniform. At the time it was all really scary to me, but I think it ties into me eventually writing this very Gothic music, and this thread throughout my songs about the idea of dying alone.”

Mintz graduated early from Emory University in Atlanta, Georgia with a Bachelor of Science Degree in Neuroscience and Behavioral Biology.

While working in an Oncology ward at Atlanta's Grady Hospital, she began suffering from severe anxiety. This led to her decision to forego medical school, and she began playing music again.

== Career ==
=== Early career ===
On a summer break from college, Mintz booked her first professional acting role in the Tobe Hooper film, Crocodile.

Mintz earned her degree in Neuroscience and Behavioral Biology in three years and graduated early from Emory University in order to move to Los Angeles full-time. As a means to support her music career, she worked as a private math and English tutor and acted in film, television, and national commercials.

She has sung and appeared in over 30 national advertisements for brands such as Gap, Heineken, Mercedes, AT&T, Target, American Airlines, Coors Light, and Sprint and an advertisement directed by Academy Award winning cinematographer Wally Pfister.

Mintz has written songs on piano since childhood, but it was during this time that she bought herself a Gibson J-300 and began composing on guitar. While Mintz honed her songwriting, her years as an actress saw her working on films directed by Martin Brest and Spike Lee and acting opposite Christopher Walken, Rosanna Arquette, and Ryan Gosling.

=== Music career ===
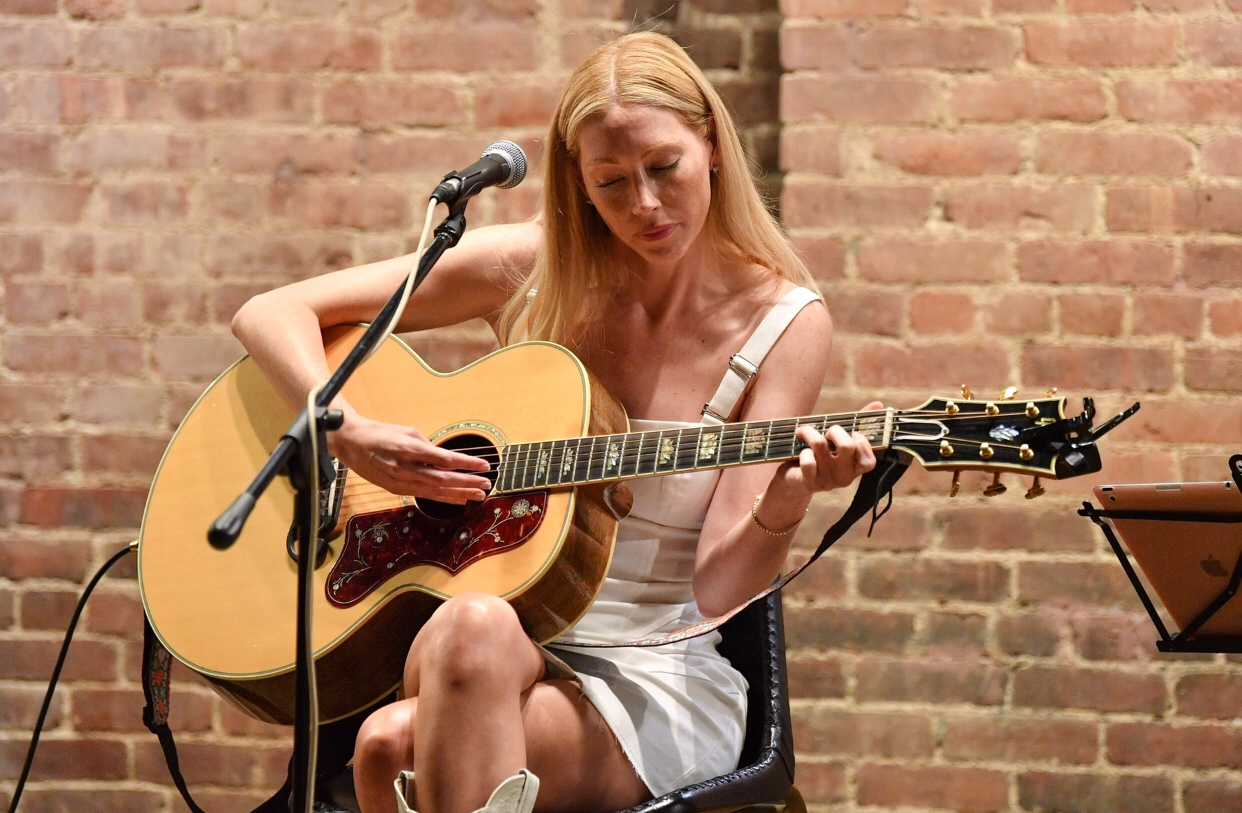
Mintz performing at So Far Sounds in Manhattan, New York.

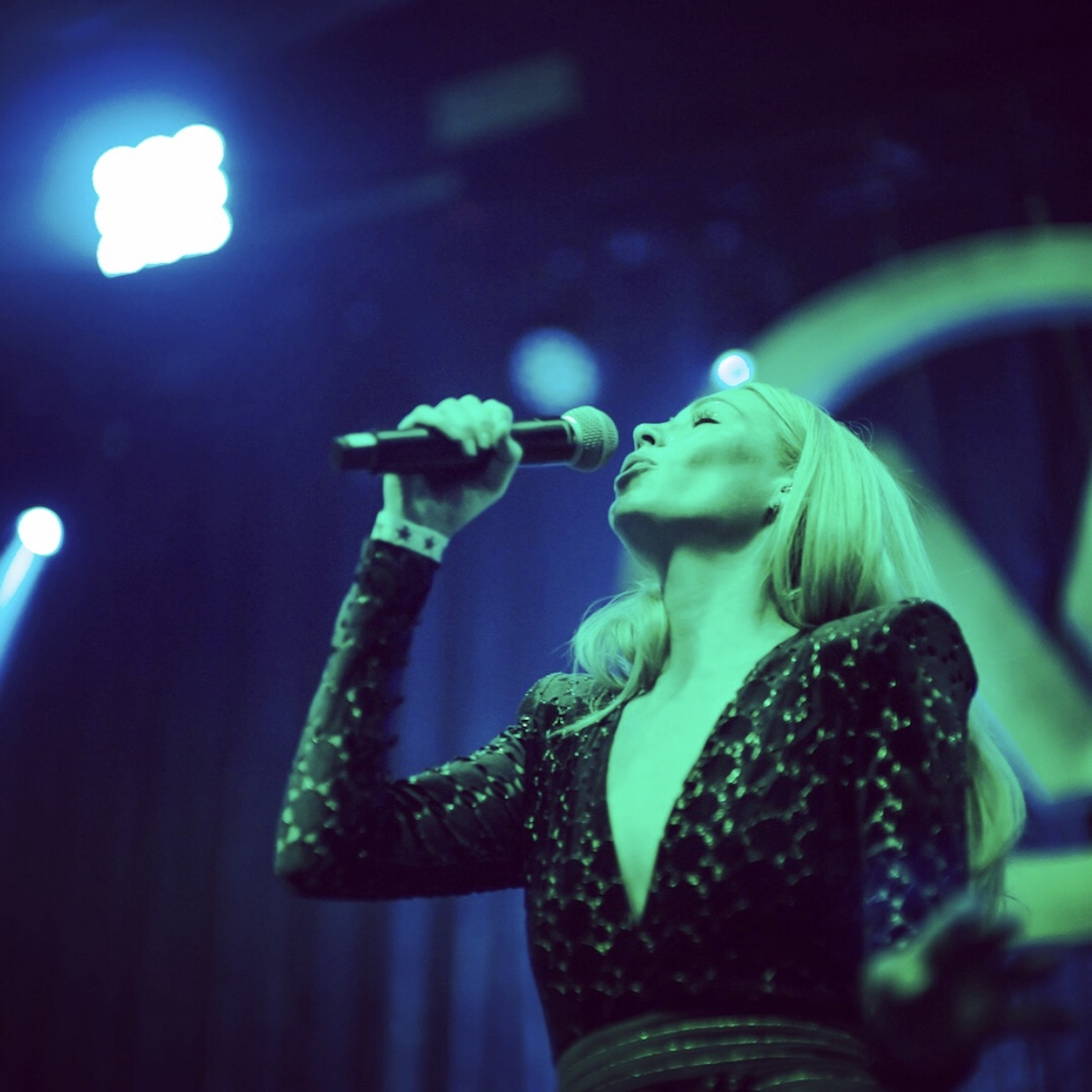
Mintz singing at Circle V Festival

Mintz's original song "Over" was used in an episode of the J. J. Abrams television series What About Brian. She appeared in the episode, "What About Denial", singing and playing the song on acoustic guitar. In 2010, her song "Fight the Good Fight" and her cover of Leonard Cohen's "Hallelujah" were used in the independent film The Putt Putt Syndrome.

Mintz sings back-up, session vocals, and plays keyboards for multi-platinum recording artist Moby.

In April 2011, Julie Mintz appeared on The Tonight Show with Jay Leno as musical support for Moby performing his single "The Day" from his album Destroyed .

In June 2013, Mintz began recording an album of original Gothic Americana alt-country folk songs with live tracking engineered by Darrell Thorp (seven-time Grammy winner; Beck's Morning Phase, Radiohead), mixed by Michael Patterson (The Girl with the Dragon Tattoo (soundtrack) and The Social Network), and produced by Moby.

In September 2013, Mintz appeared on Conan playing keyboards and singing background vocals with Moby performing his single "The Perfect Life" from his album Innocents.

Mintz contributed lead vocals to "I Tried," a bonus track on the Deluxe version of Moby's 11th studio album, Innocents, released on October 1, 2013.

Mintz has performed live with Camp Freddy, featuring Mintz on vocals along with Dave Navarro on guitar, Billy Morrison on guitar, Donovan Leitch, Matt Sorum on drums, and Chris Chaney on bass. Leitch is also married to Mintz's younger sister, actress Libby Mintz.

Julie Mintz and Moby duet lead vocals on the beat-driven single "The Only Thing" which Moby wrote for the Paul Haggis film Third Person. The single along with a music video were released on June 26, 2014. Featured in the music video are Mintz and Moby, who filmed each other for their parts, as well as the stars of the film Liam Neeson, Mila Kunis, Maria Bello, Adrien Brody, James Franco, and Olivia Wilde.

Julie Mintz was the opening support act for Moby and also sang with him during his set in a series of ambient shows at the Masonic Lodge at The Hollywood Forever Cemetery in December 2014.

Mintz's debut five song EP, "The Thin Veil," produced by Moby was released jointly on Manimal Vinyl Records (Warpaint, Bat for Lashes) and her own record label, Daughters of Cain Records, on May 5, 2015.

In October 2016, Mintz appeared on Conan playing keyboards and singing background vocals with Moby performing his single "Are You Lost in the World Like Me" from his album These Systems Are Failing.

In November 2017, Mintz performed at The Hollywood Bowl with Moby and Pete Tong.

On March 19, 2018, Mintz appeared on "The Late Show with Stephen Colbert" on keyboards and background vocals with Moby performing his single "This Wild Darkness" from his album "Everything Was Beautiful and Nothing Hurt".

On October 5, 2018 Mintz independently released her debut album Abandon All Hope of Fruition on her label Daughters of Cain Records.

On August 16, 2019 Mintz released a single "Purple Rain/Millions Reasons" on her label Daughters of Cain Records and Manimal Vinyl.

On March 27, 2020 Mintz released a remix by Moby of her "Purple Rain/Million Reasons" single, "Purple Rain/Million Reasons (Minimal Remix)" on her label Daughters of Cain Records and Manimal Vinyl.

Mintz sang lead vocals on the end credits song "Eve of Destruction" for the film Run Hide Fight released in 2020.

On March 10, 2021 Mintz independently released a cover of the Beatles "Revolution" produced by Moby on her label Daughters of Cain Records.

On May 18, 2021, Mintz appeared on "The Late Late Show with James Corden" singing background vocals supporting Moby performing "Natural Blues" with Apollo Jane and the Pacific Northwest Ballet Orchestra.

In September 2024, Mintz toured the United Kingdom and Europe as keyboard player and backing vocalist with Moby as part of his Play 25th Anniversary Tour, with performances in Manchester, London at the O2 Arena, Antwerp, Berlin, Düsseldorf, and Paris, and Lausanne.

As of 2025, Mintz was working on various new music projects to be released through her Daughters of Cain Records label.

In April 2026, she performed at the Coachella Valley Music and Arts Festival both weekends on the Mojave stage as part of Moby's band.

== Personal life ==
In May 2025, Mintz and her partner welcomed their daughter, Ophelia Laurette, via surrogacy, following a nearly 14-year fertility journey that included 10 failed rounds of IVF, a rare fatal genetic disease diagnosis, and a laboratory error. Ophelia was conceived from an egg Mintz had frozen in 2011. Mintz and her partner subsequently partnered with the BabyQuest Foundation to establish a grant supporting other families in need of fertility treatments.

== Advocacy ==
Mintz is a trained Court Appointed Special Advocate (CASA) volunteer, working one-on-one with a child in the foster care system. Sworn in by a dependency court judge, with legal standing to fully investigate a child's circumstances, CASA volunteers make recommendations to the court on how best to serve and support the neglected child.

Mintz volunteered for two years as a Wish Coordinator for the Make-A-Wish Foundation, which serves children with life-threatening illnesses.

As a musician, she has performed in support of The Humane Society, Mercy For Animals,Emily's List, The Brady Campaign to Prevent Gun Violence, Adopt the Arts, and Al Gore's Climate Reality Project.

== Musical Influences ==
Joni Mitchell, Patty Griffin, June Carter Cash, Dolly Parton, and Emmylou Harris.

== Ultimate Discography ==
- The Thin Veil (2015)
- Abandon All Hope of Fruition (2018)
