= Cannon Bros. =

Canadian indie pop band

Cannon Bros. are a Canadian indie pop group from Winnipeg, Manitoba, consisting of Cole Woods and Alannah Walker. They are most noted for their 2011 album Firecracker/Cloudglow, which was longlisted for the 2012 Polaris Music Prize.

== History ==
Childhood friends since elementary school, Woods and Walker formed their first band, The Playing Cards, in grade 8. In that form, they played at least one show in Winnipeg as an opening act for Great Lake Swimmers, and were later active as supporting musicians for singer-songwriter Greg MacPherson before reforming as Cannon Bros. They released their debut EP in 2010.

In 2011, the Cannon Bros released an album, Firecracker/Cloudglow. The album appeared on the !earshot National Top 50 Albums chart in January 2012.

They followed up with the album Dream City in 2015. This album also received significant airplay on campus and community radio, and appeared on the !earshot National Top 50 Chart in December that year. The band continued performing in Winnipeg in 2016.
