= 2012 Polaris Music Prize =

Annual Canadian music award ceremony

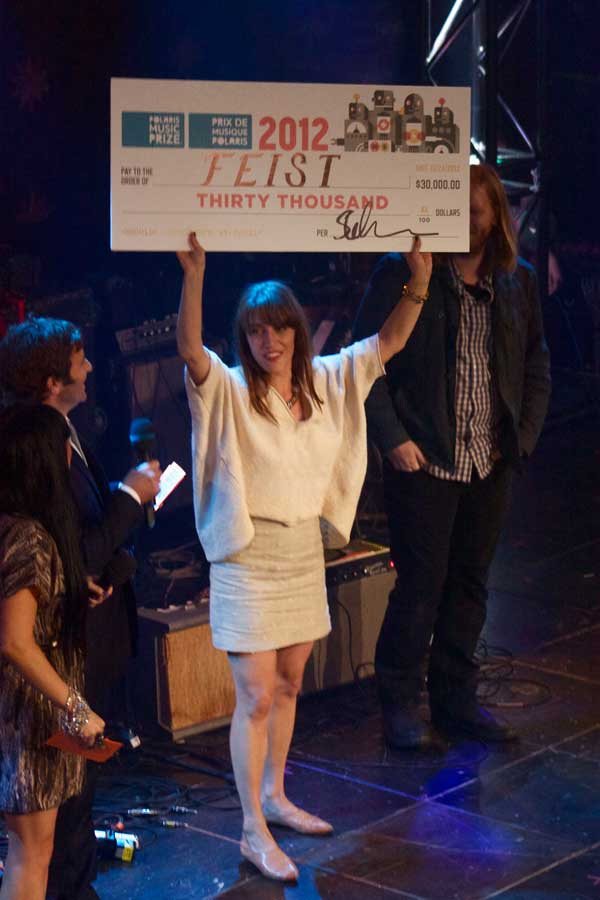
Feist accepts $ 30,000 cheque for her prize winning album "Metals" at The Polaris Gala in Toronto, 2010

The 2012 edition of the Canadian Polaris Music Prize was presented on September 24, 2012 at Toronto's Masonic Temple.

The award was won by Feist for her album Metals.

== Shortlist ==
The 10-album shortlist was revealed on July 17, 2012.

- Feist, Metals
- Cadence Weapon, Hope in Dirt City
- Cold Specks, I Predict a Graceful Expulsion
- Drake, Take Care
- Kathleen Edwards, Voyageur
- Fucked Up, David Comes to Life
- Grimes, Visions
- Handsome Furs, Sound Kapital
- Japandroids, Celebration Rock
- Yamantaka // Sonic Titan, YT//ST

== Longlist ==
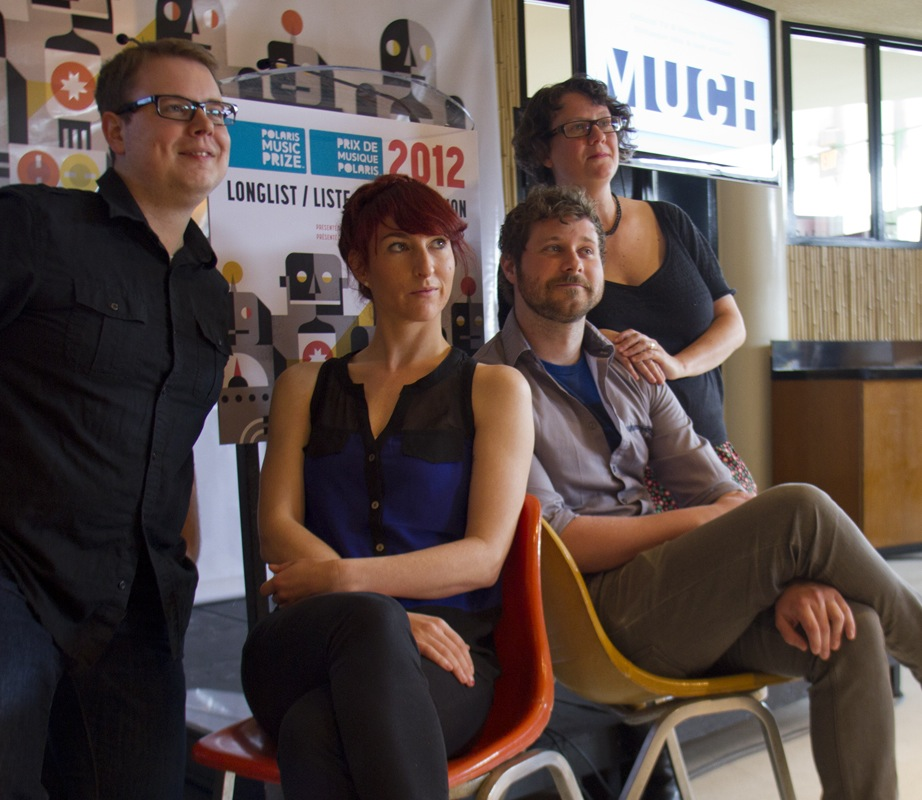
The presenters of the longlist; from left to right, Francois Marchand, Hannah Georgas, Dan Mangan and Veda Hille.

The prize's preliminary 40-album longlist was announced on June 14 at The Waldorf Hotel in Vancouver.

- A Tribe Called Red, A Tribe Called Red
- Marie-Pierre Arthur, Aux alentours
- Rich Aucoin, We're All Dying to Live
- Avec pas d'casque, Astronomie
- Azari & III, Azari & III
- Bahamas, Barchords
- The Barr Brothers, The Barr Brothers
- Blackie and the Rodeo Kings, Kings and Queens
- Cadence Weapon, Hope in Dirt City
- Kathryn Calder, Bright and Vivid
- Cannon Bros., Firecracker/Cloudglow
- Cœur de pirate, Blonde
- Leonard Cohen, Old Ideas
- Cold Specks, I Predict a Graceful Expulsion
- Rose Cousins, We Have Made a Spark
- Mark Davis, Eliminate the Toxins
- Drake, Take Care
- Kathleen Edwards, Voyageur
- Fucked Up, David Comes to Life
- Feist, Metals
- Great Lake Swimmers, New Wild Everywhere
- Grimes, Visions
- Handsome Furs, Sound Kapital
- Japandroids, Celebration Rock
- Dan Mangan, Oh Fortune
- Mares of Thrace, The Pilgrimage
- Ariane Moffatt, MA
- Lindi Ortega, Little Red Boots
- Parlovr, Kook Soul
- Sandro Perri, Impossible Spaces
- Joel Plaskett Emergency, Scrappy Happiness
- PS I Love You, Death Dreams
- John K. Samson, Provincial
- Shooting Guns, Born to Deal in Magic: 1952-1976
- The Slakadeliqs, The Other Side of Tomorrow
- Patrick Watson, Adventures in Your Own Backyard
- Bry Webb, Provider
- The Weeknd, Echoes of Silence
- Yamantaka // Sonic Titan, YT//ST
- Yukon Blonde, Tiger Talk
