= YT//ST =

Studio album by Yamantaka // Sonic Titan
- Released: October 1, 2011
- Recorded: The Glory Hole; Toronto, CA
- Genre: Progressive rock
- Length: 31:04
- Label: Psychic Handshake; Suicide Squeeze; Paper Bag Records

Yamantaka // Sonic Titan chronology
YT//ST (2011)	UZU (2013)

Professional ratings
Review scores
Source	Rating
Allmusic	4/5 stars
Consequence of Sound	4/5 stars
Exclaim!	positive
NOW	NNNN
Pitchfork	8.2/10
Sputnikmusic	4.7/5

YT//ST is the first studio album by Canadian experimental band Yamantaka // Sonic Titan.

It was initially released independently on October 1, 2011, through Psychic Handshake and later released through Canadian label Paper Bag Records on September 11, 2012, and on American label Suicide Squeeze Records on July 16, 2013.

Tracks from YT//ST were originally written for the soundtrack to the group's rock opera titled 33, but were condensed during the album's recording process to accommodate their budget to record up to thirty minutes of music.

Most of the album was recorded in Alaska B.'s basement, Glory Hole, the band's studio headquarters in Toronto, CA. Vocals for A Star Over Pureland were recorded in guitarist John Ancheta's painting studio.

The album cover depicts the head of Blastro, "a giant plant with his brain blown out who flies through space and he’s completely braindead", "rising out of this meat goo sea of bones" into a black hole.

The group released a music video for the YT//ST album track "Hoshi Neko" which was co-directed by Ruby Kato Attwood and Emily Pelstring.

YT//ST was among the shortlist nominee albums for the 2012 Polaris Music Prize.

== Track listing ==
No.	Title	Length
1.	"Raccoon Song"	1:09
2.	"Queens"	3:49
3.	"Oak of Guernica"	2:43
4.	"Reverse Crystal//Murder of a Spider"	6:40
5.	"Hoshi Neko"	4:42
6.	"A Star Over Pureland"	6:59
7.	"Crystal Fortress Over the Sea of Trees"	5:02
Total length:		31:04

== Personnel ==
YT//ST album personnel adapted from Allmusic.

- Alaska B. – drums, engineer, keyboards, programming, sampling
- Ange Loft – vocals
- Brendan Swanson – organ, synthesizer
- John Ancheta – bass, acoustic guitar
- Ruby Kato Attwood – vocals
- Shub Roy – electric guitar
- Walter K. Scott – vocals
