= Ange Loft =

Mohawk interdisciplinary performing artist

- Born: Kanien'kehá:ka Kahnawà:ke, Canada
- Known for: Performance art, visual art
- Awards: Living Lands Fellowship, Canadian Centre for Architecture; Indigenous Artist Award, Toronto Arts Foundation
- Website: www.angeloft.ca/about

Ange Loft is a Kanien'kehá:ka (Mohawk) Canadian interdisciplinary performing artist who is from Kahnawà:ke, Canada. She lives in Tsi Tkarón:to (Toronto), Canada.

== Career ==
Loft's arts-based research projects, collaborations and theatrical co-creations with other artists use voice, instrumentation and wearable sculpture to explore Haudenosaunee history and produce community-engaged spectacles.

Her work has been presented internationally with Yamantaka // Sonic Titan, a no-wave music and performance collective that acts as an "interpreter of Indigenous-lead theatrical narrative, experimental composition and performance." Her installation and video work with the Jumblies Theater incorporated objects and materials, including kettles, hats, rum and flannel cloth that the British gave to the Mississaugas of the Credit First Nation people in the Toronto Purchase to buy their ancestral lands.

Loft has exhibited her work in the Toronto Biennial of Art at Arsenal Contemporary Art and the Museum of Contemporary Art, Toronto, among other venues.

The Canadian Centre for Architecture invited Loft as the inaugural Research Fellow for Indigenous researchers, to develop work on land restitution in Tiohtià:ke/Mooniyang/Montréal, resulting in an installation, Visibly Iroquoian, dealing with Indigenous presence, relationality and place-making.

She has worked as an advisor the to Toronto Biennial to develop the Toronto Indigeous Context Brief, a document on land acknowledgment that carefully considers place-and-space, land, geographic boundaries and historical land-use in Toronto.

Loft teaches at the Centre for Indigenous Theatre in Toronto. In 2018, she worked with the City of Toronto to establish the Indigenous Arts and Culture Partnership Fund. She also directs the Talking Treaties Initiative of the Jumblies Theatre, where she is also the associate artistic director.

== Awards and honors ==
In 2021–2022, Loft received a biennial fellowship from Living Lands in partnership with the Canadian Centre for Architecture. In 2023 she received the Toronto Arts Foundation's Indigenous Artist Award.
