= Kelli Scarr =

American singer and songwriter

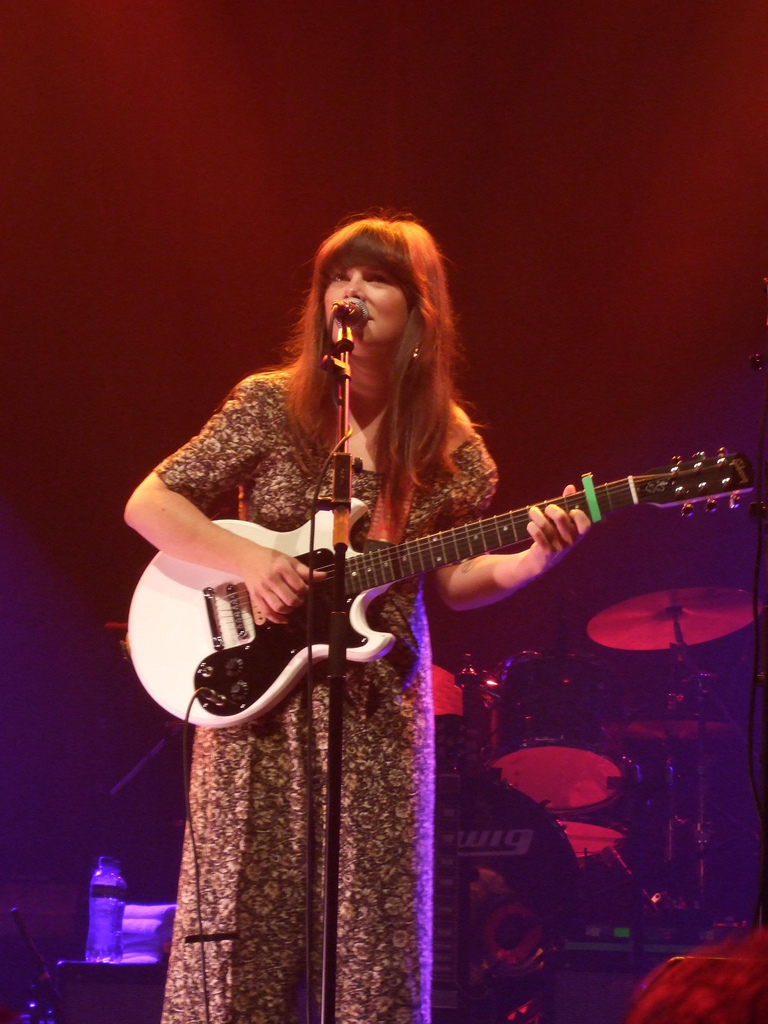
- Kelli Scarr playing at Melkweg, July 14, 2009

Background information
- Genres: Alternative, Jazz, Independent
- Instruments: Piano, Guitar, Vocals
- Labels: Vera Jean Music, Silence Breaks
- Website: www.kelliscarr.com

Kelli Scarr is an Emmy-nominated composer, producer, multi-instrumentalist, and singer. She was featured on Moby's album Wait for Me, and collaborated with him on National Public Radio's "Project Song", resulting in the track "Gone to Sleep".

Scarr was nominated for an Emmy Award for her work on the HBO documentary In a Dream.

== Early life ==
Born and raised in Northern California, Scarr grew up in a musical family and started singing with her grandmother before she could walk. She spent much of her youth singing in choirs and had performed at the Montreux, North Sea, and Monterey Jazz Festivals by the age of 16. She went on to study jazz performance on a scholarship at the Berklee College of Music.

== Musical career ==
While at Berklee, Scarr joined the band Moonraker. After the band's breakup in 2005, she was involved in writing the soundtrack for the HBO documentary In a Dream. She was subsequently nominated for an Emmy Award for the In a Dream score.

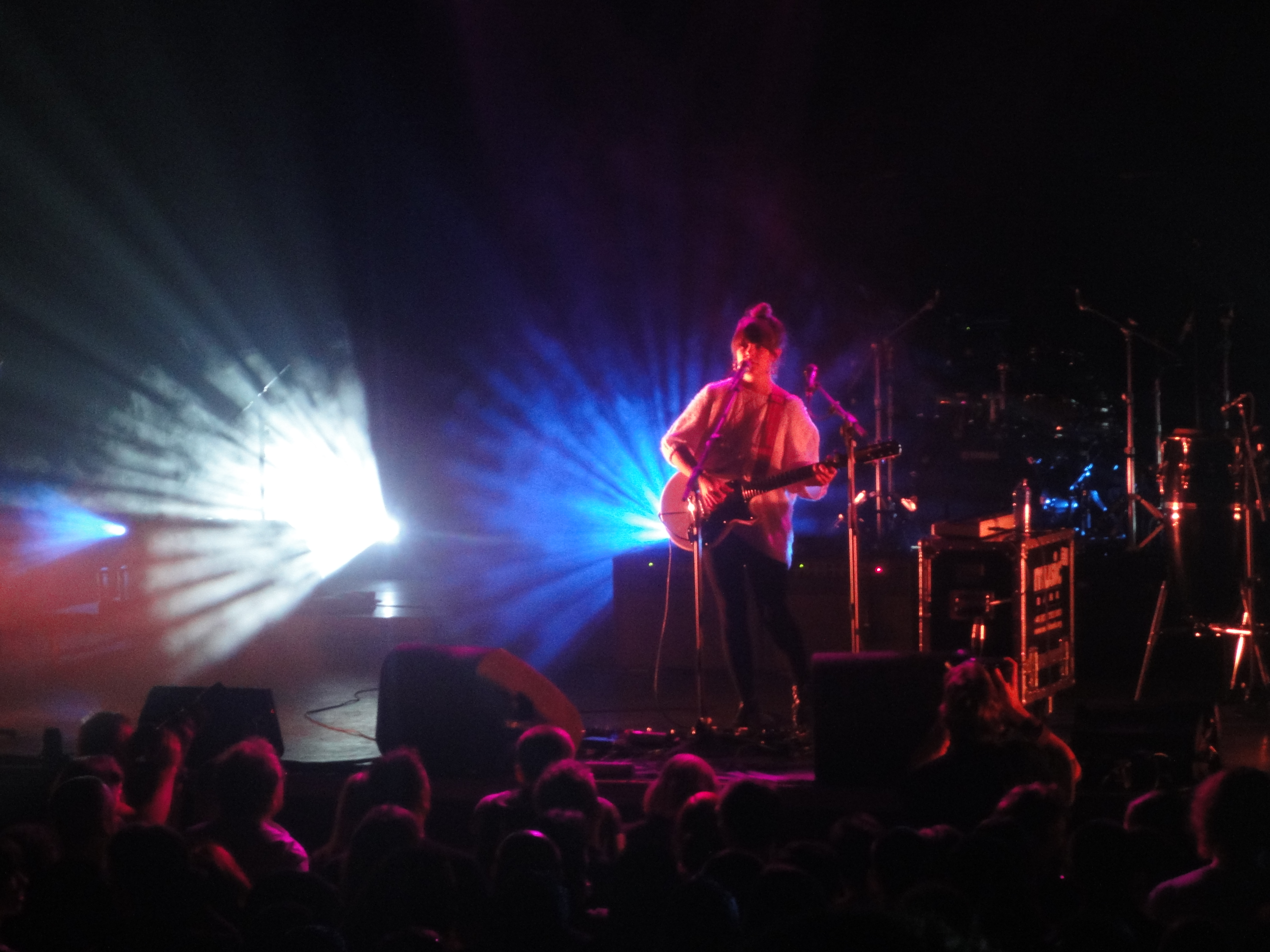
Scarr performing as the warm-up act to Moby in 2009

In 2009, Scarr met Moby, who asked her to sing vocals for his album Wait for Me. Scarr subsequently toured with Moby for 15 months, both singing with him and opening shows with her own material. Scarr also collaborated with Moby on his appearance on National Public Radio's "Project Song" on May 4, 2010, a challenge for musicians to write a song in no more than 48 hours. Moby and Scarr were able to write the song "Gone to Sleep" in little more than a day, a feat not accomplished by any previous musicians in this challenge. Moby and Scarr had enough time left to record three versions of the song and to perform a short concert for NPR staff.

Scarr's first album, entitled Piece, was released by Silence Breaks on August 21, 2010. NPR reviewed the album favorably, calling it "enchanting" and noting that the tone of voice created the illusion of the singer being in the room.

Her second album, Dangling Teeth, was released was released by Silence Breaks on September 28, 2013. "Kelli Scarr's new record, Dangling Teeth, is basically a country record. There are still wisps of dreaminess, but she and her talented band are playing songs that sit well on my record shelf next to Neil Young's Harvest."

In 2016, Scarr performed vocals with J.Viewz in the interactive song "Almost Forgot".

In 2021, Scarr released her album No Rush on the label Vera Jean Music. The first single, "Eve of Spring", was featured on NPR's All Songs Considered.
