= Destroyed (Moby album) =

Studio album by Moby
- Released: May 13, 2011
- Recorded: 2009–2011
- Genre: Electronic
- Length: 71:39
- Label: Little Idiot; Mute
- Producer: Moby

Moby chronology
Wait for Me. Remixes! (2010)	Destroyed (2011)	Innocents (2013)

Singles from Destroyed
- 1. "Be the One" Released: February 15, 2011; 2. "The Day" Released: May 9, 2011; 3. "Lie Down in Darkness" Released: August 15, 2011; 4. "After" Released: November 21, 2011; 5. "The Right Thing" Released: December 13, 2011; 6. "The Poison Tree" Released: May 1, 2012

Destroyed (stylized as destroyed.) is the tenth studio album by American electronica musician Moby, released on May 13, 2011, by record labels Little Idiot and Mute.

A photography book of the same name was released in conjunction with the album. The album was Moby's lowest-charting album to date, and received a generally mixed response from music critics.

== Recording ==
The majority of the recording was done while Moby was touring. He would stay up in his hotel room because of insomnia and work on music during the late night. He has said: "it seemed as if everyone else in the world is sleeping." He would take any incomplete tracks back to his apartment and finish them using his collection of unique instruments. His friends Emily Zuzik, Inyang Bassey, and Joy Malcolm, as well as Moby himself, sang on the record.

== Content ==
Musically, Moby has summed the record up as being "broken-down melodic electronic music for empty cities at 2 am." He has stated that the album makes the most sense when listened from start to end.

'The Day' was written in a hotel room in Spain at dawn when I hadn't slept. It was a beautiful hotel room, a beautiful perfect hotel room and it was six or seven in the morning. I wrote it on an acoustic guitar and recorded it on my phone, brought it home and re-recorded it with old broken down electronics that I have in my studio.
—Moby

The song "Rockets" was previously released in 2008 as the thirteenth track on A Night in NYC. That version and the Destroyed version are different.

=== Artwork ===
The artwork for the album was shot at LaGuardia Airport. Moby's flight was delayed, so he decided to explore the airport. He came across an electronic sign that said, "All unattended luggage will be destroyed." Since the sign could only fit one word at a time, he waited until the word destroyed appeared and snapped a shot. It was used as the cover art for the album and also for the corresponding photography book, because it made sense to him when he listened to the contents of the album.

== Promotion and release ==
Moby announced the title, track listing, and release date of the album on his website on February 15, 2011.

It was revealed on Moby's official web site that the first single would be "The Day". It was available in advance on iTunes from April 2, and was officially released on May 9, along with a full remix bundle.

For the next single, Moby put a poll on his web site for fans to vote for which song should be released next. After the voting ended, the chosen single was "Lie Down in Darkness", even though it came in third; the first two songs being "After" and "Blue Moon". On 30 August, Moby posted on his web site journal another request for the third official single. This time, the fans could only suggest the titles of the songs without a poll. The following day, he announced through his Twitter account that, as per choice, the next singles to be released from the album were "After" and "The Right Thing", even though "Blue Moon" was a fan favorite, as seen from the title entries and the previous poll's results. The release was a double single. On May 1, 2012, "The Poison Tree" was released as the fifth single from the album.

== Release ==
Destroyed was released on May 13, 2011, by record labels Little Idiot and Mute.

The album debuted at number 69 on the United States charts, becoming Moby's lowest-charting album to date. In the United Kingdom, the album fared better than his previous album, Wait for Me (2009), debuting at number 35. In Europe, the album reached top-10 positions in Belgium, Czech Republic, Germany and Switzerland.

=== Deluxe edition ===
On October 31, a deluxe edition of the album was released, called Destroyed Deluxe, including, in addition to the standard CD, a full disc of new music, a DVD with videos and exclusive festival footage, and a 24-page booklet with new photos taken by Moby. A free download of one of the included new songs, "The Poison Tree", was released on the album's mini-site. It was first released as part of the Download for Good compilation in support of the David Lynch Foundation.

== Reception ==
Professional ratings
Aggregate scores
Source	Rating
AnyDecentMusic?	5.8/10
Metacritic	61/100
Review scores
Source	Rating
AllMusic	3/5 stars
The A.V. Club	C+
The Daily Telegraph	3/5 stars
The Guardian	3/5 stars
The Independent	3/5 stars
Mojo	4/5 stars
Pitchfork	3.8/10
Rolling Stone	3.5/5 stars
Spin	4/10
Uncut	4/5 stars

Destroyed received mixed-to-positive reviews from critics. At Metacritic, which assigns a normalised rating out of 100 to reviews from mainstream critics, the album received an average score of 61, based on 23 reviews, which indicates "generally favorable reviews".

Jon Dolan of Rolling Stone wrote that Moby "finds a way to make permanent midnight weirdly inviting." BBC Music's Ian Moffatt praised the album, describing the songs as being "his most enduring endeavours yet." Robert Christgau gave Destroyed a three-star honorable mention rating and called it "the 18 to Wait for Me's Play—only not by as decisive a margin."

However, Mikael Wood of Spin found that, while Moby occasionally "catches a spark and rises above the mid-tempo morass," most of the album "is about as appetizing as a warmed-over deli tray."

== Destroyed Remixed ==
On April 30, 2012, Moby released Destroyed Remixed, a limited-edition, two-disc collection of remixes of songs from Destroyed. The release included three new exclusive remixes by David Lynch, Holy Ghost!, and System Divine, and also featured a brand new 30-minute ambient track by Moby called "All Sides Gone". Compiled and mixed by Moby, Destroyed Remixed was described as "an eclectic mix of some the most exciting and interesting artists and DJs in contemporary music".

== Track listing ==
All tracks are written by Moby, except "The Low Hum", co-written with Emily Zuzik, and "Lie Down in Darkness", co-written with Joy Malcolm and Justin Kielty.

Destroyed track listing
No.	Title	Length
1.	"The Broken Places"	4:10
2.	"Be the One"	3:29
3.	"Sevastopol"	4:21
4.	"The Low Hum"	4:13
5.	"Rockets"	4:47
6.	"The Day"	4:32
7.	"Lie Down in Darkness"	4:26
8.	"Victoria Lucas"	5:55
9.	"After"	5:30
10.	"Blue Moon"	3:31
11.	"The Right Thing"	4:26
12.	"Stella Maris"	5:14
13.	"The Violent Bear It Away"	6:50
14.	"Lacrimae"	8:05
15.	"When You Are Old"	2:19

Deluxe edition disc two
No.	Title	Length
1.	"The Poison Tree"	4:41
2.	"Sandpaper"	3:53
3.	"Breakdown"	3:46
4.	"Unter Den Linden"	5:02
5.	"Fortitude"	5:22
6.	"Washing"	7:57
7.	"Sweet Dreams"	4:04
8.	"The Broken Places" (full length version)	5:57
9.	"Lie Down in Darkness" (basement studio version)	3:48
10.	"The Day" (orchestral version)	3:40
11.	"Slow"	7:22

Deluxe edition disc three: Amazon Exclusive - Greatest Hits Live: Roundhouse, London. June 2011
No.	Title	Length
1.	"Be the One"	3:55
2.	"Sevastopol"	5:04
3.	"In My Heart"	5:11
4.	"Go"	4:26
5.	"The Day"	4:43
6.	"We Are Made of Stars"	4:19
7.	"Flower"	3:35
8.	"Porcelain"	3:43
9.	"Lie Down in Darkness"	5:01
10.	"Extreme Ways"	3:40
11.	"Lift Me Up"	4:41
12.	"In This World"	4:15
13.	"The Right Thing"	5:12
14.	"Honey"	5:49

DVD

Music Videos
No.	Title	Length
1.	"The Day"
2.	"Lie Down in Darkness"
3.	"Be the One"
4.	"Victoria Lucas"
5.	"Sevastopol"

Live in Concert at Main Square Festival, Arras, France in 2011
No.	Title	Length
1.	"Raining Again"
2.	"Lie Down in Darkness"
3.	"Honey"
4.	"Flower"
5.	"Disco Lies"

Saatchi & Saatchi Hello, Future Video Challenge Finalists
No.	Title	Length
1.	"After – Alberto Gomez"
2.	"Be the One – Alexey Terehoff"
3.	"After – Antonin Pevney"
4.	"Be the One – Brian McCann"
5.	"The Day – Frank Belytran"
6.	"Be the One – Lindsay Mackay"
7.	"Be the One – Manship Society"
8.	"Be the One – Martin Rodahl"
9.	"Be the One – Oden Roberts"
10.	"Be the One – Roland Wittl"

Interviews
No.	Title	Length
1.	"Destroyed 20 Min EPK"

Behind the Scenes
No.	Title	Length
1.	"The Day"
2.	"Lie Down in Darkness"

Wilcox Session Live Studio Recordings:
No.	Title	Length
1.	"Porcelain"
2.	"The Day"

== Charts ==
=== Weekly charts ===
Weekly chart performance for Destroyed
Chart (2011)	Peak position
Austrian Albums (Ö3 Austria)	27
Belgian Albums (Ultratop Flanders)	6
Belgian Albums (Ultratop Wallonia)	8
Canadian Albums (Billboard)	16
Czech Albums (ČNS IFPI)	8
Dutch Albums (Album Top 100)	14
French Albums (SNEP)	19
German Albums (Offizielle Top 100)	10
Greek Albums (IFPI)	26
Irish Albums (IRMA)	60
Italian Albums (FIMI)	38
Norwegian Albums (VG-lista)	38
Polish Albums (OLiS)	43
Portuguese Albums (AFP)	27
Scottish Albums (OCC)	40
Spanish Albums (PROMUSICAE)	35
Swiss Albums (Schweizer Hitparade)	7
UK Albums (OCC)	35
US Billboard 200	69
US Top Dance Albums (Billboard)	2

=== Year-end charts ===
Year-end chart performance for Destroyed
Chart (2011)	Position
Belgian Albums (Ultratop Flanders)	75
Belgian Albums (Ultratop Wallonia)	92

== Certifications ==
Certifications for Destroyed
Region	Certification	Certified units/sales
Russia (NFPF)	Gold	5,000^{*}
^{*} Sales figures based on certification alone.

== See also ==
- Victoria Lucas (Sylvia Plath)
- Sevastopol
