= Hilary Gardner =

American jazz vocalist

- Genres: Jazz, vocal jazz, swing, classical
- Occupation: Vocalist
- Labels: Anzic
- Website: www.hilarygardner.com

Hilary Gardner is an American jazz vocalist. She is a member of the vocal trio Duchess with Amy Cervini and Melissa Stylianou.

== Career ==
Gardner grew up in Wasilla, Alaska. At an early age she was attracted to the voice of Ella Fitzgerald, particularly the album Ella Fitzgerald Sings the Cole Porter Songbook. She has also expressed admiration for Patsy Cline, Aretha Franklin, Joni Mitchell, and Tom Waits. She was a member of the Alaska Children's Choir. She studied classical voice and performed with the Anchorage Opera. Her professional career began singing country music in bars in Wasilla. She moved to New York City, and for ten years she worked as a waitress.

In 2010 she appeared in Come Fly with Me, a Broadway musical choreographed by Twyla Tharp around the music of Frank Sinatra. Gardner sang in front of a 17-piece big band. Her first solo album, The Great City, was a tribute to New York. She recorded The Late Set with pianist Ehud Asherie.

In 2013 she co-founded the vocal trio Duchess with Amy Cervini and Melissa Stylianou. The group is inspired by The Boswell Sisters. The arranger is Oded Lev-Ari, co-owner of Anzic Records.

== Discography ==
=== As leader and co-leader ===
- The Great City (Anzic, 2014)
- The Late Set with Ehud Asherie (Anzic, 2017)
- Charles Ruggiero & Hilary Gardner Play The Bird & The Bee (SmallsLIVE, 2017)
- On the Trail with The Lonesome Pines (Anzic, 2024)

With Duchess

- Duchess (Anzic, 2015)
- Laughing at Life (Anzic, 2016)
- Harmony for the Holidays with Duchess (Anzic, 2018)
- Live at Jazz Standard (Anzic, 2020)

=== As guest ===
- 2004 Oasis, Mike Longo
- 2009 Wait for Me, Moby
- 2014 Swing Makes You Happy!, George Gee
- 2014 Boom Bang Boom Bang, Charles Ruggiero
- 2015 Certain Relationships, Art Lillard's Heavenly Band (Summit)
- 2018 Old Fashioned Gal, Kat Edmonson (Spinnerette)
- 2020 Dreamers Do, Kat Edmonson (Spinnerette)
