= Lie Down in Darkness (Moby song) =

Single by Moby

from the album Destroyed
- Released: August 1, 2011
- Recorded: 2010
- Genre: Electronica
- Length: 4:25
- Label: Little Idiot; Mute
- Songwriters: Moby; Joy Malcolm; Justin Kielty
- Producer: Moby

Moby singles chronology
"The Day" (2011)	"Lie Down in Darkness" (2011)	"After" (2011)

Music video
- "Moby 'Lie Down In Darkness' official video" on YouTube

"Lie Down in Darkness" is a song by American electronica musician Moby. It was released as the third single from his tenth studio album Destroyed on August 1, 2011.

== Background ==
The song features vocals from Joy Malcolm (now Joy Farrukh), who later joined him on his 2011 Destroyed Tour in support of the album.

== Release ==
On June 24, 2011, Moby announced that a new single would be released from Destroyed, and invited users to suggest a song to release as a single through the website. On June 27, it was announced that the next single would be "Lie Down in Darkness."

A "Lie Down in Darkness" sample was used in the 2012 Hugo Boss Nuit Pour Femme advert featuring Gwyneth Paltrow.

== Music video ==
On August 15, the song's video was released exclusively via Wired. It was filmed by UK filmmakers Institute for Eyes, who also directed the documentary Isolation. The video follows an astronaut looking back on his life of space travel, journeying through an architecturally heightened London.

Luke Seomore and Joseph Bull, aka Institute for Eyes, said about the idea for the video: “The song has a graceful, very cinematic quality, so the idea of weightlessness quickly began to form. An intense otherworldly journey seemed to mirror the atmosphere of the song. Somesuch and Co. helped us to put together a great team to make the video happen; we hope you enjoy it.” Moby said about the video: "It was great working with video directors Institute for Eyes, and I'm happy with the final result. Their video really enhances the cinematic qualities in the song." Photek's remix of Lie Down in Darkness was nominated for a Grammy in 2012

== Track listing ==
- Digital download
1. "Lie Down in Darkness" (radio edit) – 3:20
2. "Lie Down in Darkness" (Paul van Dyk Remix) – 9:09
3. "Lie Down in Darkness" (Photek Remix) – 5:35
4. "Lie Down in Darkness" (Bassjackers Remix) – 6:01
5. "Lie Down in Darkness" (Arno Cost Remix) – 7:18
6. "Lie Down in Darkness" (Rob da Bank Remix) – 5:16
- Digital download – remixes (IDIOT014D1)
1. "Lie Down in Darkness" (Ben Hoo's Dorian Vibe) – 3:52
2. "Lie Down in Darkness" (Arno Cost Remix) – 7:18
3. "Lie Down in Darkness" (Clouds Remix) – 6:02
4. "Lie Down in Darkness" (Bassjackers Remix) – 6:01
5. "Lie Down in Darkness" (Document One Remix) – 5:37
6. "Lie Down in Darkness" (Chris Liebing Remix) – 9:32
7. "Lie Down in Darkness" (Gregor Tresher Remix) – 5:45
8. "Lie Down in Darkness" (Kasper Bjørke Remix) – 5:03
9. "Lie Down in Darkness" (Michael Mayer Remix) – 7:37
10. "Lie Down in Darkness" (Photek Remix) – 5:35
11. "Lie Down in Darkness" (Sei A Remix) – 6:09
12. "Lie Down in Darkness" (Paul van Dyk Remix) – 9:09

== Charts ==
Chart (2011)	Peak position
Belgium (Ultratip Bubbling Under Flanders)	35
Belgium (Ultratip Bubbling Under Wallonia)	27

== Release history ==
Region	Date	Format	Label
Worldwide	July 18, 2011	Digital download	Little Idiot
United Kingdom	August 1, 2011	Digital download	Little Idiot
United States	August 2, 2011	Digital download	Little Idiot
