= These Systems Are Failing =

2016 studio album by Moby & the Void Pacific Choir

Studio album by Moby & The Void Pacific Choir
- Released: October 14, 2016
- Recorded: 2014–16
- Genres: Punk rock; post-punk; new wave; electropunk
- Length: 35:46
- Labels: Little Idiot; Mute
- Producer: Moby

Moby chronology
Music from Porcelain (2016)	These Systems Are Failing (2016)	More Fast Songs About the Apocalypse (2017)

Singles from These Systems Are Failing
- 1. "The Light Is Clear in My Eyes" Released: September 29, 2015; 2. "Almost Loved" Released: October 9, 2015; 3. "Don't Leave Me" Released: November 25, 2016; 4. "Are You Lost in the World Like Me?" Released: December 9, 2016; 5. "Erupt and Matter" Released: February 3, 2017

These Systems Are Failing is the thirteenth studio album by American electronica musician Moby and the debut studio album by Moby & The Void Pacific Choir, a musical project formed by Moby with musicians Mindy Jones, Julie Mintz, Joel Nesvadba, Jamie Drake, Jonathan Nesvadba, and Lauren Tyler Scott. It was released on October 14, 2016 by record labels Little Idiot and Mute.

== Critical reception ==
Professional ratings
Aggregate scores
Source	Rating
AnyDecentMusic?	6.3/10
Metacritic	61/100
Review scores
Source	Rating
AllMusic	3.5/5 stars
Clash	8/10
Consequence of Sound	B
Exclaim!	7/10
The Independent	3/5 stars
Mojo	4/5 stars
MusicOMH	3/5 stars
Pitchfork	4.0/10
PopMatters	5/10
Sputnikmusic	4/5

Andrew Dorsett of PopMatters stated "These Systems Are Failing arrives at your ears with all the subtlety and sonic nuance of a brick wall. It would probably sound like this in any format based on the way it was produced, but when listened to as MP3s as most listeners doubtlessly will, its weaknesses are quite literally amplified... Only through brief glimpses is one able to perceive the dystopian present as Moby and company wish for us to see it. As a work of social activism the album is able to at least make a point, but as a work of art, it generally fails to cast the spell".

== Track listing ==
All tracks are written by Moby.

No.	Title	Length
1.	"Hey! Hey!"	4:23
2.	"Break.Doubt"	4:12
3.	"I Wait for You"	4:00
4.	"Don't Leave Me"	4:38
5.	"Erupt and Matter"	4:10
6.	"Are You Lost in the World Like Me?"	4:26
7.	"A Simple Love"	4:39
8.	"The Light Is Clear in My Eyes"	3:26
9.	"And It Hurts"	1:53
Total length:		35:46

Deluxe edition bonus tracks
No.	Title	Length
10.	"Almost Loved"	5:05
11.	"The Nighttime"	4:10
12.	"Dark Star"	3:47
Total length:		48:48

== Personnel ==
Credits for These Systems Are Failing adapted from album liner notes.

Moby & The Void Pacific Choir

- Moby – engineering, production, writing, instruments, vocals
- Jamie Drake – vocals
- Mindy Jones – vocals
- Julie Mintz – vocals
- Joel Nesvadba – vocals
- Jonathan Nesvadba – vocals, studio assistance, technical support
- Lauren Tyler Scott – vocals
- Jeff Sosnow – vocals

Additional personnel

- Clay Bair – engineering (choir vocal)
- Emily Lazar – mastering
- Mark Needham – mixing
- Ben O'Neill – mixing assistance

Artwork and design

- Melissa Danis – additional camera operation
- Melissa Danis – photography assistance
- Friend of a Friend – design
- Julie Mintz – camera operation (cover and back cover)
- Moby – photography, image processing

== Charts ==
Chart (2016)	Peak position
Belgian Albums (Ultratop Flanders)	46
Belgian Albums (Ultratop Wallonia)	39
French Albums (SNEP)	63
Swiss Albums (Schweizer Hitparade)	75
US Top Dance Albums (Billboard)	10
