= Shot in the Back of the Head =

2009 single by Moby

Single by Moby

from the album Wait for Me
- Released: April 14, 2009
- Length: 3:15
- Label: Little Idiot; Mute
- Songwriter(s): Moby
- Producer(s): Moby

Moby singles chronology
"Ooh Yeah" (2008)	"Shot in the Back of the Head" (2009)	"Pale Horses" (2009)

Music video
- "Moby 'Shot In The Back Of The Head' by David Lynch" on YouTube

"Shot in the Back of the Head" is a song by American electronica musician Moby. It was released as the first single from his ninth studio album Wait for Me as a free download on his website on April 14, 2009. The song is notable for its reversed and chopped up guitar progression.

The song was used in the original soundtrack for the movie Charlie Countryman.

== Music video ==
The man in the video kissing his lover, a woman's head

The music video for the song, directed and animated by David Lynch, was released on April 14, 2009, on Pitchfork.tv. The video contains crude drawings of various objects and landscapes, such as cityscapes and factories. The music video's plot follows a man, whose lover is a woman's head. An unknown person shoots the man in the back of the head, murdering him. The woman's head jumps on the killer and murders him. The video concludes with drawings of the night sky as the video fades to black.

== Track listing ==
- Digital single
1. "Shot in the Back of the Head" – 3:15
