= Mistake (Moby song) =

Single by Moby

from the album Wait for Me
- Released: September 14, 2009
- Length: 3:47
- Label: Little Idiot; Mute
- Songwriter: Moby
- Producer: Moby

Moby singles chronology
"Pale Horses" (2009)	"Mistake" (2009)	"One Time We Lived" (2009)

"Mistake" (stylized as "mistake") is a song by American electronica musician Moby. It was released as the third single from his ninth studio album Wait for Me on September 14, 2009. The first official music video for the song was animated by Robert Powers. Two alternate music videos were also directed by Yoann Lemoine and Katy Baugh, respectively.

== Track listing ==
- 12-inch single (IDIOT005T)
1. "Mistake" (LIFELIKE Remix) – 7:14
2. "Mistake" (Funkagenda Edit) – 3:43
3. "Mistake" (Yuksek Remix) – 4:55
4. "Mistake" (Dabruck & Klein Remix) – 6:13
- Digital single – remixes
1. "Mistake" (radio edit) – 3:46
2. "Mistake" (LIFELIKE Remix) – 7:14
3. "Mistake" (Yuksek Remix) – 4:55
4. "Mistake" (Maxime Dangles Remix) – 7:54
5. "Mistake" (Dabruck & Klein Remix) – 6:13
6. "Mistake" (Funkagenda Remix) – 8:10
7. "Mistake" (Shout Out Out Out Out Remix) – 6:16
8. "Mistake" (Soundfly / Rusty Egan Remix) – 6:49
9. "Mistake" (Closing Doors Remix) – 3:14
10. "Mistake" (Davide Rossi Re-Work Instrumental) – 3:39
11. "Mistake" (Alan Vega Remix) – 4:06

== Charts ==
Chart (2009)	Peak position
Belgium (Ultratip Bubbling Under Flanders)	2
Belgium (Ultratip Bubbling Under Wallonia)	13
Belgium Dance (Ultratop)	24
US Dance Club Songs (Billboard)	19
