= I Predict a Graceful Expulsion =

Studio album by Cold Specks
- Released: May 21, 2012 (world); May 22, 2012 (United States) (Canada)
- Recorded: 2009–2012
- Genre: Soul music Goth rock
- Length: 37:01
- Label: Mute/EMI Records; 50999 6 44779 2 3 MUT 44779 (world) 7245 9 69532 2 8 MUT 69532 (United States) Arts & Crafts/EMI Records; 8275 9 07000 2 4 ANC 07000 (Canada)
- Producer: Jim Anderson

Cold Specks chronology
I Predict a Graceful Expulsion (2012)	Neuroplasticity (2014)

I Predict a Graceful Expulsion is the debut album by Cold Specks

The album was named as a long-listed nominee for the 2012 Polaris Music Prize on June 14, 2012.

== Track listing ==
1. The Mark
2. Heavy Hands
3. Winter Solstice
4. When the City Lights Dim
5. Hector
6. Holland
7. Elephant Head
8. Send Your Youth
9. Blank Maps
10. Steady
11. Lay Me Down
