= Cold Specks =

Canadian singer-songwriter

- Also known as: Al Spx
- Born: Ladan Hussein; Toronto
- Genres: Soul; gothic rock
- Occupation: artist
- Years active: 2011–present
- Labels: Mute/EMI Records (world except Canada); Arts & Crafts/EMI Records (Canada)

Cold Specks is the stage name of Somali Canadian singer-songwriter Ladan Hussein, who was previously known as Al Spx. Her music has been described as doom-soul. The name Cold Specks is taken from a line in James Joyce's Ulysses ("Born all in the dark wormy earth, cold specks of fire, evil lights shining in the darkness.").

She released her debut album, I Predict a Graceful Expulsion, on May 21, 2012, on Mute Records and Arts & Crafts in Canada. The album was a short-listed nominee for the 2012 Polaris Music Prize.

Her second album, Neuroplasticity, was released on August 26, 2014. It featured trumpet playing by Ambrose Akinmusire and backing vocals from Michael Gira of Swans, was supported in part by selected dates opening for Sufjan Stevens on his Carrie & Lowell Tour, and was long-listed for the 2015 Polaris Music Prize. Her third album, Fool's Paradise, followed in 2017.

Following Fool's Paradise, Hussein suffered a mental-health breakdown and underwent several months of treatment at Toronto's Centre for Addiction and Mental Health, where she was diagnosed with schizophrenia. In 2025 she released Light for the Midnight, her first full-length album since her health issues. It was long-listed for the 2025 Polaris Music Prize.

== Albums ==
- 2012: I Predict a Graceful Expulsion #86 CAN
- 2014: Neuroplasticity
- 2017: Fool's Paradise
- 2025: Light for the Midnight

== Singles ==
- 2011: "Holland"
- 2012: "Winter Solstice"
- 2012: "Blank Maps"
- 2012: "Hector"
- 2014: "Absisto"
- 2015: "Bodies at Bay"
- 2017: "Fool's Paradise"
- 2024: "Wandering in the Wild"

== Awards and nominations ==
Year	Association	Category	Nominated work	Result
2012	2012 Polaris Music Prize	Polaris Music Prize	I Predict a Graceful Expulsion	Nominated
2013	SiriusXM Indies Awards	Artist of the Year	Cold Specks	Nominated
2013	SiriusXM Indies Awards	Female Artist of the Year	Cold Specks	Won
2013	SiriusXM Indies Awards	Songwriter of the Year	Cold Specks	Nominated
2013	SiriusXM Indies Awards	Soul/R&B Artist or Group of the Year	Cold Specks	Nominated
