= Pale Horses (song) =

Single by Moby

from the album Wait for Me
- Released: June 22, 2009
- Length: 3:37
- Label: Little Idiot; Mute
- Songwriter: Moby
- Producer: Moby

Moby singles chronology
"Shot in the Back of the Head" (2009)	"Pale Horses" (2009)	"Mistake" (2009)

Music video
- "Moby 'Pale Horses'" on YouTube

"Pale Horses" (stylized as "pale horses") is a song by American electronica musician Moby. It was released as the second single from his ninth studio album Wait for Me on June 22, 2009. Vocals on the song are performed by Amelia Zirin-Brown.

== Music video ==
The "Pale Horses" music video was directed and animated by Elanna Allen. It features the alien "Little Idiot", depicted on the Wait for Me cover. The video depicts the alien, seeking company, creating several drawings which come to life, beginning with a replica of himself, which is washed away by rain. He later draws a dog and a train which he uses to travel to the Moon, where he draws an entire crowd of replicas to dance with, until they too are washed away by rain, leaving him alone once again.

== Track listing ==
- Limited edition 7-inch single (IDIOT004T)
1. "Pale Horses" (Apparat Dub) – 3:28
2. "Pale Horses" (Ben Hoo's Adaptation) – 5:14
- 12-inch single (IDIOT004T-2)
1. "Pale Horses" (Gui Boratto's Last Window Remix) – 7:36
2. "Pale Horses" (Apparat Remix) – 6:46
3. "Pale Horses" (Empyrean Dub Version) – 4:28
- Digital single
1. "Pale Horses" – 3:36
2. "Pale Horses" (Gui Boratto's Last Window Remix) – 7:36
3. "Pale Horses" (Apparat Remix) – 6:46
4. "Pale Horses" (VC1) – 6:36
5. "Pale Horses" (Empyrean Dub) – 3:36

Bonus track – digital remixes single

6. "Pale Horses" (Davide Rossi Re-Interpretation) – 3:30

== Charts ==
Chart (2009)	Peak position
Belgium (Ultratop 50 Flanders)	20
Belgium (Ultratop 50 Wallonia)	25
Belgium Dance (Ultratop)	5
US Dance/Electronic Singles Sales (Billboard)	3
