= Wait for Me (Moby album) =

Studio album by Moby
- Released: June 29, 2009
- Recorded: 2008–2009
- Studios: Moby's home studio (Manhattan, New York)
- Genres: Downtempo; ambient; electronica
- Length: 52:06
- Labels: Little Idiot; Mute
- Producer: Moby

Moby chronology
Last Night Remixed (2008)	Wait for Me (2009)	Wait for Me: Ambient (2009)

Deluxe edition cover

Singles from Wait for Me
- 1. "Shot in the Back of the Head" Released: April 14, 2009; 2. "Pale Horses" Released: June 22, 2009; 3. "Mistake" Released: September 14, 2009; 4. "One Time We Lived" Released: November 15, 2009; 5. "Wait for Me" Released: May 2, 2010

Wait for Me (stylized as wait for me.) is the ninth studio album by American electronica musician Moby. It was released on June 29, 2009, by Little Idiot and Mute.

== Background ==
Moby began work on Wait for Me in 2008. He recorded the entirety of the album in his home studio on the Lower East Side of Manhattan, New York, with a set-up he described as "a bunch of equipment set up in a small bedroom". Discussing the start of the album's recording, Moby said:

I started working on the album about a year ago, and the creative impetus behind the record was hearing a David Lynch speech at BAFTA, in the UK. David was talking about creativity, and to paraphrase, about how creativity in and of itself, and without market pressures, is fine and good. It seems as if too often an artists or musicians or writers creative output is judged by how well it accommodates the marketplace, and how much market share it commands and how much money it generates. In making this record, I wanted to focus on making something that I loved, without really being concerned about how it might be received by the marketplace. As a result, it's a quieter and more melodic and more mournful and more personal record than some of the records I've made in the past.

Moby and David Lynch discussed the recording process of the album on Lynch's online channel, David Lynch Foundation Television Beta. Lynch also directed the music video for "Shot in the Back of the Head," the first single from the album.

Ken Thomas mixed Wait for Me. According to Moby, "mixing the record with him was really nice, as he's creatively open to trying anything." For example, Moby and Ken Thomas recorded an old broken bakelite radio through some broken old effects pedals, which became the track "Stock Radio."

== Release ==
Moby announced the title, track listing, and release date of Wait for Me on his website on April 14, 2009. The announcement was accompanied by the release of the album's first single, "Shot in the Back of the Head," and its accompanying music video, directed by David Lynch. "Pale Horses" was released as the second single from Wait for Me on June 22, 2009. The album was released on June 29.

"Mistake" was released as the third single from Wait for Me, on September 14, 2009. Music videos for "Pale Horses" and "Mistake" were also released, both featuring the alien shown on the Wait for Me cover, a new design of the character "Little Idiot," who appeared in earlier Moby videos, including "Why Does My Heart Feel So Bad?" and "Natural Blues," and also provided the name of Moby's own label, on which the album was released.

Wait for Me: Ambient, a remix album consisting of ambient versions of songs from Wait for Me, was released as a digital download on November 2, 2009. Wait for Me was re-released as a deluxe edition on November 23, 2009, featuring the complete Wait for Me original album and two new songs, Wait for Me: Ambient, and a DVD featuring several live performances, an intimate EPK of the album, a section of questions and answers, and five music videos made for the album. Wait for Me. Remixes!, another remix album featuring reworkings of songs from Wait for Me by various producers, was released on May 17, 2010.

"One Time We Lived," one of the two new songs on the Wait for Me deluxe edition, was released as a single on November 15, 2009.

"Wait for Me" was released as the fifth and final single from the album on May 2, 2010.

== Critical reception ==
Professional ratings
Aggregate scores
Source	Rating
AnyDecentMusic?	6.2/10
Metacritic	65/100
Review scores
Source	Rating
AllMusic	3.5/5 stars
Chicago Tribune	3/4 stars
The Guardian	3/5 stars
The Independent	3/5 stars
MSN Music (Consumer Guide)	A−
Pitchfork	5.4/10
Record Collector	4/5 stars
Rolling Stone	3.5/5 stars
Spin	7/10
USA Today	3/4 stars

At Metacritic, which assigns a normalized rating out of 100 to reviews from mainstream critics, Wait for Me received an average score of 65 based on 26 reviews, indicating "generally favourable reviews".

== Tour ==
Moby toured for Wait for Me with a full band, the first time he had used one since 2005.

In his journal entry on April 25, 2009, Moby wrote: "the touring for the upcoming album (barring sporadic dj dates) will be with a full band and multiple vocalists, although i might incorporate some elements of the electronic/ambient show, as it enabled me to perform some songs i’d never been able to perform before (like ‘god moving over the face of the waters’, and other instrumental songs from the past)."

== Track listing ==
All tracks are written by Moby.

No.	Title	Length
1.	"Division"	1:56
2.	"Pale Horses"	3:37
3.	"Shot in the Back of the Head"	3:15
4.	"Study War"	4:18
5.	"Walk with Me"	4:01
6.	"Stock Radio"	0:55
7.	"Mistake"	3:47
8.	"Scream Pilots"	2:48
9.	"jltf-1"	1:27
10.	"jltf"	4:40
11.	"A Seated Night"	3:23
12.	"Wait for Me"	4:13
13.	"Hope Is Gone"	3:30
14.	"Ghost Return"	2:38
15.	"Slow Light"	4:00
16.	"Isolate"	3:28
Total length:		52:06

iTunes Europe edition bonus tracks
No.	Title	Length
17.	"Grit"	4:49
18.	"Pale Horses" (VC2 – Moby Remix)	7:09
Total length:		64:04

Deluxe edition bonus tracks
No.	Title	Length
17.	"One Time We Lived"	4:19
18.	"Stay Down"	7:02
Total length:		63:27

Limited edition bonus disc: Pale Horses EP
No.	Title	Length
1.	"Pale Horses" (Apparat Dub)	3:29
2.	"Pale Horses" (Empyrean Dub Version)	4:25
3.	"Pale Horses" (VC1 – Moby Remix)	6:35
4.	"Walk with Me (Reprise)"	3:27
Total length:		17:56

Deluxe edition bonus disc: Wait for Me: Ambient
No.	Title	Length
1.	"A Seated Night"	3:56
2.	"Study War"	4:30
3.	"Pale Horses"	4:56
4.	"Stay Down"	6:37
5.	"Hope Is Gone"	3:08
6.	"Wait for Me"	4:25
7.	"Division"	1:38
8.	"Mistake"	3:37
9.	"Walk with Me"	2:58
10.	"Isolate"	3:08
11.	"Shot in the Back of the Head"	3:16
12.	"Slow Light 1"	3:04
13.	"Ghost Return"	2:34
14.	"Scream Pilots"	7:49
15.	"jltf3"	4:20
16.	"Slow Light"	3:09
Total length:		63:15

=== Deluxe edition bonus DVD ===
Live
No.	Title	Length
1.	"Raining Again" (live at Hurricane Festival)	5:06
2.	"Bodyrock" (live at Hurricane Festival)	3:30
3.	"Pale Horses" (live at Hurricane Festival)	3:52
4.	"Shot in the Back of the Head" (live at Hurricane Festival)	3:46
5.	"Mistake" (live at Hurricane Festival)	3:53
6.	"We Are All Made of Stars" (Trance Version) (live at Sonne Mond Sterne Festival)	7:43
7.	"Feeling So Real" (live at Sonne Mond Sterne Festival)	5:13
8.	"Go" (live at Exit Festival)	4:20
9.	"Lift Me Up" (live at Exit Festival)	4:29
10.	"Walk with Me" (live at Main Square Festival)	2:54
Total length:		44:46

Wait for Me Blips
No.	Title	Length
1.	"Division"	0:45
2.	"Pale Horses"	0:45
3.	"Shot in the Back of the Head"	0:45
4.	"Study War"	0:48
5.	"Walk with Me"	0:45
6.	"Stock Radio"	0:53
7.	"Mistake"	0:45
8.	"Scream Pilots"	0:45
9.	"jltf-1"	0:45
10.	"jltf"	0:45
11.	"A Seated Night"	0:45
12.	"Wait for Me"	0:45
13.	"Hope Is Gone"	0:45
14.	"Ghost Return"	0:45
15.	"Slow Light"	0:45
16.	"Isolate"	0:45
Total length:		12:11

EPK
No.	Title	Length
1.	"Dog Interviews Little Idiot on Bug Planet"	10:53
2.	"EPK"	8:27
Total length:		19:20

Music videos
No.	Title	Length
1.	"Shot in the Back of the Head" (video by David Lynch)	3:12
2.	"Pale Horses" (video by Elanna Allen)	3:38
3.	"Mistake" (UFO video by Yoann Lemoine)	3:49
4.	"Mistake" (animated video by Robert Powers)	4:01
5.	"Mistake" (stop motion animation by Katy Baugh)	3:51
Total length:		18:31

== Personnel ==
Credits for Wait for Me adapted from album liner notes.

- Moby – engineering, production, writing, instruments, vocals on "Mistake", artwork
- Hilary Gardner – vocals on "Hope Is Gone"
- Leela James – vocals on "Walk with Me"
- Ted Jensen – mastering
- Andy Marcinkowski – mix engineering (assistant)
- Kelli Scarr – vocals on "Wait for Me"
- Starr Black Shere – vocals on "Study War"
- Ken Thomas – mixing
- Melody Zimmer – vocals on "jltf"
- Amelia Zirin-Brown – vocals on "Pale Horses"

== Charts ==
=== Weekly charts ===
Chart (2009)	Peak position
Australian Albums (ARIA)	50
Austrian Albums (Ö3 Austria)	15
Belgian Albums (Ultratop Flanders)	2
Belgian Alternative Albums (Ultratop Flanders)	1
Belgian Albums (Ultratop Wallonia)	2
Canadian Albums (Billboard)	17
Czech Albums (ČNS IFPI)	15
Danish Albums (Hitlisten)	35
Dutch Albums (Album Top 100)	16
French Albums (SNEP)	5
German Albums (Offizielle Top 100)	18
Hungarian Albums (MAHASZ)	38
Irish Albums (IRMA)	59
Mexican Albums (Top 100 Mexico)	100
New Zealand Albums (RMNZ)	40
Spanish Albums (Promusicae)	36
Swiss Albums (Schweizer Hitparade)	4
UK Albums (Official Charts)	44
UK Dance Albums (Official Charts)	1
UK Independent Albums (Official Charts)	6
US Billboard 200	22
US Top Alternative Albums (Billboard)	8
US Top Dance Albums (Billboard)	2

=== Year-end charts ===
Chart (2009)	Position
Belgian Albums (Ultratop Flanders)	29
Belgian Albums (Ultratop Wallonia)	65
French Albums (SNEP)	111
US Top Dance/Electronic Albums (Billboard)	17

== Certifications ==
Region	Certification	Certified units/sales
Belgium (BRMA)	Gold	15,000^{*}
^{*} Sales figures based on certification alone.
