= MobySongs 1993–1998 =

Compilation album by Moby
- Released: 18 July 2000
- Recorded: 1993–1998
- Genre: Electronica; techno
- Length: 75:10
- Label: Elektra
- Producer: Moby

Moby chronology
Play (1999)	MobySongs 1993–1998 (2000)	Play: The B Sides (2000)

MobySongs 1993–1998, also known as Songs 1993–1998 or simply Mobysongs, is a compilation album by American electronica musician Moby. It features selections from his work released in North America on the Elektra label, before his breakout 1999 release, Play.

== Critical reception ==
Professional ratings
Review scores
Source	Rating
AllMusic	3/5 stars
Entertainment Weekly	A
Pitchfork	3.2/10
Tom Hull – on the Web	B+

David Browne of Entertainment Weekly recommended the compilation to listeners intrigued by Play, adding, "No blues or gospel samples here, but the same spiritual-techno vibe is evident in brilliant early singles like 'Go,' sighing-keyboard instrumentals, and a hefty share of genre-crossing cuts from 1995's everlasting Everything Is Wrong." John Bush of AllMusic was complimentary of the material itself, which he felt showcased Moby's "continuing excellence in a number of genres", noting that the tracks from Everything Is Wrong and Animal Rights in particular "sound much better in this format, divorced from the rock flame-outs that often surrounded them on the original albums", but criticized the exclusion of his seminal earlier work and the lack of rarities.

== Track listing ==
All tracks are written by Moby, except where noted.

No.	Title	Writer(s)	Original release	Length
1.	"First Cool Hive"		Everything Is Wrong	5:16
2.	"Go" (remix)	Moby; Angelo Badalamenti; David Lynch	I Like to Score	3:59
3.	"Into the Blue"	Moby; Mimi Goese	Everything Is Wrong	5:32
4.	"Now I Let It Go"		Animal Rights	2:09
5.	"Move (You Make Me Feel So Good)"		Move	3:37
6.	"I Like to Score"		I Like to Score	2:21
7.	"Anthem"		Everything Is Wrong	3:27
8.	"Hymn"		Everything Is Wrong	3:18
9.	"Feeling So Real"		Everything Is Wrong	3:23
10.	"God Moving Over the Face of the Waters (Heat Mix)"		I Like to Score	5:45
11.	"Alone"		Animal Rights	10:47
12.	"Novio"		I Like to Score	2:39
13.	"The Rain Falls and the Sky Shudders"		Move	6:16
14.	"When It's Cold I'd Like to Die"	Moby; Goese	Everything Is Wrong	4:15
15.	"Living"		Animal Rights	7:01
16.	"Grace"		I Like to Score	5:25
Total length:				75:10

== Personnel ==
Credits for MobySongs 1993–1998 adapted from album liner notes.

- Moby – engineering, mixing, production, programming, recording, writing
- Kochie Banton – vocals on "Feeling So Real"
- Curt Frasca – engineering on "Move (You Make Me Feel So Good)"
- Mimi Goese – vocals on "Into the Blue" and "When It's Cold I'd Like to Die"
- Rozz Morehead – vocals on "Move (You Make Me Feel So Good)"
- Alan Moulder – engineering on "Now I Let It Go" and "Living"
- Myim Rose – vocals on "Feeling So Real"
- Hahn Rowe – violin on "Now I Let It Go"
- Carole Sylvan – vocals on "Move (You Make Me Feel So Good)"
- Nicole Zaray – vocals on "Feeling So Real"

Artwork and design

- Patrick Hegarty – artwork, photography

== Charts ==
Chart (2000)	Peak position
US Billboard 200	137
