= Rock the House =

Rock the House may refer to:

== Film and television ==
- Rock the House, a 2011 television film directed by Ernie Barbarash
- Rock the House, a 2002 television series hosted by Lisa Snowdon

== Music ==
=== Albums ===
- Rock the House (album), a 1987 album by American hip hop duo DJ Jazzy Jeff & the Fresh Prince
- Rock the House, a 1989 album by American singer Nicole
- Rock the House Live!, a 1991 album by American hard rock band Heart
- Tiny Grimes and His Rocking Highlanders: Rock the House 1947-1953, a compilation album by Tiny Grimes

=== Songs ===
- "Rock the House" (Afrojack song), 2012
- "Rock the House" (Gorillaz song), 2000
- "Rock the House", a song by AC/DC from their 2014 album Rock or Bust
- "Rock the House", a song by Bobby Watson from his 1993 album This Little Light of Mine
- "Rock the House", a song by DJ Jazzy Jeff & the Fresh Prince from their 1987 album Rock the House
- "Rock the House", a song by Erick Morillo from his 2003 album Subliminal Sessions, Vol. 5
- "Rock the House", a song by Grandmaster Flash from their 1985 album They Said It Couldn't Be Done
- "Rock the House", a song by Greg Kihn from his 1980 album Glass House Rock
- "Rock the House", a song by Kat DeLuna from her 2011 release of her album Inside Out
- "Rock the House", a song by Moby, released under the pseudonym "Brainstorm", from the 1990 album Instinct Dance
- "Rock the House", a song by album by American singer Nicole from her 1989 album Rock the House
- "Rock the House", a song by Pretty Maids from their 1990 album Jump the Gun
- "Rock the House", a song by Quiet Riot from their 2001 album Guilty Pleasures
- "Rock the House", a song by Run–D.M.C. from his 1985 album King of Rock
- "Rock the House", a song by Belgian dance project Scoop, released in 2000
- "Rock the House", a song by Screamin' Jay Hawkins from his 1994 album Somethin' Funny Goin' On
- "Rock the House", a song by Willie Dixon
- "Rock da House", a song by Tall Paul
- "Rok da House", by Beatmasters featuring Cookie Crew, 1987

== See also ==
- Rock the House Parliamentary Competition
- Rock House (disambiguation)
