= Everything Is Wrong (album) =

1995 studio album by Moby

Studio album by Moby
- Released: March 14, 1995
- Recorded: 1994
- Studio: Moby's home studio (Manhattan)
- Genres: Electronica; rave; electronic rock; ambient techno
- Length: 46:47
- Labels: Mute; Elektra
- Producer: Moby

Moby chronology
Move (1993)	Everything Is Wrong (1995)	Everything Is Wrong: Non-Stop DJ Mix (1996)

Singles from Everything Is Wrong
- 1. "Hymn" Released: May 1994; 2. "Feeling So Real" Released: October 1994; 3. "Everytime You Touch Me" Released: February 13, 1995; 4. "Into the Blue" Released: June 19, 1995; 5. "Bring Back My Happiness" Released: September 5, 1995

Everything Is Wrong is the third studio album by American electronica musician Moby, released on March 14, 1995, by record labels Mute in the United Kingdom and Elektra in the United States. It was released with a limited-edition bonus disc of ambient music titled Underwater.

== Background ==
Following the release of two albums, Moby and Ambient, on Instinct, Moby signed to Mute and Elektra and began work on what he felt was his first "legitimate" album, seeking to create a record that encompassed his various musical influences. Moby later described Everything Is Wrong as "a record that almost served as a lifeboat for the songs I cared the most about", noting that he attempted to cover as many musical styles as possible not "out of trying to be eclectic, but just because I was in love with all of these genres and I felt like this may be my only chance to make a record."

Moby recorded and mixed the album himself in his apartment on Mott Street in Manhattan, New York, using inexpensive recording equipment. Everything Is Wrong features guest vocal contributions from Rozz Morehead, whom Moby had met while performing on the British television program Top of the Pops, and Mimi Goese, whose work with the band Hugo Largo he admired, and who he later found out lived just a block away from him.

== Content ==
Moby titled the album Everything Is Wrong and wrote its extensive accompanying liner notes as a means of expressing some ideas that he felt were important to him, reflecting in 2015, "At the time, I was—and am still—a vegan and an animal rights activist, really militant in all my beliefs. So I would wake up really angry every day, and sleep angry every night because I thought the world was in terrible shape, and I thought, 'What small thing can I do to express my beliefs that the world is in such terrible shape?' And that’s where the title of the album came from." Inside the album's booklet, Moby provides two personal essays, quotes from notable figures (from Albert Einstein to St. Francis of Assisi), and facts that he has collected regarding subjects such as vegetarianism, environmentalism, and animal experiments.

== Critical reception ==
Professional ratings
Review scores
Source	Rating
AllMusic	4.5/5 stars
Chicago Tribune	4/4 stars
Entertainment Weekly	A−
The Guardian	4/4 stars
Los Angeles Times	4/4 stars
NME	8/10
Q	4/5 stars
Rolling Stone	4/5 stars
Spin	9/10
The Village Voice	A−

Everything Is Wrong was released to critical acclaim. Spin's Barry Walters praised its diverse musical range compared to most other "one-dimensional" electronic albums and dubbed it "a hugely passionate album held together by its intensity". Greg Kot of the Chicago Tribune stated that Moby "explodes the boundaries of the genre" with an album "as moving as it is adventurous", and Lorraine Ali of the Los Angeles Times wrote that Everything Is Wrong "swoops from agony to ecstasy, leaping from the glittery heights of disco divadom to the rampaging ugliness of speed-metal to the refined feel of classical—while always remaining consistently Moby." Paul Evans, writing for Rolling Stone, found Moby still beholden to "the imperatives of his genre", while also observing "legitimate classical influence and a visceral Christian faith" that "elevate his art". In The Village Voice, Robert Christgau remarked: "Where in concert he subsumes rockist guitar and classical pretensions in grand, joyous rhythmic release, on album his distant dreams remain tangents." Everything Is Wrong was voted the third-best album of 1995 in The Village Voice's year-end Pazz & Jop critics' poll.

By 2002, Everything Is Wrong had sold over 180,000 copies in the United States.

== In popular culture ==
"God Moving Over the Face of the Waters" is featured in the trailer and closing moments of the 1995 film Heat. The song was also featured in the trailer for Syriana along with the 2023 film Gran Turismo.

"First Cool Hive" is featured in the final scene of the 1996 film Scream and again in the ending scene of the 2026 film Scream 7.

"When It's Cold I'd Like to Die" is featured in The Sopranos, at the end of the episode "Join the Club". Additionally, the song is featured in the first, fourth, and fifth seasons of Stranger Things. An instrumental version features at the end of the 2006 documentary film Deliver Us From Evil.

"Anthem" has also been featured in various movies and TV series, most notably in its remixed Cinematic Version—for example, in Michael Mann's 2006 movie Miami Vice. Interestingly, the soundtrack of that movie includes the original 1995 album version, not the remix that was first released on Moby's Everything Is Wrong: Non-Stop DJ Mix album in 1996.

"Feeling So Real" is featured twice in the 2025 film The Plague.

== Track listing ==
All tracks are written by Moby, except where noted.

No.	Title	Writer(s)	Length
1.	"Hymn"		3:17
2.	"Feeling So Real"		3:21
3.	"All That I Need Is to Be Loved"		2:45
4.	"Let's Go Free"		0:38
5.	"Everytime You Touch Me"		3:41
6.	"Bring Back My Happiness"		3:12
7.	"What Love?"		2:48
8.	"First Cool Hive"		5:17
9.	"Into the Blue"	Moby; Mimi Goese	5:33
10.	"Anthem"		3:27
11.	"Everything Is Wrong"		1:14
12.	"God Moving Over the Face of the Waters"		7:21
13.	"When It's Cold I'd Like to Die"	Moby; Goese	4:13
Total length:			46:47

Bonus disc: Underwater
No.	Title	Length
1.	"Underwater (Part 1)"	5:14
2.	"Underwater (Part 2)"	5:43
3.	"Underwater (Part 3)"	7:23
4.	"Underwater (Part 4)"	8:02
5.	"Underwater (Part 5)"	16:45
Total length:		43:07

== Personnel ==
Credits for Everything Is Wrong adapted from album liner notes.

- Moby – engineering, production, programming, writing
- Kochie Banton – vocals on "Feeling So Real" and "Everytime You Touch Me"
- Mimi Goese – lyrics and vocals on "Into the Blue" and "When It's Cold I'd Like to Die"
- Rozz Morehead – vocals on "Feeling So Real" and "Everytime You Touch Me"
- Myim Rose – vocals on "Feeling So Real"
- Saundra Williams – vocals on "Bring Back My Happiness"
- Nicole Zaray – vocals on "Feeling So Real"

Artwork and design

- Barbie – art direction
- Jill Greenberg – photography
- Slim Smith – layout

== Charts ==
Chart (1995)	Peak position
Dutch Albums (Album Top 100)	43
German Albums (Offizielle Top 100)	69
Scottish Albums (Official Charts)	31
UK Albums (Official Charts)	21
US Heatseekers Albums (Billboard)	21

== Certifications ==
Region	Certification	Certified units/sales
United Kingdom (BPI)	Silver	60,000^{^}
^{^} Shipments figures based on certification alone.

== Remix album ==
Everything Is Wrong: Non-Stop DJ Mix

Remix album by Moby
- Released: January 15, 1996
- Length: 119:34
- Label: Mute
- Producer: Moby

Moby chronology
Everything Is Wrong (1995)	Everything Is Wrong: Non-Stop DJ Mix (1996)	Rare: The Collected B-Sides 1989–1993 (1996)

Professional ratings
Review scores
Source	Rating
AllMusic	4/5 stars
Muzik	1.5/5
NME	8/10

A two-disc remix album entitled Everything Is Wrong: Non-Stop DJ Mix by Evil Ninja Moby or Everything Is Wrong: Mixed! Remixed! was released in January 1996 by Mute. The album was mixed by Moby from various remixes that were commissioned by the label.

=== Track listing ===
All tracks are written by Moby, except where noted.

Disc one: Hard Techno, Joyous Anthems & Quiet Ambience
No.	Title	Writer(s)	Length
1.	"First Cool Hive" (Minimal Version)		1:24
2.	"Feeling So Real" (Unashamed Ecstatic Piano Mix)		4:57
3.	"All That I Need Is to Be Loved" (Hard Trance Version)		5:14
4.	"Bring Back My Happiness" (Extended Mix)		2:49
5.	"Move" (Disco Threat Mix)		4:34
6.	"Everytime You Touch Me" (Pure Joy Mix)		4:00
7.	"Feeling So Real" (WestBam Mix)		5:49
8.	"Into the Blue" (Uplifting 4 Beat Mix)	Moby; Mimi Goese	4:49
9.	"Everytime You Touch Me" (NYC Jungle Mix)		3:45
10.	"Into the Blue" (Spiritual Mix)	Moby; Goese	8:45
11.	"Anthem" (Cinematic Version)		2:24
12.	"Everything Is Wrong" (Quiet Mix)		5:04
Total length:			53:34

Disc two: New York Hard House, Groovy Acid & Melodic Trance
No.	Title	Writer(s)	Length
1.	"Let's Go Free" (Reversal Mix)		0:33
2.	"Hymn (I Believe)"		5:59
3.	"Into the Blue" (Voodoo Child Mix)	Moby; Goese	3:57
4.	"Everytime You Touch Me" (Freestyle Version)		3:38
5.	"Bring Back My Happiness" (Josh Wink Mix)		1:55
6.	"Hymn" (Lucky Orgasm Mix)		5:10
7.	"Everytime You Touch Me" (Na Feel Mix)		4:23
8.	"Feeling So Real" (Old Skool Mix)		4:02
9.	"Hymn" (Menacing Mix)		4:12
10.	"Bring Back My Happiness" (Para Los Discos)		3:35
11.	"Into the Blue" (Simple Mix)	Moby; Goese	5:49
12.	"Move" (Electro Mix)		6:36
13.	"All That I Need Is to Be Loved" (Melodic Mix)		7:06
14.	"When It's Cold I'd Like to Die" (Instrumental)		9:05
Total length:			66:00

=== Charts ===
Chart (1996)	Peak position
Finnish Albums (Suomen virallinen lista)	40
Scottish Albums (Official Charts)	37
UK Albums (Official Charts)	25

=== Certifications ===
Region	Certification	Certified units/sales
United Kingdom (BPI)	Gold	100,000^{*}
^{*} Sales figures based on certification alone.
