= Instinct Dance =

Compilation album by Moby
- Released: December 1991
- Recorded: 1989–1991
- Genres: House, techno
- Length: 50:59
- Label: Instinct
- Producer: Moby

Moby chronology
Instinct Dance (1991)	Moby (1992)

Instinct Dance is a compilation album by Moby, collecting tracks previously released on singles under Moby's several pseudonyms. Two years later a similar compilation was released entitled Early Underground.

== Track listing ==
All tracks are written by Moby.

No.	Title	Writer(s)	Original release	Length
1.	"Party Time"	Barracuda	Barracuda 12" (1991)	4:13
2.	"Drug Fits the Face"	Barracuda	Barracuda 12" (1991)	3:50
3.	"Besame"	Barracuda	Barracuda 12" (1991)	3:42
4.	"Go (Original Mix)"	Moby	Mobility EP (1990)	6:33
5.	"Mobility"	Moby	Mobility EP (1990)	6:10
6.	"Rock the House"	Brainstorm	Brainstorm 12" (1991)	4:30
7.	"Move the Colours"	Brainstorm	Brainstorm 12" (1991)	4:04
8.	"Drop a Beat"	Brainstorm, then Moby	Brainstorm 12" (1991)	4:23
9.	"Voodoo Child (Remix)"	Voodoo Child	Voodoo Child 12" (1991)	3:55
10.	"Have You Seen My Baby?"	Voodoo Child, then Moby	Voodoo Child 12" (1991)	4:05
11.	"Permanent Green [*]"	Voodoo Child	Voodoo Child 12" (1991)	5:50

[*] Only on the CD edition
