= Next Is the E =

Single by Moby

from the album Moby
- Released: October 28, 1992
- Recorded: 1992
- Genre: Techno; house
- Length: 4:42
- Label: Instinct; Equator
- Songwriter(s): Moby
- Producer(s): Moby

Moby singles chronology
| "Drop a Beat" (1992) | "Next Is the E" (1992) | "I Feel It" / "Thousand" (1993) |
| "Next Is the E" (1992) | "I Feel It"/"Thousand" (1993) | "Move" (1993) |

Music video
- "Moby - Next Is the E" on YouTube

"Next Is the E" (alternately known as "I Feel It") is a song by American electronic musician Moby, released in October 1992 by labels Instinct and Equator as the third single from his self-titled debut album (1992). The single peaked at number eight on the US Billboard Hot Dance Music/Club Play chart. It was featured on the soundtrack of the 1992 film Cool World. In the United Kingdom, the track was renamed "I Feel It", due to Moby's record company's concerns over what appeared to be a reference to the drug ecstasy in the original title. Released as a double A-side single with "Thousand", it peaked at number 38 on the UK Singles Chart.

== Critical reception ==
In his weekly UK chart commentary, James Masterton wrote, "His first chart outing since ['Go'] is this, another semi-instrumental dance hit although in a rather more high powered vein. Maybe not a massive smash but worth seeing it in the charts if only to hope that he makes a return to Top of the Pops." Ian Gittins from Melody Maker named it Single of the Week. Andy Beevers from Music Week gave "I Feel It" a score of four out of five, adding, "A popular import from last year, this tough but melodic techno/house single finally gets a UK release courtesy of the new Pinnacle-owned Equator label. The inclusion of a new mix by Moby himself on the follow-up 12-inch should help sales, although do not expect a 'Go'-style crossover." Mandi James from NME said, "If all hell breaks loose and this record escapes overground, then it will undoubtedly be the ingenious 'Synthe Mix', with its strobe struck beats, fruity percussion, rub a dub vocals and strings of life, that will lead the way." Charles Aaron from Spin wrote, "Took a while to get me down the aisle, but Moby's best-yet techno hymn insistently testifies with skipping keyboards and Nicole Zaray's breathy invocation."

== Track listings ==
CD single (EX-247-2)
| No. | Title | Length |
|---|---|---|
| 1. | "Next Is the E" (edit) | 4:33 |
| 2. | "Next Is the E" (Victory mix) | 5:45 |
| 3. | "Next Is the E" (Synthe mix) | 7:00 |
| 4. | "Next Is the E (I Feel It)" | 5:59 |
| 5. | "Thousand" | 4:29 |
| 6. | "Next Is the E" (Cool World mix) | 3:34 |

12-inch single (EX-247-1)
| No. | Title | Length |
|---|---|---|
| 1. | "Next Is the E (I Feel It)" | 5:59 |
| 2. | "Next Is the E" (Synthe mix) | 7:00 |
| 3. | "Next Is the E" (edit) | 4:33 |
| 4. | "Next Is the E" (Victory mix) | 5:45 |
| 5. | "Thousand" | 4:26 |

CD single (AXISCD 001)
| No. | Title | Length |
|---|---|---|
| 1. | "I Feel It" (radio edit – Invisible Brothers mix) | 3:11 |
| 2. | "Thousand" | 4:26 |
| 3. | "I Feel It" (Contentious mix) | 6:02 |
| 4. | "I Feel It" (Synthe mix) | 6:59 |

12-inch single (AXIST 001)
| No. | Title | Length |
|---|---|---|
| 1. | "I Feel It" (I Feel It mix) | 5:55 |
| 2. | "I Feel It" (Synthe mix) | 7:00 |
| 3. | "Thousand" | 4:26 |
| 4. | "I Feel It" (Victory mix) | 5:45 |

Cassette single (AXISMC 001)
| No. | Title | Length |
|---|---|---|
| 1. | "I Feel It" (radio edit – Invisible Brothers mix) | 3:11 |
| 2. | "Thousand" | 4:26 |

== Charts ==
| Chart (1992–93) | Peak position |
|---|---|
| UK Singles (OCC) "I Feel It"/"Thousand" | 38 |
| UK Airplay (ERA) | 76 |
| UK Dance (Music Week) | 14 |
| UK Club Chart (Music Week) | 71 |
| US Dance Club Songs (Billboard) | 8 |
| US Dance/Electronic Singles Sales (Billboard) | 39 |
