= Brudenell Social Club =

Music venue in Hyde Park, Leeds, England

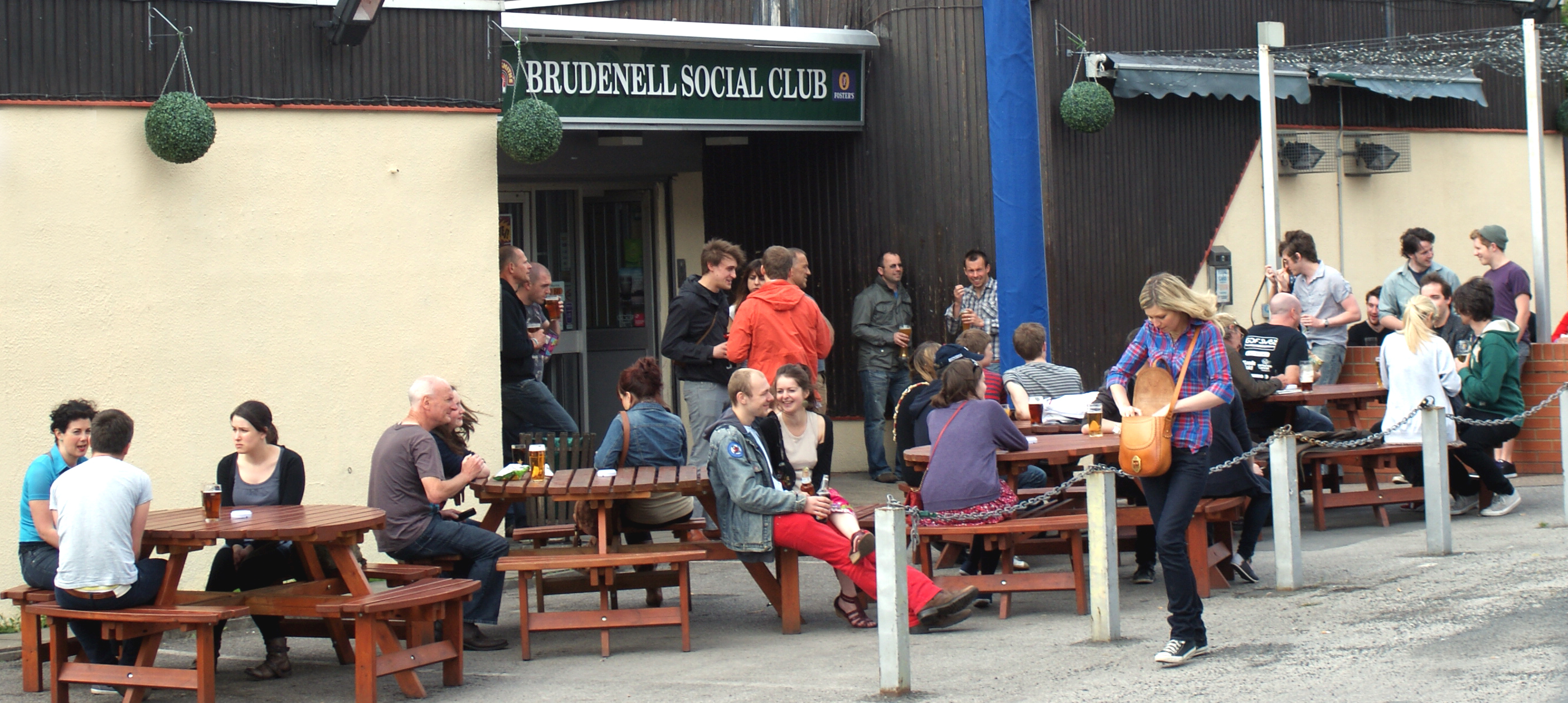
- The front entrance of the Brudenell Social Club.
- Interactive map of Brudenell Social Club
- Location: 33 Queen's Road, Leeds, England
- Coordinates: 53.810°N 1.570°W
- Seating type: Primarily standing, some seating
- Capacity: 400 (main room); 400 (Community room)
- Type: Music venue

Construction
- Opened: 2 December 1913; Demolished and rebuilt 1978; Reopened 7 December 1978

Website
- www.brudenellsocialclub.co.uk

The Brudenell Social Club is a live music venue and social club in Hyde Park, Leeds, England. While being a social enterprise, it retains the "community atmosphere of its origins as a working men's club". The club is split into three areas—a 400 capacity concert room, a bar area and games room section (which occasionally holds gigs) and a second 400 capacity concert area, known as the Community Room, which opened in 2017.

The club was originally formed in 1913 by local businessmen, who built a wooden clubhouse at 33 Queen's Road which opened on 2 December of the same year. After falling into disrepair, this wooden structure was replaced by the present brick building at the cost of £160,000 in 1978, with the club officially reopening on 7 December. The Clark family took on the club's license in 1992 and began to put on gigs after a shift in the makeup of Hyde Park's population caused by more students moving into the area. Initial shows were focused around the local DIY music scene.

From 2004 to 2005, noise complaints forced the club to briefly abandon gigs. After a period of fundraising, soundproof firedoors were purchased and installed, while a new public address system was added to the concert room as a result of a National Lottery grant. A few years later, in 2007, the Brudenell moved from being a member's club to being a "publicly open, licensed place that runs as a social enterprise and reinvests its money".

The club has played host to "secret gigs" by the likes of Kaiser Chiefs and Franz Ferdinand, hosted the Cribs as they played three-consecutive nights, billed as "Cribsmas", in December 2007 and celebrated its 100th anniversary in December 2013, with shows by the Wedding Present, the Fall and ¡Forward, Russia! among others.

A "primary cog in the Leeds music scene", the Brudenell Social Club was joint winner of the best live music venue in 2014's Rock the House competition, and was shortlisted for The Fly magazine's 2014 UK Venue of the Year' award and the NME's Britain's Best Small Venue award in 2011, 2012 and 2015. In 2024 they won the 'Inspirational Venue of the Year for under 500 capacity' award at the inaugural Northern Music Awards.

== History ==
Although exact details regarding its foundation are unknown, it is believed that the Brudenell Social Club (Note: The name is said to derive from the Brudenell family, who owned much of the land in the area from the 1670s until 1888) was started by a group of businessmen who wanted to create an unaffiliated club, free from ties to political parties or any other kind of movement. These businessmen formed the Brudenell as a "social and recreational club" in November 1913, and initially intended to build a clubhouse several hundred yards from the eventual location, on land which would later be used to construct the Hyde Park Picture House. However, after this plan failed to come to fruition, (Note: It has been speculated that a clubhouse could not be built on the site that would be used for Hyde Park Picture House due to a covenant put in place by the Brudenell family, which forbade licensed establishments from being built within a certain radius of their manor house. The Brudenells were absentee landlords and never actually lived in Leeds beyond brief stays at Headingley Hall, the mediaeval manor house on what is now Shire Oak Road. Two public houses, the Original Oak and Skyrack, have been open on Otley Road, opposite Headingley Hall, since at least the 18th century, with both buildings being owned by the Brudenell family.) a clubhouse was built at 33 Queen's Road, on the site of the present club's car park. Subsequently, this clubhouse opened on 2 December 1913.

The original wooden structure had fallen into disrepair by 1978 and was replaced by the present "modern-style" brick building at a cost of £160,000. The Brudenell Social Club reopened on 30 November 1978, with an official opening taking place on 7 December featuring performances from comedian Bobby Knutt and trio The Jady Jays. On reopening, the club permitted female members for the first time in its history, although only men were allowed in the billiards and games room. The Brudenell's new "cabaret-style" concert room featured live entertainment on Friday, Saturday and Sunday nights and, according to The Stage's Northern correspondent Jim Daley, the club became "one of the most popular in the Leeds area" during the year after its reopening, with entertainments manager Jack Swithenbank "engaging known acts who provide value for money".

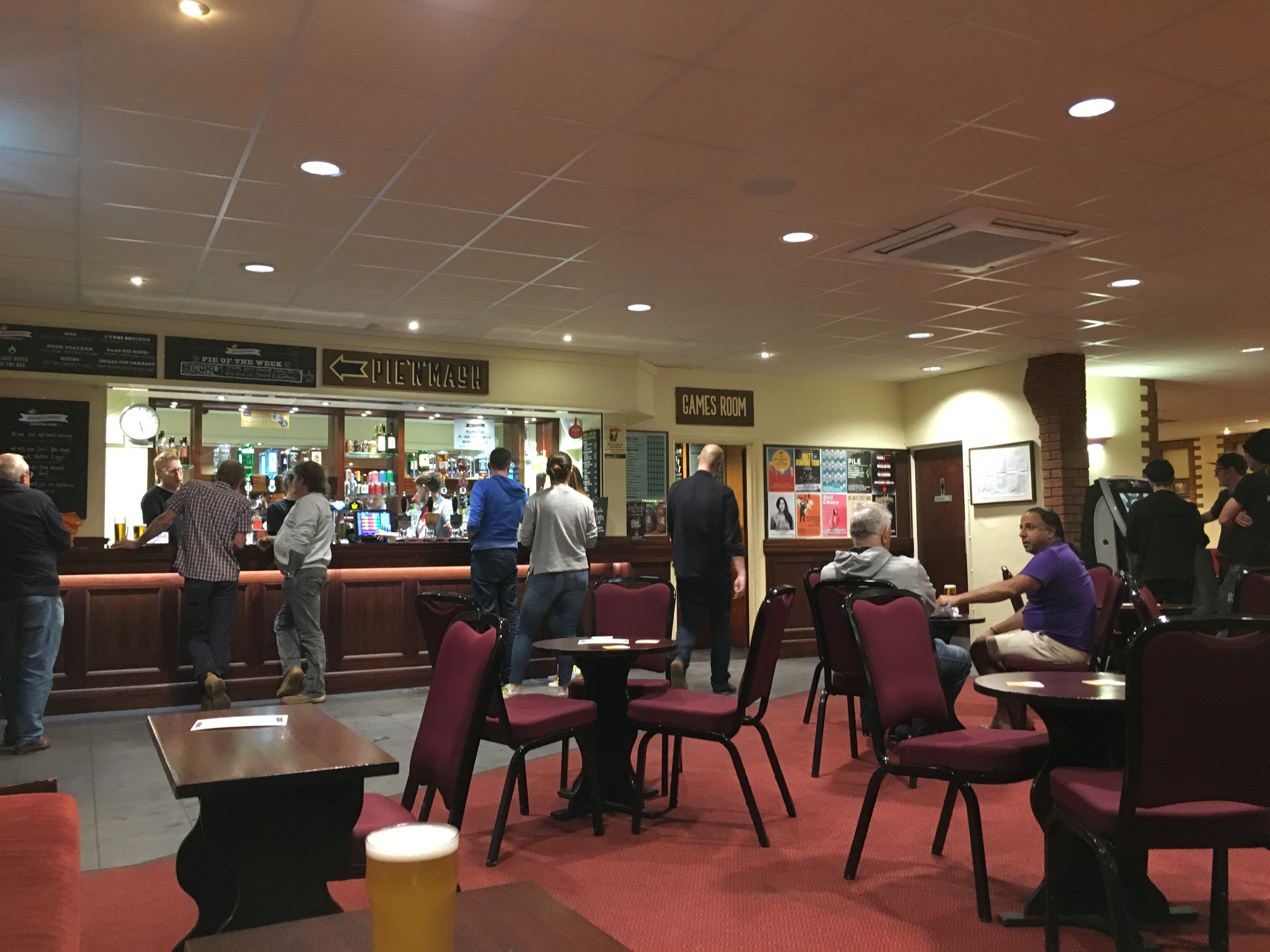
The main bar area at Brudenell Social Club, pictured in May 2017.

Malcolm and Patricia Clark became the Brudenell's licensees in 1992 after the committee who previously ran the club built up debts with the Inland Revenue, and, following a shift in the makeup of the local population which saw large numbers of students moving into the area, "rescued [the club] from financial ruin" by putting on bands. Gigs were initially staged by the likes of Mike Jolly, founder of the Holbeck-based Cloth Cat music charity, and members of the scene surrounding local DIY fanzine Cops & Robbers. The Termite Club also ran at the venue, hosting noise rock events. During the 1995 Hyde Park riots, the club staged a lock-in as local taxis were unable to operate. The Brudenell later hosted initial meetings by the group that set up Unity Day, a community festival created to "celebrate the people, culture and community of LS6" in the wake of the unrest. The Clarks' son, Nathan, took over the running of the club in 2004 after his father fell ill. (Note: According to Simpson's 2020 article, Nathan Clark took over the running of the club in 2003)

In 2004–2005 the Brudenell was placed on a "final warning" following noise complaints and had to stop putting on shows. The club ran quizzes and "Bullseye nights", sold badges and, in July 2005, hosted the 'Keep the Brudenell A-Live Aid' all-day gig in order to raise enough money to purchase expensive acoustic fire doors. The success of this fundraising activity prompted an application for a National Lottery grant to purchase a new public address system for the concert room. In response to a change in the United Kingdom's licensing laws and the smoking ban implemented in England in 2007, which made it illegal to smoke in enclosed work places, the Brudenell moved from being a member's club to an entirely public venture—"a not for profit company that still has the same aims as the club always had [...] a publicly open, licensed place that runs as a social enterprise and reinvests its money"—with Nathan believing that the venue had to "evolve or die".

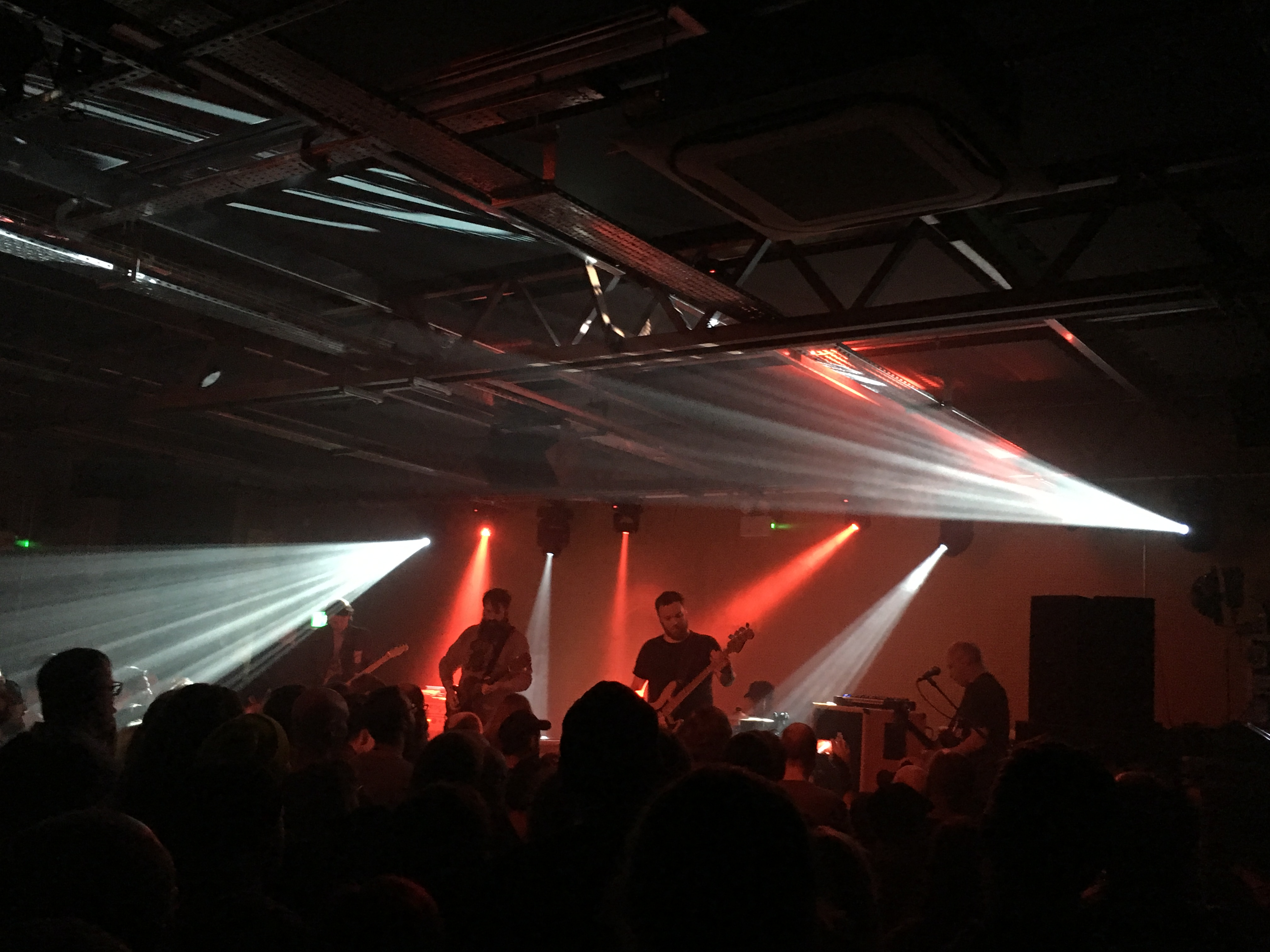
Mogwai officially opened the Community Room on 7 September 2017.

Unlike many social clubs in the United Kingdom, the Brudenell has never been part of the Working Men's Club and Institute Union, which Clark believes has enabled the venue to be more flexible than may otherwise have been the case. All profits are reinvested—staff are paid a "living wage", and the club has been able to make improvements, such as installing new toilets and showers, and upgrading the dressing rooms, which Clark feels make the club of a higher quality than other venues "putting on similar gigs". The building itself has been "paid for", which means that the club does not have to worry about rent increases.

The club is split into three areas—an amphitheatre-shaped 400 capacity concert area to the left of the entrance doors, with a bar area and games room (which occasionally holds gigs) and second, 400 capacity square-shaped concert area, the Community Room, to the right. The bar "retains the atmosphere of [a] working men's club", offering "comfortable" chairs, Sky television, a pool table and dartboard. The venue serves cask ales alongside speciality beers from around the world, and works with local companies, such as Kirkstall Brewery, to sell beer at competitive prices. In March 2017 the Brudenell announced plans to build a single storey extension; including extra space for gigs and community groups to meet; and a new toilet block with disabled access. This extension, named the Community Room, opened on 6 September 2017, hosting a performance from Waxahatchee. An official opening took place the following day when Mogwai played a show to support the release of their ninth studio album, Every Country's Sun.

As a result of the COVID-19 pandemic, in 2020 the Brudenell endured a prolonged period of closure. During this time, the club released a series of t-shirts, featuring the name "Brudenell Social Distancing Club"—a pun on the social distancing public health measures in place in the UK at the time—in an attempt to "support the local community in a time like this, and spread a positive message". All proceeds from sales of the t-shirts went to the artists who designed them. In June 2020, the club received £23,600 emergency funding from Arts Council England to help alleviate financial pressures caused by the pandemic. Later in the year, a further £220,429 was provided by the UK government's Culture Recovery Fund to help the Brudenell "host a free weekly event as well as livestreams".

The club's current logo, which appears on T-shirts promoting the venue, features Charlie, a King Charles Spaniel owned by the Clarks, who is often present behind the bar.

== Booking policy ==
The Brudenell regularly showcases an "eclectic mix of up-and-coming bands, hip or soon-to-be-influential names and the acts that first inspired them, from punk to hip-hop", with around 75% of shows being put on by Nathan Clark himself. The venue has been described as a "primary cog in the Leeds music scene".

Speaking about the club's booking policy to the BBC's Michael Savage in January 2017, licensee and general manager Nathan Clark stated that he believes audiences come back to the venue because "they have a degree of trust" in the Brudenell's taste when it comes to selecting bands to play the venue. Clark also stated that the club tries to support "good local artists", recommending them to touring bands and receiving tips from these musicians in return about "what's happening in their town".

According to Clark, every band that plays the venue is "treated the same, regardless of their status" and, unlike many venues in the UK, the Brudenell does not ask for a cut of the money bands make from selling merchandise, such as CDs and T-shirts, during and after shows. Clark believes that these factors, combined with little touches such as "the wifi being personalised" and giving acts use of a microwave and washing facilities, result in bands being keen to return to play at the Brudenell—something which the venue encourages as it tries "build relationships for the long term" with performers.

== Notable performances ==
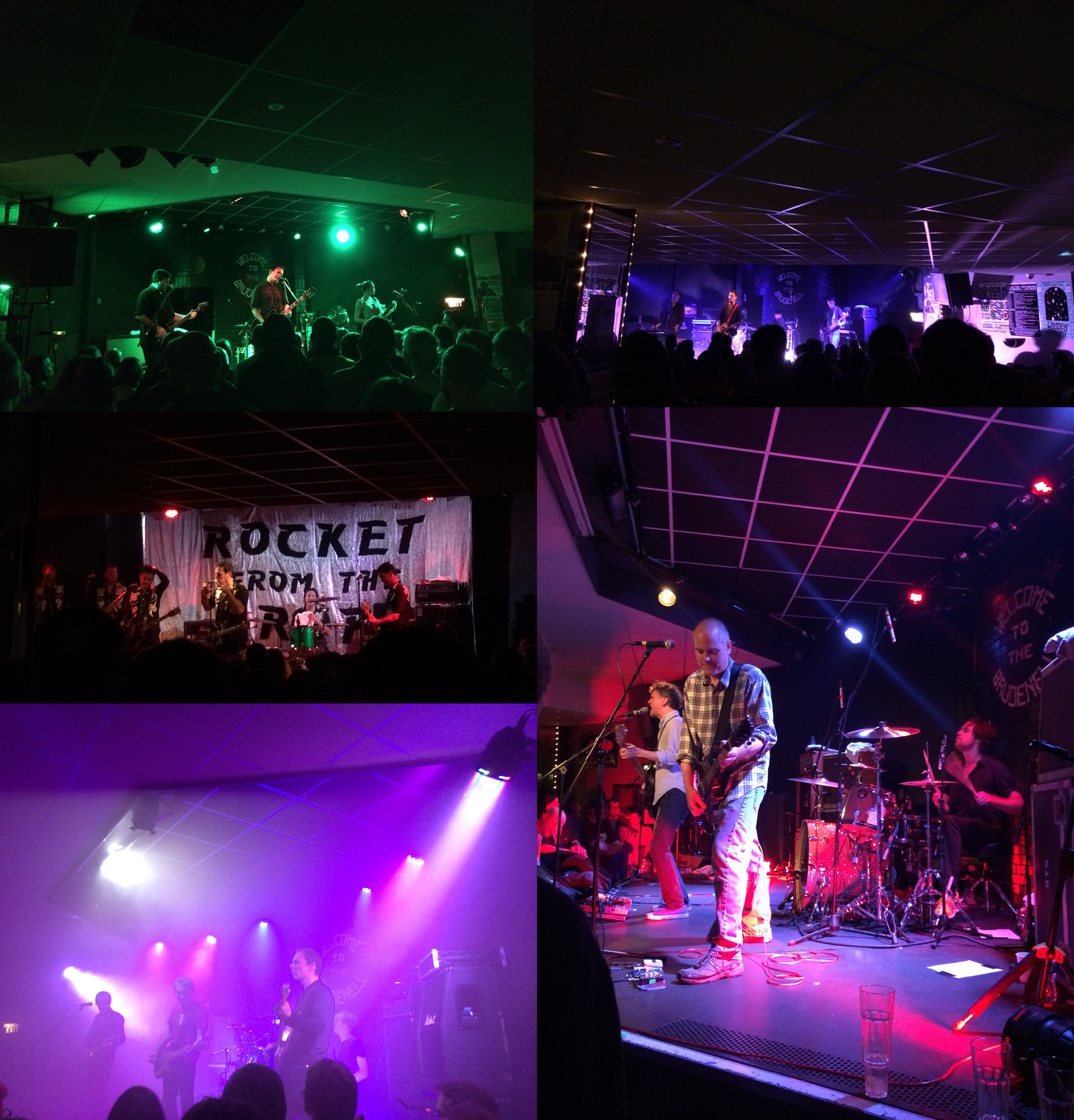
The Brudenell Social Club celebrated its 100th anniversary in December 2013 with an "eclectic mixture" of shows. Clockwise from top left: The Wedding Present, Girls Against Boys, Superchunk, Loop, and Rocket from the Crypt.

Franz Ferdinand played a "secret gig" at the Brudenell in 2004, and a year later, on 20 October 2005, Kaiser Chiefs played a free "secret gig" at the venue, with doors opening at 12pm, to celebrate the birthdays of drummer Nick Hodgson as well as Ryan and Gary Jarman from The Cribs. Tom Jones played an "intimate album launch show" at the Brudenell on 31 August 2021 in support of his album Surrounded by Time.

The Cribs played three consecutive nights at the Brudenell in December 2007. Billed as "Cribsmas", the shows saw the band performing material from each of the three albums they had released up to that point—The Cribs, The New Fellas and Men's Needs, Women's Needs, Whatever—along with associated b-sides. Support for the shows came from Kaiser Chiefs, Franz Ferdinand and Kate Nash. In December 2008, the Cribs released a triple DVD of their "Cribsmas" shows as Live At The Brudenell Social Club. Ten years later, in December 2017, The Cribs played a five night residency at the Brudenell.

To celebrate the 100th anniversary of the venue in December 2013, an "eclectic mixture" of acts were booked to showcase a range of musical genres that "expressed the values" of the Brudenell as a music venue; The Wedding Present, The Fall, Girls Against Boys, Loop and Rocket from the Crypt were among the bands who played at these anniversary shows. Leeds band ¡Forward, Russia! also played as part of the celebrations following their brief 2013 reformation.

In a 2013 interview with the Yorkshire Evening Post's Duncan Seaman, Clark stated that shows by Tune-Yards, Edwyn Collins, Tom Tom Club and a double-bill featuring Explosions in the Sky and Four Tet are amongst his favourite performances at the club. Clark has also highlighted a performance by American garage rock band Thee Oh Sees in the games room and The Cribs' December 2007 shows as being particularly memorable.

== Awards ==
In 2014, the Brudenell was joint winner with Base Studios in Stourbridge of the Best Live Music Venue category in that year's Rock the House competition, and was shortlisted for The Fly magazine's UK Venue of the Year award. It has also been nominated several times for the NME's Britain's Best Small Venue award, being shortlisted in the North East category in 2011 and 2012, and in the Yorkshire & Humberside category in 2015.

In September 2016, general manager Nathan Clark was recognised with an INDIE50 listing for his work promoting live music at the Brudenell. The award, set up by online ticket sellers WeGotTickets, was designed to celebrate the "unsung idols of live music at a grassroots level". The Brudenell won the inaugural 'Grassroots Venue: Spirit of the Scene' award at the 2017 Music Week awards and was also presented with the award in 2021 and 2023. The venue won the 'Best Venue Teamwork' award for clubs with a capacity of under 800 at the 2017 and 2019 Live Music Business Awards. Clark also won the 'Indie Promoter of the Year (Local impact)' award at the 2019 Live Music Business Awards.

== Bibliography ==
- Baron, John (18 August 2010). "Bookmarked: Hyde Park set for its 15th Unity Day". The Guardian. Archived from the original on 17 September 2016.
- Bevan, Nathan (2 September 2021). "Sir Tom Jones just played an intimate gig to only a few hundred people and it looked incredible". Wales Online. Archived from the original on 19 August 2022.
- Bradford, Eveleigh (2008). Headingley, This Pleasant Rural Village: Clues to the Past. Jeremy Mills Publishing. ISBN 978-1906600327.
- "About The Brudenell Social Club". The Brudenell Social Club. Archived from the original on 21 September 2016.
- Bychawski, Adam (3 December 2008). "Cribs to release 'Cribsmas' DVD". NME. Archived from the original on 1 July 2016.
- Bychawski, Adam (14 June 2011). "Regional winners announced in NME's search for Britain's Best Small Venue". NME. Archived from the original on 1 July 2016.
- Bychawski, Adam (1 May 2012). "NME's search for Britain's Best Small Venue in association with JD Roots: shortlist revealed". NME. Archived from the original on 1 July 2016.
- Chapman, Daniel (4 December 2013). "The Brudenell at 100: Nathan Clark Interview Part 1". The City Talking. Archived from the original on 1 July 2016.
- Chapman, Daniel (5 December 2013). "The Brudenell at 100: Nathan Clark Interview Part 2". The City Talking. Archived from the original on 1 July 2016.
- Chapman, Daniel (6 December 2013). "The Brudenell at 100: Nathan Clark Interview Part 3". The City Talking. Archived from the original on 1 July 2016.
- Daley, Jim (29 December 1978). "Clubland Favourites Turn Up in Yorkshire Pantomimes: Jim Daley in the North". The Stage. No. 5098. p. 5.
- Daley, Jim (19 July 1979). "Another Walton Hall to Go on the Showbiz Map: Jim Daley in the North". The Stage. No. 5127. p. 7.
- Daley, Jim (28 December 1979). "Audiences Tire of the Same Old Faces – Variety Shows Could Take Over". The Stage. No. 5150. p. 6.
- Darlington, Susan (10 September 2017). "Gig review: Waxahatchee and Allison Crutchfield & The Kizz, Brudenell Social Club, Leeds". Yorkshire Evening Post. Archived from the original on 29 September 2017.
- Emina, Seb (5 April 2009). "Late-night pubs and social clubs". The Guardian. Archived from the original on 17 September 2016.
- Gumble, Daniel (5 April 2017). "2017 Music Week Awards: And the winners are..." Music Week. Archived from the original on 11 April 2017.
- Hanley, James (23 April 2018). "The Social Network: Brudenell Social Club". Music Week. pp. 28–29.
- Haynes, Gavin (25 January 2008). "The Cribs; Brudenell Social Club, Leeds, Wednesday 19 to Friday 21 Dec". NME. Archived from the original on 1 July 2016.
- Hudson, Neil (13 September 2016). "Music maestro hit top note". Yorkshire Evening Post. Archived from the original on 11 October 2016.
- Mason, JP (5 August 2020). "I'm Not Here — Episode 5, Part 1" (Podcast).
- James, Lauren (11 November 2014). "Brudenell Social Club". Time Out. Archived from the original on 20 August 2016.
- Jimmison, Gemma (24 April 2020). "Brudenell Social Club in Leeds launches t-shirts to support local music artists during coronavirus pandemic". Yorkshire Evening Post. Archived from the original on 30 July 2020.
- "Winners 2017". Live Music Business Awards. October 2017. Archived from the original on 13 October 2017.
- "Winners 2019". Live Music Business Awards. October 2019. Archived from the original on 9 March 2020.
- "Kaiser Chiefs play secret Leeds gig". NME. 20 October 2005. Archived from the original on 25 January 2017.
- "Finalists revealed in NME's search for Britain's Best Small Venue with Jack Daniel's". NME. 2 November 2015. Archived from the original on 7 October 2016.
- "Meet The Nominees For Britain's Best Small Venue 2015 – Part 1". NME. 4 November 2015. Archived from the original on 1 July 2016.
- "New award for unsung indie heroes announced". NME. 23 March 2016. Archived from the original on 29 October 2016.
- Paine, Andre (14 September 2021). "Music Week Awards 2021: All the winners at the biggest ever edition". Music Week. Archived from the original on 31 May 2023.
- Paine, Andre (25 May 2023). "Music Week Awards 2023: All the winners at our biggest ever industry celebration". Music Week. Archived from the original on 30 May 2023.
- Pantry, Lindsay (17 June 2020). "Struggling city arts organisations get a slice of £5m Arts Council cash for Yorkshire". Yorkshire Evening Post. Archived from the original on 30 July 2020.
- Reilly, Nick (12 October 2020). "Liverpool's legendary Cavern Club and Leeds' The Brudenell among venues to receive chunk of £257million coronavirus fund". NME. Archived from the original on 12 October 2020.
- Savage, Mark (23 January 2017). "Guess what? Not every music venue is under threat". BBC. Archived from the original on 24 January 2017.
- Seaman, Duncan (26 November 2013). "Music interview: 100 years of the Brudenell Social Club, Leeds". Yorkshire Evening Post. Archived from the original on 6 August 2016.
- Seaman, Duncan (19 December 2017). "Gig review: The Cribs and Nick Hodgson at Brudenell Social Club, Leeds". Yorkshire Evening Post. Archived from the original on 21 April 2018.
- Simon, Jos (2011). The Rough Guide to Yorkshire. Rough Guide. ISBN 978-1848366039.
- Simpson, Dave (8 July 2014). "The gig venue guide: Brudenell Social Club, Leeds". The Guardian. Archived from the original on 12 August 2016.
- Simpson, Dave (6 March 2020). "'Conga line around the car park!' A week in the life of a British venue". The Guardian. Archived from the original on 8 March 2020.
- Steel, Andrew (8 September 2017). "Gig review: Mogwai at Brudenell Social Club, Leeds". Yorkshire Evening Post. Archived from the original on 29 September 2017.
- "Rock the House award joy for Stourbridge music venue". Worcester News. 8 July 2014. Archived from the original on 11 August 2016.
- "Leeds music venue is tuning up for the start of extension work". Yorkshire Evening Post. 2 March 2017. Archived from the original on 2 March 2017.
