= Early Underground =

Compilation album by Moby
- Released: March 1993
- Genre: Techno
- Length: 71:48
- Label: Instinct
- Producer: Moby

Moby chronology
Moby (1992)	Early Underground (1993)	Ambient (1993)

Professional ratings
Review scores
Source	Rating
AllMusic	4/5 stars
The Rolling Stone Album Guide	3/5 stars
Spin Alternative Record Guide	7/10

Early Underground is a compilation album by American electronica musician Moby. It was released in March 1993 by Instinct Records. The album consists of tracks previously released by Moby under other pseudonyms such as Barracuda, Brainstorm, UHF, and Voodoo Child. A similar compilation, Instinct Dance, was released two years earlier by Instinct.

== Track listing ==
All tracks are written by Moby.

No.	Title	Original release	Length
1.	"Besame"	Instinct Dance (1991)	3:40
2.	"Rock the House"	Brainstorm 12" (1991)	4:29
3.	"Move the Colors"	Brainstorm 12" (1991)	4:03
4.	"UHF3" (originally "U.H.F.")	UHF 12" (1991)	5:13
5.	"Party Time"	Barracuda 12" (1991)	4:12
6.	"Protect Write"	UHF 12" (1991)	5:41
7.	"Go" (Original)	Mobility EP (1990)	6:13
8.	"Permanent Green"	Voodoo Child 12" (1991)	5:49
9.	"Voodoo Child" (Remix)	Voodoo Child (Remix) 12" (1991)	3:54
10.	"Drugs Fits the Face"	Barracuda 12" (1991)	3:49
11.	"Time Signature"	Mobility EP (1990)	4:09
12.	"Peace Head"	UHF 12" (1991)	5:14
13.	"Barracuda"	Barracuda 12" (1991)	5:48
14.	"Mobility"	Mobility EP (1990)	6:09
15.	"M-Four"	Voodoo Child 12" (1991)	3:25
Total length:			71:48

Sample credits

- "Permanent Green" contains a sample of "Get on the Floor" performed by Michael Jackson

== Personnel ==
Credits for Early Underground adapted from album liner notes.

- Moby – arrangement, production, writing

Artwork and design

- Stephanie Mauer – art direction
- Jill Greenberg – photography
