= Moby (album) =

Studio album by Moby
- Released: July 27, 1992
- Genre: Techno
- Length: 54:40
- Label: Instinct
- Producer: Moby

Moby chronology
Instinct Dance (1991)	Moby (1992)	Early Underground (1993)

Singles from Moby
- 1. "Go" Released: March 1991; 2. "Drop a Beat" Released: May 15, 1992; 3. "Next Is the E" Released: October 28, 1992; 4. "I Feel It" / "Thousand" Released: 1993

Moby (titled The Story So Far in the UK) is the debut studio album by American electronica musician Moby, released in July 1992 by record label Instinct.

== Content ==
The song listed as "Go" on the American and German editions is in fact a shortened version of the "Woodtick Mix".

"Thousand", a song only included on the German edition of the album, was listed in Guinness World Records for having the fastest beats-per-minute (BPM) tempo, clocking in at over 1,000 BPM, hence its name.

== Release ==
Professional ratings
Review scores
Source	Rating
AllMusic	5/5 stars
Christgau's Consumer Guide	(2-star Honorable Mention)
Entertainment Weekly	A−
Music Week	3/5 stars
NME	8/10
Q	4/5 stars
The Rolling Stone Album Guide	3/5 stars
Spin Alternative Record Guide	8/10

Moby was released by the New York-based independent label Instinct Records on July 27, 1992. In an interview with Billboard at the time of the album's release, Moby stated that "all the songs are at least a year old. It's not entirely reflective of where I'm coming from right now" and that "the label had the legal right to put it out, the best thing for me to do is view it as more a retrospective and get on with my life".

The album was issued without Moby's cooperation. In Martin James' book Moby < Replay – The Life and Times, Moby recalled that he was so angry about the release of the album that he actively spoke out against it in any promotional work. He went on to say:

The basic problem was that I had never wanted to put an album like this out. It was just a compilation with a few unreleased demos. Dance albums had always failed, I thought, because they didn't work over the full length of the record. Mostly they were singles collections which was exactly what I didn't want to do. At the time, the first Prodigy album (Experience) impressed me because they'd managed to create a full listening experience which encompassed various styles. This was the kind of vision I had for my debut album. But Instinct insisted on putting Moby out. Which kind of upset me a lot.

By 2016, however, Moby had softened his stance on Moby and its Instinct Records-issued follow-up Ambient somewhat, stating that he "really like[d] them almost as odd time capsules".

== Track listing ==
All tracks are written by Moby.

US edition
No.	Title	Length
1.	"Drop a Beat"	4:20
2.	"Everything"	4:52
3.	"Yeah"	5:49
4.	"Electricity"	3:29
5.	"Next Is the E"	4:42
6.	"Mercy"	5:44
7.	"Go"	3:37
8.	"Help Me to Believe"	6:33
9.	"Have You Seen My Baby?"	4:09
10.	"Ah Ah"	3:46
11.	"Slight Return"	4:30
12.	"Stream"	3:09
Total length:		54:40

German edition
No.	Title	Length
1.	"Everything"	4:52
2.	"Yeah"	5:49
3.	"Electricity"	3:29
4.	"Next Is the E"	4:42
5.	"Mercy"	5:44
6.	"Go"	3:37
7.	"Help Me to Believe"	6:33
8.	"Have You Seen My Baby?"	4:09
9.	"Ah Ah"	3:46
10.	"Slight Return"	4:30
11.	"Stream"	3:09
12.	"Thousand"	4:24
Total length:		54:44

UK edition – The Story So Far
No.	Title	Length
1.	"Ah Ah"	3:46
2.	"I Feel It" (Next Is the E Remix)	5:57
3.	"Everything"	4:52
4.	"Mercy"	5:44
5.	"Help Me to Believe"	6:32
6.	"Go" (Woodtick Mix)	6:32
7.	"Yeah"	5:48
8.	"Drop a Beat" (The New Version)	2:40
9.	"Thousand"	4:24
10.	"Slight Return"	4:29
11.	"Go" (Subliminal Mix Unedited Version)	4:28
12.	"Stream"	3:08
Total length:		58:20

== Personnel ==
Credits for Moby adapted from album liner notes.

- Moby – production, writing

Artwork and design

- Dave Brubaker – artwork, design
- Electric Muse Graphics – artwork, design
- Jill Greenberg – photography
