= Feeling So Real =

1994 single by Moby

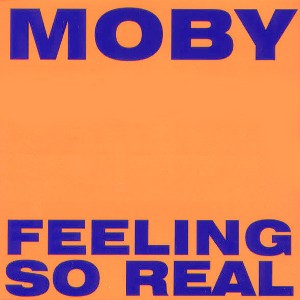

Single by Moby

from the album Everything Is Wrong
- B-side: "New Dawn Fades"
- Released: October 17, 1994
- Genre: Disco; house; hi-NRG
- Length: 3:21 (album version); 4:32 (single version)
- Label: Elektra; Mute
- Songwriter: Moby
- Producer: Moby

Moby singles chronology
"Hymn" (1994)	"Feeling So Real" (1994)	"Everytime You Touch Me" (1995)

Music video
- "Feeling So Real" on YouTube

"Feeling So Real" is a song by American electronica musician Moby, released in October 1994, by Elektra and Mute Records, as the second single from the musician's third studio album, Everything Is Wrong (1995). The song, both written and produced by Moby, features the phrases "sound system rocking my....." (the full sample saying "sound system rocking my sieve") and "set it up DJ!" spoken by Kochie Banton, who also appears in Moby's following single, "Everytime You Touch Me". The guest vocalist for the song is Myim Rose. It peaked at number 30 on the UK Singles Chart, number nine on the US Billboard Dance Club Play chart, and number one on the Finnish Singles Chart for two weeks. The song's accompanying music video was directed by Julie Hermelin. Spin magazine ranked "Feeling So Real"/"Everytime You Touch Me" number one in their list of the 20 best singles of 1995.

== Release ==
The single's B-side is Moby's take on the Joy Division song "New Dawn Fades". It would later be included on the Joy Division tribute album A Means to an End: The Music of Joy Division, and Moby would go on to perform it live with New Order.

The remix CD contains all the separate parts (vocals, strings, drums, etc.) for "Everytime You Touch Me". Mute Records and Elektra held a competition where one had to use the parts to create a remix "in any style you want" and mail it in on digital audio tape (DAT) by November 18, 1994. The winning remixes were included on later singles.

== Critical reception ==
Larry Flick from Billboard magazine wrote, "Leave it to the brilliant mind of Moby to build a bridge uniting rave and classical music. Single has a majestic quality–particularly with its vocals, which have a decidedly operatic bend–that is as interesting to the ear as it is to the body." In his weekly UK chart commentary, James Masterton said, "Few techno singles seem to be complete these days without a gimmick, hence the remixing competition that accompanies this release." Ian Gittins from Melody Maker noted its "giddy, insatiable euphoria", calling it an "irresistible E-anthem (or, in New York parlance, Ex-anthem)". Melody Maker editors The Stud Brothers named it "a fairly crass powerbag stormer, complete with soul diva and full-on ragga-man". Pan-European magazine Music & Media commented, "In '91, 'Go' his version of the Twin Peaks theme, portrayed Moby as the cryptic one in the dance sphere. Now he's as "vulgarly" Euro as everybody else, but still with a wink."

Maria Jimenez, a Music & Media editor, stated, "Injected with virtually every vibe from techno to jungle to pop, Moby's latest single 'Feeling So Real' (Mute) flies high and fast.... allow yourself to be energised by the euphenic tone and electrifying sounds." Andy Beevers from Music Week gave it a score of four out of five, adding, "The high speed Original Mix of 'Feeling So Real' verges on hardcore and may be the least commercial Moby single for a long while. Slower versions broaden its appeal, but it is unlikely to match the last few releases." Johnny Cigarettes from NME remarked the "ridiculously frantic jungle mantra" at the beginning. Tim Jeffery from the Record Mirror Dance Update deemed it "another uplifting techno track with vocals from the slightly odd Moby, but does it have to be so fast?" Another editor, James Hamilton, described it as a "mind bogglingly frantic yet stratospherically soaring flyer strictly for speed freaks, with sweet girl cooed 'I'm feeling so real, take me away' repetition and some ragga 'step it up DJ' punctuation". Gareth Grundy from Select wrote, "It might be created by a teetotal Christian, but the hedonistic rush of 'Feeling So Real' encapsulates what plenty of people want from their nights out."

== Music video ==
A music video was produced to promote the single, directed by Julie Hermelin. It features Moby performing in an underground club intercut with scenes of skateboarders and females appearing among the graffiti-covered walls in the club. Some scenes also show Moby barechested on a lawn and being covered by ivy. As the song progresses, the musician and the crowd go completely wild, destroying his equipment. "Feeling So Real" was A-listed on German music television channel VIVA in February 1995. Same month, the video received "break out" rotation on MTV Europe.

== Legacy ==
American music magazine Spin ranked "Feeling So Real", together with "Everytime You Touch Me", number one in their list of the 20 best singles of 1995. In 2016, Billboard magazine ranked the song number 46 in their list of "Top 50 Weird & Funny Songs to Dance to".

== Track listings ==
- CD single (CDMUTE173)
1. "Feeling So Real" (Original Mix) – 4:32
2. "Feeling So Real" (Unashamed Ecstatic Piano Mix) – 5:59
3. "Feeling So Real" (Old Skool Mix) – 5:47
4. "New Dawn Fades" – 5:31
- CD single – remixes (LCDMUTE173)
1. "Feeling So Real" (WestBam Mix) – 5:53
2. "Feeling So Real" (Ray Keith Jungle Mix) – 5:01
3. "Feeling So Real" (Moby's Dub Mix) – 6:46
4. "Everytime You Touch Me" (Remix Parts) – 4:41
- 12-inch single (12MUTE173)
1. "Feeling So Real" (WestBam Mix) – 5:53
2. "Feeling So Real" (Original Mix) – 4:32
3. "Feeling So Real" (Ray Keith Remix) – 5:01
4. "Feeling So Real" (Old Skool Mix) – 5:47
5. "Feeling So Real" (Unashamed Ecstatic Piano Mix) – 5:59
- Cassette single (CMUTE173)
1. "Feeling So Real" (7" edit) – 3:22
2. "New Dawn Fades" – 5:31
- CD single (66180-2)
1. "Feeling So Real" (radio edit) – 3:10
2. "Feeling So Real" (Ecstatic) – 5:59
3. "Feeling So Real" (Old Skool) – 5:47
4. "Feeling So Real" (WestBam Remix) – 5:33
5. "Feeling So Real" (Moby's Dub) – 6:46
6. "New Dawn Fades" – 5:31
7. "Feeling So Real" (Main Mix) – 4:32
8. "Feeling So Real" (Ray Keith Remix) – 5:01
9. "Everytime You Touch Me" (Remix Parts) – 4:41
- 12-inch single (0-66180)
1. "Feeling So Real" (Old Skool Mix) – 5:47
2. "Feeling So Real" (Unashamed Ecstatic Piano Mix) – 5:59
3. "Feeling So Real" (Moby's Dub) – 6:46
4. "Feeling So Real" (WestBam Mix) – 5:33
5. "Everytime You Touch Me" (Remix Parts) – 4:41

== Charts ==
=== Weekly charts ===
Chart (1994–1995)	Peak position
Austria (Ö3 Austria Top 40)	21
Europe (Eurochart Hot 100)	54
Europe (European Dance Radio)	21
Finland (Suomen virallinen lista)	1
Germany (GfK)	14
Greece (Pop + Rock)	19
Ireland (IRMA)	21
Latvia (Latvijas Top 20)	7
Netherlands (Dutch Top 40)	10
Netherlands (Single Top 100)	12
Scottish Singles Sales (Official Charts)	30
Sweden (Sverigetopplistan)	40
Switzerland (Schweizer Hitparade)	7
UK Singles (Official Charts)	30
UK Dance (Official Charts)	17
UK Club Chart (Music Week)	22
US Dance Club Songs (Billboard)	9

=== Year-end charts ===
Chart (1995)	Position
Germany (Media Control)	83
Latvia (Latvijas Top 50)	58

== Release history ==
Region	Date	Format(s)	Label(s)	Ref.
United Kingdom	October 17, 1994	12-inch vinyl; CD; cassette	Mute	
Australia	October 31, 1994	12-inch vinyl; CD	Elektra	
Australia	December 12, 1994	Remix CD	Elektra	
