= Bring Back My Happiness =

Single by Moby

from the album Everything Is Wrong
- B-side: "In My Life"; "Alone"
- Released: September 5, 1995
- Genre: EDM
- Length: 3:12 (album version); 3:35 (single version)
- Label: Mute; Elektra
- Songwriter: Moby
- Producer: Moby

Moby singles chronology
"Into the Blue" (1995)	"Bring Back My Happiness" (1995)	"That's When I Reach for My Revolver" (1996)

Audio video
- "Bring Back My Happiness" on YouTube

"Bring Back My Happiness" is a song by American electronica musician Moby. It was released on September 5, 1995 by Mute and Elektra as the sixth and final single from his third studio album, Everything Is Wrong (1995). The single reached number 10 on the US Billboard dance chart.

The single cover for the song (and the video occasionally) features "Little Idiot", an animated character which would later appear on some music videos and single and album covers.

== Critical reception ==
In his review of Everything Is Wrong, Gareth Grundy from Select noted "the careering, diva-led house histrionics" of the track.

== Track listing ==
- CD single (66096-2)
1. "Bring Back My Happiness" (Extended Mix) – 3:35
2. "In My Life" – 3:35
3. "Bring Back My Happiness" (Para Los Discos Mix) – 5:08
4. "Bring Back My Happiness" (Underground Mix) – 5:44
5. "Bring Back My Happiness" (Josh Wink Mix) – 8:09
6. "Into the Blue" (Jr. Vasquez Mix) – 8:11
7. "Alone" – 10:49
- 12-inch single (0-66096)
1. "Bring Back My Happiness" (Extended Mix) – 3:35
2. "Bring Back My Happiness" (Para Los Discos) – 5:08
3. "Bring Back My Happiness" (Wink's Acid Interpretation) – 8:09
4. "Bring Back My Happiness" (Underground Version) – 5:44
- CD single (7243 4 72423 2 8)
1. "Bring Back My Happiness" (Extended Mix) – 3:35
2. "Bring Back My Happiness" (Voodoo Child Mix) – 4:14
3. "Bring Back My Happiness" (Wink's Acid Interpretation) – 8:09
4. "Bring Back My Happiness" (Para Los Discos Mix) – 5:08
5. "Bring Back My Happiness" (Interactive Mix) – 5:04

== Charts ==
Chart (1995–96)	Peak position
UK Club Chart (Music Week)	16
US Dance Club Songs (Billboard)	10
US Dance/Electronic Singles Sales (Billboard)	39
