= Join the Club =

- The Sopranos episode
- Episode no.: Season 6 Episode 2
- Directed by: David Nutter
- Written by: David Chase
- Cinematography by: Alik Sakharov
- Editing by: William B. Stich
- Production code: 602
- Original air date: March 19, 2006
- Running time: 54 minutes

Episode chronology
← Previous "Members Only"	Next → "Mayham"
- The Sopranos season 6

"Join the Club" is the 67th episode overall and the second episode of the sixth season of the HBO television drama series The Sopranos. Written by series creator/executive producer David Chase and directed by David Nutter, it premiered on March 19, 2006 in the United States. The episode had nearly nine million viewers on its premiere date, and critical reception was highly positive.

== Starring ==
- James Gandolfini as Tony Soprano / Kevin Finnerty
- Lorraine Bracco as Dr. Jennifer Melfi *
- Edie Falco as Carmela Soprano
- Michael Imperioli as Christopher Moltisanti
- Dominic Chianese as Corrado Soprano, Jr.
- Steven Van Zandt as Silvio Dante
- Tony Sirico as Paulie Gualtieri
- Robert Iler as Anthony Soprano, Jr.
- Jamie-Lynn Sigler as Meadow Soprano
- Aida Turturro as Janice Soprano Baccalieri
- Steven R. Schirripa as Bobby Baccalieri
- Joseph R. Gannascoli as Vito Spatafore
- Dan Grimaldi as Patsy Parisi

* = credit only

=== Guest starring ===
- Jerry Adler as Hesh Rabkin

=== Also guest starring ===
- Sharon Angela as Rosalie Aprile
- Ho Chow as Monk #2
- Tony Darrow as Larry Barese
- Danielle Di Vecchio as Barbara Soprano Giglione
- Robert Funaro as Eugene Pontecorvo
- Will Janowitz as Finn DeTrolio
- Michael Kelly as Agent Goddard
- Sheila Kelley as Allison Crider
- C.S. Lee as Dr. Ba
- Ron Leibman as Dr. Lior Plepler
- Arthur J. Nascarella as Carlo Gervasi
- Henry O as Monk #1
- Matt Servitto as Agent Harris
- Maureen Van Zandt as Gabriella Dante
- Wendy Hammers as Fake Carmela (voice)
- Suzanne Di Donna as Deanne Pontecervo
- Danny Johnson as Detective DeLeon
- Ted Koch as Detective Klinger
- Taleb Adlah as Ahmed
- Donnie Keshawarz as Muhammad
- Lee R. Sellars as Salesman
- Christopher Evan Welch as ER Doctor
- Jay Edwards as Psychologist
- Edward Watts as Bartender
- Emily Vaughan as Conference Center Host
- Morgan Saylor as Young Meadow (voice)
- Thomas Russo as Robbie Pontecorvo
- Grace Van Patten as Ally Pontecorvo
- Jason Loftus as Bell Hop
- Amy Kean as TV Reporter
- Brianna and Kimberly Laughlin as Domenica Baccalieri
- Austin Jones as Omni Clerk
- Anjali Bhimani as Dr. Budraja
- Eli Harris as Camera Man

== Synopsis ==
Two days after being shot by Junior, Tony remains in an induced coma. Doctors encourage Carmela and others to talk to him and play music in hope of recovery. However, they also warn that he could die or be left with brain damage. Carmela, Christopher, Meadow and Barbara keep a vigil over Tony, while Janice sobs uncontrollably whenever she sees him. Meanwhile, a confused Junior is held in custody and denies that he shot his nephew. At Eugene’s wake, Silvio assumes Tony's responsibilities as acting boss; it is decided to cut Junior off from the Soprano family, making Tony the official boss if he survives. Chris, Paulie and Vito vie for small opportunities to assist Tony's family during the crisis, such as sending presents to his room and bickering over giving a ride home to A.J.

Alone with Tony, Carmela passionately expresses her love for him. Meadow reads him a translation of the poem Pater Noster by Jacques Prévert. A.J. becomes increasingly withdrawn and avoids Tony's hospital room, claiming to have a stomach flu. He admits to Meadow that he is embarrassed and angered by the actions of his family. A.J. finally gathers enough courage to talk to his father when they are alone, and vows to kill Junior. Afterward, he admits to Carmela that he has flunked out of college. She looks at him in stunned disbelief but holds in her anger and sends him away.

At Satriale's Pork Store, Chris encounters FBI Agents Dwight Harris and Ron Goddard, who ask him to pass along any information he might hear about terrorist activities. At the Bada Bing, he talks briefly with two Arab men who are now regulars there.

While he is in a coma, Tony has a long dream-like experience that is woven through the episode.

Tony awakens as a precision optics salesman, without his New Jersey accent, in a hotel room in Costa Mesa, California. That night, he notices a strange beacon of light on the horizon as he looks out the window, and at the hotel bar watches a news report about a nearby brush fire. The next morning, Tony goes to a convention and is asked for ID to gain admittance. He realizes that he has someone else's wallet and briefcase, belonging to a man named Kevin Finnerty of Kingman, Arizona, to whom he bears a resemblance.

When Tony returns to a bar where he thinks he unintentionally picked up these items, some business travelers overhear him telling his story to the bartender who, when asked what Costa Mesa is like, replies, "Around here, it's dead." The group invite Tony to join them for dinner, during which he discusses his "life" in more detail, alluding to a midlife crisis. As he and his group leave, Tony notices a religious commercial on TV, which shows the question, "Are sin, disease, and death real?" Outside the hotel, Tony makes a pass at a woman from the group. She responds at first but then cuts him off, telling him she saw his face when he got off the phone with his wife (whose voice is not Carmela's). Suddenly, a helicopter spotlight (the lights of the hospital surgery room) shines on the pair. The woman says, "They’re looking for a perp."

Tony briefly awakens from his coma and rips out his breathing tube. The dream resumes when he is placed in another coma.

Tony checks into a different hotel under Finnerty's name. Two Buddhist monks overhear him checking in and, thinking he is Finnerty, confront him over installing a faulty heating system at their monastery. Tony tells them that he's not Finnerty, which angers the monks; they scuffle briefly and the monks flee, leaving Tony shocked at the violence. The next morning, the hotel elevator is out of order, so Tony takes the stairs. As he is walking down, he slips and falls; when brought to an emergency room, he is told by the doctor that aside from having a minor concussion, his MRI scan shows some dark spots on his brain caused by lack of oxygen. The doctor states that this indicates early stages of Alzheimer's disease. When the doctor leaves him, Tony says, "I'm lost" to himself. After he returns to his hotel room, he picks up the phone but hangs up before dialing, while the beacon flashes on the horizon.

== First appearances ==
- Ahmed and Muhammad: Associates of Christopher Moltisanti who hang out at the Bada Bing.

== Production ==
- Most interior hospital scenes of the episode were filmed at the North Hollywood Medical Center, Los Angeles, with additional exterior and interior scenes filmed at the New Jersey Institute of Technology.
- James Gandolfini uses his real voice in his comatose dream instead of Tony Soprano's strong Jersey accent.
- The interior of the hospital lunch room is actually "The Highlander Club" (formerly called "The Pub") inside the Campus Center at NJIT.
- The interior of the hospital is the same hospital from the TV show Scrubs.
- The credits do not mention the actress providing the voice of Tony's wife in his dream, though the writers have stated the voice is of a generic New Jersey actress and not intended to be anyone previously featured on the series. On the A&E syndication rebroadcast, the voice is credited on the closed captioning as 'Carmela's voice'.
- This episode was shown at the season's premiere party instead of the first installment, "Members Only."
- This is the only episode of the series directed by David Nutter and the eighth of nine episodes for which David Chase receives an individual writing credit.

== Music ==
- The song Carmela plays for Tony in the hospital first is "Smoke on the Water" by Deep Purple. This was the same song played in the series' second season premiere, "Guy Walks Into a Psychiatrist's Office...", in a scene where Tony crashed his truck into a barricade.
- The second song Carmela is heard playing in Tony's hospital room is "There's a Moon Out Tonight" by The Capris.
- The song Carmela says she was playing in Tony's car an entire weekend at Long Beach Island and now plays in his hospital room is "American Girl" by Tom Petty and The Heartbreakers.
- When Tony is waiting at the bar, "The Happy Organ" by Dave "Baby" Cortez can be heard. This song was also used in the season 3 episode "Fortunate Son."
- The song playing in Bada Bing is "Spitfire" by The Prodigy.
- The song playing at the end of the episode, where Tony returns to his hotel room and picks up the phone but ceases dialing, is Moby's "When It's Cold I'd Like to Die" with vocals by Mimi Goese. Just before that, while Tony is kicking off his shoes, an instrumental version of "Day After Day" is heard.

== Reception ==
"Join the Club" was watched by 9.18 million American viewers on its premiere date.

Since its premiere, "Join the Club" has been regarded by critics as one of the best episodes of the series. Edie Falco's performance was highly praised. Alan Sepinwall of The Star-Ledger ranked "Join the Club" among the ten best Sopranos episodes in 2007, calling it the "finest example of the show's deft blend of the metaphysical and the mundane." In his original 2006 review of the episode, Sepinwall found that Tony's dream was "much more linear and coherent" than dream sequences in past episodes and praised the acting of Michael Imperioli during the scene of Christopher embracing Carmela at the hospital. Television Without Pity graded the episode with an A. Its review noted about the scene of Janice's hysterical reaction to seeing Tony's wound: "She's got more drama than Inside the Actor's Studio." Lisa Schwarzbaum of Entertainment Weekly called Tony's dream sequence an "absorbing, poignant meditation on the path some parallel Tony Soprano might have taken."

However, former Costa Mesa mayor Peter Buffa found Tony's dream of being in Costa Mesa "strange", because he disagreed with the dialogue of a bartender suggesting that Costa Mesa lacked culture or social life.
