= Thousand (song) =

- Double A-side release with "I Feel It"

Single by Moby

from the album Moby
- Released: June 1993
- Recorded: 1992
- Genre: Techno; hardcore; speedcore
- Length: 4:24
- Label: Equator
- Songwriter: Moby
- Producer: Moby

Moby singles chronology
"Next Is the E" (1992)	"I Feel It" / "Thousand" (1993)	"Move" (1993)

Audio video
- "Thousand" on YouTube

"Thousand" is a song by American electronic musician Moby. It was released as a double A-side single with Moby's song "I Feel It" in the United Kingdom, serving as the fourth and final single released from his self-titled debut album.

"Thousand" was listed in Guinness World Records for having the fastest tempo in beats-per-minute (BPM) of any released single, peaking at approximately 1,015 BPM.

The vocal sample is taken from First Choice's 1977 song, "Let No Man Put Asunder".

== Track listings ==
CD single (AXISCD 001)
No.	Title	Length
1.	"I Feel It" (radio edit – Invisible Brothers mix)	3:11
2.	"Thousand"	4:26
3.	"I Feel It" (Contentious mix)	6:02
4.	"I Feel It" (Synthe mix)	6:59

12-inch single (AXIST 001)
No.	Title	Length
1.	"I Feel It" (I Feel It mix)	5:55
2.	"I Feel It" (Synthe mix)	7:00
3.	"Thousand"	4:26
4.	"I Feel It" (Victory mix)	5:45

Cassette single (AXISMC 001)
No.	Title	Length
1.	"I Feel It" (radio edit – Invisible Brothers mix)	3:11
2.	"Thousand"	4:26

== Charts ==
Chart (1993)	Peak position
UK Singles (Official Charts) "I Feel It"/"Thousand"	38
