= Mobility (song) =

Single by Moby
- B-side: "Go"; "Time Signature"
- Released: September 1990
- Length: 6:10
- Label: Instinct
- Songwriter(s): Moby
- Producer(s): Moby

Moby singles chronology
"Mobility" (1990)	"Go" (1991)

Audio video
- "Mobility" on YouTube

"Mobility" is a song by American electronic musician Moby. It was released as his debut single by Instinct Records in September 1990.

"Go", the single's B-side, would later be remixed by Moby and released as his second single in 1991. Tracks from the single were also included on the compilations Instinct Dance (1991) and Early Underground (1993).

== Track listing ==
12-inch single (EX-226)
No.	Title	Length
1.	"Mobility"	6:10
2.	"Mobility" (Aquamix)	4:35
3.	"Go"	6:15
4.	"Time Signature"	4:10
