= Everytime You Touch Me =

1995 single by Moby

Single by Moby

from the album Everything Is Wrong
- B-side: "The Blue Light of the Underwater Sun"
- Released: February 13, 1995
- Genre: Disco
- Length: 3:41 (album version); 3:55 (single version)
- Label: Elektra; Mute
- Songwriter: Moby
- Producer: Moby

Moby singles chronology
"Feeling So Real" (1994)	"Everytime You Touch Me" (1995)	"Into the Blue" (1995)

Music video
- "Moby - Everytime You Touch Me" on YouTube

"Everytime You Touch Me" is a song by American electronica musician Moby, released on February 13, 1995 by Mute and Elektra Records, as the third single from his third studio album, Everything Is Wrong (1995). Guest vocals on the song are performed by Rozz Morehead and Kochie Banton. It became a number-one hit in Finland and reached the top 20 in Ireland, Israel, the Netherlands, and Scotland, as well as on the Canadian RPM Dance chart. Its music video was directed by Julie Hermelin.

== Release ==
Before the release of the "Everytime You Touch Me" single, US and UK remix competitions were held (a "remix parts" track having been included on some versions of Moby's previous single, "Feeling So Real"). The winning remixes, made by Jude Sebastian (UK) and John Blackford (US), were included on various versions of the "Everytime You Touch Me" releases. In 2000, a 12-inch single was pressed in honor of the other remix contestants.

A related promotional EP entitled Disk was released by Elektra in 1995. It was issued as an enhanced CD with both standard audio tracks, music videos, and CD-ROM content. The disc has a program which allows users to remix "Everytime You Touch Me" and view QuickTime interview clips.

== Critical reception ==
Steve Baltin from Cash Box complimented the song as a "delightful disco number". Ian Gittins from Melody Maker named it "an ace rave-pop single assured of chart action". Dele Fadele from NME felt "the gilded electro-pop splinters" of the original was "too obviously commercial". Gareth Grundy from Select noted that "Moby weaves familiar Wagnerian rave-pop like 'Every Time You Touch Me'." Barry Walters for Spin wrote, "Soul sister Rozz Morehead rides the hyper-house beats like an old-school disco diva on the should-be dance floor smash".

== Music video ==
The accompanying music video for "Everytime You Touch Me" was directed by Julie Hermelin. She had previously directed the video for "Feeling So Real", which also featured Rozz Morehead.

== Track listings ==
- 12-inch single (12MUTE176)
1. "Everytime You Touch Me" (Uplifting Mix) – 5:23
2. "Everytime You Touch Me" (Jude Sebastian Mix) – 7:01
3. "Everytime You Touch Me" (NYC Jungle Mix) – 5:25
4. "Everytime You Touch Me" (Na Feel Mix) – 5:08
5. "Everytime You Touch Me" (Freestyle Mix) – 5:54
- 12-inch single (L12MUTE176)
1. "Everytime You Touch Me" (Totalis Remix) – 6:47
2. "Everytime You Touch Me" (Quatermass Remix) – 6:43
3. "Everytime You Touch Me" (Dementia Remix) – 5:38
4. "Everytime You Touch Me" (Tabernacle Remix) – 7:01
- 12-inch single (0-66154)
1. "Everytime You Touch Me" (Na Feel Mix) – 5:08
2. "Everytime You Touch Me" (Freestyle Mix) – 5:54
3. "Everytime You Touch Me" (NYC Jungle Mix) – 5:25
4. "Everytime You Touch Me" (Beatmasters 12" Mix) – 6:33
5. "Everytime You Touch Me" (John Blackford Mix) – 5:26
- CD single (CDMUTE176)
1. "Everytime You Touch Me" (Beatmasters 7" Mix) – 3:55
2. "The Blue Light of the Underwater Sun" – 4:22
3. "Everytime You Touch Me" (Jude Sebastian Mix) – 7:01
4. "Everytime You Touch Me" (Freestyle Mix) – 5:54
- CD single (LCDMUTE176)
1. "Everytime You Touch Me" (Uplifting Mix) – 5:23
2. "Everytime You Touch Me" (NYC Jungle Mix) – 5:25
3. "Everytime You Touch Me" (Na Feel Mix) – 5:08
4. "Everytime You Touch Me" (Pure Joy Mix) – 4:28
5. "Everytime You Touch Me" (Progressive Edit Mix) – 5:21
6. "Everytime You Touch Me" (Beatmasters Dub) – 6:25

== Charts ==
Chart (1995)	Peak position
Belgium (Ultratop 50 Flanders)	46
Canada Dance/Urban (RPM)	16
Europe (Eurochart Hot 100)	30
Europe (European Dance Radio)	1
Finland (Suomen virallinen lista)	1
Iceland (Íslenski Listinn Topp 40)	20
Ireland (IRMA)	17
Israel (Israeli Singles Chart)	18
Netherlands (Dutch Top 40)	18
Netherlands (Single Top 100)	25
Scottish Singles Sales (Official Charts)	20
UK Singles (Official Charts)	28
UK Dance (Official Charts)	10
UK Club Chart (Music Week)	16
UK Pop Tip Club Chart (Music Week)	39
US Dance Club Songs (Billboard)	17
US Dance Singles Sales (Billboard)	26

== Release history ==
Region	Date	Format(s)	Label(s)	Ref.
United Kingdom	February 13, 1995	12-inch vinyl; CD; cassette	Mute	
Australia	April 17, 1995	CD	WEA	
United States	May 9, 1995	Contemporary hit radio	Elektra	
