= All That I Need Is to Be Loved =

Single by Moby

from the album Move and Everything Is Wrong
- B-side: "Morning Dove","New Dawn Fades"
- Released: 1993
- Genre: House of Suffering Mix: Thrash metal; speed metal
- Length: 2:43
- Label: Mute; Elektra
- Songwriter(s): Moby
- Producer(s): Moby

Moby singles chronology
"Move" (1993)	"All That I Need Is to Be Loved" (1993)	"Hymn" (1994)

Audio video
- "All That I Need Is to Be Loved" on YouTube

"All That I Need Is to Be Loved" is a song by American musician Moby. It was first featured on the 1993 EP Move as "All That I Need Is to Be Loved (MV)" and was later released as a 12" vinyl single. The song "Where You End" from Hotel (2005) contains a sample from this. It was only released on vinyl, and there was no music video made for the song. In the UK it was only released as a promotional 12" single. The "House of Suffering" mix (or "H.O.S" mix), was featured on his 1995 studio album Everything Is Wrong. "All That I Need Is To Be Loved" is the only Moby single which is released from another single or EP.

== Critical reception ==
The Stud Brothers from Melody Maker described the song as "a maddened industrial metal, more Motorhead than Cubanate". Sam Wood from Philadelphia Inquirer wrote that it's "All That I Need to be Loved" "which stakes Moby's claim to history. Its simple verse could have been plucked directly from the Confessions of Saint Augustine. Bleating ecstatically, Moby repeats his joyful cry several times - and there's no doubt he means it".

== Track listing ==
- UK 12" promo single

A. "All That I Need Is to Be Loved" – 7:09
B. "Morning Dove" – 5:43

- US 12"

A1. "All That I Need Is to Be Loved (Vocal Dance Mix)" – 4:29
A2. "All That I Need Is to Be Loved (Speed Trance)" – 5:33
B1. "All That I Need Is to Be Loved (Moby Dub)" – 7:45
B2. "All That I Need Is to Be Loved (Flashin' Dub)" (remixed by Eddie Fowlkes) – 5:28

Note: The US vinyl was re-released in 2006 in digital form on Amazon.com (MP3) and iTunes (AAC).

- Czech Republic 12"

A1. "All That I Need Is to Be Loved (Moby Dub)" – 7:25
A2. "All That I Need Is to Be Loved (House of Suffering Mix)" – 2:45
AA1. "All That I Need Is to Be Loved (Vocal Dance)" – 4:39
AA2. "All That I Need Is to Be Loved (Speed Trance)" – 5:33

- US clear vinyl 7"

A. "All That I Need Is To Be Loved (House of Suffering Mix)" – 2:45
B. "New Dawn Fades" – 5:30
