= Drop a Beat =

Single by Moby

from the album Moby
- Released: May 15, 1992
- Length: 4:20
- Label: Instinct
- Songwriter(s): Moby
- Producer(s): Moby

Moby singles chronology
"Go" (1991)	"Drop a Beat" (1992)	"Next Is the E" (1992)

Audio video
- "Drop a Beat" on YouTube

"Drop a Beat" is a song by American electronica musician Moby, released in May 1992 by Instinct Records as the second single from his self-titled debut album (1992). The single peaked at number six on the US Billboard Hot Dance Club Play chart.

== Critical reception ==
Rupert Howe from Select noted that "tension is ever-present" on 'Drop a Beat', calling it a "raging rave signal".

== Track listing ==
CD single (EX-240-2)
No.	Title	Length
1.	"Drop a Beat"	4:21
2.	"Drop a Beat" (Deep Mix)	5:57
3.	"Electricity"	3:27
4.	"UHF 2"	4:59

12-inch single (EX-240-1)
No.	Title	Length
1.	"Drop a Beat" (Brainstorm Mix)	4:21
2.	"Electricity"	3:27
3.	"Drop a Beat" (Deep Mix)	5:57

== Charts ==
Chart (1992)	Peak position
US Dance Club Songs (Billboard)	6
US Dance/Electronic Singles Sales (Billboard)	38
