= Hymn (Moby song) =

1994 single by Moby

Single by Moby

from the album Everything Is Wrong
- B-side: "All That I Need Is to Be Loved"
- Released: May 16, 1994
- Length: 3:17 (album version); 3:45 (single version)
- Label: Mute
- Songwriter: Moby
- Producer: Moby

Moby singles chronology
"All That I Need Is to Be Loved" (1993)	"Hymn" (1994)	"Feeling So Real" (1994)

Music video
- "Hymn" on YouTube

"Hymn" is a song written, produced, and performed by American electronica musician Moby. It was released in May 1994 by Mute Records as the first single from the musician's third studio album, Everything Is Wrong (1995). The single version, which was radically remixed from the album original and retitled "Hymn (This Is My Dream)", peaked at number 31 on the UK Singles Chart and number three in Finland. A 33-minute ambient remix was also released, titled as "Hymn.Alt.Quiet.Version". The accompanying music video for "Hymn" was directed by English director Walter Stern, featuring Moby performing with silver bodypaint.

== Critical reception ==
Upon the release, Larry Flick from Billboard magazine described it as "a brain-tugging effort that combines an insistent house beat with dreamy choral vocals and darkly compelling, faux-orchestral synths. For an intriguing twist, go for the "Upriver" mix, with its butt-shagging tribal percussion and ominous vocal loops." Steve Baltin from Cash Box complimented it as a "beautiful piano tune". Ian Gittins from Melody Maker called it a "sunrise symphony". Andy Beevers from Music Week gave it four out of five and named it Pick of the Week in the category of Dance, saying, "Moby can always be relied on to come up with a novel and commercial twist on the house formula. This time he goes for a full-blown choral treatment with the hard-edged synth sounds."

Stuart Bailie from NME stated that the track "is actually a blinder — mighty banks of angels all giving it their best hosannas and these unreal whizzing effects giving you the impression that you're zooming through the clouds, en route to a meeting with the great man himself." Another NME editor, Ben Willmott, wrote in the magazine's Vibes column, "More very commercial party techno from Moby — this is no doubt chartbound", while Johnny Cigarettes noted its "sweeping melancholy". Gareth Grundy from Select said, "'Hymn' itself is another example of his uncanny ability to mix credible techno sounds and cheesy, anthemic choruses. Any elitist wireheads not convinced should fast forward to the elegant acid remix by the revered Laurent Garnier."

== Track listings ==
- CD single (CDMUTE161)
1. "Hymn (This Is My Dream)" – 3:45
2. "All That I Need Is to Be Loved" (H.O.S. mix) – 2:45
3. "Hymn" (European edit) – 8:57
4. "Hymn" (Laurent's Wake Up) – 8:43
- CD single (LCDMUTE161)
1. "Hymn.Alt.Quiet.Version" – 33:43 (running time listed as "33.3333333333333" minutes on the packaging)
- 12-inch single (12MUTE161)
1. "Hymn (This Is My Dream)" (extended mix) – 4:42
2. "Hymn" (Laurent's Wake Up) – 8:43
3. "Hymn (Upriver)" – 5:47
4. "Hymn (Dirty Hypo)" – 7:20
- 12-inch single (L12MUTE161)
1. "Hymn (Menacing)" – 5:57
2. "Hymn" (European mix) – 7:02
3. "Hymn (Lucky Orgasm)" – 6:03
4. "Hymn (I Believe)" – 7:08

== Charts ==
Chart (1994)	Peak position
Europe (Eurochart Hot 100)	50
Finland (Suomen virallinen lista)	3
Netherlands (Single Top 100 Tipparade)	9
Switzerland (Schweizer Hitparade)	46
UK Singles (OCC)	31
UK Dance (Music Week)	9
UK Club Chart (Music Week)	7
US Dance Club Songs (Billboard)	10
UK Indie (Music Week)	1

== Release history ==
Region	Date	Format(s)	Label(s)	Ref.
United Kingdom	May 16, 1994	12-inch vinyl; CD; cassette	Mute	
Australia	May 30, 1994	12-inch vinyl; CD	Mute	
