= Myim Rose =

American singer-songwriter

Myim Rose was a singer-songwriter and actress from Washington Heights, Manhattan. She is best known for vocals on the 1994 Moby song "Feeling So Real" and playing Layla in the 1992 film Unlawful Entry. She was a singer-songwriter who fronted her own rock band in New York City. In November 2006, Myim died after a 4-year battle with cancer. Myim married actor Brian Gant in 2001. He was with her at the time of her death.

== Filmography ==
Year	Title	Role	Notes
1992	Run Like Hell	Victim	
1992	Unlawful Entry	Layla	(final film role)
