= Mimi Goese =

American professional musician

Mimi Goese (last name rhymes with hazy) is an American professional musician.

== Career ==
Goese was the vocalist for dream pop band Hugo Largo.

=== Solo ===
Under the mononym "Mimi", she released a solo album, Soak, on the Luaka Bop label, with contributions from French record producer Hector Zazou and some tracks produced by former Hugo Largo bandmate Hahn Rowe. She released a cover of Screamin' Jay Hawkins' "I Put a Spell on You" as a single.

=== Collaborations ===
Two collaborations with Moby, tracks "Into the Blue" and "When It's Cold I'd Like to Die", appear on Moby's 1995 album Everything Is Wrong. The latter was heard during the closing credits of The Sopranos episode "Join the Club" and the first, fourth, and fifth seasons of the Netflix series Stranger Things.

In 2006, Goese collaborated and performed onstage with the "mutantrumpeter" Ben Neill on a project called XIX. In 2010, the duo collaborated on a musical theater piece titled "Persephone", which was premiered at the Brooklyn Academy of Music's 2010 Next Wave Festival. Goese and Neill were commissioned by BAM to create the staged work (co-starring actress Julia Stiles) with multimedia company Ridge Theater. "Persephone" With a book by Tony Award-winning playwright Warren Leight, it grew out of the 19th-century musical themes that Goese and Neill were exploring. An album featuring music from the project, Songs for Persephone, was released by Ramseur Records in August 2011.

She also collaborated with Leonor Almanza and Amalio Martinez, with all three contributing vocals (sung in English and Spanish) to the song "Lonely Traveler/La Enorme Distancia" on the 2008 compilation album Songs Across Walls of Separation, released by Norwegian label Kirkelig Kulturverksted.

Her most recent project was a collaboration with Cornish band the Ascension Plan, guesting on two tracks, "Buoy" and "Life (You Are)", and a one-off performance at the Minack Theatre in Porthcurno on May 2, 2014.

=== Other endeavors ===
Goese appeared in the 1996 short film "Black Kites", directed by Jo Andres.

Although she continues to perform occasionally, she also teaches classes in performing arts.
