= Rock House =

Rock House, Rockhouse, Old Rock House or variations may refer to:

== Places ==
=== United States ===
(by state)

- Old Rock House (Harpersville, Alabama), listed on the National Register of Historic Places (NRHP) in Shelby County, Alabama
- Rock House, Arizona, a census-designated place in Gila County
- Rock House (Groom Creek, Arizona), listed on the NRHP in Yavapai County
- Old Rock House (Thomson, Georgia), listed on the NRHP in McDuffie County
- Old Rock House (Alton, Illinois), a station on the Underground Railroad
- Rockhouse, Kentucky, an unincorporated community and coal town in Pike County
- Creelsboro Natural Bridge, in Russell County, Kentucky, commonly referred to as Rock House or the Rockhouse
- Old Rock House (Moscow Mills, Missouri), listed on the NRHP in Lincoln County
- Adam Spach Rock House Site, listed on the NRHP in Davidson County, North Carolina
- Rock House (King, North Carolina), listed on the NRHP in Stokes County
- Rock House (Roaring Gap, North Carolina), listed on the NRHP in Alleghany County
- Rockhouse, Texas
- Rock House-Custodian's Residence, Moab, Utah, listed on the NRHP in Grand County

== United Kingdom ==
- Rock Houses, at Kinver Edge

== Other ==
- "Rock House", a 1985 song by Circle Jerks from Wonderful
- Roy Orbison at the Rock House, a 1961 rockabilly album
- Rock shelters, shallow natural caves
