= Move (Moby song) =

EP by Moby
- Released: August 31, 1993
- Recorded: 1993
- Genre: Techno
- Length: 21:26 (UK release); 31:52 (US release)
- Label: Mute; Elektra
- Producer: Moby

Moby chronology
Ambient (1993)	Move (1993)	Everything Is Wrong (1995)

Professional ratings
Review scores
Source	Rating
AllMusic	4/5 stars
Entertainment Weekly	B+
Philadelphia Inquirer	3.5/4 stars
Spin Alternative Record Guide	9/10
Tom Hull – on the Web	B+
The Village Voice	A−

"Move (You Make Me Feel So Good)" is a song by American electronic musician Moby, with a chorus sampling from Loleatta Holloway's 1980 song "Love Sensation". It was first released as the title track on Moby's extended play Move, which was issued on August 31, 1993, as his first release on Mute Records in the United Kingdom and on Elektra Records in the United States. It hit number one on the US Billboard Hot Dance Music/Club Play chart and number 21 on the UK Singles Chart.

"Move" was released as a two-track single from the EP in certain territories, featuring the EP version of the song and a "Disco Threat" mix of the same song. The song "All That I Need Is to Be Loved" from the Move EP was also issued as a single and later included in a different version on Moby's third studio album, Everything Is Wrong (1995). Remixes of "Move" were also featured on the Everything Is Wrong remix album (1996).

== Critical reception ==
Everett True from Melody Maker wrote, "Yes, yes, yes! Finest record of its kind since 'Ride on Time'." Andy Beevers from Music Week gave it five out of five and named it Pick of the Week in the category of Dance. He added, "This EP is Moby's first release on Mute and is shaping up to be a big hit. Already massive on the nation's dancefloors, the title track is a charging anthemic house track, identified by its 'You make me feel so good' female vocal. The various mixes, including MK's excellent Blades remix, are ensuring widespread appeal." Stuart Bailie from NME said, "Moby gives Jesus Christ a sleeve credit, but the spirit's flagging on 'Move'. Screaming velocity and Black Box shoutey vocals may signify some big holy show, but maybe they disguise a lack of new tricks." Sam Wood from Philadelphia Inquirer declared it "a fiercely energetic dance-floor anthem". Charles Aaron from Spin commented, "The only card-carrying human in the techno scene takes a generically transcendent house-diva vocal and plunges it into a sampled torment of biblical proportions, a war between flesh, spirit, and technology that exudes skepticism and ecstasy in equal spurts. I think I love this guy."

== Track listing ==
All tracks are written by Moby.

UK CD release (CDMUTE158)
No.	Title	Length
1.	"Move (You Make Me Feel So Good)"	3:39
2.	"All That I Need Is to Be Loved (MV)"	5:18
3.	"Unloved Symphony"	6:11
4.	"The Rain Falls and the Sky Shudders"	6:18
Total length:		21:26

US CD release (61568)
No.	Title	Length
1.	"Move (You Make Me Feel So Good)"	3:39
2.	"All That I Need Is to Be Loved (MV)"	5:18
3.	"Morning Dove"	5:43
4.	"Move (Disco Threat)"	4:43
5.	"Unloved Symphony"	6:11
6.	"The Rain Falls and the Sky Shudders"	6:18
Total length:		31:52

UK 12-inch release (12 MUTE158)
No.	Title	Length
1.	"Move (You Make Me Feel So Good)"	3:39
2.	"Morning Dove"	6:08
3.	"All That I Need Is to Be Loved"	7:00
4.	"Unloved Symphony"	6:11
Total length:		22:58

UK 12-inch release – remixes (L12 MUTE 158)
No.	Title	Length
1.	"Move (You Make Me Feel So Good)"	6:24
2.	"Move (You Make Me Feel So Good)" (MK Blades Mix)	6:10
3.	"Move (You Make Me Feel So Good)" (Sub Version)	6:11
4.	"Move (You Make Me Feel So Good)" (Xtra Mix)	6:39
Total length:		25:24

=== Single release ===
"Move"

Single by Moby

from the album Move
- Released: September 1993
- Recorded: 1993
- Length: 3:39
- Label: Mute
- Songwriter: Moby
- Producer: Moby

Moby singles chronology
"I Feel It" / "Thousand" (1993)	"Move" (1993)	"All That I Need Is to Be Loved" (1993)

Music video
- "Move" on YouTube

UK CD single (CD 7 MUTE 158)
No.	Title	Length
1.	"Move (You Make Me Feel So Good)"	3:39
2.	"Move (Disco Threat)"	4:43

== Personnel ==
Credits for Move adapted from album liner notes.

- Moby – engineering, production, writing
- Curt Frasca – mixing on "Move (You Make Me Feel So Good)"
- Rozz Morehead – vocals on "Move (You Make Me Feel So Good)"
- Carole Sylvan – vocals on "Move (You Make Me Feel So Good)"

Artwork and design

- Barbara Lambert – design
- Damien Loeb – video photography

== Charts ==
=== Weekly charts ===
Chart (1993)	Peak position
Europe (Eurochart Hot 100)	63
Europe (European Dance Radio)	10
Netherlands (Dutch Top 40)	32
Netherlands (Single Top 100)	23
Sweden (Sverigetopplistan)	40
UK Singles (Official Charts)	21
UK Airplay (ERA)	73
UK Dance (Music Week)	2
UK Club Chart (Music Week)	3
US Dance Club Songs (Billboard)	1

=== Year-end charts ===
Chart (1993)	Position
UK Club Chart (Music Week)	96
