= Into the Blue (Moby song) =

1995 single by Moby

Single by Moby

from the album Everything Is Wrong
- B-side: "Shining"
- Released: June 19, 1995
- Length: 5:45 (album version); 4:10 (single version)
- Label: Mute
- Songwriters: Moby; Mimi Goese
- Producer: Moby

Moby singles chronology
"Everytime You Touch Me" (1995)	"Into the Blue" (1995)	"Bring Back My Happiness" (1995)

Music video
- "Into the Blue" on YouTube

"Into the Blue" is a song by American electronica musician Moby, released on June 19, 1995 by Mute Records, as the fourth single from his third studio album, Everything Is Wrong (1995). American musician Mimi Goese co-wrote the lyrics with Moby and provided the vocals. The song is slow and melancholy, a stark contrast to the first four singles from the album.

The single peaked at number 34 on the UK Singles Chart. In one of the remixes, the "Spiritual Remix", Joy Division's song "Atmosphere" is prominently sampled and sequenced. Jon Spencer, frontman of American alternative rock band Jon Spencer Blues Explosion and a friend of Moby, contributed the blues-influenced "Into the Blues Mix" to the single, and in turn Moby remixed one of the band's own tracks.

== Critical reception ==
The Stud Brothers of Melody Maker complimented "Into the Blue" as "Mimi Goese's cosmic ballad, a melancholy collision of Joni Mitchell and Chimera and probably the straightest track on Everything Is Wrong". Another Melody Maker editor, Simon Price, felt that "this sounds like Enya". A reviewer from Music & Media commented, "First he's raving, then he's pop as pop could be. 'Into the Blue' belongs to the latter category. It would almost be MOR material if the beats weren't that prominent." Brad Beatnik from Music Week's RM Dance Update wrote, "What an oddity. The original album mix is a beautiful, haunting cut featuring the soaring vocals of Mimi Goese – as showcased on Later with Jools Holland recently."

Johnny Cigarettes from NME remarked "the rich, dark female voice warbling over 'Into the Blue''s aquatic ambience". Another NME editor, Ben Willmott, opined, "This time, he's shunned his normal gay-disco-meets-techno hybrid in favour of a dated and uncomfortably melancholic shuffling ballad about flying off into the sky." Gareth Grundy from Select wrote that "the MOR-ish 'Into the Blue' is the kind of thing you'd normally expect from Billie Ray Martin." Also Barry Walters for Spin complimented the "ethereal tones" of Goese, "with a ghostly grace that's truly startling after so much excitation."

== Track listing ==
- 12-inch single (12MUTE179)
1. "Into the Blue" (Buzz Boys Main Room Mayhem Mix) – 7:45
2. "Into the Blue" (Underground Mix) – 8:19
3. "Into the Blue" (Hard Mix) – 8:46
4. "Into the Blue" (Voodoo Child Mix) – 6:14
- CD single (CDMUTE179)
1. "Into the Blue" (Beatmasters Mix) – 4:10
2. "Shining" – 4:49
3. "Into the Blue" (Summer Night Mix) – 7:20
4. "Into the Blue" (Into the Blues Mix) – 5:38
- CD single – remixes (LCDMUTE179)
1. "Into the Blue" (Voodoo Child Mix) – 6:14
2. "Into the Blue" (Spiritual Mix) – 8:59
3. "Into the Blue" (Simple Mix) – 6:13
4. "Into the Blue" (Uplifting 4 Beat Mix) – 5:49
5. "Into the Blue" (Summer Wind Mix) – 4:52
6. "Into the Blue" (The Buzz Boys Main Room Mayhem Mix) – 7:45

== Charts ==
=== Weekly charts ===
Chart (1995)	Peak position
Europe (European Dance Radio)	25
Ireland (IRMA)	17
Israel (Israeli Singles Chart)	27
Scottish Singles Sales (Official Charts)	34
UK Singles (Official Charts)	34
UK Club Chart (Music Week)	14

=== Year-end charts ===
Chart (1995)	Position
UK Club Chart (Music Week)	85
