= Rock the House Parliamentary Competition =

Rock The House is a British Parliamentary live music and venue competition founded by Mike Weatherley MP. The competition celebrates up-and-coming unsigned British artists and the live music venues that support them.

The aim of Rock The House is to raise the political profile of the importance of intellectual property rights, and live music, among Parliamentarians. The competition seeks to highlight the importance of copyright in protecting musicians.

== Rules ==
Every British MP is invited to nominate a solo-artist, a band, an under-18s act and the best small live music venue from their constituency to participate in Rock The House. A panel of international music industry experts and musicians determine the finalists who compete in a live battle of the bands. The winners in each artist's category play a live set on the Terrace of the House of Commons in the evening at the finale reception.

A range of prizes are awarded to the winners. Prizes from the 2012 Rock The House included top-end Gibson guitars, tickets to the UK Music Video Awards, inclusion in a Caffe Nero in-store playlist and a signed bass guitar by Blink 182.

== History ==
The Rock The House Parliamentary Competition was founded by Weatherley in 2011. It is the biggest Parliamentary competition with a record- breaking 165 MPs taking part and 195 nominations received for Rock The House 2012.

Weatherley has had a longstanding interest in promoting the creative industries. Prior to entering politics, he was Financial Controller of the Pete Waterman Group from 2000 to 2005. In 2007, he became Vice President (Europe) for the Motion Picture Licensing Company. Mike is a fan of heavy metal and rock music.

== Patrons ==
The competition's patrons have included: Alice Cooper, Ian Gillan from Deep Purple, Rick Wakeman, Mark Hoppus from Blink 182, Charlie Simpson from Busted, Matt Tuck from Bullet For My Valentine and Axewound, Rob Damiani from Don Broco, Yngwie Malmsteen, Rob Caggiano from Anthrax, Steel Panther, Scott Gorham from Thin Lizzy and Bernie Marsden from Whitesnake.

== Film The House ==
Film The House is the sister competition to Rock the House, founded in 2012. The competition celebrates the best up-and-coming amateur film producers, directors and script-writers via a national competition.

The competition is broken into five categories: Drama/Thriller/Action, Comedy, Music Video, Documentary, and Under 18s. Local MPs nominate the top short film from each category from their consistency and submit their nominations to a judging panel of film industry heavyweights.

Film The House aims to raise the profile of the importance of copyright to film makers, of film itself and the creative industries in general among Parliamentarians and the Government.

== House The House ==
House The House is a Parliamentary DJ competition, founded by Mike Weatherley in 2012 in conjunction with the Last Night a DJ Saved My Life charity. The competition celebrates the best up-and-coming and unsigned DJ talent. The aim of the competition is to raise awareness of the importance of copyright in the music industry.

Entrants are invited to upload DJ mixes of any genre. Regional heats are held throughout the UK, with each heat judged by a selection of local leaders and music industry representatives.

The grand final is held on the House of Commons Terrace with the winner gaining a chance to perform alongside a famous DJ.
