= Ambient (album) =

Studio album by Moby
- Released: August 17, 1993
- Genre: Ambient techno
- Length: 51:49
- Label: Instinct
- Producer: Moby

Moby chronology
Early Underground (1993)	Ambient (1993)	Move (1993)

Professional ratings
Review scores
Source	Rating
AllMusic	3/5 stars
Christgau's Consumer Guide	(3-star Honorable Mention)
Music Week	4/5 stars
NME	6/10
Q	3/5 stars
The Rolling Stone Album Guide	3.5/5 stars
Select	4/5
Spin Alternative Record Guide	7/10
Tom Hull – on the Web	B+

Ambient is the second album by the American electronica musician Moby, released in August 1993 by the record label Instinct.

== Track listing ==
All tracks are written by Moby.

No.	Title	Length
1.	"My Beautiful Blue Sky"	5:19
2.	"Heaven"	8:16
3.	"Tongues"	5:37
4.	"J Breas"	2:47
5.	"Myopia"	4:46
6.	"House of Blue Leaves"	6:20
7.	"Bad Days"	2:27
8.	"Piano & String"	1:35
9.	"Sound"	1:11
10.	"Dog"	7:35
11.	"80"	2:05
12.	"Lean on Me"	3:51
Total length:		51:49

== Personnel ==
Credits for Ambient adapted from album liner notes.

- Moby – production, writing
- Bob Ward – digital editing

Artwork and design

- Jill Greenberg – photography
- Wendi Horowitz – design
