= Go (Moby song) =

1991 single by Moby

Single by Moby

from the album Moby
- Released: March 1991
- Genre: Rave
- Label: Instinct; Rough Trade; Outer Rhythm
- Songwriters: Moby; Angelo Badalamenti; David Lynch
- Producer: Moby

Moby singles chronology
"Mobility" (1990)	"Go" (1991)	"Drop a Beat" (1992)

Music video
- "Go" on YouTube

"Go" is a song by American electronica musician Moby, released in March 1991 by record label Instinct as the first single from his self-titled debut album (1992). It was co-written and produced by Moby, built around a sample from the American TV-series Twin Peaks. The single peaked within the top ten of the charts in the Netherlands and the United Kingdom, as well as peaking at number one on the Music Week Dance Singles chart and number 18 on the US Billboard Hot Dance Club Play chart. The accompanying music video was directed by Ondrej Rudavský. NME ranked "Go" number 41 in their list of "Singles of the Year" in December 1991.

== Background ==
"Go", in its original form, was first released as the B-side to Moby's debut single "Mobility" in November 1990. Moby later composed an alternate mix of the song, built around string samples from Angelo Badalamenti's "Laura Palmer's Theme" from the television series Twin Peaks, which was released as a single in its own right in March 1991.

The title of the single version, "Woodtick Mix", is a reference to "Episode 7" of Twin Peaks, when Special Agent Dale Cooper gets shot three times after folding up his bulletproof vest while chasing a wood tick as revealed in "Episode 8". Moby himself confirmed this was the case in his book.

"Go" samples the titular vocal from Tones on Tail's song "Go!". The "yeah" vocal which features prominently in the track is actually a sample from soul singer Jocelyn Brown, taken from her 1985 single "Love's Gonna Get You".

== Release ==
"Go" was released in March 1991 by Instinct Records. The song peaked within the top ten of the charts in the Netherlands and the United Kingdom. In 2001, Moby recalled, "When it was released, my dream was for it to sell 4,000 copies. It did a couple of million, including compilations. And I really thought that when DJs played 'Go', it was because they were taking pity on me for making such a mediocre song. I guess it's a good thing I'm not a record company executive, huh?"

Fourteen different remixes of "Go" were collected and combined into an entire continuous CD as a bonus disc for Moby's 1996 compilation album Rare: The Collected B-Sides 1989–1993. Another mix was produced for the compilation I Like to Score, released the following year. Trentemøller and Vitalic produced remixes for Moby's 2006 compilation Go – The Very Best of Moby; on the UK version of the album, the I Like to Score mix of the song appears instead. An orchestral, acoustic arrangement was released on Moby's Reprise album in 2021.

== Critical reception ==
Sherman at the Controls from NME wrote, "Well, the biggie that's going to be happening over the next couple of months is undoubtedly 'Go' by Moby. Already hot on import (US Instinct), the outstanding feature is its use of the eerie and atmospheric spine tingling chords from Twin Peaks, pumped up with a frantic phased beat and interspersed with yelps of 'Go'. Moby probably doesn't quite realise what a monster he has on his hands; due out here very soon on Outer Rhythm, be prepared to hear this everywhere, it's going to be enormous." An editor from Rolling Stone remarked that the single "heralded techno's first real DJ superstar. The New York-based producer and artist initially hit big in British clubs with 'Go', animating the stiff bleeps and blips of early techno by placing them atop the eerie Twin Peaks theme and dropping in a booty-shaking groove. The sound of drums sucked backward over interspersed shouts of 'go' made this underground track appeal to club audiences as well as to ravers, and paved the way for more experimental producers and DJs to enter the world of mainstream dance." Rupert Howe from Select noted that "tension is ever-present" on the track, "where an adrenal, bug-eyed backbeat threatens aural violence on the shimmering Twin Peaks theme". Tony Fletcher from Spin felt that Moby had produced "one of this year's most alluring club hits", utilizing strings from the TV-series "for haunting effect".

== Legacy ==
NME ranked "Go" number 41 in their list of "Singles of the Year" in December 1991. In September 1996, David Stubbs from Melody Maker wrote, "Moby was responsible for 'Go', not just one of the few techno/pop crossover hits to endure in the affections of non-dance aficionadoes but also one of the few attempts on the part of white, left-field America to get to grips with dance culture, or anything more technophile than a state-of-the-art wah-wah pedal." In 2010, it was ranked number 134 in Pitchfork's "Top 200 Tracks of the 1990s" list. In 2015, LA Weekly ranked the track number 20 in their list of "The 20 Best Dance Music Tracks in History", describing it as "a distinctly American take on British-style techno, filled with widescreen drama and heart-on-sleeve emotion". In 2022, Classic Pop ranked "Go" number 12 in their list of the top 40 dance tracks from the 90's. Same year, Rolling Stone ranked it number 69 in their list of "200 Greatest Dance Songs of All Time". In March 2025, Billboard magazine ranked it number 45 in their "The 100 Best Dance Songs of All Time", writing, "It was a stroke of genius on Moby's part, which he enhanced with key rave elements and his inherent feel for arrangement. By alternating between jittery, high-energy beats with an infectious piano riff and more somber, emotional strings, Moby masterfully plays with the dancefloor's mood."

== Music video ==
The music video for "Go" was directed by Slovak artist and filmmaker Ondrej Rudavský. In December 2020, Moby commented on the video, "And #f6f to 1991, and my very first music video, for 'Go'..I'm still amazed that for a budget of $1500 we got something so phenomenal from the director, Ondrej Rudavský. Also I'm amazed that at one point in my life I had hair." The music video was made available on EMI's official YouTube channel in 2009.

== Track listing ==
CD single – Original Rough Trade/Outer Rhythm release
No.	Title	Length
1.	"Go" (Woodtick Mix)	6:31
2.	"Go" (Low Spirit Mix)	6:09
3.	"Go" (Analog Mix)	6:22

12-inch single – Original Rough Trade/Outer Rhythm/Instinct release
No.	Title	Length
1.	"Go" (Woodtick Mix)	6:35
2.	"Go" (Low Spirit Mix)	6:08
3.	"Go" (Voodoo Child Mix)	4:50

CD and 12-inch singles – Low Spirit release
No.	Title	Length
1.	"Go" (Original Mix)	6:13
2.	"Go" (Remix)	6:09
3.	"Breathe"	6:15

Track 2 is usually referred to as the "Low Spirit" remix.

12-inch single (mixes) – Outer Rhythm/Instinct release
No.	Title	Length
1.	"Go" (Analog Mix)	6:24
2.	"Go" (Nighttime Mix)	6:11
3.	"Go" (Soundtrack Mix)	6:10

CD single (remixes) – Instinct release
No.	Title	Length
1.	"Go" (Radio Edit)	3:32
2.	"Go" (Rainforest Mix)	5:18
3.	"Go" (Subliminal Mix)	4:30
4.	"Go" (Woodtick Mix)	6:31
5.	"Go" (Soundtrack Mix)	5:21
6.	"Go" (Original Mix)	6:15

12-inch single (remixes) – Instinct release
No.	Title	Length
1.	"Go" (Woodtick Mix)	6:30
2.	"Go" (Low Spirit Mix)	6:08
3.	"Go" (Analog Mix)	6:10
4.	"Go" (Soundtrack Mix)	6:10

12-inch single (remixes) – Outer Rhythm release
No.	Title	Length
1.	"Go" (Rainforest Mix)	5:18
2.	"Go" (Video Mix)	3:38
3.	"Go" (Analog Mix)	6:10

Double 12-inch single The Ultimate Go – Outer Rhythm release
No.	Title	Length
1.	"Go" (Delirium Mix)	6:08
2.	"Go" (In Dub Mix)	7:21
3.	"Go" (The Mover Mix)	6:07
4.	"Go" (Arpathoski Mix)	6:05
5.	"Go" (Amphetamix Mix)	5:34
6.	"Go" (Barracuda Mix)	4:56

== Charts ==
Chart (1991–1992)	Peak position
Belgium (Ultratop 50 Flanders)	20
Finland (Suomen virallinen lista)	17
Netherlands (Dutch Top 40)	6
Netherlands (Single Top 100)	9
UK Singles (Official Charts)	10
UK Airplay (Music Week)	46
UK Dance (Music Week)	1
UK Indie (Music Week)	1
UK Club Chart (Record Mirror)	18
US Dance Club Songs (Billboard)	18
US Dance Singles Sales (Billboard)	16

== Certifications ==
Region	Certification	Certified units/sales
United Kingdom (BPI)	Silver	200,000^{‡}
^{‡} Sales+streaming figures based on certification alone.
