= Harvey (surname) =

Harvey is a surname, and may refer to:

== A ==
- Aaron Harvey (born 1980), American film director and writer
- Abner McGehee Harvey (1911–1998), American physician, educator and historian
- Adam Harvey (born 1974), Australian country music singer
- Adam Harvey (artist) (born 1981), American artist and researcher in Berlin
- Adam Paul Harvey (born 1984), English actor
- Ahmari Harvey (born 2003), American football player
- Aiden J. Harvey (born 1952), English comedian and impersonator
- Alan Harvey (born 1942), Canadian soccer player
- Albert Harvey (1843–1912), Scottish merchant and rugby union footballer
- Albert W. Harvey (1879–1956), American businessman and government official from Vermont
- Alex Harvey (actor), American actor
- Alex Harvey (country musician) (1941–2020), American singer-songwriter
- Alex Harvey (curler), Scottish wheelchair curler
- Alex Harvey (director), American filmmaker, theater director, writer and producer
- Alex Harvey (musician) (1935–1982), Scottish blues/rock musician
- Alex Harvey (skier) (born 1988), Canadian cross-country skier
- Alexander Harvey II (1923–2017), American judge
- Alexander Gordon Cummins Harvey, British cotton manufacturer and merchant
- Alexander Miller Harvey (1867–1928), American lawyer, politician and author
- Alf Harvey (1856–1943), English footballer
- Alfred Harvey (1913–1994), American comic-book publisher
- Alisa Harvey (born 1965), American middle-distance runner
- Allison G. Harvey, Australian clinical psychologist and researcher
- Amy Harvey (born 2002), Japanese singer and rapper
- Ana Recio Harvey, Mexican translator and business development adviser
- André Harvey (MNA) (born 1939), Canadian member of the National Assembly of Quebec
- André Harvey (MP) (born 1941), Canadian consultant, politician and teacher
- André Harvey (sculptor) (1941–2018), American sculptor
- Andrew Harvey (journalist) (born 1944), British journalist and television presenter
- Andrew Harvey (politician), Canadian politician
- Andrew Harvey (religious writer) (born 1952), author, religious scholar and teacher of mystic traditions
- Andy Harvey (fl. 1937–1938), American baseball player
- Ann Harvey (1811–1860), fisher and rescuer in Newfoundland
- Anna Harvey (1944–2018), British fashion journalist
- Anna Harvey (social scientist), American social scientist in the field of criminal justice
- Anthony Harvey (1930–2017), British film director and editor
- Anthony Harvey (footballer) (born 1973), Australian rules footballer
- Antje Harvey (born 1967), German cross-country skier and biathlete
- Antonio Harvey (born 1970), American basketball player
- Arnold Harvey (1878–1966), Irish sportsman and clergyman
- A. D. Harvey (born 1947), British historian
- Archie Harvey (born 1992), Liberian footballer
- Arthur Harvey (1895–1976), American businessman
- Arthur Harvey (Australian politician) (c.1827–1902), politician in colonial South Australia
- Arthur E. Harvey (1884–1971), American architect
- Arthur George Harvey (1866–1927), New Zealand doctor
- Arthur Harvey (Australian politician) (1827–1902), politician in the colony of South Australia
- Arthur Vere Harvey, Baron Harvey of Prestbury (1906–1994), British Royal Air Force officer and politician
- Aryana Harvey (born 1997), American soccer player
- Ashley Harvey-Walker (1944–1997), English cricketer
- Augustus William Harvey (1839–1903), Newfoundland industrialist and politician

== B ==
- Bagenal Harvey (died 1798), United Irishmen commander
- Balozi Harvey (1940–2016), American diplomat and activist
- Barbara Harvey (1928–2025), British medieval historian
- Barry Harvey (born 1964), New Zealand rugby league footballer
- Barton Harvey (1922–2008), Australian competitive sailor
- Ben Harvey (rugby union) (born 1974), English rugby union footballer and coach
- Ben Harvey (American radio personality), Sirius XM presenter and podcaster
- Ben Harvey (Australian radio personality) (born 1993), Australian radio presenter and comedian
- Bernadette Harvey, Australian concert pianist
- Bessie Harvey (1929–1994), American artist
- Bill Harvey (bandleader) (1918–1964), American bandleader
- Bill Harvey (footballer, born 1896) (1896–1972), English footballer and manager, and cricketer
- Bill Harvey (footballer, born 1908) (1908–1978), English footballer
- Bill Harvey (footballer, born 1920) (1920–2002), English footballer and manager
- Bill Harvey (baseball) (1908–1989), American baseball player
- Bill Harvey (Australian footballer) (1926–1957), Australian rules footballer
- Billie Harvey (1950–2007), American racing driver
- Billy Harvey (footballer) (1892–1917), Australian rules footballer
- Billy Harvey (politician) (1932–2006), American politician
- Bob Harvey (mayor) (born 1940), mayor of Waitakere City, New Zealand
- Bob Harvey (musician) (1934–2025), American member of the band Jefferson Airplane
- Bob Harvey (baseball) (1918–1992), American baseball player
- Bobby Harvey (born 1955), Scottish footballer
- Boo Harvey (born 1966), American basketball player
- Brent Harvey (born 1978), Australian rules footballer
- Brett Harvey (Canadian director), Canadian director, writer and cinematographer
- Brett Harvey (English director), English film writer and director
- Brett Harvey (rugby union) (born 1959), New Zealand rugby union footballer
- Brian Harvey (born 1974), English singer
- Brian Harvey (American runner) (born 1987), American distance runner
- Brian Harvey (Australian athlete) (born 1965), Australian Paralympic athlete in discus and javelin
- Brian Harvey (Australian rules footballer) (born 1949), Australian rules footballer
- Brian Harvey (author) (born 1953), Irish space-history author
- Brian Harvey (footballer, born 1947), English footballer
- Brian Harvey (lecturer) (born 1949), computer programmer and lecturer at Berkeley
- Brian Harvey (priest) (1916–2005), Irish Anglican priest
- Bryan Harvey (born 1963), American baseball player
- Bryan Harvey (footballer) (1938—2006), British football goalkeeper
- Bryan Harvey (musician) (1956–2006), American musician
- Buster Harvey (1950–2007), Canadian ice hockey player

== C ==
- Campbell Harvey (born 1958), Canadian economist
- Candi Harvey (born 1954/5), American basketball coach
- Carl Harvey (born 1958), Canadian guitarist and record producer
- Carla Harvey (born 1976/7), American musician
- Carlos Harvey (born 2000), Panamanian footballer
- Carmel Bernon Harvey Jr. (1946–1967), United States Army soldier, recipient of the Medal of Honor
- Caroline Harvey (born 2002), American ice hockey player
- Catherine Harvey (later Caughey, 1923–2008), British Colossus computer operator at Bletchley Park during World War II
- Cathryn Harvey, American politician from New Hampshire
- Cecil Harvey (Northern Ireland politician) (died 1985), Northern Irish politician and church elder
- Cecilia Harvey, American technology executive, author and entrepreneur
- Celia Harvey (born c.1962), British soldier and academic
- Chandler C. Harvey (1866–1940), American newspaper editor and publisher
- Charles Malcolm Barclay-Harvey (1890–1969), British politician and Governor of South Australia in 1944
- Charles Harvey (footballer) (1879–?), English footballer
- Charles Harvey (cricketer) (1837–1917), English cricketer and clergyman
- Charles Harvey (Indian Army officer) (1888–1969), officer in the British Indian Army
- Charles Harvey (scientist) (born c. 1964), American hydrologist at MIT
- Chris Harvey (ice hockey) (born 1967), American ice hockey goaltender
- Christine Harvey, New Zealand Māori tattoo artist and teacher
- Christopher Harvey (footballer) (born 1982), Jamaican footballer
- Christopher Harvey (poet) (1597–1663), English clergyman and poet
- Christy Harvey, American non-profit executive
- Cig Harvey (born 1973), British fine art photographer
- Claire Harvey (born 1974), British Paralympic competitor
- Clare Harvey, New Zealand academic
- Clarie Collins Harvey (1916–1995), American businesswoman, religious leader and civil rights activist
- Claude Harvey (born 1948), American football player
- Clem Harvey (1919–1988), American film actor
- Cliff Harvey (born 1904), Australian tennis player
- Clyde Harvey (born 1948), Trinidad and Tobago Catholic bishop
- Colin Harvey (born 1944), British football player and manager
- Colin Harvey (writer) (1960–2011), British science fiction writer, editor and reviewer
- Constance Slaughter-Harvey (born 1946), American jurist and judge
- Cordelia Harvey (1824–1895), American nurse and voluntary worker
- Cornell Harvey, American politician from Georgia
- Cynthia Harvey (born 1957), American ballet dancer, ballet mistress and educator
- Cynthia Fierro Harvey (born 1959), United Methodist Church bishop
- Cyril John Harvey (born 1930), Welsh Anglican priest
- Cyrus Harvey Jr. (1925–2011), American film distributor and entrepreneur

== D ==
- Dan Harvey (historian) (born 1959), Irish Defence Forces officer and military historian
- Daniel Harvey (diplomat) (1631–1672), English merchant and diplomat
- Daniel Harvey (British Army officer) (c.1664–1732), British army officer and politician
- Daniel Cobb Harvey (1886–1966), Canadian historian and archivist
- Daniel Whittle Harvey (1786–1863), British politician and founder of the Sunday Times
- Daniel Harvey (soccer) (born 1982), American soccer player
- Daniel S. Harvey, herpetologist, see wikispecies:Daniel S. Harvey
- David Harvey (born 1935), British-American Marxist geographer
- David Harvey (footballer) (born 1948), British football goalkeeper
- David Harvey (luthier), American mandolin player and luthier
- David Harvey (Ohio politician) (1792–1871), American politician
- David Harvey (paediatrician) (1936–2010), British paediatrician
- David Harvey (rugby union) (born 1982), Brazilian rugby union footballer
- David Harvey (structural engineer) (born 1947), British structural engineer in Canada
- David Harvey (television), Irish media executive and broadcaster
- David Alan Harvey (born 1944), American photographer
- David Archibald Harvey (1845–1916), American politician from Oklahoma
- David Charles Harvey (1946–2004), British historian and author
- D. W. Harvey (1887–1938), Canadian engineer and transportation manager
- Declan Harvey (born 1983), Irish journalist and presenter with BBC News
- Dee Harvey (1965–2012), American R&B singer
- Demondre Harvey (born 1993), American basketball player
- Denis Harvey (1929–2003), Canadian journalist and television executive
- Derek Harvey, American Army officer
- Derek J. Harvey, American politician
- Derrick Harvey (born 1986), American football player
- DJ Harvey (born 1961), English disk jockey
- DJ Harvey (American football) (born 2003), American football player
- Dom Harvey (born 1973), New Zealand radio host and podcaster
- Domino Harvey (1969–2005), British model turned Los Angeles bounty hunter
- Don Harvey (actor, born 1911) (1911–1963), American TV and film performer
- Don Harvey (actor, born 1960), American film and TV performer, and voice actor
- Don Harvey (basketball) (1920–2008), American basketball player
- Don Harvey (bishop) (born 1939), Canadian Anglican moderator and director
- Donald Harvey (1952–2017), American hospital orderly and serial killer
- Donnell Harvey (born 1980), American basketball player
- Doug Harvey (artist), writer, curator and artist based in Los Angeles
- Doug Harvey (ice hockey) (1924–1989), Canadian ice hockey player
- Doug Harvey (umpire) (1930–2018), American baseball umpire
- Drew Harvey (born 1955), Scottish footballer
- Drew Harvey (sport shooter) (born 1978), British sport shooter
- Duncan Harvey (bobsleigh) (born 1981), Australian bobsledder
- Duncan Harvey (rugby union) (1882–1957), Irish rugby union footballer

== E ==
- Earl Harvey (born 1967), American football player
- Eddie Harvey (1925–2012), British jazz musician
- Edmund Harvey (c.1601–1673), English soldier and Member of Parliament
- Edmund Harvey (cricketer) (1852–1902), English cricketer
- Edmund Harvey (footballer) (1900 – after 1930), English footballer
- Edmund Harvey (social reformer) (Thomas Edmund Harvey, 1875–1955), British Member of Parliament
- Edmund Arthur Harvey (1907–1994), Australian artist
- E. Newton Harvey (1887–1959), American zoologist
- Edward Harvey (1783–1865), British admiral
- Edward Harvey (British Army officer) (1718–1778), British Army general
- Edward Harvey-Johnston (1912–1971), English cricketer
- Edwin Harvey (1865–1926), American Methodist minister
- Elaine Harvey (born 1954), American politician
- Eleanor Harvey (born 1995), Canadian foil fencer
- Eleanor Jones Harvey, American museum curator
- Eli Harvey (1860–1957), American sculptor, painter and animalier
- Eliab Harvey (1758–1830), Royal Navy officer and politician
- Eliza Harvey (journalist) (born 1984), Australian journalist, television producer and presenter
- Eliza Maria Harvey (1838–1903), Canadian farmer, butter producer and writer
- Elizabeth Harvey (historian), British historian of 20th-century Germany
- Elizabeth Harvey (19th-century painter) (1778–1858), English artist
- Elizabeth Harvey (politician) (1946–2025), Australian politician
- Ellen Harvey (born 1967), American-British conceptual artist
- Erik LaRay Harvey, American actor
- Ermyntrude Harvey (1895–1973), British tennis player
- Ernest Harvey (cricketer) (1880–1923), Australian cricketer
- Ernest Harvey (footballer), English footballer
- Ernest Musgrave Harvey (1867–1955), chief cashier of the Bank of England, baronet
- Esin Harvey, (born 1979), Turkish actress
- Ethel Browne Harvey (1885–1965), American embryologist
- Eugene Harvey, American Magic: The Gathering player

== F ==
- Ferdie Harvey (born 1936), Jamaican cricketer
- Fiona Harvey, British environmental journalist
- Florence Harvey (1878–1968), Canadian golfer and WWI ambulance driver
- Forrester Harvey (1884–1945), Irish film actor
- Francis Harvey (1873–1916), British Marine awarded the Victoria Cross posthumously
- Francis Harvey (poet) (1925–2014), Northern Irish poet and playwright
- Francis J. Harvey (born 1943), American military administrator
- Francis Harvey (died 1632), English Member of Parliament
- Francis Harvey (MP for Colchester) (1534–1602), English politician
- Francis Harvey (MP for Northampton) (1611–1703), English lawyer and politician
- Frank Harvey (American football) (born 1971), American football player
- Frank Harvey (cricketer) (1864–1939), English sportsman
- Frank Harvey (playwright) (1842–1903), pseudonym of John Ainsworth Hilton, British actor and playwright, father of the Australian screenwriter
- Frank Harvey (priest) (1930–1986), Anglican Archdeacon of London
- Frank Harvey (Australian screenwriter) (1885–1965), English-born actor, producer and writer
- Frank Harvey (English screenwriter) (1912–1981), English screenwriter and playwright, son of the above screenwriter
- F. Reese Harvey (Frank Reese Harvey) (born 1941), American mathematician
- Franklyn Harvey (1943–2016), Grenadian academic and activist
- Fred Harvey (entrepreneur) (1835–1901), American developer of Harvey House restaurants
- Fred Harvey (politician) (born 1942), Canadian politician
- Frederick E. B. Harvey, 19th-century British official in China
- Frederick Maurice Watson Harvey (1888–1980), Canadian military officer and rugby union footballer
- F. W. Harvey (1888–1957), English solicitor, poet and broadcaster

== G ==
- Gabriel Harvey (1545–1631), English scholar and writer
- Gail Harvey, Canadian film and television director
- Gary Harvey (director) (born 1962), Canadian television director and producer
- Gary Harvey (footballer) (born 1961), English footballer
- Geoff Harvey (1935–2019), Australian musician and television personality
- George Harvey (American football) (born 1945), American football player
- George Harvey (British politician) (1870–1939), British Member of Parliament
- George Harvey (cricketer) (1885–1962), Australian cricketer
- George Harvey (FRS) (died 1834), English mathematician
- George Harvey (painter) (1806–1876), Scottish painter
- George Harvey (RAF officer) (1905–1969), British air marshal
- George Harvey (sport shooter) (1878–1958), South African sport shooter
- George Brinton McClellan Harvey (1864–1928), American journalist, businessman and diplomat
- George Isaac Harvey (1892–1973), Canadian politician from Ontario
- George Roy Harvey (1869–1935), American football coach
- George U. Harvey (1881–1946), Irish-American politician in New York
- Georgette Harvey (1884–1952), American singer and actress
- Gerry Harvey (born 1939), Australian businessman and entrepreneur
- Gertrude Harvey (1879–1966), British artist
- Ghislain Harvey (born 1946), Canadian politician
- Gideon Harvey (c. 1638–c. 1701), Dutch-English physician
- Glenmore Trenear-Harvey (born 1940), British intelligence analyst
- Godfrey Harvey (1891—1957), English British Army officer and cricketer
- G. E. Harvey (Godfrey Eric Harvey) (1889–1962), British diplomat, historian and academic
- Goldie Harvey (1981–2013), Nigerian singer
- Gordon Harvey (1858–1922), British merchant, industrialist and politician
- Grace Harvey (born 1998), British paralympic swimmer
- Graham Harvey (actor) (born c.1960), Australian actor
- Graham Harvey (footballer) (born 1961), Scottish footballer
- Graham Harvey (religious studies scholar) (born 1959), English scholar
- Graham Harvey (sport shooter) (born 1944), British sports shooter
- Graham Harvey (football manager) (born 1984), English football manager
- Grant Harvey (born 1984), American actor
- Guy Harvey (born 1955), Jamaican marine wildlife artist and conservationist

== H ==
- Hal Harvey (born 1961), American energy policy adviser
- Harold Harvey (artist) (1874–1941), Newlyn School painter
- Harry Harvey Sr. (1901–1985), American character actor
- Harry Harvey (Medal of Honor, 1865) (1846–1896), American soldier during Civil War
- Harry Harvey (Medal of Honor, 1901) (1873–1929), American Marine during Philippine–American War
- Harry Harvey (politician), Northern Ireland Assembly member
- Harvey Jones (footballer) (born 1936), British footballer
- Hayward A. Harvey (1824–1893), American engineer, industrialist and inventor of Harvey armor
- Heather Harvey (1899–1989), British writer and politician
- Henry Harvey (1743–1810), British admiral
- Henry Harvey (lawyer) (died 1585), English lawyer and college head
- Henry Stephen Harvey (1889–?), American architect
- Herk Harvey (1924–1996), American film director, actor and film producer
- Hermione Harvey (1931–2016), English actress and dancer
- H. W. Harvey (1887–1970), English marine biologist
- Horace Harvey (1863–1949), Canadian lawyer, jurist and judge
- Horace Harvey (bowls), South African lawn bowler
- Howard Harvey (1877–1904), English footballer
- Hugh Harvey (born 1949), Canadian ice hockey player
- Hunter Harvey (born 1994), American baseball player

== I ==
- Iain Harvey (born 1951), British film producer
- Ian Harvey (born 1972), Australian cricketer
- Ian Harvey (politician) (1914–1987), British businessman and politician
- Ian Harvey (rugby union) (1903–1966), New Zealand rugby union footballer
- Inman Harvey, British computer scientist
- Isabelle Harvey (born 1975), Canadian soccer player

== J ==
- Jack Harvey (basketball) (1918–1981), American basketball player
- Jack Harvey (director) (1881–1954), American actor, director and screenwriter
- Jack Harvey (greyhound trainer) (1907–1996), English greyhound trainer
- Jack Harvey (politician) (1907–1986), American politician
- Jack Harvey (racing driver) (born 1993), British racing driver
- Jack Harvey (VC) (1891–1940), English recipient of the Victoria Cross
- Jacqueline Harvey (born 1969), Australian author
- Jackson Harvey (born 2002), Australian freestyle skier
- J. T. Harvey, General Manager of Operations of the Toronto Transportation Commission
- Jahmal Harvey (born 2002), American boxer
- Jak Ali Harvey (born 1989), Jamaican sprinter
- James Harvey (artist) (1929–1965), American commercial and fine artist
- James Harvey (Australian politician) (died 1912), New South Wales politician
- James Harvey (basketball) (born 1979), Australian basketball player
- James Harvey (film critic) (1929–2020), American film critic and writer
- James Harvey (footballer) (1911 – after 1938), English football goalkeeper
- James Harvey (merchant) (died 1583), Lord Mayor of London in 1581
- James Harvey (offensive lineman) (born 1965), American football player
- James Harvey (quarterback) (born 1967), American football player
- James B. Harvey, served as the International Commissioner of Scouts Canada
- James G. Harvey (1869–1950), Canadian politician in Manitoba
- James H. Harvey (born 1923), member of the Tuskegee Airmen
- James M. Harvey (politician) (1833–1894), American politician from Kansas
- James Michael Harvey (born 1949), American Catholic cardinal
- Jamie Harvey (1955–2025), Scottish darts player
- Jan Harvey, British actress
- Jane Harvey (1925–2013), American jazz singer
- Jane Harvey (writer) (1771–1848), British poet and novelist
- Janet Harvey (born 1967), Canadian curler
- Jasper Harvey (born 1983), American football player
- Jean Harvey, American nutritionist
- Jeffrey Harvey (biologist) (born 1957), Canadian ecologist and journalist
- Jeffrey A. Harvey (born 1955), American theoretical physicist
- Jeron Harvey (born 1984), American football player
- Jerry Harvey (screenwriter) (1949–1988), American screenwriter and film programmer
- Jerry Harvey (inventor) (born 1961), American audio engineer
- Jim Harvey (born 1958), Northern Irish footballer and manager
- Jim Harvey (American football) (1943–2017), American football player
- Jim Harvey (firearms), American designer of firearms
- Joe Harvey (baseball) (born 1992), American baseball pitcher
- Joe Harvey (footballer) (1918–1989), English football player and manager
- Joe Harvey (politician) (c. 1938–2009), Canadian politician
- John Harvey (actor) (1911–1982), English stage and film actor
- John Harvey (Albemarle) (died 1679), Governor of Colonial North Carolina
- John Harvey (American actor) (1917–1970), American actor
- John Harvey (American football) (born 1966), American football player
- John Harvey or Harvey (announcer) (born 1951), American television and radio personality
- John Harvey (astrologer) (1564–1592), English astrologer and physician
- John Harvey (architectural historian) (1911–1997), British architectural historian
- John Harvey (Australian politician) (1823–1893), politician in the early days of South Australia
- John Harvey (author) (born 1938), British author of crime fiction
- John Harvey (British Army officer) (1778–1852), officer during the War of 1812 and Governor in Canada
- John Harvey (British politician) (1920–2008), British Member of Parliament
- John Harvey (Canadian football) (1950–2024), Canadian football player
- John Harvey (cricketer) (1939–2003), English cricketer
- John Harvey (cyclist) (1884–?), English cyclist
- John Harvey (filmmaker), Australian producer, director, playwright and screenwriter
- John Harvey (football manager), manager of Heart of Midlothian F.C. 1966–1970
- John Harvey (footballer, fl. 1890–1900), Scottish footballer (Sunderland AFC)
- John Harvey (footballer, born 1933), Scottish footballer (Partick Thistle)
- John Harvey (ironfounder), partner in Harveys of Hayle, late-18th-century ironfounders
- John Harvey (North Carolina politician) (died 1775), 18th-century Speaker of the North Carolina House of Representatives
- John Harvey (psychologist) (born 1943), American psychologist
- John Harvey (RAAF officer) (born 1954), Royal Australian Air Force Air Marshal
- John Harvey (racing driver) (1938–2020), winner of the 1983 Bathurst 1000
- John Harvey (Royal Navy officer, born 1740) (1740–1794), captain of HMS Brunswick
- John Harvey (Royal Navy officer, born 1772) (1772–1837), longserving Royal Navy officer
- John Harvey (rugby league) (born 1955), Australian rugby league footballer and coach
- John Harvey (Virginia governor) (died 1646), 17th-century Crown governor of Virginia
- John Anthony Harvey (born 1935), British entrepreneur and logistician
- John Musgrave Harvey (1865–1940), Australian judge
- John C. Harvey Jr. (born 1951), United States Navy admiral
- John D. Harvey (born 1968), American horror novelist
- John F. Harvey (John Francis Harvey, 1918–2010), American Catholic priest and moral theologian
- John T. Harvey (born 1961), English-American economist
- John Harvey-Jones (1924–2008), English businessman
- John Martin-Harvey (1863–1944), English actor-manager
- Jonathan Harvey (composer) (1939–2012), British composer
- Jonathan Harvey (politician) (1780–1859), American politician from New Hampshire
- Jonathan Harvey (cricketer) (born 1944), English cricketer
- Jonathan Harvey (playwright) (born 1968), English playwright, screenwriter and author
- Jonathon Harvey (born 1969), English cricketer
- Johnny Harvey, Scottish-American soccer player
- Jordan Harvey (born 1984), American soccer player
- Josh Harvey-Clemons (born 1994), American football player
- Joy Harvey (born 1934), American historian of science
- J. Richard Harvey, American accountant
- Julie Harvey (artist) (born 1963), American contemporary art painter, multimedia producer, video director and choreographer
- Julie Harvey (footballer), New Zealand footballer
- Juliet Harvey-Bolia, American politician from New Hampshire
- Justin John Harvey (born 1991), South African model, actor and television personality in South Korea

== K ==
- Kade Harvey (born 1975), Australian cricketer
- Karimu Hill-Harvey, American attorney and judge
- Kate Harvey (1862–1946), English suffragist, physiotherapist and charity worker
- Kate Benedict Harvey (1871–1936), American heiress, philanthropist and plantation owner
- Kathryn Harvey (soccer) (born 1997), Canadian soccer player
- Keith Harvey (1934–2018), English footballer
- Ken Harvey (American football) (born 1965), American football baseball
- Ken Harvey (baseball) (born 1978), American baseball player
- Ken Harvey (professor), Australian public health doctor
- Kenneth J. Harvey (born 1962), Canadian writer
- Kerry B. Harvey (born 1957), American attorney
- Kevin Harvey (ice hockey) (born 1984), Canadian ice hockey player
- Kevin Harvey (venture capitalist), American venture capitalist
- Kim Senklip Harvey, Canadian actress, playwright and director
- Kimmit Lowell Harvey (born 1973), Turks and Caicos Islands weightlifter
- Kit Hesketh-Harvey, (1957–2023), British musical performer and composer
- Kris Harvey (born 1984), American baseball pitcher
- Kyle Harvey (born 1993), American rapper known professionally as Kyle

== L ==
- Laning Harvey (1882–1942), American politician from Pennsylvania
- Larry Harvey (1948–2018), American artist, philanthropist and activist.
- Laura Harvey (born 1980), English footballer and manager
- Laurence Harvey (1928–1973), Lithuanian-British actor and film director
- Laurence R. Harvey (born 1970), English actor
- Lawrence Harvey (footballer) (born 1973), English-born footballer for the Turks and Caicos Islands team
- Lawrence Harvey (rugby union) (1876–1953), Scottish rugby union footballer
- Lawson Harvey (1856–1920), American judge
- Leah Harvey (born 1993/4), British actor
- Lee Harvey (academic) (born 1949), British academic and policy analyst
- Lee Harvey (footballer) (born 1966), English footballer
- Lefty Harvey (born 1890), American baseball player
- Leisha Harvey (born 1947), Australian politician
- Len Harvey (1907–1976), British boxer
- Leon Harvey (1893–1983), American football, basketball and ice hockey coach and educator
- Leon F. Harvey (1837–1912), American entomologist, physician and dentist
- Leonard Patrick Harvey (1929–2018), British historian
- Les Harvey (footballer) (1909–1990), Australian rules footballer
- Lesleigh Harvey (born 1960), Australian swimmer
- Leslie Harvey (1944–1972), Scottish rock musician, brother of Alex Harvey
- Leslie Harvey (RAF officer) (1896–1972), British Royal Air Force officer
- Lester Harvey (1919–1993), New Zealand rugby union footballer
- Lewis Jarvis Harvey (1871–1949), Australian artist and teacher
- Liam Harvey (born 2005), Scottish footballer
- Lilian Harvey (1906–1968), Anglo-German actress and singer
- Lilla Harvey-Smith, married name Lilla Brockway (1889–1974), British suffragist, socialist and pacifist
- Lillian Holland Harvey (1912–1994), American nurse, educator and doctor
- Lisa Harvey (born 1970), Canadian athlete
- Lisa Harvey-Smith, British-Australian astrophysicist, author and academic
- Liza Harvey, (born 1966), Australian politician
- Lola Harvey, British screenwriter and film actress of the 1930s
- Lorenzo D. Harvey (1848–1922), American educator and politician
- Lori Harvey (born 1997) is an American model, influencer and entrepreneur
- Louis P. Harvey (1820–1862), American politician and Governor of Wisconsin
- Luc Harvey (born 1964), Canadian politician
- Lynne Cooper Harvey (1916–2008), American radio producer
- L. B. Harvey, American college football coach

== M ==
- Mackenzie Harvey (born 2000), Australian cricketer
- Magali Harvey (born 1990), Canadian rugby player, daughter of Luc Harvey
- Maie B. Havey (1889–1971), American screenwriter
- Malcolm Harvey (1972–2016), American police officer
- Malcolm Barclay-Harvey (1890–1969), British politician and Governor of South Australia
- Mandy Harvey (born 1988), American jazz and pop singer/songwriter who is deaf
- Marcus Harvey (born 1963), English artist and painter
- Margaret Harvey (1768–1858), English poet and scholar
- Mario Harvey (born 1987), American football player
- Mark Harvey (born 1965), Australian rules football player and coach
- Mark Harvey (arachnologist) (born 1958), Australian arachnologist
- Mark Harvey (cricketer) (born 1974), English cricketer
- Margaret Harvey (actress), Australian writer, director and performer
- Martha J. Harvey, Canadian historian
- Martin Harvey (1941–2019), Northern Irish footballer
- Marvin Harvey (American football) (born 1959), American football player
- Marvin Harvey (basketball) (born 1954), American basketball player and coach
- Mary Harvey (born 1965), American soccer goalkeeper
- Mary-Sophie Harvey (born 1999), Canadian swimmer
- Matt Harvey (born 1989), American baseball player
- Matt Harvey (poet), British humorist and performance poet
- Matt T. Harvey, American journalist
- Matthea Harvey (born 1973), American poet, writer and academic
- Matthew Harvey (1781–1866), American politician and judge from New Hampshire
- Maurice Harvey (born 1956), American football player
- Megan Harvey, American voice actress
- Merv Harvey (1918–1995), Australian cricketer
- Merv Harvey (footballer) (1922–1987), Australian rules footballer
- Michael Harvey Jr. or Harvey (rapper) (born 1979), British rapper and member of So Solid Crew
- Michael Harvey (author), American author
- Michael Harvey (died 1748), British landowner and politician
- Michael Harvey (lettering artist) (1931–2013), English lettering artist, teacher and writer
- Michael Harvey (racewalker) (born 1962), retired Australian race walker
- Michael Harvey (taekwondo) (born 1989), British taekwondo athlete
- Michael Brown Harvey, herpetologist, see wikispecies:Michael Brown Harvey
- Michael Kieran Harvey (born 1961), Australian pianist and composer
- Michael Martin Harvey (1897–1975), English actor
- Michael C. Harvey (fl. 1884), African American inventor
- M. S. Harvey (Michael Smith Harvey, 1881–1958), American football coach
- Michel Harvey (1938–2017), Canadian ice hockey player
- Michelle Harvey, Australian forensic scientist
- Mick Harvey (Michael John Harvey, born 1958), Australian musician, arranger and record producer
- Mick Harvey (umpire) (1921–2016), Australian cricketer and umpire
- Mikayla Harvey (born 1998), New Zealand road racing cyclist
- Miles Harvey (born 1960), American author
- Miles Harvey (cricketer) (born 1946), South African cricketer
- Monique Harvey (1950–2001), Canadian painter
- Morris Harvey (1877–1944), British actor and writer
- Morton Harvey (1886–1961), American vaudeville performer and singer
- Moses Harvey (1820–1901), Newfoundland clergyman, essayist and naturalist
- Muriel Martin-Harvey (1891–1988), English stage actress
- Murray Harvey, Australian Anglican bishop

== N ==
- Natalie Harvey (born 1975), Australian long-distance runner
- Nate Harvey (born 1996), American football player
- Nathaniel Harvey (1950–2020), American murderer
- Neil Harvey (born 1928), Australian cricketer
- Neil Harvey (footballer) (born 1983), Barbadian footballer
- Neil Harvey (squash player) (born 1959), English squash player
- Nicholas Harvey (MP for Huntingdonshire) (died 1532), English Member of Parliament
- Nicole Harvey (born 1992), English cricketer
- Nick Harvey (born 1961), British politician
- Nick Harvey (cricketer) (born 1973), English cricketer
- Nick Harvey (musician) (born 1971), British composer and producer
- Nikki Harvey, English Ten-pin bowler
- Norm Harvey (1899–1941), American football player
- Norman Harvey (1899–1942), English soldier

== O ==
- Obed Harvey (born 1990), Ghanaian cricketer
- Oliver Harvey (footballer) (born 1993), Bermudian football player
- Oliver Harvey (labor organizer) (1909–?), American labor organizer
- Oliver Harvey, 1st Baron Harvey of Tasburgh (1893–1968), British civil servant and diplomat

== P ==
- PJ Harvey (born 1969), British singer and songwriter
- Pat Harvey (born 1955), American broadcast journalist
- Patrick Harvey (actor) (born 1984), Irish-Australian actor
- Patrick Harvey (pentathlete) (born 1935), British modern pentathlete
- Patrick Harvey (rugby union, born 1925), Australian rugby union footballer
- Patrick Harvey (rugby union, born 1880) (1880–1949), New Zealand rugby union footballer
- Paul Harvey (1918–2009), American radio broadcaster
- Paul Harvey Jr. (born 1948/9), American pianist and radio broadcaster
- Paul Harvey (actor) (1882–1955), American film actor
- Paul Harvey (artist) (born 1960), British musician and Stuckist artist
- Paul Harvey (boxer) (born 1964), English boxer of the 1980s and 1990s
- Paul Harvey (diplomat) (1869–1948), British diplomat and editor
- Paul Harvey (footballer) (born 1968), Scottish footballer
- Paul Harvey (pianist) (born 1940), British pianist and composer
- Paul H. Harvey (born 1947), British evolutionary biologist
- Paula Harvey (born 1975), Australian sprint canoeist
- Pauline Harvey (born 1950), Canadian writer from Quebec
- Penny Harvey (born 1956), British anthropologist and academic
- Peter Harvey (1944–2013), Australian journalist and broadcaster
- Peter Harvey (academic) (born 1951), British scholar of Buddhism
- Peter Harvey (baritone), (born 1958), English singer
- Peter Harvey (cricketer, born 1923) (1923–2006), English cricketer
- Peter Harvey (cricketer, born 1926) (1926–1966), English cricketer
- Peter Harvey (writer) (1798–1877), American merchant and author
- Peter C. Harvey, American lawyer
- Phil Harvey (1938–2021), American entrepreneur, philanthropist and libertarian
- Phil Harvey (music manager) (born 1976), English manager and creative director
- Philip James Benedict Harvey (1915–2003), English Catholic bishop
- Pierre Harvey (born 1957), Canadian athlete
- Prince Harvey, American rapper

== R ==
- Rachel Hyde-Harvey (born 1987), English actress and singer
- Rafaël Harvey-Pinard (born 1999), Canadian ice hockey player
- Ralph Harvey (1901–1991), American politician
- R. H. Harvey (Ralph Hicks Harvey) (1893–1950), American judge in Texas
- Ray Harvey (1926–2011), Australian cricketer
- Ray Harvey (footballer) (1929–2003), Australian rules footballer
- Raymond Harvey (1920–1996), United States Army officer, recipient of the Medal of Honor
- Raymond Lee Harvey (born 1944/5), American drifter
- Rex Harvey (1946–2019), American decathlete
- Richard Harvey (American football) (born 1966), American football player
- Richard Harvey (astrologer) (1560–1630), English theologian and controversialist
- Richard Harvey (composer) (born 1953), British composer and multi-instrumentalist
- Richard Harvey (cricketer) (born 1974), English cricketer
- Richard Harvey (footballer) (born 1969), English football player
- Richard Harvey (politician) (born 1985), Australian politician
- Richard Harvey (priest) (1864–1944), British clergyman
- Richard Harvey (scientist), Australian molecular biologist
- Rob Harvey (special effects artist), Academy Award-winning special effects artist
- Robert Harvey (Australian politician) (1897–1968), member of the Tasmanian Parliament
- Robert Harvey (businessman) (1847–1930), British saltpetre producer in South America
- Robert Harvey (Clwyd politician) (born 1953), British historian and politician
- Robert Harvey (cricketer) (1911–2000), South African cricketer
- Robert Harvey (footballer) (born 1971), Australian rules footballer and coach
- Robert Harvey (literary theorist) (born 1951), American literary scholar and academic
- Robert Harvey (musician) (born 1983), British musician
- Robert B. Harvey, co-founder of Harvey Comics
- Sir Robert Harvey, 1st Baronet, of Crown Point (1817–1870), British politician
- Sir Robert Harvey, 1st Baronet of Langley Park (1825–1887), British politician
- RJ Harvey (Robert Harvey Jr.) (born 2001), American football player
- Roberta Geddes-Harvey (1849–1930), Canadian organist, choirmaster and composer
- Robin Harvey, English sportsman
- Robin Adair Harvey (born 1965/6), American field hockey player and coach
- Rodney Harvey (1967–1998), American actor, model, singer and dancer
- Roger Harvey (1913–1976), English soldier and public official
- R. C. Harvey (1937–2022), American author, critic and cartoonist
- Roland Harvey (born 1945), Australian illustrator and author
- Ron Harvey (Australian rules footballer) (1935–1991), Australian rules footballer
- Ron Harvey (rugby union) (born 1933), Australian rugby union footballer
- Ronald Harvey (administrator) (born 1934), Australian public servant and sport administrator
- Ronald Harvey (cricketer) (born 1934), English cricketer
- Rose Harvey (born 1992), British long-distance runner
- Ross Harvey (born 1952), Canadian politician
- Roy Harvey (1921–2006), Australian politician
- Roy Harvey (musician) (1892–1958), American old time guitar player, singer and songwriter
- R. James Harvey (Russell James Harvey) (1922–2019), American politician and jurist from Michigan

== S ==
- Samantha Harvey (born 1975), English novelist
- Samantha Harvey (pentathlete) (born 1972), Brazilian modern pentathlete
- Samantha Harvey (singer) (born 1993), English singer, songwriter and YouTuber
- Samuel Harvey (VC) (1881–1960), British Victoria Cross recipient
- Samuel Harvey (politician) (1885–1959), British politician
- Samuel Harvey (footballer) (born 2009), Turks and Caicos Islands football goalkeeper
- Sara M. Harvey (born 1976), American costume designer and author
- Sarah Harvey (born 1995), Australian BMX rider
- Scott Harvey (born 1978), American golfer
- Sebastian Harvey (died 1621), English merchant, Lord Mayor of London in 1618
- Shane Harvey (born 1983), Australian rules footballer
- Shaun Harvey (born 1970), English football executive
- Shawn Harvey (basketball) (born 1973), American basketball player
- Shawn Harvey (singer-songwriter) (born 1971), English singer and musician
- Sheila Harvey, Scottish curler
- Shelly Harvey, American mathematician
- Simon Harvey, British actor and film director from Cornwall
- Siobhan Harvey (born 1973), New Zealand-British author, editor and creative writing lecturer
- Solange Harvey (1930–2008), French-Canadian journalist, columnist and writer
- Stella Harvey (born 1956), Canadian author
- Stephanie Harvey (born 1986), Canadian professional gamer and video game developer
- Stephen Harvey (architect) (1879–1933), English architect in Australia
- Stephen Harvey (biologist) (born 1940), American structural biologist
- Stephen Harvey (author) (died 1993), author, film critic, and curator
- Stephen Harvey (cricketer) (born 1964), English cricketer
- Steve Harvey (born 1957), American comedian and television host
- Steven C. Harvey (born 1967), British visual artist
- Stu Harvey, Australian radio announcer
- Susan Ashbrook Harvey (born 1953), American classical scholar
- Suzanne Harvey, American politician

== T ==
- Tamara Harvey, British theatre director
- Ted Harvey, American politician
- Terence Harvey (1944–2017), British television actor
- Thomas Harvey (Royal Navy officer) (1775–1841), British Royal Naval officer
- Thomas Harvey (North Carolina governor) (1668–1699), colonial governor of North Carolina
- Thomas Stoltz Harvey (1912–2007), American pathologist
- Thomas Harvey (16th-century MP) (c. 1512–1577), British politician
- Thomas Harvey (cyclist) (1888–1965), British cyclist at the 1920 Summer Olympics
- Thomas B. Harvey (1827–1889), American medical doctor
- Thomas H. Harvey Jr. (1936–2013), American Army officer
- T. J. Harvey (Thomas J. Harvey, born 1982), Canadian politician in New Brunswick
- Thomas W. Harvey (1893–1978), African-American activist
- Tim Harvey (born 1961), British racing driver
- Tim Harvey (production designer) (born 1936), British production designer
- Tim Harvey (born 1961), British racing driver, winner of the BTCC in 1992 and media personality
- Todd Harvey (born 1975), Canadian ice hockey player
- Tom Harvey, English media executive and playwright
- Tom Harvey (cricketer) (born 1980), English cricketer
- Tommy Harvey (born 1933), South African lawn bowler
- Tony Harvey (basketball), American basketball coach
- Tracene Harvey, Canadian curator and author
- Tracy Harvey, Australian comedian, TV presenter, actor and writer
- Trevor Harvey (politician) (1885–1952), Australian politician
- Trevor Harvey (conductor) (1911–1989), English conductor
- Trevor Harvey (basketball) (born 1980), Bahamian basketball player
- Trevor Harvey (soccer) (1916–1988), Canadian soccer player
- Trice Harvey (1936–2017), American politician
- Tye Harvey (born 1974), American pole vaulter
- Tyler Harvey (basketball) (born 1993), American basketball player
- Tyler Harvey (footballer) (born 1995), English footballer

== V ==
- Valérie Harvey (born 1979), Canadian writer and sociologist
- Van A. Harvey (1923–2021), American Christian theologian
- Vinny Harvey (1937–2022), Irish Gaelic footballer and manager

== W ==
- Waddey Harvey (1947–1997), American football player
- Walter J. Harvey (1903–1979), British cinematographer
- Wilhelmina Celeste Goehring Harvey (1912–2005), American philanthropist and mayor
- Will Harvey (born 1966/67), American software developer and businessman
- William Frederick James Harvey (1897–1972), British flying ace
- William Harvey (1578–1657), English physician
- William Harvey (1882–1954), South Australian politician
- William Harvey (artist) (1796–1866), English wood-engraver
- William Harvey (Bible Christian) (1787–1870, English cotton mill owner and deacon
- William Harvey (Canadian politician) (1821–1874), Canadian politician
- William Harvey (officer of arms) (1510–1567), English herald
- William Harvey (priest) (1810–1883), English cleric and academic
- William Harvey (1754–1779), British Member of Parliament
- William Alexander Harvey (1874–1951), English architect
- William Bruce Harvey (1906–1954), Canadian politician
- William Edwin Harvey (general) (1871–1922), lawyer and U.S. Army officer
- William Frederick Harvey (1873–1948), Scottish expert on public health
- William Frederick James Harvey (1897–1972), World War I flying ace
- William Henry Harvey (1811–1866), Irish botanist and phycologist
- William Hope Harvey (1851–1936), American lawyer, author and politician
- William Humphrey Harvey (1869–1935), South Australian politician
- William James St. John Harvey (1872–1916), British Army officer
- William King Harvey (1915–1976), American Central Intelligence Agency officer
- William West Harvey (1869–1958), American judge
- William F. Harvey (fl. 1980s), American law professor
- William R. Harvey (born 1941), African-American educator, academic administrator and businessman
- William S. Harvey (1920–1993), American graphic designer and art director
- W. Brantley Harvey Jr. (1930–2018), American politician
- W. Brantley Harvey Sr. (1893–1981), American politician
- W. E. Harvey (William Edwin Harvey, 1852–1914), British Member of Parliament
- W. F. Harvey (1885–1937), English writer of short stories
- Willie Harvey (footballer) (1929–2014), Scottish footballer
- Willie Harvey Jr. (born 1996), American football player
- Wilson Godfrey Harvey (1866–1932), Governor of South Carolina

== Y ==
- Yona Harvey (born 1974), American poet and academic

== Z ==
- Zachary Harvey, American politician
- Zaza Harvey (1879–1954), American baseball player

== See also ==
- Harvey-Kelly
- Harvie (surname)
- Hervey (surname)
