= James Harvey =

James or Jim Harvey may refer to:

== Politics ==
- James G. Harvey (1869–1950), politician in Manitoba, Canada
- James M. Harvey (politician) (1833–1894), US senator from Kansas and Governor of Kansas
- R. James Harvey (1922–2019), politician and jurist from the U.S. state of Michigan
- Sir James Harvey (merchant) (died 1583), Lord Mayor of London in 1581
- James Harvey (Australian politician) (died 1912), New South Wales politician

== Sports ==
- James Harvey (basketball) (born 1979), Australian basketball player
- Jamie Harvey (1955–2025), Scottish darts player
- Jim Harvey (born 1958), Northern Irish footballer
- James Harvey (footballer) (1911–?), English football goalkeeper
- Jim Harvey (American football) (1943–2017), American football player
- James Harvey (offensive lineman) (born 1965), American football player
- James Harvey (quarterback) (born 1967), American football player

== Others ==
- James Michael Harvey (born 1949), Roman Catholic cardinal, former prefect of the Papal Household
- James Harvey (artist) (1929–1965), American commercial and fine artist
- James Harvey (film critic), American film critic and writer
- James B. Harvey, served as the International Commissioner of Scouts Canada
- James H. Harvey (born 1923), member of the Tuskegee Airmen
- Jim Harvey (firearms), American designer of firearms
- James Harvey, African-American man lynched on July 1, 1922, see Lynching of James Harvey and Joe Jordan
