= Stephen Harvey =

Stephen Harvey may refer to:

- Stephen Harvey (biologist) (born 1940), structural biologist
- Stephen Harvey (architect) (1879–1933), English-born architect in Queensland, Australia
- Stephen Harvey (author) (died 1993), author, film critic, and curator
- Stephen Harvey (cricketer) (born 1964), English cricketer
- A pseudonym used by A. D. Harvey

== See also ==
- Steve Harvey (born 1957), American comedian and television host
