= Thomas Harvey =

Thomas Harvey may refer to:

- Thomas Harvey (Royal Navy officer) (1775–1841), British Royal Naval officer
- Thomas Harvey (North Carolina governor) (1668–1699), colonial governor of North Carolina
- Thomas Arnold Harvey (1878–1966), Irish sportsman and clergyman
- Thomas Stoltz Harvey (1912–2007), American pathologist, performed autopsy on Albert Einstein's brain
- Edmund Harvey (social reformer) (Thomas Edmund Harvey, 1875–1955), British MP for Leeds West, 1910–1918, Dewsbury, 1923–1924, and Combined English Universities, 1937–1945
- Thomas Harvey (16th-century MP) (c. 1512–1577), British MP for Orford
- Thomas Harvey (cyclist) (1888–1965), British cyclist at the 1920 and 1924 Summer Olympics
- Thomas B. Harvey (1827–1889), medical doctor who served as the examining surgeon for Union soldiers in Indianapolis
- Thomas H. Harvey Jr. (1936–2013), American Army officer
- T. J. Harvey (Thomas J. Harvey, born 1982), Canadian politician in New Brunswick
- Thomas W. Harvey (1893–1978), African-American activist, president of the Universal Negro Improvement Association and African Communities League
- Thomas Harvey (Quaker) (1812–1884) Leeds Quaker and Chemist, manufacturer the first commercially available small clinical thermometer
- Thomas Harvey, rector of Edinburgh Academy
- Tom Harvey, English media executive and playwright
- Tom Harvey (cricketer) (born 1980), English cricketer for Kent and Cambridgeshire

== See also ==
- Thomas Hervey (disambiguation)
