= Peter Harvey (disambiguation) =

Peter Harvey (1944–2013) was an Australian journalist and broadcaster.

Peter Harvey may also refer to:

- Peter Harvey (writer) (1798–1877), American merchant and author
- Peter Harvey (cricketer, born 1926) (1926–1966), English cricketer
- Peter Harvey (cricketer, born 1923) (1923–2006), English cricketer
- Peter Harvey (baritone) (born 1958), English baritone
- Peter C. Harvey, first African American to serve as New Jersey Attorney General
- Peter Harvey (academic) (born 1951), writer and academic scholar on Buddhism
