= Nicholas Harvey =

Nicholas or Nick Harvey may refer to:

- Nick Harvey (born 1961), British politician, MP for North Devon
- Nick Harvey (cricketer) (born 1973), English cricketer
- Nick Harvey (musician) (born 1972), British composer and producer
- Nicholas Harvey (MP for Huntingdonshire) (died 1532), English member of parliament

== See also ==
- Nicholas Hervey (1961–1998), British peer and politician, son of the 6th Marquess of Bristol
