= Matt Harvey (disambiguation) =

Matt Harvey (born 1989) is an American baseball pitcher.

Matt Harvey or Matthew Harvey may also refer to:

- Matthew Harvey (1781–1866), American lawyer, jurist and politician
- Matt Harvey (poet), English performance poet
- Matt T. Harvey, American journalist
- Matt Harvey, death metal guitarist and vocalist of Exhumed (band)
- Matt Harvey, a character in The Onedin Line, a British television serial
- Matt Harvey, a character in Teachers (British TV series)
