= Michael Harvey =

Michael Harvey may refer to:

== Music ==
- Michael Kieran Harvey (born 1961), Australian pianist
- Harvey (rapper) (Michael Harvey Jr., born 1979), British rapper and former member of So Solid Crew
- Mick Harvey (Michael John Harvey, born 1958), Australian musician, singer-songwriter, composer, arranger and record producer

== Politics ==
- Michael Harvey (died 1712), British Member of Parliament for Weymouth and Melcombe Regis
- Michael Harvey (died 1748), British Member of Parliament for Milborne Port

== Sports ==
- Michel Harvey (1938–2017), Canadian former professional ice hockey player
- Michael Harvey (racewalker) (born 1962), retired Australian race walker
- Michael Harvey (taekwondo) (born 1989), British taekwondo athlete
- M. S. Harvey (Michael Smith Harvey, 1881–1958), American football coach
- Mick Harvey (umpire) (1921–2016), Australian cricketer and umpire
- Mike Harvey (long jumper), American long jumper, 1968 indoor All-American for the Virginia Cavaliers track and field team

== Other ==
- Michael Harvey (lettering artist) (1931–2013), English lettering artist, teacher and writer
- Michael C. Harvey, African American inventor
- Michael Harvey, Director of the Botanic Gardens and State Herbarium in Adelaide, South Australia from July 2021
- Michael Martin Harvey (1897–1975), British actor
- Michael Harvey (author), American author

== See also ==
- Harvey (name)
