= Shawn Harvey =

Shawn Harvey may refer to:

- Shawn Harvey (singer-songwriter) (born 1971), English singer and musician
- Shawn Harvey (basketball) (born 1973), American basketball player
- Shawn Harvey (sailor), American competitive sailor

== See also ==
- Shaun Harvey (born 1970), English football executive
