= Edmund Harvey (disambiguation) =

Edmund Harvey was a politician and soldier.

Edmund Harvey may also refer to:

- Edmund Harvey (footballer) (1900–?), English footballer
- Edmund Arthur Harvey (1907–1994), British-Australian artist
- Edmund Harvey (social reformer) (1875–1955), British politician and social reformer
- Edmund Harvey (cricketer) (1852–1902), English cricketer
- E. Newton Harvey (1887–1959), American zoologist
