= Harvie (surname) =

Harvie is a surname, and may refer to:

- Arthur Harvie (1869–1905), English Unitarian minister and activist
- Bob Harvie (radio announcer) (died 2010), announcer with Radio Ceylon
- Bob Harvie (politician), U.S. Representative-elect from Ohio
- Christopher Harvie (born 1944), Scottish historian and politician
- Daniel Harvie (born 1998), Scottish footballer
- David Harvie, Scottish footballer
- Derek Harvie (born 1971), Canadian TV and film writer and producer
- Ellie Harvie (born 1965), Canadian actress
- Ellison Harvie (1902–1984), Australian architect
- Eric Harvie (1892–1975), Canadian lawyer and oilman
- George Harvie (politician) (born c.1951), Canadian politician
- George Harvie-Watt (1903–1989), British politician
- Iain Harvie (born 1962), guitarist with Del Amitri
- Ian Harvie, American stand-up comedian
- Jake Harvie (born 1998), Australian field hockey player
- John Harvie Sr. (1706–1767), Scottish immigrant, planter, and guardian of Thomas Jefferson, father of John Harvie
- John Harvie (1742–1807), American lawyer and builder, Founding Father from Virginia
- John Harvie (footballer), Scottish footballer
- John Alexander Harvie-Brown (1844–1916), Scottish ornithologist and naturalist
- Lewis Harvie (1782–1807), American lawyer and politician from Virginia
- Matt Harvie (born 1984), New Zealand cricketer
- Patrick Harvie (born 1973), Scottish politician
- Sidney Harvie-Clark (1905–1991), British Anglican priest
- Tom Harvie (born 2000), Australian field hockey player
- Walter Harvie (1891–1969), New Zealand cricketer

== See also ==
- Harvey (surname)
