= Ronald Harvey =

Ronald or Ron Harvey may refer to:

- Ronald Harvey (administrator) (born 1934), Australian public servant and sport administrator
- Ronald Harvey (cricketer) (born 1934), English cricketer
- Ron Harvey (Australian rules footballer) (1935–1991), Australian rules footballer
- Ron Harvey (rugby union) (born 1933), Australian rugby union player
