= Four Notes – Paul's Tune =

Single by Paul Harvey & BBC Philharmonic
- Released: 22 October 2020
- Length: 2:37
- Label: Redrocca
- Songwriters: Daniel Whibley; Paul Harvey

"Four Notes – Paul's Tune" is a song performed by Paul Harvey and the BBC Philharmonic. The song was released as a digital download on 22 October 2020. Proceeds from the song were split between the Alzheimer's Society and Music for Dementia. The song peaked at number thirty-two on the UK Singles Chart, and number one on the UK Singles Download Chart.

== Background ==
Paul Harvey went viral in September 2020, when son Nick posted a video online of an "old party trick" where Paul (a former music teacher living with dementia) composed a song from just four notes. It was picked up by BBC Radio 4's Broadcasting House for World Alzheimer's Day; The show's host later arranged for the BBC Philharmonic Orchestra to record the song.

== Chart performance ==
On 2 November 2020, the song was at number seventy-one on the Official Chart Update in the UK. On 4 November 2020 the song was heading for the official UK top twenty with over 11,000 downloads. On 6 November 2020, the song entered the UK Singles Chart at number thirty-two, the song also reached number one on the UK Singles Downloads Chart and Scottish Singles Chart.

== Track listing ==
Digital download
No.	Title	Length
1.	"Four Notes – Paul's Tune"	2:37

== Personnel ==
Credits adapted from Tidal.

- Daniel Whibley – Composer
- Paul Harvey – Composer
- BBC Philharmonic – Orchestra

== Charts ==
Chart (2020)	Peak position
Scotland Singles (OCC)	1
UK Singles (OCC)	32
UK Singles Downloads (OCC)	1

== Release history ==
Region	Date	Format	Label
United States	22 October 2020	Digital download; streaming	Redrocca
