= .22 Remington Jet =

Revolver and rifle cartridge

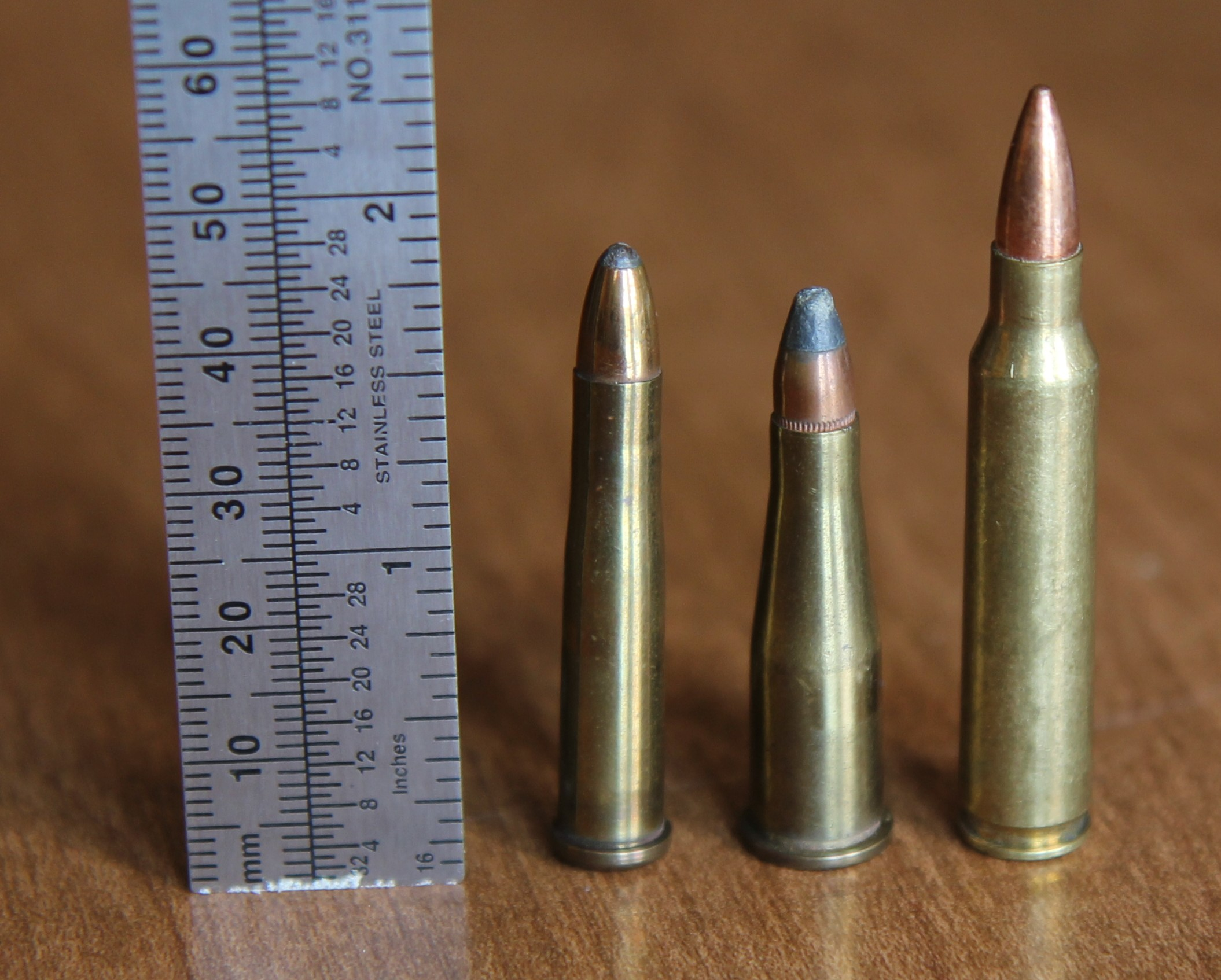
- .22 Remington Jet (center) with .22 Hornet (left) and .223 Rem (right).
- Type: Revolver and rifle
- Place of origin: US

Production history
- Designer: Remington and Smith & Wesson
- Designed: 1961
- Produced: 1961–present

Specifications
- Case type: Rimmed, bottleneck
- Bullet diameter: .222 in (5.6 mm)
- Neck diameter: .247 in (6.3 mm)
- Shoulder diameter: .350 in (8.9 mm)
- Base diameter: .376 in (9.6 mm)
- Rim diameter: .440 in (11.2 mm)
- Case length: 1.28 in (33 mm)
- Overall length: 1.58 in (40 mm)
- Rifling twist: 1:10
- Primer type: Small pistol
- Maximum CUP: 40,000 CUP

Ballistic performance
Bullet mass/type	Velocity	Energy
40 gr (3 g)	1,710 ft/s (520 m/s)	261 ft⋅lbf (354 J)
40 gr (3 g)	1,700 ft/s (520 m/s)	258 ft⋅lbf (350 J)
45 gr (3 g)	1,630 ft/s (500 m/s)	267 ft⋅lbf (362 J)
- Test barrel length: 8 1/2 in (22 cm); Source(s): Barnes & Amber 1972

The .22 Remington Jet (5.6x33mmR) is a .22 in (5.6mm) American centerfire revolver and rifle cartridge. The round is known in the US as .22 Jet, .22 Center Fire Magnum/.22 CFM or .22 Rem Jet.

== Development ==
Developed jointly by Remington and Smith & Wesson, it was to be used in the Model 53 revolver, which first appeared late in 1961. While it traced its origins to potent wildcats such as the .224 Harvey Kay-Chuk, which ultimately derive from the .22 Hornet, it was a bottlenecked cartridge based upon the .357 Magnum case necked down to a .22 caliber bullet, with an unusually long tapered shoulder.

By 1972, the Model 53 remained the only revolver chambered for it, while Marlin in 1972 was planning a lever rifle in .22 Jet. The .22 Jet was also a factory chambering for the Thompson/Center Contender and the design allowed for it to reach its full potential, having no cylinder gap and no case setback.

== Usage ==
The .22 Jet was designed as a flat-shooting hunting round for handguns, and it is suitable for handgun hunting of varmints and medium game out to 100 yd (90 m). The 2460 ft/s (750 m/s) and 535 ft-lbf (725 J) claimed for factory test loads did not prove out in service weapons.

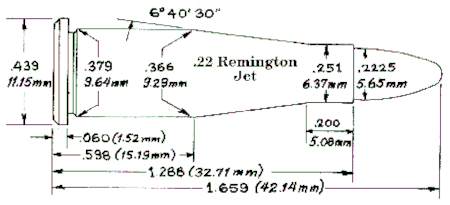
.22 Remington Jet dimensions

== See also ==
- .22 Hornet
- .22 Spitfire
- .221 Remington Fireball
- List of cartridges by caliber
- 5mm caliber
- FN 5.7×28mm

== Sources ==
- Barnes, Frank C., ed. by John T. Amber. ".22 Remington Jet", in Cartridges of the World, pp. 148, & 177. Northfield, IL: DBI Books, 1972. ISBN 0-695-80326-3.
- ______ & _____. ".224 Harvey Kay-Chuk", in Cartridges of the World, pp. 131. Northfield, IL: DBI Books, 1972. ISBN 0-695-80326-3.
