= Paul Harvey (pianist) =

British pianist and composer

Paul Harvey OBE
- Born: 29 January 1940 (age 86); Stoke-on-Trent, England
- Occupations: Concert pianist; Composer
- Instrument: Piano

Paul Ragle Harvey OBE (born 29 January 1940) is a British composer and former concert pianist. After being diagnosed with Alzheimer's disease in 2019, he rose to prominence in September 2020 following a viral video of him playing the piano. The video led to Harvey performing with the BBC Philharmonic Orchestra and recording a number-one single.

== Early life and education ==
Harvey was born on 29 January 1940 in Stoke-on-Trent. He played piano from an early age, completing his first-grade exam at the age of four. At 15, he completed his Grade 8 exam, achieving one of the best results in the United Kingdom. When he was 18, Harvey moved to London to study at the Guildhall School of Music. It was during this time that he met Sue, who later gave birth to Nick, Harvey's eldest son.

== Career ==
After graduating from the Guildhall School of Music, Harvey began work as a composer and pianist. One of his compositions, Rumba Toccata, is used regularly on the Grade 6 piano syllabus. He was featured in the BBC Home Service's Variety Playhouse in 1964 when he played a piece by Mozart.

Around the time of his son Nick's birth, Harvey became a teacher at Imberhorne School in East Grinstead. He taught there for 20 years and became head of music. Other experiences teaching included working at a summer school organised by musicians Cleo Laine and John Dankworth. It was at that course that his son Nick recalled he first heard his father improvise in his signature four notes style.

== Later life ==
Harvey was moved into sheltered housing in 2015 and was diagnosed with Alzheimer's disease in 2019. To help fight the onset of the disease he plays the piano, sometimes through the persuasion of his son Nick. One such occasion was on 17 September 2020, when Nick asked his father to improvise a song using only four notes: F, A, D and B. The two-minute long performance was recorded and uploaded to Nick's Twitter account. The clip went viral and gained over 2 million views. It was aired on BBC Radio 4 on 21 September for World Alzheimer's Day.

Harvey was invited onto Good Morning Britain as a guest following the viral video. On the program, he was requested by Susanna Reid to create another four-note improvisation using the notes C, D, G and B.

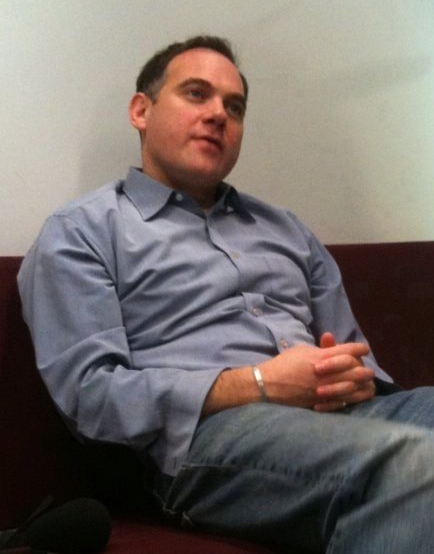
Paddy O'Connell arranged for Harvey to make a recording of "Four Notes - Paul's Tune" with the BBC Philharmonic

After radio listeners requested an orchestral version of the song, Paddy O'Connell arranged for Harvey to record the piece as a charity single with the BBC Philharmonic. Due to the COVID-19 pandemic, this took place remotely, with all orchestra members recording and submitting their parts from home. The piece was arranged for the orchestra by Daniel Whibley. The finished version was entitled "Four Notes – Paul's Tune". It was broadcast on BBC Radio 4 on 3 October. The single was released to purchase as a digital download on 22 October.

Harvey's playing inspired the Scottish billionaire Sir Tom Hunter to donate £1 million to charity. Hunter and his wife found the performance while watching BBC Breakfast. The donation was split between Music for Dementia and the Alzheimer's Society. Music for Dementia used the money to set up the Paul & Nick Harvey fund. The fund distributed money to charities that support people with dementia through music. Over 170 charities applied for funding, with 27 achieving grants of £5,000–50,000.

Stephen Sondheim, lyricist of West Side Story, contacted Harvey after seeing the video. In a video message to Harvey given through the BBC, he called the piece "very special" and said that he "can't wait to steal" it. Sondheim was Harvey's favourite composer.

For his charity work, Harvey was honoured with an Outstanding Achievement Award at the virtually hosted Dementia Hero Awards in 2021. He was one of three finalists. Harvey was surprised with the honour, stating that he "was really quite shocked to win".

Music for Dementia later arranged for Harvey to perform with the BBC Philharmonic to mark the first anniversary of the original video. The performance consisted of Harvey playing "Four Notes" on the piano as well as conducting arrangements of "Four Notes" and "Where's the Sunshine", a song he wrote for a musical at Imberhorne School. His son Nick played the piano. The performance was broadcast on BBC Breakfast. Harvey was moved by the experience, calling it "magical" and "very, very special".

In December 2021, Harvey and Nick collaborated with singer Aled Jones to create a Christmas charity single. The end result was titled "Christmas Isn't Just Another Day". The single was made for Music for Dementia's m4d radio station.

Harvey was appointed Officer of the Order of the British Empire (OBE) in the 2023 Birthday Honours for services to charity and people living with Alzheimer's and dementia.

== Musical works ==
- "Four Notes – Paul's Tune" – originally an improvisation using only four notes: a charity single released in 2020. The song is a collaboration between Harvey, Daniel Whibley and the BBC Philharmonic. It reached number 32 on the UK singles chart and number 1 on the UK singles download chart. The single raised over £1 million; all proceeds were donated to Music for Dementia and the Alzheimer's Society. It was featured on the Now That's What I Call Music! album.
- "Where's the Sunshine" – Harvey wrote this song in 1981 for a school show at Imberhorne School. The lyrics to the song were written by Pete Talman, head of drama at the school.
- Christmas Isn't Just Another Day – a charity Christmas single created with Nick Harvey and Aled Jones. Lyrics to the song were provided by Pete Talman. The single was broadcast through Music for Dementia's m4d radio station.
