= J. Andrew McCammon =

American physical chemist

James Andrew McCammon (born 1947, Lafayette, Indiana, US) is an American physical chemist known for his application of principles and methods from theoretical and computational chemistry to biological systems. He was Distinguished Research Professor of Chemistry and of Pharmacology at the University of California, San Diego, McCammon's research focused on the theoretical aspects of biomolecular and cellular activity. In 2011 he was elected to the National Academy of Sciences.

Prof. McCammon co-authored Dynamics of Proteins and Nucleic Acids (Cambridge University Press, 1987; ISBN 9780521356527), an important contribution to molecular mechanics and molecular dynamics, with Stephen Harvey, while the first published reports on molecular mechanics and molecular dynamics can be found as early as 1976, most likely even earlier.

== Early life ==
McCammon was born in Lafayette, Indiana and attended Pomona College, graduating in 1969 with a B.A. in chemistry. He received his M.A. and Ph.D. from Harvard University. At Harvard he worked with John Deutch on the biological applications of statistical mechanics and theoretical chemist Martin Karplus.

== Career ==
In the 1980s he helped establish computer-aided drug design at Agouron Pharmaceuticals (acquired by Pfizer), contributing to the development of nelfinavir, an HIV-1 protease inhibitor. His work also contributed to the development of raltegravir, the first HIV integrase inhibitor, approved by the US Food and Drug Administration in 2007.

He received the Cray Research Information Technology Leadership Award for Breakthrough Computational Science "for his pioneering use of supercomputing technology in analyzing chemical enzyme inhibitors to fight Alzheimers and other diseases."

== Awards ==
- Member of the National Academy of Sciences (2011)
- American Chemical Society (ACS) National Award for Computers in Chemical and Pharmaceutical Research (2008)
- Elected Fellow, American Academy of Arts and Sciences (2006)
- UCSD SPPS Associated Students Teaching Award (2003)
- UC Chancellor's Associates Award for Research (2002)
- Appointed Investigator, Howard Hughes Medical Institute (2000–present)
- Joseph E. Mayer Chair of Theoretical Chemistry, UC San Diego (1995-)
- Smithsonian Award for Breakthrough Computational Science (1995)
- Cray Research Information Technology Leadership Award (1995)
- George Hitchings Award for Innovative Methods in Drug Design, Burroughs Wellcome Fund (1987–1992)
- Dreyfus Teacher-Scholar Award (1982–87)
- NIH Research Career Development Award (1980–85)
