= Esin Harvey =

Esin Alpogan
- Born: 9 May 1979 (age 47); Ankara, Turkey
- Occupation: Actor
- Years active: 2004–present
- Spouse: Tom Harvey

Esin Alpogan (born 9 May 1979) is a Turkish thespian, movie and tv series actress.

== Life and career ==
Esin Alpogan, was born on 9 May 1979 in Ankara. She is the daughter of diplomat Yiğit Alpogan who was for a period the General Secretary of the MGK. Because of her father’s job she grew up and was schooled in; Switzerland, Holland, Greece and Turkey, at the French schools in those countries. She graduated in 1997 in Ankara from the "Lycee Charles De Gaulle". In her senior year in highschool she worked with Rüştü Asyalı ad the "Lir Müzik ve Sahne Sanatları" school.

She studied in the US at the University of Massachusetts – Amherst (UMASS) at the Theater and Communications department, and in 1999 went on student exchange to London "Goldsmiths College".

After graduating she went to London again in 2001 and in 2002 attended the LAMDAs (London Academy of Music and Dramatic Arts) 8-week Shakespeare workshop and after, entered into the examinations and was selected. In 2004 she graduated from the LAMDA. In 2004 she married Tom Harvey. The thespian who still lives in London presently, speaks English, French, Spanish and Greek to a good degree according to herself.

== Theatre ==
- 2007 – Heroes (Leading role) – National Theatre
- 2009 – The Recognition of Sakuntala (Leading role) – The Union Theatre
- 2009 – Who Will Carry the Word (Leading role) – Courtyard Theatre

== Film and television ==
- 2013 – Ben Onu Çok Sevdim ( Berrin Menderes' assistant Canan) (TV)
- 2014 – Unutma Beni İstanbul (Movie)
- 2014 – Atatürk (Movie)
- 2014 – Çakallarla Dans 3: Sıfır Sıkıntı (Movie)
- 2016 – Naciye (Movie)
- 2022– Aldatmak (TV)
