= Thomas Hervey =

Thomas Hervey may refer to

- Thomas Hervey (politician) (1699–1775), English writer and member of parliament
- Thomas Hervey (landowner) (1625–1693), landowner and member of parliament
- Thomas Kibble Hervey (1799–1859), Scottish poet

== See also ==
- Thomas Harvey (disambiguation)
