= Patrick Harvey (rugby union, born 1925) =

Australian rugby union player

- Born: Patrick B. Harvey c. 1925 Brisbane, Queensland

Rugby union career
- Position: number 8
International career
Years	Team	Apps	(Points)
1949	Wallabies	2	(0)

Patrick B. Harvey (born c. 1925) was a rugby union player who represented Australia.

Harvey, a number 8, was born in Brisbane, Queensland and claimed a total of 2 international rugby caps for Australia.
