= David Harvie =

Scottish footballer

Personal information
- Place of birth: Saltcoats, Scotland
- Position: Full back

Senior career*
Years	Team	Apps	(Gls)
- Stevenston Thistle
1910–1920	Bristol Rovers	219	(1)
- * Club domestic league appearances and goals

David Harvie was a professional footballer who played as a full back in the Southern League for Bristol Rovers between 1910 and 1920.

Harvie joined Rovers in 1910 from Scottish side Stevenston Thistle, on a recommendation from former Bristol Rovers player James Young, and his tough style of play earned him the nickname 'Hit him' Harvey. He retired from football in 1920, after a war-interrupted ten years with the Bristol club.
