= Glenmore Trenear-Harvey =

British intelligence analyst

Glenmore Stratton Trenear-Harvey (born 29 December 1940, died in 2025 at the age of 84 following a long illness.) was a British intelligence analyst who writes, broadcasts and lectures on the subjects of security, intelligence, espionage and terrorism. He was the editor-in-chief of the World Intelligence Review, an associate editor of Eye Spy intelligence magazine, and publisher of Intelligence Digest.

He was an intelligence analyst for Sky News, and also broadcast on NBC, CNN, Al Jazeera, France 24, Russia Today, and the BBC. He hosted the weekly show Energy World several times, on the satellite channel Press TV.

== Biography ==
A former Royal Air Force pilot, Trenear-Harvey was also a station's intelligence officer. He then joined the Air Ministry Book Production & Distribution Centre (AMPDC) at Signals Command HQ, RAF Medmenham, distributing codes & ciphers as an Air Ministry courier. During the years 1969 – 1997 he was a contract agent for the Foreign & Commonwealth Office, while pursuing an international career in business and the media in Africa, Asia, Europe and the United States. He acted as campaign manager for Sir James Goldsmith, chairman of the Referendum Party, in his Putney constituency during the UK general election of 1997. He has run (or ran) the consultancy Intel Research, specialising in open source security & intelligence matters. He has been (or was) a member of the Security & Intelligence Studies Group of the UK Political Association; the Royal United Services Institute for Defence Studies and International Security, the Association of Former Intelligence Officers, and a visiting member of the Woodrow Wilson International Center for Scholars in Washington, D.C.

== Honours and appointments ==
In June 2005, Trenear-Harvey was conferred with a knighthood in the Order of Saints Maurice and Lazarus from the Duke of Savoy. Trenear-Harvey was dubbed by the Earl of Erroll on behalf of the Duke. In 2003, Glenmore Trenear-Harvey was appointed club secretary of the reconstituted "IP dining club", inaugurated in 1919 by Sir Vernon Kell for "Intelligence People". In October 2007, he was appointed a vice-president of the UK National Defence Association.
