= Michelle Harvey =

Australian forensic scientist

Michelle Louise Harvey is an Australian forensic scientist specialising in forensic entomology (use of insects in the investigation of crimes).

== Education ==
Harvey completed her PhD / Master of Forensic Science degree in 2006 at the Centre for Forensic Science at the University of Western Australia (UWA) and graduated in March 2007.

== Career ==
From 2006 to 2012 Harvey was a senior lecturer in forensic biology at the University of Portsmouth, researching molecular relationships between forensically important Calliphoridae.

She returned to Australia to continue her research at Deakin University in Geelong.

Her research utilises insect DNA to identify maggots, which aids in estimating the time since death.

== Other activities ==
Harvey has published extensively on her research and has been a guest speaker at numerous conferences. She is also active in promoting science through public speaking engagements and media appearances.

== Honours and awards ==
- 2001/2002: Rotary Ambassadorial Scholar (University of Pretoria, South Africa)
- 2003: Sir Keith Murdoch Fellow of the American Australian Association (graduate research at the Anthropological Research Facility (known as the Body Farm) in Knoxville, Tennessee)
- 2004: Brownes Western Australian Woman of the Year in Science
- 2013: Winston Churchill Fellowship
