= Monique Harvey =

Canadian painter

Monique "Mo" Harvey
- Born: 4 October 1950; Montreal, Quebec, Canada
- Died: 8 November 2001 (aged 51); Montreal, Quebec, Canada
- Occupation: Painter

Monique "Mo" Harvey (1950–2001) was a Canadian painter who lived and worked in Montreal, Quebec.

== Biography ==
Monique Harvey was born in a popular neighbourhood on Notre-Dame Street in Montreal, Quebec. She was pursuing photography when, at the age of 28, a simple painting class intended to relax her work led to her true vocation. Harvey then took drawing and painting classes, which led toward a Certificate of Fine Arts from the University of Sherbrooke in 1980. Nevertheless, Harvey considered that her approach was largely self-taught.

In 1983 Harvey participated in a first group exhibition at the Old Port of Montréal, where she stood out as a talented and charismatic artist. In 1984 her work was exhibited at the International Arts Festival held at the Palais des congrès de Montréal, at an exhibition of seven painters at the Old Presbytery of Saint-Bruno, and an exhibition at the Mont-Tremblant Festival of Colours where Harvey won the Montréal Businessmen's Award. In 1986 she had a solo exhibition at the Maison d'art Saint-Laurent and in a duo at the Galerie Bernard Larocque in Rimouski. In 1987, she exhibited as a group at the L'Heureux Gallery in Trois-Rivières and then as a solo artist at the Galerie L'Autre Equivoque in Ottawa. In October 1987 she held a major solo exhibition at the Minigal Gallery in Montréal. In 1989 Harvey exhibited at the Whitten Gallery, at the Hollander York Gallery in Toronto, and contributed to the exhibition Les Femmes peintres au Québec (English: Women Painters in Quebec) at the Marc-Aurèle-Fortin Museum (closed 2007) in Montreal (June to September). This museum then invited Harvey to present a retrospective of her works of the past four years.

Harvey continued solo and group shows through the 1990s. This included frequent exhibitions at the Lydia Monaro Art Galleries in Montréal, St-Laurent+Hill in Ottawa, Hollander York Gallery in Toronto, Masters Gallery in Calgary, and Loch & Mayberry in Winnipeg. Group exhibitions included SNBA/MAGAZIN'ART Biennale at the Grand Palais in Paris in 1993, Old Palais Exhibition Center in Saint-Jérôme in 1992–1994, Bali at the Canadian Embassy in Jakarta in 1994, Musée Marc-Aurèle Fortin in Montréal in 1995, the group exhibition Les Femmeuses at Longueuil in 1996, and Entre deux chaises (Between Two Chairs) at the Montréal Museum of Fine Arts in 1998.

Monique Harvey fell ill with cancer and died 8 November 2001 at the age of 51. She left behind a vibrant pictorial heritage, abundant in colour and form, showing great sensitivity.

== Works ==
Monique Harvey was an artist bubbling with ideas, who ended up finding her own style. Always with new subjects, she gave free rein to her imagination and worked in a very impulsive way.

Je commence par faire un fond coloré, puis je disperse des taches de couleur un peu partout sur la toile et, soudainement, des formes apparaissent et je les complète, selon l'inspiration du moment. Sans rien corriger, une table peut avoir huit pattes, une chaise trois... c'est mon petit côté irrationnel [Cependant, pour elle, ce qui comptait réellement, c'est] de surprendre, de réveiller quelque chose qui fait vibrer. Chaque tableau est un état d'âme. Pour créer, il ne faut pas avoir peur de prendre des risques, de sortir des règles établies, de l'académisme...

—Monique Harvey
Translation:

I start by making a coloured background, then I scatter coloured spots everywhere on the canvas and, suddenly, forms appear and I complete them, according to the inspiration of the moment. Without correcting anything, a table can have eight legs, a chair three ... it's my little irrational side [However, for her, what really mattered is] to surprise, to awaken something that makes you vibrate. Each painting is a state of mind. To create, do not be afraid to take risks, to get out of established rules, academism...

For Harvey, subjects matter little: she improvises each painting as a space built through distortions and disproportions that create their own harmony, creating order in the apparent mess that often furnishes her compositions.

Guy Robert (1933–2000), founder in 1964 of the Museum of Contemporary Art of Montréal and author of several monographs on the painters who marked Quebec, said of her in 1987 that "la relève la plus dynamique et la plus solide devrait ressembler à cela" ("the most dynamic and the most dynamic succession should look like this").
