= William James St John Harvey =

Brigadier-General William James St John Harvey
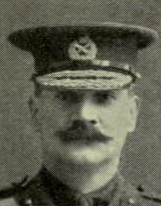
- Born: 17 September 1872
- Died: 1 February 1916 (aged 43); Amara War Cemetery
- Military career
- Allegiance: United Kingdom
- Branch: British Army
- Service years: 1892–1916
- Rank: Brigadier-General
- Unit: Black Watch
- Commands: 19th Indian Brigade; 1st Battalion, Black Watch
- Conflicts: Second Boer War; First World War
- Awards: Mentioned in Despatches (4)

Brigadier-General William James St John Harvey (17 September 1872 – 1 February 1916) was a British Army officer. He died of wounds, sustained at the Battle of Hanna, in 1916. At the time, he was in command of the 19th Indian Brigade, 7th Indian Division.

== Early life and military career ==
His military career began in November 1892 when he was commissioned as a lieutenant into the Black Watch in November 1892, after having graduated from the Royal Military College, Sandhurst.
