= Lynching of James Harvey and Joe Jordan =

Lynching of two African-American men

- Part of Jim Crow Era
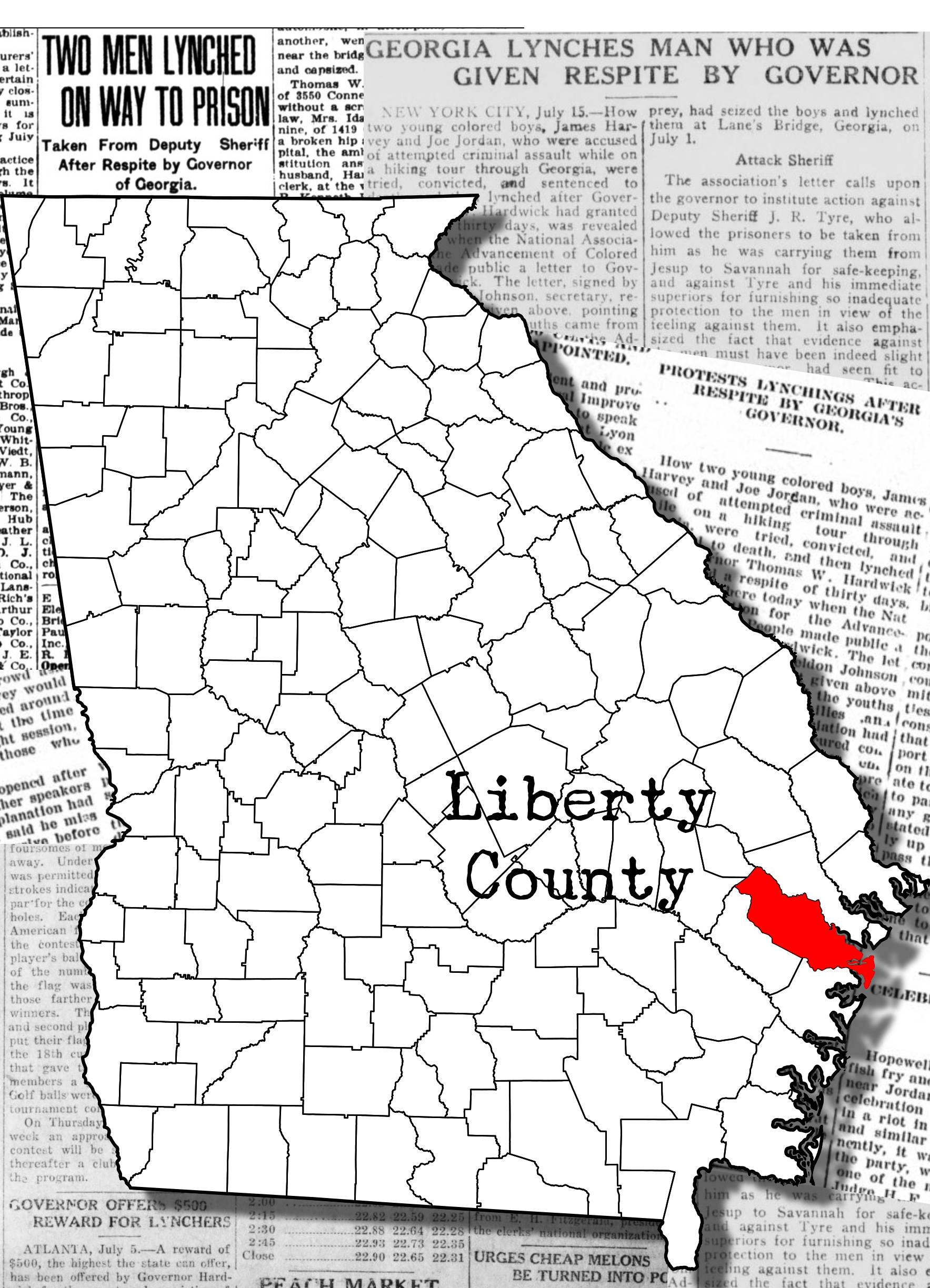
- Date: July 1, 1922
- Location: Liberty County, Georgia
- Participants: A white mob of 50 people lynched in Liberty County, Georgia
- Deaths: 2

James Harvey and Joe Jordan were two African-American men who were lynched on July 1, 1922, in Liberty County, Georgia, United States. They were seized by a mob of about 50 people and hanged while being transported by police from Wayne County to a jail in Savannah. Investigations by the NAACP showed that the police involved were complicit in their abduction by the mob. Twenty-two men were later indicted for the lynching. On February 23, 1923, five defendants, including Chief of Police I.W. Rhoden, were acquitted for the lynching.

== Background ==
During the Summer of 1921, James Harvey and Joe Jordan, after hiking throughout the Deep South, had stopped in Wayne County in southeast Georgia, performing several months of agricultural work. Eventually the two men got into an argument with their white employer regarding their wages, with the employer refusing to pay them for their work. In September, following the quarrel, the employer's wife pressed charges against Harvey and Jordan, alleging that they had attacked and raped her. Three days after the alleged incident, the men were moved to a jail in Savannah and, while incarcerated, were tried in absentia in Wayne County, where they were convicted and sentenced to death. The counsel that had been appointed to defend Harvey and Jordan had made no effort to collect evidence or gather testimony.

Following the trial, Harvey's uncle wrote a letter about the case to the national office of the National Association for the Advancement of Colored People (NAACP), who then requested their Savannah branch to investigate the matter. The NAACP hired James A. Harolds, a white lawyer from Jesup (in Wayne County), to defend Harvey and Jordan and pushed for a retrial, arguing that the men's constitutional rights had been violated and that they had been unable to call witnesses or have any say in the jury selection. A stay of execution was granted as Harolds brought the case before the Supreme Court of Georgia, but the Court reaffirmed the verdict and the men were sentenced to die on May 15, 1922. Following this, several prominent white women in Wayne County petitioned for a new trial, alleging that new evidence had been discovered. Another stay of execution was placed on Harvey and Jordan, but the judge in Wayne County rejected the petition for a new trial and the men were scheduled to be executed on June 30.

Following this, Harvey and Jordan's defense began to petition Georgia Governor Thomas W. Hardwick for executive clemency in their case. On June 30, the scheduled date of the men's execution, the governor granted them a 30-day reprieve. (Note: Sources vary as to the form of this clemency. A 1923 report by the NAACP states that the governor had issued a 30-day respite while the defense sought a pardon, while a 1993 book from historian W. Fitzhugh Brundage states that the governor granted the men a reprieve and sentenced them to life imprisonment.) The Wayne County sheriff replied to the governor's order with, "Your order received with much sorrow."

== Lynching and aftermath ==
While the trials were held in Jesup, Harvey and Jordan were being kept at the jail in Savannah. A day following the governor's clemency, as the men were being escorted from Jesup to Savannah by a deputy sheriff, a group of about 50 men seized Harvey and Jordan while they were in Liberty County and lynched them by hanging them near the side of the road. Immediately after the discovery of the killings, the NAACP wrote to Governor Hardwick about the event, with Hardwick saying he would issue the largest allowable reward for capture of those involved and would instruct the state's solicitor general to present the issue to a grand jury.

The NAACP's Savannah branch also launched an investigation into the lynching, traveling to the scene of the crime, gathering testimonies from witnesses, and collecting evidence. They also ensured that Harvey and Jordan received a proper burial. The Commission on Interracial Cooperation provided some financial assistance for the investigation. According to multiple witnesses interviewed by the NAACP, the two police officers transporting Harvey and Jordan had waited at the scene of the lynching for several hours before the mob arrived, leaving little doubt of their involvement. The event caused outrage among both the black population and prominent local white citizens, as this was the first lynching in coastal Georgia in over twenty years. The reverend of a local Methodist church in Liberty County condemned the lynching during a sermon and sent a widely distributed letter accusing Wayne County officials of complicity in the event. On September 20, a grand jury in Liberty County issued indictments for the Wayne County deputy sheriff, city marshal, and the city marshal's brother, as well as two citizens of Liberty County, in connection with the lynching. In total, 22 men were indicted for the murders. On February 23, 1923, five defendants, including Chief of Police I.W. Rhoden, were acquitted for the lynching.

== See also ==
- False accusations of rape as justification for lynchings

== Bibliography ==
- Brundage, William Fitzhugh (1993). Lynching in the New South: Georgia and Virginia, 1880-1930. University of Illinois Press. ISBN 978-0-252-06345-9 – via Google Books.
- Harris, J. William (2001). Deep Souths: Delta, Piedmont, and Sea Island Society in the Age of Segregation. Johns Hopkins University Press. ISBN 978-0-8018-6563-3 – via Google Books.
- Hughes, Tom (2014). Hanging the Peachtree Bandit: The True Tale of Atlanta's Infamous Frank DuPre. The History Press. ISBN 978-1-62584-946-5 – via Google Books.
- Thirteenth Annual Report of the National Association for the Advancement of Colored People for the year 1922. NAACP. 1923 – via Google Books.

Robertson, Campbell (April 25, 2018). "A Lynching Memorial Is Opening. The Country Has Never Seen Anything Like It". The New York Times.

- Weatherford, Willis Duke (1924). The Negro from Africa to America. George H. Doran Company – via Google Books.
- United States Senate Committee on the Judiciary (1926). "To Prevent and Punish the Crime of Lynching: Hearings Before the United States Senate Committee on the Judiciary, Subcommittee on S. 121, Sixty-Ninth Congress, First Session, on Feb. 16, 1926". United States Government Publishing Office.
