= Cecilia Harvey =

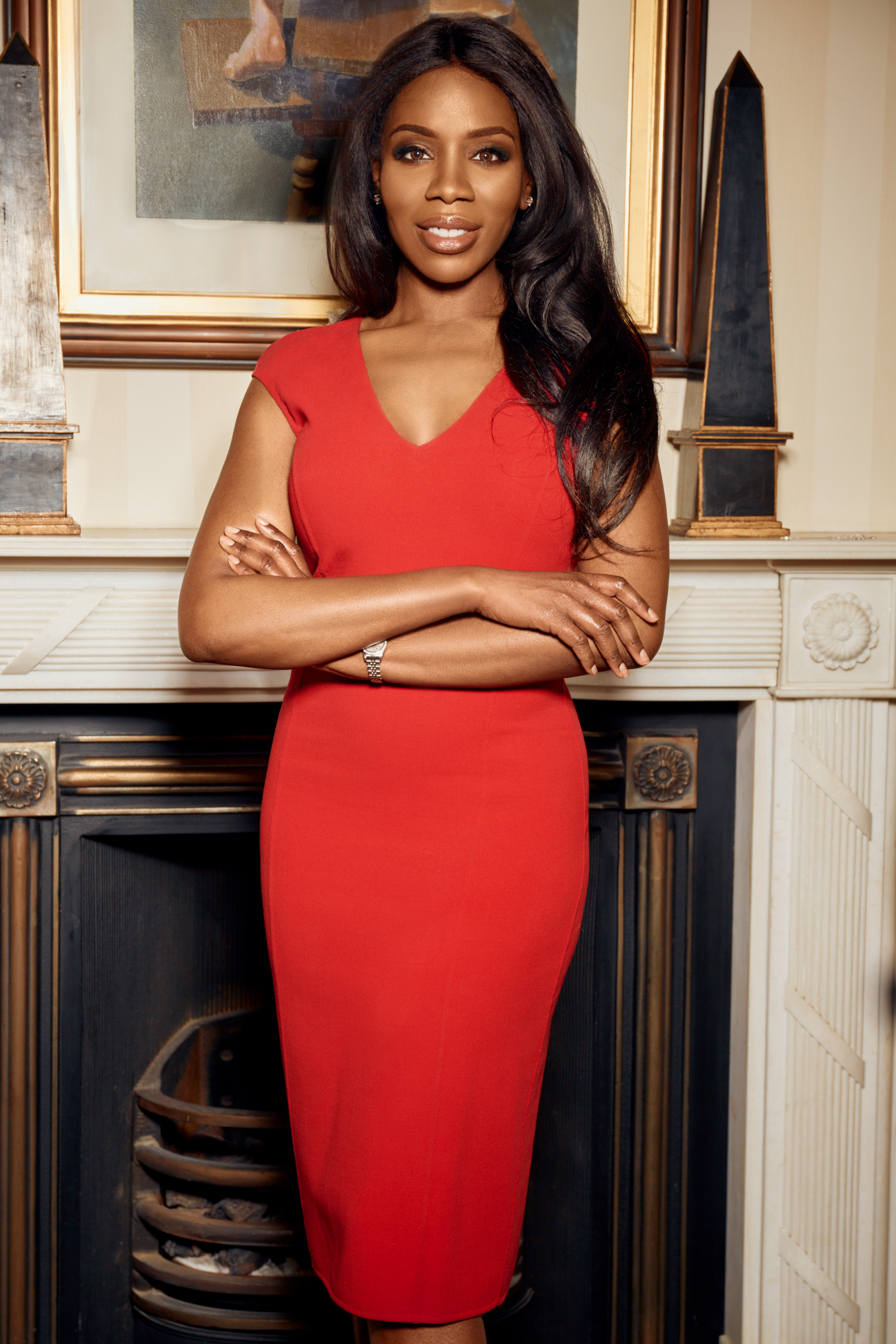
- Born: New York City, New York, U.S.
- Education: Wellesley College
- Occupation: Tech Women Today (founder)
- Known for: Former CEO of Hyve Dynamics; Former COO of City & Guilds
- Awards: See accolades
- Website: www.ceciliaharvey.com

Cecilia Harvey is an American technology executive, author, and entrepreneur. She is the founder and chair of Tech Women Today, a global platform to support women in technology and female entrepreneurs. Harvey served as the CEO of Hyve Dynamics. She served as Chief Operating Officer at City & Guilds, a UK-based skills development organisation. Harvey is recognized for her leadership in technology, her work to increase representation of women and ethnic minorities in the tech sector, and her advocacy for ethical and sustainable innovation practices.

== Early life and education ==
Harvey was born on January 28, 1961, in New York City and raised in Tarrytown, New York. She attended The Ursuline School and graduated with a bachelor's degree in political science from Wellesley College, where she developed an interest in societal impact and ethical governance.

== Career ==
Harvey began her career in the banking and financial services sector, working with major institutions such as Lehman Brothers, Morgan Stanley, Barclays Capital, HSBC, and IBM Consulting.

Harvey has worked in the financial technology industry in various positions, including former Chief Operating Officer of Citigroup Markets and Security Services Technology.

Harvey transitioned to the deep tech sector, co-founding Hyve Dynamics, where she led the development of sensor technologies for applications in gaming, automotive, healthcare, and aerospace industries. Harvey served as Chief Operating Officer at City & Guilds.

== Advocacy and public leadership ==
She founded Tech Women Today, a platform that supports women in technology through networking, mentorship, and professional development opportunities. Tech Women Today is also a resource for non-technical female entrepreneurs who need to leverage technology to grow their business. On the Tech Women Today YouTube Channel Harvey interviews female technology entrepreneurs and shares advice with up-and-coming women in technology.

As a speaker and writer, Harvey frequently addresses issues of responsible technology ethics, including the importance of accountability in artificial intelligence and data privacy.

Harvey has appeared in media outlets such as Marie Claire UK and British Vogue. She was also a keynote speaker at Wired events and at the Global Federation of Competitiveness Councils (GFCC) Global Innovation Summit entitled “Accelerating Global Sustainability and Economic Inclusion” at Queen's University Belfast.

In an episode of The Extra Mile with Edward Enninful, a series by BMW and British Vogue, Harvey discusses her career experiences in technology and business.

She is a vocal proponent of workplace culture reform, addressing issues such as bullying, inequality, and unconscious bias. Harvey conducted research on Queen bee syndrome, a phenomenon in which women in leadership positions may hinder the progress of their female colleagues. She has compared such behavior to "adult versions of the mean girls from school" and identified it as a barrier to workplace diversity. Her findings, published in Development and Learning in Organizations, advocate for fostering supportive workplace cultures and implementing zero-tolerance policies for bullying. Harvey's recommendations for navigating such environments include skill development, network expansion, seeking professional sponsors, and creating non-sexist workplace cultures.

Harvey was also selected as a technology mentor in Bentley Motors’ “Extraordinary Women” programme, part of a UK-based initiative to encourage and support emerging female leaders in STEM fields.

== Publications ==
- Green Machine: A Career Guide For The Young Professional. Virtualbookworm. 2007. ISBN 9781602640474.

Harvey was a regular columnist for Thrive Global, Fairy God Boss, and Entrepreneur Magazine. She moderated "The Forum Network" in London, a platform for executives and entrepreneurs to discuss business and technology trends.

== Accolades ==
- 2025 Named “Inspirational Woman of the Year”, Black Tech Achievement Awards 2025, sponsored by HSBC UK
- 2024 Featured in Computer Weekly's "Most Influential Women in UK Tech" longlist (2022–2024)
- 2024 Finalist for the Everywoman in Technology Awards
- 2021 Keynote speaker at Wired
- 2019 EmPower 100 Ethnic Minority Role Model List
- 2019 Inclusive Tech Alliance Awards Finalist
- 2018 Named in WeAreTechWomen's TechWomen 100
