= Bobby Harvey =

Scottish footballer

Robert Harvey (born 23 May 1955) is a Scottish former footballer who played as a forward. He played for Clyde during the 1970s, making 72 appearances (13 goals) in the Scottish Football League. He had played in an under-18 Schoolboy international for Scotland while a pupil at Holy Cross High School in Hamilton and later played at Junior level for Bellshill Athletic after leaving Clyde.

After retiring from playing, Harvey retained an interest in football. A supporter of Celtic raised in Rutherglen, he had a biography of Bobby Murdoch – from the same town and considered one of its finest sporting products, as well as one of the club's best ever players – published in 2010. Harvey also published a website inviting other residents of the town to nominate 'Rutherglen's Greatest Player' (Murdoch won the vote) and compiled the 15,000 responses in another book published in 2012. He also became a leading volunteer and contributor for the local Football Memories groups (an initiative to use sporting recollections to help combat dementia, a condition which afflicted his mother), and has helped to publicise the sport of walking football in the Glasgow area.
