= John T. Harvey =

American economist

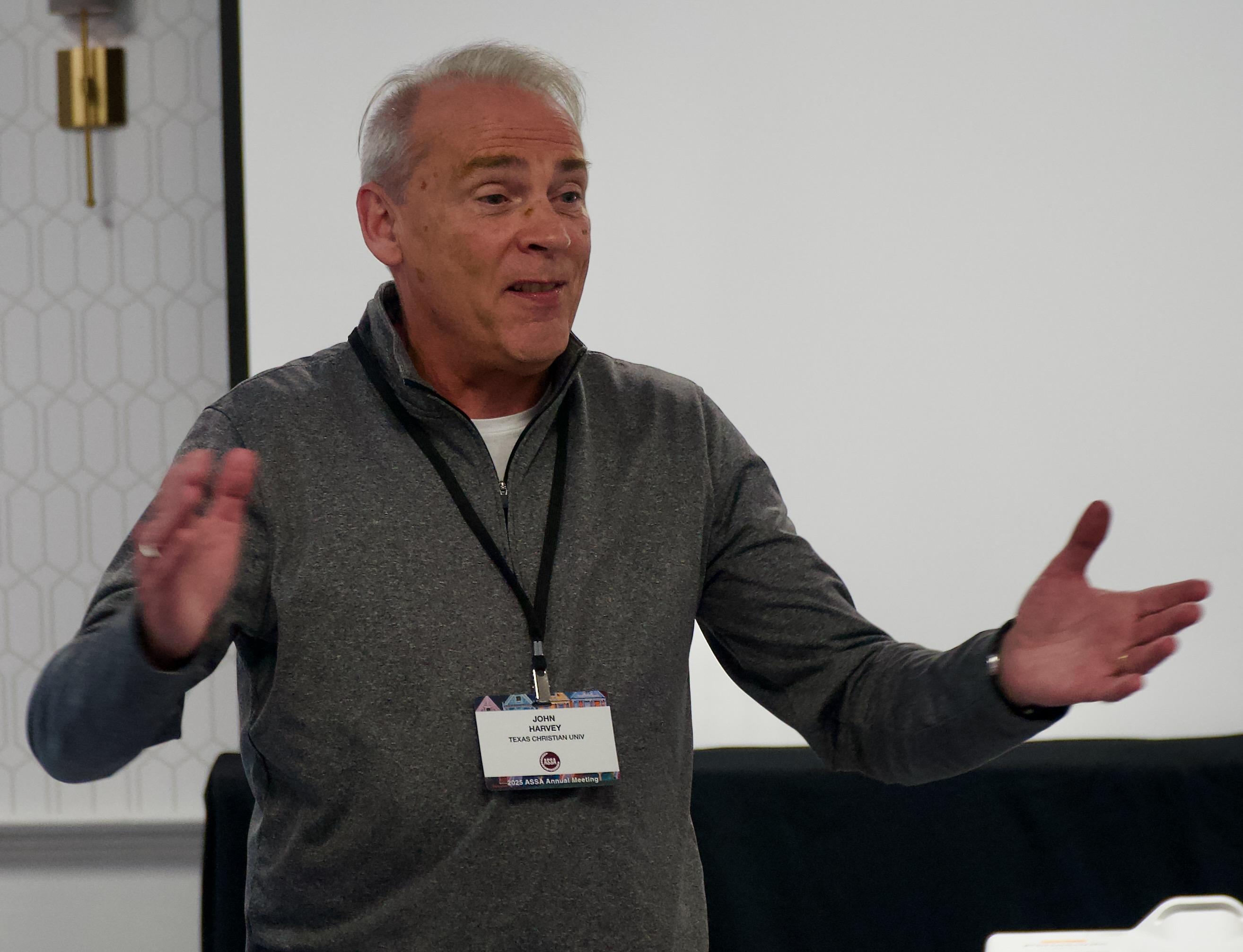
Harvey at AEA 2025

John T. Harvey (born January 20, 1961) is an English-American professor of economics at Texas Christian University. Harvey, a post-Keynesian economist, which is considered a type of heterodox economics, publishes accessible editorials and content to the field's study.

== Early life and education ==
Born in London, England, Harvey attended Knoxville Catholic High School, in Tennessee, in 1979. He completed his undergraduate studies at the neighboring University of Tennessee in a double-major program of economics and political science in 1983. Over the next four years, Harvey finished his graduate work at the same university, acquiring his master's degree and doctorate in economics in 1986 and 1987, respectively.

== Professional life ==
Texas Christian University hired Harvey from the University of Tennessee once he completed his doctorate in 1987. He later became chair of the Department of Economics. His areas of specialty include the history of economics, macroeconomics, and its various contemporary schools of thought.

While serving two professional organizations, Harvey has been a contributor to the economic reports of Forbes since April 2011.

== Books ==
- US Business Cycles 1954-2020: Sources, Symptoms, Solutions, Cambridge University Press, 2025.
- Contending Perspectives in Economics: A Guide to Contemporary Schools of Thought, Edward Elgar, 2015.
- Currencies, Capital Flows, and Crises: A Post Keynesian Analysis of Exchange Rate Determination, Routledge, 2009.
- Future Directions for Heterodox Economics, University of Michigan Press (co-edited with Robert F. Garnett), 2008.
- Foundations of International Economics: A Post Keynesian Analysis, edited by Johan Deprez and John T. Harvey, London: Routledge (1999).

== Personal life ==
During his graduate years, he married Melanie Lynn Barker on August 3, 1985, in Nashville. They have twin daughters. The family owns a pet dog, Coble.

Harvey's leisure activities are playing computer games or reading about the Second World War.
