= James Harvey (artist) =

American artist

James Harvey (1929 – July 15, 1965) was an American commercial and fine artist who was best known as the designer of the Brillo Pad box made famous by pop artist Andy Warhol in 1964 at his "Stable Gallery Show". During his successful career as a commercial artist, Harvey did work for major clients such as Pepsodent, Brillo, Philip Morris and others. Also known as an abstract expressionist painter, he died in 1965.

James Harvey came from a blue-collar, immigrant family. Harvey was born in 1929 in Toronto, Ontario, Canada. His family moved to Detroit before he was a year old. Harvey studied painting at the Art Institute of Chicago. He later returned to Detroit, where he designed window displays for retail giant J. L. Hudson. Finally he moved to New York to break into the art world.

Harvey secured a position in the studio of Egmont Arens, an industrial and packaging designer who helped usher in the “streamlined” style before World War II. In 1963 he redesigned the cigarette packaging, including the familiar geometric designs for Marlboro giant Philip Morris. Harvey and his colleagues worked for two years on sketches, and did 200 final designs. The winner, selected by the executives of Phillip Morris was the most mediocre of the bunch, according to Harvey, who felt “It’s a committee-arrived-at thing,”

In 1959, Egmont Arens fired his creative team. Two of them, Whitney Stuart and William Gunn, took Harvey with them as a freelance designer when they started their own company, called Stuart and Gunn, where Harvey completed the work for Brillo.

In 1964, Andy Warhol launched the Stable Gallery exhibition (known as “the soap-box show”). This was widely regarded as putting Warhol on the map, and critics panned the work. When Harvey saw his design in the gallery, he laughed it off, according to a Print magazine article "Shadow Boxer."

The Graham Gallery, which represented Harvey's abstract expressionist art issued a press release on behalf of Stuart and Gunn (and Harvey) that stated: “It is galling enough for Jim Harvey, an abstract expressionist, to see that a pop artist is running away with the ball, but when the ball happens to be a box designed by Jim Harvey, and Andy Warhol gets the credit for it, well, this makes Jim scream: ‘Andy is running away with my box.’” But the final line practically admitted defeat: “What’s one man’s box, may be another man’s art.”

James Harvey's last show, at Graham in November 1964, presented paintings that were “dynamic, restless, and painted with rich skill,” according to the New York Times. But by July 15, 1965, Harvey was dead in New York's Lenox Hill Hospital. He was reported to have died from cancer of the blood.
