= Edmund Harvey (cricketer) =

English cricketer (1852–1902)

Edmund Harvey (3 November 1852 – 23 February 1902) was an English first-class cricketer active 1872 who played for Middlesex and Cambridge University. He was born in Islington; died in Falmouth, Cornwall.
