= James Harvey (film critic) =

American film critic

James Harvey (August 10, 1929 – April 15, 2020) was an American film critic and writer. His work was published in the New York Review of Books and the Threepenny Review.

== Biography ==
James Harvey was born on 10 August 1929 in Chicago, Illinois. He studied at Loyola University of Chicago and graduated with A.B. in 1951. In 1954, he received an M.A. in politics from the University of Michigan.

During his career, he served as a professor of English at Stony Brook University until 1994. He also taught at the New School and Sarah Lawrence College.

Harvey had died at age 90 of a rare blood disease, as stated by Phillip Lopate, a long time friend.

== Books ==
- Romantic Comedy in Hollywood: From Lubitsch to Sturges (1987)
- Movie Love in the Fifties (2001)
- Watching Them Be: Star Presence on the Screen From Garbo to Balthazar (2014)

== Awards ==
- Hopwood Award
