= Matt T. Harvey =

American journalist

Matt T. Harvey is a New York City-based journalist who frequently contributed to the New York Press. He has written for The New York Observer, the New York Post, and Exiled.com. As well as covering nightlife and the arts, he often focuses on people on the margins of society. He was the first reporter to uncover that the true identity of Poster Boy was Henry Matyjewicz when he interviewed Matyjewicz for the New York Press. In 2010, he appeared on Channel 13's program Metrofocus to discuss one of his NY Press cover features, "Smacktime." He was called a former "Internet microcelebrity" by Gawker's Sheila McClear in 2008. She later went on to focus on him as one of the subjects of her memoir, Last of the Live Nude Girls.
