= Stephen Harvey (cricketer) =

English cricketer (born 1964)

Personal information
- Full name: Stephen Robert Harvey
- Born: 12 July 1964 (age 62); Little Snoring, Norfolk, England
- Batting: Left-handed

Domestic team information
- Years: Team
- 1993–1995: Norfolk

Career statistics
Competition	List A
Matches	1
Runs scored	39
Batting average	39.00
100s/50s	–/–
Top score	39
Balls bowled	–
Wickets	–
Bowling average	–
5 wickets in innings	–
10 wickets in match	–
Best bowling	–
Catches/stumpings	–/–
- Source: Cricinfo, 28 June 2011

Stephen Robert Harvey (born 28 July 1964) is a former English cricketer. Harvey was a left-handed batsman. He was born in Little Snoring, Norfolk.

Harvey made his debut for Norfolk in the 1993 Minor Counties Championship against Cambridgeshire. Harvey played Minor counties cricket for Norfolk from 1993 to 1995, which included 5 Minor Counties Championship matches and a single MCCA Knockout Trophy match. He made his only List A appearance against Lancashire in the 1995 NatWest Trophy. In this match, he scored 39 runs before being dismissed by Mike Watkinson.
