= James B. Harvey =

Air Vice-Marshal James B. Harvey

International Commissioner of Scouts Canada

James B. Harvey served as the International Commissioner of Scouts Canada. In 1974, Harvey was awarded the 86th Bronze Wolf, the only distinction of the World Organization of the Scout Movement, awarded by the World Scout Committee for exceptional services to world Scouting.

== Background ==
Prior to working the Scouts, Harvey had been an Air Vice-Marshal in Canada.
