= Ronald Harvey (cricketer) =

English cricketer

Personal information
- Full name: Ronald Charles Harvey
- Born: 7 May 1934 (age 92); Ingatestone, Essex, England
- Batting: Left-handed
- Bowling: Right-arm fast-medium

Domestic team information
- Years: Team
- 1952: Essex

Career statistics
Competition	First-class
Matches	1
Runs scored	12
Batting average	–
100s/50s	0/0
Top score	12*
Balls bowled	96
Wickets	3
Bowling average	29.33
5 wickets in innings	0
10 wickets in match	0
Best bowling	3/88
Catches/stumpings	0/–
- Source: Cricinfo, 24 October 2011

Ronald Charles Harvey (born 7 May 1934) is a former English cricketer. Harvey was a left-handed batsman who bowled right-arm fast-medium. He was born at Ingatestone, Essex.

Harvey made his only first-class appearance for Essex against T. N. Pearce's XI in 1952. In this match he took three wickets in T. N. Pearce's XI's first-innings, taking the wickets of Neville Rogers, Maurice Tompkin and Peter Smith for the cost of 88 runs from 16 overs. Essex made just 205 in response to T. N. Pearce's XI's first-innings score of 389, with Harvey batting at number eleven ended unbeaten on 12. Essex were forced to follow-on in their second-innings and were dismissed for 159, with Harvey ending not out on zero. Essex lost the match by an innings and 25 runs.
