= James Harvey (footballer) =

English footballer

Personal information
- Date of birth: 7 August 1911
- Place of birth: York, England
- Position: Goalkeeper

Senior career*
Years	Team	Apps	(Gls)
1930–1931	Sheffield Wednesday	0	(0)
1931	Wombwell		(0)
1931	Frickley Colliery		
1931	Rotherham United	0	(0)
1932	Frickley Colliery		
1932–1933	Bristol Rovers	1	(0)
1933–1934	Frickley Colliery		
1934–193?	Gillingham	17	
1938	Denaby United		
- * Club domestic league appearances and goals

James D. Harvey (7 August 1911 – after 1938) was an English professional footballer who played as a goalkeeper. He played in the Football League for Bristol Rovers and Gillingham.

== Playing career ==
Harvey was born in York and began his senior football career with Sheffield Wednesday then moved to Rotherham United before dropping down to the Midland League with Frickley Colliery. He then moved to Bristol Rovers before a return to Frickley, where he was convicted of obtaining money by deception, before moving to Gillingham where he made 17 first team appearances.
