= Peter Harvey (cricketer, born 1923) =

English cricketer

Personal information
- Full name: Peter Fairfield Harvey
- Born: 15 January 1923; Linby, Nottinghamshire, England
- Died: 19 July 2006 (aged 83); Oadby, Leicestershire, England
- Batting: Right-handed
- Bowling: Right-arm leg-spin

Domestic team information
- Years: Team
- 1947–1958: Nottinghamshire

Career statistics
Competition	First-class
Matches	175
Runs scored	3645
Batting average	18.40
100s/50s	2/9
Top score	150
Balls bowled	26,411
Wickets	335
Bowling average	35.54
5 wickets in innings	13
10 wickets in match	3
Best bowling	8/122
Catches/stumpings	116/0
- Source: Cricinfo, 25 August 2022

Peter Fairfield Harvey (15 January 1923 – 19 July 2006) was an English cricketer who played first-class cricket for Nottinghamshire from 1947 to 1958.

== Life and career ==
Harvey was a leg spin bowler, a right-handed batsman and a fine fieldsman. In the early stages of his career he was considered one of the best young players in England. In 1949 Learie Constantine wrote of him: "His big leg-breaks are most difficult to deal with, and put even batsmen like Compton and Edrich on the defensive. He is still young enough to have a good Test career. He is a steady and promising batsman, and definitely a brilliant fieldsman, one of the best in England."

Harvey's best match figures were 11 for 202 against Derbyshire in August 1949, and his best innings figures were 8 for 122 against Somerset a few days later. His most successful season was 1951, when he took 73 wickets and scored 784 runs, including a career-best 150 in six and a half hours against Leicestershire. However, the arrival of the leg-spinners Bruce Dooland and Gamini Goonesena at Nottinghamshire in 1953 relegated Harvey to the Second XI with occasional matches for the first team. Playing for the Second XI in the Minor Counties Championship in 1956 he was the leading wicket-taker in the competition, with 64 wickets at an average of 14.78; he also scored 449 runs at an average of 44.90.

During his playing days, Harvey was employed in the winter by Redmayne and Todd, a sports outfitters in Nottingham. When he retired from cricket he was appointed manager of the Leicester branch of the firm, and he stayed with Redmayne and Todd until he retired.
