= Stephen Harvey (author) =

Stephen Harvey (December 24, 1949 – January 1, 1993) was an author, film critic, and associate curator of film at the Museum of Modern Art. His book, Directed by Vincente Minnelli, is "widely considered the definitive study of Mr. Minnelli and the MGM studio system of his time.”

After joining the Museum of Modern Art in 1972, Harvey organized retrospectives on major figures in the motion picture industry. He contributed essays to many publications, including The New York Times, Premiere, The Nation, and Film Comment. He was film critic for Inquiry and theater critic for Soho News. He was a member of the National Society of Film Critics. The French government named him a chevalier in the Ordre des Arts et des Lettres in 1985.

Harvey died January 1, 1993, at age 43, from pneumonia and other AIDS complications.
