= Michael Harvey (author) =

American journalist

Michael Harvey is an American author, journalist, and documentary filmmaker.

== Career ==
Harvey is the author of seven crime novels, The Chicago Way, The Fifth Floor, The Third Rail, We All Fall Down, The Innocence Game, The Governor's Wife, and Brighton. Harvey is also an investigative reporter, documentary producer and co-creator, producer and executive producer of A&E's groundbreaking forensic series, Cold Case Files. Harvey's investigative journalism and documentary work has won multiple news Emmys and CableACE awards, numerous national and international film festival awards, a CINE Golden Eagle, two Prime-Time Emmy nominations, as well as an Academy Award nomination. Harvey was also selected by the Chicago Tribune as Chicagoan of the Year in Literature for 2011.

Harvey graduated from the College of the Holy Cross with a Bachelor of Arts, magna cum laude, in classics. He then earned a Juris Doctor with honors from Duke University and a Master of Science in journalism from Northwestern University. Harvey is currently an adjunct professor at Northwestern's Medill School of Journalism. Harvey was born in Boston, graduated from Boston Latin and lives in Chicago. He owns an Irish bar in Chicago, The Hidden Shamrock.

== Books ==
P.I Michael Kelly series:

- The Governor’s Wife, Knopf, 2015.
- We All Fall Down, Knopf, 2011.
- The Third Rail, Knopf, 2010.
- The Fifth Floor, Knopf, 2008.
- The Chicago Way, Knopf, 2007.

stand-alone:

- Pulse, Ecco, 2018.
- Brighton, Ecco, 2016.
- The Innocence Game, Knopf, 2013.

== Awards ==
- Chicago Tribune 2011 Person of the Year – Literature.
- Two Primetime Emmy Nominations for Best Original Non-Fiction Series
- Academy Award Nomination – Best Short Feature Documentary
- Columbus International Film Festival Chris Award
- CINE – Golden Eagle Award
- Houston World Film Festival – Gold Medal
- New York Festivals – Gold Medal
- National CableACE Award – Best News Special
- New York Festivals – World Medal, International Division
- National CableACE Award – Best News Special
- Regional Emmy Award – Best Feature Series
- Columbus International Film Festival Bronze Plaque
- New York Festivals Gold Medal
- Five Regional Emmy Awards
- National Easter Seal Award, Best Feature
