= Thomas Harvey (16th-century MP) =

English politician

Thomas Harvey (by 1512 – 1577 or later) was an English politician.

He was the son of Nicholas Harvey (d. 1532) by his first wife Elizabeth. William FitzWilliam, 1st Earl of Southampton was his maternal uncle. In 1638 Nicholas Bourbon (the elder), who had been one of his tutor's, praised him for his fluency in classical and modern languages.

He was elected as Member (MP) of the Parliament of England for New Shoreham in March 1553, through the influence of his cousin Sir Anthony Browne, who was the sheriff of Surrey and Sussex. In October 1553 he was elected for Orford, presumably as a result of his family's links to the county. His subsequent election to sit for Midhurst in November 1554 and in 1558 were again due to the influence of Sir Anthony Browne, who was patron of the seat. He was appointed Knight Marshal in March 1558.

Following the accession of Elizabeth I he left England and used his language skills in the service of Philip II, Don Juan of Austria and the Duke and Duchess of Feria. In 1577 he was arrested on the orders of the States General of the Netherlands and probably died in prison.

A portrait of Harvey was included in the catalogue of paintings at Abbotsford in 1888.
