= Nick Harvey (cricketer) =

English cricketer

Nick Harvey (born 21 November 1973) was an English cricketer. He was a right-handed batsman and wicket-keeper who played for Berkshire. He was born in Ascot.

Harvey, who made his cricketing debut in 1991 for the National Association of Young Cricketers, and who also played for Marylebone Cricket Club Schools, made his Minor Counties Championship debut in 1993, and played several games for Essex and Lancashire Second XI's.

Harvey made a single List A appearance for Berkshire, in the 2001 C&G Trophy. He took two catches and one stumping in the match, and scored 7 runs with the bat.
