= A. D. Harvey =

English historian, novelist and hoaxer (born 1947)

- Born: 1947 (age 78–79); Colchester, England
- Other names: Stephanie Harvey, Stephen Harvey, Graham Headley, Trevor McGovern, John Schellenberger, Leo Bellingham, Michael Lindsay, Ludovico Parra, and Janis Blodnieks
- Education: St John's College, Oxford; Wolfson College, Cambridge
- Occupations: Historian and novelist
- Known for: Literary hoaxes

Arnold D. Harvey (born 1947) is an English historian, novelist and hoaxer. He originated a hoax claiming that Charles Dickens met Fyodor Dostoyevsky, and has published work under a variety of other names, including Stephanie Harvey, Stephen Harvey, Graham Headley, Trevor McGovern, John Schellenberger, Leo Bellingham, Michael Lindsay, Ludovico Parra, and Janis Blodnieks.

== Early life and education ==
A. D. Harvey was born and brought up in Colchester, where he attended Colchester Royal Grammar School. He read Modern History under Sir Keith Thomas at St John's College, Oxford, and obtained his Ph.D. in History at Cambridge only six years after sitting his GCE A-levels, being a member of University College, now Wolfson College.

In a letter to The London Review of Books, he stated that "practically everyone [he] met while an undergraduate 1966–69" was "bored, frustrated and above all disillusioned by an Oxford that was so much more mundane than their school daydreams". His first novel, Oxford: The Novel, published in 1981 under the pseudonym "Leo Bellingham" by his own imprint, Nold Jonson Books, fictionalises his time as an undergraduate. It is peppered with erotically-charged scenes and attacks on the Oxford student left, and voices frustration at the condescending manner in which students of a privileged background treat the more humbly born ("He seemed forever to be doing the wrong thing in Oxford – grammar school boy, hey? Doesn't know how to behave." "Wrong background, wrong accent, wrong everything. It was like digging a trench with nail scissors, trying to be a social success at Oxford.").

== Academic career ==
Harvey has taught at the universities of Cambridge, Salerno, La Réunion and Leipzig. He has written several academic monographs dealing with different aspects of English cultural, social and military history. Kathryn Hughes called him "a master of the concrete, the adroit displayer of the precious scrap of hard fact". At times, Harvey's works have been described by reviewers as somewhat encyclopaedic and lacking in analysis, although Andrew Roberts in The Times wrote of his "academically immaculate analyses". Harvey was editor of the journal Salisbury Review from 2000 to 2002. He has also contributed to History Today and BBC History Magazine on subjects including Napoleon, the boroughs of London, Gustav III of Sweden, Engelbert Dollfuss, Churchill on Rollerskates and the Stuka divebomber. He has made contributions to specialist journals on aspects of air warfare.

Harvey has published under many pseudonyms and in 2013 he was identified as the author of a 2002 article attributed to a "Stephanie Harvey" falsely claiming that Charles Dickens and Fyodor Dostoevsky met in 1862. The account of this meeting and the supposed insight into Dickens's character and literary motivations revealed in a wholly fictitious letter by Dostoevsky was subsequently quoted in a number of scholarly articles and books, including major biographies of Dickens. The hoax, along with Harvey's record of pseudonymous publications and falsified citations, was exposed in April 2013 in an article in The Times Literary Supplement by Eric Naiman, Professor of Comparative Literature & Department Chair of Slavic Languages and Literatures at University of California, Berkeley; Naiman also noted that Harvey has been blacklisted from the journal History.

== Literary career ==
Besides Oxford: The Novel, Harvey has published another novel, Warriors of the Rainbow, a work of science fiction about a reanimated woman and her lover, set in a world controlled by a shadowy cadre of whales. It was described by The Guardian as "weirdly compelling" and by The Independent as "free flowing and poetic". He is also a published poet (Sonnets, 2006) and a prolific letter writer to the literary journals of the United Kingdom.

== Select bibliography ==
- Britain in the Early Nineteenth Century (1978)
- English Poetry in a Changing Society, 1780–1825 (1980)
- Mind-Sprung (1981)
- Oxford: The Novel (1981)
- Literature into History (1988)
- Collision of Empires: Britain in Three World Wars, 1793–1945 (1992, revised edition 1994)
- Sex in Georgian England: Attitudes and Prejudices from the 1720s to the 1820s (1994. revised edition 2001)
- A Muse of Fire: Literature, Art and War (1998)
- Warriors of the Rainbow (2000)
- Arnhem (2001)
- Body Politic: Political Metaphor and Political Violence (2007)
- Testament of War: Literature, Art and the First World War (2018)
- Side Stories (2020)
- Dezzie and the Historian (2022)
