= Nicholas Harvey (MP for Huntingdonshire) =

Member of the Parliament of England

Nicholas Harvey/Hervey (by 1491 – 1532), of Ickworth, Suffolk, was a Tudor courtier and member of parliament.

He was a younger son of William Harvey of Ickworth and Joan, daughter of John Cokett of Ampton, Suffolk. By 1512 he was married to Elizabeth, daughter of Sir Thomas Fitzwilliam of Aldwark, Ecclesfield, Yorkshire and Lucy, daughter of John Neville, 1st Marquess of Montagu. Elizabeth was the widow of Sir Thomas Mauleverer.

He joined Henry VIII's household and in 1520 was chosen as one of the jousters at the Field of the Cloth of Gold. In 1522 he joined the garrison at Berwick-upon-Tweed, where he experienced real warfare against the Scots. Shortly after the death of her first husband Sir Richard Wingfield in 1525 he married Bridget Wiltshire. He was one of the jousters at the entertainment of the French ambassadors in 1527.

He sat as Member of Parliament for Huntingdonshire in 1529. A supporter of Anne Boleyn in June 1630 he was sent as ambassador to Ghent. He remained in Ghent until the following spring, when he was probably recalled in order to support the king in parliament. He died in August 1532 and was buried at Ampthill, Bedfordshire. As Catherine of Aragon was then living at Amptill and the king was there in July 1532, it is likely that he was there in the king's service.

He was succeeded by his son by his first wife Thomas.
