= Thomas H. Harvey Jr. =

American Army general

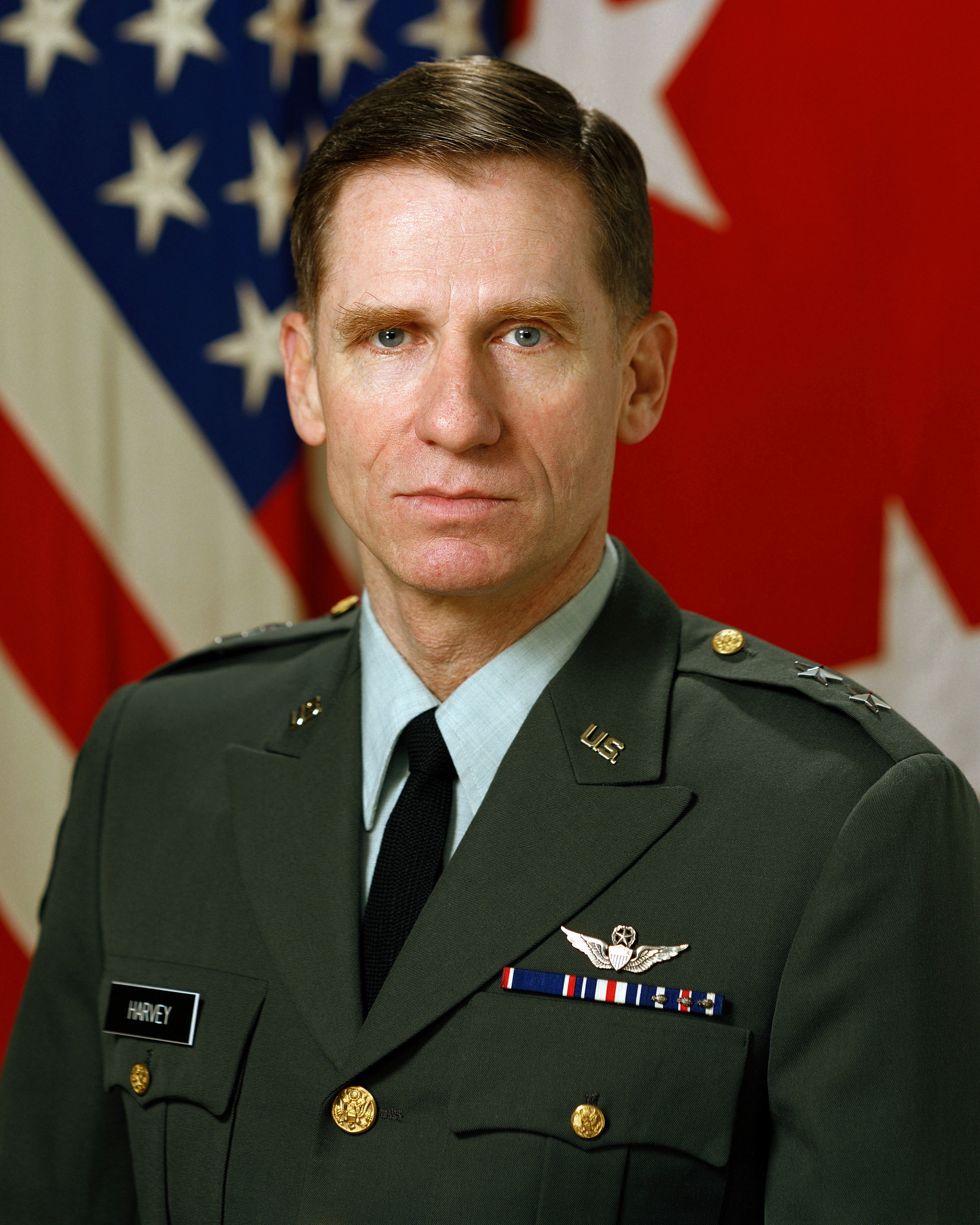
- Born: September 15, 1936; Fort Hancock, New Jersey, US
- Died: November 8, 2013 (aged 77); Enterprise, Alabama, US
- Military career
- Allegiance: United States
- Branch: United States Army
- Service years: 1958–1991
- Rank: Major General
- Nickname: Mike
- Commands: 9th Cavalry Brigade; 3rd Squadron, 4th Cavalry Regiment
- Conflicts: Vietnam War
- Awards: Distinguished Service Cross; Silver Star Medal; Defense Superior Service Medal; Legion of Merit; Distinguished Flying Cross (4); Bronze Star Medal (2); Purple Heart; Air Medal (53)

Thomas Henry "Mike" Harvey Jr. (September 15, 1936 – November 8, 2013) was a major general in the United States Army. He was awarded the Distinguished Service Cross for his actions in Vietnam in 1967.

== Early life and education ==
Born into an Army family at Fort Hancock in Middletown Township, New Jersey, Harvey attended the Phillips Academy in Andover, Massachusetts, where he played ice hockey, lacrosse and football. He was captain of the hockey team in his senior year and graduated in 1954. Harvey was then appointed to the United States Military Academy, where he again played ice hockey and lacrosse. In 1958, he was a starter on Army's national champion lacrosse team and graduated with a B.S. degree in military science. Harvey attended Army Aviation School at Fort Rucker in Alabama from 1960 to 1961. He later earned an M.S. degree in political science from Kansas State University.

== Military career ==
Harvey served three combat tours in Vietnam. During his second tour, he earned the Distinguished Service Cross for his actions on 16 April 1967 as a platoon leader with Troop B, 1st Squadron, 9th Cavalry, 1st Cavalry Division (Airmobile). Flying reconnaissance and air support for infantry ground operations near Đức Phổ, he supplied rocket and machine gun fire until his helicopter was damaged and low on fuel. Returning to base for a fresh helicopter, he rejoined the action until his second helicopter was damaged and one of his crew members was wounded. Returning to base to evacuate the wounded soldier, he again rejoined the action in a third helicopter.

For his service in Vietnam, Harvey also received the Silver Star Medal, four Distinguished Flying Crosses, two Bronze Star Medals, the Purple Heart and 53 Air Medals.

As a lieutenant colonel, Harvey served as commander of the 3rd Squadron, 4th Cavalry, 25th Infantry Division in Hawaii. As a colonel, he served as commander of the 9th Cavalry Brigade (Air Attack) at Fort Lewis in Washington State.

Harvey's promotion to brigadier general was approved on 4 October 1984. He served as assistant commander of the 2nd Infantry Division.

Harvey's promotion to major general was approved on 1 July 1987. He retired from active duty in 1991.

In addition to his combat awards, Harvey received the Defense Superior Service Medal, Defense Meritorious Service Medal and three Army Meritorious Service Medals.

== Personal ==
Harvey was the son of Thomas Henry Harvey Sr. (17 August 1907 – 13 December 1980). His father was a 1932 graduate of the U.S. Military Academy who retired from active duty in 1962 as a colonel.

Harvey's own son Thomas Henry "Todd" Harvey III also attended the Phillips Academy and served five years in the Army as a paratrooper and aviator. He then became a civilian employee of the U.S. Department of Defense.

After his retirement, Harvey Jr. settled in El Paso, Texas. After about five years, he relocated to Enterprise, Alabama.

After his death in Enterprise, he was buried at Arlington National Cemetery on 24 April 2014.
