= Jim Harvey (American football) =

American football player (1943–2017)

No. 70
- Positions: Guard, Tackle

Personal information
- Born: August 20, 1943; Jackson, Mississippi, U.S.
- Died: September 27, 2017 (aged 74)
- Listed height: 6 ft 5 in (1.96 m)
- Listed weight: 255 lb (116 kg)

Career information
- High school: Forest (Forest, Mississippi)
- College: Ole Miss (1962-1965)
- NFL draft: 1965: 5th round, 59th overall pick
- AFL draft: 1965: Red Shirt 2nd round, 9th overall pick

Career history
- Oakland Raiders (1966-1971)

Awards and highlights
- AFL champion (1967); Second-team All-SEC (1965)

Career NFL/AFL statistics
- Games played: 78
- Games started: 52
- Stats at Pro Football Reference

James Britton Harvey Jr. (August 20, 1943 – September 27, 2017) was an American professional football player who played guard for six seasons for the Oakland Raiders.

Harvey died after a fall at home on September 27, 2017, at the age of 74.
