= Matt Harvey (poet) =

British humourist and performance poet

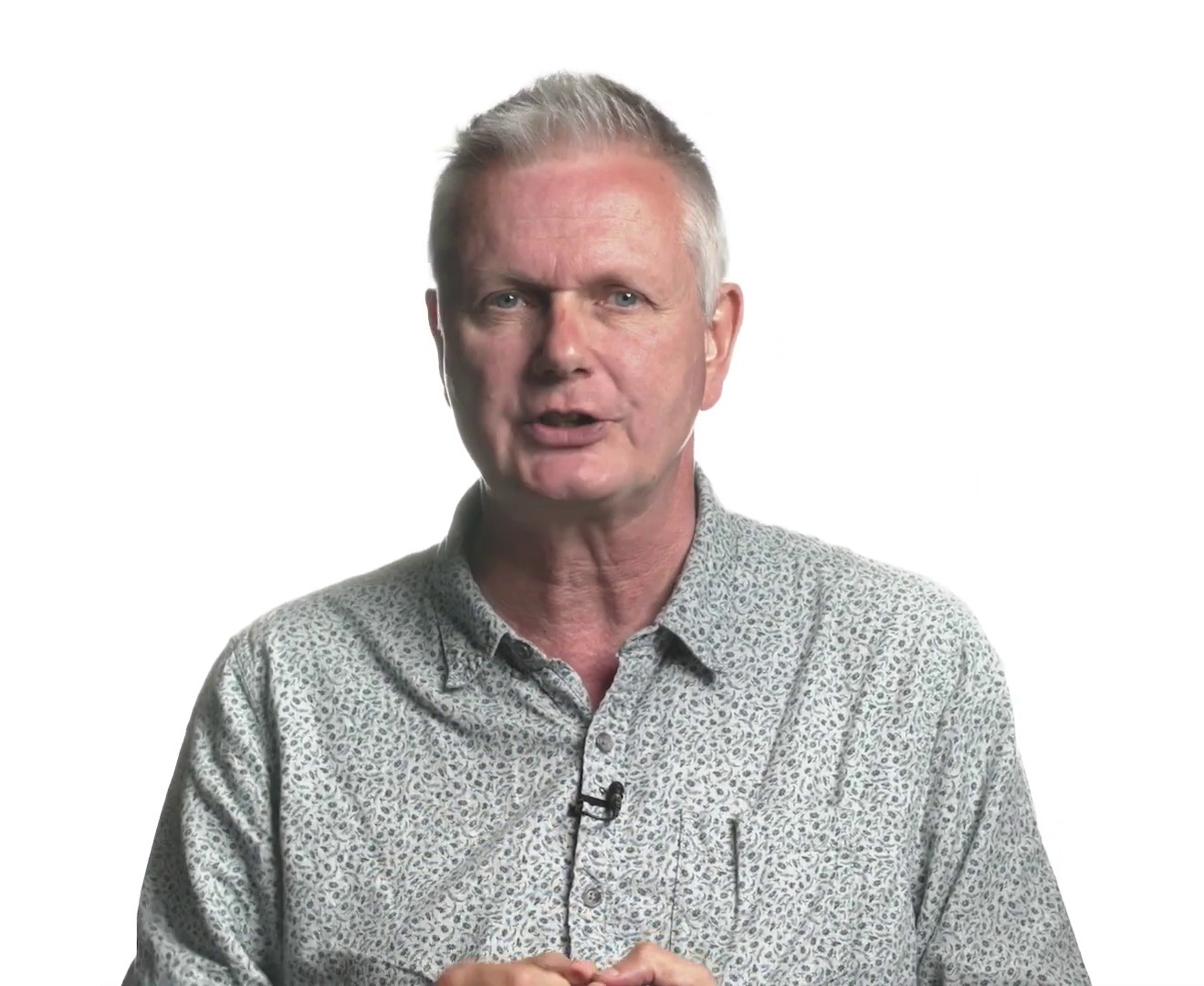
Matt Harvey

Matt Harvey is a British humourist and performance poet who has published a number of books and makes regular contributions to radio broadcasts.

In his youth he moved around Britain, staying in Cheshire, Scotland and Ireland; he settled in Twickenham, London aged 15. As a teenager he was influenced by the Mersey Poets, including Adrian Henri, Roger McGough and Brian Patten. He had a troubled childhood before in his early 20s attending the Self Heal Association, a psychotherapeutic centre in Devon. He later became a helper at the centre and continues to speak and perform at mental health conferences.

He began his career as a performer in 1992, giving live performances to audiences in the South West of England. He has since performed across the country at conferences, cabarets, colleges and literary festivals. He is the President of the Exeter and East Devon branch of the charity Mind, and lives in Totnes.

Harvey was appointed Official Wimbledon Championship Poet 2010. The job entailed coming out with a poem each day of the championship to entertain the spectators. The poems would also be available online and in podcast.

== Publications ==
- Here We Are Then
- Songs Sung Sideways
- Standing Up To Be Counted Out
- Curtains and Other Material
- The Hole In The Sum Of My Parts
- Where Earwigs Dare
- Mindless Body Spineless Mind
- The Element in the Room
