= Peter Harvey (writer) =

American merchant (1798–1877)

- Born: October 17, 1798; Tazewell County, Virginia, US
- Died: July 12, 1877 (aged 78); Boston, Massachusetts, US
- Occupation: Writer
- Writing career
- Notable works: Reminiscences and anecdotes of Daniel Webster

Peter Harvey (October 17, 1798 – July 12, 1877) was an American merchant and author contemporary of Daniel Webster. He was known as Webster's closest friend and confidant. Harvey is known for the book that he authored about the life of Webster.

== Published works ==
- Harvey, Peter and Towle, George Makepeace. Reminiscences and anecdotes of Daniel Webster, Little, Brown, and Company, 1877.
