= Peter Harvey (cricketer, born 1926) =

English cricketer

Personal information
- Full name: Peter Vernon Harvey
- Born: 6 January 1926; Wallington, Surrey, England
- Died: 27 October 1966 (aged 40); Taunton, Somerset, England
- Batting: Left-handed

Domestic team information
- Years: Team
- 1949: Oxford University

Career statistics
| Competition | First-class |
|---|---|
| Matches | 1 |
| Runs scored | 9 |
| Batting average | 9.00 |
| 100s/50s | –/– |
| Top score | 9 |
| Balls bowled | – |
| Wickets | – |
| Bowling average | – |
| 5 wickets in innings | – |
| 10 wickets in match | – |
| Best bowling | – |
| Catches/stumpings | –/– |
- Source: Cricinfo, 13 November 2011

Peter Vernon Harvey (6 January 1926 – 27 October 1966) was an English cricketer. Harvey was a left-handed batsman. He was born at Wallington, Surrey.

While studying at University College, Oxford, Harvey made a single first-class appearance for Oxford University Cricket Club against the Free Foresters in 1949. In this match, he was dismissed for 9 runs in the university's only innings by Rowland Shaddick, with Oxford University winning by an innings and 17 runs.

He died on 27 October 1966 just outside Taunton, Somerset.
