= Tom Harvey (cricketer) =

English cricketer (born 1980)

Personal information
- Full name: Thomas Frederick Charles Harvey
- Born: 4 February 1980 (age 46); Chatham, Kent, England
- Batting: Left-handed
- Bowling: Right-arm off break

Domestic team information
- Years: Team
- 2002: Kent Cricket Board
- 2004: Cambridge UCCE
- 2004–2010: Cambridgeshire

Career statistics
Competition	First-class
Matches	1
Runs scored	21
Batting average	21.00
100s/50s	–/–
Top score	21
Balls bowled	222
Wickets	4
Bowling average	27.50
5 wickets in innings	–
10 wickets in match	–
Best bowling	3/43
Catches/stumpings	–/–
- Source: Cricinfo, 20 July 2019

Thomas Frederick Charles Harvey (born 4 February 1980) is an English former first-class cricketer.

Harvey was born in February 1980 at Chatham, Kent. He played for the Kent Cricket Board in the 2002 MCCA Knockout Trophy. While studying at university in Cambridge, Harvey made a single appearance in first-class cricket for Cambridge UCCE against Middlesex at Fenner's in 2004. He took four wickets in the match with his right-arm off break bowling, while with the bat he was dismissed by Ed Joyce in the Cambridge UCCE first-innings for 21 runs. He also played minor counties cricket for Cambridgeshire from 2004–10, making nineteen appearances in the Minor Counties Championship and thirteen appearances in the MCCA Knockout Trophy.
