= Stephen Harvey (biologist) =

Stephen C. Harvey (born 1940) is an American structural biologist with research interest in nucleic acids, the ribosome, virus structure and high density lipoprotein. He is currently an adjunct professor in the Department of Biochemistry and Biophysics at the University of Pennsylvania and professor emeritus and Georgia Research Alliance eminent scholar emeritus in the School of Biology at the Georgia Institute of Technology, Atlanta, Georgia. Harvey did his undergraduate work at the University of California (Berkeley), where he received his A.B. degree in physics. In the 1960s, he worked as a rocket test engineer on the Apollo program (the lunar mission project) and served with the Peace Corps in Colombia, before entering graduate school in physics at Dartmouth College, where he received his PhD in biophysics in 1971. Before moving to Georgia Tech in 2003, Harvey was professor in the Department of Biochemistry and Molecular Genetics at the University of Alabama at Birmingham (UAB).

He is past president of the Biophysical Society and co-author, with J. Andrew McCammon, of the classic book on Molecular Dynamics, Dynamics of Proteins and Nucleic Acids (Cambridge University Press, 1987; ISBN 9780521356527). Harvey is married to the artist Marie Weaver. They live in Philadelphia, Pennsylvania.

The Marie Weaver and Steve Harvey Endowed Scholarship Fund for Graphic Design was set up in 2003 by the University of Alabama at Birmingham in honor of associate professor of graphic design Marie Weaver and her husband, professor of Biochemistry and Molecular Genetics Steve Harvey for their strong support of the arts at UAB.

== Selected publications ==
- J. A. McCammon and S. C. Harvey, Dynamics of Proteins and Nucleic Acids (Cambridge University Press, London, 1987).
- S. C. Harvey, "The Scrunchworm Hypothesis: Transitions Between A-DNA and B-DNA Provide the Driving Force for Genome Packaging in Double-Stranded DNA Bacteriophages," J Struct Biol 189:1–8 (2015).
- M. R. Smyda and S. C. Harvey, "The Entropic Cost of Polymer Confinement," J Phys Chem B 116, 10928–10934 (2012).
- S. C. Harvey, A. S. Petrov, B. Devkota and M. B. Boz, "Computational Approaches to Modeling Viral Structure and Assembly," Methods Enzymol 487, 513–543 (2011).
- A. S. Petrov and S. C. Harvey, "Packaging Double-Helical DNA into Viral Capsids: Structures, Forces and Energetics," Biophys J 95, 497–502 (2008).
- J. A. Mears, M. R. Sharma, R. R. Gutell, A. S. McCook, P. E. Richardson, T. R. Caulfield, R. K. Agrawal and S. C. Harvey, "A Structural Model of the Mitochondrial Ribosome," J. Mol. Biol. 358, 193–212 (2006).
- J. P. Segrest, M. K. Jones, A. E. Klon, C. J. Sheldahl and S. C. Harvey, "Apolipoprotein A-I in Discoidal High Density Lipoprotein: A Detailed Molecular Belt Model," J. Biol. Chem. 274, 31755–31758 (1999).
