= Michael C. Harvey =

American inventor

Michael C. Harvey (also known as M. C. Harney or M. C. Harvey) was an American inventor. He is known for inventing an improvement in the wick-raiser of the lantern. The original lantern with the wick-raiser improvements is now on display at the Black History Museum. He received patent No. 303844 on August 19, 1884, in St. Louis, Missouri for the invention of an improvement in wick-raisers.
