= Shawn Harvey (singer-songwriter) =

- Born: 2 September 1971 (age 54)
- Origin: Plymouth, Devon, England
- Genres: Rockabilly, blues, country
- Occupation: Singer-songwriter
- Instruments: Vocals, guitar
- Years active: 1995–present
- Label: Kissy Music
- Website: https://shawnharvey.com/

Shawn Harvey (born 2 September 1971) is an English singer, songwriter, guitarist, multi-instrumentalist and record producer. Harvey, who has gone by the stage name Ricky Fentone, has written and recorded country, rockabilly and blues music.

== Biography ==
Harvey was born in Plymouth, England, and grew up in a small tin-mining town in rural Cornwall listening to the country, rock'n'roll and blues music. He started playing guitar and writing songs at the age of 13. Harvey began to develop his own distinctive style, taking bits from his early influences and adding in his own personality. In 1995, he recorded his first album Night Of Passion with his band The Flat Top Cats on a Prince's Trust grant. He performed under the name Ricky Fentone with the band until 1999, when the band broke up. Following their breakup he carried the Fentone stage name for a short time before switching to his own name. In 2004, he was signed by Kissy Music.

Harvey has had international chart success on the internet, repeated Top 20 chart positions, with several global No. 1s on sites such as Besonic and Soundclick, regular internet radio play and has gained a large worldwide following of country and rockabilly lovers who enjoy his music. Several European rock 'n' roll bands have covered his songs live, and recently, Dutch country singer Shannah has recorded a cover version of "Haystack Life" from the In The Hills album.

== Discography ==
A list of Shawn Harvey's commercially released albums, including those with the Flat Top Cats include:

- Without Your Love (2 Track CD Single) (2006)
- I Drove Up in My Cadillac Car (2 Track CD Single) (2006)
- Barbarella (2 Track CD Single) (2006)
- Cash On Delivery (2 Track CD Single) (2006)
- In The Hills (2005)
- Wild Wild Woman (5 Track CD Single) (2004)
- Modern Day Rock'n'Roll Star (2002)
- Mr. Rock'n'Roll (2002)
- International Renegade (2002)
- Cyberstruck (2002)
- Haystack Life (2002)
- Teasarama (2001)
- G.I. Jane (2001)
- Devil Inside (2001)
- 2151 (2001)[
- Cyberoxin (2001)
- Cyber Boy (2000)
- Chainsmokin' Louisiana Man (2000)
- Sexslave (2000)]
- Down on the Street (2000)
- Ain't It Mighty Funny (1999)
- Ricky Rocks And Ricky Rolls (1998)
- Rock'n'Rollin' Christmas (1997)
- Cadillac Man (1996)
- Don't Knock Me Don't Rock Me (1995)
- Night Of Passion (1995)
- Ricky Fentone and the Flat Top Cats (1995)
