= Jim Harvey (firearms) =

James Willard Harvey (May 7, 1893 – September 16, 1962) was an American designer of firearms, cartridges, and fishing lures, based out of Lakeville, Connecticut.

Among his firearms innovations, Harvey invented the .224 Harvey Kay-Chuck handgun cartridge, a wildcat cartridge based on the .22 Hornet, modified to fire in revolvers, a predecessor of the .22 Remington Jet.

Harvey at one point designed shotgun shells for revolvers, and modifying the barrels to remove the rifling and produce better patterning. However, the Bureau of Alcohol, Tobacco, and Firearms clarified that these smoothbore handguns were illegal under the 1934 National Firearms Act.
