= Nick Harvey (musician) =

British composer

- Born: 1971 (age 54–55)
- Education: Dartington College of Arts
- Occupation: Composer
- Website: www.nickharveycomposer.com

Nick Harvey (born 1971) is a BAFTA nominated British composer for TV and film. He has scored a diverse selection of productions; from BAFTA and Emmy award-winning dramas and documentaries, to light entertainment, commercials and musical theatre.
