= Tom Harvey =

British businessman

Tom Harvey MBE is a BAFTA winning creative entrepreneur and writer.

== Early life ==
Harvey was born outside Stevenage New Town; his father was sculptor Mark Harvey and his grandfather was author William Fryer Harvey. He attended the Nobel School Stevenage and the London College of Printing, where he studied photography, film and television.

== Career ==
Harvey is Chair of hip-hop dance theatre company BirdGang Ltd and a Trustee of the Peter Marlow Foundation. Harvey was the founder and CEO of London-based festival SohoCreate. Harvey was Chief Executive of Northern Film & Media, the creative industries development agency for North East England.

Harvey is an Executive Producer on One Night in Turin directed by James Erskine, and feature films Rising Tide, No Place To Hide, Frank, directed by Richard Heslop and Unconditional, directed by Bryn Higgins.

Harvey began working in the media industry at David Puttnam's feature film company Enigma Productions. He then worked as an Assistant Director, Production Manager and Producer on US and UK movies, television films and series, documentaries, short films and pop promos, including Happy Mondays and New Order, including their controversial promo Touched by the Hand of God, directed by Kathryn Bigelow.

He ran the Edinburgh International Television Festival for three years, developing the festival strands for young people, TVYP and TV25. He worked in senior management at the BBC as a Commissions and Strategy Executive on BBC2 and as Manager of the Independent Commissioning Group He was Managing Director of online interactive entertainment company XPT with Tim Wright and Rob Bevan.

As a playwright Harvey wrote the play Pool which won the Brockley Jack Theatre playwriting competition in 2014 and was produced by the Theatre in May/June 2014. The Verbatim play ABOUT LAST NIGHT in the 2017 general election, was performed at the Arcola Theatre with a cast including Monica Dolan and Helen Belbin. Harvey's short plays have been performed at The Park Theatre, The Jack, Theatre 503, Arts Theatre and The Cockpit. HER was selected for the ONE Festival at The Space Theatre and the FREE festival at Southwark Playhouse.

Harvey won the 2023 Seán Ó Faoláin International Short Story Competition at the Cork International Short Story Festival, he was a short story finalist in the London Independent Story Prize and has had work published by Bull Magazine, Litro Magazine, Mercurious and The Wells Street Journal.

Harvey is a Fellow 2007 of the Clore Leadership Programme, a graduate of Harvard Business School’s short course in Private Equity and Venture Capital 2009, and a Common Purpose Graduate 2003.

== Membership ==
Harvey is a member of BAFTA. He has an honours degree in film & TV, and in the past has served on the advisory board for IPPR North, the Board of Culture North East and the management board of music accelerator Generator.

== Awards ==
In the 2012 New Year Honours Harvey was awarded an MBE for services to the creative industries.

Winner of the 2023 Seán Ó Faoláin International Short Story Competition at the Cork International Short Story Festival,
