= Christian views on masturbation =

Christian views on masturbation are derived from the teachings of the ancient Jews, the Church Fathers and the Reformers. Christian denominations have traditionally viewed masturbation as sinful but, since the mid-twentieth century, there have been varying positions on the subject, with some denominations still viewing it as sinful and other churches viewing it as a healthy expression of God-given human sexuality.

== Bible ==
The passage of the Bible that relates to masturbation is Genesis 38:9–10, in which Onan was punished by God as he "spilled his seed upon the ground".

Most scholars have held that there are no explicit proscriptions in the Bible about masturbation. The word masturbation is never specifically mentioned in the Bible, nor are there any clear unchallenged references to masturbation. Various passages have been held to implicitly condemn or approve of masturbation, but others disagree; there is not "a clear condemnation of masturbation".

The biblical story of Onan (Genesis 38) is traditionally linked to referring to masturbation and condemnation thereof. A number of scholars have pointed out that the sexual act described by this story is coitus interruptus, not masturbation. Some go further and argue that Onan's death was solely due to his refusal to fulfill the obligation of levirate marriage, rather than any sexual sin. Others argue that Onan's punishment was both for his refusal to fulfill his obligations and because of his perverse sexual act. For example, James Nelson argues that Onan's act was condemned due to the firm "procreative" accent of the Hebrew interpretation regarding sexuality, where survival of the tribe depends on abundant procreation. The story was written by a "prescientific mind" that considered the child to be contained in the sperm the same way a plant is contained in its seed. Onan's offense was therefore the deliberate destruction of human life.

Leviticus 15:16–17 says that a man who has an emission of semen should wash and be ceremonially unclean until evening. Verse 18 goes on to say that if a man and woman have intercourse, the same cleanliness rules apply. Ilona N. Rashkow states that Leviticus 15:16 "refers to the emission rather than its circumstances." According to James R. Johnson, by bringing up intercourse separately, the passage implies that the emission of semen in verses 16 and 17 occurred for the man individually. The passage may be referring to a nocturnal emission, or wet dream, rather than masturbation, but the passage is not specific. In contrast, Deuteronomy 23:9–11 explicitly specifies nocturnal emission. Johnson thus views this passage as suggesting that masturbation is a purely ceremonial cleanliness issue, and not as a matter of morality. Johnson also notes that the passage puts no more disapproval on the solitary experience than it does on intercourse.

Matthew 5:29–30, Matt. 18:6–9, and Mark 9:42–48 state that, if they cause one to sin, one should tear out one's eye and cut off one's hand or foot. Will Deming states "The sinning by eye, hand, and foot may come from a tradition of formulaic warnings against lustful gazing (by the eye), masturbation (by hand), and adultery (by 'foot', the Hebrew euphemism for genitalia)," referencing the Niddah, specifically m. Nid. 2.1 and b. Nid. 13b. In addition to the eye, Deming argues that "the hand plays a major role in lust as well through masturbation". William Loader links this to the story of Origen, where perhaps Origen read "foot" and "hand" as euphemisms for penis and castrated himself. Loader views attaching special meanings to the body parts in these passages as over-interpretation, as these passages are mainly hyperbole.

1 Thessalonians 4:3–4 reads: “What God wants is for you all to be holy. He wants you to keep away from fornication [porneia], and each of you to know how to use the body that belongs to him in a way that is holy and honorable, not giving way to selfish lust like the pagans who do not know God.” The Greek word porneia (πορνεία) is used in other New Testament passages such as Galatians 5:19–23 and has a general meaning of sexual immorality or unchastity. More generally, Paul refers to purity and contamination in 2 Corinthians 7:1. Some commentators view the word porneia as including masturbation, and see these passages as implicitly confirming the immorality of masturbation. Others disagree, holding that this passage simply condemns the pagans' then-common sexual licentiousness and promiscuity, and has no relevance to masturbation.

Romans 1:24 and 1 Corinthians 6:10 are sometimes held to refer to masturbation, but Dedek argues that they refer to sodomy and pederasty respectively.

1 Corinthians 7:3–5 has been held by some to allow masturbation in the context of marriage. The passage may imply that masturbation should not necessarily be a normal circumstance, but if for example sexual tension becomes unmanageable due to extended separation, Johnson states "masturbation would not counteract the divine purpose" with the consent of one's spouse.

== Early Christian attitudes ==
=== Jewish antecedents ===
According to a 2023 AdventistToday.org article, "Biblical Hebrew has no word for masturbation. Some have even questioned if the concept existed; they argue that it is impossible to have an idea without corresponding vocabulary... Indeed, all the rabbis appear concerned primarily with the appropriate use of semen. The rabbis considered spilling semen on the ground a sin... in the Jewish tradition, the primary concern had nothing to do with masturbation but the appropriate treatment of one's semen."

Sociologist Rodney Stark agrees that Jews and early Christians opposed the spilling of semen on the ground and that, therefore, on the basis of the Onan story, acts such as mutual masturbation were considered sinful by these communities, in contrast to the surrounding Greco-Roman culture's pagan form of sexual morality.

According to Jew FAQ, "Jewish law clearly prohibits male masturbation. This law is derived from the story of Onan (Gen. 38:8–10), who practiced coitus interruptus as a means of birth control to avoid fathering a child for his deceased brother. G-d killed Onan for this sin. Although Onan's act was not truly masturbation, Jewish law takes a very broad view of the acts prohibited by this passage, and forbids any act of ha-sh'cha'tat zerah (destruction of the seed), that is, ejaculation outside of the vagina. In fact, the prohibition is so strict that one passage in the Talmud states, "in the case of a man, the hand that reaches below the navel should be chopped off". (Niddah 13a)"

Phillip Tahmindjis, an associate professor of law at the Queensland University of Technology and a legal consultant to the Queensland office of Australia's Federal Human Rights and Equal Opportunity Commission, states that, according to a "plain reading of the Bible, masturbation was a sin for the Jews." American theologian Anthony Costello agrees stating, "In sum, according to the most widely accepted tradition of Jewish law, masturbation is undoubtedly sinful."

A Messianic Jew, Reb Yhoshua, notes the similarity between this Talmudic injunction and Jesus' statement in Matthew 5:30: "... And if your right hand causes you to sin, cut it off and throw it away; it is better that you lose one of your members than that your whole body go into hell." Yhoshua's theory is that, "Jesus was using... hyperbole... to communicate the sinfulness of masturbation. It is extremely unlikely that he ever intended for any kind of amputation to take place." Craig S. Keener agrees that this statement by Jesus is,"... possibly a reference to masturbation..." as do Paul C. Vitz and William V. Williams. Kevin J. Vanhoozer also agrees that this inference is suggested by the Talmudic parallels. He furthermore notes that, at the very least, Jesus clearly forbids masturbation if accompanied by sexual fantasies of a person other than one's spouse.

The Questions.org website, which is part of the non-denominational Our Daily Bread Ministries, argues that, "Leviticus 15:16-17 makes it clear that masturbation would have been considered "unclean" under Old Testament Law".

=== Early church ===
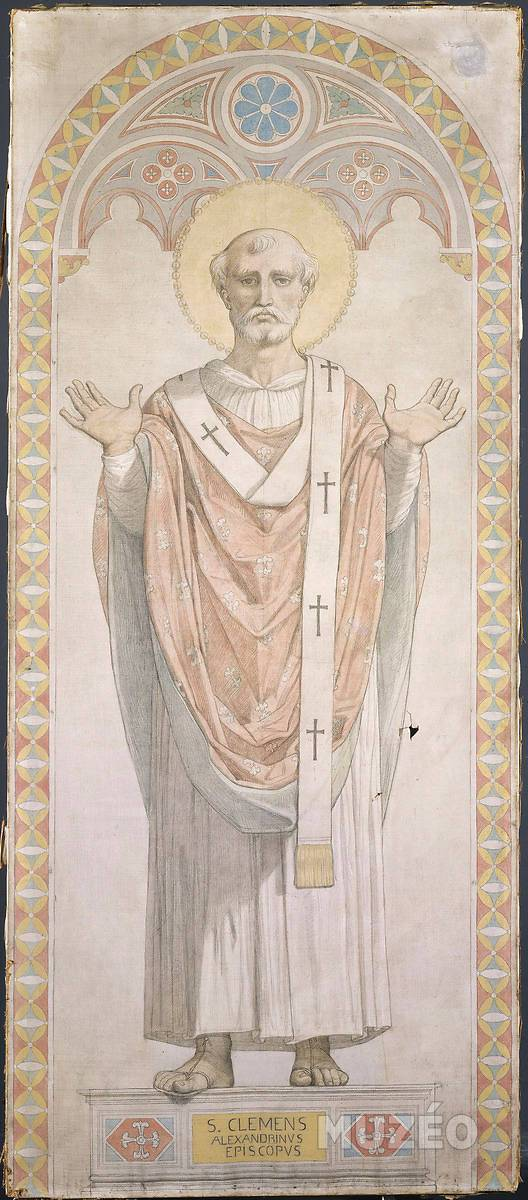
Ante-Nicene Church Father Clement of Alexandria (c. 150 – c. 215) writes in The Instructor: "Seed should not be sown on rocky ground nor scattered everywhere, for it is the primary substance of generation and contains embedded in itself the principle of nature."

Greek-Egyptian Church Father Clement of Alexandria (c. 150–c. 215 CE) writes in his Paedagogus, or The Instructor of Children:

(83) [...] Seed should not be sown on rocky ground nor scattered everywhere, for it is the primary substance of generation and contains imbedded [sic] in itself the principle of nature. It is undeniably godless, then, to dishonor principles of nature by wasting them on unnatural resting places. (91) [...] In fact, he says: 'Do not touch anyone, except your wedded wife,' [...] This is to share in God's own work of creation, and in such a work the seed ought not be wasted nor scattered thoughtlessly nor sown in a way it cannot grow. (95) [...] To indulge in intercourse without intending children is to outrage nature, whom we should take as our instructor. [...] The attempt to procreate children is marriage, but the promiscuous scattering of seed contrary to law and to reason definitely is not.

Scholars such as Raj Bhala and Kathryn M. Kueny say that Clement's statements include both coitus interruptus and masturbation, these being the acts which make "injury to nature". "The use of spermicidal potions" is also included within it, according to Kueny. John G. Younger notes that Clement speaks about masturbation as well as "masculine women and effeminate men" in his Paedagogus. He says Clement makes mention that it is to violate the laws of nature "to have sex for any other purpose than to produce children".

Aside from Clement, the fathers of the Church were practically silent on the question of masturbation. The Roman Catholic historian, Adriano Cappelli, for example does not find any other mention of masturbation in the writings of the Apostolic Fathers (c. 60–200 CE). Cappelli states that "It would be wrong, however, to interpret the silence of the Fathers about masturbation as a tacit approval of it, or as a virtual indifference."

The New Catholic Encyclopaedia notes that during the Patristic period and Middle Ages, some commentators thought the Greek term "malakoi" (softness) found in 1 Corinthians 6:9, referred to masturbators. The modern Greek word for masturbator, Malakas, derives from it.

James A. Brundage offers a differing view. He believes that pagan and early Christian writers "apparently considered [the activity] trivial" and "paid only scant attention to masturbation..." The liberal Jesuit scholar James F. Keenan declares: "In fact, as Cappelli, Louis Crompton, and James Brundage each observe, prior to Cassian, masturbation was not considered a sexual offence for anyone."

Scholars such as Robert Baker and Simon Lienyueh Wei believe that Augustine of Hippo (354–430) thought masturbation was a sin. Merry E. Wiesner-Hanks and Carly Daniel-Hughes agree, saying that Augustine condemns all sexual activities that are contrary to procreation including homosexual acts and masturbation – or "solitary pleasure". Carly adds that Augustine also regards "mutual masturbation" as "unnatural intercourse" based on Romans 1.

According to Simon Lienyueh Wei, John Cassian and Augustine of Hippo believed that it was a sin if nocturnal emission is the outcome of "a lustful encounter or pleasurable recollection"; otherwise, it was seen as "a physical function".

=== Celtic Christianity ===
Celtic penitentials treated the subject in a practical and juridical way in the sixth century. Canon 8 of the Synod of the Grove of Victory from the 6th century imposes penances for "he who [has relations] between the thighs, [three] years. However, if by one's own hand or the hand of another, two years." Those acts refer to "mutual masturbation" and "femoral fornication".

Gildas also condemns masturbation in his monastic rule.

Another early set of rules which also prescribes penances for masturbation are Excerpts from the Book of St. David

Later, many other penitentials, such as Penitential of Finnian, Penitential of Columban, Penitential of Cummean and the two "synods of Saint Patrick", impose penances with different levels of severity for masturbation (alone or in company) to monastics and laity.

== Teaching by denominations ==
=== Eastern Orthodoxy ===
Bernard Hoose and Mark Jordan suggest that claims to a continuous teaching by the Church on matters of sexuality, life and death and crime and punishment are "simply not true". Per Keenan, not only was there "inconsistency, contradiction and even incoherence" in the Church's doctrines, but tradition itself is "not the truth guarantor of any particular teaching".

A Byzantine Church Father and Doctor of the Church, Epiphanius of Salamis (310/320 – 403), states in his Panarion, or Medicine Chest:

They [the Egyptian Gnostics] exercise genital acts, yet prevent the conceiving of children. Not in order to produce offspring, but to satisfy lust, are they eager for corruption.

John T. Noonan Jr. said that these Gnostics practiced "nonprocreative sexual acts" and that these were central to their religious rituals. He says that Epiphanius calls these practices, which include coitus interruptus, masturbation, and homosexual acts, "the rites and ceremonies of the devil".

With the rise of monasticism in the 4th and 5th centuries, Christian writers began to focus on monastic discipline, therefore masturbation as a serious moral problem.

Shenoute (348–466), a Byzantine abbot who is considered a saint in Oriental Orthodoxy, viewed masturbation as a form of sexual "misconduct" and an "outright illicit sexual activity". The Canons of Shenoute contain the prohibition, "Cursed be whoever dares with his own hands to grasp his members for a deed of impurity, that is, defilement".

The Canons of John the Faster (died 595) condemn the activity.

The Eastern Orthodox Church today views sexuality as a gift from God that finds its fulfillment in the marital relationship, and therefore the misuse of the gift of human sexuality is sinful. Because the act of masturbation is self-directed, and by its nature is incapable of expressing love and concern for another person, it is viewed as a distortion of the use of the gift of sexuality. This is especially apparent when masturbation becomes an addiction. In the least, the practice of self-pleasure is viewed as not honoring the purpose of God's gift of sexuality.

A controversial senior figure in the Russian Orthodox Church, Andrei Tkarchev, known for his pro-war sermons argues that societal tolerance of masturbation was one of the factors that caused the Ukraine War. He has declared, "If seed is spilled, then blood will be spilled. This is one of the factors explaining why war occurs – because seed is spilled indiscriminately. Seed contains blood; seed contains a person... The only place where a man's seed should flow is into the womb of his lawful wife. That's it! If seed is spilled elsewhere, then along with it, future blood is spilled. Where depravity appears, bloodshed is inevitable."

According to a church in Arizona, "the Orthodox view of masturbation... [is it] is a form of physical, emotional and spiritual suicide. This view is supported by Romans 8:13 which tells us: "For if you live according to the flesh you will die, but if by the Spirit you put to death the misdeeds of the body you will live." All sexual sin is destructive because it involves some form of abuse of the body. The Bible declares that the body is a temple of the Holy Spirit and must be treated as such. Any form of abuse against the body is an act of disrespect not only to the body, but to the Holy Spirit to Whom the body is dedicated. We are called upon to care for our bodies in such a manner that we honor God first and then honor ourselves. When we attempt to gratify ourselves through the various forms of sexual addictions, we not only deny ourselves a healthy perspective of ourselves, we also deny God the opportunity to bring us into communion with Him and a potential partner with whom we can enjoy the sacrament of marriage that is based upon a mutual love and respect for one another. It is difficult to treat this particular addiction because of the medical and scientific professions that promote masturbation as a healthy way to nurture one's sexual needs..."

An Antiochian Orthodox archpriest writes that "the sexual sins of fornication, adultery and masturbation, as well as hatred, jealousy, drunkenness and other sins are considered to be sins of the heart as much as the body. It is thought that turning away from sexual sin is turning away from self-indulgence for the purpose of self gratification. Instead of turning to the desires of the flesh, the Orthodox Christian turns to the Holy Spirit, whose fruit is believed to be love, joy, peace, patience, kindness, goodness, faithfulness, gentleness and self-control."

The Orthodox Christian Information Centre cites 1 Thessalonians 4:3–5 as another key Biblical text in the Orthodox arguments against masturbation.

=== Oriental Orthodoxy ===
The Coptic Orthodox Church believes masturbation is a sin because it is a "form of sexual pleasure outside of God's design".

=== Roman Catholicism ===
Aurélie Godefroy explains that the Roman Catholic Church did not always believe masturbation was a mortal sin.

==== Late Classical period ====
Stephen Greenblatt states, "Medieval Christian theologians . . . did have a clear concept of masturbation as a sin, but it was not, Laqueur claims, a sin in which they had particularly intense interest. With the exception of the fifth-century abbot John Cassian, they were far more concerned with what Laqueur calls the ethics of social sexuality..."

In his Conferences John Cassian (c. 360–435) writes, "Of fornication there are three sorts: [...] (2) that which takes place without touching a woman, for which we read that Onan the son of the patriarch Judah was smitten by the Lord; and which is termed by Scripture uncleanness".

Brundage states that Cassian regarded, "... masturbation and nocturnal pollution central issues in sexual morality and devoted a great deal of attention to both matters". He thinks that Cassian considered, "... nocturnal emission" a very important problem as it is an indication of "carnal lust" and, if a monk did not overcome it, "his religious life and his salvation might well be in peril".

In the Conlationes, Cassian used the word "uncleanness" (immunditia, as written in Colossians 3:5) as a substitute for both masturbation and nocturnal emissions, indicating he regarded masturbation as an unacceptable form of "sexual release". In the De institutis coenobiorum, he gives particular emphasis on "the sin of fornication, which includes masturbation and sexual fantasising".

==== Dark Ages ====
In his Sermons, Caesarius of Arles (470–543) states, "Sometimes, this evil inclination [to masturbate] steals over even the saints and good Christians in such a way that it effects in them when they are asleep what it cannot do when they are awake. How many times they are defiled by temptations unwillingly and against their volition." Brundage sees this as a view similar to Cassian's, classifying sexual arousal, desired or undesired, as a serious sin on an even footing with adultery.

Isidore of Seville, a Latin Church Father and Doctor of the Church, believed masturbation was an "effeminate" habit, though the early penitential writers do not seem to particularly concur with him. In his Etymologiae (c. 600–625), Isidore says that, by masturbating, a man dishonors, "the vigor of his sex by his languid body".

Mark W. Elliott says that Pope Gregory I (c. 540 – 604) argued that Leviticus 15, (which discusses ritual defilement) provided ".. rules for all in the church community by relating emission to... sexual intercourse rather than the previous monastic 'nocturnal emission' interpretation... He does, however, specify that nocturnal emissions – if caused by natural superfluity or sickness – are unproblematic for holiness, but where there is consent (i.e., masturbation) they are problematic." Making a parallel between women's menstruation and "the involuntary loss of semen", Gregory declared that "natural superfluities" prevent neither laity nor clergy from participating in the Eucharist.

The Paenitentiale Theodori and the Paenitentiale Bedae condemn the activity.

From the sixth to the eleventh century, there are more references in the penitentials to masturbation, but it is considered with much more indulgence than the other sins of flesh. In the penitential written by Archbishop Theodore of Tarsus (seventh century), for example, "the penance is from seven days for the cleric who poured out his seed without touching himself, up to fifty days for the one who voluntarily masturbates spread in a church. Fifty days may seem a lot, but it's tiny when you know that at the same time, a young man touching a virgin woman gets a full year."

Keenan, citing Cappelli, claims that the concerns of these writers were not with the act of masturbation, but with upholding the vows of chastity made by monks. "The monks' promise made masturbation an illicit act; the act itself was not considered sinful." Thomas Laqueur agrees, noting that, "The ancient world cared little about the subject; it was a backwater of Jewish and Christian teaching about sexuality."

==== Medieval period ====
After the turn of the first millennium, more theologians began to condemn masturbation, and did so in an increasingly strident manner. Peter Damian, a Doctor of the Roman Catholic Church, in his Book of Gomorrah addressed to Pope Leo IX, wrote that masturbation is the lowest grade of homosexual sin. If left unchecked, it can "ascend by grades" to "fondling each other's male parts" (mutual masturbation), which can lead one to "fornicate between the thighs" (femoral intercourse) "or even in the rear" (anal intercourse).

Pope Leo IX himself condemned masturbation more clearly in his Ad splendidum nitentis (1054), from which time the act was perceived as a mortal sin, and classified as a sexual deviance. However tolerance for the sin continued to be great, as the historian François Lebrun explains: "It is significant to note that [masturbation]...is of all sins against nature the only one that does not appear never in the list of reserved cases, that is to say, whose absolution is, in view of their gravity, reserved for the bishop alone. Is it not proof that it is far too common for every priest to have the possibility of absolving it immediately without referring to his superior?"

In a 2023 guest article for the National Catholic Reporter, American Jesuit scholar James F. Keenan argued, "... we could examine the so-called consistent [Roman Catholic] teaching on masturbation, which excepting Clement, was never assessed as a sin until John Cassian (360-435) and Caesarius of Arles (470-542) made it one, but only for monks and nuns who, violated their vows of chastity by masturbating. Still, eight centuries later when Pope Innocent III imposed upon the entire church the Easter duty in 1215 requiring an annual confession of all Christians, sexual teachings change. Now masturbation is considered gravely sinful for all. The genesis of masturbation as sinful was precisely dependent upon the vow of chastity of those who chose the ascetical life. What was a sin for a 40-year-old monk in the eighth century became, however, the same sin for a 13-year-old boy or girl in the 13th century."

Pierre Humbert states, "During the Middle Ages, masturbation – so-called "softness" – was considered an unnatural sin, but for the vast majority of theologians, priests and confessors, the offense was much less serious than fornication, adultery or sodomy; and they generally preferred not to talk too much about it so as not to suggest its existence to those who did not know about it."

Thomas Aquinas wrote that masturbation is an "unnatural vice," and is a species of lust like bestiality, sodomy, and pederasty, and that "by procuring pollution [i.e., ejaculation apart from intercourse], without any copulation, for the sake of venereal pleasure ... pertains to the sin of 'uncleanness' which some call 'effeminacy' [Latin: mollitiem, lit. 'softness, unmanliness']." Indeed, "masturbation, anal intercourse and homosexuality were, according to Aquinas, the worst sins after murder because they were against the divine order." Liberal voices in the 21st century Catholic and Anglican churches have been critical of Aquinas for coming to this conclusion.

In the late medieval period, Jean Gerson wrote a confessional manual called On the Confession of Masturbation. By doing so, he broke with two hundred years of silence on the issue. According to researcher Chloë Taylor, Gerson's manual tells clerics to "insist that (male) penitents admit to the sin of masturbation, which...was deemed...[by this time to be an] even more serious sin than raping a nun, incest, or abducting and raping virgins and wives however more common and indeed universal (among males) a sin it was assumed to be, judging from the incredulity with which deniers of masturbation were instructed to be met..."

Taylor goes on to note that, "Medieval theologians recognized that by inquiring in...suggestive detail, and with...leading questions, they ran the risk of teaching sinful behaviors to penitents who had not previously been aware of the full range of sexual possibilities available to them. They deduced, however that it was worth teaching a few young penitents how to masturbate in order to save the greater number who were already masturbating without confessing to it." She notes that, according to Gerson's book, "Even once the penitent has admitted his sin the priest is not to be satisfied, and is to ask for further details...Particularly remarkable are the instructions that the priest feign a certain casualness, and that he address the confessant with a disarming affection, calling him "friend" and pretending that masturbation is neither sinful nor shameful in order to make the penitent admit to it, insinuating that he can relate to the penitent's acts – "Friend, I well believe it" – only to then backtrack and condemn the act as sinful and shameful after all."

Robert of Flamborough and Peter of Poitiers both wrote confessionals condemning the act. Peter of Poitiers devoted an entire chapter to "the monster of masturbation" and believed that, once confessed to, it should be dealt with harshly because the act made the sinner both active and passive and because, unlike other sexual sins which could be prevented by avoiding the company of the co-offender, "you cannot avoid yourself or the domestic situations in which the sin is likely to happen."

The laity did not undertake regular confession at this time but, "For those such as the ordained and the scrupulous who did undergo frequent and rigorous confessional examination, the obligation to confess in circumstances such as Gerson describes for even the most routine and private of sins such as masturbation came to cause anxiety... Early medieval penance was only for grave sins, but now the most mundane of sins could be given excruciating attention."

Brundage notes that medieval "... penitentials occasionally mentioned female autoeroticism and lesbianism. They treated female masturbation in much the same way as the male act, although they were more censorious of female sexual play that involved dildos and other mechanical aids than they were of male use of mechanical devices in masturbation."

The late medieval German Franciscan friar, Dietrich Coelde, wrote a catechism for the laity who wished to live as much like clergy as possible entitled, The Mirror of the Christian Man. One of the subjects it addressed was the sin of masturbation.

The Roman Catholic Church accused Albigensians of masturbation in its propaganda campaign against them.

==== Sixteenth century ====
In Catholic France, during the reign of Henry III, masturbation carried the death sentence though it was rarely prosecuted.

==== Seventeenth Century ====
According to Sokolov, "In the time of Renaissance and in the XVII century masturbation wasn't considered a great sin, though many authors condemned it."

==== Counter-reformation ====
According to Aurélie Godefroy, "... until the eighteenth century, masturbation did not hold much of a place in the Catholic imagination, where it was most often referred to as simple interruptus coitus".

Part of the Catholics' response to the Protestants' stricter morals was for the Holy Office to issue a decree in March 1679 condemning the activity.

After the Council of Trent, casuists and probabilists attacked masturbation claiming it was a violation of nature's aim of propagating the human race.

==== Enlightenment ====
Laqueur links a reconsideration of the seriousness of masturbation with the publication of an anonymous tract entitled Onania. Prior to this, according to historian William E. Burns, "Christians had long considered masturbation a sin but had not treated it as very important."

Lacquer writes, "Masturbation is a creation of the Enlightenment, of some of its most important figures, and of the most profound changes it unleashed. It is modern. It worried at first not conservatives, but progressives. It was the first truly democratic sexuality that could be of ethical interest for women as much as for men, for boys and girls as much as for their elders." This is because Laqueur claims that masturbation "could only be named as such when the 'self' emerged as an autonomous being."

According to an Australian ABC report, in religious dialogue, "... masturbation [was] kind of left out of the equation. While we have these constant negotiations about what it means to have sex and have sex with other people, other genders, that's constantly in discussion, masturbation just kind of slips through the cracks. So much so that it takes until this publication in 1712 for the term masturbation to even be coined."

==== Eighteenth century ====
The Catholic moral theologian St. Alphonsus di Liguori referred to masturbation as "softness" (molities) or "pollution" (pollutio), and he distinguished male and female masturbation, both of which involve the emission of the seed (mucus or semen):

Masturbation, or pollution, is when, without intercourse or copulation, the voluntary emission of semen is induced—whether it is ejaculated outward, as in males, or flows inward into the uterus, as in females.

==== Nineteenth century ====
Arthur N. Gilbert claims that, by the nineteenth century, "Catholic Frenchmen were as concerned with masturbation as their Protestant neighbors across the English Channel."

==== Twentieth century ====
Keenan argues, "From Albert the Great and Thomas Aquinas until the 20th century, the moral treatises distinguished between sexual sins "in accordance with nature" and those "contrary to nature."... in general the latter sins (solitary or mutual masturbation, contraception, anal or oral intercourse, bestiality) were considered more grievous, such was the obsession with the finality of semen and the "fit vessel." That masturbation was so long and consistently taught to be more grievous than rape might give us pause about the argument from consistency. And, it might also suggest how inadequately grievous rape was considered by the celibate theologians. The sins against nature received further treatment by being coupled with two other conceptual categories: "intrinsic evil" and "parvity of matter." "Intrinsic evil" comes from the 14th-century Durandus of Saint-Pourçain (1270-1334), the anti-Thomist detractor. The term described a particular type of action as absolutely, always wrong regardless of circumstances... They were described as such either because the action was against nature and/or the agent had no right to the exercise of such activity. All sexual acts against nature were now also classified as intrinsically evil. As intrinsically evil, all sexual acts against nature were now unequivocally exceptionless. No circumstance could mitigate their sinfulness.

James J. Walter and Timothy E. O'Connell state that, "... as long ago as 1968, Curran used the idea [of fundamental option] as a way to make sense of the fact that the Catholic tradition has long held that masturbation is an objectively serious misuse of human sexuality even though statistical evidence suggests that the overwhelming majority of human persons – including many whose behavior otherwise suggests a generous and loving approach to life – engage in this behavior. What shall we make of this paradox?...Curran suggests that for various reasons the assertion that masturbation involves "objectively grave matter" is not convincing. In this regard, his argument is about the objective character of the action and not the nature of the moral person."

Later, Curran stated in his works, "Generally speaking I believe masturbation is wrong since it fails to integrate sexuality into the service of love. Masturbation indicates a failure at a total integration of sexuality in the person. This wrongness is not always grave; in fact, more times it is not...Catholic educators should openly teach that masturbation is not always a grave matter and most times, especially for adolescents, is not that important...However, the teacher should not leave the adolescent with the impression that there is absolutely nothing wrong with masturbation." In 1986, Curran was banned from teaching Catholic theology by the Prefect of the Congregation for the Doctrine of the Faith, Cardinal Joseph Ratzinger, because of his statements on "contraception, sterilization, masturbation, divorce, and homosexuality".

Pope Pius XII's Allocutio (Oct 8th, 1953), and Acta Apostolicae Sedis 48 (dated the 19th of May, 1956), also condemned masturbation.

A study commissioned by the Catholic Theological Society of America (CTSA) in 1972 and carried out by Rev. Anthony Kosnik and his co-authors (but not approved by its board of directors when published in 1977), showed that a number of Catholic theologians had come to believe that masturbation should not be judged as an objective moral evil, but assessed within the life context of the person involved. The authors of the book held a position similar to Curran's. They did not say that masturbation is not a sin, only that "not every deliberately willed act of masturbation necessarily constitutes the grave matter required for mortal sin". Reaction to the study showed that the dissent was not unanimous, and it brought about debates inside the CTSA itself. In 1979, the Sacred Congregation for the Doctrine of the Faith published an advisory that deplored the book's "erroneous conclusions", argued that there were "numerous misreadings of the teaching of the Second Vatican Council" in it, and said that it diminished "the morality of sexual love to a matter of 'personal sentiments, feelings, [and] customs'" George Weigel restated that "these theological errors led to practical guidelines that 'either dissociate themselves from or directly contradict Catholic teaching' as taught by the Church's highest teaching authority."

In 1983, the Vatican issued its first guidelines on sex education for Roman Catholic parents and teachers, entitled Educational Guidance in Human Love. It warned against masturbation but advised that, "family and teachers should look for causes before trying to repress behavior".

While Curran thought that masturbation could be morally acceptable under certain conditions, Richard A. Spinello, argued that Pope John Paul II did not say that masturbation is always immoral because "the physical act itself is wrong and disordered". Spinello argues that Pope John Paul II does not examine the physical act as the sole basis for moral judgment. In Veritatis splendor, John Paul II holds that "the morality of the human act" is judged by considering what one chooses rationally by "the deliberate will", and by "the proximate end". In his encyclical, he writes: "In order to be able to grasp the object of an act which specifies that act morally, it is therefore necessary to place oneself in the perspective of the acting person." Masturbation not always incurs grave sin, or mortal sin, but it can not be said that masturbation is not "gravely wrong" nor constitutes "grave matter". Joseph Farraher concludes that masturbation incurs venial sin in case "the act is performed with only partial realization or only partial choice of the will", or, in Harvey's words, "no grievous sin...while lacking in awareness, as when he is half awake, or half asleep, or when a person is carried away by sudden passion and finds himself committing the act despite the resistance of the will".

In his attempt to explain John Paul II's Theology of the Body, Anthony Percy writes in his book that "pornography and masturbation represent the destruction of the symbolic and nuptial meaning of the human body...God gives all men and women erotic energy. We call it the sex drive. This is good and it forms part of that attraction between men and women, which itself forms part of the nuptial meaning of the body. Sexual energy, therefore, needs to find its outlet in love, not lust...In masturbation that erotic energy is turned in on oneself...Masturbation, therefore, is a symbol, not of love, but of loneliness." Jeffrey Tranzillo adds to explain: "Whenever man and woman employ the body to simulate love or authenticity for reasons that are ultimately self-serving and hence destructive of self and others, they falsify the language it was created to speak. That is what underlies the sin of adultery." He says that "such misuse of the body also underlies other sexual sins like contraception, masturbation, fornication, and homosexual acts".

In a 1993 paper entitled The Pastoral Problem of Masturbation, the Pennsylvanian Roman Catholic scholar, John F. Harvey, referred to masturbation as a "weakness" and "disordered tendency".

==== Current Roman Catholic stance ====
Today, Roman Catholics still believe it is a mortal sin.

In the Catechism of the Catholic Church, the Catholic Church teaches:

By masturbation is to be understood the deliberate stimulation of the genital organs in order to derive sexual pleasure. "Both the Magisterium of the Church, in the course of a constant tradition, and the moral sense of the faithful have been in no doubt and have firmly maintained that masturbation is an intrinsically and gravely disordered action." "The deliberate use of the sexual faculty, for whatever reason, outside of marriage is essentially contrary to its purpose." For here sexual pleasure is sought outside of "the sexual relationship which is demanded by the moral order and in which the total meaning of mutual self-giving and human procreation in the context of true love is achieved". To form an equitable judgment about the subjects' moral responsibility and to guide pastoral action, one must take into account the affective immaturity, force of acquired habit, conditions of anxiety or other psychological or social factors that lessen, if not even reduce to a minimum, moral culpability.

Although "it is said that psychology and sociology show that [masturbation] is a normal phenomenon of sexual development, especially among the young," this does not change the fact that it "is an intrinsically and seriously disordered act" and "that, whatever the motive for acting this way, the deliberate use of the sexual faculty outside normal conjugal relations essentially contradicts the finality of the faculty. For it lacks the sexual relationship called for by the moral order, namely the relationship which realizes 'the full sense of mutual self-giving and human procreation in the context of true love.'"

This is because the deliberate use of the sexual faculty outside of marriage is, according to the teaching of the Church, contrary to its primary purpose of procreation and unification of the husband and wife within the sacrament of marriage. In addition, the Church teaches that all other sexual activity – including masturbation, homosexual acts, acts of sodomy, all sex outside of or before marriage (fornication), and the use of any form of contraception or birth control – is gravely disordered, as it frustrates the natural order, purpose, and ends of sexuality.

To form an equitable judgment about the subjects' moral responsibility and to guide pastoral action, one must take into account the affective immaturity, force of acquired habit, conditions of anxiety or other psychological or social factors that lessen, if not even reduce to a minimum, moral culpability.

In a 2004 pastoral letter, a Pennsylvanian Roman Catholic bishop, Joseph Martino, referred to masturbation as "evil".

Furthermore, "natural law... as usually developed... entails the sinfulness of masturbation and contraception."

Peter Sellick, a deacon from the Anglican Diocese of Perth, writes, of the Roman Catholic Church, "Once it is decided, by reason of natural law, that sexual activity has only one function i.e. fecundity, it is decided that any other activity is disordered. This means that the only appropriate receptacle for semen is the vagina. It is therefore held that male masturbation is a sin as is any sexual activity between same sex male couples who must live under the judgment that their relationships are "inherently disordered." This understanding also condemns any form of assisted conception."

In 2005, the Irish Independent noted, "Among the largely disregarded mortal sins listed in the catechism of the Catholic church are masturbation, fornication (sex between unmarried men and women), pornography and "homosexual practices". The church still regards the mortal sin of masturbation (commonly known in ecclesiastical circles as onanism) as "an intrinsically and gravely disordered action"; but... the hard-line appears to be softening. The latest edition of the catechism outlines some mitigating circumstances that reduce the gravity of the sin. Priests are asked to "take into account the affective immaturity, force of acquired habit, conditions of anxiety or other psychological or social factors that lessen, if not even reduce to a minimum, moral culpability"".

An American Roman Catholic magazine, Our Sunday Visitor, adds, with regard to these mitigating circumstances, "Other sexual sins usually require a person to actively seek occasions for sin by looking at pornography or seeking the company of others and planning to be alone with them. But one cannot simply get away from oneself or one's own thoughts. Self-mastery with regard to masturbation and the sexual thoughts that precede it is often a long journey... This does not mean there is no sin in masturbation. Even if it is not always mortal, it is still sinful and one bears the guilt of committing this sin. Regular confession remains essential".

In an article for Christianity Today's "Her.meneutics" theology series for females the celibate lesbian Roman Catholic contributor, Eve Tushnet, in writing on masturbation, declares, "... our nearly universal failure at chastity is not an argument against it. My inability to be "good enough" is in its own way a gift. It reminds me that virtue... is not something I must strive to attain by and for myself. I depend daily on God's mercy. And I hope knowing this affects how I treat others. The admission, "I can't," prompts us to be gentler with other people's struggles and sins, whatever they may be—not to justify our own... Much of the resistance to the traditional teaching against masturbation comes from a desire to reduce sexual shame. Shame isolates us in secrecy, its own secluded poison garden. It drives us to hide, separating us from God and others.

In July 2018, Homiletic and Pastoral Review declared, "Contraception and masturbation are implicitly condemned by the death penalty God delivered to Onan for his contraceptive behavior."

For Roman Catholics, "digital and oral stimulation of the clitoris or vagina, even as 'foreplay', remain strictly forbidden".

A Dutch Roman Catholic theologian, Hendro Munsterman, has called for a "theology of the clitoris". Once thought to be for pleasure only, the clitoris is now known to have a reproductive purpose. An anonymous female journalist for FemCatholic still rejected masturbation as sinful for women in a February 2023 article.

In a 2024 study, the Catholic medical researchers, Paul C. Vitz and William V. Williams, claim that,

Spiritually, masturbation is highly positively correlated with pornography consumption and negatively with religion and religiosity. There is a higher rate of masturbation in homosexuals and bisexuals than in heterosexuals. Theologically, masturbation and pornography directly violate the religious virtue of chastity, undermining one's prayer life and the motivation to develop a spiritual life. Therapeutically, positive psychology, which emphasizes cultivating what it identifies as virtues, including justice, courage, temperance, wisdom (similar to prudence), transcendence (similar to hope) and humanity (similar to charity), can be used to counsel individuals struggling with masturbation.

Benedict XVI argued against masturbation in his Ratzinger Report.

The late Pope Francis likewise upheld the belief that masturbation is a sin. In a 2023 documentary, he said it "lessens" and "depletes" its practitioners.

=== Protestantism ===
Both Martin Luther, the founder of the Lutheran Churches, as well as John Calvin, the founder of the Reformed Churches, condemned masturbation in their works.

Indeed, "both Protestant and Catholic reformers insisted on a strict morality intended to confine all sexual activity to married couples... Powerful injunctions against fornication, adultery, homosexuality, and masturbation accompanied the new, positive emphasis on marriage and family".

Adrian Thatcher says that Protestants have historically regarded masturbation as a sin, and to justify this stance, they "appeal directly to the Bible whenever possible".

Anthony Costello agrees, declaring, "All the early Church Fathers and Reformers too were unanimous on the issue of masturbatory acts (or any act of sexual intercourse not open to procreation)."

Barbara Taylor notes, "... the shamefulness of concupiscence was a constant of Christian teaching. Protestantism, by drawing God – and the Devil – into the individual psyche, upped the ante. The inner world of the believer became a cosmic battleground, with sex as its front line. Accusations of witchcraft and diabolic possession flourished, and masturbation was a key sign of the Evil One's presence."

==== Lutheranism ====
Lutheran theology emphasises the Biblical notion that the body is a temple and that "...godly habits (cf. 1 Tim. 4:8)... are to be practiced... so that our bodies may be "living sacrifices, holy and pleasing to God" (Rom 12:1)."

===== Reformation =====
A forerunner of the reformers, Girolamo Savonarola, believed that masturbation was a mortal sin.

According to the historian, Steven Ozment, the early reformer, Andreas Karlstadt's, work (which declared that, "the celibate life... [is] seen to encourage... that greatest of all sexual transgressions, masturbation, the giving of one's seed to Moloch"), "was immediately embraced by Luther's own Augustinian Order... and came to shape basic Protestant attitudes on the subject".

Martin Luther argued that masturbation was immoral. He wrote that he, "... pitied those poor girls and young men who are tormented in the flesh at night." Mandatory priestly celibacy, Luther argued, "increased sin, shame, and scandal without end."

According to Deifelt, "... Luther frequently admonished Christians to keep the body under control... the Reformation gave rise to the modern, individualized body... for Luther the appropriate exercise of sexuality happened within the confines of marriage."

Luther saw masturbation as a sin more terrible than heterosexual rape since rape was "in accordance with nature" while masturbation was "unnatural". This was because he viewed masturbation (and coitus interruptus) to involve killing children before they have a chance to be born. Therefore, for him, masturbation was basically the same as abortion. Luther argued that the marital act is a way to avoid masturbation writing, "Nature never lets up...we are all driven to the secret sin. To say it crudely but honestly, if it doesn't go into a woman, it goes into your shirt."

Drawing on the Apostle Paul, he writes, ""For is it better to marry than to be aflame with passion." I have no doubt that everyone who wants to live chastely, though unmarried and without special grace for it, will understand these words and what they convey. For St. Paul is not speaking of secret matters, but of the common, known feeling of all those who live chastely outside of marriage but do not have the grace to accomplish it. For he ascribes this flaming with passion to all who live chastely but without the necessary grace, and prescribes no other medicine than marriage. If it were no so common or if there were none other advice to be given, he would not have recommended marriage. This thing is known in German as "the secret disease", but this expression would not be so common either if the ailment were truly rare...There can also be no doubt that those who have the grace of chastity still at times feel evil desires and are tempted. But it is transitory, therefore their problem is not this burning. In short, "aflame with passion" is the heat of the flesh, which rages without ceasing, and daily attraction to woman or to man; we find this wherever there is not desire and love for chastity. People without this heat are just as few and far between as are those who have God's grace for chastity. Now such heat is stronger in some, and weaker in others. Some among them suffer so severely that they masturbate. All these ought to be in the married estate...If they relieve themselves outside of marriage, then the pangs of conscience are soon there, and this is the most unbearable torment and the most miserable of earthly estates. This is the unavoidable result, that most of those who live without marriage and without grace in celibacy are forced to sin bodily in unchastity, and the others are forced to outward chastity and inward unchastity. The former must needs lead a damnable life, the latter an unholy useless one. And where are the spiritual and secular rulers who consider the plight of these poor souls? Every day they are helping the devil to increase this misery with their pressures and compulsion."

In his discussion of 1 Thessalonians 4:3–5 ("It is God's will that you should be sanctified: that you should avoid sexual immorality; that each of you should learn to control your own body in a way that is holy and honorable, not in passionate lust like the pagans, who do not know God;"), Luther advises, "All young people should...resolve to strengthen themselves against lust and sexual passions by reading and meditating on a psalm or some other portion of God's Word...If your sexual appetites continually tempt you, be patient. Resist them as long as necessary, even if it takes more than a year. But above all, keep praying! If you feel that you can't stand it any longer, pray that God will give you a devout spouse with whom you can live in harmony and true love...I have known many people who, because of their crude and shameful fantasies, indulged their passion with unrestrained lust. Because of their insatiable desires, they abandoned self control, and lapsed into terrible immorality. In the end, they had to endure dreadful punishment."

===== Seventeenth century =====
According to Aurélie Godefroy, Protestants treated masturbation much more seriously then Roman Catholics and, from the 1600s onwards, saw it as a major deviation.

===== Pietists =====
In 1740, the Halle Pietists, led by Georg Sarganeck, started a debate in Germany on masturbation that was to last into the nineteenth century and become a "Europe-wide obsession". Saganeck argued man had a will and therefore could control himself, that masturbation had bad health effects and was thus a slow suicide and that the practice could lead to the social order relapsing into "antisocial, bare lust".

===== Enlightenment =====
Immanuel Kant, (who was raised as a Pietist), argued that "...the question here is whether the human being is subject to a duty to himself with regard to this enjoyment, violation of which is a defiling (not merely a debasing)" of the humanity in his own person. The impetus to this pleasure is called carnal lust (or also simply lust). The vice engendered through it is called lewdness; the virtue with regard to this sensuous impulse is called chastity, which is to be represented here as a duty of the human being to himself. Lust is called unnatural if one is aroused to it not by a real object but by his imagining it, so that he himself creates one, contrary to [natural] purpose; for in this way imagination brings forth a desire contrary to nature's end, and indeed to an end even more important than that of love of life itself, since it aims at the preservation of the whole species and not only of the individual. That such an unnatural use (and so misuse) of one's sexual attribute is a violation of duty to oneself, and indeed one contrary to morality in its highest degree, occurs to everyone immediately, with the thought of it, and stirs up an aversion to this thought to such an extent that it is considered indecent even to call this vice by its proper name. But it is not so easy to produce a rational proof that unnatural, and even merely unpurposive, use of one's sexual attribute is inadmissible as being a violation of duty to oneself (and indeed, as far as its unnatural use is concerned, a violation in the highest degree). – The ground of proof is, indeed, that by it man surrenders his personality (throwing it away), since he uses himself merely as a means to satisfy an animal impulse. But this does not explain the high degree of violation of the humanity in one's own person by such a vice in its unnaturalness, which seems in terms of its form (the disposition it involves) to exceed even murdering oneself. It consists, then, in this...unnatural lust, makes man not only an object of enjoyment but, still further, a thing that is contrary to nature, that is, a loathsome object, and so deprives him of all respect for himself."

===== Nineteenth century =====
Im the United States, pastor and educator Sylvanus Stall wrote against masturbation in his book, What a Young Boy Ought to Know, in which he stated, "This sin is also... called “masturbation,” a word which is made from two Latin words which mean “to pollute by the hand”". He goes on to describe it as a sin of a "vile character".

===== Twentieth century =====
In the twentieth century, amongst Danish Lutherans, "... masturbation was called the "youthful sin"".

During the Weimar Republic period in Germany, there were Protestant societies for moral purity that opposed masturbation.

Likewise, in the Adenauer era, there was very strict sexual morality in the Church.

According to Brian F. Linnane, "until the twentieth century, the actual moral norms for sexual behavior were similar for both Protestants and Roman Catholics, although the justifications for these norms might...be quite dissimilar...For both groups, sexual expression was confined to lifetime, monogamous, heterosexual marriage. Premarital sex, adultery, homosexual relations, masturbation, and the use of birth control were all proscribed by the Christian churches". Rainer Brandes notes, "For a long time Protestant theology... placed sexuality exclusively at the service of reproduction."

However, at the end of the 1960s, German theologians set about redefining human sexuality. Siegfried Keil emerged as a leading figure in this movement but even he continued to oppose masturbation, seeing it as immoral.

This changed in 1971, when the Church published its "Denkschrift zu Fragen der Sexualethik" ("Memorandum on Issues of Sexual Ethics"), which took an extremely liberal position on masturbation. Sexologist Volkmar Sigusch claimed the positions in the memorandum read like they could have been written by liberal sex education teachers, rather than by pastors and theologians. Sigusch wrote, "Protestant ethics disqualifies most sexual relations the unmarried have today... [However] the attitudes of the Lutheran Church in Germany (EKD) memorandum on masturbation, contraception, [and] various sexual practices...are...largely liberal...Sexually deviant behaviors enjoy tolerance." Despite its liberalism, the 1971 memorandum still forbade sex outside of marriage, pornography usage and group sex.

In fact, at this time the faithful felt a growing alienation from the Church. They no longer turned to the church for advice on sexual morality but to doctors and sexual magazines. This was a dramatic shift from the 1950s, when the Churches had dominated the field of public and private morality in Germany. In the 1960s, theologians had been either criticised or respected by the media but they had been treated as important moral advisors. Now they were simply ignored. The liberalization of the theologians and the pastors however merely served to brand the views of the laity (who were generally much more conservative) as backward-looking and traditionalist.

===== Modern views =====
====== Germany ======
There has not been another memorandum on sexuality since 1971, despite an attempt to draft one between 2010 and 2015.

Currently, the "Church has no fundamental and current position on sexuality, including masturbation. While such a document was planned, its publication is not expected in the near future."

There are ongoing debates about sexual ethics between liberal and conservative pastors in the German church.

Liberal pastors Frank Muchlinsky and Maike Weiß of the EKD argue that masturbation is not a sin.

The Preußische Allgemeine Zeitung states, "it is clear that the churches in Germany have positioned themselves more left of center on important issues in recent years" and that "Protestant church conferences... often feel like Green Party meetings". They accuse the EKD of being "overly left-leaning... For example, Ralf Frisch, a Nuremberg professor of systematic theology, complained in the "Forum Church and Theology" that the EKD longs to "become a state-funded non-governmental organization, that is, a new form of state church." With their constant calls and commitments to demonstrations "against the right," church officials have sent the signal that "being Protestant means being left-green and seeing oneself as a tool of left-green politics...""

However EKD parishioners are generally more conservative than EKD pastors and theologians, in terms of their politics and on issues pertaining to sexual morality. Among Protestants, according to Preußische Allgemeine Zeitung, the AfD's support is around "26 percent, just behind the CDU/CSU (28 percent)". The newspaper notes, "It is striking that the Greens do not enjoy particularly high approval ratings among church members, receiving only between seven and 14 percent." A 2015 academic study found that, although Germany is a relatively sexually-liberal country and that young people's viewing of pornography is linked to masturbation, pornography use is lower amongst religious youth. The authors of the study found that, "...organizational religious activity was negatively associated with pornography use. Participants attending church or other religious meetings on a regular basis were older at their first exposure (weak association) and used pornography less often (strong association). This result confirmed findings from previous research on associations between religiosity and sexual behaviour: frequent attendance of religious services is generally related to greater sexual abstinence, fewer lifetime sexual partners, delayed age of sexual debut and lesser likelihood of premarital sex...We also found a negative relationship between non-organizational religious activity and current pornography engagement (relatively large effect). Spending time in private religious activities, such as prayer, meditation, or Bible study, was associated with lower frequency of pornography use in the last six months...In agreement with the findings in several previous studies...we found that religious attendance was negatively associated with pornography use."

A more conservative Lutheran denomination, Selbständige Evangelisch-Lutherische Kirche (SELK), believes that "sexual activity can only exist in marriage, not before it, not outside of it [...] marriage is the only way to address human nature, which is inherently oriented toward sexuality."

====== Scandinavia ======
The sexually-liberal Church of Sweden argues that masturbation is not a sin. The church's pastors frequently address the issue in confirmation classes for adolescents.

However, the "Värt att Vänta På" campaign conducted by a variety of churches, including the Church of Sweden, the Salvation Army's youth wing and the Pentecostal movement, aimed to combat the increasing sexualisation of Swedish society. It opposed masturbation declaring, "It is difficult to overcome oneself, but it is well worth it. Masturbation should be fought with friendship, work and prayer." The campaign was opposed by a Swedish sexologist, Maj-Briht Bergström-Walan, who argued that masturbation was natural and not sinful.

The Church of Norway is quite liberal but some parishioners, "... still adhere to strict rules regarding sexuality. Opinions are also divided among church leaders... Four percent... [believe]... that masturbation is always a sin."

The Evangelical Lutheran Church of Finland also has a positive view of masturbation, noting that it provides a secure approach to sex for single people by reducing the temptation to drift into promiscuity.

However, the Church of Denmark (Danske Folkekirke) teaches that masturbation is a sin. In the early 2000s, a controversial former pastor, Thorkild Grosbøll, who did not believe in a Creator God, "made other controversial statements about the interpretation of the Bible on several occasions. For example, the following: 'New studies show that masturbation is a preventative measure for testicular cancer. Should we tell little Per, "Now you can't masturbate because it's better to get testicular cancer than to do something the Bible says you shouldn't!?"'"

The conservative Danish Lutheran Inner Mission organisation states, "Masturbation is not mentioned as a specific sin in the Bible. When we evaluate the act from a Christian perspective, we must therefore see it in a larger context... [it is] a somewhat amputated form of sex, and this is perhaps why masturbation is associated with an immediate feeling of guilt for many people. However, it is also true to say that the Bible mentions several other sins very specifically that we should be at least as busy getting rid of: envy, greed, bitterness, etc." Their stance is clarified in two other articles: "Masturbation is not in itself a sin. But no action is "in itself", but is always connected to thoughts and motives that are more or less poisoned by our sinful basic attitude" and, "The Bible does not say that masturbation is a sin... [but it] can easily lead to some sin... It is actually difficult to masturbate "cleanly": that is, without having sexual fantasies at the same time..."

Another Inner Mission site says, "Masturbation (like sex) is fundamentally not sinful. But the thoughts that accompany it may well be... masturbation associated with porn is always sinful... The conclusion is that masturbation in itself is not sinful, but it can be if it is coupled with porn or thoughts about sex... Conscience is created by God, and it is generally a good indicator of whether what you are doing is right or wrong. But be aware that the conscience can be mistaken sometimes too if it is out of tune..." Expanding on this, elsewhere they say, "the Bible actually says does not say anything directly about masturbation. Therefore, there is no biblical basis for seeing the act of masturbating as wrong. On the other hand, the Bible is very clear that we should not have sexual thoughts about people we are not married to... Therefore, if you choose to masturbate, you should consider whether you are also fantasizing about another person..." and, "If you are a Christian, Jesus' counsel not to look lustfully at another person's wife (Matthew 5:28) means that you should not fantasize about having sex with her. More generally, Jesus is saying that you should not do anything even in your imagination that you would not do in physical reality."

====== Baltic States ======
The Lutheran churches in the Baltic states uphold traditional sexual ethics and therefore believe that masturbation is a sin.

====== France ======
Researcher Louise Chabanel interviewed French Protestants belonging to the Pietist tradition. She found that, "Evangelical norms of sexuality revolve around faithful and exclusive marriage and heterosexuality. The heteromarital framework is designated as the legitimate space for practicing one's sexuality, while outside of it, abstinence is required. The scope of the norm of abstinence is not always clear. Depending on the discourse, the prohibition applies only to sexual relations between partners, or to masturbation, the consumption of pornography, and sexual fantasies."

====== United States ======
In a 1993 draft statement, the liberal Evangelical Lutheran Church in America (ELCA) declared masturbation was "healthy".

The conservative Lutheran Church–Missouri Synod's Commission on Theology and Church Relations says the following regarding masturbation: "To view our sexuality in the context of a personal relationship of mutual love and commitment in marriage helps us to evaluate the practice. Chronic masturbation falls short of the Creator's intention for our use of the gift of sexuality, namely, that our sexual drives should be oriented toward communion with another person in the mutual love and commitment of marriage."

The conservative Wisconsin Evangelical Lutheran Synod has made the following declaration regarding masturbation: "Masturbation is self-stimulation to some form of arousal and climax. God gave sex as a gift and a blessing to human beings for marriage with a life-long partner of the opposite sex. Self-stimulation is a corruption of God's gift and blessing of sex."

====== Australia ======
Doctor John Kleinig, Lecturer Emeritus at the Australian Lutheran College, argues that, "The regular use of pornography for masturbation is a kind of sexual addiction. When Paul speaks about impurity and sexual greed as idolatry in Ephesians 5:3–7 and Colossians 3:5, he accurately describes how it works. It begins with sexual impurity, the defilement of our imagination by depictions of sexual intercourse that present naked bodies as idols for us to admire. Our fixation on these images arouses disordered desires and make us more and more greedy for sexual satisfaction from things that God has not given to us for our enjoyment. Yet they fail to satisfy us and serve only to feed our growing appetite for them... Where masturbation is involved...the more ashamed we become, the more secretive we become; the more secretive we become and the more we hide in the darkness, the more vulnerable we become to the accusation and condemnation of Satan... You need to be careful that Satan does not distort your perception by making a fool of you and getting you to focus on the wrong thing. Nowhere in the Bible is masturbation explicitly forbidden. There is good reason for this because the problem does not come from masturbation, which is in itself neither good or bad, but the adulterous sexual fantasies that accompany it, as Christ makes clear in Matthew 5:28. That's the problem spiritually!...That's how Satan gets a hold on us through our imagination. If you use pornography to masturbate, you put another woman, an idol that promises heaven and gives you hell, sexually, in the place of your wife. It arouses your greed for what you don't have, greed for what God has not given for you to enjoy, greed that increases as you give in to it. The more you indulge it, the more dissatisfied and empty you become."

==== Reformed (Continental Reformed, Presbyterian and Congregationalist) ====
===== Reformation =====
Karlsadt's views on celibacy and masturbation also directly influenced John Calvin and, thereby, the French Huguenots.

Calvinists were renowned for their moral rigor and strict adherence to their interpretation of Biblical standards of morality. Indeed, "Churches fashioned in the Calvinist tradition have typically set extremely high standard of behavior."

Calvin was strongly against masturbation. Nevertheless, Calvin taught that the Onan passage actually condemned coitus interruptus. In his Commentaries on Genesis (1554), Calvin teaches that "the voluntary spilling of semen outside of intercourse between a man and a woman is a monstrous thing. Deliberately to withdraw from coitus in order that semen may fall on the ground is double monstrous." Calvin does not denounce masturbation as a sin in the case of Onan. Rather, he "accuses Onan of "abortion before the fact". Calvin reasoned that by preventing the birth of a child, Onan was actively engaged in the sinful practice of abortion".

According to Humbert, "Protestants, by rediscovering the Bible, had brought up to date the Old Testament notions of the Jewish religion, and among them the requirement of purity... In the Calvinist exegesis of the Bible, children were affected from the moment of their birth by original sin, so that parents had to start early to give them a strict education on proper morals. In this context, it explains the insistence to eradicate the slightest caress observed, the least weakness, and this from the youngest age."

The Calvinists also unambiguously opposed "sexual touching" (including mutual masturbation) between unmarried parties, even if they are engaged to each other. This is because it is a form of fornication.

French Huguenot opposition to masturbation also drew on theological notions of self-control and the body as a temple which in turn emphasised bodily purity and modesty.

André Rivet wrote "every abuse of the seed, above all its voluntary spilling outside marriage, is a most grievous sin; and that one must beware of the suggestions of the impure spirit, by which Satan lies in wait for many in the age of adolescence and early puberty, inciting them to pollute and defile their own bodies, as hoopoes do their nests, with infamous softness, corrupting themselves and inflicting a grave wound on their conscience... Hence it is that the illustrious Scaliger, in his Letters, often calls the Jesuits “Onanites,” among whom he had heard that what the Apostle calls malakia, that is, softness or effeminacy, in 1 Corinthians 6:9, was frequent. Yet this was not properly the sin of Onan, except insofar as he spilled his seed on the ground. Therefore, those who by forbidden lust, or by violent abortions, destroy offspring before it is born, come closest to the crime of Onan, and bind themselves with the same kind of crime and guilt."

Franciscus Junius (the elder) wrote, "the disgrace of... Onan, is clearly shown in verse 9: that he voluntarily corrupted himself, lest he beget seed from Tamar his wife. And this corruption was, as we may conjecture from Moses’ words, what the impure poets among the Latins call masturbation."

However, masturbation rarely occupied church elders at consistories in mainland Europe in the 1600s. It is unknown if this is because it was rarely detected or if it was because it was not yet regarded a serious offence, as it was to become in the eighteenth and nineteenth centuries when society became fixated on it. Charles H. Parker agrees that, "Consistories were not much interested in private "vices" such as masturbation..."

The Swiss Calvinists had a frantic quest for purity, and regarded gratuitous sexual pleasure an abomination.

In the Netherlands, masturbation was considered a private or venial sin and was "punished by means of admonition on the part of the clergy or the "elders"."

British Reformed Christians considered masturbation a major deviation as early as the 17th century, as evidenced by the writings of the English Calvinist Richard Capel: "The pollution of oneself is the worst and most polluting of sins of impurity." Protestants at this time looked on masturbation much more seriously than Roman Catholics did.

Another English nonconformist, Richard Baxter, wrote that he also considered masturbation to be a sin.

Likewise Samuel Danforth condemned self-pollution as a sin.

The English attitude migrated with the Puritans to the early American colonies. In the United States, Puritans such as Cotton Mather saw masturbation as a sin.

An extreme example was the Puritan colony of New Haven in New England where masturbators, if caught, could expect the death penalty.

According to Godbeer and Winiarski, "New England ministers taught that sexual urges should be understood in terms of that larger moral drama in which each individual should be waging war against temptation to sin. They explained masturbation... just as they did any other sin, such as drunkenness or disobedience: they were all driven by the moral corruption that men and women inherited from Adam and Eve... New England's ministers condemned all nonmarital sex as immoral, unclean, and dangerous, yet they distinguished carefully between different kinds and degrees of offense."

===== Enlightenment =====
Calvin's views permeated Geneva and influenced the way Huguenots and Swiss Calvinists thought about masturbation. For instance, "For Rousseau the puritanical moralist and citizen of the theocratic republic founded by John Calvin, masturbation is exclusively the activity of an inflamed erotic imagination; it is not a legitimate or acceptable expression of sexuality, but a perverted and sterile self-indulgence that saps one's energies and destroys one's mental and physical health."

The Swiss Calvinist physician, Samuel-Auguste Tissot, undertook medical studies on the effects of masturbation that "reinforced the Judeo-Christian belief that masturbation was sin".

In the American colonies, the Puritan, Cotton Mather, preached that "self-pollution" was a sin.

===== Nineteenth century =====
In the United States, the influence of Puritanism on perceptions of female sexuality, including masturbation, was gradually eroded from the latter part of the eighteenth century and early nineteenth century onwards: "the birth control movement, the women's suffrage campaign, the Free love Movement, and finally the need for female labor in factories began to counterbalance the influence of John Calvin, the Mathers and "Mrs Grundy.""

By contrast, French Protestants felt "discomfort... with subjects of human sexuality" and, for example, preached against masturbation.

In the Netherlands, Willem Geesink wrote that, "When the sexual drive, which is not sinful in itself, becomes excessive and is no longer mastered by the will, it becomes an actual sin in the God-cursed act of fornication (1 Cor. 6:15-20)... No less clearly is this sinfulness manifested in unnatural sexual gratification, which is referred to as the “secret sin,” as self-defilement and less accurately termed Onanism (Gen. 38:8-9)."

Herman Bavinck wrote that, "the sin of masturbation is alarmingly on the rise. Contemporary culture, through various means and methods (such as provocative literature, cinema, photography), promotes the awakening of sensual desires."

Dutch Reformed denouncements of masturbation in the late nineteenth and early twentieth centuries were also linked to Calvinist opposition to neo-Malthusian ideology.

===== Modern views =====
====== France ======
The traditionalist Calvinist pastors of the United Protestant Church of France (EPUdf)'s Les Attestants group believe that masturbation is a sin, stating, "Masturbation...is not one of the prohibitions of God, so it can not be said that the Bible clearly defines masturbation as a sin. However, the Bible unquestionably presents the place of sexual life in the context of a committed and faithful couple (see Matthew 19:12). And it exhorts us to have our actions and thoughts meet this ideal. The masturbatory practice and the thoughts that may accompany it obviously do not correspond to this ideal, and are in this sense sin. Of course, we do not always answer the perfection to which God calls us...but to seek perfection is the call of the Christian, to give glory to God (1 Corinthians 6:20) because this is our vocation as men created in the image of God, and the way of life for today and in the perspective of eternity. Masturbation is not the act of an accomplished Christian, called to live the blessing of marriage and to fulfill his partner in this setting (1 Corinthians 7:5)."

According to the prominent Reformed pastor, Gilles Boucomont, "The Bible... says that sexuality is lived properly as part of a commitment, marriage. Outside of this context, sexuality is adultery if one is already married or sexual misconduct if one is not yet married. Misconduct and adultery break the unity that God wants for the married man and woman (1 Corinthians 6 and 7, Mark 10:1-12)..."

In contrast, a more liberal strand of EPUdf thinking is represented by the L'Oratoire du Louvre in Paris. According to its website, this parish believes that masturbation is not sinful, providing that the act is not done in a spirit of rebellion against God and providing that it does not become addictive.

Students trained at the conservative National Union of Protestant Reformed Evangelical Churches of France (UNEPREF)'s Faculté de Théologie Jean Calvin, such as psychologist Samuel Laurent and pastor Jérémie Cavin, argue that masturbation is sinful.

====== Switzerland ======
In the December 2011 edition of a Swiss Protestant magazine, La Vie Protestante, a sexologist, Juliette Buffat, criticises religions which "are the source of many negative ideas and prohibitions concerning this primitive sexual practice [masturbation]" and argues the Bible is silent on the subject and that Roman Catholic priests and Protestant pastors are at fault for interpreting the story of Onan in such a way that it condemns the activity.

The liberal Swiss Calvinist theologians Michel Cornuz, Carolina Costa and Jean-Charles Bichet have all said that masturbation is not a sin, provided that the use of pornography is not involved.

In contrast, Daniel Guex says that, "Masturbation is always accompanied by other things: thoughts, fantasies, ideas. It is the nature of these fantasies that needs to be questioned... I would say that it is not masturbation in itself that is sinful, but rather those obsessions that make us go around in circles and lead nowhere. If there is a fight to be waged, it would first be against this..."

====== Scotland ======
In a comment on his personal blog, the former Moderator of the Free Church of Scotland, David Robertson, argues that "masturbation is wrong – although not the massive sin that some want to make out. Why is it wrong? Because it is an abuse of the gift of sex that God has given us....I guess in theory you could argue that if you could do it without any lustful thoughts or fantasies then there might not be much problem...but in reality that is not normally the case."

====== Netherlands ======
The Protestant Church in the Netherlands' G. A. van Ginkel stated, when asked if it was sinful to masturbate if you are unmarried and you are fantasising about an unmarried girl, "What is all-important is that you see your body as not of yourself. Your life belongs to the Lord! Your body is a temple of the Holy Spirit. God hates uncleanness. That may sound harsh, but God's Word speaks clearly when it comes to that. It would be best if you could project your desire in sincere love and faithfulness to her that God gives you!...But there's a problem there. You do not have her. You are not married. And maybe you do not want a woman out of God's hand at all!? You want to project your sexual fantasy on an unmarried woman. In your mind "do it" with her. Focused on yourself. However understandable, this is not a good solution...You seek biblical legitimacy and believe it to be in the fact that the Bible does not speak about self-gratification. (The passage about the sin of Onan does indeed have nothing to do with self-gratification.) But the Bible does speak out about a holy and God-focused life. Paul writes to the church in Corinth: All that you do, do it to the glory of God. Thinking of this Word alone, you have no biblical legitimacy for your sexual projections. Pray for God on your side, with whom you may live life to the honor of His Name. This includes your sexual life! This is desirable!"

====== United States ======
In a 1991 report on human sexuality, the liberal Presbyterian Church (USA) declared that "churches need to repudiate historically damaging attitudes toward masturbation and replace them with positive affirmations of the role of masturbation in human sexuality".

The Tenth Presbyterian Church of Philadelphia, which is affiliated with the more conservative Presbyterian Church in America argues, in contrast with the PC USA, that masturbation is a sin.

The American conservative Calvinist website, Reformed Answers, argues that masturbation is only a sin if it entails lustful fantasies for someone other than the person's spouse: "...if an act of masturbation expresses the sin of lust, then that act of masturbation can be condemned as sinful. But this argument cannot condemn acts of masturbation that do not give expression to the sin of lust." The site notes that masturbation can only be opposed on moral grounds, not natural ones: "Some argue that masturbation is wrong on the basis of nature. That is, in a fashion similar to the argument based on Onan's sin, they argue that God did not design the human body and reproductive system to work in this manner, that God's general revelation in nature condemns the practice. This is a tenuous argument at best. In fact, there is some evidence to the contrary. For example, many human beings learn to masturbate without ever having been taught it or having heard about it. It would seem to be their "natural" impulse. Moreover, human beings are naturally equipped with the necessary body parts to accomplish masturbation (unlike most animals). It could be argued on these bases that it is natural. Moreover, most Protestants reject the idea that what is natural is necessarily what is good – especially in light of our "sin nature". This is simply a poor ground on which to base the argument against masturbation."

The American Reformed author, Jay E. Adams, argues that "masturbation is clearly wrong since it constitutes a perversion of the sexual act", citing 1 Corinthians 7:3–4 to support his argument.

Another American, Puritan Publications' C. Matthew McMahon, argues, "...if any form of sin is a product of lust, then it is an evil and wicked action. If a man masturbates while watching a sensual movie, then he has sinned. When masturbation grows out of a sense of this need for physical release due to unclean thoughts, it is sin. This is easily understood and biblically undeniable...Self-love, turning to lust, is at the heart of masturbation...Instead, the Christian man must set in motion an attitude of holiness and purity, instead of uncleanness and defilement. When he does this, he then "practices what he preaches". Though he says that holiness is right and good, he has to live that way as well. The question arises and must be answered "Is masturbation itself condemned?...Is it, in and of itself, a sin? I am biblically persuaded that masturbation...can only be achieved through lust".

McMahon also states, "The need for a Biblical treatment of lust and masturbation is necessary. Satan has conveniently disguised this "awful" topic as something that ought not to be mentioned, and never to be preached. The church's response to this is a deafening silence...The topic of lust may sometimes be alluded to, but never developed into the precise "doctrine" of the Bible's teaching on lust and masturbation, which really develops into a study on the fruit of the Spirit (love to Christ more than "self", and self-control)...Since we are in desperate need for Biblical teaching on this subject, we turn to the church to teach us what it means to be sexually pure. But, Christian men who struggle with this sin have little practical help from their local church."

James B. Nelson, a cleric in the United Church of Christ (a Congregationalist denomination) notes in his book, Embodiment: An Approach to Sexuality and Christian Theology, that, "The physiological intensity typical in masturbatory orgasm frequently surpasses that of intercourse, and relational fantasies usually accompany the act in compensation for the absence of the partner", implying this is a gift from God for those who lack a spouse.

Some articles on the Calvinistic Baptist John Piper's Desiring God website also argue that masturbation is a sin.

The Gospel Coalition's Brittany Allen argues, "Why would Paul encourage believers to get married for the sake of temptation if we could simply take care of our sexual desires ourselves (1 Cor. 7:1–2)? The logical conclusion is that masturbation is included in the biblical definition of sexual immorality."

The Orthodox Presbyterian Church (OPC) considers masturbation to be a sin.

====== Australia ======
In the August 1998 edition of the denomination's magazine, the Presbyterian Church of Australia stated, "Masturbation too would seem to be an assault on the Bible's teaching that sex is not a solitary exercise but to take place with one's married partner of the opposite sex (1 Cor. 7:9)."

The Christian Reformed Churches of Australia believe masturbation is a sin.

====== Wales ======
The Welsh Congregationalist minister, Martyn Lloyd-Jones, believed masturbation was a sin.

==== Anglicanism ====
"Until the 20th century, Anglican history and tradition related to the teaching... of how we are to regard ourselves as physical beings was very much in line with that of the rest of the Christian Church... Chastity was a virtue... Chastity meant more than merely maintaining one's virgin state; it meant full abstention from all sexual activity, including masturbation".

===== Eighteenth century =====
In the wake of the Glorious Revolution, anti-Catholic feeling in England was heightened. Masturbation was popularly associated with Catholicism and celibacy. However, there were also standard Anglican condemnations of masturbation as a form of "uncleanness" that was "subject to an absolute biblical injunction that could not be mitigated".

In the eighteenth century, ""Enthusiasts" and religious revivalists were regularly associated with the solitary vice of masturbation" by satirists.

===== Nineteenth century =====
The nineteenth century saw a heightened interest in the issue of masturbation. Rene Spitz and John and Robin Haller argue that this is possibly because of the Protestant culture's emphasis on individual responsibility for sin.

In the Victorian era, at the height of this anti-masturbation fervour, many clergymen believed it was the "pre-eminent male sexual perversion", as it was an "abuse of the chaste body" and because it provided a "sexual outlet outside of marriage". It symbolised being sexually out of control, "the very antithesis of normative Christian masculinity" and "threatened to dilute Christian maleness".

The eminent nineteenth century evangelical Anglican bishop, J. C. Ryle, discusses both masturbation and fornication simultaneously under the Seventh Commandment in his 1865 tract, Thoughts for Young Men. He writes, "For my own part, I feel it would be false and unscriptural delicacy, in addressing young men, not to speak of that which is pre-eminently "the young man's sin"... Read what our Lord says about it in Matthew 5:28. Be like holy Job: make "a covenant with your eyes" (Job 31:1)... Flee the thoughts of it; resist them, mortify them, pray against them—make any sacrifice rather than give way. Imagination is the hotbed where this sin is too often hatched. Guard your thoughts, and there is little fear about your deeds". Ryle notes, ""Flee youthful lusts"... [Paul] writes to Timothy (2Ti 2:22); get away from them as far as possible. Alas, how needful are such cautions!"

On the other side of Anglicanism Anglo-Catholicism, with its affinity with homosexual culture, owed much of its impetus to sexual sublimation by young male masturbators who redirected their repressed energies into ritualism and aesthetics and the promotion of celibacy, according to Robin Gilmour. Anglo-Catholics were often criticised by their Congregationalist and Evangelical Dissenter opponents for being effeminate, secretive and sexually non-normative. Professor David Hilliard has confirmed the close relationship between Anglo-Catholic religious orientation and homosexual identity.

Because of Anglo-Catholicism, Evangelical Anglicans feared that the, "Church had become weakened by a culture of effeminacy (Putney) which was closely associated to the two unmentionables of the Victorian period: masturbation and homosexuality (Dobre-Laza). It was hoped that "games and religious worship . . ." would ". . . offer the Muscular Christian substitute gratifications for sexual desire.""

Richard Pengelly notes that, among evangelical Anglicans, "Muscular Christianity was a movement that really got going in England in the mid-19th century and there were many factors behind this. Primarily the Industrial Revolution was well under way, and young men were flocking to the cities with time and money on their hands and they were getting involved in prostitution and gambling and drinking. And the Christian church that had been so suspicious of sport for so long, began to have some prominent thinkers like Charles Kingsley, and across the channel in the US, Dwight L. Moody, C.T. Stubbs, the great English cricket Captain, who started to say Well look, if we begin to see sport as a healthy pastime for these young men, as a way of teaching them the predominant values of their culture: working hard, self-sacrifice, in working for the team, and staying fit and healthy and out of the pubs and out of the brothels, then we can really promote a healthy society. So it becomes very, very organised in Church schools, you get the growth of the YMCA movement in the late 19th century, you get the Scouting movement beginning in the early 20th century and you then start to get Sports Chaplains emerging... Schools with a religious background have really cottoned on to sport, and... [sport]... is meant to control their sexual urges, particularly homosexuality and masturbation and that's written about in the 19th century."

Martyn Percy claims, "As late as 1866, the Archbishops of Canterbury and York were supportive of the surgical procedure of clitoridectomy as a means of controlling 'unruly female passions'."

===== Twentieth century =====
Percy notes, "Many senior Anglican clergy and both archbishops openly endorsed tracts written on the evils and degeneration of masturbation well into the Edwardian period and beyond."

In 1924, sexologists and psychologists at the Conference on Christian Politics, Economics, and Citizenship (COPEC) stated that masturbation was a "problem" caused by "thwarted sexual energy" and Anglican commentators began to draw on the ideas coming from these new fields of study.

In 1929 in Kenya, some missionaries caused controversy when they sought to have the practice of clitoridectomy outlawed.

In 1945, an Archbishop's Commission was appointed to study the issue of artificial human insemination. The resulting report, published in 1948, "discusses the legitimacy of masturbation in this context and concludes that although masturbation impairs the natural unity of the sexual act, its use as a last resort is justifiable. 'The act which produces the seminal fluid, being in this instance directed towards the completion (impossible without it) of the procreative end of the marriage, loses its character of self abuse. It cannot in this view, be the will of God that a husband and wife should remain childless merely because an act of this kind is required to promote conception.'"

In 1948, a writer for the Church Times said, "Masturbation is condemned by all Christian moralists because it implies the solitary and essentially individualistic use of sexual activities intended to be used in association. It disregards the truth that with these powers God provides physiological means for exercising them in a joint and common act."

In his letter to a Mr Masson dated 6 March 1956, C.S. Lewis wrote: "For me the real evil of masturbation would be that it takes an appetite which, in lawful use, leads the individual out of himself to complete (and correct) his own personality in that of another (and finally in children and even grandchildren) and turns it back; sends the man back into the prison of himself, there to keep a harem of imaginary brides...Masturbation involves this abuse of imagination in erotic matters (which I think bad in itself) and thereby encourages a similar abuse of it in all spheres. After all, almost the main work of life is to come out of our selves, out of the little dark prison we are all born in. Masturbation is to be avoided as all things are to be avoided which retard this process. The danger is that of coming to love the prison."

As a young man, the Scottish, liberal, Anglo-Catholic, former Bishop of Edinburgh, Richard Holloway, gave up masturbation because Christianity considers it a sin.

However later on, the liberal, Anglo-Catholic, mid-twentieth century Archbishop of Canterbury, Michael Ramsey, disliked the Roman Catholics' preoccupation with masturbation and thought it was "silly" of the Pope to make "such a fuss" over "something we all do". Likewise, another liberal Anglo-Catholic, Archbishop of Canterbury, Robert Runcie, denied it was a sin and made light of the activity.

In contrast, Ramsey's successor, the evangelical, Donald Coggan, considered masturbation to be a "problem" and critiqued a Roman Catholic statement on it for "being somewhat lacking in pastoral care and tenderness".

In 1958, the prominent British evangelical Anglican pastor and theologian, John Stott, argued that the range of acts forbidden by the Seventh Commandment included "solitary sexual experiences".

A June 2016 article in the Church Times quoted Thomas Szasz, stating, "that the sexual revolution of the 1960s dealt a crippling blow to the moral disapproval of masturbation".

===== Early twenty-first century =====
In 2002, the conservative, evangelical, former Archbishop of Canterbury, George Carey, argued, "Any sexual relationship beyond the confines of a heterosexual marriage is a deviation from Scripture". On another occasion he noted, "Severed from... [the] total commitment and personal intimacy [of marriage], sexual activity becomes potentially destructive, the source of untold pain, indignity and social breakdown". He thereby condemns cohabitation outside of marriage as well as other sexual activities outside of marriage including masturbation.

With regard to the views of Doctor Carey's successor as Archbishop of Canterbury, the liberal Anglo-Catholic Welshman, Rowan Williams, theologian Collin Cornell writes, "Masturbation, if it is wrong, is wrong because it is recursive. It fails to ramify communion between people. Similarly, in Rowan Williams' famous essay "The Body's Grace," the only sexual behaviors that receive criticism are those that are "asymmetrical"".

Williams himself stated, "Solitary sexual activity works at the level of release of tension and a particular localised physical pleasure; but insofar as it has nothing much to do with being perceived from beyond myself in a way that changes my self-awareness, it isn't of much interest for a discussion of sexuality as process and relation, and says little about grace."

In 2003, one of Williams' fellow liberals, Canon Bruce Saunders, said, "Masturbation is condemned in the Old Testament because the male semen is supposed to be sacred, it's very close to what the contemporary Roman Catholic doctrine about contraception is, wasted seed is taking life."

Later, another liberal clergyman, Peter Francis, argued that, "a modern reading is needed for Onan's supposed vice... It is time to move past literalistic readings of the Bible..."

In 2006, the charismatic Anglican founder of the Alpha Course, Nicky Gumbel, downplayed masturbation's sinfulness. He quoted, "A pastor who describes it as, "like biting our nails – something many do as part of growing up. It's not a good idea, but it should not be taken too seriously unless it becomes excessive"".

A May 2013 article in the Church of England Newspaper noted that, "Gordon Macdonald writes in When Men Think Private Thoughts, "that when men find themselves cut off from (true) intimacy, they are likely to struggle with temptations toward fantasy, masturbation, pornography, promiscuity and abuse". Like drinking salt water these activities never satisfy our real thirst for authentic intimacy."

A July 2014 article in the same newspaper argued that a, "Very narrow view of sin that gives too much attention to sexual sins [can get] an issue like masturbation out of proportion."

===== Modern views =====
Anglicans "generally treat masturbation as contrary to chastity and spiritually harmful, but official guidance comes more through pastoral and ascetical tradition than a single universal rule."

====== United Kingdom ======
The Church of England does not currently have a position on whether masturbation is a sin or not.

Samuel L. Perry argues that those evangelical Anglican ministers who do condemn masturbation as a sin today tend to do so through the prism of pietistic idealism instead of through Biblical teachings.

Robert Ian Williams, a Welsh author and former evangelical Anglican who converted to Roman Catholicism, is a prominent critic of the Anglicans' lack of a position on masturbation. On one occasion, he wrote damningly in the Church of England Newspaper that, today, "Most evangelicals... have no theology of marriage or sex. Even masturbation and contraception, once condemned, are not even issues."

On another occasion he noted that, nowadays, "Many Anglican books on sex and marriage advocate... masturbation and oral sex."

In November 2019, Christian Today criticised the Church of England's new Schools Charter, entitled Relationships, Sex and Health Education, which was "released in the midst of heated controversies over the teaching of gay relationships, transgenderism and masturbation to primary age children, with schools – and courts – refusing to bend to parent concerns." The article noted, "The Charter does not address these controversies directly... Perhaps most shocking for believers is how emphatic the Charter is that church schools will not teach as true the Christian teaching on marriage and sexual relationships. Instead of teaching 'only one moral position,' Church of England schools will seek to 'develop character within a moral framework'... the Church of England yet again misses the chance to offer support to Christians trying faithfully to hold out a biblical vision to a culture that so often doesn't want to know" and that, "This Charter is another reminder that the Church of England appears to have lost all confidence in its own biblical teaching, exchanging it for the thin gruel of progressive relativism..."

At the 2023 General Synod of the Church of England, a concern was raised that, "There have been recent media reports of organisations that continue to promote material for use in primary schools which is inappropriately sexual – including... encouraging masturbation..." The evangelical Bishop of Durham, Paul Butler replied, "... We treat the media reports with concern..."

====== Ireland ======
A January 2016 report by the liberal Church of Ireland's "Select Committee on Human Sexuality in the Context of Christian Belief" asks, with regard to Romans 1:26, "What are the 'degrading passions'? (v26) Reference to women does not necessarily refer to lesbianism. It could refer to other forms of non-procreative sexual acts with men. The spilling of semen for any non-procreative purpose − in coitus interruptus (Onan in Gen. 38.1`11), male homosexual acts or male masturbation − was seen as tantamount to murder. Wasting of 'the seed' was condemned in scripture in pre-scientific culture it was thought that it was the semen alone contained life. Women's bodies were merely the nurturing environment for life received from the male partner".

====== Australia ======
A Christian apologetics website sponsored by the conservative, Calvinist, Anglican Diocese of Sydney says that masturbation, "Can help us find sexual release when we cannot control our desire nor satisfy it through a marital relationship and in this sense it can be helpful". However, the Diocese notes that it can become associated with sin if it leads to either the consumption of pornography or to looking lustfully at people in real life in order to fuel fantasies. They warn that either of these can, in turn, suck someone into a cycle that cannot be controlled. The site goes on to note, "Jesus condemns looking at women or girls in order to lust after them. (Matt 5:28) So perving...which lots of 17 year old guys would treat as normal, is a sin and offends God. It's easy to get sucked into a cycle which fuels sexual desire to the point where it can't be controlled...When masturbation leads to unhelpful sexual thinking and lust you are sinning and need to do something about it. Make the conscious, aggressive decision to look somewhere else, or go somewhere else, or turn the computer off or whatever it takes! Jesus promises that when we are being tempted, he'll give us a way out. (1 Cor 10:13). Ultimately I think that it is much better to resist the temptation to masturbate." (The 1998 Lambeth Conference's Resolution I.10 says that the use of pornography is sinful and includes it in a list of the forms of sexual activity inherently contrary to the Christian way of life. Masturbation itself is not mentioned in the resolution at all, either in positive or negative terms.)

According to the Sydney Anglicans' Satisfaction and Singleness QandA document, the Sydney Anglican theologians Phillip Jensen, Keith Condie and Andrew Cameron argue masturbation is not a sin provided the act is not accompanied by sinful thoughts.

A podcast produced by the Sydney Anglicans' Moore Theological College discussed the matter further. According to the transcript: "The Bible never talks about masturbation. Now, I don't think we have just invented masturbation. I'm pretty sure that the Old Testament people were struggling with masturbation too. So I say that because I think it's very easy for us to want an answer that says, "Masturbation: no"—a kind of legalistic answer that just makes it very clear. But I actually think we have to do the harder work... and I think once we do that hard work—once we understand what God's purposes for sex is—when we understand that the world around us has a very different purpose for sex—the world around us says that sex is all about you; it's all about your gratification; it's all about your flourishing; it's all about your pleasure—then masturbation makes perfect sense in that world. But if we're looking at sex from God's perspective—what he's designed it for—which is to be other-person-centred and to be glorifying to him—then that changes the way that we think about this question about masturbation..."

Another Sydney Anglican-operated site also declares, "The Bible doesn't say anything directly about masturbation. This is vexing for many Christians, because we would have liked God to say something about such a common experience." The site raises concern about the alleged selfishness, lack of self-control and risk of pornography addiction and erectile dysfunction that may occur from the activity. However, it also notes there are limited circumstances in which the activity may be acceptable such as when a husband and wife are separated for long periods.

A Sydney deacon, Dani Treweek, says that "there are a variety of perspectives within the community". Doctor Treweek, "who has completed her PhD on singleness and Christianity, says that even though masturbation is a solo activity, it raises ethical issues. [Treweek notes that] "Jesus says in Matthew 5 that if a man looks on a woman who is not his wife lustfully, he's committing adultery in his heart, because sex is as much a matter of the heart and the mind as it is the body.""

In a podcast hosted by Moore Theological College, Doctor Treweek further stated, "... lust is a really serious issue. And it's an issue that often goes alongside masturbation. So many people find that it's just part and parcel of the process—that if you're seeking to arouse yourself—even if you're not viewing pornography, you might be thinking lustful thoughts in your mind. But also, you might find that it is actually gives rise to more lustful thoughts—that if you practise masturbation, that, far from sort of putting your sexual desire to bed, as it were, it might be one of those things that's actually fanning the flames. So I want to encourage you not to make it the sort of defining issue in your Christian life, but I do want to encourage you to watch especially what's happening in your mind—what's happening before, what's happening after—and to seek to avoid anything that generates lust for you."

An ABC News report notes, "Sexuality, which really begins at the end of the 19th century in various ways, and is in a sense part of the sort of medicalisation of society, so that increasingly things that had previously been seen as coming within the religious sphere, moved into the medical or the psychological sphere... Masturbation, that former gateway to numerous horrors, was now OK. What was abnormal was not having sex at all. Sex now became critically important for an individual's health and happiness." In the report, Bishop Bruce Wilson of the Anglican Diocese of Bathurst, a former sociologist, notes, "Orgasm has become a real substitute for religion, or religious experience, with many people... In itself orgasm is not salvation, but we I think have made it salvation because we repress and deny death."

The extremely liberal Anglo-Catholic Anglican Diocese of Brisbane removed the term "chaste" from its standards for church workers in 2022. The Diocese's Archbishop, Jeremy Greaves claimed to the The Australian "that language like chaste was unhelpful and archaic, and relationships "characterized by faithfulness and integrity" is a higher bar than "faithfulness in marriage." But conservatives said the rewording waters down the standards set for all church workers..." When the similarly-liberal Anglican Diocese of Perth followed suit in 2024, "those changes... caused some anger, notably in the conservative Diocese of Sydney. Archbishop Kanishka Raffel of Sydney told The Australian that such rewording would permit sex outside marriage. "Biblical standards have not changed, and yet one more diocese has changed the guidelines to permit sexual activity outside marriage, whether in heterosexual or homosexual relationships, and other sexually permissive practices. This is neither scriptural nor Anglican teachings," he said."

The evangelical Anglican Diocese of Tasmania expects unmarried clergy and church workers to maintain "chastity in singleness".

In 2025, an Australian Creed for Sexual Integrity was created. It states in part, "We believe God calls all people to the joy of living a chaste life, by celibacy in singleness and faithfulness in marriage, and that His commands are given for the common good. We believe sexual activities outside these bounds are sins which grieve God's heart, injure others, and enslave people to idolatry." Open to the general public to sign, Bishop Glenn Davies of the Diocese of the Southern Cross and Bishop Richard Condie of the Diocese of Tasmania were among the first to add their names to it, as did Catholic Bishop of Tasmania Julian Porteous, who stated, ""It was very much an initiative of Protestant churches... but I thought it was good ecumenically to show support."

The creed was created because, "Protestant denominations have splintered on [the issue of sexual ethics], some accepting progressive notions and others standing staunchly for what they describe as biblical truth. For the latter, the Australian Creed for Sexual Integrity provides a doctrinal mooring. It shows that their views are not just personal but biblically based and thoroughly traditional... Every era has its particular heresies. In the 21st century, heresies abound in the area of human sexuality. The church has not been immune to these errors. We believe the time has come for a new creed that affirms the timeless teachings of the church regarding sexual integrity, and that articulates God's glorious design for sex and marriage as revealed in Holy Scripture."

====== United States ======
The 1988 publication of the manual, Sexuality: A Divine Gift, A Sacramental Approach to Human Sexuality and Family Life, which approved of masturbation, caused a great deal of controversy among traditionalists in the Episcopalian Church.

Bishop John Shelby Spong of the progressive Christian movement argued masturbation was not a sin.

American theologian Anthony Costello notes, regarding Progressive Christianity and its rejection of the traditional prohibition on masturbation that, "All forms of social and political progressivism entail an explicit rejection of Jewish sexual ethics. There is no exception to this rule. It is foundational to every type of ideological progressivism. That being the case, the reaction by many in culture to Christian sexual ethics is inevitably a negative one... this loathing of biblical, sexual morality persists in spite of the obvious, social consequences the attitude itself engenders... Of course, the modern attempt to get around the immorality of acts like masturbation, is to make the typical, social theory assertion that any and all feelings associated with masturbation, or any other sexual sin– feelings usually of guilt and disgust at one's own thoughts and acts– are nothing but socially constructed impositions placed upon the social psyche by religion. This idea, one of history's greatest rationalizations, is the most virulent intellectual disease of contemporary, western culture."

====== Canada ======
The Church of Canada views masturbation as a sin.

In contrast, the liberal Bishop of New Westminster, Michael Ingham, argued it was not a sin and called for change in the church in 2007. "Bishop Ingham argued... that the church has been wrong for centuries on the notion that sex exists only for the purpose of procreation..."

====== Kenya ======
Masturbation is considered a "negative sexual behaviour" amongst Kenyan Anglicans.

====== Nigeria ======
The Church of Nigeria believes masturbation is a sin.

====== Uganda ======
The Church of Uganda believes masturbation is a sin.

====== Anglican Church in North America (ACNA) ======
Calvinist theologian J. I. Packer of the Anglican Church in North America, (a conservative Confessing Anglican denomination that is a member of GAFCON), considered masturbation to be a sin.

====== GAFCON ======
The members of the conservative GAFCON movement believe that masturbation is sinful. At a GAFCON conference in Uganda, Reverend Doctor Stephen Noll, Professor Emeritus of Biblical Studies at Trinity School for Ministry, described masturbation as one of a number of forms of "cheap sex" which have a variety of negative side effects such as leading, for instance, to a decline in marriage, the proliferation of pornography and the devaluation of children.

==== Evangelicalism ====
===== Twentieth century =====
In the 1940s, Evangelical Christian sex advice books advised against masturbation, considering it a very serious sin, but such warnings disappeared from the books during the 1960s, "because evangelicals who noticed that the Bible said nothing directly about masturbation believed that they had made a mistake to proscribe it." Also, they considered that masturbating is preferable to falling into "sex and drugs and rock 'n' roll".

In the late 1940s, Neo-Evangelicalism or New Evangelicalism emerged as a compromise between fundamentalists and liberals and "by the late 70s the change in evangelical morals could be documented. After surveys in Christian colleges it emerged that: young couples were engaging in sexual intercourse without guilt, profanity became acceptable, masturbation was called 'a gift from God', viewing pornography was tolerated, young girls had abortions and evangelical gay associations sprang up."

===== Modern views =====
====== United States ======
Dale B. Martin indicates that certain evangelical Christians today do not regard masturbation as a sin.

Two Evangelical scholars, Alex W. Kwee and David C. Hooper, addressed the issue in an academic paper. They note that "The Bible presents no clear theological ethic on masturbation...Of the many aspects of human sexuality that we address in our work, masturbation ranks as the most misunderstood for the lack of open, rational dialogue about this topic within the Christian community...Within evangelical frameworks of sexual ethics...there has never been a well-defined theological ethic of masturbation, in contrast to the ethics of pre-marital sex, marriage, and divorce that are worked out from foundational Christian anthropological assertions about gender, sexuality, and their relationship to the imago Dei...Masturbation falls thus within the proverbial grey area of evangelical sexual ethics." They go on to note that "we find that the questions that Christian young people ask about masturbation can be reduced to two essential queries. Christian youth want to know whether masturbation is "right or wrong" (i.e., what is the "correct" moral stance to take based on what the Bible says?), and whether masturbation is "normal" (i.e., what can we say about the psychological dimensions of masturbation?)" Answering the first question, they note that "The Bible does not directly address masturbation, leaving Christians to articulate a moral stance from various scriptures that in our view cannot support a deontological prohibition of masturbation...Today the general consensus in the Christian community is that Genesis 38:6–10 is irrelevant to masturbation. Modern readers of course understand Onan's act not as masturbation but as coitus interuptus. The technical designation of the act, however, is unimportant compared to the ethical violations manifesting through the act. The interpretive context for Genesis 38:6-10 is found in the ancient Israelite law (Deuteronomy 25:5–10)...Whatever his reasons for not consummating intercourse, Onan was punished for violating a specific Hebrew law and for failing in his covenantal duty to his deceased brother. Onan was judged for undisclosed but probably exploitative intentions...and certainly for his callous repudiation of his traditional obligations of familial care and responsibility." They state also that "Our...objection to using Matthew 5:27–30 as a basis for the blanket condemnation of masturbation is that such an interpretation can only be supported by de-contextualizing this passage from Jesus' overall message...[and]...proper contextual interpretation of Leviticus 15:16–18 would therefore support the view that masturbation in and of itself is morally neutral." They note that "There is a moral difference between masturbation done in the presence of pornography or the phone sex service (inherently selfish and exploitative mediums), and masturbation as the sexual expression of a fuller yearning for connectedness, i.e., connectedness that is not primarily sexual", concluding that "Scripture does not directly address masturbation, giving rise to guilt-inducing misconceptions about a behavior that is extremely salient to unmarried college-aged Christian men whose value system leads them to eschew pre-marital sex".

Evangelical pastors have pointed out that the practice has been erroneously associated with Onan by scholars, that it is not a sin if it is not practiced with fantasies or compulsively, and that it was useful in a married couple, if his or her partner did not have the same frequency of sexual needs.

According to one study, conservative Protestants today "often take a rather ambivalent view toward solo masturbation, especially if it is done without the aid of pornography... [as] the growing influence of psychology within evangelicalism heightened concern about pornography's harms while debunking myths associating masturbation with mental illness. These cultural influences provide "interpretive prisms" through which evangelicals differentially perceive the two issues, resulting in fervent anti-pornography activism and relative ambivalence toward masturbation".

On the other hand masturbation is believed to be forbidden by some evangelical pastors because of the sexual thoughts that may accompany it.

Likewise, evangelical theologian Anthony Costello argues, "If Jesus thought that lustful thoughts alone were akin to actually committing adultery with a woman not one's wife, then the inference to masturbation being sinful is hardly a stretch, especially considering what almost by necessity must go through the mind of a person who intends to carry out a masturbatory act."

Dennis Hollinger, the President Emeritus of the evangelical Gordon–Conwell Theological Seminary in the United States believes that sex was developed by God in for a specific purpose in a specific context and that "sex ought to occur only within the confines of marriage between a man and a woman, and ought to have procreation as part of its purpose and telos" and that masturbation violates this purpose and context.

====== France ======
French evangelical Protestants believe that masturbation is a sin. This is emphasised in church sex education classes.

The French charity, EnseigneMoi Canal International, argues that masturbation is a sin for a large variety of reasons. These include the following: "A feeling of secret shame, self-condemnation, guilt is almost always the consequence of masturbation... Masturbation violates the teaching of 1 Cor. 7:9, "For it is better to marry than to burn." If a young man practices masturbation, he tends to nullify a necessary and important motivation for marriage... Masturbation provides short-term relief. It increases rather than diminishes sexual urges to unite with another woman, real or imagined... As the apostle Paul pointed out in 1 Cor.10, if everything is permissible, not everything is useful and there is no question of allowing oneself to be enslaved by anything. Now, whoever indulges in masturbation enslaves himself to it. As Jesus pointed out, "whoever commits sin is a slave to sin" Jn.8:34."

====== Canada ======
Evangelicals in Quebec believe masturbation is a sin.

====== Germany ======
A study produced by Stephan Holthaus amd Johannes Vorherr of the evangelical Freie Theologische Akademie, entitled, Das Problem mit der Selbstbefriedigung, noted that many of the things that accompany masturbation, such as lustful thoughts, are sinful.

==== Methodism ====
===== Eighteenth Century =====
John Wesley, founder of Methodism, as quoted by Bryan C. Hodge, believed that "any waste of the semen in an unproductive sexual act, whether that should be in the form of masturbation or coitus interruptus, as in the case of Onan, destroyed the souls of the individuals who practice it". Wesley considered masturbation an unacceptable way to release "sexual tension". Like his contemporaries, he believed that many people had become badly sick and even died because of "habitual masturbation". He argued that "nervous disorders, even madness, could be caused by another form of bodily excess – masturbation." He wrote his Thoughts on the Sin of Onan (1767), which was reproduced as A Word to Whom it May Concern in 1779, as an attempt to censor a work by Samuel-Auguste Tissot. In that document, Wesley warned about "the dangers of self pollution", these being the bad physical and mental effects of masturbation, records many such cases along with the treatment recommendations.

===== Modern views =====
====== United States ======
The United Methodist Church does not have an official position on masturbation.

Dale Kaufman, a clergyman in the Free Methodist Church, teaches:

Solitary masturbation is not an act which harms the individual's body (and in fact, the release of sexual tension can promote the wellbeing of the body), nor does it involve the joining of one body and spirit to another as is the case with sexual intercourse. Through the releasing of sexual tensions, it can act as a barrier to seeking release through immoral outlets. A part of honoring God with our bodies is doing whatever's necessary to keep our bodies under control – and in the area of sexuality, masturbation can be an effective way of doing so...It's imperative that we let them know that masturbation can and should be used as a viable, God-honoring way to deal with the stresses of their newly acquired sexuality. With a sex-saturated society all around us, we as parents, youth pastors, and other caring adults, need to give our young men and women the ability to live godly lives in the midst of a perverse culture. Masturbation, within the Biblical boundaries, helps give them that ability.

====== Australia ======
The liberal Uniting Church in Australia teaches that "masturbation is an important part of childhood and adolescent discovery and sexual development. It should not be stigmatised." However, the Church has long been wracked by controversies and divisions over sexuality. "The Church's Interim Report on Sexuality...was released in May 1996. It became arguably the most explosive document in the UCA's short history. The report was bound to be controversial for some given it spoke positively about the ordination of homosexual ministers, suggested pre-marital sex was not 'living in sin' and described masturbation as a "natural sexual activity (which) can be a positive experience". Not only did it attract much debate from within the Church but also from the mainstream media, which covered it – and the fallout – extensively. In the following months Crosslight [the Uniting Church's magazine] was flooded with letters of complaint about the report and its authors...The Church received more than 8000 responses to the report with almost 90 per cent – representing the views of 21,000 members – negative."

During the debates, former Assembly of Confessing Congregations chair Rev Dr Max Champion "argued that any proposal to change the Church's current position...needed to be grounded in theology, something he did not believe had occurred...Dr Champion said he believed there had been a shift in thinking from some within the Church who had moved away [from Biblical positions]...to arguing for diversity to be the main theological base."

==== Pentecostalism ====
===== United States =====
The Texan Pentecostal pastor and church founder, Tom Brown, has written on the subject of "Is Masturbation a Sin?", stating that "Masturbation has been around for a long time, and since God does not clearly condemn it, I would not be too bothered with it, either. Masturbation is practiced far more than adultery or fornication, yet God is practically silent on the issue. This ought to tell you that God is not overly concerned with it...However, let me caution you against addiction to masturbation. Just like most things, masturbation can turn into an addiction...Paul said, "'Everything is permissible for me' – but I will not be mastered by anything" (1 Cor 6:12). This includes masturbation. Also, you should never use pornography to masturbate...Concerning single people, I have no advice other than a prohibition [on] pornography."

He goes on to note, "If a believer uses masturbation to alleviate sexual temptation, that's far better than actually being tempted to commit fornication or adultery. I would rather have a man masturbate than go to a prostitute...Another thought, if masturbation is sinful, then you would expect there to be bad health consequences to it, such as found in adultery, homosexuality, and fornication (diseases for one thing). Instead, research has found that masturbation serves to release sexual tension."

In an article on an Assemblies of God website, it is noted, "Very few books on Christian sexuality deal with masturbation — even though the perspective is very diverse as to what God's will is on the issue. Opinion ranges from, "It is always a sin and contrary to the will of God" to "It is a necessary part of the single experience and a gift from God." This confuses singles, and they do not know who to listen to or trust on this topic." The article ultimately concludes masturbation is a "problem" to be conquered.

===== Scandinavia =====
A Swedish Pentecostal pastor, Christian Mölk, says that the Bible does not explicitly mention masturbation as a sin. He notes that Onan's sin was about failing to do his duty under the Levirate law mentioned in Deu 25:5-6. Under this law it was "the closest brother's duty to ensure that his family survived by marrying the widow. When Onan "spilled his seed on the earth", it means that he refused to get a seed to his brother and instead utilized his brother's widow for his own sexual pleasure." He goes on to note that another text which is sometimes invoked is Matthew 5:27–30. Here, he says, Jesus is simply warning that it is not only wrong to cheat in one's action but also that it is wrong to cheat in one's heart. Therefore a person should not look with lustful intent at someone else's wife. He says these texts are not about masturbation and that the Bible does not explicitly mention that masturbation is a sin.

Another Swedish Pentecostal, Christer Åberg, has written about the practice on a Welsh language site. He states, "First of all, nowhere is masturbation discussed in the Bible...But is masturbation a sin? As I understand it, it is not a sin. The answer is "no". But it can lead to sin, so, therefore, I think one should be careful with it. I mean if a guy masturbates and fantasizes with desire for a girl, it will be wrong...It's really like everything: It's not a sin to drink alcohol, but it can lead to sin if you drink yourself drunk. Nor is it a sin to dance, but it can lead to sin, etc., etc. The Bible says that "Everything is legal to me, but not everything is beneficial. Everything is granted to me, but I will not let anything take power over me." (1 Corinthians 06:12)." In a follow-up article, he wrote, "Some time ago, I wrote an article about masturbating and surprised some. I wrote that it was not too bad to masturbate, but it could lead to sin. Maybe the best advice in today's society is to help with masturbation. I think of an article in the Expressen newspaper about a "masturbation competition". This is a clear example that it can open you up to an evil influence, and lead you to sin. We live in a time when it is important to lead a clean and devoted life to Jesus Christ. For you, live near Jesus so that you do not risk going wrong. And then you will have no interest to try the things of this "good" world".

===== Australia =====
Hillsong Church believes that masturbation is a sin if it is accompanied by sexual fantasies.

===== Kenya =====
Masturbation is considered a sin by Kenyans in the Assemblies of God denomination.

==== Anabaptists ====
A 2011 article in Canadian Mennonite magazine notes the development of Anabaptist views towards sexuality and goes on to state that "Masturbation is one of the most common sexual experiences across the spectrums of age, culture, partnered and single life situations, and genders...Finding pleasure in our own God-given bodies can be good...[but] if it draws someone away from God, then for God's sake, don't do it. But we ought to release the stranglehold of guilt formerly associated with the practice of self-pleasuring." (The article also argues that Anabaptists should commit themselves to avoiding pornography for a wide variety of reasons).

==== Baptists ====
Southern Baptist Convention cleric David Platt in the Baptist Press declared that masturbation "goes against the design of God" and that "God designed sex to be relational; masturbation is lustful". The Baptist publication characterized masturbation as "isolating, noncommittal and self-centered".

Masturbation was one of the most common acts people wrote about to Billy Graham. A small minority of correspondents saw it as a God-given gift but most writers felt it was a sin and sought advice from Graham on how to overcome the practice.

The British Baptist pastor, Robert Irvine, argues from 1 Corinthians 7:2-5 that, "God's plan for sex requires a relationship, namely, that of a husband and wife. Masturbation is sex disconnected from any relationship as it is carried out by a single person. Foundational to God's plan for sex is giving one's body to another. The husband gives his body to his wife, and vice versa. But masturbation is keeping one's body to oneself, and lastly he solution to a time of deprivation is to "come together." Masturbation is done alone, not together. Again, marriage is the God-given outlet for sexual yearnings... Corinthians 7:9 identifies the proper outlet for single people who struggle with sexual desire: "If they cannot control themselves, they should marry, for it is better to marry than to burn with passion." Paul suggests that self-control is the best avenue. To those singles who lack self-control, Paul does not say, "Let them masturbate"; he says, "Let them marry." Again, marriage is the God-given outlet for sexual yearnings."

==== Quakers ====
In 1960, the British Friends Home Service published a pamphlet on marriage that was read and approved on both sides of the Atlantic that stated that "Masturbation as a child is healthy, but not as an adult." However, four years later, in 1964, the Quaker physician, Dr. Mary Calderone, argued for the emerging view that masturbation was a normal useful means for "relieving natural tension in a healthy and satisfying way".

More recently, some Quakers, while formulating a testimony on sexual intimacy, have noted that "one possibility for a testimony of intimacy is a pronatalist position that is focused on the imperative to have children. This is a long-standing position of the Roman Catholic Church and a teaching that has considerable sway among many Protestant Evangelicals...In this teaching, [the] main purpose [of sex] is procreation...In this pronatalism, masturbation is...wrong, as is contraception, but there are no clear scriptural texts against these practices. Their prohibition is taken to follow from the central teaching that the purpose of sex is the creation of legitimate offspring...For several reasons, Friends are likely to feel uncomfortable with this pronatalist framing of the morality of intimate relationships. For many Friends, the most serious objection of all...would be pronatalism's steadfast focus on increasing the population. With seven billion human beings alive today on planet Earth, further population increase should hardly be the predominant emphasis informing relationships of intimacy. Yet the central warp thread of this teaching is the urgency of procreation."

==== Seventh Day Adventists ====
Ellen G. White, one of the founders of the Seventh-day Adventist Church, in the mid-19th century said she had spiritual visions from God that gave her guidance on the Christian life. She warned against overly-stimulating foods, sex, and masturbation, which she referred to as "solitary vice". She warned her followers of her visions of disfigured humans and the consequences of masturbation not only destroying one's life, but preventing access to Heaven when Jesus comes in the first resurrection. She said that masturbation was the cause of many sicknesses in adults from cancer to lung disease. White even stated that masturbation claimed many sinners' lives prematurely. She believed that one's diet had a direct correlation with one's urge to masturbate. She said that a healthy diet consisting of fruits, vegetables, wheat breads, and water would lead to a diminished urge to masturbate and thus would lead to a healthier and more fulfilling life. To ultimately produce a guide for future generations she said solitary vice was the cause of hereditary insanity, cancer, and other deadly diseases; clearly appealing to parents to protect their children by not engaging in solitary vice.

A 2023 article on the AdventistToday.org website argues that, "None of the biblical authors and redactors mention masturbation explicitly. Modern-day exegetes have done their own midrash on Matthew 5:27-28, arguing that masturbation is necessarily preceded by lust from mental visualization or pornography." The article concludes, "There are no easy answers here, but it seems to me that masturbation as a horrible religious and physical defilement was an exaggeration of the 18th century that has neither a solid religious nor scientific foundation. Unfortunately, this view remains embedded in our collective religious psyche."

Adventist Youth Ministries has declared, "Does the Bible say anything about whether or not masturbation is wrong? No. However, it does point out that God's gift of sex is often misused by the world, and that God desires for us to be pure" and "... masturbation isn't something Christian young people should be involved in..."

=== Interdenominational ===
In 1994, members of the Christian Medical Fellowship – an ecumenical organization of Christian doctors from various traditions (Catholic, Lutheran, Anglican, Orthodox, Reformed, Moravian, nondenominational, etc.) debated in a journal article whether or not masturbation is a sin.

Psychologist James Dobson, the founder of Focus on the Family, a Christian lobbying organization centered around moralism, has stated: "Christian people have different opinions about how God views this act. Unfortunately, I can't speak directly for God on this subject, since His Holy Word, the Bible, is silent on this point." He also stated: "The Bible says nothing about masturbation, so we don't really know what God thinks about it. My opinion is that He doesn't make a big issue of it." He also stated "Despite terrifying warnings given to young people historically, it does not cause blindness, weakness, mental retardation, or any other physical problem. If it did, the entire male population and about half of females would be blind, weak, simpleminded, and sick."

Others make a distinction between masturbation and sexual fantasy. Richard D. Dobbins proposes that it is permissible for teenagers to fantasize about their future spouse during masturbation.

Garry H. Strauss, a psychologist counseling the students at Biola University in the United States, wrote that there is no mention of masturbation in the Bible, therefore masturbation is permissible, but pornography and sexual fantasies are not permissible.

The therapist Judith K. Balswick, in her book, Authentic Human Sexuality: An Integrated Christian Approach, argues that "Masturbation can be a healthy, enjoyable way for a person without a sexual partner to experience sexual gratification."

In the book, Singles Ask: Answers to Questions about Relationships and Sexuality, by Howard Ivan Smith, the Fuller Theological Seminary-affiliated clinical psychologist Archibald Hart is quoted as saying that, "I do not believe that masturbation itself is morally wrong, or...sinful."

The Australian ecumenical group, Access Ministries, which provided chaplains to Victorian schools via the National Schools Chaplaincy Program, received negative publicity in the 2010s due, in part, to its opposition to masturbation. In response, the organisation rebranded itself as Korus Connect.

Cru believes "masturbation falls short of God's design for us sexually and is, therefore, something we should avoid."

The Christian Research Institute argues that it is a sin.

=== Non-denominational ===
Given that non-denominational Christian churches are not connected with one another, different congregations take varying positions towards masturbation, with some viewing it as sinful and other churches viewing it as a healthy expression of God-given human sexuality.

The eighteenth century saw the "growing popularity of proscriptive literature which increasingly denounced the sin of Onan, associated particularly, but not only, with male masturbation. The earliest English-language example of this type of literature was Rebuke of the Sin of Uncleanness by Josiah Woodward, which was published by the Society for the Promotion of Christian Knowledge (SPCK)."

In modern times, the Australian non-denominational Christian teen sex education website, Boys Under Attack, argues that masturbation is not a sin, provided that it does not become addictive, does not involve the use of pornography and is done alone, not with another person or group of people. The site refers to teachings by James Dobson and an American Lutheran pastor on the matter.

Journalists for Ekklesia, a Nigerian non-denominational Christian magazine, argue that masturbation is a sin: "Masturbation (sex with self or auto sex) is usually carried out with the intention of releasing tension and getting sexual satisfaction without "sinning" with another person. Apart from the fact that it violates a basic rule of sex which is genital union, masturbation is often in response to a sexual fantasy. That sexual fantasy could be borne out of exposure to pornographic materials. We learn from Philippians 4:8 on how we are to use our minds. Within that context, masturbation qualifies to be called a sin...Finally, as with every other sin, masturbation leads to spiritual weakness and loss of intimacy with God."

Ray Bohlin of the non-denominational Probe Ministries argues masturbation is a sin because it falls within the Biblically-condemned category of sex outside of marriage.

The Australian non-denominational site, Christian Today argues masturbation is a sin.

The Australian Christian Lobby believes masturbation is a sin. An ACL member spoke out against a school education program that "taught children how to masturbate".

The Questions.org website, part of the non-denominational Our Daily Bread Ministries, notes that, "The fact that the Bible doesn't specifically mention masturbation implies that we should approach this topic with sensitivity and caution... Jesus made it clear that sexual sin isn't limited to physical act. Sin occurs equally in fantasy and imagination... Sexual fantasy can be a destructive expression of rage, revenge, or lust. Such unhealthy fantasies can scar and harden our hearts even if they aren't carried out in the real world."

The Study and Obey website argues that masturbation is sinful.

Harvest USA argues it is a sin.

The Association of Certified Biblical Counsellors believes it is a sin.

=== Restorationism ===
A Church of Christ in Tulsa, United States, claims that "Masturbation is not mentioned in the Bible and isn't the same thing as sexual immorality. The historical church has had difficulty explaining this practice, but there is no good reason to lump it with sexual immorality and heap guilt on single people in particular...For most males and females, masturbation is a natural part of self exploration. However, masturbation can program us to think sex can be done alone. Coupled with pornography, we get two steps away from married sexual love...The warning is for masturbation not to become an obsession that impacts your conscience, future sex life, and leads you into fantasizing with pornography."

==== Jehovah's Witnesses ====
The Jehovah's Witnesses teach that masturbation is a habit that is a "form of uncleanness", one that "fosters attitudes that can be mentally corrupting".

==== The Church of Jesus Christ of Latter-day Saints ====
On many occasions spanning over a century, leaders of The Church of Jesus Christ of Latter-day Saints (LDS Church) have taught that adherents should not masturbate as part of obedience to the code of conduct known as the law of chastity. The Church places great emphasis on the law of chastity, and a commitment to following these sexual standards is required for baptism, receiving and maintaining a temple recommend, and is part of the temple endowment ceremony covenants devout participants promise by oath to keep. While serving as church president, Spencer W. Kimball taught that the law of chastity includes "masturbation...and every hidden and secret sin and all unholy and impure thoughts and practices." Before serving full-time missions, young adults are required to abandon the practice as it is believed to be a gateway sin that dulls sensitivity to the guidance of the Holy Ghost. The first recorded public mention of masturbation by a general church leader to a broad audience was in 1952 by apostle J. Reuben Clark, and recent notable mentions include ones in 2013 and 2016.

Though rhetoric has softened and become less direct, one 1976 study found that the majority of Latter-day Saints' views are at odds with those of top church leaders. However, the prohibition on masturbation remains in place, though its enforcement and the opinions of local leadership vary. During regular worthiness interviews, Latter-day Saints – including teenagers – are encouraged to confess any serious sins (including sexual sins) to a church leader, to help them repent and be worthy to participate in the sacrament and temple rites. Some have even reported being asked specifically about their masturbation habits.

==== Armstrongism ====
The United Church of God, an Armstrongnite church, believes that "sexual love is the supreme expression of love between a husband and wife and that only this use of the sexual organs glorifies or reflects God's design and purpose." The church also says that, according to 1 Corinthians 6:16, 18, any sexual activity outside of marriage is sinful and that according to Matthew 5:27–30, sexually arousing thoughts alone are enough for a person to be guilty of such sin. The church encourages its members to "guard and control their thoughts, as well as their actions".

== See also ==
- Christian views on birth control
- Christian views on divorce
- Theology of the body
- Religious views on masturbation

== Bibliography ==
- Gold, Michael (2001). "Raising sexually responsible children". Does God Belong in the Bedroom?. Varda Books. p. 195. ISBN 978-1-59045-127-4. "Despite the many rabbinic passages about the evil of spilling seed in vain, it is difficult to find a single source for the prohibition in the Torah. The story of Onan (Gen. 38), often cited as the source, involves the more serious biblical sin of evading levirate marriage obligations. Rabbi David Feldman brings a number of possible sources for the law.^{17} The difficulty of pinpointing a biblical source seems to indicate that this is a rabbinic prohibition based on the rabbis' own sense of propriety."
- Wile, Douglas (1992). Art of the Bedchamber: The Chinese Sexual Yoga Classics Including Women's Solo Meditation Texts. G – Reference, Information and Interdisciplinary Subjects Series. State University of New York Press. ISBN 978-0-7914-0885-8.
- Kwee, Alex W.; Hoover, David C. (2008). "Theologically-Informed Education about Masturbation: A Male Sexual Health Perspective" (PDF). Journal of Psychology and Theology. 36 (4): 258–269. doi:10.1177/009164710803600402. ISSN 0091-6471. S2CID 142040707. Archived (PDF) from the original on 6 February 2012. "The Bible presents no clear theological ethic on masturbation, leaving many young unmarried Christians with confusion and guilt around their sexuality."
- Harvey, John F. "The Pastoral Problem of Masturbation" (PDF). couragerc.org. Archived from the original (PDF) on 22 December 2014.
- Dobson, James (2012) [1978]. Preparing for Adolescence: How to Survive the Coming Years of Change (Ebook ed.). Grand Rapids, Michigan: Revell. p. 50. ISBN 978-1-4412-2483-5. Archived from the original on 15 August 2021. "Still, the subject of masturbation is a very controversial one. Christian people have different opinions about how God views this act. Unfortunately, I can't speak directly for God on this subject, since His Holy Word, the Bible, is silent on this point. I will tell you what I believe although I certainly do not want to contradict what your parents or your pastor believe. It is my opinion that masturbation is not much of an issue with God. It's a normal part of adolescence, which involves no one else. It does not cause diseases, it does not produce babies, and Jesus did not mention it in the Bible. I'm not telling you to masturbate, and I hope you won't feel the need for it. But if you do, it is my opinion that you should not struggle with guilt over it."
- Dobson, James C. (2000). Preparing for Adolescence: Growth Guide. Delight, AR: Gospel Light. ISBN 978-0-8307-2502-1. Archived from the original on 15 August 2021. "The Bible says nothing about masturbation, so we don't really know what God thinks about it. My opinion is that He doesn't make a big issue of it. It won't cause you to become crazy, as some people say. So I would encourage you not to struggle with guilt..."
