= Stalling =

Stalling or Stallings can refer to:

- Meanings derived from the term "stall", see Stall (disambiguation)
  - Stalling (behavior)

Stalling refers to the act of intentionally delaying or postponing an action, task, or decision, often to avoid or defer the associated responsibility or effort. This behavior can manifest in various contexts, including work, relationships, and personal commitments. Stalling may involve making excuses, offering vague responses, or simply avoiding action altogether.

== People ==
- Stalling (surname)
- Stallings (surname)

== Places ==
- Stallings, North Carolina, a town in North Carolina
- Stallings Field, an airport in North Carolina, USA
- Stallings Island, an archeological site in Georgia with shell mounds

== Science and computing ==
- Stall (fluid dynamics), in aviation and fluid dynamics, a sudden reduction in lift from exceeding a foil's critical angle of attack (such as when a plane climbs too steeply and slowly)
- Compressor stall, in jet-engine aviation
- Stalling (gaming), obstruction of the flow of play while leading in a timed game
- Pipeline stall, in computing
- Stallings theorem about ends of groups, a theorem by John R. Stallings
