= Stallings (surname) =

Stallings is a surname. Notable people with this surname include:

- A. E. Stallings (born 1968), American poet and translator
- Ben Stallings (born 1987), American professional football fullback
- Bill Stallings (1962–2010), American professional soccer forward
- Dennis Stallings (born 1974), American former professional football player
- Don Stallings (born 1938), American professional football defensive lineman
- Earl Stallings (1916–2006), American Baptist minister and activist in the Civil Rights Movement
- Felix Stallings Jr. (born 1971), American DJ and record producer
- Fran Stallings (born 1943), American storyteller
- Gene Stallings (born 1935), former American college and professional football coach
- George Stallings (1867–1929), American baseball player and manager
- George Augustus Stallings Jr. (born 1948), American priest
- George B. Stallings Jr. (1918–2018), American politician
- Henry Stallings II (1950–2015), American politician
- Jack Stallings (1931–2018), American college baseball coach
- Jacob Stallings (born 1989), American professional baseball catcher, son of Kevin Stallings
- Jami Stallings (born ca. 1987), Miss Indiana USA 2007
- Jane Stallings (1929–2016), American academic
- Jesse F. Stallings (1856–1928), American politician
- Jim Stallings, American musician
- John R. Stallings (1935–2008), American mathematician
- Kay Wilson Stallings, American television executive and producer
- Kevin Stallings (born 1960), former American college basketball coach, father of Jacob Stallings
- Larry Stallings (born 1941), American former professional football player
- Laurence Stallings (1894–1968), American writer
- Louise Stallings (1890–1966), American soprano, sister of Udell H. Stallings
- Mary Stallings (born 1939), American jazz vocalist
- Mary Stallings Coleman (1914–2001), Michigan Supreme Court justice
- Patricia Stallings (born 1964 or 1965), American wrongfully convicted of murder
- Ramondo Stallings (born 1971), American professional football player
- Raymond Stallings McLain (1890–1954), Lieutenant General, United States Army
- Richard H. Stallings (1940–2025), American politician
- Robert S. Stallings (1927—2012), American politician
- Ron Stallings (born 1983), American mixed martial artist
- Scott Stallings (born 1985), American professional golfer
- Sonny Stallings (born 1947), American politician
- Tre' Stallings (born 1983), American former professional football player
- Udell H. Stallings (1899–1966), American college football and baseball player and coah, brother of Louise Stallings
- Vernon Stallings (1891–1963), American animation director and writer
- William Stallings, American author who writes on computers and technology
- William S. Stallings, see Bill Stallings

== See also ==
- Stalling (surname)
