= Stollings (surname) =

Stollings is a surname. Notable people with the surname include:

- Marlene Stollings (born 1975), American basketball coach
- Ron Stollings (born 1955), American politician

== See also ==
- Stallings (surname)
- Stollings (disambiguation)
