= Stall =

Stall may refer to:

== Enclosures ==
- Animal stall, an enclosure for an animal
- Restroom stall, an enclosure providing privacy to the user of a single toilet in a public restroom
- Market stall, a makeshift or mobile structures for selling market goods or serving food
- Choir stall, seating in a church for the choir
- Stalls (theatre), the ground floor seats in a theatre/cinema (closer to or directly in front of the stage)

== Science and computing ==
- Stall (engine), the unexpected or unwanted stopping of an engine
- Stall (fluid dynamics), the fairly sudden loss of effectiveness of an aerodynamic surface
- Compressor stall, the sudden loss of compression in a jet engine
- Pipeline stall, in computing

== Places ==
- Stall, Austria, a town in the district of Spittal an der Drau in Carinthia

== People ==
- Sylvanus Stall (1847–1915), American pastor

== Art and entertainment ==
- The Stall (Seinfeld), a TV episode
- "Stall", a 1997 song by Sarge

== See also ==
- Stalling (disambiguation)
