= Stollings =

Stollings may refer to:

- Stollings, West Virginia, US
- Stollings (surname)
