= John F. Harvey =

Founder of the DeSales School Theology

John Francis Harvey
- Born: April 14, 1918
- Died: December 27, 2010 (aged 92)
- Occupation: Roman Catholic priest

John Francis Harvey OSFS (April 14, 1918 – December 27, 2010) was an American Catholic priest, a moral theologian, an educator and the founder of the DeSales School Theology in Washington, DC.

Harvey founded the Courage Apostolate, an official Catholic organization that counsels same-sex attracted Catholics to help them remain abstinent from same-sex sexual activities.

His opinions and ideas were expressed in written works in his effort to help the question of homosexuality in the Church conflicting with moral, Catholic teaching.

== Early life and ordination ==
Harvey was born on April 14, 1918, in Philadelphia, Pennsylvania, the third of four children of Patrick J. and Margaret (née Harkins) Harvey. Patrick Harvey, a devout Catholic, was a native of Ireland. Margaret died when John Francis was three years old.

He attended St. Columba Parish School, and after graduating from Northeast Catholic High School for Boys in 1936, he entered the Oblate Novitiate in Childs, Maryland. He made first profession of vows on September 8, 1937, and his perpetual vows on September 8, 1940. After earning his Bachelor of Arts degree in philosophy in 1941 from The Catholic University of America in Washington, DC, he continued his studies at that institution, earning a masters in psychology and philosophy, a licentiate in theology, and, ten years later, a doctorate in moral theology.

He was ordained to the priesthood of the Oblates of St. Francis de Sales on June 3, 1944, at the Cathedral Basilica of SS. Peter and Paul in Philadelphia by Hugh L. Lamb, Auxiliary Bishop of Philadelphia.

Harvey was a lifelong fan of the Philadelphia Eagles and Phillies.

== Priestly ministries ==
=== Educational and ministerial career ===
After ordination, Harvey worked as an English teacher at Northeast Catholic High School from 1945 to 1947. He became a professor of moral theology at Dunbarton College of the Holy Cross and worked there from 1948 to 1973. He also acted as a professor of moral theology at DeSales Hall School of Theology, Washington, DC from the somewhat overlapping period of 1949 to 1987. He served as that school's president from 1965 to 1977.

He was a professor of moral theology, and president, of Cluster of Independent Theological Schools in Washington, DC (DeSales Hall School of Theology, Dominican House of Studies and Oblate College) from 1980 to 1983. During this time he also served as a visiting professor at several institutions, including Catholic Theological Union in Sydney, Australia, the St. Joseph Seminary of the Archdiocese of New York, and Seton Hall University in New Jersey.

From 1990 to 2010 he was a professor of medical and sexual ethics at the Allentown College of St. Francis de Sales (since 2001, DeSales University). He took on teaching duties at the Oblate House of Studies at The Catholic University of America, in Washington, D.C. until it was closed in 1997 due to a lack of candidates for the priesthood.

=== Courage Apostolate ===
Harvey is best known for urging the Catholics he called "same-sex attracted" to be chaste. The term "same-sex attracted" is often preferred by Catholics like him because they feel "gay" or "lesbian" is defining a person by their orientation inadvisably.

In November 1978, Fr. Benedict Groeschel, C.F.R, recommended him to Cardinal Terence Cooke, Archbishop of New York, to start a new ministry for this purpose. Harvey started Courage Apostolate, a support group with five members. It had its first meeting on September 26, 1980, at the Church of St. Joseph in New York.

Harvey retired as executive director of Courage in 2008.

== Publications and reception ==
In his writings, Harvey defended the traditional Catholic position on sexuality, while strongly contending that same sex attracted or LGBT Catholics deserve compassionate pastoral care. In 1987, he published his best-known book, The Homosexual Person: New Thinking in Pastoral Care. In it, he critiqued the views of those theologians who argue that the Church's longstanding prohibition of same-sex acts is wrong. Among others, he also wrote two other books on the subject, The Truth about Homosexuality, and Homosexuality and the Catholic Church.

Harvey's position on same-sex attraction has been praised by both Catholic commentators and high-ranking officials in the Catholic Church: in a foreword to Homosexuality and the Catholic Church, Archbishop Raymond Burke expressed approval of Courage support groups, stating that "Father Harvey helps us all to think more clearly and to act more rightly and lovingly in responding to our brothers and sisters with same-sex attraction."

He has also faced criticism for his statements about the Catholic Church's sexual abuse scandal. In 2018, the Catholic newspaper Crux reported Harvey advocated for the return of abusive priests to ministry in the 1990s because these priests should be treated with the same compassion and forgiveness deserving of all same-sex attracted individuals. In 1992, Crisis Magazine interviewed Harvey about remarks he made at a U.S. Bishops' Workshop in 1990, where he argued that "most [priests who sexually abuse minors] should be rehabilitated and returned to ministry".

== Retirement and death ==
Harvey retired to Annecy Hall, a retirement community for the Oblates of St. Francis de Sales in Childs, Maryland, in January 2010. He died on December 27, 2010, at Union Hospital in Elkton, Maryland, and was survived by his sister, Margaret Smith, and an extended family. He was buried on December 31, 2010, at the Oblates of Saint Francis de Sales Cemetery, in Childs, Cecil County, Maryland.

== Legacy ==
Harvey's approach won the endorsement of the Pontifical Council for the Family. Pope John Paul II said of this ministry, "Courage is doing the work of God!".

In 2011, at the 31st Annual Courage Conference, Raymond Leo Cardinal Burke, then the Cardinal Prefect of the Supreme Tribunal of the Apostolic Signatura, gave a tribute to the work of Harvey.

=== Honorary degrees ===
- Doctorate of Humane Letters (Honorary), Assumption College, 1986.
- Doctorate of Humane Letters (Honorary), Allentown College of St. Francis de Sales (now DeSales University), 1988.

=== Other recognition ===
- Harvey was the Lineacre Quarterly writer of the year in 1984.
- A chair in moral theology at DeSales University is named after Harvey.
- A residential building for juniors and seniors at DeSales University was named for Harvey.
- Harvey was inducted into the Northeast Catholic Alumni Association's Hall of Fame in 2026.

=== Cause for Canonization ===
Before and after Harvey's death in 2010, there was widespread recognition and appreciation of his life and ministry. In 2023, the Father John Harvey Guild was officially established to promote the opening of Harvey’s cause for beatification and canonization.

== Selected works ==
- Harvey, John F. (2009) [1951]. Moral Theology of 'The Confessions' of Saint Augustine (Doctoral thesis). Washington D.C.: Catholic University of America Press. ISBN 978-1606084236.
- Harvey, John F. (1977), John R. Cavannagh (ed.), Counselling the Homosexual, Huntington, IN: Our Sunday Visitor, ISBN 978-0879737610
- Harvey, John F.; May, William E. (1978), On Understanding Human Sexuality, Cincinnati, OH: Franciscan Press, ISBN 978-0819907202
- Harvey, John F. (1979), A Spiritual Plan to Redirect One's Life: For Today's Homosexual, Boston, MA: Pauline Books & Media, ISBN 978-0819869326
- Harvey, John F., ed. (1987), The Homosexual Person: New Thinking in Pastoral Care, San Francisco, CA: Ignatius Press, ISBN 978-0898701692
- Harvey, John F.; DiIenno, Joseph A.; Smith, Herbert F. (1989), Homosexuality: The Questions; Scriptural, Church & Psychiatric Answers, Boston, MA: Daughters of St. Paul, an imprint of Pauline Books and Media, ISBN 978-0819833327
- Harvey, John F. (1996), The Truth about Homosexuality: The Cry of the Faithful, San Francisco, CA: Ignatius Press, ISBN 978-0898705836
- Harvey, John F.; Bradley, Gerard V., eds. (2003), Same Sex Attraction: A Parents' Guide, South Bend, IN: St. Augustine Press, ISBN 978-1587317514
- Harvey, John F. (2007), Homosexuality & the Catholic Church: Clear Answers to Difficult Questions, West Chester, PA: Ascension Press, ISBN 978-1932927627
- Harvey, John F. (2007), Fr. Gabriel B. O'Donnell, O.P. (ed.), Same Sex Attraction: Catholic Teaching and Pastoral Practice (PDF), New Haven, CT: Knights of Columbus Supreme Council, ISBN 978-2-35389-402-4

== See also ==
- Courage International
