= Louise Stallings =

American soprano singer

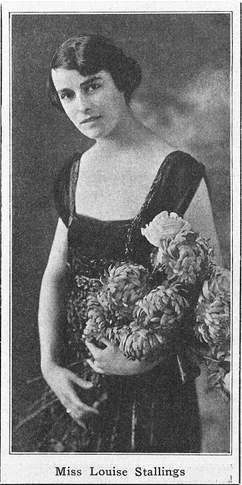
Louise Stallings, from a 1919 publication.

Louise Stallings (December 31, 1890 – March 2, 1966) was an American soprano singer.

== Early life ==
Louise Belle Stallings was from Alton, Illinois, the daughter of William Henry Stallings and Barbara Alice Warderman Stallings. One of her brothers was college football coach Udell H. Stallings. She attended Shurtleff College and studied voice with Lena Doria Devine in New York City.

== Career ==
Louise Stallings toured on the Chautauqua circuit with the Boston Opera Singers Company. When Stallings gave a recital at New York's Aeolian Hall in 1921, the New York Times commented that she was "dark and slender, dowered by nature with a low sweet voice, whose honeyed quality would be cloying but for her varied use of it in modest amounts." She made some recordings, and was a popular singer on radio in the 1920s. "I have a feeling of great responsibility when I sing in a radio studio," she explained, "I feel that I must do extra well for all the millions who listen." In the late 1920s she trained for opera, encouraged by Emma Calvé, and appeared in Martha with the touring Festival Opera Company in 1929. In 1932, she gave concerts in the Virgin Islands.

== Personal life ==
Stallings mentioned having a Swedenborgian religious affiliation. She married Robert D. Morgan in New York City. In widowhood, she moved to St. Petersburg, Florida. She remarried in 1956, to James E. Revelle. She was widowed again when he died. Louise Stallings Revelle died in 1966, aged 75 years.
