= Udell H. Stallings =

American football and baseball player and coach

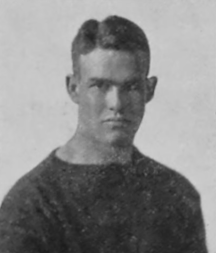

Biographical details
- Born: May 27, 1899; Alhambra, Illinois, U.S.
- Died: February 11, 1980 (aged 80); Glen Ridge, New Jersey, U.S.

Playing career

Football
- 1918–1921: Oberlin
- Position: Tackle

Coaching career (HC unless noted)

Football
- 1922–1923: Oberlin
- 1924: Stevens

Baseball
- 1927–1928: Stevens

Administrative career (AD unless noted)
- 1936–1966: Newark Academy

Head coaching record
- Overall: 8–14 (baseball)

Udell Harrison Stallings (May 27, 1899 – February 11, 1980) was an American college football and baseball player and coach. He served as the co-head football coach with Lawrence McPhee at Oberlin College from 1922 to 1923 and the head football coach at Stevens Institute of Technology in 1924. He was also the head baseball coach at Stevens Tech from 1927 to 1928, tallying a mark of 8–14. Stallings was the athletic director at Newark Academy in Livingston, New Jersey from 1936 until his retirement in 1966.

He died at Mountainside Hospital in Glen Ridge, New Jersey on February 11, 1980.

His sister was concert singer Louise Stallings.
