= Bill Stallings =

American soccer player

Personal information
- Full name: William Stephen Stallings, Jr.
- Date of birth: December 20, 1962
- Place of birth: St. Louis, Missouri, United States
- Date of death: August 12, 2010 (aged 47)
- Place of death: Webster Groves, Missouri, United States
- Position: Forward

Youth career
- 1981–1984: SIU Edwardsville Cougars

Senior career*
Years	Team	Apps	(Gls)
1985–1986	St. Louis Steamers (indoor)	28	(6)
1986–1987	Fort Wayne Flames (indoor)	10	(1)
- * Club domestic league appearances and goals

William S. Stallings was an American soccer forward who played professionally in the Major Indoor Soccer League and American Indoor Soccer Association. After leaving professional soccer, he worked as a real estate developer in St. Louis, Missouri.

Stallings graduated from Rosary High School in St. Louis, Missouri. He attended Southern Illinois University Edwardsville where he played on the men's soccer team from 1981 to 1984. He was a 1984 Third Team All American and led the team in scoring in 1983 and 1984.

In June 1985, the St. Louis Steamers selected Stallings in the first round of the Major Indoor Soccer League draft. He played one season for the Steamers before being released. He then played ten games with the Fort Wayne Flames of the American Indoor Soccer Association during the 1986–1987 season before retiring from professional soccer.

== Retirement ==
Stallings became an agent for the Bureau of Alcohol, Tobacco, and Firearms (ATF). After two years working drug and firearms cases, Stallings left the ATF.

He returned to St. Louis in 1989 and became a real estate developer in partnership with his father. He was instrumental in the renovation of the Chase Park Plaza in 1999 but was also convicted twice for financial misconduct; on the second occasion he served two months in federal prison. In November 2002 an unidentified person fired three bullets at Stallings' home in St. Louis. Stallings died in his sleep on August 12, 2010.
