= Stalling (surname) =

Stalling is a surname. Notable people with this surname include:

- Carl W. Stalling (1891–1972), American composer
- Jonathan Stalling (born 1975), American poet and academic
- Max Stalling (born 1966), American country music singer/songwriter

== See also ==
- Stallings (surname)
