= Dietrich Coelde =

German Franciscan missionary

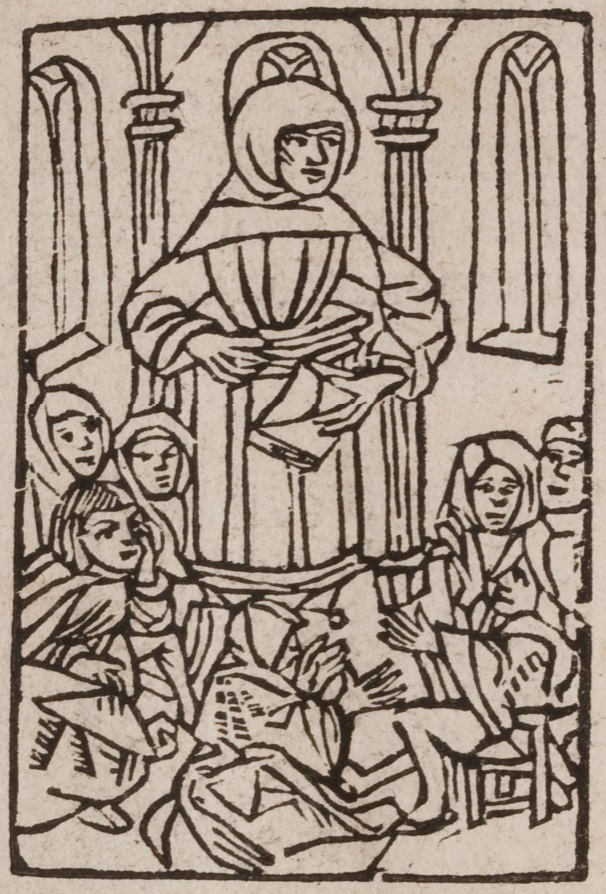

Dietrich Coelde (1435 – 11 December 1515) was a German Franciscan hermit and missionary.

== Life ==
Coelde was born at Münster, made his first studies at Cologne, and entered the Order of the Hermits of St. Augustine at an early age. In 1454 he was received into the Franciscan Order in the Netherlands. When the plague broke out at Brussels in 1489, Coelde ministered to the dying. Before the end of the plague, more than thirty-two thousand people had received the last rites from him. Coelde died at Leuven, aged 80. In 1618 his remains were exhumed, and, after the suppression of the Franciscan convent at Leuven, were transferred to Sint-Truiden, where they now repose behind the high altar.

== Works ==
In 1470, Coelde composed a brief, popular treatise on the Catholic Faith, entitled "Kerstenspiegel" or "Christenspiegel" (The Christian's Mirror). This is considered to be the first German catechism. It went through thirty-two editions in Low German and two in High German, and came to be used throughout Germany and the Netherlands as the principal work of popular instruction in religious matters. At the request of his friend and admirer, Hermann of Wied, he wrote a series of meditations on the sufferings of Christ, which appeared probably about the same time as the "Christenspiegel".
