= Christer Åberg =

Swedish evangelist, blogger and writer

- Born: Hans Christer Nilsson; April 23, 1964 (age 62)
- Occupations: Blogger, author, musician
- Spouse: Marie Åberg (married 2004–2008; widower)
- Website: apg29.nu

Hans Christer Åberg (born April 23, 1964, in Saltsjöbaden, Stockholm County ) is a Swedish evangelist, blogger and author. He is known for his blog site apg29.nu.

== Biography ==
Åberg was left by his parents in orphanages. He later came to a foster family where he felt unwelcome and describes his school days as dark himself. At the age of 20, he was "saved" and had a strong experience of being seen by God and has since served as an evangelist. Among other things, he has performed together with the singer-evangelist Nenne Lindberg and his team and has regularly appeared on the channel Himlen TV7.

In 2001, he started the blog site Apg29 which has had more than a million views. The site has been criticized for anti-Islam content. The site has also attracted attention for criticizing the Roman Catholic Church and The Church of Jesus Christ of Latter-day Saints as well as Jehovah's Witnesses for deed doctrine.

In 2016, Åberg published his first book, the autobiographical The Longest Night. The book is about how his heavily pregnant wife and newborn son died of amniocentesis in 2008. In 2020, Åberg published his second autobiographical book, The Unwanted, which is about his upbringing.

=== Family ===
Christer Åberg married Marie Åberg (2004–1964) in 9, with whom he had a daughter (born 2006) and a son (born and died 2008).

== Bibliography ==
- 2016 – Den längsta natten (in Swedish). Värnamo: Semnos förlag. ISBN 9789187827501. LIBRIS: 19821377.
- 2020 – Den oönskade: oönskad av människor - önskad av Gud (in Swedish). Värnamo: Tell it publishing. ISBN 9789198629910. LIBRIS: 8mkqdml06z8cn4tg.
