= Sylvanus Stall =

American Lutheran pastor (1847–1915)

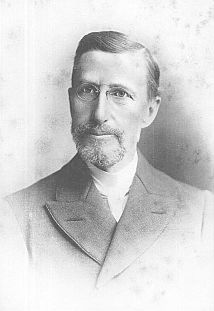
- Author photo from With The Children On Sundays (1911)
- Born: October 18, 1847; Elizaville, New York
- Died: November 6, 1915 (aged 68); Atlantic City, New Jersey
- Citizenship: United States
- Education: Doctor of Divinity
- Occupation: Pastor
- Parent(s): William J. Stall and Caroline Tinklepaugh Stall
- Writing career
- Language: English
- Genres: Religion, Health

Sylvanus Stall (18 October 1847 – 6 November 1915) was a United States Lutheran pastor, most famous for his 1897 sex education and anti-masturbation book What A Young Boy Ought To Know and its many sequels.

Stall was born in Elizaville, New York (now part of Gallatin). In 1866 he entered Hartwick Seminary, then Pennsylvania State University and the Union Theological Seminary in New York City. He was ordained a minister in 1874.

Stall held a Doctor of Divinity degree. He was initially a pastor in Cobleskill, New York (1874–77), Martins Creek, Pennsylvania (1877–80) and Lancaster, Pennsylvania (1880–87) (including running a Sunday School attended by H. L. Mencken), but quit in 1887 to edit a church newspaper, The Lutheran Observer, and start writing books. He also produced Stall's Lutheran Year-Book from 1884 on. He was also statistical secretary of the Lutheran General Synod from 1885.

After several small-selling books, he released the enormously popular What A Young Boy Ought To Know, a book on sexual hygiene, warning young boys of the purported dangers of masturbation. The book was a transcript of a series of sermons Stall recorded on Edison wax phonograph cylinders, so is divided into "cylinders" rather than chapters. A cylinder collection was also offered for sale; Loompanics described this as possibly being the first audiobook.

He died in Atlantic City on 6 November 1915, aged 68.

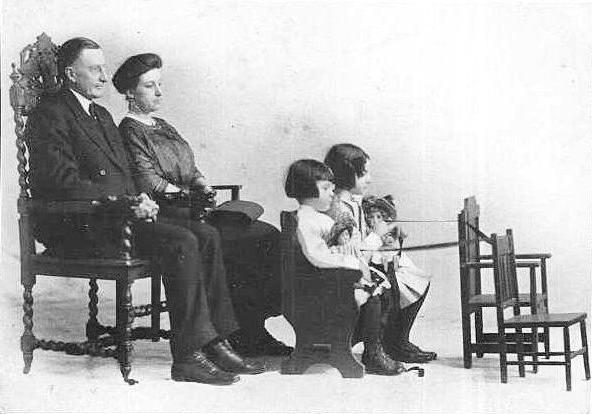
Dr Stall, his daughter and his grandchildren, from With The Children On Sundays, 1911.

== Bibliography ==
- Pastor's Record (1876)
- Hand-Book to Lutheran Hymns (1879)
- How to pay church debts, and how to keep churches out of debt (I. K. Funk, 1881)
- Methods of church work: religious, social and financial (Funk & Wagnalls, 1888)
- Five minute object sermons to children: ... through eye-gate and ear-gate into the city of child-soul (Funk & Wagnalls, 1894)
- Bible selections for daily devotion; 365 readings (Funk & Wagnalls, 1896)
- What a Young Boy Ought to Know (Vir, 1897)
- What a Young Husband Ought to Know (Vir, 1899)
- What a Man of Forty-five Ought to Know (Vir, 1901)
- What a Young Man Ought to Know (Vir, 1904)
- The Social Peril (Vir, 1905)
- Successful selling of the Self & Sex series (Vir, 1907)
- Talks to the King's children: being the second series of "Object Sermons to Children" (Vir, 1907)
- With the children on Sundays, through eye-gate and ear-gate into the city of child-soul (Uplift, 1911)

With Dr. Mary Wood-Allen:

- What a young girl ought to know (1897)
