= Harvey (name) =

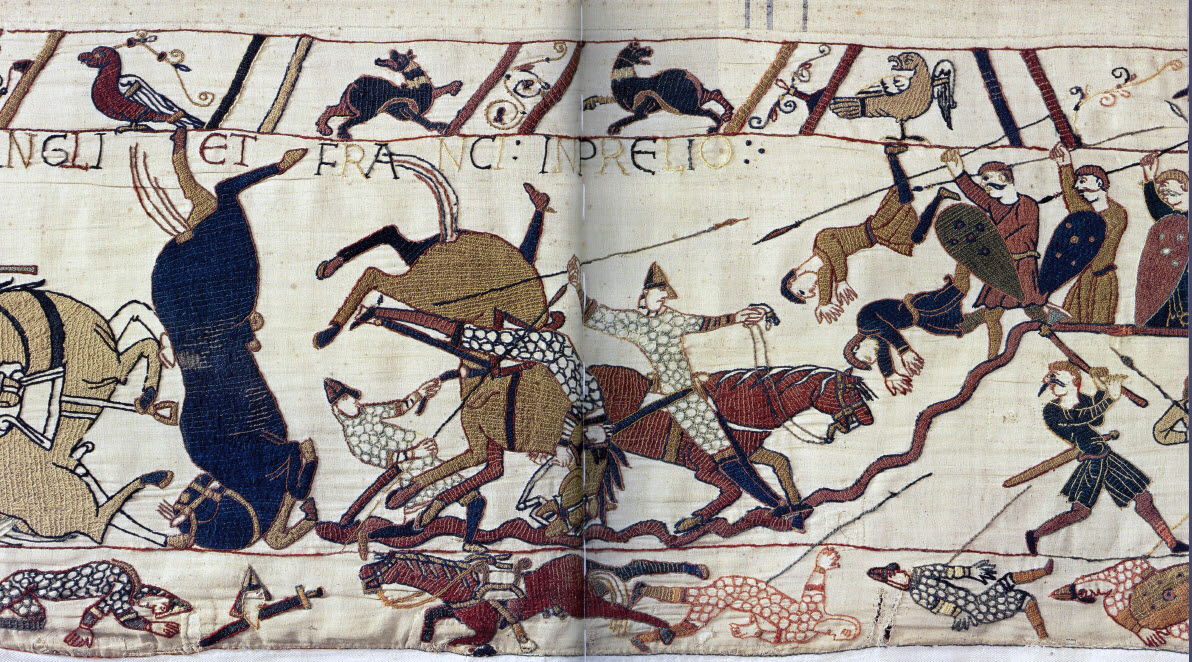
- The Battle of Hastings as depicted by the Bayeux Tapestry
- Pronunciation: /ˈhɑːrvi/
- Language: English

Origin
- Language: Breton
- Meaning: 'Battle worthy', 'blazing iron'
- Region of origin: Brittany

Other names
- Variant forms: Hervey, Hervie, Harvie, Harry
- Pet name: Harv
- Related names: Hervé

Harvey is an English and Scottish family and given name derived from the Old Breton personal name Huiarnviu (or Aeruiu), derived from the elements hoiarn, huiarn (modern Breton houarn) meaning "iron" and viu (Breton bev) meaning "blazing". An alternative elemental derivation has been theorized in which origination is from haer + vy meaning "battle/carnage worthy". It is related to Old Welsh Haarnbiu. An altogether separate origin in Ireland has been theorized where Harvey is an anglicization of the Gaelic personal name Ó hAirmheadhaigh, which is itself possibly related to the name of a mythical physician, Airmheadh.

== Surname ==
- Harvey (surname)

== Given name ==
- Saint Hervé (Saint Harvey), 6th-century Breton saint
- Harvey Allen (disambiguation), various people
- Harvey J. Alter, American medical researcher, virologist, physician and Nobel Prize laureate
- Harvey Ball, creator of the smiley face
- Harvey Barnes (born 1997), English footballer
- Harvey Bennett (disambiguation), various people
- Harvey Brooks (disambiguation), various people
- Harvey Brown (disambiguation), various people
- Harvey Bullock (disambiguation), various people
- Harvey Campbell (disambiguation), various people
- Harvey Carignan, serial killer known as the Want-Ad Killer
- Harvey Catchings, American basketball player
- Harvey Cenaiko (born 1956), Canadian politician
- Harvey Clark (disambiguation), various people
- Harvey Cox, American theologian
- Harvey Cushing, pioneer of neurosurgery
- Harvey Davies (born 2003), English footballer
- Harvey Eakin, NASCAR racing driver
- Harvey Einbinder (1926–2013), American physicist and author
- Harvey Elliott (born 2003), English footballer
- Harvey Epstein (born 1967), American politician and attorney
- Harvey J. Fields (1935–2014), American Reform rabbi
- Harvey Fierstein, American actor and playwright
- Harvey Fletcher, American physicist
- Harvey Samuel Firestone (1868–1938), founder of the Firestone Tire & Rubber Company
- Harvey Fisher, Musician, actor, model
- Harvey Freeman (disambiguation), various people
- Harvey Gantt, American architect and Democratic politician
- Harvey Glatman (1927–1959), American serial killer, rapist, kidnapper, and robber
- Harvey Goldsmith, English performing arts promoter
- Harvey Goldstein (1939–2020), statistician
- Harvey Grant (born 1965), American basketball player
- Harvey Hiller (1893–1956), American baseball player
- Harvey Johnson (disambiguation), various people
- Harvey Karten (1935–2024), American neuroscientist
- Harvey Kaye (disambiguation), various people
- Harvey Keitel, American film actor
- Harvey Korman (1927–2008), American actor
- Harvey Kurtzman, American comics creator and editor
- Harvey Kuenn (1930–1988), American baseball player, coach and manager
- Harvey Lewis (disambiguation), various people
- Harvey Lisberg, British talent manager and impresario
- Harvey M. Lifset (1916–2005), New York politician
- Harvey Mandel, American guitarist
- Harvey Martin, American football player
- Harvey Mason, American jazz drummer
- Harvey Mason Jr., seven-time Grammy Award-winning American songwriter
- Harvey Milk, American politician
- Harvey Miller (disambiguation), various people
- Harvey Mudd (disambiguation), various people
- Harvey Parker (disambiguation), various people
- Harvey N. Paulson (1903–1993), American farmer and politician
- Harvey Pekar (1939–2010), American comics writer
- Harvey Penick, American golfer and coach
- Harvey Pitt (1945–2023), American chairman of the U.S. Securities and Exchange Commission
- Harvey Postlethwaite, British engineer and Formula One technical director
- Harvey Pratt (1941–2025), Native American forensic artist
- Harvey Price (disambiguation), various people
- Harvey Proctor (born 1947), British Conservative Member of Parliament
- Harvey Reynolds (born 2004), English rugby league footballer
- Harvey Rosen (1949–2022), Canadian mayor
- Harvey Sarajian (born 2005), American soccer player
- Harvey Sark (1907–1964), American football player
- Harvey Scales (1940–2019), American R&B and soul singer-songwriter
- Harvey Shapiro (disambiguation), various people
- Harvey Silverglate (born 1942), retired American attorney
- Harvey Smith (disambiguation), various people
- Harvey Soning (born 1944), British property consultant and developer
- Harvey G. Stenger, President of Binghamton University
- Harvey Edwin Swennes (1899–1964), American newspaper editor, publisher, and politician
- Harvey Washington Walter (1819–1878), American lawyer and railroad business executive
- Harvey Weinstein, American film producer, co-founder of Miramax Films and The Weinstein Company, and convicted sex offender
- Harvey Williams (disambiguation), various people
- Harvey White (disambiguation), various people
- Harvey Whitehill, American Frontier Sheriff
- Harvey A. Wilder (1907–1968), American farmer and politician

== In fiction ==
- Harvey the 6-foot-3 1/2-inch-tall (190 cm) rabbit, appearing in:
  - Harvey, Mary Chase's 1944 play
  - Harvey, 1950 comedy-drama film based on the play
  - Harvey, 1996 remake of the 1944 film
- Harvey Cheyne Jr., main character in the novel Captains Courageous
- Harvey Dent, the DC comics supervillain Two-Face.
  - Most widely known for his appearance in The Dark Knight (film)
- The titular character of Harvey Beaks
  - Played by Nate Richert in Sabrina the Teenage Witch (1996 TV series).
  - Played by Ross Lynch in the Netflix series Chilling Adventures of Sabrina (TV series).
- Harvey, from Thomas & Friends
- Harvey Specter from the law drama series Suits
- Harvey Birdman, the animated character appearing in:
  - Birdman and the Galaxy Trio
  - Harvey Birdman, Attorney at Law

== See also ==
- Hervé, Breton family name
- Harvard (name)
- Hervey
- Harvie, given name and surname
