= Harvey =

Harvey, Harveys or Harvey's may refer to:

== Arts, entertainment, and media ==
- Harvey (play), a 1944 play by Mary Chase about a man befriended by an invisible anthropomorphic rabbit
- Harvey Awards ("Harveys"), one of the most important awards in American comic industry, founded in 1988
- "Harvey", a song by Her's off the album Invitation to Her's, 2018

=== Films ===
- Harvey (1950 film), a 1950 film adapted from Mary Chase's play, starring James Stewart
- Harvey (1996 film), a 1996 American made-for-television remake of the 1950 film
- Harvey (2023 film), a Canadian animated short film
- Harvey (Hallmark), a 1972 adaptation of Mary Chase's play for the Hallmark Hall of Fame

=== Characters ===
- Harvey (Farscape), a character in the TV show Farscape
- Harvey Beaks, in the Nickelodeon animated series Harvey Beaks
- Harvey Birdman, title character from the teen-adult animated series Harvey Birdman, Attorney at Law
- Harvey Dent, fictional District Attorney and supervillain (as Two-Face) in DC Comics
- Harvey Shine, the protagonist of the motion picture Last Chance Harvey (2008)
- Harvey Specter, the main protagonist of the legal drama Suits
- Harvey Swick, the protagonist of Clive Barker's novel The Thief of Always

== Businesses ==
- Harvey & Co, an iron foundry and engineering works in Cornwall, England, known as pioneers of the industrial revolution
- Harvey Comics, a publisher of comic books from the 1940s to the 1990s
- Harvey House, the first restaurant chain in the United States, that operated in the late 19th and early 20th century near stations along the Santa Fe Railway
- Harvey's, a fast food restaurant chain in Canada
- Harveys, the former restaurant of chef Marco Pierre White
- Harveys (department store), a defunct department store in downtown Nashville, Tennessee
- Harveys (handbag design and manufacturer), a handbag design and manufacturing company
- Harvey's Brewery, founded in 1790 in Sussex, England
- Harveys Furniture, a British furniture chain
- Harveys Lake Tahoe, a casino in Stateline, Nevada now known as Caesars Republic Lake Tahoe
- Harveys Supermarkets, a supermarket chain in the southeast United States
- John Harvey & Sons, a wine and sherry blending and merchant business
- Harvey's Butter Rum Batter, a confection company in Bremerton, Washington

== People ==
- Harvey (name)

== Places ==
=== In Australia ===
- Harvey, Western Australia
  - Harvey railway station, Western Australia
- Shire of Harvey, Western Australia

=== In Canada ===
- Harvey, British Columbia in Fraser-Fort George
  - Harvey, British Columbia railway station in Harvey, British Columbia
- Harvey Parish, New Brunswick, in Albert County
  - Harvey, Albert County, New Brunswick, a community in Harvey Parish
- Harvey, New Brunswick, a village in York County, sometimes called Harvey Station
- Harvey Station, New Brunswick, in York County

=== In the United States ===
- Harvey, Arkansas
- Harvey, Illinois
- Harvey, Iowa
- Harvey, Louisiana, the most populous place with the name
- Harvey, Michigan
- Harvey, North Dakota
- Harvey, Virginia
- Harvey, West Virginia
- Harvey Point, a U.S. Department of Defense and Central Intelligence Agency facility in North Carolina

== Other uses ==
- "Harvey" or "Harvey Smith", term for the V sign
- Harvey armor, a type of naval armour
- Harvey F.C., a soccer team from Harvey, Illinois, USA
- Harvey mannequin, an early medical simulator
- Harvey Wallbanger, a cocktail
- USS Harvey (PF-80), a US Navy frigate, later the Royal Navy frigate HMS Labuan (K584)
- Harvey (crater), a lunar impact crater
- Harvey (software), a generative AI product
- HARVEY (software), software that simulates blood flow of the human body
- List of storms named Harvey

== See also ==
- Harve
