= Hervey =

Hervey is both an English surname and a masculine given name, probably derived from French Hervé. Notable people with the name include:

Surname:

- Lord Alfred Hervey (1816–1875), English politician
- Lord Arthur Hervey (1808–1894), English bishop
- Arthur Hervey (1855–1922), Irish composer and author
- Augustus Hervey, 3rd Earl of Bristol (1724–1779), English admiral and politician
- Lord Augustus Hervey (1837–1875), English politician
- Lord Charles Hervey (1814–1880), English clergyman and cricketer
- Edward Hervey (born 1973), retired Canadian football player
- Lord Francis Hervey (1846–1931), English barrister and politician
- Frederick Hervey (disambiguation), several people
- George Hervey, 2nd Earl of Bristol (1721–1775), English soldier, diplomat and courtier
- Geraldine Hervey, Marchioness of Bristol (1843–1927)
- Herbert Hervey, 5th Marquess of Bristol (1870–1960), English diplomat
- Irene Hervey (1909–1998), American actress
- Lady Isabella Hervey (born 1982), English socialite, model, and actress
- James Hervey (1714–1758), English clergyman and writer
- James Hervey (physician) (1751?–1824), English physician and pioneer of smallpox vaccination
- Jason Hervey (born 1972), American actor, television producer and public relations agent
- John Hervey (disambiguation), several people
- Lady Mary Hervey (1700–1768), née Lepell, English courtier
- Matt Hervey (born 1966), American ice hockey player
- Lord Nicholas Hervey (1961–1998), English aristocrat and monarchist
- Robert Hervey (1820–unknown), Scottish-Canadian-American lawyer
- Thomas Kibble Hervey (1799–1859), British poet and critic
- Victor Hervey, 6th Marquess of Bristol, (1915–1985), English aristocrat, monarchist and businessman
- Lady Victoria Hervey (born 1976), English model, socialite and TV personality
- Walter Lowrie Hervey (1862–1952), American educator
- William Hervey, 1st Baron Hervey (died 1642), English soldier and politician
- Sir William Hervey (1586–1660), English politician
- Wilna Hervey (1894–1979), American silent film actress and artist
- Winifred Hervey (born 1955), American television producer and screenwriter

Given name:

- Hervey le Breton (died 1131), Breton cleric
- Hervey de Keith (died c.1198), Marischal of Scotland
- Hervey de Stanton (1260–1327), English judge
- Hervey C. Calkin (1828–1913), American politician
- Hervey White (1866–1944), American writer and poet
- Hervey Tudway (1888–1914), English cricketer
- Hervey Allen (1889–1949), American writer
- Hervey Rhodes, Baron Rhodes (1895–1987), English politician
- Hervey M. Cleckley (1903–1984), American psychiatrist
- Hervey Machen (1916–1994), American politician

== See also ==
- Hervey Bay, Queensland, Australia
- Hervey Range (mountains), Queensland, Australia
- Hervey-Jonction, Quebec, Canada
- Hervey Street Road Stone Arch Bridge, New York state, USA
- Harvey (disambiguation)
- Herve (disambiguation)
