= 1968 in France =

- Decades: 1940s; 1950s; 1960s; 1970s; 1980s
- See also: History of France; Timeline of French history; List of years in France

Events from the year 1968 in France were categorized by protests and general unrest across the country as part of the many protests of 1968 that occurred across the globe in that year.

== Incumbents ==
- President: Charles de Gaulle
- Prime Minister: Georges Pompidou (until 10 July), Maurice Couve de Murville (starting 10 July)

== Events ==
- 27 January – French submarine sinks in the Mediterranean with 52 men on board.
- 9 March – A Douglas DC-6B (43748) of L'Armée de L'Air flies into a hill on Réunion, killing 16 of the 17 occupants. The plane, which was headed from Saint-Denis to Djibouti, crashed due to an incorrect takeoff procedure causing it to fly inland instead out of towards the ocean. Among the passengers was General Ailleret, the chief of defence staff. This crash is the deadliest to occur on Réunion.
- 22 March – Mouvement du 22 Mars: Daniel Cohn-Bendit and seven other students occupy administrative offices of the new Nanterre campus of the University of Paris, setting in motion a chain of Mai 68 events that will lead France to the brink of revolution.
- 23 April – Surgeons at the Hôpital de la Pitié, Paris, perform Europe's first heart transplant operation.
- May – Mai 68: Student strikes develop into widespread and unprecedented protests over poor working conditions and a rigid educational system, which threaten to bring down the government.
- 2 May – Mai 68: Authorities close the Nanterre campus of the University of Paris and the focus of protest moves to the Sorbonne.
- 6 May – Mai 68: Members of the Union Nationale des Étudiants de France and supporters march and begin battling with police on the streets of Paris.
- 13 May – Mai 68: The major left trade union federations, the Confédération Générale du Travail (CGT) and the Force Ouvrière (CGT-FO), call a 1-day general strike and join student protesters in a million-strong march through the streets of Paris.
- 14 May – Mai 68: Workers at the Sud Aviation aircraft factory near Nantes begin a sit-down strike, becoming "the very first of the French factories to go on strike" and setting a precedent that would soon spread to the Renault automobile factories, then to western France and eventually to the entire nation.
- 16 May – Mai 68: Employees seize control of the automobile factories owned by the nationalized Renault company, taking control at Boulogne-Billancourt, Rouen, Le Havre, Le Mans and Flins. Workers strike at two factories at Lyon, several newspapers in Paris, and shut down Orly Airport at Paris.
- 27 May – Mai 68: Grenelle agreements concluded, giving a 35% increase in the guaranteed minimum wage and 10% increase in average real wages, but are rejected by trade unions.
- 29 May – Mai 68: President de Gaulle leaves Paris without telling his prime minister, Georges Pompidou, where he is going – which is in fact to the headquarters of the French Forces in Germany at Baden-Baden to assure himself of military support.
- 30 May – Mai 68: With hundreds of thousands marching on the streets of Paris, President de Gaulle calls an election, which has the effect of calming the situation.
- 23–30 June – 1968 French legislative election: The Gaullist Union pour la défense de la République (UDR) becomes the first party in French political history to obtain an absolute majority in the National Assembly. George Pompidou leads the party through the campaign but resigns as prime minister afterwards and is succeeded on 10 July by Maurice Couve de Murville. The Mai 68 public unrest subsides.
- 24 August – France and weapons of mass destruction: Canopus (nuclear test): France explodes its first hydrogen bomb over Fangataufa atoll near Moruroa (at this time known as Mururoa) in French Polynesia, thus becoming the world's fifth nuclear power. French tests here lead to widespread protest from other Pacific nations.
- 11 September – Air France Flight 1611 crashes into the Mediterranean off Nice, killing all 95 on board.
- 12 September – Launch of the Peugeot 504, successor the 404, available as a four-door five-seater saloon or five-door seven-seater estate, both with rear-wheel drive.
- 10 December – René Cassin is presented with the Nobel Peace Prize.

== Arts and literature ==
- Singer Dalida releases the singles "Le Temps des Fleurs", "Je m'endors dans tes bras", and "Si j'avais des millions".
- 7 February–22 April – Film archivist Henri Langlois is suspended from his post at the Cinémathèque française.
- 14 August – François Truffaut's romantic comedy-drama film Stolen Kisses (Baisers volés), set in contemporary Paris, is premièred at the Avignon Film Festival.

== Sport ==
- 6 February – 18 February – The 1968 Winter Olympics takes place in Grenoble. The host nation finishes third on the medal table with four gold, three silver, and two bronze medals.
- 27 June – Tour de France begins.
- 7 July – French Grand Prix is won by Jacky Ickx in a Ferrari.
- 21 July – Tour de France ends, won by Jan Janssen of the Netherlands.
- 28–29 September – In the 24 Hours of Le Mans motor race, the team of Pedro Rodríguez and Lucien Bianchi wins driving a Ford GT-40.
- In horse racing, the Prix de l'Arc de Triomphe is won by Vaguely Noble.
- Jean-Claude Killy is men's overall alpine skiing world champion.
- The French Tennis Open is won by Ken Rosewall (men) and Nancy Richey (women).
- AS Saint-Étienne won the football double of Ligue 1 and Coupe de France.

== Births ==
=== January to March ===
- 3 January – Gérald Mossé, jockey.
- 9 January – Franck Dumas, soccer player, manager.
- 11 January – Philippe Cavoret, skeleton racer.
- 21 January – Sébastien Lifshitz, screenwriter and director.
- 22 January – Frank Leboeuf, international soccer player.
- 27 January – Patrick Blondeau, soccer player.
- 28 January – Mathilde Seigner, actress.
- 4 February – Éric Sikora, soccer player.
- 6 February – Patrick Lemarié, motor racing driver.
- 9 February – Pascal Chanteur, cyclist.
- 9 February – Frédéric Meyrieu, cyclist.
- 10 February – Stéphane Pounewatchy, soccer player, agent.
- 13 February – Fabrice Henry, soccer player.
- 17 February – Jérôme Gnako, soccer player.
- 25 February – Sandrine Kiberlain, actress.
- 28 February – Éric Le Chanony, bobsledder and Olympic medallist.
- 1 March – Vincent Ribeton, Catholic priest and seminary rector.
- 9 March – Youri Djorkaeff, international soccer player.
- 18 March – Christophe Pinna, karateka.
- 23 March – Pierre Palmade, actor and comedian.
- 26 March – Laurent Brochard, cyclist.
- 28 March – Alain Caveglia, soccer player.

=== April to June ===
- 3 April – Philippe Rombi, film score composer.
- 5 April – Serge Vaudenay, cryptographer.
- 7 April – Christophe Ohrel, soccer player.
- 9 April – Marie-Claire Restoux, judoka and Olympic gold medallist.
- 13 April – Jeanne Balibar, actress.
- 8 May – Éric Martineau, politician
- 9 May – Marie-José Pérec, athlete and Olympic gold medallist.
- 10 May – Thomas Coville, yachtsman.
- 17 May – Constance Menard, dressage rider and equestrienne.
- 28 May – Pascal Pierre, soccer player.
- 4 June – Sandrine Fricot, high jumper.
- 6 June – Dominique Boeuf, jockey.
- 14 June – Cathy Chedal, alpine skier

=== July to September ===
- 6 July – Sylvain Guillaume, Nordic combined skier and Olympic medallist.
- 10 July – Frédéric Kuhn, hammer thrower.
- 22 July – Thierry Brusseau, athlete.
- 23 July – Jean-Marc Chanelet, soccer player.
- 30 July – Gilles Maignan, cyclist.
- 3 August – Christophe Bordeau, swimmer and Olympic medallist.
- 5 August – Marine Le Pen, politician.
- 23 August – Franck Rolling, soccer player.
- 23 August – Sylvie Josserand, politician.
- 1 September – Franck Lagorce, motor racing driver.
- 3 September – Christophe Mengin, cyclist.
- 7 September – Marcel Desailly, soccer player.
- 10 September – Florence Devouard, former chair of the Board of Trustees of the Wikimedia Foundation.
- 22 September – Pascal Fugier, soccer player.
- 23 September – Stéphane Mahé, soccer player, manager.
- 26 September – Frédéric Moncassin, cyclist.
- 30 September – Hervé Renard, soccer player, manager.

=== October to December ===
- 5 October
  - Alexandre de Betak, fashion and furniture designer.
  - Xavier Gravelaine, soccer player, manager.
- 6 October – Dominique A, songwriter and singer.
- 15 October – Didier Deschamps, soccer player.
- 28 October – François Simon, cyclist.
- 30 October – Emmanuelle Claret, biathlete. (died 2013)
- 9 November – Pascal Pons, percussionist.
- 27 November – Michael Vartan, actor.
- 30 November – Laurent Jalabert, cyclist.
- 8 December – Philippe Katerine, singer.
- 10 December – Denis Langlois, race walker.
- 11 December
  - Emmanuelle Charpentier, researcher in microbiology, genetics and biochemistry
  - Fabien Lévy, composer.
- 12 December – Rodolphe Gilbert, tennis player.
- 17 December – Fabrice Neaud, comic artist.
- 30 December – Fabrice Guy, Nordic combined skier and Olympic gold medallist.

=== Full date unknown ===
- Marc Fleury, software designer.
- Christophe Godin, guitarist.
- Hervé Paillet, actor and painter.
- Stéphane Pompougnac, House DJ, musician, composer and producer.

== Deaths ==
=== January to March ===
- 9 January – Louis Aubert, composer (born 1877).
- 18 January – Gribouille, singer (born 1941).
- 4 February – Jean Gachet, boxer and Olympic medallist (born 1894).
- 5 February – Paul Marie André Richaud, Cardinal (born 1887).
- 8 February
  - Maurice Maillot, actor (born 1906)
  - René Navarre, actor (born 1877).
- 14 February – Pierre Veuillot, Cardinal (born 1913).
- 6 March – Léon Mathot, actor and film director (born 1886).
- 17 March – Jules Basdevant, law professor (born 1877).
- 24 March – Alice Guy-Blaché, pioneer filmmaker, first female film director (born 1873).

=== April to June ===
- 15 May – Gilbert Gérintès, rugby union player (born 1902).
- 31 May
  - Abel Bonnard, poet, novelist and politician (born 1883).
  - Paul Marchandeau, politician and Minister (born 1882).
- 11 June – Jean-Julien Lemordant, artist and soldier (born 1882).
- 17 June – Adolphe Mouron Cassandre, painter, commercial poster artist and typeface designer (born 1901).
- 27 June – Léon Poirier, film director, screenwriter and film producer (born 1884).

=== July to September ===
- 8 July – Désiré Mérchez, swimmer, water polo player and Olympic medallist (born 1882).
- 21 July – Robert Péguy, film director (born 1883).
- 10 August – Gabriel Hanot, soccer player and journalist (born 1889).
- 14 August – Marcel Thil, world champion boxer (born 1904).
- 2 September – André Girard, painter, poster-maker and Resistance member (born 1901).
- 11 September – René Cogny, General (born 1904).
- 17 September – Armand Blanchonnet, cyclist and Olympic gold medallist (born 1903).
- September – Pierre Grany, athlete (born 1899).

=== October to December ===
- 2 October – Marcel Duchamp, artist (born 1887).
- 9 October – Jean Paulhan, writer, literary critic and publisher (born 1884).
- 25 October – Jean Schlumberger, writer and journalist (born 1877).
- 26 October – Jean Hyppolite, philosopher (born 1907).
- 6 November – Charles Münch, conductor and violinist (born 1891).
- 11 November – Jeanne Demessieux, organist, pianist, composer and teacher (born 1921).
- 13 November – André Prudhommeaux, anarchist bookstore owner (born 1902).
- 25 November – Marcel Labey, conductor and composer (born 1875).
- 28 November – Jean Delsarte, mathematician (born 1903).
- 3 December – Lucien Callamand, actor (born 1888).
- 7 December – Pierre Jaminet, cyclist (born 1912).

== See also ==
- List of French films of 1968
