= 1967 in France =

- Decades: 1940s; 1950s; 1960s; 1970s; 1980s
- See also: History of France; Timeline of French history; List of years in France

Events from the year 1967 in France.

== Incumbents ==
- President: Charles de Gaulle
- Prime Minister: Georges Pompidou

== Events ==
- 5 March – Legislative Election held.
- 12 March – Legislative Election held.
- 19 March – A referendum in French Somaliland favors the connection to France.
- 6 April – Georges Pompidou begins to form the next French government.
- 28 April – Elf Aquitaine petroleum brand launched.
- 24 July – During an official state visit to Canada, President Charles de Gaulle declares to a crowd of over 100,000 in Montreal: Vive le Québec libre! (Long live free Quebec!).
- 29 July – Georges Bidault moves to Belgium where he receives political asylum.
- 24 September – Cantonales Elections held.
- 1 October – Cantonales Elections held.
- 17 November – Author Régis Debray is sentenced to 30 years imprisonment in Bolivia.
- 27 November – Charles De Gaulle vetoes British entry into the European Economic Community again.
- 11 December – The Concorde aircraft is unveiled in Toulouse.

== Sport ==
- 29 June – Tour de France begins.
- 23 July – Tour de France ends, won by Roger Pingeon.

== Births ==
=== January to March ===
- 25 January – David Ginola, soccer player.
- 24 February – Jean-Charles Gicquel, high jumper.
- 28 February – Laurence Treil, model and actress.
- 2 March – Thierry Lacroix, rugby union player.
- 6 March – Hervé Piccirillo, soccer referee.
- 7 March – Jean-Pierre Barda, pop star and actor.
- 17 March – Nathalie Marquay, beauty queen.
- 24 March – Philippe d'Encausse, pole vaulter.
- 24 March – Thierry Jarnet, jockey.
- 25 March – Marie-Agnès Poussier-Winsback, politician
- 28 March – Christophe Brunet, judoka.
- 29 March – Nathalie Cardone, actress and singer.

=== April to June ===
- 3 April – Mathieu Kassovitz, director, screenwriter, producer and actor.
- 10 April – Bernard Pascual, soccer player.
- 19 April – Philippe Saint-André, rugby union player.
- 22 April – Valéry Grancher, Internet-based artist, performer, theorist, curator and lecturer.
- 24 April – Lionel Pérez, soccer player.
- 1 May – Nicolas Jean-Prost, ski jumper.
- 11 May – Patricia Chauvet, alpine skier.
- 22 May – Christophe Gagliano, judoka.
- 31 May – Sandrine Bonnaire, actress.
- 1 June – Olivier Delaître, tennis player.
- 7 June – Armand Schiele, alpine skier
- 21 June – Pierre Omidyar, entrepreneur and philanthropist/economist.
- 26 June
  - Olivier Dahan, film director and screenwriter.
  - Benoît Hamon, politician and MEP

=== July to September ===
- 1 July – Jean-Claude Colotti, cyclist.
- 8 July – Stéphane Belmondo, jazz trumpeter and flugelhornist.
- 14 July – Valérie Pécresse, politician.
- 16 July – Christophe Rocancourt, impostor and con artist.
- 10 August – Jean-Guy Wallemme, soccer player, manager.
- 15 August – Frédéric Nihous, politician.
- 22 August – Valérie Rouzeau, poet and translator.
- 31 August – Stéphane Haccoun, boxer.
- 2 September – Fabrice Divert, soccer player.
- 3 September – Hubert Fournier, soccer player.
- 13 September – Franck Monnet, singer-songwriter.
- 19 September – Philippe Raschke, soccer player.
- 26 September – Eric Roy, soccer player.

=== October to December ===
- 2 October – Fabien Cousteau, aquatic filmmaker and oceanographic explorer.
- 7 October – Fabrice Moreau, soccer player.
- 13 October – Jean-Luc Dogon, soccer player.
- 14 November – Raphaël Piolanti, hammer thrower.
- 15 November – François Ozon, film director and screenwriter.
- 23 November – Christophe Cocard, soccer player.
- 5 December – Luc Jacquet, film director.
- 10 December – Daniel Dutuel, soccer player.
- 23 December – Carla Bruni, songwriter, singer and former model, third wife of French President Nicolas Sarkozy.

=== Full date unknown ===
- Stéphane Allagnon, film director and screenwriter.
- Hervé Cuillandre, novelist and photographer.
- Isabelle Dinoire, first person to undergo a partial face transplant. (died 2016)
- Benoît Lecomte, long distance swimmer.
- Frédéric Lepied, computer engineer.
- Quentin Meillassoux, philosopher.
- Sandrine Veysset, film director.

== Deaths ==
=== January to June ===
- 26 January – Eugène Le Moult, naturalist and entomologist (born 1882).
- 27 January – Alphonse Juin, Marshal of France (born 1888).
- 19 April – Julien Peridier, electrical engineer and astronomer (born 1882).
- 21 April – André-Louis Danjon, astronomer (born 1890).
- 26 April – Jean Alexandre Barré, neurologist (born 1880).
- 26 June – Françoise Dorléac, actress (born 1942).

=== July to December ===
- 11 July – André Giriat, rower and Olympic medallist (born 1905).
- 25 July – Pierre Albert-Birot, author (born 1876).
- 28 July – Paul Rassinier, pacifist, political activist and author (born 1906).
- 1 August – Jacques Suzanne, painter, artist and explorer (born 1880).
- 12 August – Antoine Gilles Menier, businessman and municipal politician (born 1904).
- 18 August – Paule Maurice, composer (born 1910).
- 27 August – Henri-Georges Adam, engraver and sculptor (born 1904).
- 11 September – Georges Saillard, actor (born 1877).
- 18 September – Marcel Rey-Golliet, boxer (born 1893).
- 20 September – Henri Mulet, organist and composer (born 1878).
- 25 September – Octave Denis Victor Guillonnet, painter (born 1872).
- 9 October – André Maurois, author and man of letters (born 1885).
- 13 October – Georges Sadoul, journalist and cinema writer (born 1904).
- 14 October – Marcel Aymé, novelist and children's writer (born 1902).
- 30 October – Julien Duvivier, film director (born 1896).
- 6 November – Jean Dufay, astronomer (born 1896).

=== Full date unknown ===
- Stéphane Boudin, interior designer (born 1888).
- Marguerite Huré, stained glass artist (born 1895).
- Marcelle Lalou, Tibetologist (born 1890).
- Théodore Eugène César Ruyssen, historian of philosophy and pacifist (born 1868).

== See also ==
- List of French films of 1967
