= Love on the Line =

Love on the Line may refer to:

- Love on the Line (album) (reissued as Stop Space Return) or the title song, by Crazy Penis, 2008
- Love on the Line (EP) or the title song, by Whitecross, 1988
- Love on the Line, an album, or the title song, by Tommy Seebach, 1981
- "Love on the Line" (Blazin' Squad song), 2002
- "Love on the Line", a song by Barclay James Harvest, from the 1979 album Eyes of the Universe
- "Love on the Line" (Lydia Murdock song), 1984
- "Love on the Line", a song by June Pointer, 1989
- "Love on the Line (Call Now)", a song by indie rock band Her's, from the album "Invitation to Her's"
- "Love on the Line", a song by Karyn White, B-side of "The Way You Love Me", 1988
- "Love on the Line", an episode of The John Larroquette Show

== See also ==
- Love on Line (LOL), a 2009 Filipino film
