= Roger Agache =

French archaeologist (1926–2011)

- Born: August 16, 1926
- Died: September 17, 2011 (aged 85)
- Occupation: archaeologist

Roger Agache (August 16, 1926 – September 17, 2011) was a French archaeologist. He was among the first to take part in aerial archaeology in France, and helped to develop a methodology for aerial prospecting.

== Early life and education ==
Agache was born in Amiens, Picardy and died in Abbeville, Picardy. Agache earned PhD in art history and archeology. His doctoral thesis was Atlas d'Archéologie aérienne de Picardie, 1975; La Somme préromaine et romaine, d'après les prospections aériennes à basse altitude (The Pre-Roman and Roman Somme, Based on Low-Altitude Aerial Prospecting), completed in 1978.

== Career ==
Agache studied Paleolithic and Neolithic and then directed its research toward aerial archaeology in northern France, beginning in 1959. His early research helped to show that Gallo-Roman agriculture was more extensive and well-developed than had been previously known.

He was appointed Director of Prehistoric Antiquities for Nord-Picardie on 1 March 1963. He was lecturer at the University of Caen, then researcher at CNRS.

He is the author of more than 200 publications.

Agache spent several thousand hours in the air, taking and later analysing photographs for evidence of ancient settlement and travel patterns. His thousands of aerial photographs have been placed with the Ministry of Culture, where they may be consulted, for the most part at the DRAC in Picardie.

In 1978, Roger Agache was awarded the Grand Prix de Géographie, and in 1983 he received the Grand Prix National de l'Archéologie.

Agache was elected a correspondent of the Institut de France in 1991. The scientific community recognized him during the international conference at Amiens in 1992.

== Bibliography ==
- Agache R. (1962) - Vues aériennes de la Somme et recherche du passé. Bulletin de la Société Préhistorique du Nord, n° spécial 5, 73 pages, 93 fig.; Amiens.
- Agache R. (1964) - La prospection aérienne sur sols nus et l'inventaire archéologique de la Somme, p. 49-58, 6 fig. Actes du colloque international d'archéologie aérienne, du 31/08 au 3/09/1963, SEVPEN, Paris.
- Agache R. (1964) - Archéologie aérienne de la Somme. Bulletin de la Société préhistorique du Nord, n° spécial 6, 67 p., 178 fig.
- Agache R. (1970) - Détection aérienne des vestiges protohistoriques, gallo-romains et médiévaux dans le bassin de la Somme et ses abords. Bulletin de la Société Préhistorique du Nord, Amiens, n° spécial 7, 220 pages, 448 photos.
- Agache R. (1975) - La campagne à l'époque romaine dans les grandes plaines du nord de la France d'après les prospections aériennes. In: Aufstieg und Niedergang der römischen Welt, vol. II, n°4, Walter de Gruyter, Berlin-New-York, p. 658-713, 12 figures, 27 photos.
- Agache R. (1976) - Les fermes indigènes d'époque pré-romaine et romaine dans le bassin de la Somme. In: Cahiers Archéologiques de Picardie, n°3, p. 117-138, 42 fig.
- Agache R. (1978) - La Somme pré-romaine et romaine d'après les prospections à basse altitude. Mémoires de la Société des antiquaires de Picardie, Amiens, n°24, 515 p., 273 photos, 41 fig. The most important regional survey.
- Agache R. (1979) Nouveaux apports des prospections aériennes en archéologie préromaine et romaine de la Picardie. In: Cahiers archéologiques de Picardie, vol. 6, n°6, p. 33–90
- Agache R. (1988) - L'archéologie aérienne. Encyclopaedia Universalis, Paris, t. 2, p. 517-523, 18 photos.
- Agache R. et Bréart B. (1975) - Atlas d'archéologie aérienne de Picardie. La Somme Protohistorique et Romaine. Société des antiquaires de Picardie, Amiens; 2 grands volumes in plano, t. 1 : présentation et répertoire, 164 pages et 196 fig.; t. 2 maps, 18 feuilles IGN au 1/50 000. The only one aerial archaeology atlas published in France.
- Blanchet (J.-C.) et Bréart B. (2011) - Roger Agache (1926-2011), In : Revue archéologique de Picardie, n°3-4, 2011, p. 5-20

== Films ==
- Archéologie aérienne du nord de la France - Détection des vestiges protohistoriques et gallo-romains Production SFRS-CERIMES 1973. Authors: Roger Agache. Director: J.-P. Baux.
- Méthodes modernes de fouilles archéologiques Production SFRS-CERIMES 1967. Authors: Roger Agache, J. Combier, Henry de Lumley, André Leroi-Gourhan. Director: J.-P. Baux.
- R. Agache, le détective du ciel - (Director: P. Goethals). Coproduction Cercle bleu (série portrait F3 L E00614) and FR3 Nord-Picardie, 26', 1997
- L'archéologue volant : R. Agache - (Director: J. Mitsch). Cinquième chaîne et FR3 Sud dans la série Les Dessous de la terre de Francis Duranthon, 27', 26 october 1999 et 24 january 2000
- Interview de R. Agache. In: Gens du Nord et de Picardie, J. Paugam, 55", 1988
