= Havre =

Havre may refer to:

== Places ==
Canada

- Havre-Aubert, Magdalen Islands, Quebec
- Havre Boucher, Nova Scotia
- Havre-Saint-Pierre, Quebec

USA

- Havre de Grace, Maryland
  - Havre De Grace High School
- Havre, Michigan
- Havre, Montana
  - Havre Air Force Station
  - Havre City–County Airport

France

- Havre–Caumartin station, a Paris Metro station, France
- Le Havre, France, often called Havre in English

Elsewhere

- Havré, Belgium
- Havrå (Havre), Norway
- Havre Seamount, Kermadec Islands, New Zealand

== Other ==
- Havre de Grace (horse)
- Havre (ship)

== See also ==
- Le Havre (disambiguation)
- Harve
