= John Harvey =

John Harvey may refer to:

== People ==
=== Academics ===
- John Harvey (astrologer) (1564–1592), English astrologer and physician
- John Harvey (architectural historian) (1911–1997), British architectural historian, who wrote on English Gothic architecture and architects
- John Harvey (psychologist) (born 1943), American psychologist
- John F. Harvey (John Francis Harvey, 1918–2010), Catholic priest and moral theologian, founder of Courage Apostolate
- John T. Harvey (born 1961), English-born American professor of economics at Texas Christian University
- John W. Harvey, American solar physicist

=== The arts and entertainment ===
- John Harvey (actor) (1911–1982), English stage and film actor
- John Harvey (American actor) (1917–1970), American actor
- Harvey (announcer) (John Harvey, born 1951), American television and radio personality
- John Harvey (author) (born 1938), British author of crime fiction
- John Harvey (filmmaker), Australian producer, director, playwright, and screenwriter
- John D. Harvey (born 1968), American horror novelist
- John David Harvey, creator of the British satirical political character Count Binface

=== Business ===
- John Harvey (ironfounder), partner in Harveys of Hayle, late-18th-century ironfounders, father-in-law of Richard Trevithick
- John Anthony Harvey (born 1935), British entrepreneur and logistician

=== Government and politics ===
- John Harvey (Virginia governor) (died 1646), 17th-century Crown governor of Virginia
- John Harvey (Albemarle) (died 1679), Governor of Colonial North Carolina
- John Harvey (North Carolina politician) (died 1775), 18th-century Speaker of the North Carolina House of Representatives
- John Harvey (British Army officer) (1778–1852), officer during the War of 1812 and Governor of several Canadian provinces
- John Harvey (Australian politician) (1823–1893), politician in the early days of South Australia, founder of the town of Salisbury
- John Musgrave Harvey (1865–1940), Australian judge
- John Harvey (British politician) (1920–2008), British Conservative MP for Walthamstow East

=== Military ===
- John Harvey (Royal Navy officer, born 1772) (1772–1837), long serving Royal Navy officer
- John Harvey (Royal Navy officer, born 1740) (1740–1794), long serving naval officer killed at the Glorious First of June
- John Harvey (RAAF officer) (born 1954), current serving RAAF Air Marshal
- John C. Harvey Jr. (born 1951), admiral in the United States Navy

=== Sports ===
- John Harvey (racing driver) (1938–2020), winner of the 1983 Bathurst 1000
- John Harvey (cricketer) (1939–2003), English cricketer
- John Harvey (rugby league) (born 1955), Australian rugby league player and coach
- John Harvey (American football) (born 1966), National Football League running back
- John Harvey (Canadian football) (1950–2024), Canadian Football League running back
- John Harvey (football manager), manager of Heart of Midlothian F.C. 1966–1970
- John Harvey (footballer, fl. 1890–1900), Scottish footballer (Sunderland AFC)
- John Harvey (footballer, born 1933), Scottish footballer (Partick Thistle)
- John Harvey (cyclist) (born 1884), English cyclist

== Ships and boats ==
- SS John Harvey, a 1942 Second World War Liberty ship
- John J. Harvey, historic retired New York City fireboat

== See also ==
- John Harvie (1742–1807), delegate to the Continental Congress
- John Harvie (footballer), Scottish footballer for Falkirk, Clydebank, Johnstone, Dumbarton
- John Harvey & Sons, a wine and sherry blending and merchant business founded in Bristol, England in 1796
- Sir John Martin-Harvey (1863–1944), British actor
- Sir John Harvey-Jones (1924–2008), British businessman, chairman of ICI, then presenter of BBC TV show Troubleshooter
- Jonathan Harvey (disambiguation)
- Jack Harvey (disambiguation)
- John Hervey (disambiguation) (pronounced Harvey)
