= Hervé =

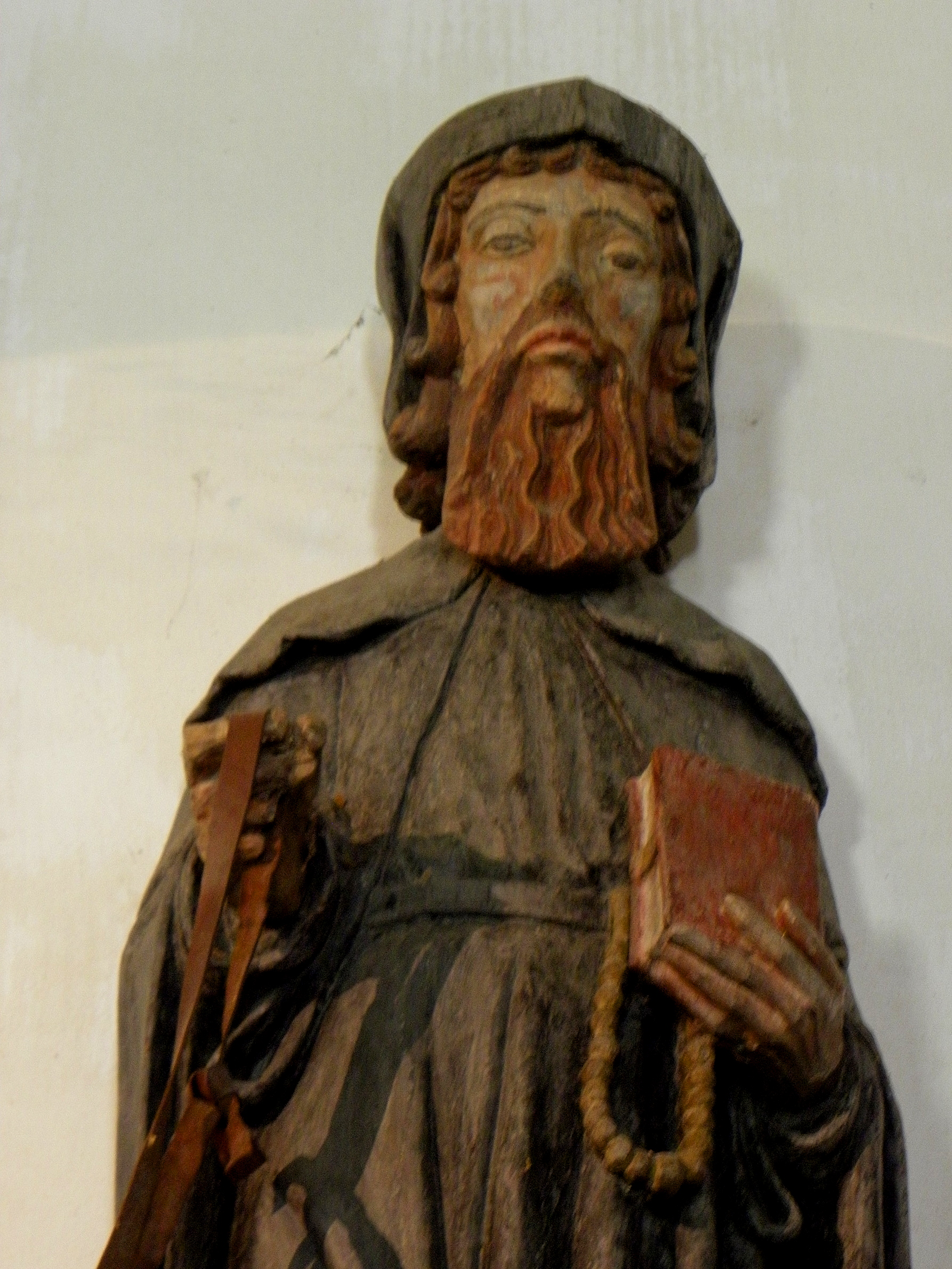
- Saint Hervé
- Pronunciation: French: [ɛʁve]
- Gender: Male
- Languages: French, English
- Name day: June 17

Origin
- Language: Breton
- Meaning: bright iron

Other names
- Variant form: Harvey

Hervé is a French masculine given name of Breton origin, from the name of the 6th-century Breton Saint Hervé. The common latinization of the name is Herveus (also Haerveus), an early (8th-century) latinization was Charivius. Anglicized forms are Harvey and Hervey. Its Old Breton form was Huiarnviu (cf. Old Welsh Haarnbiu ), composed of the elements hoiarn ("iron", modern Breton houarn, cf. Welsh haearn) and viu ("bright", "blazing", modern Breton bev). Its common Celtic form would have been *isarno-biuos or *-ue(s)uos. Recorded Middle Breton forms of the name include Ehuarn, Ehouarn, Houarn. The name of the 6th-century saint is recorded in numerous variants, including forms such as: Houarniault, Houarneau; as the name of a legendary Breton bard, the name occurs in variants such as Hyvarnion, Huaruoé, Hoarvian.

== People with the given name ==
=== Medieval ===
- Saint Hervé, 6th-century Breton saint
  - Saint-Hervé, French commune
  - Saint-M'Hervé, French commune
- Charivius, Duke of Maine (fl. 723)
- Hervé (Norman) (fl. 1050s), Byzantine general of Norman extraction
- Hervey le Breton (died 1131), Bishop of Bangor and later Bishop of Ely
- Hervé IV of Donzy (1173–1223), French nobleman
- Harvey I of Léon, Breton viscount
- Hervé de Bourg-Dieu (c. 1080–1150), Benedictine monk
- Hervaeus Natalis (1260–1323), French Dominican theologian

=== Modern ===
- Hervé Alicarte, French footballer
- Hervé Arsène, French-Malagasy footballer
- Hervé Balland, French cross-country skier
- Hervé Bazin, French writer
- Hervé Biausser, French university director
- Hervé Bochud, Swiss footballer
- Hervé Bohbot, French Scrabble player
- Hervé Bugnet, French footballer
- Hervé Carré, French economist
- Hervé Cuillandre, French writer
- Hervé de Charette, French politician
- Hervé de Luze, French film director
- Hervé Di Rosa, French painter
- Hervé Déry, Canadian librarian and archivist
- Hervé Duclos-Lassalle, French cyclist
- Hervé Faye, French astronomer (1814 – 1902)
- Hervé Filion, Canadian harness racer
- Hervé Gauthier, French footballer and coach
- Hervé Gaymard, French politician
- Hervé Guibert, French writer
- Hervé Guilleux, French motorcycle racer
- Hervé Guy, Ivorian footballer
- Hervé Kage, Belgian footballer
- Hervé Kambou, Ivorian footballer
- Hervé Lacelles, Canadian boxer
- Hervé Lamizana, Ivory Coast football player
- Hervé Le Bras (born 1943), French demographer, historian and mathematician.
- Hervé Le Tellier, French writer
- Hervé Lièvre, French filmmaker, director of head of SFRS-CERIMES (1995–2014)
- Hervé Makuka, Swiss footballer
- Hervé Morin, French politician
- Hervé Ndjana Onana, Cameroonian footballer
- Hervé Novelli, French politician
- Hervé Nzelo-Lembi, Congolese footballer
- Hervé Otélé, French-Cameroonian footballer
- Hervé Paillet, French actor
- Hervé Piccirillo, French football referee
- Hervé Renard, French football manager
- Hervé Revelli, French footballer
- Hervé Riel, French fisherman
- Hervé This, French chemist
- Hervé Tum, Cameroonian footballer
- Hervé Vilard (born 1946), French singer
- Hervé Villechaize (1943–1993), French-American actor
- J. Hervé Proulx, Canadian politician

=== Pseudonym ===
- Hervé (composer) (1825–1892), stage name of French operetta composer, singer, librettist and conductor, born Florimond Ronger
- Hervé (DJ), DJ and producer in the UK

== As a surname ==
Baron Hervey

- Thomas Hervey (landowner) (d. 1694), son of Sir William Hervey (1585–1660)
- John Hervey, 1st Earl of Bristol
- John Hervey, 2nd Baron Hervey
- Augustus Hervey, 3rd Earl of Bristol
- Frederick Hervey, 4th Earl of Bristol

modern French surname

- Antoine Hervé, French composer
- Cédric Hervé, French cyclist
- Edmond Hervé, French politician
- Florence Hervé (born 1944), French historian and journalist
- Francis Hervé (1781–1850), French-British artist
- Francisco Hervé, Chilean geologist
- Gustave Hervé (1871–1944), French politician
- Pascal Hervé (1964–2024), French cyclist

pseudonym

- Lucien Hervé, French-Hungarian photographer, born László Elkán
