= Einbinder =

Einbinder is a surname. Notable people with the surname include:

- Dan Einbinder (born 1989), Israeli footballer
- Hannah Einbinder (born 1995), American comedian, actor, and writer
- Harvey Einbinder (1926–2013), American physicist, author, and amateur historian
