= Walter Hervey =

Walter Hervey may refer to:

- Walter Lowrie Hervey (1862–1952), American educator
- Walter Hervey (mayor), Mayor of London 1271–1273
