= Jack Harvey =

Jack Harvey is the name of:

- Jack Harvey (director) (1881–1954), American actor, director and screenwriter
- Jack Harvey (VC) (1891–1940), English recipient of the Victoria Cross
- Jack Harvey (politician) (1907–1986), American politician
- Jack Harvey (greyhound trainer) (1907-1996), English greyhound trainer
- Jack Harvey (basketball) (1918–1981), American basketball player
- Jack Harvey, pen name of Ian Rankin (born 1960), Scottish novelist
- Jack Harvey (racing driver) (born 1993), British racing driver

== See also ==
- John Harvey (disambiguation)
