= Herve (disambiguation) =

Herve may refer to:

- Herve, a Walloon municipality of Belgium in province of Liege.
  - Herve cheese
  - Land of Herve, a natural region
- Herve Yaméogo (born 1982), Burkinabé basketball player

== See also ==
- Hervé
- Hervé (composer)
