= Harvey Kaye =

Harvey Kaye may refer to:

- Harvey Kaye (university administrator), former provost and CEO of Touro University
- Harvey J. Kaye, American historian and sociologist
