= Harvard (name) =

Given name/first name and surname/last name

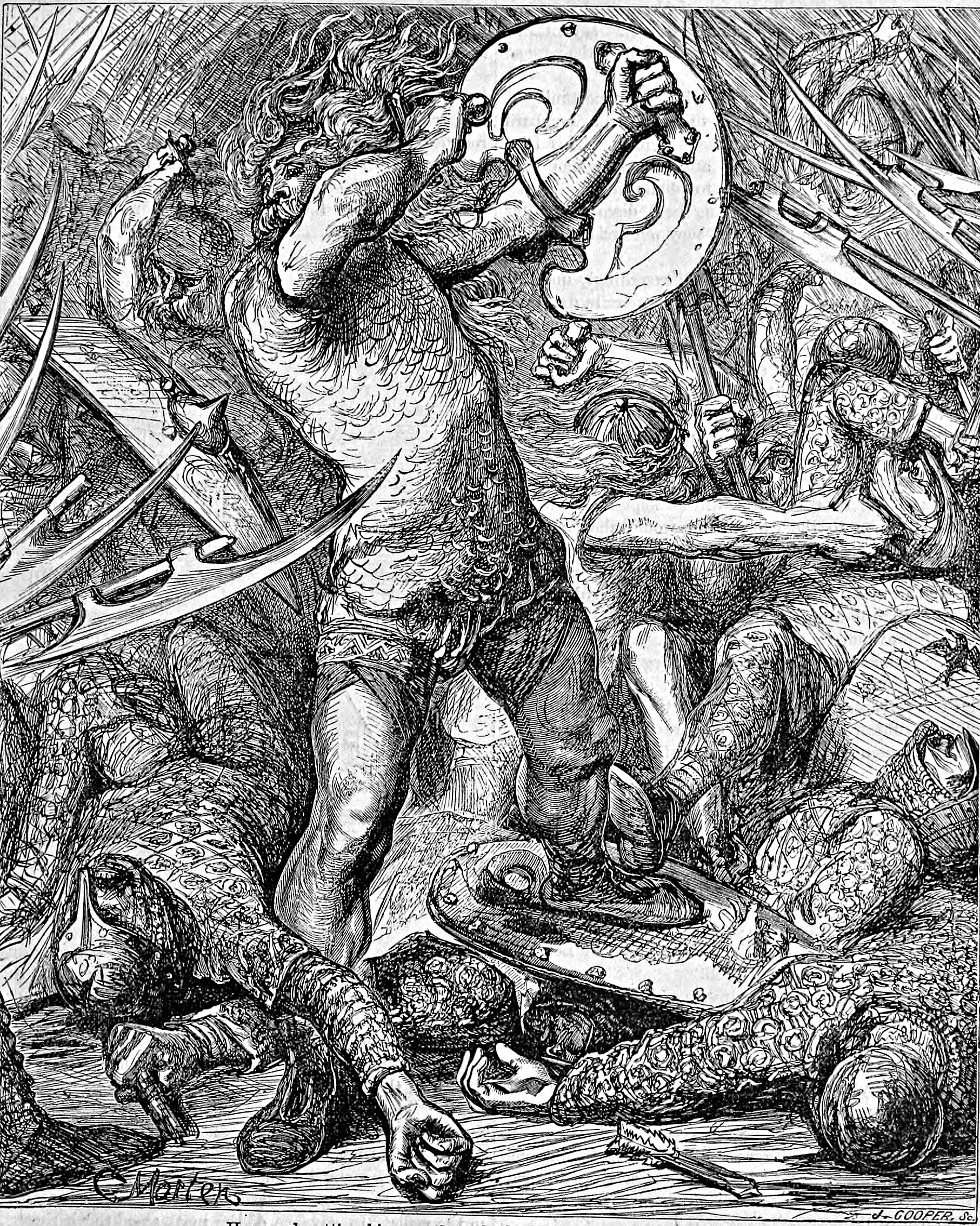
- Hereward the wake fighting Normans
- Pronunciation: hɑː(ɹ)vard

Origin
- Origin: Anglo-Saxon
- Meaning: army guard
- Region of origin: England

Other names
- Variant form: Harvey

Harvard is an English surname/family name/last name and given name/first name, derived a Middle English variant of Hereward; here (“army”) + weard (“guard”).

== People with the given name ==
- Harvard Sitkoff (born 1945), American historian

== People with the surname ==
- Allison Harvard (born 1988), American model and television personality
- John Harvard (clergyman) (1607–1638), English-American clergyman after whom Harvard University is named
- John Harvard (politician) (1938–2016), Canadian politician and journalist, former Lieutenant-Governor of Manitoba
- Lionel de Jersey Harvard (1893–1918), English student; descendant of clergyman John Harvard
- Russell Harvard (born 1981), American actor
- Sue Harvard (1888–1967), Welsh operatic soprano
