= Le Havre (disambiguation) =

Le Havre is a city in France.

Le Havre may also refer to:

- Le Havre AC, a French association football club
- Le Havre (board game), a 2007 resource management game
- Le Havre (film), a 2011 Finnish comedy-drama by Aki Kaurismäki
- Le Havre (horse), French thoroughbred racer; winner of 2009 Prix du Jockey Club
- L'Havre Rock, a reef near L'Esperance Rock in the Kermadec Islands, New Zealand
- Operation Astonia, Battle of Le Havre, a Second World War battle

== See also ==
- Havre (disambiguation)
