= Songs of Her's =

Compilation album by Her's
- Released: 12 May 2017
- Genres: Lo-fi; bedroom pop; slacker rock
- Length: 34:07
- Label: Heist or Hit
- Producers: Her's; Saam Jafarzadeh

Her's chronology
Songs of Her's (2017)	Invitation to Her's (2018)

Singles from Songs of Her's
- 1. "Dorothy" Released: 7 April 2016; 2. "What Once Was" Released: 12 May 2016; 3. "Marcel" Released: 13 October 2016; 4. "Speed Racer" Released: 15 February 2017; 5. "I'll Try" Released: 10 April 2017

Songs of Her's is the debut compilation album by English indie pop band Her's. The nine-track album was released on 12 May 2017 through Heist or Hit Records. The compilation album consists of all of the band's recorded material up to that point, along with four new songs.

== Background ==
In April 2016, Her's released their debut single "Dorothy". It was well received: Jamie Milton of DIY compared them to Wild Nothing, Beach Fossils and Ariel Pink. The next single, "What Once Was", was released the following month. "What Once Was" references the death of Fitzpatrick's mother, Anne, who passed when he was 11. Laading playfully referred to the song as Fitzpatrick's 'magnum opus' and it remains the most popular song of Her's. Upon its release, it was described by reviewer Charlotte Holroyd as possessing an "immensely effective and completely enchanting charm". In October, they released the single "Marcel", inspired by a lost ID card found in a wallet from a vintage shop. Fitzpatrick and Laading discovered that the owner of the ID, Marcel, had died, and dedicated the song to him. A review in The Line of Best Fit described the sound as a combination of British indie, tropical beach wave, and slacker rock. The next single, released in February 2017, was also reviewed in DIY. "I'll Try", the final single to be included on the album, was released in April 2017, and positively received in an NME review.

== Release and reception ==
Professional ratings
Review scores
Source	Rating
The Skinny	4/5 stars

Songs of Her's was officially released on 12 May 2017 to positive reviews from critics. In a four-star review, Will Fitzpatrick of The Skinny compared the album's sound positively to that of Mac DeMarco. Hassan Anderson of London in Stereo also compared the group's sound to DeMarco and to Frank Ocean, singling out new tracks "You Don't Know This Guy", "Medieval", and "Cool With You" as standouts. The Line of Best Fit praised the song "Marcel" which they described as a "tropical track", and they said that Her's kept their usual foundation of jangle pop while adding Hawaiian instruments.

== Track listing ==
All music and lyrics by Her's.

No.	Title	Length
1.	"Dorothy"	4:06
2.	"Cool with You"	6:16
3.	"Marcel"	3:08
4.	"Cop Theme" (instrumental)	0:26
5.	"Speed Racer"	2:32
6.	"Medieval"	5:34
7.	"What Once Was"	4:15
8.	"You Don't Know This Guy"	5:21
9.	"I'll Try"	3:09
Total length:		34:07

== Personnel ==
- Stephen Fitzpatrick – guitars, vocals, drum programming
- Audun Laading – bass guitar, backing vocals, drum programming

Additional personnel

- Saam Jafarzadeh – production
