= Harvie =

Harvie is both a given name and a surname. Notable people with the name include:

== Given name ==
- Harvie Andre (1940–2012), Canadian engineer and politician
- Harvie Branscomb (1894–1998), American theologian and academic administrator
- Harvie Ferguson, British Professor of Sociology
- Harvie Pocza (born 1959), Canadian ice hockey player
- Harvie S (born 1948), American bassist
- Harvie Ward (1925–2004), American golfer
- J. Harvie Wilkinson III (born 1944), American jurist

also

- Harvie Krumpet fictional character and animated short film by Adam Elliot
- Hurvinek or Harvie in Czech film Spejbl a Hurvinek

== Surname ==
- Harvie (surname)
- Betty Harvie Anderson (1913–1979), British Conservative politician
- R. W. Harvie (1868–1922), photographer, father of Ellison Harvie

== See also ==
- Harvey (disambiguation)
