= Hot buttered rum =

Mixed drink containing rum and butter

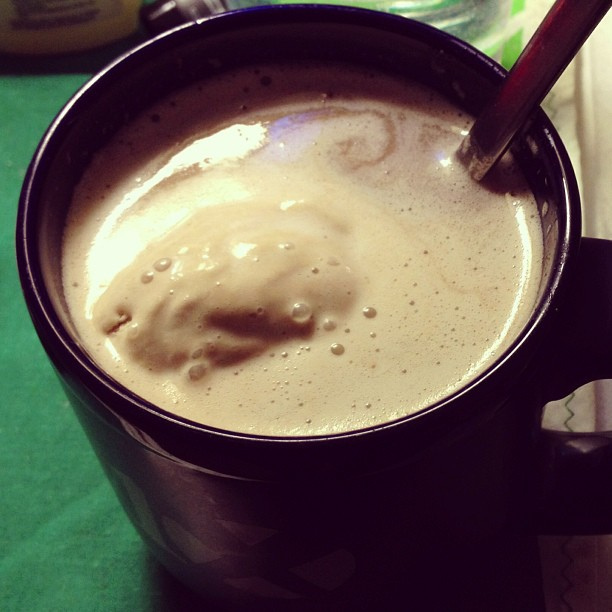
- Hot buttered rum in a mug
- Type: Mixed drink
- Ingredients: Rum, butter, hot water or cider, sweetener and spices
- Standard drinkware: Coffee cup

Hot buttered rum is a mixed drink containing rum, butter, hot water or cider, a sweetener, and various spices (usually cinnamon, nutmeg, and cloves). It is especially popular in the fall and winter and is traditionally associated with the holiday season. In the United States, hot buttered rum dates back to colonial days. During that time many families had their own recipes, and early Americans believed rum to be nutritious and a strengthener of the body.

== Variations ==
In How to Mix Drinks: Or, The Bon-vivant's Companion, mid-19th-century bartender Jerry Thomas provides two recipes (No. 207 and 208, p. 80) for hot rum drinks. The first is called hot spiced rum. The recipe calls for sugar, Jamaica rum, cloves, allspice, butter, and hot water. The second is simply called hot rum, and the recipe is the same as for hot spiced rum but omits the spices. Instead, a bit of nutmeg is grated over the top of the drink.

Some versions call for vanilla ice cream as a substitute or complement to the butter for added creaminess. New versions that some believe to be healthier employ organic coconut oil instead of butter.

=== Tiki versions ===
Hot buttered rum saw new interest in the 1940s as a tiki drink when it was typically served in a ceramic skull mug or modified to become coffee grog. Trader Vic provided a recipe for hot buttered rum batter in his Bartender's Guide which called for 1 lb. of brown sugar, 1/4 lb. of butter, salt and other spices (nutmeg, cinnamon, and cloves). In touting the virtues of hot buttered rum he also provided a warning: "As usually served, it is a weak little noggin with bits of butter floating on top which look good stuck on the customer's upper lip. I urge the use of a batter in order to make some fine drinks". The batter was also used as a basis in other warm alcoholic drinks of his creation such as the Northwest Passage and hot buttered rum cow.

Beyond Trader Vic, at least two other different tiki versions were also made circa 1950. One was the Volcano House hot buttered rum from the Volcano House Hotel in Hawaii, and the other was the Pub and Prow hot buttered rum from a Chicago restaurant of the same name. The Volcano House Hotel's recipe was unusual in that it also called for Maraschino liqueur.

While overproof rum such as Bacardi 151 or Stroh 160 can be used in some versions, early recipes do not call for the drink to be lit on fire when served, even though it is now sometimes done and is part of the presentation for the hot-buttered rum based coffee grog.

== In popular culture ==
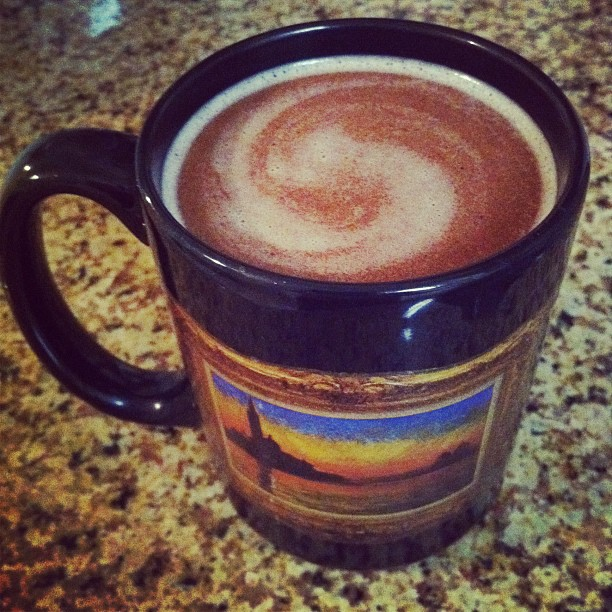
Hot buttered rum

Kenneth Roberts worked the drink into his story for the bestselling 1937 novel Northwest Passage, which some also attribute to the drink's renewed popularity in the 1940s. Wrote Roberts: "After a man’s had two—three drinks of hot buttered rum, he don’t shoot a catamount".

In White Christmas, Bob Wallace, played by Bing Crosby, reflects on the winter season in Vermont. Included in his list is "snow-covered slopes, skiing... hot buttered rum, light on the butter," just before starting the song "Snow" (sung by Crosby, Danny Kaye, Rosemary Clooney and Vera-Ellen). Some celebrate January 17 as "Hot Buttered Rum Day".

== See also ==
- List of hot beverages
- Harvey's Butter Rum Batter, an American company that produces a prepared mix for the drink
