= Jonathan Harvey =

Jonathan Harvey may refer to:

- Jonathan Harvey (composer) (1939–2012), British composer
- Jonathan Harvey (politician) (1780–1859), American politician
- Jonathan Harvey (cricketer) (Jonathan Robert William Harvey, 1944–2026), English cricketer
- Jonathan Harvey (playwright) (Jonathan Paul Harvey, born 1968), English writer
- Jon Harvey (Jonathan David Harvey, born 1980), British parliamentary candidate performing as Count Binface, and scriptwriter

== See also ==
- Jonathon Harvey (Jonathon David Harvey, born 1969), English cricketer
