= Harvey White =

Harvey White may refer to:

- Harvey White (American football) (born 1938), American football quarterback
- Harvey White (surgeon) (born 1936), surgeon and oncologist
- Harvey Elliott White (1902–1988), American physicist and professor
- Harvey White (footballer) (born 2001), English footballer
