= Harvey Clark =

Harvey Clark may refer to:

- Harvey Clark (actor) (1885–1938), American actor from Boston
- Harvey L. Clark (1807–1858), missionary from Vermont, pioneer in Oregon, United States
- Harvey C. Clark (1869–1921), American attorney and military officer
