= Harvey Sark =

American football player (1907–1964)

No. 51, 6, 18, 12
- Positions: Tackle, guard

Personal information
- Born: January 30, 1907; Lawrence, Indiana
- Died: April 10, 1964 (aged 57); Butler County, Kansas
- Listed weight: 210 lb (95 kg)

Career information
- High school: Bartlesville (OK), Enid (OK)
- College: Phillips

Career history
- New York Giants (1931); Cincinnati Reds (1934); St. Louis/Kansas City Blues (1934); Dallas Rams (1934)

Career statistics
- Games played: 5
- Stats at Pro Football Reference

Harvey Sark (January 30, 1907 – April 10, 1964) was an American football guard who played two seasons in the National Football League.

Sark graduated from Bartlesville High School in Bartlesville, Oklahoma in 1926 where he played football for three years and was named to the all-state team as a tackle. He then went on to play football for two years at Phillips University, and was named an honorary captain in 1930.

In August 1931, Sark signed with the New York Giants. He was assigned the jersey number 9 and played in four games. By October 1931, he quit the club after suffering an injury and returned to his home in Tonkawa, Oklahoma. He then coached football at the University of Oklahoma.

By July 1934, he had signed with the Cincinnati Reds. He only appeared in one game for Cincinnati.

Sark joined the American Football League's St. Louis/Kansas City Blues in October 1934. He was transferred to the Dallas Rams in November.

Following his playing career, he worked for the Phillips Petroleum Company. He died in April 1964.
