= Vincent Ribeton =

Vincent Ribeton, F.S.S.P.
- Born: March 1, 1968 (age 58); Northern Basque Country, France
- Education: International Seminary of St. Peter; L'Institut Saint-Thomas-d'Aquin
- Title: Superior of the District of France of the Priestly Fraternity of St. Peter

Vincent Ribeton is a French Roman Catholic priest of the Priestly Fraternity of St. Peter (FSSP) and current rector of the International Seminary of St. Peter in Wigratzbad, Germany. He previously served as district superior of France for the FSSP from 2006 to 2015.

A Frenchman from the Basque Country, Ribeton holds a notarial master in history of law and studied theology at the International Seminary of St. Peter in Wigratzbad, where he is now rector. He also studied at L'Institut Saint-Thomas-d'Aquin (ISTA) in Toulouse, France. In France he exerted pastoral ministries in Saint-Etienne and later as hospital chaplain in Toulouse. He also served as chaplain of the community of faithful entrusted to the Fraternity in Clermont, Landes by the bishop of Aire-et-Dax from 2004 until assuming his post as district superior.
