= Harvey Bennett =

Harvey Bennett may refer to:

- Harvey Bennett Sr. (1925–2004), Canadian ice hockey goaltender for the Boston Bruins
- Harvey Bennett Jr. (born 1952), American ice hockey centre and son of Harvey Sr.
- Harvey Bennett (born c. 1934), American tourist detained for espionage in the Soviet Union
