= Harvey Price =

Harvey Price may refer to:

- Harvey L. Price, scouter (Boy Scouts of America)
- Harvey Price (songwriter), on the Thelma Houston album Sunshower
- Harvey Price, son of Katie Price and Dwight Yorke
