= Harvey, British Columbia =

- Railway Point
- Location of Harvey in British Columbia
- Coordinates: 52°57′28″N 119°26′45″W
- Country: Canada
- Province: British Columbia
- Regional District: Fraser-Fort George
- Time zone: UTC−07:00 (PT)

Harvey is a railway point on the Canadian National Railway located in Tête Jaune Cache, British Columbia, approximately 18 km north of Valemount, British Columbia.
