= Valéry Grancher =

French artist and performer

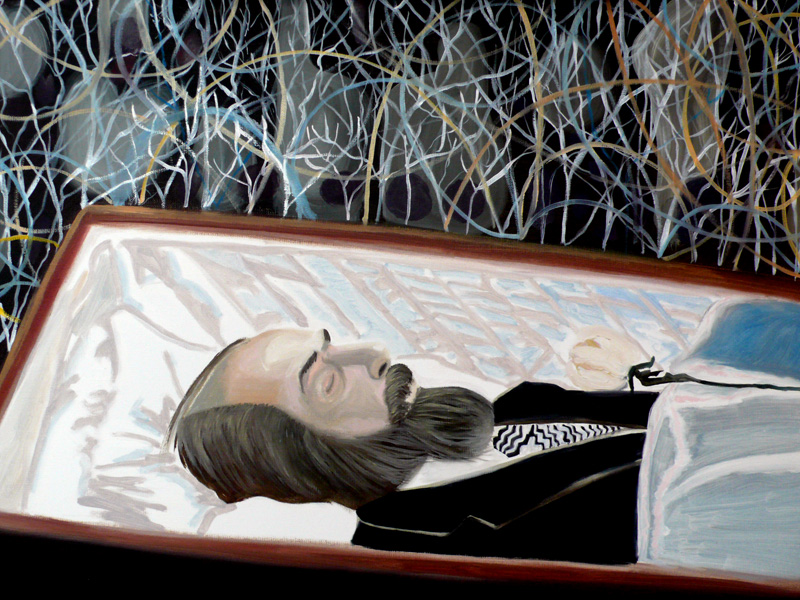
Soljenitsyne: a XXth century paradox by Valéry Grancher (Oil on canvas 61x46 cm)

Valéry Grancher (born April 22, 1967 in Toulon, Var, France) is a French Internet-based artist, performer, theorist, curator and lecturer.

== Biography ==
Grancher's art is a mix of conceptual and pop art references, sometimes with a sense of humour, sometimes appropriating the fads of the day.

Grancher is best known for selling Internet art in the contemporary art mainstream. When Grancher started in the art world in 1995, he used emails in his art to show the processes and exchanges of the Internet community (email art) in physical installations like 'Alone' (1995). In 1997 he used webcams in his project 'webscape', which dealt with the concept of "cybertime." In 1998, Grancher experimented with pop art in his 'webpaintings' project. In 2002, as Google began to dominate the Internet, he launched the "Search Art" collaborative project by creating a piece called 'Self Portrait.'

In 2005, he exhibited and sold at FIAC, the international art fair in Paris, 'the biggest Google paintings never (sic) produced.'

== Exhibitions ==
Since the mid-1990s, Grancher has exhibited at many museums worldwide, including:

- Espace d'Art Concret, Honegger Albers donation, Mouans Sartoux, France (2008, 2007)
- Musée des Beaux Arts, Nîmes, France. (2008)
- New Langton Art Center, San Francisco, USA (2008, 2002)
- Pacific Film Archive Berkeley Art Museum, Berkeley, USA (2007, 2001)
- New Museum of Contemporary Art, New York, USA (Rhizome)(2007)
- Nikon Gallery Europe: "Arts aux Poles". France (2007)
- Palais de Tokyo, site de création contemporaine, Paris, France (performance, exposition personnelle) (2006, 2005)
- Centre National d'Art Contemporain, Le Magasin, Grenoble, France. (2006, 2005)
- Istanbul Contemporary Art Museum, Istanbul Turkey (2006, 2005, 2003)
- "Super!" 1st Triennale of visual arts, fashion and design, Hasselt, Belgium (2005).
- Musée d'Art Moderne, Centre Georges Pompidou, Paris, France (2005, 2004, 2002)
- MAMCO, Musée d'art moderne et contemporain, Geneva, Switzerland (2004, 2005)
- Museo Castagnino, Rosario, Argentina (2004).
- Galleria de arte do Sesi, Sao Paulo, Brasil (2004).
- Musée D'Art moderne de la Ville de Paris, ARC, Paris, France.(2004)
- Kunsthalle Palazzo, Liestal, Switzerland (2003)
- Turm Gallery, Hemstedt, Germany (2003)
- Biennale de Tirana National Gallery of Arts, Tirana, Albania (2003, 2001)
- MUHKA Contemporary Art Museum, Antwerp, Belgium (2003)
- Irish Museum of Modern Art, Dublin, Ireland (2003, 2002)
- Artsonje Museum, Gyeong Ju, South Korea (2002)
- Artsonje Center, Seoul, South Korea (2002)
- Israeli center for digital art, Digital ArtLab, Holon, Israël (2001)
- Pacific Film Archive Berkeley Art Museum, Berkeley, USA (2001)
- Maison Européenne de la Photographie, Paris, France (2000)
- Museu da Imagem e do Som, Sao Paulo, Brasil (2000)
- Fondation Cartier pour l'Art Contemporain, Paris, France (1999, 1998)
- Artspace of Australia, Sydney, Australia (1999, 1998)
- Neuer Berliner Kunstverein, Berlin, Germany (1998)
- Bonn Kunstverein, Bonn, Germany (1998)
- Documenta X Kassel, Kassel, Germany (1997)
- Ars Electronica Center (residence), Linz, Austria (1997)
- CAPC Musée d'Art Contemporain, Bordeaux, France (1996)
- ZKM, Karlsruhe, Germany (1995)
- Carrillo Gil Museum, Mexico, Mexico (1995)
- Pecci Museum, Prato, Italy (1995)
- Moderna Museet, Helsinki, Finland (1994)
- Contemporary Art Center, St Petersburg, Russia (1994)
- Centre d'Art Contemporain, Bruxelles, Belgium (1994)
- Biennale de Lyon, Lyon, France. (1993)

== Permanent Collections ==
- Cabinet des estampes du musée d'Art et d'Histoire de Genêve, Switzerland. (Dos drawing)
- Rhizome artbase Net and media collection, New Museum - New York: USA
- http://www.computerfinearts.com: Net and media art collection - New York, USA: "Jerusalem".(website) 2001
- Maison Européenne de la Photographie, Art Outsiders:Paris, France: "heart time / time heat".(website) 2001
- Fond National d'Art Contemporain, FNAC, Paris, France: "Reposoirs d'écran" (screensaver), "On Air" (VJ performance saved on DVD) 2000.
- Berkeley Art Museum Pacific Film Archive, Berkeley, USA: "24h00" (website) 1999 - 2000
- La Fondation Cartier pour l'Art Contemporain, Paris, France: "Longitude 38" (site internet) 1999, "Self" (website) 1998
- Centre d'art contemporain de St Fons, St Fons, France: "Ulysse" (video) 1996
- ZKM Media museum (video), Karlsruhe, Allemagne: "Memory" (video) 1994 - 1995
- Carillo Gil Contemporary art museum, Mexico, Mexique: "Memory" (video) 1994, "U-Topos" ( installation Réalité Virtuelle) 1995
- Le nouveau musée, l'institut d'art contemporain, Villeurbanne, France: "Epridemik Remix" (video coproduced with Benoit Berry) 1993
