= 1967 French cantonal elections =

Cantonale elections to renew canton general councillors were held in France on 24 September and 1 October 1967.

== Electoral system ==
The cantonales elections use the same system as the regional or legislative elections. There is a 10% threshold (10% of registered voters) needed to proceed to the second round.

== National results ==
Runoff results missing

Party/Alliance	% (first round)	Seats
PCF	26.3%	175
FGDS	21.6%	465
Miscellaneous Right	17.2%	399
UDVR	14.5%	220
CD	8.1%	155
Miscellaneous Left	6.2%	177
RI	4%	94
Far-Left	2%	25
