= Harvey Lewis =

Harvey Lewis may refer to:

- Harvey Lewis (politician) (1814–1888), Irish-born lawyer and politician in the United Kingdom
- Harvey Spencer Lewis (1883–1939), Rosicrucian author, occultist, and mystic
- Harvey Lewis (ultrarunner) (born 1976), American ultrarunner
