= Harvey Smith =

Harvey Smith may refer to:

- Harvey Smith (American politician) (born 1945), American politician in the state of Vermont
- Harvey Smith (baseball) (1871–1962), baseball player
- Harvey Smith (Canadian politician) (1936–2017), politician in Winnipeg, Manitoba, Canada
- Harvey Smith (equestrian) (born 1938), British equestrian
- Harvey Smith (game designer) (born 1966), American game designer
- Harvey Smith (rugby league), English rugby league footballer
- Harvey C. Smith (1874–1929), Republican politician in the U.S. state of Ohio
- Harvey W. Smith (1857–1895), justice of the Supreme Court of the Utah Territory
- L. Harvey Smith (born 1948), New Jersey state senator

== See also ==
- Harv Smyth, senior Royal Air Force officer
