= Harvey Mudd =

Harvey Mudd may refer to:

- Harvey Seeley Mudd (1888–1955), a mining engineer and businessman
- Harvey Mudd College, college named after Harvey Seeley Mudd
