= Harvey Miller =

Harvey Miller may refer to:

== People ==
- Harvey Alfred Miller (1928–2020), American botanist
- Harvey R. Miller (1933–2015), New York lawyer
- Harvey Miller (publisher) (1925–2008), British publisher
  - Harvey Miller Publishers, founded by Miller and now an imprint of Brepols
- Harvey Miller (screenwriter) (1935–1999), American actor, director, producer and screenwriter

== Characters ==
- Harvey Miller, a character from the TV show Baywatch played by Tom McTigue
- Harvey Miller, Jr, the main character of the film The Caddy

== Other uses ==
- SS Harvey C. Miller, a Liberty ship, see List of Liberty ships: G-Je

== See also ==
- Keith Harvey Miller (1925–2019), former governor of Alaska
