= Harveys SeatbeltBags =

American fashion company

Harveys Original SeatbeltBag
- Founded: 1997
- Headquarters: Santa Ana, California
- Products: Handbags, wallets, accessories, men's wallets, laptop bags, diaper bags, luggage
- Website: shopharveys.com

Harveys is a handbag design and manufacturing company in Santa Ana, California, United States. The handbags use a woven design with seatbelts as the medium. All of their bags are handcrafted in the United States.

== History ==
Founded in 1997, Harveys was created while Dana and Melanie Harvey were restoring a 1950 Buick. While installing seatbelts into the car, he decided to make a matching handbag for her. After this, they started making more for friends and family; with demand rising, they turned their garage into their first production site. The Buick was sold and used as capital to fund the growing business, which by 2004 had $3.1 million in revenue and had relocated to a 12,000 square feet (1,100 m^{2}) facility in Santa Ana. Orders for bags have been placed by Nordstrom and Bloomingdale's, among other retailers. The first retail store on Main Street in Santa Ana opened in 2007.
