= Harvey Johnson =

Harvey Johnson may refer to:

- Harvey E. Johnson Jr., retired US Vice Admiral and C.O.O. of the Federal Emergency Management Agency (FEMA)
- Harvey H. Johnson (1808–1896), U.S. Congressional Representative from Ohio
- Harvey Johnson Jr. (born 1946), mayor of Jackson, Mississippi, 1997–2005, 2009-2013
- Harvey Johnson (Australian footballer) (1907–1948), Australian rules footballer for Hawthorn
- Harvey Johnson (coach) (1919–1983), former Buffalo Bills head coach
- Harvey Johnson (reverend) (1843–1923), African American pastor, activist, and leader of the Union Baptist Church
- Harvey Johnson (Maine politician) (1911–1998), Maine state legislator and executive councilor
- Harvey L. Johnson (1904–1995), American scholar of Latin America
- Captain Harvey Johnson, British officer of the native Junagadh State which was annexed by the newly independent India in 1947
- Harvey Johnson, fictional character on Australian soap opera Neighbours
- Harvey Johnson, fictional character in musical Bye Bye Birdie
