= Harvey Soning =

British property developer and businessperson

- Born: Harvey Murray Soning; November 1944 (age 81)
- Occupations: Property consultant and developer
- Known for: Founder, chairman and CEO, James Andrew International Limited
- Spouse: Angela Soning
- Children: 4

Harvey Murray Soning (born November 1944) is a British property consultant and developer, and the founder, chairman and CEO of James Andrew International Limited.

== Career ==
Prior to founding his own firm, Soning worked for Peachey Property Corporation and Guardian Properties (Holdings) Plc.

Soning founded James Andrew International Limited in 1974. The company is based in London's Marylebone High Street.

In 2000, Soning founded the Templewood group of companies, based in Cheltenham, and which provide property services including cleaning and security. In June 2017, the company sold a majority stake to the South African company Excellerate which employed 20,000 staff in 14 countries in Africa and the Middle East, and of which Soning was chairman. Soning remained as chairman and retained a "significant stake".

In November 2014, Soning celebrated his firm's 40th anniversary (and his 70th birthday) at Claridge's, with guests including Sir Martin Sorrell, Vincent Tchenguiz, Liz Peace, Irvine Sellar, and Gerald Ronson.

Soning has been a non-executive director of Allanfield Group since 2011, and of Gresham Hotel Group and Your Space plc.

== Charitable work ==
Soning is a committee member (founder) of the Presidents Club, a trustee of the development council of the Natural History Museum, London, and chairman emeritus of the International NHM Foundation, New York. He was chairman of trustees at the Jewish Community Secondary School (JCoSS). Following negative media coverage of the Presidents Club, which had donated tens of thousands of pounds to JCoSS in recent years, Soning resigned from his position with the school.

== Personal life ==
Soning married Angela Marks in 1964, and they have four sons. In 2003, he renewed his marriage vows with a surprise visit to the Elvis Chapel in Las Vegas, "I told her on the way, and she has never laughed so much in her life".

His son Andrew Soning is also a director of James Andrew International.
