= Harvey Brooks =

Harvey Brooks may refer to:

- Harvey Brooks (bassist) (born 1944), American bassist
- Harvey Brooks (physicist) (1915–2004), American physicist
- Harvey Brooks (composer) (1899–1968), American pianist and composer
