= Her's =

British indie rock duo

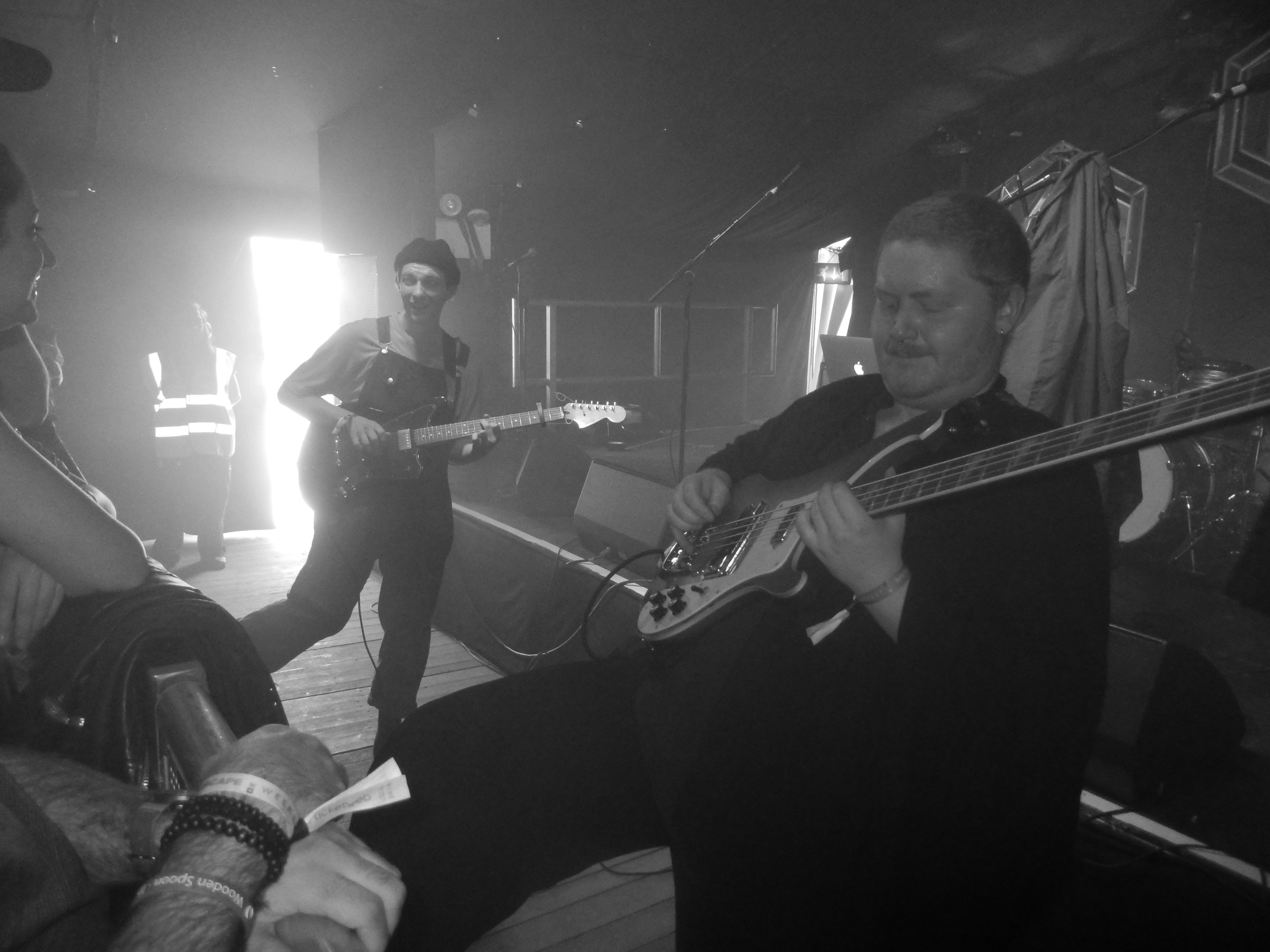
- Her's performing in 2018

Background information
- Origin: Liverpool, England
- Genres: Indie rock; indie pop; dream pop; hypnagogic pop; lo-fi
- Years active: 2015–2019
- Label: Heist or Hit
- Past members: Stephen Fitzpatrick; Audun Laading
- Website: thatbandofhers.com

Her's (also written as thatbandofhers) were an indie rock band from Liverpool, England, composed of English guitarist and singer Stephen Fitzpatrick and Norwegian bassist and backing vocalist Audun Laading. They released a compilation album, Songs of Her's (2017), followed by a full-length studio album, Invitation to Her's (2018).

The duo and their tour manager were killed in a road traffic collision in Arizona while touring the United States in 2019. Heist or Hit Records said of the band's legacy: "Their energy, vibrancy, and talent came to define our label".

== Members ==
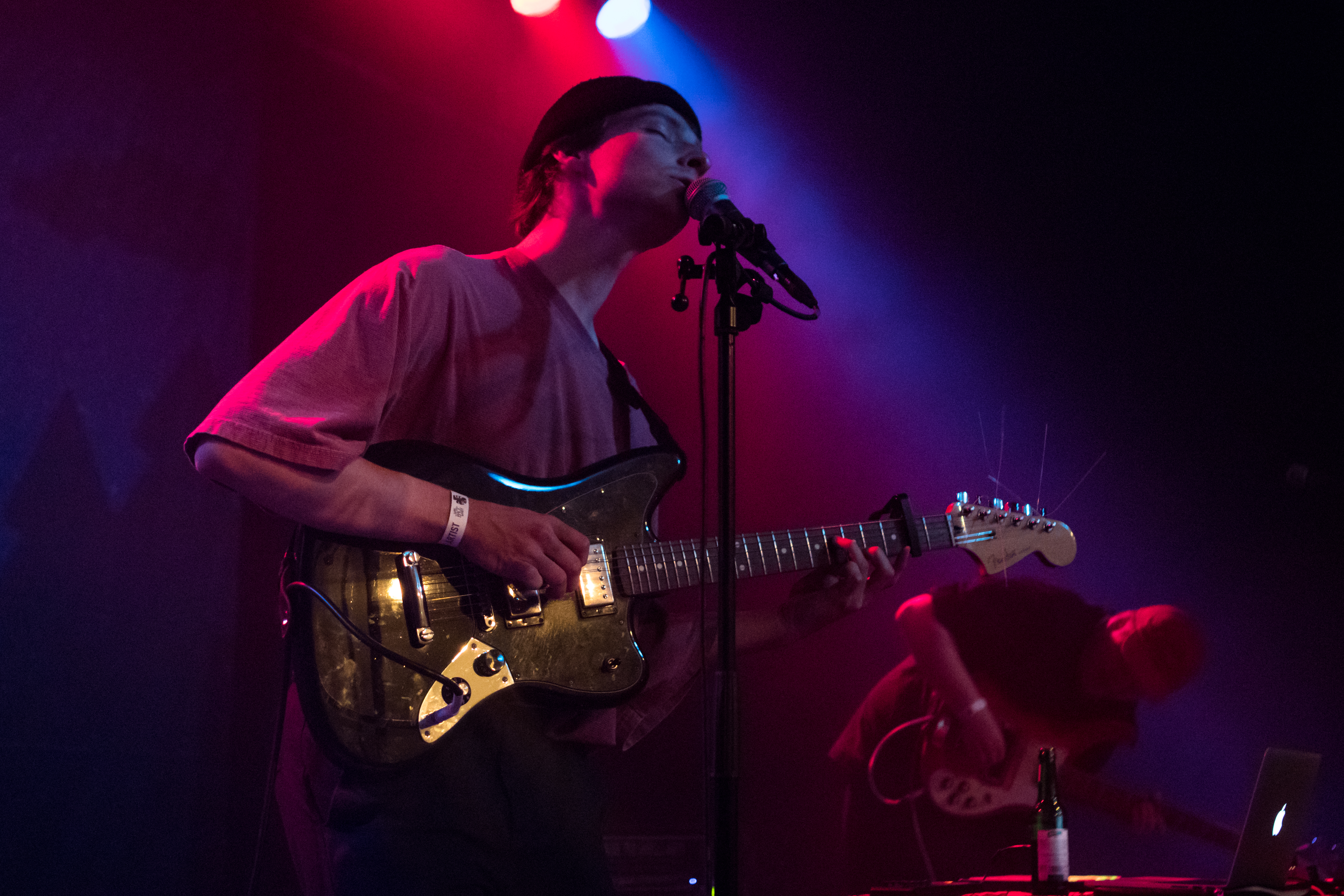

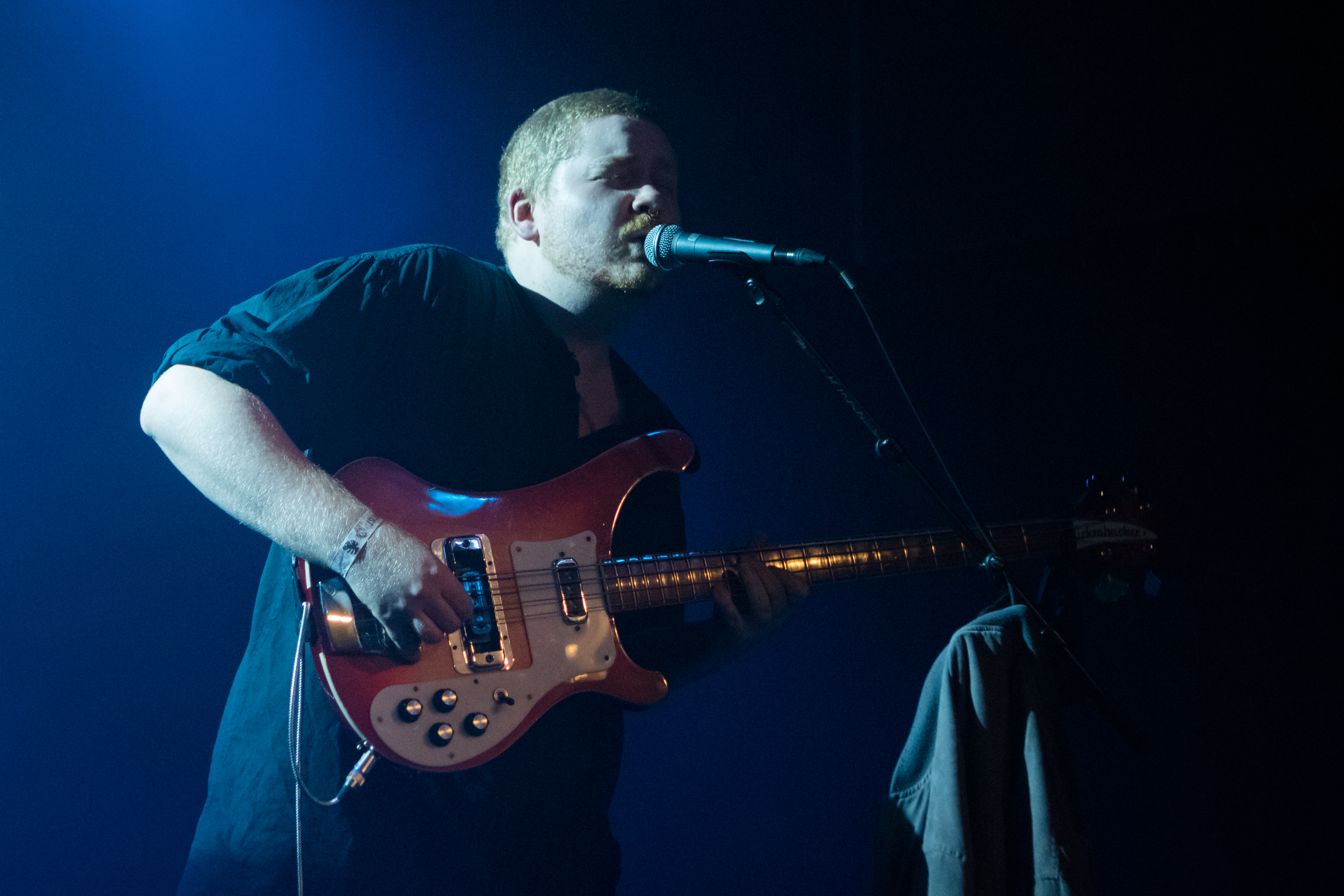
Fitzpatrick (top) and Laading (bottom) performing at Way Back When Festival, 2017

The band's line-up consisted of Stephen Fitzpatrick, from Barrow-in-Furness, Cumbria, who sang lead vocals and played guitar, and Audun Laading, from Flekkerøy, Kristiansand, who played bass guitar and sang backing vocals. Fitzpatrick was also a drummer, but the band used a drum machine with both members contributing to its programming.

== History ==
Fitzpatrick and Laading met at the Liverpool Institute for Performing Arts, from which they both graduated in 2016 after three-year music degrees, being presented with their certificates by Paul McCartney at a graduation ceremony. Whilst still students they formed Her's in 2015, after having previously played together in the rhythm section of another Liverpool band named 'The Sundogs'. The duo initially formed Her's in jest, travelling around Liverpool filming comedic music videos and posting them on YouTube.

They released their debut single, "Dorothy", on 7 April 2016. They performed on the 2016 Green Man Festival Rising Stage. A nine-track compilation titled Songs of Her's was released on 12 May 2017. The compilation received four stars from The Skinny. Writing for NME in April 2017, Thomas Smith said:

Her's are not a group to stand still. Each song they produce, from the lo-fi bedroom pop power of debut track to 'Dorothy' to the duo's equally melodic take on slacker-rock on 'Marcel', sees the Liverpool-based duo shift and float between sounds. Never really fitting into one genre, but somehow nailing whatever they end up doing.

The band later released their debut full-length album, Invitation to Her's, on Heist or Hit Records on 24 August 2018. Her's were featured on Paste's list titled "The 15 New Liverpool Bands You Need to Know in 2018". An acoustic performance by the band at the 2019 South by Southwest festival in Austin, Texas, US was also featured on BBC Music Introducing. The album includes the single "Harvey" which according to Genius, is a reference to the 1950 film Harvey.

== Equipment ==
This duo were very loyal to their choice of guitar and bass. Laading used a Rickenbacker 4001 for his main bass while Fitzpatrick used a Fender Blacktop Series Jaguar HH for his main guitar. There were times where they did not use their main instruments live. During live performances, both of them used a drum machine (specifically the Novation Launchpad USB MIDI Controller for Ableton Live) linked to a MacBook Pro.

== Deaths ==
On 27 March 2019, around 1 a.m., Fitzpatrick and Laading (aged 24 and 25 respectively), along with their tour manager, Trevor Engelbrektson (aged 37) from Minneapolis, were killed in a head-on traffic collision and subsequent vehicle fire near Milepost 68 on Interstate 10, west of Tonopah, Arizona. They were travelling from Phoenix, Arizona, where they had played at the Rebel Lounge on 26 March, to perform a show on the following evening in Santa Ana, California, some 350 miles (560 km) away, as part of a 19-date second tour of North America. The Arizona Department of Public Safety confirmed that Engelbrektson had been driving the band's Ford tour van at the time of the crash. The driver of a Nissan pick-up truck, Francisco Rebollar, aged 64, from Murrieta, California, was also killed in the collision; a subsequent police investigation of the scene located a bottle of alcohol in the wreckage. At the time of the crash, the Arizona Department of Public Safety was already responding to reports of the Nissan pick-up truck travelling at a high speed in the wrong direction going eastbound in the westbound highway lanes.

A requiem mass and burial for Fitzpatrick was held at St Mary's Church, Barrow-in-Furness, on 23 April 2019.

== Legacy ==
Musician and friend of the two, Strawberry Guy, has attributed his stage name to Her's (in which he got his name from a drunk question by Laading.) (Note: "Strawberry Guy's music is a testament to the memory of the missed duo as Her’s came up with the name Strawberry Guy. ‘It was Audun actually. We were walking back from a festival all quite drunk and we were talking about drinks for some reason. Audun asked me, “If you could have any drink right now that wasn’t alcohol, what would you have?” and I replied with “strawberry milkshake”. He then went “Ah, you’re a strawberry guy!”, and I thought it was a good artist name. He then went “Yeah, you’re Strawberry Guy now.” I knew then when I released music it would be under that name. I thought it was sweet, soft and smooth like my music hopefully.’")

The duo's favourite actor, Pierce Brosnan, paid tribute to the band with an Instagram post after they toured with a cardboard cut-out of him (Fitzpatrick went as far to call Brosnan: "Our band spirit animal. Our third member").

On 27 March 2024, five years after the duo's passing, the Friends of Her's memorial fund was created. The charity-memorial fund and organization was created by families and friends of Her's, aiming to help combat homelessness in Liverpool.

On 30 June 2024, The Rebel Lounge hosted a memorial tribute concert for Her's, featuring multiple local musicians. The bands who attended the event paid tribute to the duo by playing songs from the Her's discography. Proceeds were donated to Friends of Her's memorial fund.

On 8 November 2024, Heist or Hit Records released a "Songs of Her's" boxset where all proceeds went towards the Friends of Her's memorial fund.

On 20 October 2026, The Story of Her's, by author Patrick Breen, was published. The book is an independent biography that explores the history and discography of Her's, and consists of 20 chapters, (each named after one of the 20 published Her's songs). Rather than focusing solely on the personal lives of the duo or their sudden passings, Breen complied interviews and stories from the Her's social and professional circles to celebrate and pay tribute to the band's professional lives and the legacy of the duo's music.

== Discography ==
=== Albums ===
==== Studio albums ====
Title	Details
Invitation to Her's	Released: 24 August 2018; Label: Heist or Hit; Formats: CD, digital download, vinyl

==== Compilation albums ====
Title	Details
Songs of Her's	Released: 12 May 2017; Label: Heist or Hit; Formats: CD, digital download, vinyl

=== Singles ===
Title	Year	Album
"Dorothy/What Once Was"	2016	Songs of Her's
"Marcel"	2016	Songs of Her's
"Speed Racer"	2017	Songs of Her's
"I'll Try"	2017	Songs of Her's
"Loving You" (Minnie Riperton cover)	2017	Non-album single
"Love on the Line (Call Now)"	2018	Invitation to Her's
"Low Beam"	2018	Invitation to Her's
"Harvey"	2018	Invitation to Her's
"Under Wraps"	2018	Invitation to Her's

=== Music videos ===
Year	Title	Director
2017	"Speed Racer"	Samuel O'Brien
2018	"Under Wraps"	Jorge A. Ramos
2019	"Harvey"	James Embrey
2019	"She Needs Him"	Sébastien Séjourné
2020	"Marcel"	Camille Laading
