= Frederick Hervey =

Frederick Hervey may refer to:

- Frederick Hervey, 4th Earl of Bristol (1730–1803)
- Frederick Hervey, 1st Marquess of Bristol (1769–1859)
- Frederick Hervey, 2nd Marquess of Bristol (1800–1864)
- Frederick Hervey, 3rd Marquess of Bristol (1834–1907)
- Frederick Hervey, 4th Marquess of Bristol (1863–1951)
- John Hervey, 7th Marquess of Bristol (Frederick William John Augustus Hervey, 1954–1999)
- Frederick Hervey, 8th Marquess of Bristol (born 1979)

== See also ==
- Fred Harvey (disambiguation)
