= Alexandre de Betak =

French fashion and furniture designer

Alexandre de Betak (born October 5, 1968) is a French fashion and furniture designer.

In 2000, de Betak began his involvement in the production of Victoria's Secret shows, producing and choreographing their shows for many years. De Betak is known for his 15-minute shows. 2003 marked his debut in design, when he created an acrylic glass bookshelf and a leather bench with French design house Domeau & Perez.

De Betak has two children with his partner at that time, actress and model Audrey Marnay.
