= Harvey's Butter Rum Batter =

American confection company

- Industry: Food and drink
- Founded: 1952; 73 years ago
- Founder: Harvey Hudson
- Headquarters: Bremerton, Washington, United States
- Products: Hot buttered rum drinks, food products
- Website: https://harveysbrb.com/

Harvey's Butter Rum Batter is an American confectionary company that specializes in batter used for hot buttered rum drinks and other food products. The company was founded in 1952, with headquarters in Bremerton, Washington.

== History ==
Company founder Harvey Hudson was born in Idaho and married Mildred Annette Cook. They moved to Bremerton and worked at Master Hatters.

While working as a bartender at a local bar, Hudson disliked the bar's batter, so he created one, which customers began buying from him. He later showed his recipe to the public, creating the brand of butter rum batter. He partnered with Darigold to create a factory in 1960.

Hudson died in 2011, aged 94. His company was acquired by Stacy Ryan, who had been handling mail orders out of state. Ryan and her family expanded the range of products by adding popcorn and syrup using the base of the batter mix.
