= Harvey Freeman =

Harvey Freeman may refer to:

- Harvey Freeman (baseball) (1897–1970), American baseball player
- Harvey Freeman (EastEnders), fictional character
