= John Hervey =

John Hervey may refer to:

- John Hervey (c.1353-c.1411), MP for Bedfordshire
- John Hervey, 1st Earl of Bristol (1665–1751), Member of Parliament (MP) for Bury St Edmunds
- John Hervey, 2nd Baron Hervey (1696–1743), son of the above, also MP for Bury St Edmunds
- John Hervey, 7th Marquess of Bristol (1954–1999), descendant of the above
- John Hervey, Lord Hervey (1757–1796), British diplomat
- John Hervey (died 1680) (1616–1680), English courtier and politician
- John Hervey (1696-1764), British MP for Wallingford and Reigate
- John L. Hervey (1870–1947), American equine historian
- John Bethell Hervey (1928-2016), Rear Admiral of the Royal Navy

== See also ==
- John Harvey (disambiguation)
