= Harvey Parker =

Harvey Parker may refer to:

- Harvey D. Parker (1805–1884), Boston hotel owner
- Harvey Parker (politician) (1834–1892), lumber merchant and politician in Quebec

== See also ==
- Harvey Pekar, American underground comic book writer
