= Harvey Kaye (university administrator) =

Harvey Kaye is former provost and CEO of Touro University, a Jewish-sponsored medical sciences university in California founded by Dr. Bernard Lander.

A native New Yorker, Dr. Kaye began his association with Touro as Associate Vice President for Education and Special Assistant to President Bernard Lander. In July 2006, Dr. Kaye was promoted to Provost and Chief Executive Officer of the Touro University-California and Touro University Nevada campuses. He also held a University-wide post as Accrediting Liaison Officer, for the Accrediting Commission for Senior Colleges and Universities for the Western Association of Schools and Colleges. At the Touro University-California Campus, Dr. Kaye served as the Dean of the College of Education (COE). He held the academic rank of full professor for the COE.
