= Harvey (1950 film) =

1950 film by Henry Koster

- Theatrical release poster
- Directed by: Henry Koster
- Screenplay by: Mary Chase; Oscar Brodney; Myles Connolly (uncredited)
- Based on: Harvey by Mary Chase
- Produced by: John Beck
- Starring: James Stewart; Josephine Hull; Charles Drake; Cecil Kellaway; Jesse White; Victoria Horne; Wallace Ford; Peggy Dow
- Cinematography: William Daniels
- Edited by: Ralph Dawson
- Music by: Frank Skinner
- Production company: Universal-International
- Distributed by: Universal Pictures
- Release dates: December 4, 1950 (Brazil); December 21, 1950 (United States)
- Running time: 104 minutes
- Country: United States
- Language: English
- Box office: $2.6 million (US rentals)

Harvey is a 1950 American fantasy comedy-drama film directed by Henry Koster, based on the 1944 play by Mary Chase. It stars James Stewart, Josephine Hull, Charles Drake, Cecil Kellaway, Jesse White, Victoria Horne, Wallace Ford, and Peggy Dow. The story centers on a man whose best friend is a púca named Harvey, a 6 ft 3 1/2 in (1.92 m) tall white invisible rabbit, and the ensuing debacle when the man's sister tries to have him committed to a sanatorium.

== Plot ==
Elwood P. Dowd is an amiable but eccentric man whose best friend is an invisible, 6 ft 3 1/2 in-tall (1.92 m) white rabbit named Harvey. As described by Elwood, Harvey is a púca, a benign but mischievous creature from Celtic mythology. Elwood spends most of his time taking Harvey around town, drinking at various bars and introducing Harvey to almost everyone he meets, much to the puzzlement of strangers although Elwood's friends have accepted Harvey's (supposed) existence. His older sister Veta and his niece Myrtle Mae live with him in his large estate, but have become social outcasts along with Elwood due to his obsession with Harvey.

After Elwood ruins a party Veta secretly arranged to present Myrtle Mae to society, Veta finally tries to have him committed to a local sanatorium. In exasperation, she admits to the attending psychiatrist, Dr. Sanderson, that she sees Harvey once in a while herself. Mistaking Veta for the real mental case, Sanderson has Elwood released and Veta locked up. Dr. Chumley, head of the sanatorium, discovers the mistake and realizes he must bring Elwood back, searching the town with Wilson, an orderly. With Veta's help, Chumley eventually tracks Elwood to his favorite bar, Charlie's, and confronts him.

Four hours later, Wilson returns to the sanatorium and learns from Sanderson and nurse Kelly that Chumley and Elwood had not returned. They all go to Charlie's and find Elwood alone; he explains that Chumley wandered off with Harvey after several rounds of drinks. As they converse, Elwood encourages Sanderson and Kelly to dance, rekindling their romantic relationship. Elwood eventually explains that he met Harvey one night several years earlier after escorting a drunk friend to a taxi, and they had since enjoyed going to bars and socializing with other patrons to hear their grand life stories and aspirations. Convinced that Elwood is insane and may have harmed Chumley, Wilson calls the police and has Elwood escorted back to the sanatorium.

Chumley returns to the sanatorium disheveled and paranoid, and is followed by an invisible presence who opens and closes locked doors. When the others arrive, Chumley invites Elwood to his office. In private, Chumley says that he now knows Harvey is real, and Elwood explains Harvey's various powers, including his ability to stop time, send anyone to any destination for as long as they like, and then bring them back without a minute passing. Chumley expresses his fantasy to go to Akron with a beautiful woman for two weeks. Veta arrives with Judge Gaffney and Myrtle Mae, prepared to commit Elwood, but are convinced by Sanderson that an injection of a serum called Formula 977 will stop Elwood from "seeing the rabbit".

As they prepare the injection, Veta tries to pay the taxi driver but, emptying her purse, is unable to find her smaller coin purse. She interrupts the injection procedure and asks Elwood to pay the driver. Warmed by Elwood's kindness, the taxi driver explains how he has driven many people to the sanatorium to receive the same formula, warning Veta that Elwood will soon become "a perfectly normal human being, and you know what stinkers they are." Veta is upset by this, and halts the injection; she then finds her coin purse, and realizes that Harvey had intervened to save her brother. Wilson and Myrtle Mae, who had met at Elwood's house, reveal that they have become a couple, and Elwood invites Wilson over for tomorrow night's dinner.

Leaving the sanatorium, Elwood sees Harvey on the porch swing. Harvey tells him that he has decided to stay and take Chumley on his fantasy trip to Akron. Dejected, Elwood walks out the gate, but when it is closed, he sees Harvey coming back. The gate lever is then moved to the open position by an unseen force. Elwood happily says, "Well, thank you, Harvey; I prefer you, too", and they follow Veta and Myrtle Mae along the road and into the sunrise.

== Cast ==
- James Stewart as Elwood P. Dowd
- Josephine Hull as Veta Louise Simmons
- Peggy Dow as Miss Kelly
- Charles Drake as Dr. Sanderson
- Cecil Kellaway as Dr. Chumley
- Victoria Horne as Myrtle Mae Simmons
- Jesse White as Wilson
- William Lynn as Judge Gaffney
- Wallace Ford as E. J. Lofgren, the taxi driver
- Nana Bryant as Mrs. Chumley
- Grace Mills as Aunt Ethel
- Clem Bevans as Mr. Shimelplatzer, the gatekeeper

In addition, "Harvey as Himself" is shown in an on-screen credit as the final shot of the film.

== Reception ==
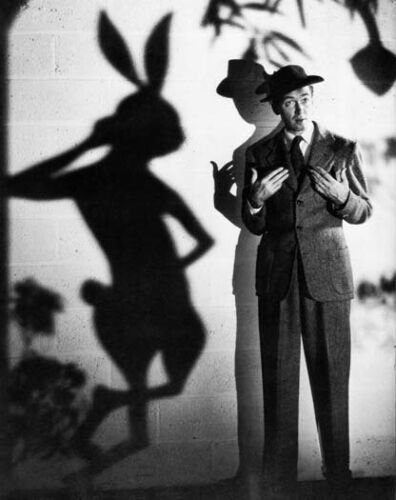
James Stewart in a promotional photo advertising the film

Reviews from critics were mostly positive. Bosley Crowther of The New York Times wrote that "so freely flowing is the screenplay which Mrs. Chase and Oscar Brodney have prepared, so vivid and droll is the direction which Henry Koster has given it and, particularly, so darling is the acting of James Stewart, Josephine Hull and all the rest that a virtually brand new experience is still in store for even those who saw the play." Variety wrote that the play "loses little of its whimsical comedy charm in the screen translation", and that Stewart "would seem the perfect casting for the character so well does he convey the idea that escape from life into a pleasant half-world existence has many points in its favor." Harrison's Reports wrote, "A brief synopsis cannot do justice to the humor in the story, much of it delightful and some of it hilarious. Stewart is excellent in the leading role; his casual ease and amiability, and the quiet manner in which he explains his relationship with 'Harvey,' are fascinating." Richard L. Coe of The Washington Post called it "one of the most beguiling comedies possible ... I'm certain you'll admire the able playing of Stewart and the marvelous out-of-this-world perplexity of the superb Mrs. Hull. Both are Academy Award performances."

John McCarten of The New Yorker called it "a movie that only a case-hardened wowser would fail to find beguiling. Even if you saw the play, I don't think your familiarity with the alcoholic hallucinations of Elwood P. Dowd, the hero, will diminish your enjoyment of the film, and though James Stewart, who plays Dowd in the picture, doesn't bring to his part all the battered authority of Frank Fay, the originator of the role, he nevertheless succeeds in making plausible the notion that Harvey, the rabbit, would accept him as a pal." The Monthly Film Bulletin was less positive, writing that "Harvey himself scarcely begins to exist for the audience until the last few minutes. In his absence, the humours that can be extracted from the more obvious aspects of lunacy or suspected lunacy are wrung rather dry."

TV Guide says James Stewart gave "one of his finest performances in this lighthearted film", and it currently has five out of five stars on their site. On the review aggregator website Rotten Tomatoes, 87% of 30 critics' reviews are positive, with an average rating of 7.6/10.

Stewart took a percentage of the profits. In 1953, William Goetz estimated that Stewart had earned $200,000 from the film, equivalent to $2.41 million in 2025.

== Home media ==
In March 1990, Stewart recorded a special narrative introduction, which was combined with many of the film's still photos and added to the film's original release on VHS. MCA Home Video released Harvey on VHS in 1990. The special narrative introduction also appears on at least one DVD release of the film.

== Awards and honors ==
| Award | Category | Nominee(s) | Result |
|---|---|---|---|
| Academy Awards | Best Actor | James Stewart | Nominated |
| Academy Awards | Best Supporting Actress | Josephine Hull | Won |
| Golden Globe Awards | Best Motion Picture – Drama | | Nominated |
| Golden Globe Awards | Best Actor in a Motion Picture – Drama | James Stewart | Nominated |
| Golden Globe Awards | Best Supporting Actress – Motion Picture | Josephine Hull | Won |
| Hugo Awards | Best Dramatic Presentation | Henry Koster, Oscar Brodney, Myles Connolly and Mary Chase | Nominated |

James Stewart later declared in an interview that Josephine Hull had the most difficult role in the film, since she had to believe and not believe in the invisible rabbit... at the same time.

The film is recognized by American Film Institute in these lists:

- 2000: AFI's 100 Years...100 Laughs – #35
- 2005: AFI's 100 Years...100 Movie Quotes:
  - Elwood P. Dowd: "Well, I've wrestled with reality for thirty five years, Doctor, and I’m happy to state I finally won out over it." – Nominated
- 2008: AFI's 10 Top 10:
  - #7 Fantasy Film

== In popular culture ==
=== Remakes ===
The play/film was made for television several times:

- 1958, in a version starring Art Carney as Elwood, and Marion Lorne, Larry Blyden, Elizabeth Montgomery, Fred Gwynne, Charlotte Rae, and Jack Weston.
- 1970, in a version for West German television called Mein Freund Harvey, with Heinz Rühmann as Elwood.
- 1972, in a version also starring James Stewart with Helen Hayes as his sister Veta, Jesse White reprising his role as Duane Wilson, and Fred Gwynne.
- 1985, in a version for West German television, with Harald Juhnke as Elwood and Elisabeth Wiedemann as Veta.
- 1996, starring Harry Anderson and Swoosie Kurtz in the Elwood and Veta roles along with Leslie Nielsen and William Schallert.

Producer Don Gregory purchased the merchandising and film rights to Harvey from the Mary Chase estate in 1996. In April 1999, Gregory sold the rights to Miramax Films, who beat out several high-profile bidders, including Walt Disney Pictures (represented by the producing team Barry Sonnenfeld and Barry Josephson), Universal Pictures and New Line Cinema. However, Miramax still intended to have Gregory produce Harvey. Universal was interested in having Harvey with Jim Carrey starring and Tom Shadyac directing, while New Line saw it as an Adam Sandler movie. Harvey Weinstein of Miramax was also considering Carrey and Sandler, as well as Tom Hanks. Weinstein wanted Harvey to be set in a modern setting. Weinstein eventually took the project to Dimension Films, who partnered with Metro-Goldwyn-Mayer to co-finance. Craig Mazin was hired by Dimension in November 2001 to adapt the screenplay. John Travolta entered negotiations to star in March 2003, but the rights for Dimension and MGM lapsed, which were picked up by 20th Century Fox in 2008. Jonathan Tropper was hired to write the script, which, in August 2009, drew interest from Steven Spielberg as director. As a result, Spielberg pushed back development for an Abraham Lincoln biopic (which was released in 2012); a remake of Oldboy and an adaptation of The 39 Clues. It was then announced that Harvey would be a joint 50/50 production between 20th Century Fox and Spielberg's DreamWorks, with Spielberg and Gregory also set to produce the film. Tom Hanks, who previously worked with Spielberg on Saving Private Ryan, Catch Me If You Can and The Terminal, was considered for the lead role. Spielberg had also approached Robert Downey Jr., but in December 2009 Spielberg opted out after a dispute over his vision for the project.

In December 2018, it was reported that streaming service Netflix had started developing a version of Harvey.

=== In popular culture ===
The Jimmy Stewart Museum, based in Stewart's hometown of Indiana, Pennsylvania, presents the Harvey Award to a distinguished celebrity tied to Stewart's spirit of humanitarianism. Past recipients include Robert Wagner, Shirley Jones, Janet Leigh, and Rich Little.

A 1971 children's film, Mr. Horatio Knibbles, also starred a giant talking rabbit, visible only to one person.

The 1977 comic book story, "The Harvey Pekar Name Story," written by Harvey Pekar and illustrated by Robert Crumb, alludes to the play/film when Pekar describes how childhood acquaintances made fun of his name by calling him "Harvey the Rabbit."

The 2001 film Donnie Darko contains a six-foot tall rabbit named Frank, which haunts the titular character. Despite popular belief that this character was a reference to Harvey, Donnie Darko's writer/director Richard Kelly denies it. In an interview with Future Movies, he is quoted as saying: "I have never even seen the movie, it never occurred to me." In 2002, the Aero Theatre in Santa Monica programmed Harvey and Donnie Darko as a double feature.

British musicians Dan le sac Vs Scoobius Pip referenced the film in their song "Waiting for the Beat to Kick in", in which Pip talks of meeting Elwood P. Dowd and quotes from the movie.

The British indie rock band Her's included a song named "Harvey" based on the film on their 2018 debut album Invitation to Her's. Harvey was one of lead singer Stephen Fitzpatrick's favorite films.

In 2019, the thirteenth episode of John Green's podcast The Anthropocene Reviewed featured the film, and an essay on the film was also included in Green's book of the same title published in 2021. In the essay he describes an episode of severe clinical depression, which led to him resigning from his job, upon which his boss told him "Watch Harvey". He writes how the film helped him to get well, and that he was eventually able to return to his job at Booklist magazine.

== See also ==
- "The Unicorn in the Garden", a 1939 short story by James Thurber to which the film alludes
