= Harvey Shapiro =

Harvey Shapiro may refer to:

- Harvey Shapiro (cellist) (1911–2007), American cellist
- Harvey Shapiro (poet) (1924–2013), American poet and editor of The New York Times
- Harvey Shapiro (baseball), American baseball coach
