= Harvey Bullock =

Harvey Bullock may refer to:

- Harvey Bullock (writer) (1921–2006), American television and film writer and producer
- Harvey Bullock (character), DC Comics character
