= Hervé Cuillandre =

French novelist and photographer

Hervé Cuillandre (born 1967) is a French novelist and photographer, Engie digital project manager, CESER Île-de-France regional advisor, lecturer at the University of Paris Dauphine

Cuillandre was born in Rennes, France.

== Bibliography ==
- Transparence salariale: Guide de mise en conformité des entreprises françaises (Nonfiction - 2019)
- Vive les imbéciles ! L'humanité ne pourra jamais s'en passer (Nonfiction - 2019)
- Après l'intelligence artificielle et la robotisation : remettre l'humain au coeur du monde (Nonfiction - 2019)
- Un monde meilleur: Et si l'intellignce artificielle humanisait notre avenir (Nonfiction - 2018)
- Elsewhere (Photography - 2007)
- L'humanité en mouvement (Nonfiction - 2006)
- L'entreprise sociale (Nonfiction - 2006)
- La gestion de projet (Nonfiction - 2006)
- Les flammes de l'enfer (Fiction - 2005)
- Une nuit au bureau (Fiction - 2004)
