= Hervé Paillet =

French painter

Hervé Paillet (born 1968) is a French athlete actor and painter born with atrophied legs.

== Life ==
He is the fifth child of his family. His legs were amputated when he was three years old, and he uses a wheelchair. Eventually he learned to run with his arms and became a weightlifter. As a teenager he won a silver medal in weightlifting at the 1984 Summer Paralympics. He participated in two more Paralympic Games in 1992 and 1996 as a powerlifter. In both 1994 and 1995 he won a French weightlifting championship.

Paillet is married and he has two daughters.
