= Walter Lowrie Hervey =

American educator (1862–1952)

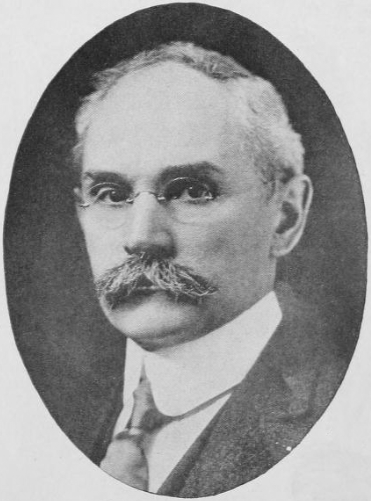
- Born: 1862; Mount Vernon, Ohio, US
- Died: October 14, 1952 (aged 89–90); New York, New York, US
- Education: Princeton University
- Occupation: Educator

Walter Lowrie Hervey, Ph.D. (1862 – October 14, 1952) was an American educator born in Mount Vernon, Ohio. He graduated from Princeton in 1886, earned his MA there in 1889 and his PhD in 1892.

He was acting president of Teachers College, Columbia University from 1891 to 1892, and then assumed the role in a permanent capacity until 1897.

In 1898, he became a member of the board of examiners of the New York City Department of Education and he served there until he retired in 1932.

He edited the Horace Mann Readers, lectured and wrote articles on education, and was the author of:

- Picture Work (1896)
- Daily Lesson Plans (1912)
- Introductory Second Reader (1914)

He had a son, Walter Bryant Hervey.

Walter Lowrie Hervey died at his home in Manhattan on October 15, 1952.
