= Harve =

Harve is a masculine given name. Notable people with the name include:

- Harve Bennett (1930–2015), American television and film producer and screenwriter
- Harve Brosten (born 1943), American screenwriter
- Harve A. Oliphant (1912–1998), American football coach
- Harve Pierre, American musician
- Harve Presnell (1933–2009), American actor and singer
- Harve Tibbott (1885–1969), American politician
- harve (born 2004), Maltese Cosplayer
