= Harvey Einbinder =

American physicist and author

Harvey Einbinder (June 18, 1926 – January 30, 2013) was an American physicist, author and amateur historian.

== Early life ==
Einbinder was born to Jacob B. Einbinder and Dora (née Abelson) in New Haven, Connecticut. He had one brother, David, and one sister, Hinde.

== Education ==
Einbinder studied for two years at the University of Connecticut (UConn), at first physics but then mathematics in which he received a degree with "highest distinction" in 1946. He later received his Ph.D. in physics from Columbia University.

== Career ==
He became a consultant to the Cornell Aeronautical Laboratory and to General Electric on the Atlas missile. He published papers on hypersonic aerodynamics and the ionization of solid particles. Einbinder patented a ten-finger typewriter keyboard.

== Encyclopædia Britannica ==
Einbinder spent five years combing the Encyclopædia Britannica for flaws, and found enough to fill a 390-page book, called The Myth of the Britannica, published by Grove Press in 1964. As summarized by The Age two years later, Einbinder's book "showed beyond argument that the Britannica was not a completely impartial and absolutely infallible work of general reference; that 666 articles in the 1963 edition were reprinted from editions dating back to 1875 in some cases; and that American influence on its editorial policy had become dominant". The Science Magazine commended Einbinder as a "dedicated prince of iconoclasts" who "rips into his subject from all angles and with devastating effect". Furthermore, it was suggested that the editorial board of the Encyclopædia Britannica hire Einbinder as a fact-checker, although this never came to be.

Einbinder at one point also disputed the historical accuracy of the Black Hole of Calcutta account. Among his other publications are An American Genius: Frank Lloyd Wright, and the play Mah Name is Lyndon (about US president Lyndon B. Johnson and the Vietnam War).

== Private life ==
Harvey Einbinder was married to Florence Einbinder, who predeceased him. He died on January 30, 2013, at Mt. Sinai Hospital in New York City.

== Publications ==
- The Myth of the Britannica.

New York: Grove Press, 1964
London: MacGibbon & Kee, 1964
New York: Johnson Reprint Corp., 1972

- De Solla Price, Derek J. (1964)."A Great Encyclopedia Doesn't Have To Be Good?". (Extract) Science, Volume 144, Issue 3619, pp. 665–666. ISSN 0036-8075 (print), 1095-9203 (online). DOI: 10.1126/science.144.3619.665 –

Review of Einbinder's The Myth of the Britannica.

- "The Target Is Large and the Fees Are Picayune; THE MYTH OF THE BRITANNICA. By Harvey Einbinder. 390 pp. New York: Grove Press. $7.50". The New York Times. February 2, 1964.

Review of Einbinder's The Myth of the Britannica.

- "Politics and the new Britannica", The Nation 220:11:342-4 (1975) –

Review of the Britannica 3

- An American genius : Frank Lloyd Wright. New York : Philosophical Library, 1986, ISBN 0-8022-2511-X
- Mah name is Lyndon; a play. Illustrated by Florence Safadi. New York, Lady Bird Press. 1968
