= Invitation to Her's =

Studio album by Her's
- Released: 24 August 2018
- Genres: Post-punk; new wave
- Length: 45:47
- Label: Heist or Hit
- Producers: Her's; Saam Jafarzadeh

Her's chronology
Songs of Her's (2017)	Invitation to Her's (2018)

Singles from Invitation to Her's
- 1. "Love on the Line (Call Now)" Released: 28 March 2018; 2. "Low Beam" Released: 25 May 2018; 3. "Harvey" Released: 5 July 2018; 4. "Under Wraps" Released: 16 August 2018

Invitation to Her's is the only studio album by English indie rock band Her's. It was released on 24 August 2018 through Heist or Hit Records, seven months before the duo were killed in a car crash while touring the US.

== Critical reception ==
Professional ratings
Aggregate scores
Source	Rating
Metacritic	70/100
Review scores
Source	Rating
DIY	3/5 stars
Gigwise	9/10 stars
The Line of Best Fit	8/10
Q	4/5 stars
The Skinny	3/5 stars
Uncut	6/10

Invitation to Her's received generally positive reviews from critics. Laviea Thomas of Gigwise said the album was "well-thought-out" and "atmospheric" and featured "some almost perfect glitch pop ballads". Nad Khan of The Line of Best Fit stated, "Each track is its own little microcosm of oddness, unfolding like a brightly colored cartoon storyboard", and "Ultimately, the album is a warm, fuzzy and familiar affair, succeeding in its primary mission to marry peculiar humour with genuinely catchy pop melodies."

Joe Goggins of DIY called the album "a handsome collection of love songs" and said, "Invitation to Her's is an occasionally jarring listen, thanks to its stylistic restlessness, but there's enough substance behind the silliness to leave you feeling they're following through on their early promise." Emily Mackay of The Guardian praised the "retro charms with pastel-toned production" of "Harvey" and "If You Know What's Right", the former based on a James Stewart film of the same name. In The Skinny, Eugenie Johnson said, "Almost every track here is loaded with a chorus that swoons or soars, burying and sticking in the mind" but that "by its closing tracks though, the relative lack of shade to balance the bubblegum-coloured light can become a bit cloying".

== Track listing ==
No.	Title	Length
1.	"Harvey"	3:31
2.	"Mannie's Smile"	3:40
3.	"If You Know What's Right"	3:20
4.	"Carry the Doubt"	4:41
5.	"Low Beam"	4:28
6.	"Breathing Easy"	4:49
7.	"Blue Lips"	3:42
8.	"She Needs Him"	5:14
9.	"Love on the Line (Call Now)"	3:10
10.	"Don't Think It Over"	4:06
11.	"Under Wraps"	5:03
Total length:		45:47

== Personnel ==
Her's

- Stephen Fitzpatrick – guitars, vocals, drum programming
- Audun Laading – bass guitar, backing vocals, drum programming

Additional personnel

- Saam Jafarzadeh – production
