= CERIMES =

Former French government agency

The Centre de ressources et d'informations sur les multimédias pour l'enseignement supérieur, commonly known by its acronym CERIMES, formerly Service du film de recherche scientifique (SFRS) and also known as SFRS-CERIMES, was a French statutory body that provided films and other media for use in higher education. It was disbanded on 31 December 2014.

== History ==
The Service du film de recherche scientifique (SFRS) was founded in 1954 as a non-profit association, on the initiative of the Conseil supérieur de la recherche scientifique, and was attached to the Ministry of National Education in 1959. Filmmaker Hervé Lièvre became its director in December 1994 and led the 2005 transformation into CERIMES, of which he was the only director until its closure.

A new website was created in September 2003, in which its name was displayed as SFRS–CERIMES, a name which persisted in citations to the organisation. It was an agency of the Ministry of Higher Education and Research, and associated with the Centre national de documentation pédagogique (National Centre for Educational Documentation). The SFRS officially became CERIMES (Centre de ressources et d'informations sur les multimédias pour l'enseignement supérieur) with the publication, in the Journal officiel of 20 August 2005, several years after the change having been announced.

CERIMES was wound up on 31 December 2014. The resources for which it was previously responsible, Canal-U, BibNum, and the entire collection of documentaries would be transferred to the Fondation Maison des sciences de l'homme (FMSH), and the "Library Bookmarks" were taken over by Agence bibliographique de l'enseignement supérieur (Abes).

== Description ==
CERIMES was the official centre of multimedia information resources for higher education. It was located at 6 Avenue Pasteur, Vanves.

It produced or distributed films, DVDs, videos, online databases, podcasts, and other multimedia sources covering science and technology and the social sciences. It thus included subjects such as astronomy, biology, economics, environmental studies, French studies, genetics, medicine, physics, and psychology. Among other resources, SFRS-CERIMES held more than 500 online lectures of the University of All Knowledges (UTLS).

It was also responsible for the resources known as Canal-U (a joint project by French universities, managed by CERIMES), BibNum, and "Library Bookmarks" (Signets de la Bibliothèque nationale de France, a service begun in 2004).
