= 2002 in literature =

This article contains information about the literary events and publications of 2002.

== Events ==
- March 16 – Authorities in Saudi Arabia arrest and jail the poet Abdul Mohsen Musalam and dismiss a newspaper editor following the publication of Musalam's poem "The Corrupt on Earth", which criticizes the state's Islamic judiciary, accusing some judges of being corrupt and issuing unfair rulings for personal benefit.
- March 31 – American Writers: A Journey Through History resumes its run on C-SPAN, having been interrupted by the September 11 attacks and their aftermath.
- May – The results of a poll of 100 authors conducted in Norway are announced, leading to the Bokklubben World Library beginning publication.
- October 16 – Bibliotheca Alexandrina (designed by Snøhetta) is inaugurated in Alexandria, Egypt.
- November – Raymond Benson releases his final James Bond novel, based on the film Die Another Day, bringing to a close an uninterrupted series of novels featuring Ian Fleming's character that started in 1981.
- December – The Randell Cottage Writers' Residency is established in Wellington for New Zealand and French authors.

== New books ==
=== Fiction ===
- Alaa Al Aswany – The Yacoubian Building (عمارة يعقوبيان, ʿImārat Yaʿqūbīān)
- Aaron Allston – Enemy Lines: Rebel Dream and Enemy Lines: Rebel Stand
- Jean M. Auel – The Shelters of Stone
- Paul Auster – The Book of Illusions
- Iain Banks – Dead Air
- Greg Bear – Vitals
- Raymond Benson – Die Another Day and The Man with the Red Tattoo
- Viken Berberian – The Cyclist
- Nelson Bond – The Far Side of Nowhere
- William Boyd – Any Human Heart
- Mircea Cărtărescu – The Encyclopedia of Dragons (Enciclopedia zmeilor)
- Stephen L. Carter – The Emperor of Ocean Park
- Ted Chiang – Stories of Your Life and Others
- Bernard Cornwell – Sharpe's Prey, Sharpe's Skirmish and Vagabond
- Michael Crichton – Prey
- Elaine Cunningham – Dark Journey
- Jeffery Deaver – The Stone Monkey
- Dan Doboș – The Abbey
- L. Sprague de Camp – Aristotle and the Gun and Other Stories
- Dave Eggers – You Shall Know Our Velocity
- Jeffrey Eugenides – Middlesex
- Janet Evanovich – Hard Eight
- Michel Faber – The Crimson Petal and the White
- Giorgio Faletti – Io uccido
- Mick Farren – Underland
- Nancy Farmer – The House of The Scorpion
- Elena Ferrante – I giorni dell'abbandono (The Days of Abandonment)
- Jonathan Safran Foer – Everything Is Illuminated
- Ken Follett – Hornet Flight
- Alan Dean Foster – The Approaching Storm
- Neil Gaiman – Coraline
- Julia Glass – Three Junes
- Horace L. Gold and L. Sprague de Camp – None But Lucifer
- Jean-Christophe Grangé – Le Concile de pierre
- Niall Griffiths – Sheepshagger
- John Grisham – The Summons
- Margaret Peterson Haddix – Among the Betrayed
- Peter Handke – Crossing the Sierra de Gredos
- Joanne Harris – Coastliners
- John D. Harvey – The Cleansing
- Aleksandar Hemon – Nowhere Man
- Carl Hiaasen – Hoot
- Rabee Jaber – رحلة الغرناطي (Rahlat al-Gharnati, "The Journey of the Granadian")
- Stephen King – Everything's Eventual: 14 Dark Tales and From a Buick 8
- Rachel Klein – The Moth Diaries
- Dean R. Koontz – By the Light of the Moon and One Door Away from Heaven
- Ursula K. Le Guin – The Birthday of the World (anthology including Paradises Lost)
- Sallie Lowenstein – Sender Unknown
- Robert Ludlum – The Sigma Protocol
- Jon McGregor – If Nobody Speaks of Remarkable Things
- Valerio Massimo Manfredi – The Last Legion
- Javier Marías – Your Face Tomorrow Volume 1: Fever and Spear (Tu rostro mañana 1. Fiebre y lanza)
- Rohinton Mistry – Family Matters
- Haruki Murakami (村上 春樹) – Kafka on the Shore (海辺のカフカ, Umibe no Kafuka)
- Taslima Nasrin – Forashi Premik (French Lover)
- Joseph O'Connor – Star of the Sea
- Chuck Palahniuk – Lullaby
- Orhan Pamuk – Snow
- Ann Patchett – Bel Canto
- James Patterson – Beach House
- Terry Pratchett – Night Watch
- Libby Purves – Mother Country
- Pascal Quignard – Les Ombres errantes
- Kathy Reichs – Grave Secrets
- Nora Roberts – Face the Fire
- Joel C. Rosenberg – The Last Jihad
- R. A. Salvatore – Star Wars Episode II: Attack of the Clones
- Andrzej Sapkowski – The Tower of Fools
- Samanta Schweblin – El núcleo del disturbio
- Alice Sebold – The Lovely Bones
- Carol Shields – Unless
- Vladimir Sorokin – Ice
- Danielle Steel – The Cottage
- David Storey – As It Happened
- Matthew Stover – Traitor
- Thomas Sullivan – Born Burning
- Donna Tartt – The Little Friend
- Hồ Anh Thái – Cõi người rung chuông tận thế (The Apocalypse Bell Tolls in the Human World)
- William Trevor – The Story of Lucy Gault
- Andrew Vachss – Only Child
- Guy Vanderhaeghe – The Last Crossing
- Barbara Vine – The Blood Doctor
- Sarah Waters – Fingersmith
- Darren Williams – Angel Rock
- Walter Jon Williams – Destiny's Way
- Roger Zelazny – The Last Defender of Camelot

=== Children and young people ===
- Chris Van Allsburg – Zathura
- Neil Gaiman – Coraline
- Bob Graham – Jethro Byrd, Fairy Child
- Kathleen Hague (with Michael Hague) – Good Night, Fairies
- Isabel Hoving – The Dream Merchant
- Tony Johnston (with Barry Moser) – That Summer
- Ulrich Karger – Geisterstunde im Kindergarten (Ghost Times in Kindergarten, translated as The Scary Sleepover)
- Gordon Korman – Son of the Mob
- Jenny Nimmo – Midnight for Charlie Bone
- Margie Palatini (with Barry Moser) – Earthquack!
- Christopher Paolini (with John Jude Palencar) – Eragon (first in The Inheritance Cycle of four books)
- Jerry Pinkney
  - The Nightingale
  - Noah's Ark
- Lemony Snicket – The Carnivorous Carnival
- Leander Watts – Stonecutter
- Jacqueline Wilson – Girls in Tears (fourth in the Girls series of four books)

=== Drama ===
- Edward Albee – The Goat, or Who Is Sylvia?
- Caryl Churchill – A Number
- Nilo Cruz – Anna in the Tropics
- Zlatko Topčić – Time Out
- Peter Verhelst – Blush

=== Poetry ===
- Neil Astley (ed.) – Staying Alive: real poems for unreal times (anthology)
- Jim Dodge – Rain on the River
- Linton Kwesi Johnson – Mi Revalueshanary Fren
- Grazyna Miller – Alibi of a butterfly

=== Non-fiction ===
- Andrew Alpern – The New York Apartment Houses of Rosario Candela and James Carpenter
- Jeffrey Archer (as FF 8282) – A Prison Diary: Volume 1: Belmarsh: Hell
- T. J. Binyon – Pushkin: A Biography
- John Brockman (editor) – The Next Fifty Years: Science in the First Half of the Twenty-First Century
- Stuart Christie – Granny Made me an Anarchist
- Alphonse Daudet (died 1897), translated by Julian Barnes – In the Land of Pain (first English translation of La Doulou)
- Lindy Edwards – How to Argue with an Economist: Reopening Political Debate in Australia
- Koenraad Elst – Ayodhya – The Case Against the Temple
- Tye R. Farrell and Jeffrey Morrow – University of Psychogenic Fugue
- Aminatta Forna – The Devil That Danced on the Water: A Daughter's Quest
- Pim Fortuyn – De puinhopen van acht jaar Paars
- Michael J. Fox – Lucky Man: A Memoir
- Stephen J. Gould – I Have Landed
- B. B. Lal – The Sarasvatī Flows On: The Continuity of Indian Culture
- Judith Levine – Harmful to Minors
- Gabriel García Márquez – Vivir para contarla (autobiography)
- Anthea Paul – Girlosophy
- Jeremy Paxman – The Political Animal
- Neil Peart – Ghost Rider
- Åsne Seierstad – The Bookseller of Kabul (Bokhandlerem i Kabul)
- Arun Shourie – Worshipping False Gods
- Rachel Simon – Riding the Bus with My Sister
- Bob Smith – Hamlet's Dresser
- Daniel Snowman – The Hitler Émigrés: The Cultural Impact on Britain of Refugees from Nazism
- Paul Theroux – Dark Star Safari
- Rick Warren – The Purpose Driven Life
- Alison Watt – The Last Island

== Films ==
- Harry Potter and the Chamber of Secrets
- The Lord of the Rings: The Two Towers

== Deaths ==
- January 12 – Lady Violet Powell, British critic and biographer (born 1912)
- January 17 – Camilo José Cela, Nobel-winningSpanish writer (born 1916)
- January 28 – Astrid Lindgren, Swedish children's author (born 1907)
- February 8 – Joachim Hoffmann, German historian (born 1930)
- February 21 – A. L. Barker, English novelist (born 1918)
- February 27 – Spike Milligan, Indian-born British-Irish comedian, screenwriter and poet (born 1918)
- March 21 – Thomas Flanagan, American historical novelist (born 1923)
- April 6 – Martin Sperr, German dramatist (born 1944)
- April 24 – Ismith Khan, Trinidad-born novelist (born 1925)
- April 27 – George Alec Effinger, American science fiction author (born 1947)
- May 6 – Pim Fortuyn, Dutch political columnist and writer (born 1948)
- May 17 – Dave Berg, American cartoonist (born 1920)
- May 20 – Stephen J. Gould, American paleontologist, biologist and writer (born 1941)
- June 2 – Flora Lewis, American journalist (born 1922)
- June 13 – R. W. B. Lewis, American critic (born 1917)
- June 20
  - Timothy Findley, Canadian novelist and playwright (born 1930)
  - Kenneth Kantzer, American theologian (born 1917)
- June 24 – John Kincaid McNeillie (also Ian Niall), Scottish novelist and non-fiction writer (born 1916)
- July 23 – Chaim Potok, American writer (born 1929)
- August 25 – Dorothy Hewett, Australian poet and playwright (born 1923)
- September 17 – Eileen Colwell, English children's librarian (born 1904)
- September 20 – Joan Littlewood, English theatre director and biographer (born 1914)
- October 13 – Stephen E. Ambrose, American historian and biographer (born 1936)
- October 21 – Harbhajan Singh, Indian Punjabi poet and critic (born 1920)
- October 27 – Sesto Pals, Romanian Israeli poet and philosopher (cancer, born ca. 1912)
- October 28 – Sugathapala de Silva, Sri Lankan dramatist, novelist and translator writing in Sinhalese (born 1928)
- November 8 – Jon Elia, Pakistani poet and philosopher writing in Urdu (born 1931)
- December 12 – Dee Brown, American novelist and historian (born 1908)
- December 24 – Kjell Aukrust, Norwegian author, poet and artist (born 1920)

== Awards ==
- Nobel Prize for Literature: Imre Kertész

=== Australia ===
- The Australian/Vogel Literary Award: Danielle Wood, The Alphabet of Light and Dark
- C. J. Dennis Prize for Poetry: Robert Gray, Afterimages
- Kenneth Slessor Prize for Poetry: Alan Wearne, The Lovemakers
- Mary Gilmore Prize: Geraldine McKenzie, Duty
- Miles Franklin Award: Tim Winton, Dirt Music

=== Canada ===
- Giller Prize: Austin Clarke, The Polished Hoe
- See 2002 Governor General's Awards for a complete list of winners and finalists for those awards.
- Griffin Poetry Prize: Christian Bök, Eunoia and Alice Notley, Disobedience
- Edna Staebler Award for Creative Non-Fiction: Tom Allen, Rolling Home

=== France ===
- Prix Décembre: Pierre Michon, Abbés and Corps du Roi
- Prix Femina: Chantal Thomas, Les adieux à la reine
- Prix Femina (non-fiction): Michael Barry, Massoud
- Prix Goncourt: Pascal Quignard, Les Ombres errantes
- Prix Médicis French: Daniel Desmarquet, Kafka et les jeunes filles
- Prix Médicis Non-Fiction: Anne F. Garréta, Pas un jour
- Prix Médicis International: Philip Roth, The Human Stain

=== United Kingdom ===
- Booker Prize: Yann Martel, Life of Pi
- Caine Prize for African Writing: Binyavanga Wainaina, "Discovering Home"
- Carnegie Medal for children's literature: Sharon Creech, Ruby Holler
- James Tait Black Memorial Prize for fiction: Jonathan Franzen, The Corrections
- James Tait Black Memorial Prize for biography: Jenny Uglow, The Lunar Men: The Friends Who Made the Future 1730–1810
- Cholmondeley Award: Moniza Alvi, David Constantine, Liz Lochhead, Brian Patten
- Eric Gregory Award: Caroline Bird, Christopher James, Jacob Polley, Luke Heeley, Judith Lal, David Leonard Briggs, Eleanor Rees, Kathryn Simmonds
- Samuel Johnson Prize: Margaret MacMillan, Peacemakers: The Paris Peace Conference of 1919 and Its Attempt to End War
- Whitbread Best Book Award: Philip Pullman, The Amber Spyglass
- Orange Prize for Fiction: Ann Patchett, Bel Canto
- Queen's Gold Medal for Poetry: Peter Porter

=== United States ===
- Agnes Lynch Starrett Poetry Prize: Shao Wei, Pulling a Dragon's Teeth
- Aiken Taylor Award for Modern American Poetry: Grace Schulman
- Arthur Rense Prize for poetry: B.H. Fairchild
- Bernard F. Connors Prize for Poetry: Timothy Donnelly, “His Long Imprison'd Thought”
- Bobbitt National Prize for Poetry: Alice Fulton, Felt
- Brittingham Prize in Poetry: Anna George Meek, Acts of Contortion
- Compton Crook Award: Wen Spencer, Alien Taste
- Frost Medal: Galway Kinnell
- Hugo Award: Neil Gaiman, American Gods
- National Book Award for Fiction: Julia Glass, Three Junes
- National Book Critics Circle Award: Ian McEwan, Atonement
- Newbery Medal for children's literature: Linda Sue Park, A Single Shard
- PEN/Faulkner Award for Fiction: Ann Patchett, Bel Canto
- Pulitzer Prize for Drama: Suzan-Lori Parks, Topdog/Underdog
- Pulitzer Prize for Fiction: Richard Russo, Empire Falls
- Pulitzer Prize for Poetry: Carl Dennis, Practical Gods
- Wallace Stevens Award: Ruth Stone
- Whiting Awards:

Fiction: Jeffery Renard Allen, Justin Cronin, Kim Edwards, Michelle Huneven, Danzy Senna
Plays: Melissa James Gibson, Evan Smith
Poetry: Elizabeth Arnold, David Gewanter, Joshua Weiner

=== Other ===
- Camões Prize: Maria Velho da Costa
- Finlandia Prize: Kari Hotakainen Trench Street
- Friedenspreis des Deutschen Buchhandels: Chinua Achebe
- International Dublin Literary Award: Michel Houellebecq, Les Particules Élémentaires
- Macmillan Writers' Prize for Africa Adult Fiction: Yvonne Vera, Stone Virgins
- Premio Nadal: Ángela Vallvey, Los estados carenciales
- SAARC Literary Award: Laxmi Chand Gupta

== Notes ==
- Hahn, Daniel (2015). The Oxford Companion to Children's Literature (2nd ed.). Oxford. University Press. ISBN 9780198715542.
