= Helen Storey =

British fashion designer

Helen Storey is a British artist and designer living and working in London. She is professor of fashion science at the University of the Arts, London and co-director of The Helen Storey Foundation.

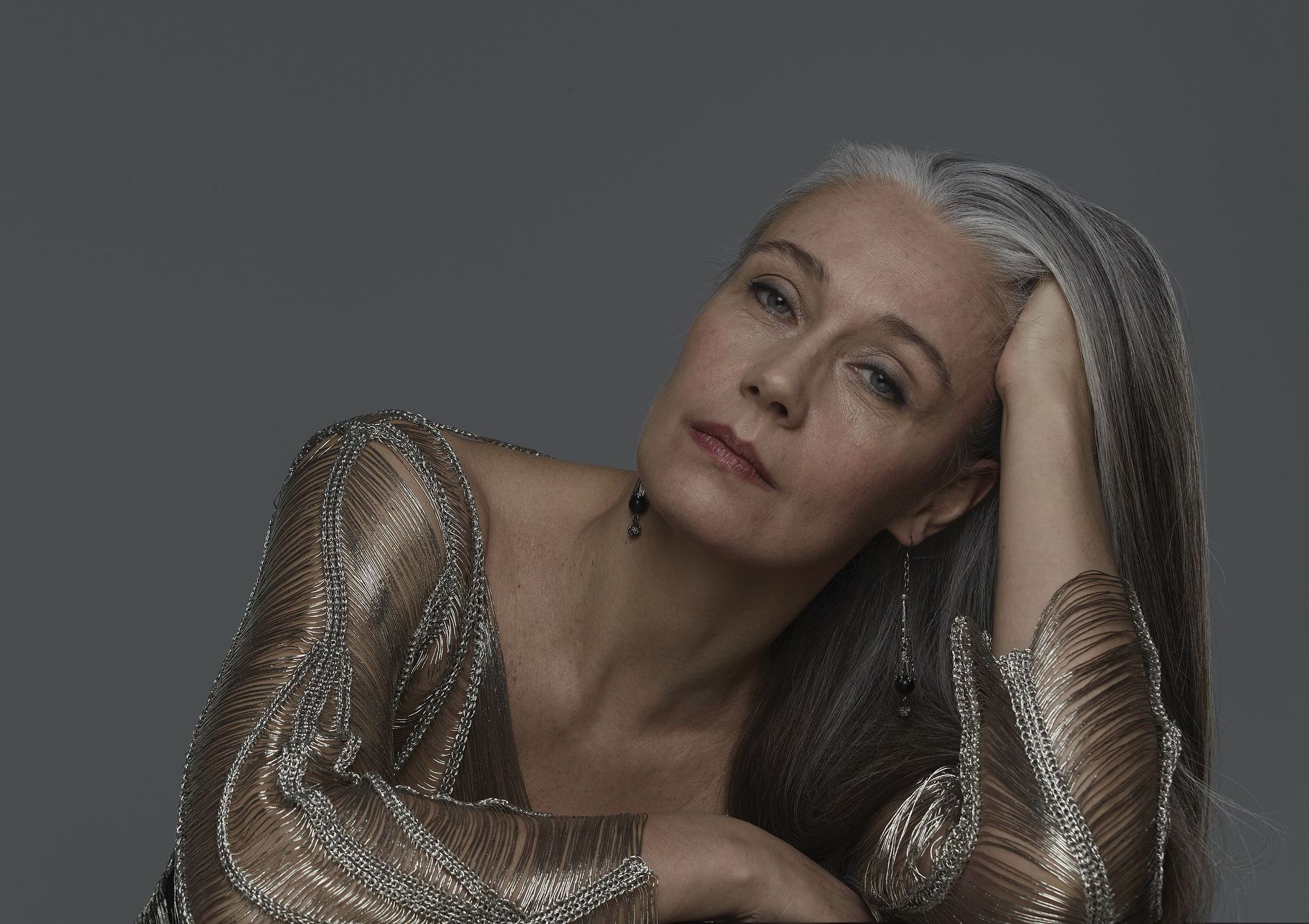
Helen Storey

== Background and education ==
Helen Storey attended Hampstead Comprehensive School in North London and graduated in Fashion from Kingston Polytechnic in 1981. She trained with Valentino and Lancetti in Rome before launching her own label in 1984. Her father is the late playwright and novelist David Storey.

== Career 1984 to 1997 ==
Between 1984 and 1995, Helen built her reputation in the fashion world. She was awarded Most Innovative Designer and Best Designer Exporter in 1990 and nominated for British Designer of the Year in 1990 and 1991. In 1994, Storey designed the dress worn by singer Frances Ruffelle when she performed the UK entry in the Eurovision Song Contest 1994.

The Helen Storey label closed in 1995, following which Helen wrote and published her autobiography, Fighting Fashion, charting her personal experience within the industry. Published by Faber & Faber, it was described by Sir Paul Smith as... ‘At last the truth – a perfect and witty account of life and British Fashion’.

== Primitive Streak ==
Primitive Streak is a science-art collaboration created in 1997 alongside her sister, developmental biologist, Kate Storey. The project, a collection of twenty seven dresses, conveys eleven key embryonic moments which evolve in the first 1000 hours of human life in textile form and is named after the structure that forms in the blastula during these early stages.

Initially funded by the Wellcome Trust, Primitive Streak was first exhibited at London's Institute of Contemporary Arts in 1997 before touring in seven countries, winning two awards and being seen by five million people.

The Primitive Streak project was expanded in 2011 through a new commission marking the 75th anniversary of the Wellcome Trust. The White Lung Dress explores the development and function of the lungs and respiratory health.

The Closing Neural Tube Dress was commissioned for the 2015 redevelopment of the Wellcome Collection Reading Room.

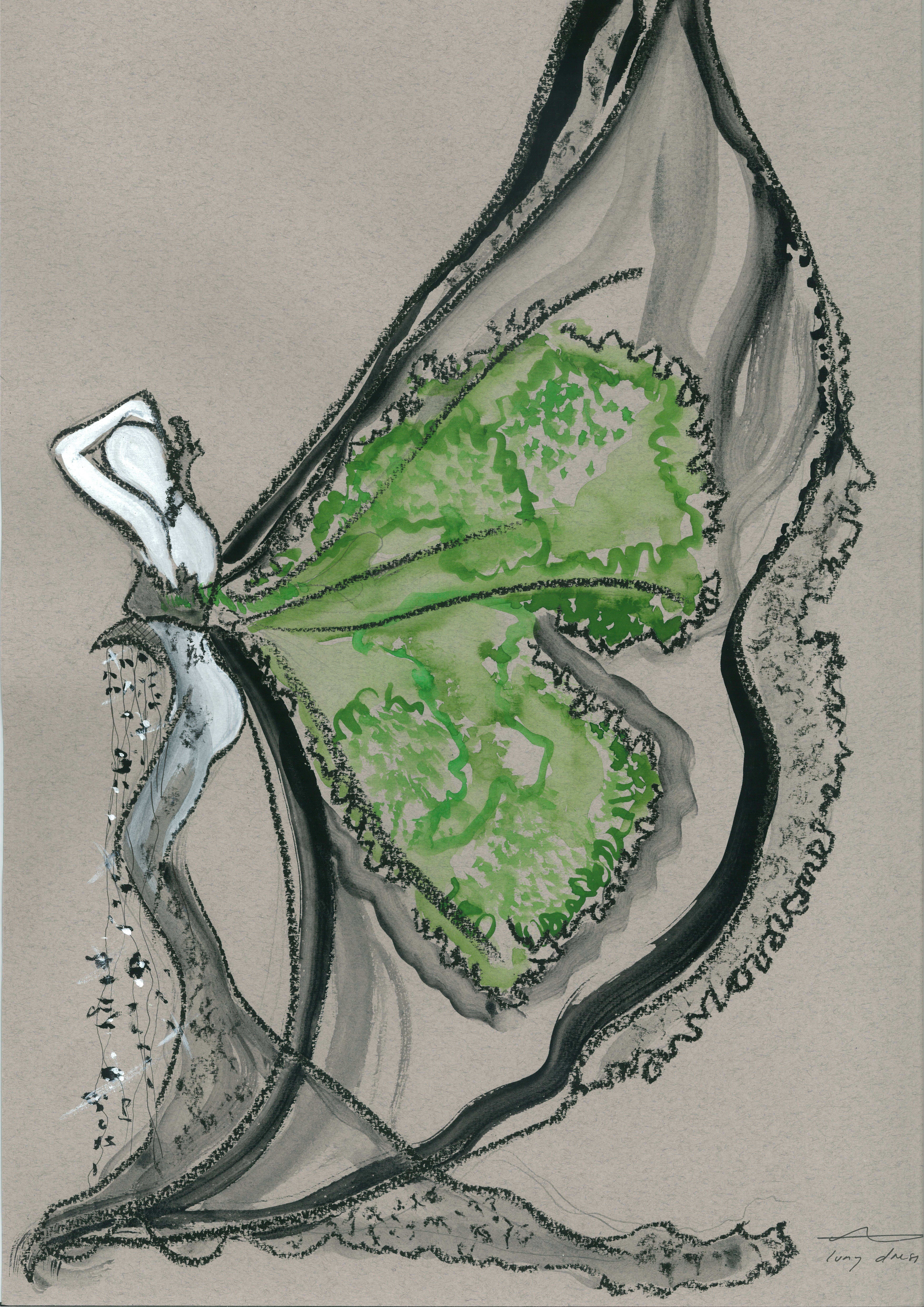
Lung Dress Sketch - Helen Storey, 2011

The Dark Lung Dress is a part of the National Museum of Scotland's permanent textile collection.

== Helen Storey Foundation ==
In response to the success of Primitive Streak, Helen Storey and Caroline Coates established The Helen Storey Foundation in 1997, a not-for-profit arts organisation promoting creativity and innovation.

The foundation has collaborated with numerous scientists, and has created eight international touring projects, notably Primitive Streak, Mental, Wonderland, Eye&I and Dress of Glass and Flame.

The Helen Storey Foundation was closed in 2019, but remains as an archive resource for students and researchers.

== Other career highlights 2004 to present ==
=== Eye&I 2005 to present ===
Eye&I is a performance-led art installation, that seeks to explore the relationship between facial expressions and emotions. The work was created in collaboration with Professor James Coan, professor of psychology, University of Virginia, and has visited schools in South London and events such as the Manchester Science Festival.

=== Wonderland 2008 to present ===
Wonderland was a collaborative project between Helen Storey, the London College of Fashion, scientist Professor Tony Ryan of the University of Sheffield, and Trish Belford of Ulster University, that examined plastic packaging and investigated new approaches to how it could be reused and disposed of. The Disappearing Dresses from the exhibition went on to appear at the Royal Academy of Arts, London and toured Europe as part of the Futurotextiles exhibition in 2010/2011.

A later exhibition, Plastic Is Precious: It's Buried Sunshine, explored similar themes with a focus on plastic shopping bags, and was held at Meadowhall shopping centre in Sheffield in 2013.

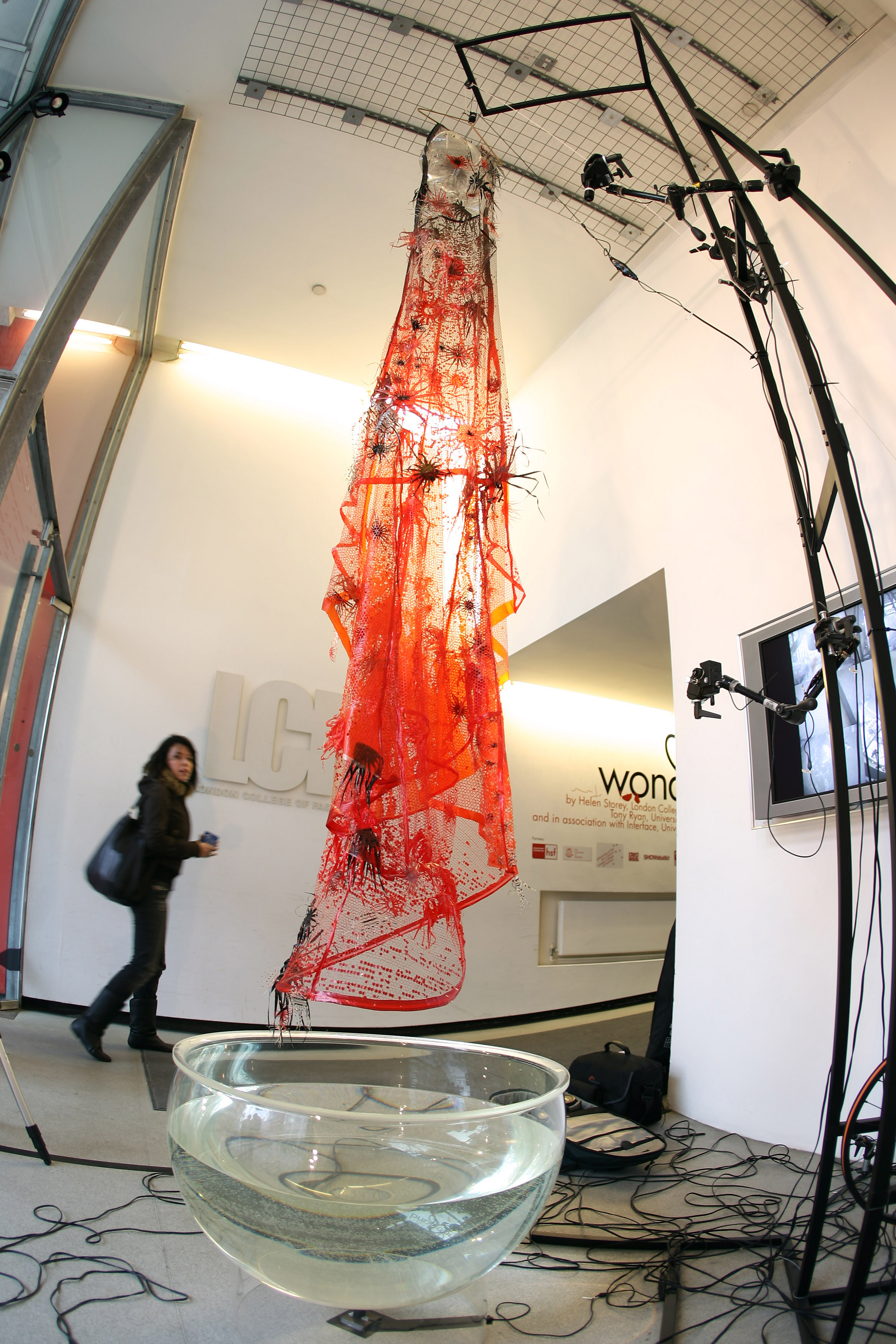
Dissolving Dress at London College of Fashion 2008

=== Catalytic Clothing 2008 to present ===
Catalytic Clothing is a project developed in collaboration with Professor Tony Ryan to demonstrate how a photocatalyst that breaks down airborne pollutants could be applied to textiles and clothing through the laundry process to improve air quality. The first Catalytic Clothing exhibition, Herself, featured a couture textile sculpture and was first shown in Sheffield in October 2010 before appearing as part of Newcastle ScienceFest in 2011. It was shown in Dubai in 2012 and toured France in 2013.

A second exhibition, Field of Jeans, applied the photocatalyst to pairs of denim jeans, to illustrate how it could be used in everyday life. The exhibition appeared in Sheffield, Newcastle and London, and was developed into A Field of Jeans and Kilts for the Edinburgh International Science Festival before appearing at Manchester Science Festival in 2012.

Catalytic Clothing was announced joint winner of the Sustainability category at the Condé Nast Traveller Innovation & Design Awards 2012.

=== Dress of Glass and Flame ===
A joint collaboration between the Royal Society of Chemistry, the Helen Storey Foundation, University of Sheffield, Berengo Studio and the London College of Fashion, the Dress of Glass and Flame piece was designed to highlight and perpetuate the chemistry behind its creation and production.

First exhibited at the Venice Biennale 2013, the Dress of Glass and Flame has subsequently gone on display at the Manchester Gallery as part of Manchester Science Festival 2014, Sheffield Festival of the Mind, and at Summerhall in Edinburgh as part of The Edinburgh International Science Festival 2014.

=== Life On The Outskirts 2014 to present ===
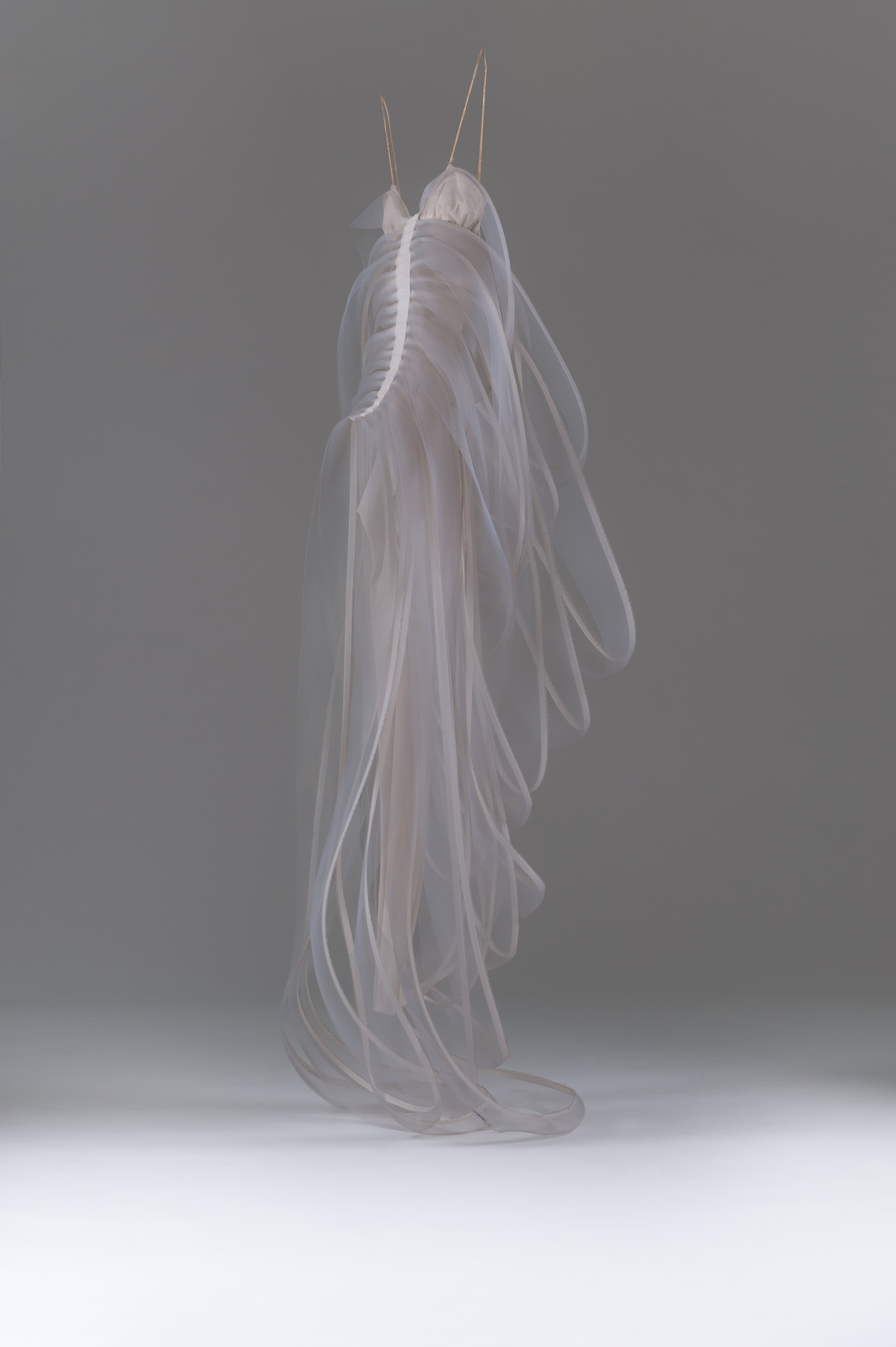
Crin Dress from Rage Collection, Spring / Summer 1991. Life on the Outskirts. Helen Storey Foundation/Kingston University. Photography: Ezzidin Alwan

Life on the Outskirts is a AHRC funded project developed with Dr Robert Knifton, Kingston University and Dr Alison Slater, Manchester Metropolitan University that considers mobilising the Helen Storey Foundation archive to create a digital resource that presents key findings as well as interactions and responses from students, members of the public and project participants.

=== Dress for Our Time 2015 to present ===
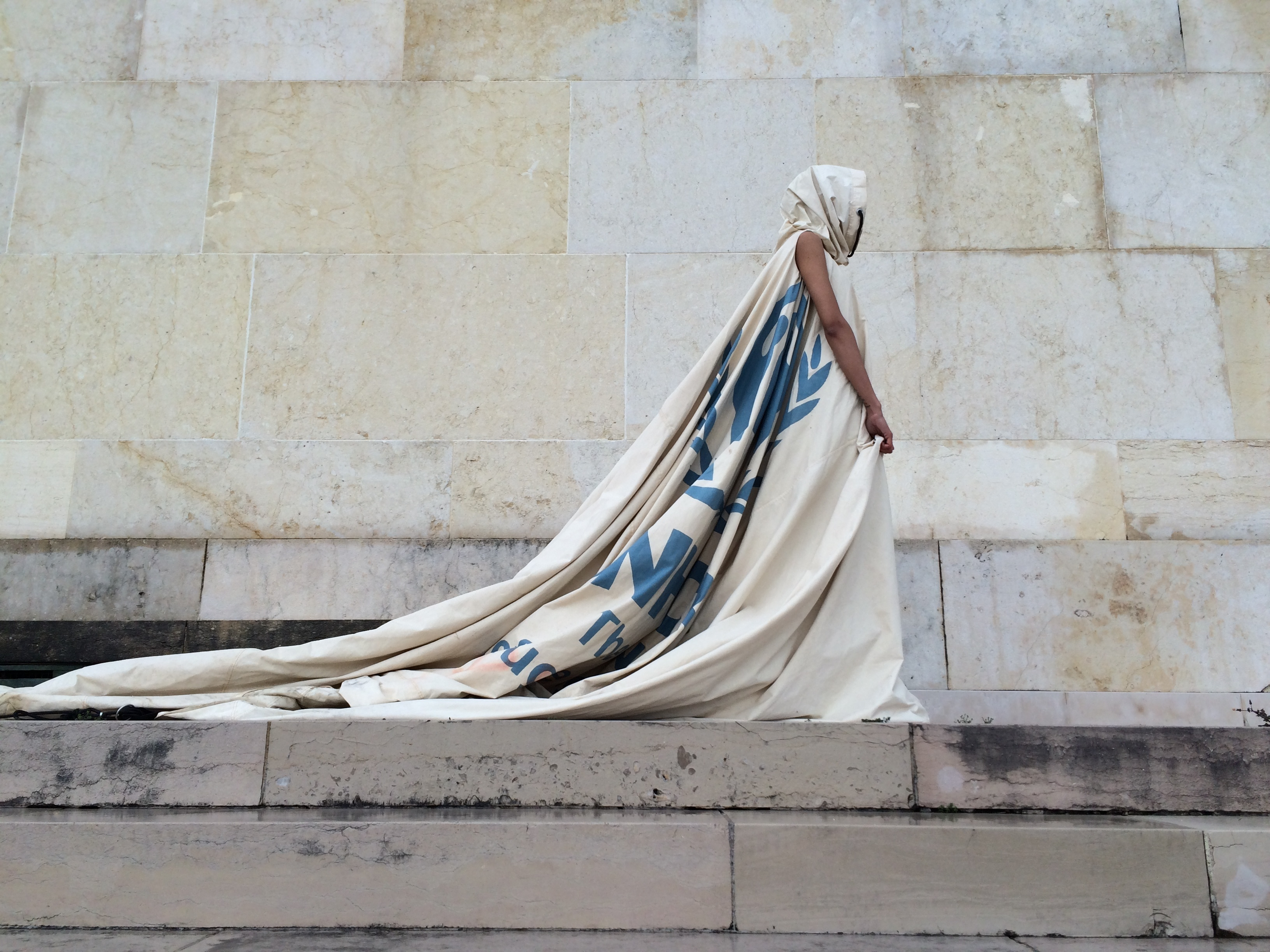
Dress For Our Time at UN Geneva, as part of the TEDxPlaceDesNations Transforming Lives event in February 2016

Dress for Our Time was launched at St Pancras International, London in November 2015, and is an examination of the impact of climate change on human beings. The dress is made from an 'end of life' UNHCR tent from Jordan and was shown, together with the Dress For Our Time film at the UNHCR Geneva hosted conference Transforming Lives on 11 February 2016.

=== UNHCR Artist/Designer in Residence Zaatari Refugee Camp, Jordan 2019 – 2020 ===
In 2019 Helen was given a new role within the Zaatari refugee camp of the first UNHCR Artist in Residence.

In August 2020, led by the University of Sheffield, Helen Storey and researchers working with the UNHCR were awarded a grant to respond to the COVID-19 crisis in Jordan. People’s PPE: Dealing with a Crisis by Building Livelihoods in Za’atari Refugee Camp was funded by UK Research and Innovation through the UK Government's Global Challenges Research Fund (GCRF) and the Newton Fund.

== Academic life ==
Helen is part of the team at The Centre for Sustainable Fashion at London College of Fashion, where she contributes to research, curriculum and enterprise activities.

== Awards and honours ==
Visiting Professor, University of the Arts 1998
Fellow, Royal Society of the Arts 1999
Research Fellow, University of the Arts, February 2000
Honorary Professorship, Heriot Watt University, 2001
Honorary Professorship King's College London 2003
Visiting Professor of Material Chemistry, Sheffield University 2008
MBE for Services to The Arts – June 2009
Honorary Doctor of Science University of Sheffield 2012
Honorary Professor of Craft and Design (DJCA) University of Dundee 2012
Winner of the Condé Nast Traveler Award, for Best Design & Innovation for the Catalytic Clothing Project (Sustainability category) 2012
Royal Designer for Industry, Royal Society of the Arts 2014
Honorary Fellowship Arts University Bournemouth 2014

== Publications ==
Storey, Helen (1996). Fighting Fashion. Faber & Faber.
Contributor to the Designer Fact File, a guide to setting up a fashion business commissioned by the Department of Trade and Industry and the British Fashion Council

== External sources ==
- Helen Storey Foundation website
- Helen Storey Foundation Tumblr
- University of the Arts Research Staff
- Centre For Sustainable Fashion: Dress For Our Time
