= Sigma Protocol =

The Sigma Protocol is the name of a novel.

Sigma Protocol may also refer to:

- Sigma protocols, a type of cryptographic protocol.
