= This Sporting Life =

1963 British film directed by Lindsay Anderson

- Film poster by Renato Fratini
- Directed by: Lindsay Anderson
- Screenplay by: David Storey
- Based on: This Sporting Life by David Storey
- Produced by: Karel Reisz
- Starring: Richard Harris; Rachel Roberts; Alan Badel; William Hartnell
- Cinematography: Denys Coop
- Edited by: Peter Taylor
- Music by: Roberto Gerhard
- Production company: Independent Artists
- Distributed by: Rank Organisation
- Release dates: 7 February 1963 (London); 22 February 1963 (UK)
- Running time: 134 minutes
- Country: United Kingdom
- Language: English
- Budget: £230,000 or £197,381

This Sporting Life is a 1963 British kitchen sink drama film directed by Lindsay Anderson, and adapted by David Storey from his 1960 novel. It stars Richard Harris, Rachel Roberts, William Hartnell, and Alan Badel. Harris, in his first starring role, portrays a rugby league footballer in Wakefield, a mining city in Yorkshire, whose romantic life is not as successful as his sporting life.

The film opened at the Odeon Leicester Square in London's West End on 7 February 1963. Though a commercial failure, it was a critical success. At the 1963 Cannes Film Festival, the film was nominated for the Palme d'Or and Harris won the Best Actor Award. At the 36th Academy Awards, the film received nominations for Best Actor (for Harris) and Best Actress (for Roberts). Roberts won her second BAFTA Award for Best Actress, and the film was nominated in four other categories, including, Best Film, Best Screenplay, and Best Actor (Harris).

In 1999, the British Film Institute ranked the film at No. 52 of the Top 100 British films.

== Plot ==
Frank Machin is a bitter young coal miner from the West Riding of Yorkshire. The first part of the story is told through a series of flashbacks when Frank is anaesthetised in a dentist's chair, having had his front teeth broken in a rugby league match, and recovering at a Christmas party. The second part takes place after he has fully regained his senses, and proceeds without flashbacks.

Following a nightclub altercation, in which Frank takes on the captain of the local rugby league club and punches a couple of other players, he asks a scout for the team, whom he nicknames "Dad", to help him get a tryout. Although at first somewhat uncoordinated at the sport, he impresses Gerald Weaver, one of the team's owners, with the spirit and brutality of his playing style during the trial game. He receives a large signing bonus to join the top team as a loose forward (number 13) and impresses all with his aggressive forward play. He often punches or elbows the opposing players—and sometimes even those of his own team.

Off the field, Frank is much less successful. His recently widowed landlady, Mrs Margaret Hammond, a mother of two young children, rebuffs Frank's attempts to court her and treats him rudely and abrasively. She lost her husband in an accident at Weaver's engraving firm, but received little financial compensation, because the death was suspected to be a suicide. One day, Frank takes Margaret and her children to play in the River Wharfe next to Bolton Priory. Another time, Margaret gets annoyed when Frank comes home drunk. He desires her sexually and, eventually, grabs her and forces her onto his bed. Her daughter interrupts them, but then she acquiesces and they have recurring sexual relations.

At Weaver's Christmas party, Frank quarrels with Weaver and his predatory wife, whose advances Frank had rejected previously, much to her chagrin, and it is clear that he has lost Weaver's favour—though Slomer, the team's other owner, now supports him more fastidiously. When he gets home after the party, Margaret agrees to share his bed to keep him warm, as he looks unwell with his swollen face and missing teeth. But, in her grief, she cannot really return his affection, saying she is scared to invest her feelings in one person, as they might abandon her or die. She sometimes insults him, referring to him as "just a great ape", and, on their first proper date, Frank insults the staff and flaunts protocol at the fancy restaurant to which he takes her. Margaret is embarrassed and leaves, and the scene is witnessed by the Weavers, who icily shun him.

Maurice, Frank's friend and teammate, gets married, and Frank and Margaret attend the ceremony. When Frank goes over to congratulate the couple, Margaret walks away. She says she feels ashamed, like a kept woman, especially since Frank bought her a fur coat. He strikes her, and then says he thought she was finally becoming happy. On another occasion, she says that their neighbours think she is a slut and she and the children are not "proper people" because of Frank. They have a row, and Frank goes out drinking with Maurice. He says he wants another job, "something permanent", and believes Margaret needs him, though she does not realise it.

Frank tries to talk to Margaret, but she defends her privacy, saying he knows nothing about Eric, her deceased husband. He says she drove Eric to suicide, and Margaret, outraged, demands that Frank leave as she starts throwing his belongings out of his room. Frank says he loves her, but she is furious with him. Eventually, he goes to stay at Dad's cheap boarding house in a bombed-out area, leaving his Jaguar incongruously parked outside.

Intending a reconciliation with Margaret, Frank returns to her house where he is met by their neighbour who says she is in hospital. The doctor tells him that Margaret is unconscious, having suffered a brain haemorrhage, and that she may not have the strength, or perhaps the will, to survive. Frank sits with her, holding her hand and talking gently. Distracted by a large spider on the wall, when he looks back at Margaret, blood seeps from her mouth, and she dies. In his rage, Frank slams his fist into the spider, killing it. He does not speak to the children or their minder when he leaves the hospital. Returning to Margaret's house and breaking in by the back door, Frank wanders through the empty space and calls out her name before collapsing in tears.

In the closing scene, Frank is seen on the rugby field, now exhausted and vulnerable to the ravages of time and injury.

== Cast ==
- Richard Harris as Frank Machin
- Rachel Roberts as Margaret Hammond
- Alan Badel as Gerald Weaver, an owner of the rugby league team
- William Hartnell as "Dad" Johnson, a scout for the rugby league team
- Colin Blakely as Maurice Braithwaite, a rugby league player
- Vanda Godsell as Anne Weaver, Gerald's wife
- Anne Cunningham as Judith, Maurice's girlfriend
- Jack Watson as Len Miller, captain of the rugby league team
- Arthur Lowe as Charles Slomer, an owner of the rugby league team
- Harry Markham as Wade, the coach of the rugby league team
- George Sewell as Jeff, a rugby league player
- Leonard Rossiter as Phillips, a sports writer
- Katherine Parr as Mrs. Farrer, Margaret's neighbour
- Bernadette Benson as Lynda Hammond, Margaret's daughter
- Andrew Nolan as Ian Hammond, Margaret's son
- Peter Duguid as Margaret's doctor
- Wallas Eaton as a waiter at the restaurant
- Anthony Woodruff as Thomas, the head waiter
- Tom Clegg as Gower, a rugby league player
- Ken Traill as Ken, a trainer for the rugby league team
- Frank Windsor as the dentist
- Edward Fox as Bruce, the barman at the restaurant (uncredited)

== Production ==
=== Background ===
This Sporting Life was Anderson's first feature film as director, though he had made numerous short documentaries in the previous fifteen years, and even won an Oscar for 1954's Thursday's Children. The film had first been discussed by The Rank Organisation as a possible project for Joseph Losey, and then Karel Reisz, who, reluctant to direct another film with a similar setting and theme to Saturday Night and Sunday Morning (1960), suggested that Anderson direct it, with himself serving as producer.

David Storey, himself a former professional rugby league footballer, also wrote the screenplay.

=== Casting ===
Among the film's supporting cast is William Hartnell, who shortly afterwards began his role as the Doctor in Doctor Who; it was his role in This Sporting Life that brought Hartnell to the attention of producer Verity Lambert. Several retrospective scholars have considered Hartnell's character a subtle example of a closeted homosexual. The film also features Arthur Lowe, who would go on to star in Dad's Army and appear in four later films directed by Anderson. In addition, Edward Fox, Glenda Jackson, Anton Rodgers, and Bryan Mosley appear as uncredited extras.

=== Direction ===
Anderson wrote in his diary on 23 April 1962, after the first month or so of production: "the most striking feature of it all, I suppose, has been the splendour and misery of my work and relationship with Richard". He felt that Harris was acting better than ever before in his career, but feared his feelings for Harris, whose combination of physicality, affection and cruelty fascinated him, meant that he lacked the detachment he needed as a director, continuing: "I ought to be calm and detached with him. Instead I am impulsive, affectionate, infinitely susceptible."

=== Filming locations ===
Many of the scenes in This Sporting Life were filmed at Belle Vue, the home stadium of Wakefield Trinity, and Thrum Hall, the home stadium of Halifax. The scene where Frank (Richard Harris) leaps from a bus to buy a newspaper, and then leaps back onto the bus, was filmed at the top of Westgate, Wakefield. The location is still instantly recognisable, and has changed little in the decades since. The houses used for filming the outdoor scenes in This Sporting Life were in Servia Terrace in Leeds. The riverside location where Frank takes Margaret and her family for an outing in his new car is Bolton Priory in the Yorkshire Dales.

=== Editing ===
Anthony Sloman wrote about the film's editing:

By 1963 the British New Wave had beached, and Peter Taylor edited the superb This Sporting Life, the début feature of the cine-literate director Lindsay Anderson. It is a remarkable study of working class angst, with a cutting style like no other British feature before it, an ever-underrated achievement by Taylor.

Another description of the editing says:

From the start, Lindsay Anderson and his editor Peter Taylor show a determination to pursue a flashback-based narrative using bold-cut transitions. ... Cut-transitions link these plangent and understated images together in way that seems to demand that their meanings be understood. It is an important restatement of the way that image-driven filmmaking engages the spectator.

== Release ==
The film opened at the Odeon Leicester Square in London's West End on 7 February 1963. It was released in the UK by The Rank Organisation on 22 February.

=== Home media ===
On 22 January 2008, the film was released as a Region 1 DVD by The Criterion Collection.

== Reception ==
=== Box office ===
On its initial release, the film was a commercial flop with British audiences and did not recoup its cost. John Davis, the Chairman of The Rank Organisation, announced that the company would not venture further with "kitchen sink" film projects, nor would his company make such a "squalid" film again, and This Sporting Life has been seen more generally as ending producers' willingness to back such British New Wave films. Filmink hypothesised "the sexual content which helped earlier dramas become hits (Room at the Top, Saturday Night and Sunday Morning) could now be found in the more escapist worlds of James Bond and Tom Jones" and the movie "was over two hours long and is really depressing, even for a kitchen sink drama."

However, after 13 years, the film had earned a distributor's gross of £92,612 in the UK and £128,599 from overseas for a cost of £197,381.

=== Critical response ===
Critical response to the film was favourable. In the United States, the Reuters news agency described it as being praised unanimously by the critics for New York City publications. Variety praised the film's "gutsy vitality", as well as the production of Reisz and the directorial efforts of Anderson, who "brings the keen, observant eye of a documentary man to many vivid episodes without sacrificing the story line".

Filmink wrote the film "launched Richard Harris as a star, and no wonder: he gets to glower and swagger, thump around on the rugby league field, kiss/roger/slap women, suffer unrequited love, have people lust after him, rail at the unfairness of life, be nice to kids, have tormented relationships with everyone."

Writing in 1980, John Russell Taylor thought it a mistake to link This Sporting Life with the "kitchen sink" films released in the preceding few years, because its "emotionalism" made it "unique", setting it apart from the earlier works:

...every scene in the film is charged with the passion of what is not said and done, as well as what is...Though real enough and believable enough, this kind of amour fou is remote indeed from what the staid middle class cinema would generally consider as realism."

=== Awards and nominations ===
Institution	Category	Nominee(s)	Result	Ref.
Academy Awards	Best Actor	Richard Harris	Nominated	
Academy Awards	Best Actress	Rachel Roberts	Nominated	
British Academy Film Awards	Best Film from any Source		Nominated	
British Academy Film Awards	Best British Film		Nominated	
British Academy Film Awards	Best British Actor	Richard Harris	Nominated	
British Academy Film Awards	Best British Actress	Rachel Roberts	Won	
British Academy Film Awards	Best British Screenplay	David Storey	Nominated	
Cannes Film Festival	Palme d'Or	Lindsay Anderson	Nominated	
Cannes Film Festival	Best Actor	Richard Harris	Won	
Golden Globe Awards	Best Foreign Film – English-Language		Nominated	
Golden Globe Awards	Best Actress in a Motion Picture – Drama	Rachel Roberts	Nominated	
National Board of Review Awards	Top Ten Films		5th Place	
New York Film Critics Circle Awards	Best Actor	Richard Harris	3rd Place	
Valladolid International Film Festival	Golden Spike	Lindsay Anderson	Won	

== See also ==
- BFI Top 100 British films
