= Saville (novel) =

1976 novel by David Storey

- First edition
- Author: David Storey
- Language: English
- Publisher: Jonathan Cape
- Publication date: 1976
- Publication place: United Kingdom
- Media type: Print (hardback & paperback)
- Pages: 506
- ISBN: 0-224-01273-8

Saville is a Booker Prize-winning novel by English writer David Storey.

== Plot ==
The novel centres on Colin, a young boy growing up in the Yorkshire mining village of Saxton during the Second World War and the postwar years.

== Awards ==
Saville won the 1976 Booker Prize for fiction.
