= Flight into Camden =

1961 novel by David Storey

First edition (publ. Longman)

Flight into Camden is a 1960 novel by British author and playwright David Storey. It won the 1963 Somerset Maugham Prize for fiction.
