= This Sporting Life (novel) =

Novel by David Storey

- Cover first edition, Longmans, London, 1960
- Author: David Storey
- Language: English
- Publication date: 1960

This Sporting Life is a 1960 novel by the English writer David Storey. It is set in Northern England and follows a man who tries to make it as a professional rugby league footballer. It was the debut novel of Storey, himself a former player for Leeds.

The book was the basis for Lindsay Anderson's 1963 film This Sporting Life.

== Reception ==
Kirkus Reviews wrote that "the strength of Mr. Storey's novel is in its toneless air of truth which spares nothing or no one, a fact which may well rebuff his readers."

Commemorating the book's fiftieth anniversary in 2010, Frank Keating of The Guardian wrote that "This Sporting Life has stood the test of 'classic' category ... The novel's uneasy love story of insecure anti-hero tough, Machin, and his world-weary landlady, Mrs Hammond, earthily provides harrowing off-field narrative, but it is in the raw sporting passages where the reader can wince at the resonance of uncomfortable truths[.]"
