= The Abbey (novel) =

2002 novel by Dan Doboș

- Author: Dan Doboș
- Original title: Abaţia
- Language: Romanian
- Series: The Abbey Trilogy
- Genre: Science fiction
- Publisher: Nemira
- Publication date: 2002
- Publication place: Romania
- Media type: Print (Hardback & Paperback)
- ISBN: 978-0-9824329-8-3
- Followed by: Blestemul Abației (The Curse of Abbey)

The Abbey (Romanian: Abația) is a science fiction novel by the Romanian author Dan Doboș. It was first published in 2002 by Editura Nemira.

== Plot summary ==
St. Augustine defined 6 periods from human life. The last period being the Armageddon - when the armies of humans led by a Messiah will have to defeat the forces of evil.
