= The Cleansing (novel) =

2002 novel by John D. Harvey

- Dust-jacket illustration by Tony Patrick for The Cleansing
- Author: John D. Harvey
- Cover artist: Tony Patrick
- Language: English
- Genre: Horror
- Publisher: Arkham House
- Publication date: 2002
- Publication place: United States
- Media type: Print (hardback)
- Pages: 319 pp
- ISBN: 0-87054-181-1
- OCLC: 50758121
- Dewey Decimal: 813/.5 22
- LC Class: PS3608.A789 C58 2002

The Cleansing is a horror novel by author John D. Harvey. It was released in 2002 by Arkham House in an edition of approximately 2,500 copies.

== Plot summary ==
The book tells the story of an American Indian wolf god, Wanata, who comes to earth to hold humanity accountable for its abuse of nature. In Alaska, freelance journalist Savannah Channing investigates the story of a rampaging wolf pack that is systematically destroying villages. She arrives to find that the problem is worse than she expected and that the military and a brutal bounty hunter have been employed. Wanata is changed into mortal human form by an Indian Shaman's magic and is forced to interact with those he was sent to punish. The paths of Wanata and Channing cross in a spine-chilling conclusion.

== Bibliography ==
- Nielsen, Leon (2004). Arkham House Books: A Collector's Guide. Jefferson, NC and London: McFarland & Company, Inc. p. 147. ISBN 0-7864-1785-4.
