= Pasmore (novel) =

1972 novel by David Storey

- First edition
- Author: David Storey
- Language: English
- Publisher: Longman
- Publication date: 1972
- Publication place: United Kingdom
- Pages: 201
- ISBN: 9780582105294

Pasmore is a 1972 novel by the English writer David Storey. It tells the story of a young university lecturer who has a nervous breakdown and leaves his wife and children. A central theme is social mobility and the view of the family across different classes. The novel also explores how mental illness can exist even in people who have seemingly ideal lives.

The book was awarded the Geoffrey Faber Memorial Prize in 1973. It was shortlisted for the 1972 Booker Prize.
