= David Storey =

English writer and professional rugby league player (1933 –2017)

- Born: David Malcolm Storey; 13 July 1933; Wakefield, West Riding of Yorkshire, England
- Died: 27 March 2017 (aged 83); London, England
- Education: Queen Elizabeth Grammar School, Wakefield
- Alma mater: Slade School of Fine Art
- Occupation: Novelist
- Spouse: Barbara Rudd Hamilton (m. 1956; died 2015)
- Writing career
- Genres: Novelist, playwright, screenwriter
- Notable awards: Booker Prize (1976)

David Malcolm Storey (13 July 1933 – 27 March 2017) was an English playwright, screenwriter, award-winning novelist and a professional rugby league player. He won the Booker Prize in 1976 for his novel Saville. He also won the MacMillan Fiction Award for This Sporting Life in 1960.

== Early life and career ==
Storey was born on 13 July 1933 in Wakefield, West Riding of Yorkshire, the son of a coal miner, Frank Richmond Story, and Lily (née Cartwright) Story. He was educated at QEGS Wakefield. He continued his education at London's Slade School of Fine Art, and supported himself there by playing rugby league for Leeds RLFC as a halfback for the "A" team, with occasional appearances in the first.

His plays include The Restoration of Arnold Middleton, The Changing Room, Cromwell, Home, and Stages. His novels include Flight into Camden, which won the 1961 John Llewellyn Rhys Prize and the 1963 Somerset Maugham Award; and Saville, which won the 1976 Booker Prize.

He wrote the screenplay for This Sporting Life (1963), directed by Lindsay Anderson, adapted from his first novel of the same name, originally published in 1960, which won the 1960 Macmillan Fiction Award. The film was the beginning of a long professional association with Anderson, whose film version of Storey's play In Celebration was released as part of the American Film Theatre series in 1975. Home and Early Days (both starred Sir Ralph Richardson; Home also starred Sir John Gielgud) were made into television films.

Storey's novel Pasmore was shortlisted for the Booker Prize.

National Life Stories conducted an oral history interview (C464/67) with David Storey in 2008-2009 for its National Life Stories General collection held by the British Library.

== Personal life ==
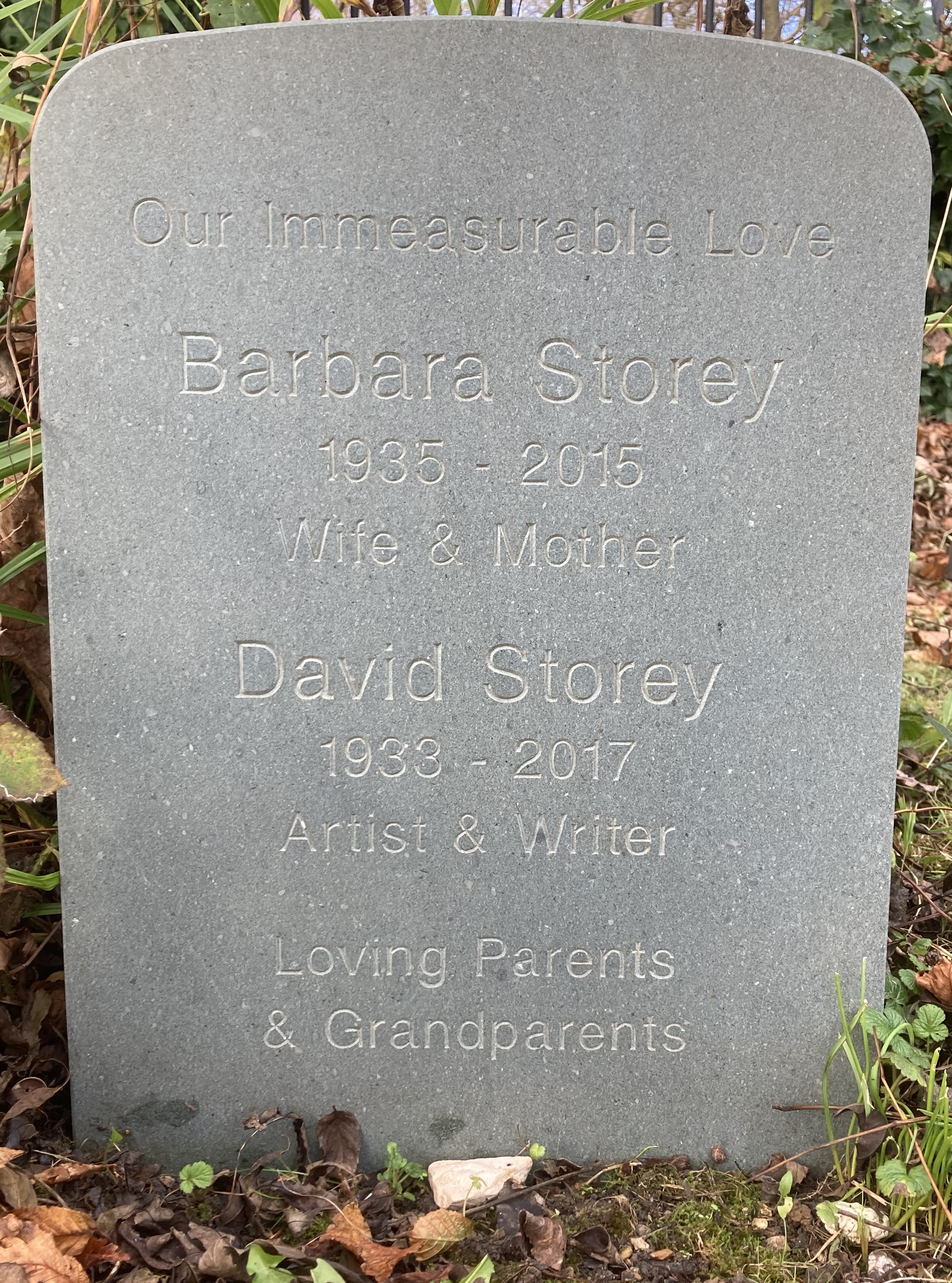
Grave of David Storey in Highgate Cemetery

In 1956, Storey married Barbara Rudd Hamilton, with whom he had four children. Barbara Storey died in 2015.

Storey died on 27 March 2017 in London at the age of 83 and was buried on the eastern side of Highgate Cemetery. The cause was Parkinson's disease and dementia. Survivors included his two sons, Jake and Sean; two daughters, Helen and Kate; a brother, Anthony; and six grandchildren.

== Works ==
=== Novels ===
- This Sporting Life (1960) (made into the 1963 film This Sporting Life)
- Flight into Camden (1961) – winner of the 1963 Somerset Maugham Award
- Radcliffe (1963)
- Pasmore (1972) – winner of the 1973 Geoffrey Faber Memorial Prize
- A Temporary Life (1973) (ISBN 978-0140048612)
- Edward (1973) (ISBN 978-0713906806)
- Saville (1976) – winner of the 1976 Booker Prize
- A Prodigal Child (1982)
- Present Times (1984)
- The Phoenix (1993) (novella)
- A Serious Man (1998)
- As It Happened (2002)
- A Star in the West (1999)
- Thin-Ice Skater (2004)

=== Plays ===
- The Restoration of Arnold Middleton (1967)
- In Celebration (1969)
- The Contractor (1970)
- Home (1970)
- The Changing Room (1973)
- The Farm (1973)
- Cromwell (1973) (ISBN 978-0224008716)
- Life Class (1974)
- Mother's Day (1977)
- Early Days (1980)
- Sisters (1980)
- The March on Russia (1989)
- Stages (1992)

=== Poetry ===
- Storey's Lives: 1951–1991 (1992) (ISBN 978-0224033084)

=== Autobiography ===
- A Stinging Delight (Faber and Faber, 2021)

== Sources ==
- Harrison, Juliet Francis Artistic Fictions: The Representation of the Artist Figure in Works by David Storey, John Fowles and Tom Stoppard (Ph.D., Exeter).
- Hutchings, William, ed. David Storey: A Casebook. NY: Garland, 1992.
- Hutchings, William. The Plays of David Storey: A Thematic Study. Carbondale: Southern Illinois UP, 1988.
- Liebman, Herbert The Dramatic Art of David Storey: The Journey of a Playwright, Greenwood Press.
- Schafer, Stephen C. "An Overview of the Working Classes in British Feature Film from the 1960s to the 1980s: From Class Consciousness to Marginalization", International Labor and Working-Class History 59: 3–14.
- Encyclopedia of British Film
- Contemporary Authors
