= University of Psychogenic Fugue =

2002 satirical book

The University of Psychogenic Fugue, sometimes abbreviated to UPF, is a satirical humor book in the form of a parody college course catalog for a fictional American University written by Tye R. Farrell and Jeffrey Morrow. It was published by Meteorite Press in 2002. Its subtitle is A Course Catalog for Students of Life.

The book satirizes the 21st-century college experience and the foibles of modern life through hundreds of "classes" in 15 "departments" of study, including Glamour, Suburban Science, Life Science, and Love. In addition, the book describes fictional scholarships, grants, university buildings, and meaninglessly complex policies. There are numerous campus clubs, fraternities and sororities, including Gamma Lambda Ding Dong and Eradicate Ugliness Worldwide. The book's sometimes cynical humor has been compared to The Onion.

The university's name comes from a psychological condition called psychogenic fugue, in which a person is unable to remember his or her past. The term psychogenic fugue was re-categorized as dissociative fugue so now, according to the authors, it is a state of mind that doesn't exist. This attitude reflects many of the mock course offerings unlikely to be encountered in traditional higher education, including:

- Glamour 106: Build a Better Supermodel
- Business 112: Advanced Drug Dealing
- Life Science 599: Postmodern Coffee
- Love 214: Valentine's Day Sabotage
- Suburban Science 244: How to be a Carnie
- Culinary Arts 105: Living Without Food
- Generally Accepted Science 131: Cadaver Farming
- Ethics 102: Living a Lie II
- Communications 121: Calling in Sick

The book received several humor and culture awards. Its format has drawn attention from diverse sources, from the Chronicle of Higher Education to the counterculture magazine High Times, as well as college and internet press.

UPF also hosts an online satirical counterpart where readers can learn more about the university and its programs of study.
