= Manchester Science Festival =

Manchester Science Festival is an annual science festival held in October in Manchester, England, and produced by the Museum of Science and Industry. It runs for eleven days, incorporating over 100 events across Greater Manchester for families and adults. Siemens has been the Festival’s headline sponsor since 2014, as part of its Curiosity Project.

== Introduction ==
The festival launched at the Museum of Science and Industry in 2007. With over 100,000 visits to the festival in 2015, Manchester Science Festival is England's largest science festival. The Manchester Evening News describe the festival as “one of the most fun things to happen to the region in recent years, taking practical science into places you never imagined possible all over the city”.

== Programme ==
Each year, the programme features hands-on activities, immersive experiences, exhibitions, talks and tours. Events reflect the festival ethos of ‘part laboratory, part playground’, and aim to bring science to audiences at the Museum and at venues across Greater Manchester.

The programme for Manchester Science Festival is created and produced collaboratively with partners across the North West. Over the years, this has included University of Manchester, Manchester Metropolitan University, University of Salford, Chester Zoo, Cancer Research UK, HackManchester, Jodrell Bank Discovery Centre, Manchester Cathedral, John Rylands Library and Manchester Central Library.

The programme encourages audiences to actively participate in science. This includes science busking activities and since 2014 has included the Museum of Science and Industry’s Platform for Investigation (Pi). The Pi is sponsored by Siemens and is part of the museum’s monthly live event programme. Pi gives audiences the opportunity to meet scientists and hear about their research whilst getting involved with experiments and activities.

Exhibitions are a feature of the festival programme, including contemporary science exhibitions at the Museum of Science and Industry. Since 2014, Cape Farewell, UK have partnered with the festival to commission an exhibition inspired by James Lovelock’s Gaia Theory. Notable exhibitions include Marcus Coates’ The Sounds of Others and Tania Kovats’ Evaporation.

=== Manchester Science Festival 2015 ===
The ninth annual science festival highlights included an adult only ball pool, artist Tania Kovats premiering Evaporation, Brian Cox, Robin Ince and Jon Culshaw recording The Infinite Monkey Cage, exhibition Kinetic Flux by Paul Miller and Griet Beyart and a two-day drone expo with the University of Salford’s Andy Miah. Manchester Evening News wrote that “The Manchester Science Festival – supported by Siemens – gives people the chance to get up close and hands-on with all things loud, lively, explosive and experimental”. The ball pool won Manchester Evening News’ City Life Awards Special Events Category 2015.

Festival director: Marieke Navin

=== Manchester Science Festival 2014 ===
The eighth Manchester Science Festival showcased Marcus Coates’ exhibition The Sounds of Others, a 3D printing exhibition, a debate over the future of fracking with Bez from Happy Mondays, and the building of a Mega Menger. The website Creative Tourist wrote about Manchester Science Festival’s programme, saying that, “The delight in such a diversity of diversions is being able to wander according to one’s own fancy; being cartographer to your own map. The book of Manchester is open: choose your own adventure”.

Festival director: Marieke Navin

=== Manchester Science Festival 2013 ===
In its seventh year, Manchester Science Festival brought the exhibition Brains: the Mind as Matter and a supporting events programme, launched its second citizen science project, Hooked On Music and built a giant Rube Goldberg Machine. The Festival also won the Manchester Tourism Award for Large Tourism Event of the Year.

Festival director: Marieke Navin

== Citizen Science Projects ==
Manchester Science Festival has been involved with two citizen science projects since 2007. The first was Turing's Sunflowers in 2012 and #HookedOnMusic, part of the festival programme since 2013.

=== Turing's Sunflowers ===
The experiment was conceived by Jonathan Swinton and led by Erinma Ochu at the Museum of Science and Industry, who said that "we hope to provide the missing evidence to test Turing's little-known theories about Fibonacci numbers in sunflowers. It would be a fitting celebration of the work of Alan Turing".

Citizen scientists from seven countries participated, growing over 500 sunflowers, over 450 of which conformed to the Fibonacci sequence, thereby proving Alan Turing's theory.

=== HookedOnMusic ===
Launched at the 2013 Manchester Science Festival with Ashley Burgoyne from the University of Amsterdam, audiences were encouraged to play a free, online game that produced results for scientific research. Researchers were looking for the hooks in music to help future research on Alzheimer's disease. By using catchy music, researchers hope to find ways to trigger therapeutic benefits for patients.

Results presented at the 2014 Manchester Science Festival revealed the UK's top ten catchiest tunes, looking at just how memorable parts of songs can be. The number one catchiest song was the Spice Girls' 'Wannabe'.

== Sponsorship ==
Since 2014, Siemens has been the headline sponsor for the festival. Other major sponsors include the University of Salford, Electricity North West and the Waters Corporation.
