= The Dream Merchant (novel) =

2002 novel by Isabel Hoving

- First edition (Dutch)
- Author: Isabel Hoving
- Original title: De gevleugelde kat
- Translator: Hester Velmans
- Cover artist: Phil Schramm (eng. trans.)
- Language: Dutch and English
- Genre: Fantasy novel
- Publisher: Walker Books (eng. trans.)
- Publication date: 2002 (Querido)
- Publication place: The Netherlands
- Media type: Print (Hardback & Paperback)
- Pages: 640 pp
- ISBN: 0-7445-8335-7
- OCLC: 57430885

The Dream Merchant is a 2002 Dutch fantasy novel by Isabel Hoving.

== Plot summary ==
Twelve-year-old Joshua Cope is contacted by a corporation called Gippart International one day late at night. Joshua and his friend, Bhasvar (Baz) Patel go to Gippart and meet Max Herbert, a talent scout. Josh is sent into a dreamworld to sell products. But dreams also come with nightmares...

Umaya, the collective dream of everyone at that point in time, is caught between dreams and reality. Josh, Baz and a fellow associate Teresa cannot get out of the dream-world, where time is running backwards due to a Gippart employee attempting to break into real time rather than dream-time. Along his adventure, Josh meets his dead twin sister Jericho, who has been attempting to get in contact with him for 350 years. But with Jericho comes Lucide, a guardian who makes sure that no one crosses the borders of life and death.

The members of this troop find themselves with powers that they cannot explain. Baz, the first to find his powers, can control dream time by listening to the rhythm and matching it, causing it to slow, stop, or even rewind. Teresa changes Umaya with words, influencing people and surroundings to her will, she is the group storyteller. Josh is a thief and can change the very nature of things just by looking at them. However, they are trapped in umaya, the dream-world.

The four children must find Tembe at the end of time and fulfill Siparti's last promise to Temberi. They learn about each of Siparti's six kids and put together the clues that each of them hold.

After a harrowing ordeal, Josh, Jericho, Baz, Teresa, and Mervin Spratt manage to find their way to the edge of time itself, where the Tembe people live in a crumbling Fortress. The Tembe, descended from Temberi, have been trapped at the edge of time for over 1000 years. Luckily, the Tembe are friendly people, and show the associates how their Fortress is slowly being ripped away into the hurricane whom they have named Satura. Using the powers they gained in the journey, the children manage to find their way through the hurricane back into the real world.

Unfortunately, in the end, Jericho decides to return with Lucide and stay in Umaya.

== Characters ==
The following character descriptions appear at the back of the book:

=== Josh's Family (and Baz) ===
- Joshua (Josh) Michael Cope, 12 years old, son of Mo and Peter Cope
- Bhasvar (Baz) Patel, Josh's best friend, 12 years old
- Edwin - boyfriend of Josh's mother, Mo
- Liz - Edwin's daughter, 18 years old
- Mervin Spratt - Liz's Boyfriend, enemy of Josh and associate of Garnet
- Jericho Cope, 'dead' twin sister of Joshua, comeback child

=== Gippart International ===
- Marmeduke Fawcett - Secretary of Youth Affairs, Dispatch Board
- Max Herbert - Talent Scout, Dispatch Board
- Garnet Gippart, Tal Sow Fall, Miriane Comptesso and Oublassi - Board members, Disbatch Board, Project Umaya
- Ouahabi - Senior in employ of the Dispatch Board
- Moussa - Chief of Associates, 17 years old
- Teresa Okwoma - Gippart Associate, friend of Josh and Baz, 14 years old
- Ida Gippart - Vice President

=== Siparti ===
- Siparti - (or Kide) born 950, in Zaam
- Mono - the beloved, is the eldest son, born in 990; his city is Ixilis
- Brax - the noble one, is the eldest daughter, born in 993; the Takraas highlands are her territory
- Kauri - the missionary, is the middle daughter, born in 995; her territory is the coastline around Tsumir and its oceans
- Beez - the lethal one, is the middle son, born in 996; the city of Bat Zavinam has been his since the year 1347
- Kat - the youngest daughter, born in Arrar on January 1, 1000
- Gip - the youngest son, born in Arrar on January 1, 1000

=== Temberi ===
- Temberi - (or Awè) born in 948 in Zaam
- Bazamène - whose eldest son is Tibid
- Lim the Singer - whose eldest son is Mim
- Imen
- Mersele
- Pann

== Literary significance & criticism ==
"There is no doubt about it, this is better than Harry Potter. It is compelling, exciting, wonderfully complicated, realistic, credible, heartwarming and is loaded with fantasy and humour. A sensational debut by a born narrator." de Volkskrant

"Out of the blue there appears one of these worldbooks, in which young readers can lose themselves." De Gelderlander

"Generously long-drawn-out epic by a new master narrator... In cinematic scenes Hoving recalls magic and intriguing worlds like Tolkien has done it before... No Harry Potter can beat that!" De Morgen

"An epic fantasy, original and fresh" Michael Morpurgo

== Awards and nominations ==
- Golden Kiss 2003
