= Darren Williams (author) =

Australian novelist

Darren Williams (born 4 September 1967) is an Australian novelist.

Darren Williams is best known for his novel Swimming in Silk which won the prestigious Australian/Vogel Literary Award in 1994. The book has also received much critical acclaim and was reviewed by The Washington Post. Speaking about the award some time later, Williams claimed that winning it had increased the pressure on him to write a second book that would be as good, if not better, than the first. He is quoted as saying: "The Vogel begins careers. That's why it's important. It doesn't make it easier to write the second novel." His second novel, Angel Rock, was published in 2002.

== Bibliography ==
- Swimming in Silk, (1994) ISBN 978-1-86373-849-1
- Angel Rock, (2002) ISBN 0-00-712847-9
