= As It Happened (novel) =

2002 novel by David Storey

- First edition
- Author: David Storey
- Language: English
- Publisher: Jonathan Cape
- Publication date: 2002
- Publication place: United Kingdom
- Pages: 419
- ISBN: 9780224062749

As It Happened is a 2002 novel by the English writer David Storey. It tells the story of an art professor who attends group therapy sessions.

== Reception ==
The Observer's Adam Mars-Jones criticised the book's punctuation, loose grammar and unstructured sentences, writing that "no book as unreadable as As It Happened would be published without surgery if it came from an unknown writer - unless all the reading is now done by machines, like so much of the proofreading." D. J. Taylor of The Independent described the prose as "just on the right side of intelligibility", and wrote: "Fascinating in some of its incidentals, never free of the sensation of a sharp intelligence at work, As it happened offers in the end only the spectacle of a highly distinguished veteran author enjoying a conversation with that receptive but debilitating audience: himself."
