= How to Argue with an Economist =

Book by Lindy Edwards

- Author: Lindy Edwards
- Subject: Economics
- Published: Cambridge University Press (2002)
- Publication place: Australia
- Pages: 172
- ISBN: 9780521819039
- OCLC: 49799415

How to Argue with an Economist: Reopening Political Debate in Australia is a 2002 book by Lindy Edwards which is in its second edition as of May 2007. In this book, Edwards explores the role of economics in society, as well as the influence of "economic rationalism" on Australian politics. Edwards argues that this economic view overlooks important social issues and explains how, in her opinion, it has transformed Australian culture.

Lindy Edwards is a former economic adviser in the Australian Prime Minister's Department.
