= Angel Rock =

Book by Darren Williams

- First edition
- Author: Darren Williams
- Language: English
- Genre: crime fiction
- Publisher: HarperCollins
- Publication date: 20 May 2002
- Publication place: Australia
- Media type: Print (Hardcover)
- Pages: 320pp
- ISBN: 0-00-713715-X
- OCLC: 48931085

Angel Rock is a crime novel by Darren Williams, first published in 2002.

== Plot summary ==
The novel is set against the backdrop of a fictional Australian bush town, Angel Rock, during the late 1960s. The story concerns the investigation of two seemingly separate incidents: the disappearance of two young brothers (of who only one has returned home safely), and the suicide of a teenage girl in a derelict house in Sydney.

During the course of investigating the teenage girl's death, the detective chooses to go to the town and begins to believe that the two incidents might be linked in some way and he is forced to confront memories from his own past.

== Publication history ==
- Williams, Darren (2002). Angel Rock. HarperCollins. ISBN 0-00-713715-X.
