= John D. Harvey =

American novelist

- Born: June 3, 1968 (age 58); Boston, Massachusetts, United States
- Occupations: Fiction writer; marketer; copywriter
- Writing career
- Genres: Thriller fiction, Dark fantasy, Horror fiction
- Website: johndharvey.com

John D. Harvey (born June 3, 1968) is a horror novelist, screenwriter, and freelance writer. He holds a bachelor's degree in creative writing and in journalism. He lives in Rhode Island.

== Bibliography ==
His articles have appeared in periodicals including Providence Film Notes, Newport This Week, The Traveler Newspaper, The Boston Irish Reporter, and Irish Music Magazine.

=== Short stories and poems ===
- The Blood Review, April 1990 (poem – "Graceful")
- The Leading Edge #22, 1990 (short story – "Robots & Diapers")
- Mindmares, Summer 1998 (short story – "The Dull Lord Hornsby")

=== Novels ===
- The Cleansing (2002)
