= Viken Berberian =

American novelist

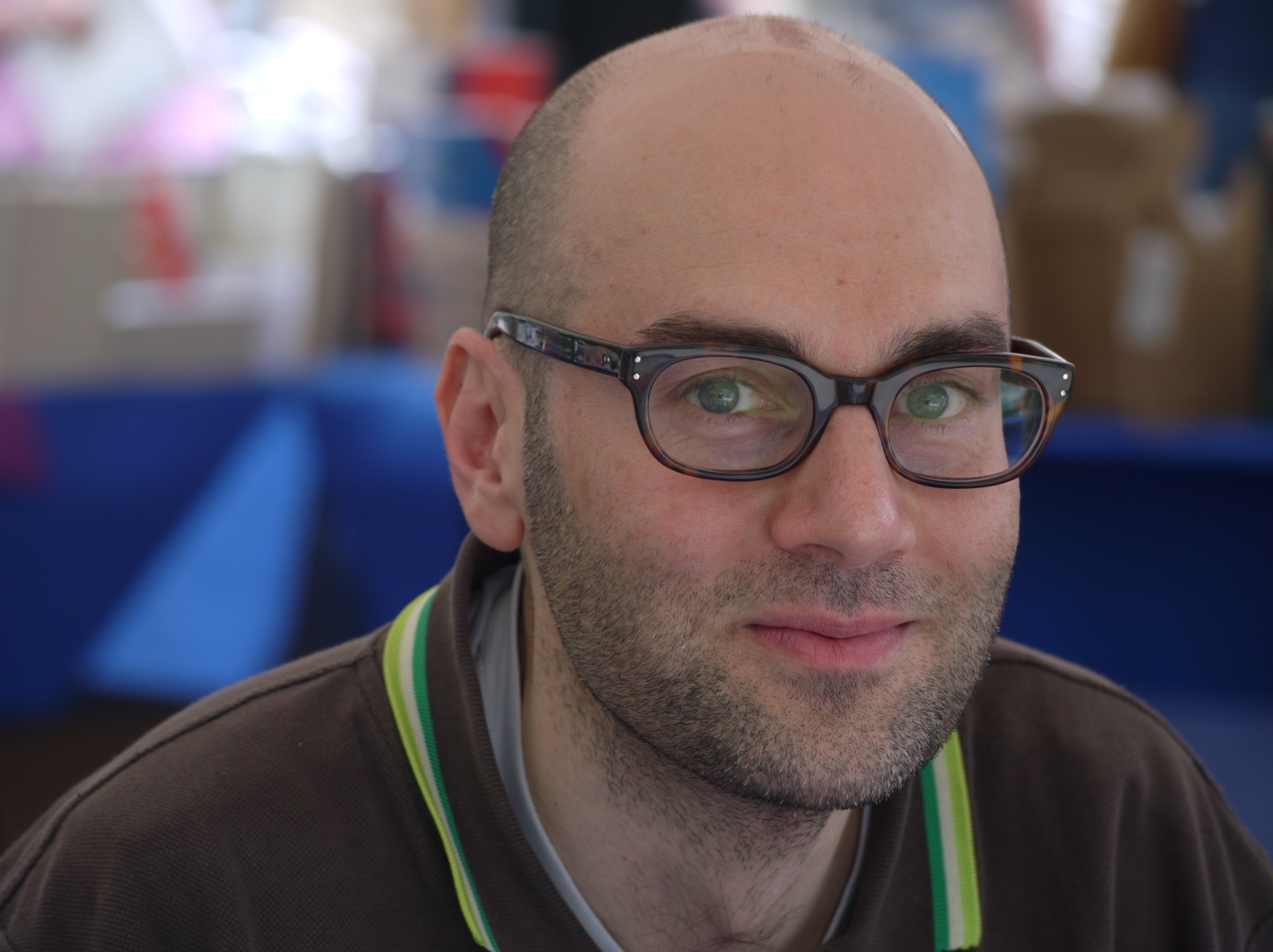
- Education: Columbia University (MS); London School of Economics (MSc)
- Occupation: Novelist
- Writing career
- Period: 2002–present
- Genre: Literary fiction
- Notable works: Das Kapital, The Cyclist, The Structure is Rotten, Comrade

Viken Berberian is a writer and essayist whose works rely on satire and defy easy categorization. Berberian's fiction and essays have appeared in print and online in The New York Times, le Monde Diplomatique, Foreign Affairs, Financial Times, Granta, BOMB, The Nation, and the New York Review of Books. His work has been translated into French, Italian, German, Dutch, Armenian, Hebrew, Ukrainian and Spanish (forthcoming). They are marked by keen wit and a sense of economic and political injustice.

== Biography ==
Berberian was raised in an Armenian-speaking household in Beirut. The family moved to Los Angeles at the outbreak of the Lebanese civil war, and this experience helped shape his first novel, The Cyclist. His second novel, Das Kapital, which he has described as falling somewhere between Groucho Marx and Karl Marx, was influenced by his work in the financial industry. He has graduate degrees from Columbia University and the London School of Economics (LSE).

== Awards and honors ==
Berberian's first novel, The Cyclist, was a Barnes & Noble Discover Great New Writers Selection. He has received recognition from Villa Albertine (2024),Centre national du livre (CNL) in France (2009), the William Saroyan award for international writing at Stanford University (short-list, 2003), the Conseil des arts et des lettres du Québec (2015), and the Canada Council for the Arts (2018).

== Critical recognition ==
The Cyclist was published six months after 9/11 and was widely reviewed. It deals with the thoughts of a nameless suicide bomber on a mission to use a bicycle race in Lebanon as a ruse for an insidious, international bombing conspiracy. The protagonist, the eponymous "cyclist," shares with readers his obsession with food. In the Boston Globe, Liza Weisstuch described the book as a "stunning debut ... Throughout, Berberian heaps on profound and frequently witty insight into often unexplored territory ... It's a tantalizing trip for the senses that also challenges the sensibilities."

On January 1, 2002, Kirkus Reviews wrote: "First-novelist Berberian, a New Yorker, has somehow—the somehow is actually highly skilled writing—managed to create a believable world in the mind of a young man about to end the lives of hundreds of innocents in what can no longer be called an unbelievable act...Deeply creepy, funny and perfectly timed." The novel sparked controversy for its genre and subject matter. In its 2002 Year in Ideas issue, Daniel Zalewski of the New York Times Magazine grouped Berberian, Zadie Smith, Jeffrey Eugenides, Jonathan Franzen and David Foster Wallace under the "hysterical realism" banner. Commenting on Berberian's style, Colin Walters wrote in the Washington Times that "despite its comparative brevity, The Cyclist is not a quick read, if only because the narrative doubles back on itself so much as it does, somewhat in the manner of the French nouveau roman a half-century ago...This is an odd little book, different." The Believer magazine described him as a "risk-taker who allows his imagination free rein." In its autumn 2002 issue, the Virginia Quarterly Review commented: "Very few authors have attempted a narrative portrayal concerning the relationship of a terrorist to the act of terror he feels compelled to commit. In his first novel, Viken Berberian masterfully tackles this notion."

"Das Kapital: a novel of love & money markets" was published by Editions Gallmeister (France, 2009) and Simon & Schuster (United States, 2007), more than a year before the subprime crisis. It tells the story of a trader trying to profit from market declines. The San Francisco Chronicle wrote: "No, this isn't a new translation of Marx's obtuse and history altering tome, but a slim, impeccably cool new novel ... Berberian juxtaposes the cold, profit-driven trading environment of Wall Street, with the lush antiquated calm of Marseille, France." Das Kapital emblematizes the existential soul of the investment industry in the new millennium. Its protagonist, Wayne, is an unscrupulous, legendary short seller. Berberian's real zest is for viciously satirizing the demigods of Wall Street with self-conscious language that is by turns lyrical and lacerating. Das Kapital is, as the title would suggest, both an homage and a ruthlessly funny take-down of Karl Marx's exhaustive, unfinished analysis of the capitalist system. It "captures financial lingo with hilarious panache."

In her 2013 essay, "Writing Energy Security after 9/11: Oil, Narrative, and Globalization," Georgiana Banita of Universität Bamberg noted: "The juxtaposition of finance jargon and poetic language was pioneered by Viken Berberian's Das Kapital: a novel of love and money markets, which is doubly impressive in its ability to predict the financial crisis (the book appeared in 2007) and its insight, deeper than Wayne's, into why Karl Marx's Das Kapital is especially useful as a shorthand for the entwinement of finance, social relations, and globalization in the twilight of the American empire."

In June 2014, Stipe Grgas, Chair of the American Studies Program, University of Zagreb, noted: "If people in American Studies had paid more heed to writers such as Don DeLillo, they would have had to take cognizance of the fact that DeLillo chose to title the last section of his novel Underworld (1998) Das Kapital. ... Viken Berberian's later novel, Das Kapital, only substantiates the claim that writers have been more perceptive of what was happening in the United States than those for whom the polity is the object of professional work."

In May 2019, Berberian and French illustrator Yann Kebbi published a graphic novel, "The Structure is Rotten, Comrade," by Fantagraphics Books. A French edition appeared in 2017 by Editions Actes Sud under the title, "La Structure est Pourrie, Camarade." The original manuscript was written in English by Berberian. Set in Moscow, Yerevan and Paris, it describes the story of an architect bent on destroying the collective memory of a city. The satirical book received praise in Le Monde by Mathias Enard as "more than a parody of conquering architecture... full of hilarious jabs." The Washington Post noted that the book, an honorable mention, was among "the best graphic novels, memoirs and story collections of 2019...that combine uncommon originality, plotting, and artwork." Edition Moderne published a German edition in 2020.
