= Kate Storey =

British developmental biologist

- Education: University of Sussex; University of Cambridge
- Scientific career
- Fields: neural development
- Workplaces: University of Dundee
- Doctoral advisor: Mike Bate

Kate Gillian Storey is a developmental biologist and head of the Division of Cell and Developmental Biology at the University of Dundee.

== Research and career ==
Storey investigates cellular and molecular mechanisms that regulate neural development. Her early work uncovered a fundamental cell signalling switch that controls when and where neural differentiation begins in the embryo.

More recent findings link a component of this, fibroblast growth factor signalling, to molecular machinery that regulates accessibility of neural genes for transcription.

Storey and collaborator Jason Swedlow have also introduced live imaging techniques for monitoring cell behaviour and signalling within developing tissues. These approaches led to the discovery of a new form of cell sub-division, named apical abscission, which mediates the differentiation of new born neurons

Storey undertook post-doctoral research supported by a Harkness Fellowship with professor David Weisblat, at University of California, Berkeley 1987–88 and worked with Claudio Daniel Stern FRS at the University of Oxford 1990–1994. She established her independent researcher career as fellow of Christ Church, Oxford University of Oxford 1994, moving to the School of Life Sciences, University of Dundee in 2000, where she has been Chair of Neural Development (2007) and Head of the Division of Cell & Developmental Biology since 2010.

Storey was elected a member of Royal Society of Edinburgh in 2012, the Lister Institute for Preventative Medicine in 2014, European Molecular Biology Organization in 2016 and Academy of Medical Sciences in 2017. She was awarded the MRC Suffrage Science Heirloom Award in 2014 and a Royal Society Wolfson Research Merit Award in 2015. In 2019, she was award The Waddington Medal by the British Society for Developmental Biology, awarded for major contributions to developmental biology in the United Kingdom. Her research has been funded by the Wellcome Trust, Medical Research Council, Biotechnology and Biological Sciences Research Council, The Anatomical Society and the charity Wings for Life. She was elected a Fellow of the Royal Society in May 2022.

== Art ==
Storey has worked on collaborative science-art projects, including with her sister Helen Storey. Their most notable work, Primitive Streak, was funded by one of the first Wellcome Trust Sci-Art awards in 1997. Named after the structure that organises formation of the tissue layers in the early embryo, this exhibition conveys the first 1000 hours of human embryonic development in a series of dresses and textiles.
