= Girlosophy =

Series of self-help/spirituality books

- Cover of Girlosophy: A Soul Survival Kit
- Girlosophy: A Soul Survival Kit; Girlosophy 2: The Love Survival Kit; Girlosophy: The Oracle; Girlosophy: The Breakup Survival Kit; Girlosophy: Real Girls' Stories; Girlosophy: Real Girls Eat; My Girlosophy; The Girlo Travel Survival Kit
- Author: Anthea Paul
- Language: English
- Genre: self-help, spirituality
- Publisher: Allen and Unwin
- Published: October 2002 – January 2008

Girlosophy is a series of self-help/spirituality books written by Anthea Paul. Started in 2000 with Girlosophy: A Soul Survival Kit, there are currently eight published Girlosophy books. The books are directed at young women. They emphasize being true to oneself and individual using big sister advice and fun and modern visuals from around the world with no photo manipulation.

== Series ==
The series cover a variety of issues relating to all young women.

=== Girlosophy: A Soul Survival Kit ===
Published in October 2002 by Allen and Unwin

The first book of the Girlosophy series. It introduces Girlosophy as a new way of thinking about life which captures the spirit of being a woman in the twenty-first century.

Awards

Highly Commended in The Colour Symphony Best Designed Illustrated Book category of the 2000 APA Design Awards.

=== Girlosophy 2: The Love Survival Kit ===
Published in November 2001 by Allen and Unwin

Awards

Shortlisted: The Colour Symphony Best Designed Illustrated Book APA Design Awards 2002.

This text examines the role of love and romantic relationships in life.

=== Girlosophy: The Oracle ===
Published in October 2002 by Allen and Unwin

=== Girlosophy: The Breakup Survival Kit ===
Published in November 2004 by Allen and Unwin

=== Girlosophy: Real Girls' Stories ===
Published in November 2005 by Allen and Unwin

=== Girlosophy: Real Girls Eat ===
Published in November 2005 by Allen and Unwin. Girlosophy: Real Girls Eat is an inspirational cookbook. The book makes stresses that it is not a traditional diet book because it does not focus on eating to lose weight. Instead it focuses on eating healthily. The book is separated into three parts. The first part is an informational section providing facts and guidance on how to choose foods that are not only good for the body but also the environment. The next two sections provide the recipe cookbook. The first section of recipes is contributions from real young women from various areas of the globe. The second recipe section and third and final part of the book is a compilation of recipes provided by Paul's sister, Kate Paul, a professional celebrity chef.

Awards

In 2006, Girlosophy: Real Girls Eat was the winner of the 2006 the Furi Knives Award for Excellence and in the Soft-cover Food-related Book categories in the Vittoria Australian Food Media Awards

=== My Girlosophy ===
Published in November 2006 by Allen and Unwin

=== The Girlo Travel Survival Kit ===
Published in January 2008 by Allen and Unwin

== Author ==
Anthea Paul is from Sydney Australia. She has worked as a photographer and writer for women's surfing magazines, and has also made contributions to various other international magazines. Other international work Paul has been involved in includes being an art director in the publishing, fashion, and design industries doing photo styling and editing, and trend forecasting. Some of the negative characteristics of this work, such as frequent contact with eating disorders, and airbrushing of unrealistic ideal photographs of women inspired Paul in her Girlosophy technique of portraying real, natural unaltered women.
