= Sender Unknown =

2002 novel by Sallie Lowenstein

- First edition
- Author: Sallie Lowenstein
- Language: English
- Genre: Science fiction
- Publisher: Lion Stone Publishing
- Publication date: October 2002
- Publication place: United States
- Media type: Print (paperback)
- Pages: 258
- ISBN: 0-9658486-4-7
- OCLC: 52210229
- Dewey Decimal: 813/.54 22
- LC Class: PS3562.O8935 S46 2003

Sender Unknown is a science fiction novel for young adults by Sallie Lowenstein. It was first published as a hardback by Lion Stone Books in 2002, and later published as a paperback by Scholastic Inc. in 2006.

== Plot introduction ==
Sender Unknown is about a young businessman named Mark, who orders toys from a catalog to give to children of employees of the company he works for. What is delivered is not what Mark expected, and he has to deal with it until he can finally return it.

== Setting ==
Sender Unknown is set far in the future, when technology has progressed greatly. People no longer read books or magazines made of paper; only virtual books. For entertainment, children play computer games, and reading books is unheard of. No children play with toys, or anything that you can feel for that matter. Belief in anything illogical (such as magic) is also gone from the world. Talking to other people about anything mystical is considered rude, and even holidays have been banned from the world.

There is also a distinct lack of crime in the world. This is also because technology has evolved so far that nobody is able to commit any crimes.

Nonetheless, the world of Sender Unknown is vaguely similar to the world we live in today. People drive in cars, spend their days similarly, and do not have as many automated things as might be expected for the future.

== Summary ==
Mark, a young man, has just moved into a grand new house in a new neighborhood so that he can hold a company party at his house. He doesn't like his new house and would prefer living in his small cottage on the outskirts of town, but has no choice. While moving in, Mark discovers that hard copies of magazines are delivered to his house every day except Sunday. Perhaps what is the most curious of the magazines is that they are filled with things that most people wouldn't buy: Toys. For a while, Mark simply ignores the magazines, keeping piles of them in his house. Finally, he decides to order something from them, just to see what happens. He orders ten action figures to give to the children of employees at Cannady and Company

In the meantime, Mark is getting ready for a company party that is to be held at his house. His assistant Elliot follows him around trying to convince him that his boss, Mr. Cannady won't be pleased if the company party is held in a house with no furniture. Mark's constant teasing of Elliot during their preparation for the party about how he is never relaxed is one of the book's many sources of humor.

One day when Mark gets home from work, he discovers four huge crates on his front porch. He has no idea where they could have possibly come from, after all, he has only ordered small action figures so far. He opens the crates and discovers the first four children, along with a note saying that three more toys are on their way, one is back ordered, and one is recuperating. Desperately, Mark tried to find a way to return the children, but his efforts are futile.

Unable to figure out what to do with the children, Mark goes to his sister Kate to ask her for advice. Of course he can't tell her that he ordered the children from a catalog, so he tells her that he is foster parenting them. She is flabbergasted at the idea that Mark would take in children when he is so busy with his new job, but agrees to watch them for a while. Unfortunately for Mark, a while turns out to be only one night. Luckily, he is able to find a new babysitter for the kids: Lady A (Lady Anderson), who owns a quirky store Mark orders from often. Lady A also believes that Mark is the children's foster parent. Lady A also brings a problem for Mark though: she reminds him that the children need to be enrolled in school. For the time being, Mark decides to keep the kids, but he doesn't know exactly what he is going to do yet.

One day, when riding in a taxicab to the book store, Mark meets an ex-cop named Pete. Pete and Mark talk for a while, and Mark learns that Pete knows someone who worked in DNA registration. Mark has a revelation and realizes that Pete could hold all of the answers to the questions he has. Mark offers Pete a job: to help him register the children's DNA and get them official identification until he can figure out how to return the children. He also asks Pete to help him track the magazines. Pete accepts. Mark is feeling great right until he gets home that day and sees two more huge boxes on the front porch, and finds two more children.

The next day, Pete arrives at Mark's house to collect DNA from the (now seven) children. Pete tells Mark that because he had to quit his job as taxi driver, he and his granddaughter need a place to stay while he works on the project. Mark warmly welcomes Pete into his house.

Pete has the DNA checks done, and discovers that all of the children's DNA is synthetic. He then tells Mark about the website where ID records are stored, and that Mark has to figure out a way into the records. It takes Mark about 20 minutes to hack into the records. Once he is done, Pete calls a friend who knows how to access the proper virtual-forms that are required for registering DNA. When Pete's associate has pulled up the necessary forms for Mark, he fills them in and submits them. Much to Mark's dismay, Pete has had no luck tracking down the company that is sending the magazines. When things start to look a little more promising for Mark, he receives a large crate in the mail, with BACK ORDERED stamped across the front. Out of this crate comes yet another child.

A few days later, Mark is at a party with Lady A when the last box comes in the mail. Inside this box is Castor, the cyborg. When Mark sees that Castor cannot be in any way from this planet, he begins to think about genetic engineering as a possibility for the appearance of all the children. He uses company funds to pay for viewing rights of secure documents regarding genetic engineering that have absolutely no relation to his current project at work, and discovers that genetic engineering is not only common, but the fine for it is measly, and not likely to stop anybody from doing any of their experiments.

The night of the party at Mark's house finally arrives. It is the time for all of Elliot's nagging to pay off. Other than the caterers leaving in the middle of the party because of an impending snow storm, all goes well. Mr. Cannady and the rest of the guests really enjoy the party. Then the snowstorm hits, causing the power to go out, and everyone's cars get snowed in. Luckily, Mark is able to entertain most of the guests.

When most people can't stand to wait at the house any longer, the children show their true abilities. Sam flies to peoples' houses to check on their children, Rollo magically fixes the furnace, and Castor starts heating up (and starting) peoples' cars. But the one act that transforms most of the people in the party from non-believers in fairy tales to believers is when Mark is hit by a falling tree, and Sam lifts the entire tree off of him. Although normally most people would consider this a trick of the eyes, those at the party have seen so much that they cannot possibly deny that something unnatural is going on, despite what society may tell them.

Mark realizes that he has brought belief in fairy tales back to people in the world who had only believed in logic before. He felt so connected to the children that he finally decided for sure that he was going to keep the children just as they were. If possible, he might even try to find more people with catalog children like him, and share his information. Finally, as Mark was going through a box owned by his father in his attic, he discovered a little tag. On the tag, it said "Unknown experiment." In his father's handwriting is "My son". Mark throws away the tag and it is hinted as he was going to ask Lady A to marry him.

== Characters ==
=== Humans ===
Mark

(Markham) - The youngest employee of the firm Cannady and Company. Mark graduated from high school at the age of 14, but instead of going on to become rich and successful, settled down, and worked as an inventor. When Mark's 10 year class reunion came up, he was ridiculed by many of his friends who thought he would become famous, but saw he lived a very small, unrecognized life. This is when Mark decided to become successful, and prove all his classmates wrong. In 6 months he had a very high position in the company Cannady and Company, and was indispensable. He is the caretaker and father figure for the children.

Ashley Anderson

(Lady A) - Mark's friend. Mark enjoys going to Lady A's furniture store and shopping for old, often dilapidated furniture that he can repair. Mark and Lady A (Or as she tells him later, Ashley) have a complicated romantic relationship. Mark is eager to be her boyfriend, but Lady A is hesitant and skeptic about romance. At the end of the book, Mark says something that hints he was going to ask Lady A to marry him.

Pete

Mark's accomplice in the plans to get papers for the "children." Mark meets Pete in a taxicab, and Mark offers Pete a job after learning about his experience with criminals and computers. When Pete accepts, he moves into Mark's house with his granddaughter Fiona.

Kate

Mark's sister. Kate is constantly making negative remarks to Mark, but still helps him in times of need.

Elliot

Mark's assistant, appointed by Mr. Cannady. Mark would rather not have an assistant, but Elliot is needed to ensure that Mark gets the party off without a hitch. Throughout the book, Mark teases Elliot about how he never relaxes enough.

Mr. Cannady

Mark's boss. Mr. Cannady is interested in making money and creating a video game that will catch young and old peoples attention and be a great money making machine.

=== Experiments ===
The experiments are biologically engineered children that are designed to be like fairy tale characters. They are bought through the snail-mail catalogs that are sent to marks house. The experiments are preserved in cold liquid until someone orders them from a catalog.

Mark

Mark was an experiment but did not discover it until the end of the book. Unlike the rest of the experiments, he has no ties to fairy tale characters.

Elflet

An elf who loves to "repair" shoes. Elflet is actually better at destroying shoes, and needs lessons on repairing them. However, he shows near the end of the book he is gifted at making shoes out of raw materials.

Paul

Paul is the young Paul Bunyan. He is shipped with an ax, and a stuffed blue ox. He is very strong for his age.

Jack

A generic storybook Jack. The children and Mark often speculate over what tale he is from, sometimes reading through a book of nursery rhymes. It never clearly states which Jack he is.

Traxon

A green extraterrestrial who is shipped with an invisibility screen, and is allergic to refined sugar. Traxon creates trouble when he puts on his invisibility screen, goes over to a neighbor's house and tries to scare her. It is said that he will grow to be over 7 feet tall, and needs a high protein diet.

Rollo

Future Wizard of the Lost Land. Rollo cannot perform much magic, and is very disappointed when he learns (by reading The Wizard of the Lost Land) that he will grow up to become a fake. He is very smart and can create and invent a spectrum of things.

Ailithe

A wind child from another world. She can create terrible wind storms when she is angry.

Mirabella

A mind reader from the Lost City of Atlantis. Of all the children, Mirabella probably has the largest role in the story, because of her mind reading. She is constantly telling Mark how people feel, and letting him know about any future trouble.

Fiona

Pete's granddaughter. At first she is introduced as an albino, having no skin, eye, or hair color except the slightly opaque appearance of a ghost. She can also fit into very small places. It is later revealed she is an experiment. It is assumed she was ordered as a ghost.

Castor

A cyborg who has doubts about his human side. Eventually everyone convinces him that even though he does not have insides like humans, he is just like them in most ways.

Sam

A strong boy who will grow into a super hero. He is able to fly and always has his pet dog with him. He plays an important role at the end of the book when a tragedy occurs. He came with a dog, Speedy.

== Publishing details ==
- 2002, USA, Lion Stone Books (ISBN 978-0-9658486-4-0), pub date ? October 2002, paperback (1st edition)
- 2006, USA, Scholastic Publishing (ISBN 0-439-85704-X), pub date 1 January 2006, paperback
