= Elizabeth Arnold (poet) =

American poet (1958–2024)

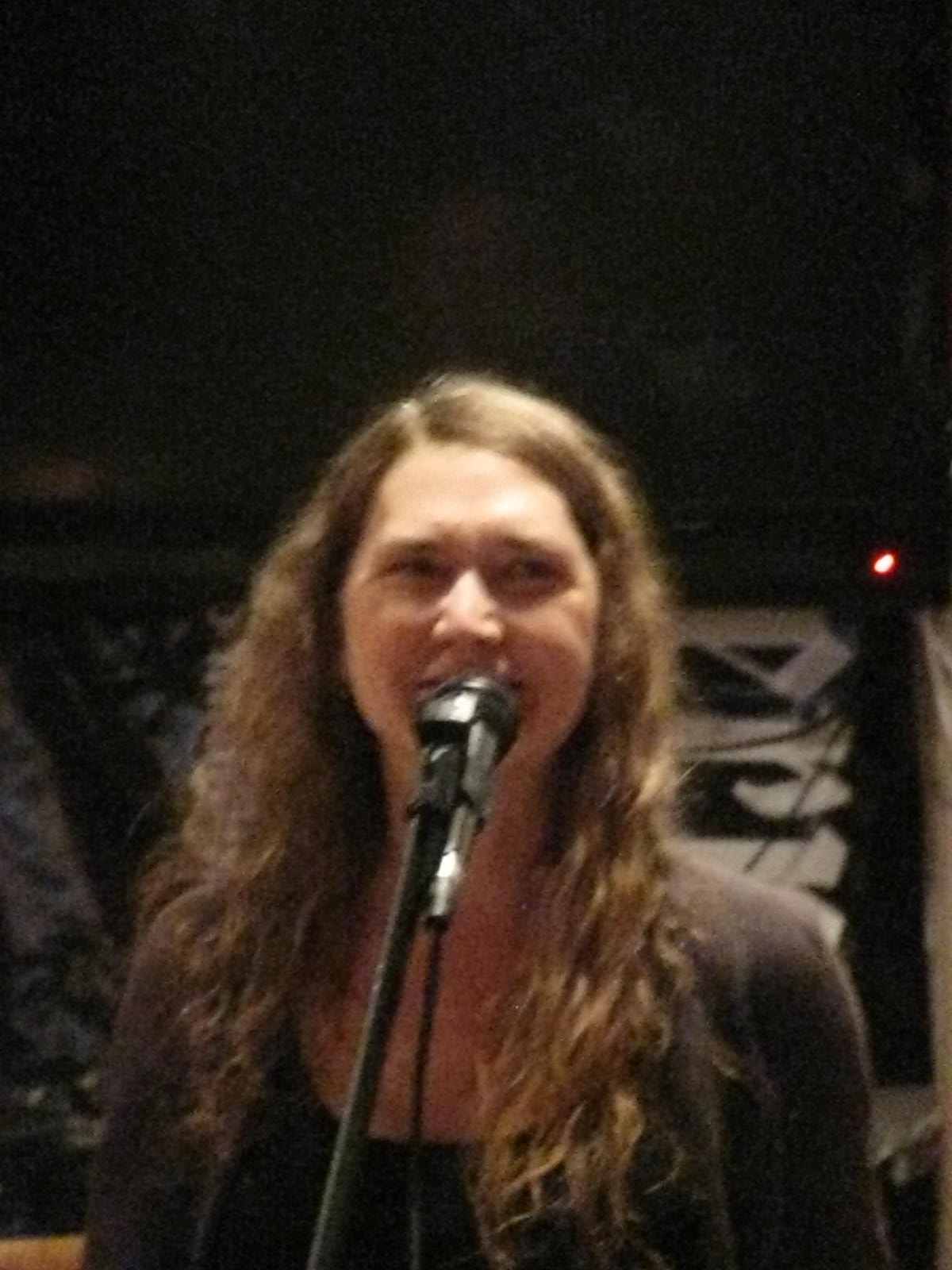
- Born: 1958
- Died: February 24, 2024 (aged 65–66)
- Education: PhD from the University of Chicago
- Occupations: Poet, University of Maryland professor
- Writing career
- Language: English
- Notable awards: 2003 and 2006 Pushcart Prize Nominee in Poetry; 2002 Whiting Award; 2002 Robert Frost Fellowship and Scholarship (1997), Bread Loaf Writers Conference; 1997–1998 Lannan Fellowship in poetry at the Fine Arts Work Center in Provincetown; 1995 Yaddo Fellowship

Elizabeth Arnold (1958 – February 24, 2024) was an American poet.

== Life and career ==
Arnold graduated from University of Chicago, with a PhD. She taught at the University of Maryland.

Her work has appeared in Poetry, Slate, TriQuarterly, Conjunctions, Antioch Review, Chicago Review, Sagetrieb, Literary Imagination, Gulf Coast, The Carolina Review, Tikkun, Pequod, Smartish Pace, Poetry Daily, Kalliope, and Shankpain.

According to her publisher, Flood Editions, Arnold died after a long illness on February 24, 2024.

== Awards ==
- 2003 and 2006 Pushcart Prize Nominee in Poetry
- 2002 Whiting Award
- 2002 Robert Frost Fellowship and Scholarship (1997), Bread Loaf Writers Conference
- 1997–1998 Lannan Fellowship in poetry at the Fine Arts Work Center in Provincetown
- 1995 Yaddo Fellowship

== Works ==
- "Iraqi Boy". Poetry. September 2008.
- "The South"; "Seepage", Slate, July 11, 2001
- "Epic Simile", Slate, October 7, 2003
- "The Horseman". Kalliope, 1999.

Books

- Through woods: a collection of poems. Warren Wilson College. 1996.
- The Reef. University of Chicago Press. 1999. ISBN 9780226027371.
- Civilization. Flood Editions. 2006. ISBN 9780978746704.
- Effacement. Flood Editions. 2010. ISBN 9780981952024.
- Life. Flood Editions. 2014. ISBN 9780983889380.
- Skeleton Coast. Flood Editions. 2017. ISBN 9780990340799.

Songs

- Whistling Acacia 2020, music Phil Fried https://soundcloud.com/phil-fried/whistling-acacia?si=b533e4d21d56438ea40fbae099e98b8b&utm_source=clipboard&utm_medium=text&utm_campaign=social_sharing
