= The Sigma Protocol =

Novel by Robert Ludlum

- The Sigma Protocol first edition cover.
- Author: Robert Ludlum
- Language: English
- Genre: Thriller
- Publisher: St. Martin's Press
- Publication date: October 30, 2001
- Publication place: United States
- Media type: Print (Hardcover, Paperback) & Audiobook
- Pages: 528 pp (first edition)
- ISBN: 0-312-27688-5
- OCLC: 47746174
- Dewey Decimal: 813/.54 21
- LC Class: PS3562.U26 S54 2001

The Sigma Protocol is the last novel written completely by Robert Ludlum, and was published posthumously. It is the story of the son of a Holocaust survivor who gets entangled in an international conspiracy by industrialists and financiers to take advantage of wartime technology.

== Plot ==
Ben Hartman is vacationing in Switzerland when he meets his old school buddy Jimmy Cavanaugh - who tries to kill him. As he dodges assassins, mysterious tails, and police while searching for a safe place to hide, he finds his twin brother, Peter, who was thought to have died in an airplane crash several years earlier. Peter describes an international corporation which was formed in the last days of World War II, composed of financiers, influential members of large corporations, and Nazi brass. He gives Ben a photo of some of the leaders, only to find out that their father was a member. Soon, Peter is killed by an assassin, and Ben escapes with his life again. He later meets up with Liesel (Peter's girlfriend).

Meanwhile, United States Department of Justice Agent Anna Navarro is recruited by a secretive group within the DoJ to investigate the deaths of a list of influential men around the world who have been dying mysteriously. Her probes turn up false leads, possible coverups, and dead ends, until she finds out that the men have been poisoned by someone using the same obscure toxin. Following the leads, she finds that the men she had been assigned to investigate are part of an international group of financiers and business moguls. She soon finds out that she has been reported "off the reservation", and the attempts begin on her life as well.

Through their own distinct investigative means, the two protagonists discover more about the shadowy group, which is called Sigma. It is learned that Sigma has grown from a simple attempt to plunder the Nazi treasury and stabilize the industrial and financial state of the world in the wake of the war, to a political and financial machine which controls as many as 75% of the world's leading companies, and has enough covert political clout to directly influence the outcome of the likes of Presidential elections. Sigma also helped some of the Nazi war criminals, including Nazi doctor Gerhard Lenz, evade capture.

Protagonists Hartman and Navarro eventually meet and form an alliance, since both are being hunted by Sigma assassins. Through their concerted efforts, they discover that Sigma is experiencing an internal struggle. The founders, who are dead or dying, believe that Sigma should disband, as it had played its role in the world; they're called the angeli rebelli, and are being hunted by the new Sigma leadership. That new leadership, an apparently philanthropic doctor named Jürgen Lenz, son of Sigma founding member Gerhard Lenz, has decided on a new direction for the group, and is determined to eliminate any internal opposition.

Navarro is kidnapped by Lenz, and Hartman tracks them to an old castle in the Austrian Alps. Successfully infiltrating the castle, he discovers Sigma's new direction: age reversal. Lenz had found a way to reverse human aging based largely on WW2 era experimentation on children with premature aging also known as Progeria, and he had been treating some of the world's elite to reverse their aging as well. Lenz was his own first successful experiment, for his real name is Gerhard Lenz - he is the Nazi doctor and a founding member of Sigma. After killing Lenz, Hartman and Navarro escape in a helicopter, while the castle is destroyed by an avalanche.

The book is based on the Bilderberg Group and the myths and mysteries surrounding it.

== Film adaptation ==
On May 16, 2016, Universal Pictures and Captivate Entertainment announced the film adaptation will be a part of a cinematic universe of Robert Ludlum adaptations such as: The Janson Directive, The Covert One series, The Parsifal Mosaic and crossover films.

== Publication history ==
- 2001, US, St. Martin's Press ISBN 0-312-27688-5, Pub date October 30, 2001, Hardback
- 2002, US, St. Martin's Paperbacks ISBN 0-312-98251-8, Pub date October 13, 2002, Paperback
- 2002, UK, Orion ISBN 0-7528-4813-5, Pub date August 1, 2002, Paperback
